= Luke Gower =

Australian musician

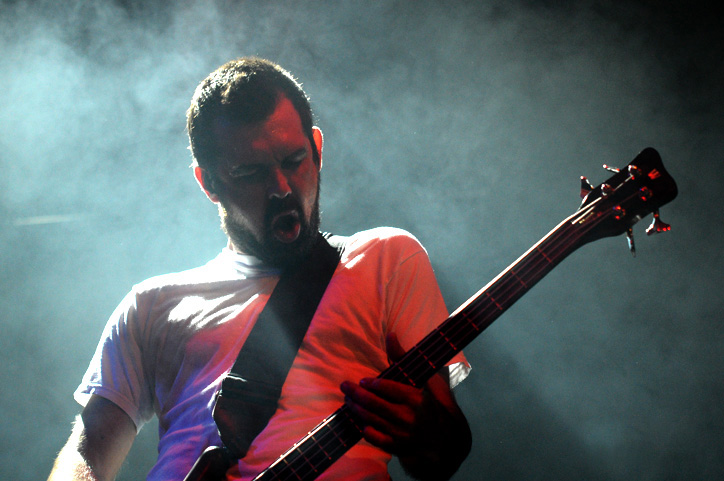
- Gower performing with Cog in Fremantle, June 2009

Background information
- Born: Luke Erin Gower; Sydney, New South Wales, Australia
- Genres: Rock; progressive rock
- Occupation: Musician
- Instruments: Bass guitar; backing vocals
- Years active: 2000–present
- Labels: Difrnt; National Recorder; Little Samurai; MGM

Luke Erin Gower is an Australian musician who is member of the progressive rock band Cog (1998–2010, 2016–present). He plays bass and sings background vocals. Gower's oldest brother, Flynn is their lead singer and guitarist. Luke and Flynn formed a band, The Occupants which issued a single, "I've Been Thinking" (April 2013) and an extended play, Hindsight (November 2014).

== Biography ==
Gower grew up in Sydney and is the youngest of three brothers; Flynn is the oldest. Gower joined his brother's progressive rock band, Cog, in 2000, initially as their live bass guitarist. He later joined as permanent bassist and played on two of their albums, The New Normal (2005) and Sharing Space (2008) and some of their extended plays including, Open Up (2003). The latter includes the band's cover version of the 1993 song by Leftfield featuring John Lydon. Cog disbanded in 2010.

On 24 April 2013 Luke and Flynn Gower released a new single, "I've Been Thinking", under a project name, the Occupants. It was recorded late 2012 at Rocking Horse Studios in Byron Bay; Forrester Savell produced the track with Troy Wright on drums. Soon after Leigh Davies joined the group, which issued a four-track EP, Hindsight, in November 2014 via Pavement Records. In February 2016 Cog reformed and undertook a reunion tour of Australia.

Luke is also an avid fisher, having previously held the title of Champion Angler at a contest in Exmouth, Western Australia.

== Equipment ==
Bass guitars

Luke Gower uses a selection of Warwick basses. Currently, he uses four on tour:

  - 4-string Thumb NT
  - 5-string Thumb NT
  - 4-string Streamer Stage 1
  - 5-string Thumb Bolt-on.

He also has 2 Custom Shop Warwick Thumb NT four strings, one in Flame Maple and one in Karelian Birch that were received after the touring of Sharing Space. His first bass guitar in Cog was a Warwick FNA 4string.

Amplifiers and effects

Gower plays Ashdown Amplifiers. Previously, he played a range of amplifiers. His rig includes an ABM 500 EVO III Head and an ABM500 EVO II Head, with another ABM500 EVOII as a spare. He uses two ABM810 Cabinets. He also uses a range of different effects including:

  - Boss DD-20 Giga Delay (x2)
  - Boss EQ-20 Graphic Equalizer
  - Boss CE-5 Chorus Ensembble
  - Little Lehle II Loop Switch (x2)
  - Electro-Harmonix Sovtek Big Muff
  - Dunlop Bass Wah
  - Guyatone BB-X Flip Valve Bass Driver

== Discography ==
=== Albums ===
- The New Normal (Difrnt Music/MGM Distribution, 2005) AUS#19
- Sharing Space (Difrnt Music/MGM Distribution, 2008) AUS#2
- Just Visiting (Destra Corporation, 2008)

=== Singles and extended plays ===
- Pseudo (2000)
- Just Visiting Part One (Little Samurai/MGM Distribution, 2002)
- Just Visiting Part Two (Little Samurai/MGM Distribution, 2002)
- Open Up (Little Samurai/MGM Distribution, 2003)
- "Run" (Different Music/MGM Distribution, 2005)
- "Resonate"
- "Real Life"
- "What If" (2007) AUS#45
- "Bird of Feather" (2008)

=== Videography ===
- "Paris, Texas" (2002)
- "Open Up" (2003)
- "My Enemy" (2005)
- "Run" (2005)
- "What If" (2007)
- "Bird of Feather" (2008)
- "Are You Interested?" (2008)
