= Lucius Borich =

Australian musician (born 1971)

- Born: 1971 (age 54–55); Sydney, New South Wales, Australia
- Genres: Progressive rock, alternative rock, hard rock, rock, experimental jazz
- Occupations: Musician, songwriter, producer
- Instruments: Drums, percussion, guitar, bass, vocals
- Years active: 1995–present
- Label: MGM Distribution
- Website: cog.com.au =

Lucius Borich (born 1971) is an Australian musician, best known as the drummer for the band Cog, and previously the drummer in funk metal band Juice and in The Hanging Tree as well as Floating Me. He currently plays as a member of The Nerve.

== Biography ==
Lucius has been playing music since the age of 3. He was given his first drum kit by two of Australia's best known drummers from the 70's, Keith Barber and Johnny Dick. Lucius's father's band at the time was The Party Boys, with guest stars Doane Perry (Jethro Tull) and Richard Clapton, who invited young Lucius to play with them.

At age 14, Lucius was given the opportunity to perform and tour around Australia with the Kevin Borich Express for a year. Shortly after, he left school and decided to pursue drumming full-time. He was then called upon by ex members Mark Evans (AC/DC) and Mick Cocks (Rose Tattoo), to join a Rolling Stones cover band, the Rolling Clones. They toured for a year and a half throughout Australia and New Zealand, and for the next three years, Lucius continued to play with other bands. This experience gave Lucius a reputation as one of Australia's finest and flexible up and coming drummers.

In 1998, he formed Cog with high school friend Flynn Gower. Later, Flynn's brother joined the band on bass, Luke Gower. Lucius has played on 2 albums for Cog, The New Normal (2005) and Sharing Space (2008). He has also released a number of singles and EPs with the band including Just Visiting Part One (2002) and Just Visiting Part Two (2002).

Lucius is the son of Australian guitarist and singer-songwriter Kevin Borich, and has played on many of his albums, playing both bass and drums. Kevin is one of New Zealand and Australia's most respected blues/rock guitarists. His encouragement and involvement in the industry gave Lucius his first experiences. Kevin and Lucius appeared together in an episode of the comedy-drama TV series Willing and Abel, in which Lucius played the regular role of street kid Parramatta Jones. Lucius, also took part in a very special tour in July 2009. Lucius joined forces with his father, the great Kevin Borich to perform on the Borich x Borich Tour with Harry Brus on bass.

In April 2008, Lucius was featured in Australian drum magazine DRUMscene as the feature cover story. Later, he was invited to play on the DRUMscene Live Tour. He performed in cities including Adelaide, Brisbane, Canberra, Sydney, Melbourne and Perth.

In early 2009, he appeared in the Channel 9, Twenty20 Cricket opening segment, playing the drums alongside DJ Mark Dynamik, and with Cog's logo on the front of the bass drum.

More recently, he has been working recording touring with Magnus and recording, releasing music with Juice, their latest release 2017 titled Signs. He runs the recording, production, and mixing studio, Studio101, in Byron Bay.

In 2015, after a 5-year hiatus, Borich started recording and touring again in sold out shows across Australia with Cog.

== Personal life ==
Borich has three sons; Zappa, Kyuss and the late Buddy.

== Equipment ==
- DW Collector's Series Drums & Zildjian Cymbals:
- Drums – Natural Eco-X Project Bamboo/Birch Shells
  - 10x8" Tom
  - 12x9" Tom
  - 16x16" Floor Tom
  - 18x16" Floor Tom
  - 24x16" Bass Drum
  - 14x6.5" DW Bronze Snare
  - 12" Remo Roto-Tom
- Cymbals – Zildjian
  - 14" Dark K Hi-Hats
  - 22" Dark K Power Ride
  - 20" K Dark Crash
  - 19" K Dark Crash
  - 18" K Dark Crash
  - 17" K Dark Crash
  - 20" Oriental China
  - 10" A Custom Splash
  - 8" A Custom Splash
  - 8" Ice Bell
  - 22" Oriental Wind Gong
- Electronics – Roland
  - 4x PD-8 Trigger Dual Pads
  - SPD-S Sampling Pad
  - FD-8 Hi-Hat Control Pedal
- Lucius also used OTIS, DW 9000 Series Hardware, Zildjian, Schecter Guitars Evans drum skins, JetCity Amplification, Vic Firth 5B Sticks, PreSonus & RODE MICROPHONES.

== Discography ==
=== Albums ===
- Juice Album Signs (2017)
- Floating Me Self Titled (2011)
- Cog Sharing Space (Difrnt Music/MGM Distribution, 2008) AUS#2
- Cog The New Normal (Difrnt Music/MGM Distribution, 2005) AUS#19
- Cog Just Visiting (Destra Corporation, 2008)
- The Hanging Tree Self Titled (1997)
- Juice Fractured (1996)
- Juice Wine Of Life (1994)

=== Singles and EPs ===
- Pseudo (2000)
- Just Visiting Part One (Little Samurai/MGM Distribution, 2002)
- Just Visiting Part Two (Little Samurai/MGM Distribution, 2002)
- Open Up (Little Samurai/MGM Distribution, 2003)
- "Run" (Different Music/MGM Distribution, 2005)
- "Resonate"
- "Real Life"
- "What If" (2007) AUS#45
- "Bird of Feather" (2008)

=== Videography ===
- "Paris, Texas" (2002)
- "Open Up" (2003)
- "My Enemy" (2005)
- "Run" (2005)
- "What If" (2007)
- "Bird of Feather" (2008)
- "Are You Interested?" (2008)
