= Just Visiting =

Just Visiting may refer to:

- Just Visiting (album series), a 2002 EP series by Cog
  - Just Visiting (Cog album), a 2008 compilation rerelease of the EPs
- Just Visiting, an American Christian rock band, some of whose members later formed the Elms, or their 1998 debut album
- Just Visiting (film), a 2001 comedy film
- "Just Visiting" (Birds of a Feather), an episode of Birds of a Feather
