= Unda K9 Records =

Australian independent record label

- Founded: 2002
- Founder: Lui
- Distributor(s): MGM Metropolitan Groove Merchants (In Australia)
- Genre: hip hop
- Country of origin: Australia
- Location: Crows Nest, New South Wales
- Official website: undak9.com

Unda K9 Records is an independent Australian record label founded by a female hip-hop record producer Lui. Since the formation, the label has represented a number of hip-hop acts including Figgkidd a.k.a. Lee Monro, Bishop a.k.a. Michael Sison, DJ Eko, Bukkcity a.k.a. Andre Knight, DJ Denno, DJ Funk (Melbourne), Big Dave (Distribution Only), Tycotic, 13th Son, Syntax (from Trace Elements), DirtBox Kings, Herb (from Basic Equipment) and DJ Crusador. Even though the company had seen some very positive times, it folded its recording studio, label and management division in 2009. Unda K9 Records has since re-branded dropping the "records" to only Unda K9 and concentrates on selected musical releases, artist meet and greets, publicity, touring and MMA events.

== History ==
After Lui established Unda K9 Pty Limited, in 2002 as an independent hip-hop record label, that was heavily involved in record production, management, publishing and the promotion of their artist's material, and its release on both a national and international scale. In the heyday period of Unda K9 Records (2003-2009), the label hosted a predominantly hip-hop roster and was based out of the recording studio and office in Willoughby Road, Crows Nest in New South Wales in Sydney.

The label enjoyed its strongest commercial success to date with the release of FiggKidd's album What Is FiggKidd?. In 2005, Unda K9 Records' Lui founded Park Jam Festival presented by Triple J, the first Australian hip-hop festival, at Luna Park, Sydney. The Park Jam concept was the first to bring together all types of hip hop from underground and commercial spheres, including indigenous, alternative and experimental, with headliners such as Digital Underground, Kool Keith and KutMasta Kurt. Since 2007 Unda K9 Records has been developing Australian born American raised - Melbourne residing artist Bukkcity, who since signing to the label has won three major independent music awards, before releasing his official debut mini-album Same Place in January 2009. Also calling Unda K9 Records home is a diverse collective of artists and DJ’s including young Central Coast rapper Tycotic and his label Asylum 57, Sydney local artist 13th Son, Herb (from Sydney collective Basic Equipment), DirtBox Kings (a collective of well known underground emcee’s and DJ’s from Sydney), Benji from Sydney crew PK Crew and DJ Jay Funk.

As of 2008, FiggKidd and Unda K9 Records officially parted ways on mutual terms and still remain good friends.

Unda K9 Records through MGM distribution also acts as a third party distributor.

Other artists formerly signed to Unda K9 include A Broken Silence and The Vangarde. Both acts left Unda K9 without releasing a commercial album.

== Artists ==
Unda K9 former artist roster:

- Figgkidd (Sydney)
- Bukkcity (Melbourne)
- Big Dave (Distribution only) (Canberra)
- Tycotic (New South Wales)
- 13th Son (New South Wales)
- DirtBox Kings (New South Wales)
- Herb (of Basic Equipment) (New South Wales)
- DJ Jay Funk (Melbourne)
- Benji of PK Crew (New South Wales)
- The Vanguarde (Sydney)

== See also ==
- List of record labels
- Australian Independent Record Labels Association
