= Just Visiting (album series) =

EP series by Cog
- Released: October 1, 2002
- Recorded: instruments: 1998-1999 vocals: 2000
- Genre: Rock, progressive rock
- Length: 29:11
- Label: Little Samurai Records; MGM Distribution
- Producer: Cog

Cog chronology
Just Visiting (2002)	Open Up (2003)

Just Visiting is a two-part 2002 extended play series by Australian rock group, Cog. Besides vocals, it was recorded in the late 1990s. Guitar and drums were recorded at Stage Door Rehearsal Studio, in Alexandria, while bass guitar was recorded by drummer Lucius Borich, at his home on a TASCAM 8-track portastudio, before Luke Gower joined the band on bass guitar. These tracks served as demonstration recordings that had them booked for performance, and eventually signed to booking agent TPA, through Owen Orford. Frustrated at the lack of label interest, Orford, despite his lack of experience with record labels started his own to release the Just Visiting EPs, on Little Samurai Records.

Just Visiting Part 1 was issued on 21 January 2002 on the MGM Distribution label, which peaked at No. 14 on the ARIA Heavy Rock & Metal Singles Chart. While Just Visiting Part 2 appeared on 1 October in that year and reached No. 4 on the same component chart. On 18 August 2008 both parts of the series were released as a single album, remastered by Borich, as Just Visiting. It contained all the tracks from both EPs, with a rearranged track listing and longer versions of "Moshiach", "Bondi", and "Paris, Texas" in place of the ones released on the EP.

== Track listing ==
=== Part One ===
1. "Moshiach" - 5:33
2. "Bondi" - 3:33
3. "1010011010" - 5:55
4. "Moo" - 4:55
5. "Holes" - 4:55

=== Part Two ===
1. "Paris, Texas" - 4:18
2. "Stretch" - 5:58
3. "The Truth and Other Lies" - 5:13
4. "Pseudo" - 5:22
5. "Just Visiting" - 8:18

=== Re-release ===
1. "Bondi" - 4:59
2. "100011010" - 6:00
3. "Pseudo" - 5:18
4. "Moo" - 4:59
5. "Stretch" - 5:58
6. "The Truth and Other Lies" - 5:24
7. "Holes" - 4:56
8. "Moshiach" - 6:39
9. "Paris, Texas" - 6:16
10. "Just Visiting" - 8:19

== Personnel ==
=== Cog ===
- Flynn Gower - guitar & vocals
- Lucius Borich - drums, backings & bits
- Luke Gower - bottom end & backings

=== Players ===
- Carla Werner - vocals on "The Truth and Other Lies"
- Flynn Gower - guitar, vocals
- Lucius Borich - drums, bass guitar, samples, backing vocals
- Produced by Cog
- Recorded by Cog, except vocals, recorded by Hamish Adam
- Mixed by "Zak" and Cog
- Mastered by Marsen Murad & Michael Macken

== Charts ==
Chart (2002)	Peak position
Australian (ARIA Charts)	90
