= Flynn Gower =

Australian vocalist, composer and guitarist

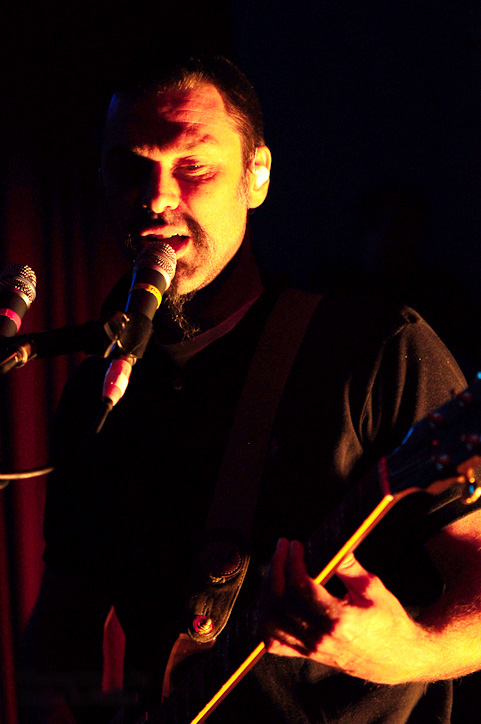
- Gower in 2009

Background information
- Genres: Progressive rock, alternative rock
- Occupations: Musician, songwriter
- Instruments: Guitar, vocals
- Years active: 1995–present
- Labels: Difrnt Music; National Recorder; Little Samurai; MGM Distribution
- Website: www.theoccupantsmusic.com cog.com.au

Flynn Gower is an Australian vocalist, composer and guitarist who is currently the frontman of The Occupants. He is best known as frontman of the rock band Cog, which disbanded in 2010. He was also a guitarist in now-defunct funk metal band The Hanging Tree.

== Biography ==
Gower initiated his career in the early- to mid-90s forming the funk metal band The Hanging Tree, which became one of the most popular bands in the Sydney live circuit. After a few years developing a following through extensive touring, the band released a debut, self-titled album in 1996.
Shortly before the recording of this album, Lucius Borich, a childhood friend of Gower joined the band on drums, after leaving ARIA Award nominated grunge band Juice. In 1997, Borich left the band and travelled to the U.S. to do session work. Throughout, however, Gower was communicating with Borich, both writing new music. This led to the formation of Cog in 1998.

Gower had, in preparation for a move to the U.S., sold all of his gear. However, Borich had returned home, unhappy with the session work he had been undertaking. For the next 8 years, Cog consumed the musical direction of Gower, though much of the music the band was playing had been written before the 1998 formation of the band. The band recorded demos in 1998, with Borich playing bass. Flynn's brother Luke Gower was brought in on bass guitar for live shows.

Initially, Cog played instrumentally, but after failing in a search for a vocalist, Gower took up the role, though without any previous experience. From 1998 to 2002, the band played through Sydney, gathering a following to rival that of The Hanging Tree in the mid 1990s. In 2002, the band came to the fore of Australia's heavy rock/metal scene with the release of the Just Visiting Part One and Just Visiting Part Two EPs. In early 2003, Gower contributed vocals to the track Perception Twin by peers The Butterfly Effect, appearing on their Begins Here album. Cog released the single Open Up in March 2003, and continued to tour Australia. In mid-2004 the band shifted management and labels, before recording a debut album in The New Normal. After its release in April 2005, the album saw a slight shift and a massive growth in the band's fanbase, in accordance with a more commercial sound, while retaining a progressive feel, some tracks topping 10 minutes. After four national tours in the space of a year, the band returned to the US began to record and write tracks for their second album, entitled Sharing Space, in Weed, California. Sharing Space was released on 12 April 2008. In February, the band announced that they will be touring around Australia in support of Sharing Space in May and June.

On 24 April 2013 Flynn and Luke Gower released a new single "I've been thinking" under a project name "The Occupants Music", recorded late 2012 at Rocking Horse Studios in Byron Bay. Forrester Savell produced the track with Troy Wright on drums.

In 2021, Gower stirred controversy after sharing posts of anti-vaccination rhetoric and conspiracies surrounding COVID-19 on social media, while also publicly voicing his support for the anti-lockdown protests in New South Wales.

== Music ==
=== Vocals ===
His vocal style is intriguing and unique, particularly in the early stages of Cog's development, alternating between a bizarre high-pitched semi-falsetto sung from the throat and more masculine timbres. His formation of words is also fairly unusual, drawing out diphthongs to extremes. Over the course of Cog's history, the semi-falsetto has been replaced with more conventional singing, but remaining is the odd word formation.

=== Guitar ===
Gower's style is fairly left field, with a lot of contrast between heavier and lighter timbres. Primary influences on his style are not very apparent upon listening, though he has cited Helmet, Tool and Soundgarden. The tuning of his guitars are all the same in the 4 lower strings. The tuning being (low to high) CGCf always for the lower strings, and the 2 highest strings vary in tuning, depending on the song, for example, "The Spine" and "Doors.." are tuned (low to high) to CGCfcd. The tunings used were all made up, writing the music first, then tuning the guitar making it easier to play what had been written. In Cog, where rhythm plays a significant part in the music, there is usually a lot of interplay between drums, bass and guitar. Of late, his style seems to be somewhat influenced by heavier post-rock bands such as Isis and Pelican.

=== Equipment ===
Guitars:
Gower uses a selection of guitars made by Gibson(he has been seen using different guitars). His main guitar is a Goldtop Gibson Les Paul Standard. His other tour guitars include another Gibson Les Paul and a Gibson Les Paul Double-Cutaway.

== Discography ==
=== The Occupants ===
- "I've been thinking" (2013 single)
- Hindsight (2014 EP)
