= The New Normal (album) =

2005 debut album by Australian rock band Cog

Studio album by Cog
- Released: 12 April 2005
- Recorded: 20 September – 10 November 2004
- Studio: Radiostar Studios (Weed, CA)
- Genre: Progressive rock
- Length: 73:06
- Label: Difrnt Music; MGM Distribution
- Producer: Sylvia Massy and Cog

Cog chronology
Open Up – Single (2003)	The New Normal (2005)	Sharing Space (2008)

Singles from The New Normal
- 1. "Real Life" Released: February 2005; 2. "My Enemy" Released: March 2005; 3. "Run" Released: August 2005; 4. "Resonate" Released: March 2006

The New Normal is the debut studio album by Australian rock band Cog, released on 12 April 2005 via Difrnt Music. The album was produced and recorded in Weed, California by Sylvia Massy (Tool, System of a Down, Spiderbait). The New Normal was made the album of the week on Triple J and at the J Award of 2005, the album was nominated for Australian Album of the Year. The album peaked at No. 19 on the ARIA Albums Chart.

== Background ==
The album's title was conceived in the aftermath of the September 11 attacks. Frontman Flynn Gower explained that the name originated from a United States social commentator who described the dramatic shift in lifestyle and societal norms. The commentator referred to the evolving social and political climate as 'the new normal', highlighting the significant and drastic changes that had occurred within a short period of time.

In September 2004 Cog met with Sylvia Massy in Weed, California to begin recording for the album. The album was recorded from 20 September 2004—10 November 2004 at Radiostar Studios, a retired 1930s art deco theatre that, according to the band, helped them get into a "different head space" for recording.

"Real Life", "My Enemy", "Run" and "Resonate" were released as radio singles in February, March, and August 2005, and also March 2006, respectively. "Real Life" was first released as a demo in late 2003, as part of Big Day Out's 2004 compilation. It was also the first song from the album to debut on the radio. The single itself was distributed to radio stations, street team members, as well as directly to some attendees of the Big Day Out '04 launch ceremony in Sydney, Australia at Utopia Records on 9 April 2005. "My Enemy" was included in the Triple J Hottest 100: Volume 13 compilation album released in March 2006 while "Run" was later featured in Triple J Hottest 100 Australian Albums of All Time released in July 2011.

== Lyrics and themes ==
Lyrically the album focuses heavily to articulate themes of new world globalisation in conjunction with government corruption and control. Flynn Gower described the lyrics as " recurring ideas of anger, alienation, isolation, dissension, disillusionment and disempowerment" as well as the feeling of exclusion from "the decision-making process" on both the local and national level. He went on to state that the album conveys "universal themes" that would express the feelings of Australians and people across the world who feel they need to "take the power back".

== Recording ==
Drummer Borich said, "It took about two months. We recorded it in an old art décor 1930s theatre. There was the stage, and like two hundred seats and then at the back of the room, the recording gear. So it was a totally different environment from a typical studio. You know it didn’t have that sterile vibe, something really different, which I think helped the music." He also praised producer Sylvia Massy who "spent years acquiring all of this great technology and sophisticated gear. So it was really good to be able to utilise that."

== Artwork ==
Various items of "modern protest" were featured within the panels of the digipack release including: a brick, lit torch, gas mask, cell phone, laptop and Molotov cocktail. The gas mask and Molotov cocktail included specific descriptions of the peripherals followed by notes on how they could be used as "identity concealment devices" and for "guerrilla warfare", respectively. Commenting on the protest theme, art director Daniel Parkinson stated "we decided on a clean stark look, using Times New Roman Font like a newspaper" in addition to "some strange 'anomaly' objects" portrayed as black balls floating above the desert floor. Furthermore, the front cover features an electric megaphone in accordance to the "modern protest" theme as well as "cog the new normal" in Braille. Flynn Gower stated the "starkness of the message" was "very clear and easy to decipher."

== Reception ==
Professional ratings
Review scores
Source	Rating
AllMusic	3/5 stars
Oz Music Project	4/5
Sputnikmusic	4.5/5
Ultimate Guitar	9.9/10

The New Normal received generally positive reviews and was well received overall, though it was not without its share of criticisms. Jody Macgregor of AllMusic stated: "Flynn Gower...sings with enough genuineness and passion to deliver political songs...without sounding trite." She described some of the rhymes as "a touch too obvious" while "[pushing] a simplistic melody...longer than it deserves", but assures "enough unexpected turns and blistering riffs" to conclude that "Cog are at their best concocting these apocalyptic epics."

The album entered the ARIA Charts on April 24, 2005, peaked at #19 and remained on the chart for three weeks. Moreover, the album was described by Triple J radio as "Australian heavy music fans have been holding out for" as well as "a massive sound, almost unbelievable for that of a three piece band." In 2005 the album was nominated for the J Award "Album of the Year" by Triple J.

== Track listing ==
All songs written, composed and performed by Cog.

No.	Title	Length
1.	"Real Life"	5:56
2.	"Anarchy OK"	6:22
3.	"Silence Is Violence"	7:39
4.	"Resonate"	4:31
5.	"The Spine"	7:11
6.	"My Enemy"	3:33
7.	"Run"	5:08
8.	"The River Song"	7:39
9.	"Charades"	3:59
10.	"Doors (Now and Then My Life Feels Like It's Going Nowhere)"	10:14
11.	"Naming the Elephant"	10:46
Total length:		73:06

== Charts ==
Chart (2005)	Peak position
Australian Albums (ARIA)	19

== Personnel ==
Cog

- Flynn Gower – lead vocals, guitar
- Lucius Borich – drums, backing vocals, samples
- Luke Gower – bass guitar, backing vocals

Production

- Cog – producer, album design
- Sylvia Massy – producer, mixing
- Rich Veltrop – co-producer, engineer, mixing
- Kale Holmes – mixing
- Cecil Gregory – studio assistant
- Seabrian Arata – Pro Tools editor
- Tom Baker – mastering
- Sean Boucher – recording & engineering (pre-production)
- Daniel Parkinson – art direction, graphic design, photography
- Andrzej Liguz – group photography
