= Floating Me =

Former rock band based in Sydney, Australia

- Origin: Sydney, New South Wales, Australia
- Genres: Progressive rock, hard rock
- Years active: 2009–present
- Labels: Cross Section
- Members: Andrew Gillespie; Antony Brown; Tobias Messiter; Jon Stockman; Tim Burcham
- Website: floatingme.com

Floating Me (sometimes stylised as FLOATINGME) were a progressive rock group from Sydney, Australia, featuring Lucius Borich from Cog, Jon Stockman of Karnivool and Andrew Gillespie, Antony Brown and Tobias Messiter from the '90s grunge/metal band Scary Mother. Their 2011 debut album entered the ARIA album chart at #90.

== History ==
Guitarist Antony Brown, singer Andrew Gillespie and keyboards-player Tobias Messiter had all previously worked together in the Sydney band Scary Mother. Also featuring bassist Dorian West and drummer Tim Burcham, Scary Mother formed in 1991 and released several singles and the album Tai Laeo (1994) before further progress stalled and the group parted ways. Some years later, Gillespie, Brown and Messiter began working on new material. Lucius Borich from Cog, who had known all three from his history touring with them in Juice and The Hanging Tree, was invited to collaborate on some material. By late 2009 it had become apparent to Borich that Cog was winding down as a full-time band, and so he joined FloatingMe permanently. During 2010 FloatingMe's album was ready to be recorded but the band still lacked a bass player. Jon Stockman of Karnivool was asked to record the bass parts and as Karnivool was taking a break to allow for singer Ian Kenny to concentrate on Birds of Tokyo, he too signed on to the new band. The album was recorded with producer Forrester Savell and released in April 2011.

The song "Sugar" was launched on the band's MySpace page as an introductory single in late 2010 and in early 2011 FloatingMe performed live for the first time, opening for Shihad in Wollongong. The band toured with Dead Letter Circus and in July 2011 co-headlined a three-date tour with Clint Boge of The Butterfly Effect's latest band Thousand Needles in Red. FloatingMe's self-titled album was nominated for an ARIA Award in the Hard Rock/Heavy Metal Album category.

== Band members ==
- Andrew Gillespie – lead vocals (2009–present)
- Antony Brown – guitars (2009–present)
- Tobias Messiter – keyboards (2009–present)
- Jon Stockman – bass (2009–present)

=== Past members ===
- Lucius Borich – drums (2009–2012)

== Discography ==
=== Albums ===
Title	Album details
Floating Me	Released: March 2011; Label: Cross Section (XSEC 011)

== Awards and nominations ==
=== ARIA Music Awards ===
The ARIA Music Awards are a set of annual ceremonies presented by Australian Recording Industry Association (ARIA), which recognise excellence, innovation, and achievement across all genres of the music of Australia. They commenced in 1987.

Year	Nominee / work	Award	Result	Ref.
2011	Floating Me	Best Hard Rock or Heavy Metal Album	Nominated	
