= Same Place =

Studio album by Bukkcity
- Released: January 2009
- Recorded: 2008
- Genre: Hip Hop
- Length: 32:01
- Label: Unda K9
- Producer: Avex, Damien Smith, Lui, Weapon X & Bukkcity

Same Place is the debut mini-album from Australian-American hip hop artist, Bukkcity. Originally meant for released in October 2008, due to several delays it wasn't released until January 2009, through Australian hip hop label, Unda K9 and MGM Distribution.

== Track listing ==
All lyrics written by Andre Knight, except where noted.

1. "Same Place" - 4:32
2. "Nobody Wanted This" (Andre Knight, Sarah Blasko) - 5:17
3. "Can’t Blame Me" - 4:11
4. "Who Knows (Who Cares)" - 3:22
5. "Reason To Leave" - 4:43
6. "Normality" (Produced by Weapon X) - 4:30
7. "Quiet" - 5:37
