= Big Dave =

Big Dave may refer to:

- Big Dave (character), comics character in 2000 AD
- Big Dave (rapper), Australian rapper
- Big Dave (wrestler), one of the two members of the UK Pitbulls
- Big Dave, a stage name of 20th century American musician Dave Cavanaugh
- Big Dave, nickname of footballer Darren Moore
- Big Dave, nickname of footballer Atdhe Nuhiu
- Big Dave, nickname of footballer Armand Gnanduillet
- Big Dave, nickname of politician David Cameron
- Big Dave, nickname of solicitor David Isaac
