= Domenic Carosa =

Australian businessman (born 1974)

- Born: 1974 (age 51–52); Melbourne, Australia
- Education: Australian Graduate School of Entrepreneurship
- Occupations: Co-Founder & Executive Chairman
- Employer: Future Capital Development Fund
- Known for: Founder & Chairman, Banxa Holdings Inc. Co-Founder, Destra Corporation; Co-Founder, Future Capital Development Fund

Domenic Carosa (born 1974) is an Australian businessman from Melbourne, Australia. Carosa was the co-founder of the digital music company, Destra Corporation. At the age of 25, Destra was listed on the Australian Securities Exchange, making Carosa the youngest CEO to manage a company on the Securities Exchange in Australian history.

Destra's assets were sold after the Opes Prime collapse in 2008, and Carosa became the founder of the Future Capital Development Fund in 2008. In 2014, the development fund diversified into bitcoin investment by launching the Future Capital Bitcoin Fund, which was the first of its kind in Australia.

In 2014 Carosa founded Banxa, a fiat-cryptocurrency payment processing company, that had initial public offering in 2021 and is currently listed in Toronto Venture Exchange.

Carosa is also the co-founder and CEO of the mobile Q&A company, Crowd Mobile.

== Early life and education ==
Carosa was born in Melbourne, Australia in 1974. Carosa attended the Australian Graduate School of Entrepreneurship where he earned a Master of Entrepreneurship and Innovation.

== Career ==
Carosa began his career while he was a teenager by co-founding the media and entertainment company Destra with his sister in 1993. The company was originally called Sprint and owned entertainment websites in Australia. He was 25 years old when Destra was first publicly listed on the Australian Securities Exchange, making him the youngest CEO in Australian history. Carosa officially launched the Destra Corporation brand in 2004, and in 2005 announced first year revenue of over $15 million. In 2004, Destra Corporation announced a large deal with Yahoo! to integrate a new suite of services with OzHosting.com's Web hosting service.

Destra reverse-listed on the exchange just prior to the dot-com crash in 2000. Carosa diversified the company into a web hosting company following the crash, and later led it to become a $100 million company and the second largest web hosting company in Australia.

Carosa's company was greatly affected by the collapse of Opes Prime in 2008. After the collapse, Carosa had his stake reduced in the company to less than 1%, at which point he shifted from Managing Director to the role of a consultant for the company.

=== Crowd Mobile ===
In 2009, Carosa launched Crowd Mobile, a mobile company where users pay experts to answer their questions, each billed at a set amount. In 2015, Carosa's Crowd Mobile announced that it would be acquiring the Dutch firm, Track Holdings for $35 million AUD. During the same year, the company also raised an additional $2 million in a round of funding and also acquired Any Questions Answered (AQA Mobile) for $165,000.

Crowd Mobile again featured in the media in early 2016, after it reached monthly revenues of $4.1 million. The questions and answers website at that stage had reached over 1,000 experts answering questions in over 30 different languages.

Following the operational restructuring in 2019, Crowd Mobile Saw a notable turnover, led by CEO Domenic Carosa and chairman Steven Schapera. Schapera is the co-founder of BECCA Cosmetics, a company acquired by cosmetics organisation Estee Lauder in a buyout worth a reported AU$300 million. Additionally, along with the restructure at the start of the year the organisation changed its name from Crowd Mobile to Crowd Media Holdings Limited.

=== Crowd Media ===
Carosa serves as Crowd Media’s CEO and Executive Director. Crowd Media covers more than 30 languages on five continents. In June 2020, Carosa led Crowd Media in raising US$1.5 million in capital in a heavily subscribed placement. Via Entering into a commerce agreement with VITAL Innovations, a London-based manufacturer of newborn and health products, Crowd Media committed to leveraging social media, social commerce, and the influencer market, selling the Vital Family, Vital Baby, and SuperSafe ranges to European markets. As part of the deal, VITAL purchased five million Crowd Media shares, providing a cash injection to bolster sales by funding strategic marketing initiatives. The deal saw Crowd Media’s share price rise by 17.9 cents%, selling at 3.3 cents each on 16 June 2020.

=== Future Capital Development Fund ===
Around the same time Crowd Mobile launched he founded Future Capital Development Fund, which focused primarily on early stage startups. Within the first two years, the Future Capital Development Fund raised more than $3 million for acquisitions, through an initial offering of shares. By late 2010, Carosa expected "to raise between $10m and $20m from a public float of FCDF later this year or early next year, depending on market conditions."

By the end of 2012, FCDF had acquired 3 large stakes in three online companies, Our Wishing Well, Domain Folio 1 and SMS Central Australia.

Carosa launched the Future Capital Bitcoin Fund in 2014. The bitcoin-based fund is considered the first dedicated bitcoin investment fund in Australia.

=== Harris Technology Group ===
Between 2013 and 2016, Domenic Carosa served as non-executive director of Harris Technology Group Limited as part of the merger with Shoply.

=== Collaborate Corporation ===
Between 2014 and 2016, Domenic Carosa served as non-executive director of Collaborate Corporation Limited (CL8).
