= Superengine =

Australian musical group

- Origin: Perth, Western Australia, Australia
- Genres: Indie pop
- Years active: 2003–present
- Labels: Independent; Qstik Records/MGM Distribution
- Members: Renee Bingham; Elliott Brannen; Ali Brown; Jon Fernandes; Melanie Price; Eric Thern
- Past members: Tim Lowe; Kae Muto; Chris Doropoulos; Jimmy Murphy; Rohan Ford
- Website: Website

Superengine are an Australian indie pop band originating from Perth, Western Australia. They have performed with bands such as Angus and Julia Stone, Charles Jenkins (Icecream Hands), Dappled Cities Fly, The Panda Band, Schvendes, Faith in Plastics, the Autumn Isles and Institut Polaire.

== History ==
=== Formation ===
Superengine descended from the Perth group 'Mister Tickle' (1996–2002).

=== Early years ===
From 2003 to 2005, Superengine had only a demo recording and live shows to showcase their talent. Even so, the demo was played substantially on local radio stations, especially RTRFM, amongst others. Superengine performed at RTRFM's 'In the Pines' event in 2005 to critical acclaim.

... A spin off of cutesy soul / funk / etc band Mr Tickle, Superengine are true to their past, but with a more Motown-flavoured addition to the already successful mix. Upbeat, major key funk is always going to have a 'party' vibe to it and to say how big the market is for this stuff in WA (Freo especially) Superengine's fanbase is already out there waiting for them.

=== Triangulation ===
The debut EP "Triangulation (Independent/MGM Distribution - recorded at Studio Couch and produced by Shaun O'Callaghan) was released in November 2005 to a healthy dose of local airplay in Perth, Western Australia, and a smattering of playings on Triple J and the east coast of Australia. Triangulation as an EP opened the door to many gigs and a new focus on releasing a full length album. It "features two remixes by Perth sound-smiths Chrism and Fenris".

=== Intermittent Lies ===
Released as a single in May 2007, "Intermittent Lies" received local and national airplay in Perth and Australia including RTRFM and Triple J. Zan Rowe's 'Morning's with Zan' on Triple J chose "Intermittent Lies" as the 'Catch of the Day'.

"The western state keeps producing top notch pop, from the likes of The Panda Band and Institut Polaire (to name but two). New band on the scene Superengine have just released a great sunny single too, filled with harmony and light and a rollicking backbeat. "Intermittent Lies" is a good sign of things to come, and is my catch of the day today."

"Intermittent Lies" was added to Triple J rotation only two weeks after its release.

=== Shadows Meet ===
The product of nearly a year of studio time (November 2006 to July 2007) at Bold Park Recording studios in Leederville, Shadows Meet was released at the end of August 2007 through QStik Records with MGM Distribution. Shadows Meet is Superengine's first full-length album.

=== 2008 Australia Tour ===
Superengine completed an Australian tour in early April 2008 - briefly visiting Adelaide, Melbourne, Brisbane and Sydney.

== Members ==
- Renee Bingham - guitar, lead vocals
- Elliott Brannen - trumpet
- Ali Brown - keyboards, backing vocals
- Jon Fernandes - bass guitars, keyboards, lead vocals
- Melanie Price - trombone, xylophone, backing vocals
- Eric Thern - drums

== Discography ==
- Triangulation (EP) (November 2005)
- "Intermittent Lies" (Single) (May 2007)
- Shadows Meet (LP) (August 2007)
