= The Hanging Tree (band) =

Australian band (1992–2002)

- Origin: Sydney, New South Wales, Australia
- Genres: Progressive metal; stoner rock
- Years active: 1992–2002
- Label: Scratch M
- Past members: Flynn Gower; Rohan Mellick; Daniel Parkinson; Emmy Walters; Lucius Borich; Paul Ermer; David Romeo; Jason Bremmell; Justin Leef

The Hanging Tree were an Australian progressive metal, stoner rock band formed in 1992 by Flynn Gower on guitar, Rohan Mellick on guitar, Daniel Parkinson on bass guitar and Emmy Walters on lead vocals. They were joined in 1995 by Lucius Borich on drums (ex-Juice). They issued a self-titled album in August 1996. Borich and Gower left the group later that year and, in 1998, formed Cog. Parkinson and Walters continued with new members until the Hanging Tree disbanded in 2002.

== History ==
The Hanging Tree were formed as a progressive metal group in 1992 in Sydney by Flynn Gower on guitar, Rohan Mellick on guitar, Daniel Parkinson (son of singer-songwriter, Doug Parkinson) on bass guitar and Emmy Walters on lead vocals. They had no permanent drummer during their early years. In early 1995 former Juice member Lucius Borich (son of guitarist, Kevin Borich) joined on drums. Gower later told Debbie Kruger of APRAP, "While writing music was a collaborative effort, lyric writing was always the domain of the lead singer, in that case Walters."

The band began to establish a healthy following and reputation, particularly in their home territory where they could consistently pull impressive crowds, even to 1000-capacity venues such as the Narrabeen Sands. Their debut self-titled album appeared on the Scratch M label in August 1996. According to Australian musicologist, Ian McFarlane, they, "fused crunching, down-tuned, blues-derived guitar riffs with a rhythmic swing to arrive at a sound reminiscent of retro-metal masters Monster Magnet and Kyuss."

Despite an excellent self-titled album of dark and moody, stoner rock based heavy metal, a Fear Factory support, and a notable live broadcast on Triple J's Australian Music Show, the Hanging Tree found it difficult to make headway beyond their own turf and split up at the end of 1996 when Borich left to pursue a session career in the United States.

Some time later the remaining members (minus Mellick and Borich) reformed the band with guitarist Paul Ermer and a new drummer and continued for some 18 months. Once again, however, despite being one of Sydney's more popular live bands The Hanging Tree split. After a break of almost three years, Parkinson and Walters reformed the band with a new line-up including Faceplant guitarist David Romeo, and quickly released an EP that hinted at a somewhat different musical direction, a combination of their old style and injections of nu metal and hardcore. This incarnation split in late 2002.

Flynn Gower and Lucius Borich, in 1998, formed rock band Cog.

Daniel Parkinson (son of Australian singing icon, Doug Parkinson) continues to work on graphic design and photography through his studio, notably designing the cover and booklet art to Cog's debut album The New Normal. Daniel took up bass and vocal duties with Sydney prog band Los Alamos, that released an E.P. named Burn Down. Build. Burn Again. He has also completed a solo E.P. in 2013 with Borich on drums named Ajax Prayed For Light.

Flynn Gower formed a new project in 2013 named the Occupants, with brother Luke and achieved high rotation on Triple J with their first release.

Emmy Walters formed nu metal band Beacon with Krishna Jones from Juice, Juggernaut and others in 2002.

Lucius Borich has recently featured in bands Floating Me, and currently the Nerve.

== Discography ==
- The Hanging Tree (1996) Scratch M
- Pieces (EP) (2000)
- Peace, Order, Unity (2002, unreleased)

== Band members ==
=== 1995 ===
- Daniel Parkinson (bass)
- Emmy Walters (vocals)
- Lucius Borich (drums)
- Rohan Mellick (guitar)
- Flynn Gower (guitar)

=== 1996 ===
- Daniel Parkinson (bass)
- Emmy Walters (vocals)
- Lucius Borich (drums)
- Flynn Gower (guitar)
- Paul Ermer (guitar)
- David Romeo (guitar)

=== 2000 ===
- Daniel Parkinson (bass)
- David Romeo (guitar)
- Emmy Walters (vocals)
- Jason Bremmell (guitar)
- Justin Leef (drums)
