= Scary Mother =

Australian rock band

- Origin: Sydney, New South Wales, Australia
- Genres: Rock
- Years active: 1990–1995
- Labels: MDS; ATI/Mushroom/Festival
- Past members: Dario Bortolin; Anthony Brown; Tim Burcham; Andrew Gillespie; Toby Messiter; Dorian West

Scary Mother (also styled as Scarymother) were an Australian rock band. They were formed in 1990. Anthony Brown on lead guitar, Tim Burcham on drums, Andrew Gillespie on lead vocals and Toby (Tobias) Messiter (ex-Wildland) on keyboards. They released a self-titled three-track extended play in August 1992 via Mushroom Records' distributor MDS.

Scary Mother supported Faith No More in April and May 1993. The Australian group's first single, "Lord of the Flies", was issued to coincide with the tour and was produced by Matt Wallace (Faith No More). It was co-written by Brown, Burcham and Gillespie. They followed with their sole studio album, Tai Laeo (Thai for 'already gone') in May 1994. It was produced by Rick Will for ATI/Mushroom Records/Festival Records.

Australian musicologist, Ian McFarlane, described how, "[they] played a brooding, melodic brand of rock fleshed out by sweeping, atmospheric keyboard flourishes and barely restrained passion. Frontman Andrew Gillespie's vocals were likened variously to Pearl Jam's Eddie Vedder and The Cult's Ian Astbury, which was a good indication of [their] musical gambit." Brown, Gillespie and Messiter formed progressive rockers, Floating Me, in 2009, with Lucius Borich from Cog and Jon Stockman of Karnivool.

== Band members ==
- Tim Burcham – drums
- Anthony Brown – guitar
- Andrew Gillespie – vocals
- Toby Messiter – keyboards
- Dorian West – bass guitar

== Discography ==
=== Albums ===
List of albums, with selected details and chart positions
Title	Details	Peak chart positions
Title	Details	AUS
Tai Laeo	Released: May 1994; Label: ATI, Mushroom, Festival (D31157); Format: CD	94

=== Extended plays ===
- Scary Mother (1992) – MDS

=== Singles ===
- "Lord of the Flies" (1993) AUS #132
- "Who are You?" (1993)
- "Looking Down" (1994)
