= Sharing Space =

Studio album by Cog
- Released: 12 April 2008
- Recorded: January – November 2007
- Genre: Progressive rock, alternative metal
- Length: 72:41
- Label: Difrnt Music, MGM Distribution
- Producer: Sylvia Massy and Cog

Cog chronology
| The New Normal (2005) | Sharing Space (2008) | Just Visiting (2008) |

Singles from Sharing Space
- 1. "What If" Released: 3 November 2007; 2. "Bird of Feather" Released: 15 March 2008

Sharing Space is the second full-length album by Australian rock band Cog, released on 12 April 2008. The album was, once again, produced by Sylvia Massy in Weed, California. The album peaked at number 2 on the ARIA album chart.

At the J Awards of 2008, the album was nominated for Australian Album of the Year.

== Background ==
Following the success of the previous album, Cog once again chose to record the follow-up at RadioStar Studios in Weed, California with Sylvia Massy. Comfortable with the studio space, the band expected a fluid process of recording the album in only 4 months, however a label takeover during production left Cog and producer Massy casting about for more than 8 months. Sharing Space was released exactly three years after its predecessor. Commenting on the ordeal, drummer Lucius Borich said "Sometimes you have to struggle through in order to come up with the goods musically. Otherwise it's not going to have any validity or longevity."

The title "Sharing Space" was inspired by the people and atmosphere the band encountered in Weed, California. Borich, detailing the origin of the term, said “Living and hanging around some of the awesome people we befriended in Weed, instead of saying ‘see you later’ or ‘good to see you’, the phrase they would use instead was ‘it’s been great sharing space with you.’ To me, those simple words made the experience seem a lot more important, and I took it back to the band and said ‘let’s call one of the song’s Sharing Space. The boys liked it so much they said how bout we call the album Sharing Space?”

== Lyrics and themes ==
Flynn Gower stated that after three years from the last album the band had made a "conscious decision" to produce something "very different from our previous albums" and avoid releasing a "New Normal Part 2". In this pursuit, Gower made a deliberate intent to alter their approach to writing the album in that "this time we really tried to nail things. We tried to be as articulate and clear as we could in an effort to get to the heart of the songs" as opposed to the previous effort which he described as "more impressionistic or abstract".

Speaking on the major themes of the album Lucius Borich identified "research into 9/11" and "occult and political subjects" as information that "just needed to get out”. He went on to specify that “sometimes you have to be literal and get to the guts of it, rather than be all airy-fairy and obtuse.” Borich described the sounds and themes were an attempt "to create a freedom in COG’s sound" one that was "not limited by what instruments or style we use". He went on to encapsulate the feel of the album as "a real genuine heart-on-our-sleeves musical statement. We’ve really tried to explore as many possibilities in what music has to offer.”

The sample at the beginning of "The Movie's Over" was a speech given by Mario Savio on December 2, 1964 at the University of California, Berkeley on the steps of Sproul Hall.

== Reception ==
Professional ratings
Review scores
| Source | Rating |
|---|---|
| AllMusic | 3.5/5 stars |
| Metal Storm | 8/10 |
| World of Music | 3/5 stars |

Upon release Sharing Space was generally well received garnering mostly positive reviews. Stewart Mason of AllMusic observed that Cog "expanded the parameters of their sound" to include: "angst rock", "slow builds to eventual explosions" and even "potential radio fodder". He also commented that the "alternative metal sound" remained intact due, in part to producer Sylvia Massy with a "clean but assertive [sound]" and concludes that "Cog smartly build on their strengths here."

Three songs from the album featured in the Triple J Hottest 100 in 2007 and 2008 collectively; with "What If" at 47 in 2007, "Bird of a Feather" at 31 and "Are You Interested?" at 97 in 2008.

== Track listing ==
All songs written, composed and performed by Cog.

| No. | Title | Length |
|---|---|---|
| 1. | "No Other Way" | 9:55 |
| 2. | "Are You Interested?" | 3:41 |
| 3. | "The Movie's Over" | 6:39 |
| 4. | "What If" | 4:18 |
| 5. | "Bird of Feather" | 3:43 |
| 6. | "Swamp" | 5:22 |
| 7. | "Sharing Space" | 5:35 |
| 8. | "Say Your Last Goodbye" | 4:04 |
| 9. | "How Long" | 3:26 |
| 10. | "The Town of Lincoln" | 4:18 |
| 11. | "Bitter Pills" | 7:33 |
| 12. | "Four Walls" | 4:11 |
| 13. | "Problem Reaction Solution" | 9:14 |
| Total length: | | 72:41 |

== Personnel ==
Cog

- Flynn Gower – lead vocals, guitar
- Lucius Borich – drums, backing vocals, samples
- Luke Gower – bass guitar, backing vocals

Production

- Cog – producer, album design
- Sylvia Massy – production, mixing
- Rich Veltrop – production, mixing
- Jim Wood – production, keyboards
- Maor Appelbaum – mixing
- Jason Benham – tracking

== Charts ==
| Chart (2008) | Peak position |
|---|---|
| Australian Albums (ARIA) | 2 |

== Certifications ==
| Region | Certification | Certified units/sales |
|---|---|---|
| Australia (ARIA) | Gold | 35,000^{^} |
^{^} Shipments figures based on certification alone.
