= Bukkcity =

American rapper

- Born: Andre Knight; June 4, 1980 (age 46); Canberra, Australia
- Origin: (United States) Irvington, New Jersey
- Genres: Hip Hop
- Occupation: Rapper
- Years active: 1998–present
- Label: Unda K9 Records
- Website: www.myspace.com/bukkcity

Andre Knight (born June 4, 1980, in Canberra, Australia), better known by his stage name Bukkcity, is an Australian-American rapper who is currently signed to the Unda K9 Records record label.

== Biography ==
=== Early life ===
Bukkcity was born Andre Knight in Canberra, Australia to an African American father and a South African mother. At the age of one, his family moved back to the United States, relocating to Irvington, New Jersey. His father departed the family soon after, and the family moved several more times. He struggled being the only young male in the household with his single parent mother and two sisters, in a place of ubiquitous violence, drugs and more violence. After numerous altercations with the law, he found himself in and out of state penitentiaries, including a one-year sentence for assaulting an undercover police officer. During his troubled adolescence, Bukkcity witnessed the death of his cousin shot in gang-crossfire in New York City and the loss of his younger sister to a heroin overdose.

Against his will, Bukkcity's mother forced him to move back to Australia to live with his sister at the age of 21. Although he did not know it at the time, his move to Melbourne was a major crossroad in his life, which he now says, was probably the move that saved his life. The move had allowed him to move on from a troubled past and to focus on his life and music.

=== Music career ===
Bukkcity began to make a name for himself in 1998; entering underground freestyle competitions in New York. His move back to Australia saw the beginning of his career battling live on the Melbourne radio station PBS 106.7FM. He featured on mixtapes and albums in Sweden, Germany, Atlanta and New York and became one of the most downloaded hip-hop artists on MySpace Australia. In 2007 he released his first mixtape release, 1st & 15th Mixtape, putting him on the local radar. His second release, Underbelly: The Mixtape, was a concept album inspired by the characters of the popular Underbelly TV Series. Although the mixtape generated ill-informed controversy for its presumed glorification of gangland activities, it was widely lauded by critics and listeners both inside and outside the hip-hop scene. Both mixtapes were offered as free digital downloads.

Since 2007, Bukkcity has appeared on tours with hip-hop legend Ice Cube, Paris (of Public Enemy and Dead Prez fame), Brisbane hip-hop group Butterfingers, DJ Rectangle and Snob Scrilla.

In 2009, Bukkcity's long-awaited mini-album debut Same Place was released by Unda K9 Records and distributed through MGM Distribution. The album contains seven tracks including the single 'Nobody Wanted This' featuring Sarah Blasko.

== Acceptance in Australian hip-hop ==
Initially, Bukkcity struggled to win over his Australian audiences. He quickly discovered that the local hip-hop scene was very different both lyrically and in content from his cultural hip-hop upbringing in America. Bukkcity admitted that on moving back he felt an instant segregation in the local hip-hop scene. Australian emcees related to their audience on a local level, a level he genuinely did not understand at first upon his arrival back to the land of Oz, but has since grown to understand and deeply respect.

“Coming back to Australia wasn’t initially to do music, it was to get away from things that were going on over in the USA, so I just wanted to come here and start a new life, start over. When I did get into hip-hop and started making music, it was a little bit awkward because previous American artists had left a bad taste in the hip-hop scene’s mouth – they expected every American that comes is going to be on that level. The attitude was ‘you’re American therefore you must think you’re great.’ In turn, they would have resentment against you, without even giving you a chance. I felt like the black Eminem in this country. It wasn’t the colour issue that bothered me; it was more about the lack of lyrical acceptance and respect people had back then for different cultural backgrounds, each other’s life story and opinions. It was like they didn’t want to acknowledge my lyrical contribution to the scene, you had to either conform to the Oz Hip-Hop style or your individual story or opinion was lost, especially mine, I’m a black Afro-American who grew up in the US and naturally spoke with an American accent. It was a real issue for the local hip-hop scene and still is to a degree, it was a weird feeling being ostracized for ’being me’ in hip-hop. I do think things have changed over the last couple of years, everyone seems to be more relaxed and receptive and more willing to hear your story and give you a go. The great thing is that at the time, I slowly became accepted by a lot of listeners from other musical genres, which is why my album has different musical influences in the production” ” - Bukkcity

His underground mixtape releases, extensive touring and community hip-hop workshops have since lead towards bridging the cultural gap.

== Awards ==
- Winner of the Nokia Urban Song of The Year for the song “Days Have Gone” (2006)
- Winner of the MusicOz Best Urban Award for the song “Days Have Gone” (2007)
- Winner of the MusicOz Best Urban Award for the single “Nobody Wanted This” (2008)
- Winner of the MusicOz Best Urban Artist (2008)

== Discography ==
=== Mixtapes ===
- 1st & 15th Mixtape (2007)
- Underbelly: The Mixtape (2008)

=== Albums ===
- Same Place (2009)

=== Guest appearances ===
- "Come Get It" by Ace Wonder Vs. Mark 'Chopper' Read (2008)
