= The Little Stevies =

Australian band

- Origin: Melbourne, Victoria, Australia
- Years active: 2006–present
- Labels: Independent/Love Your Records/MGM Distribution (AUS/NZ); 45 Records (North America)
- Members: Bethany 'Beth' Stephen; Sibylla 'Byll' Stephen
- Past members: Josh Barber; Robin Geradts-Gill
- Website: www.thelittlestevies.com

The Little Stevies are an Australian band from Melbourne.

Originally a trio, the band were 'Unearthed' by Triple J and featured as a Triple J 'Next Crop' artist in 2006 after the release of their first EP. They have been variously described as 'alt-pop', 'folk/pop' and 'indie'. They have toured extensively throughout Australia and North America. They released their debut EP, Grow Up, in 2006 which was followed up by the album Love Your Band in 2009. The video for 'Sunshower', the first single taken from Love Your Band, was nominated for Best Film Clip at the Inside Film Awards in 2009. Their second album, Attention Shoppers, produced by Ethan Allen and recorded in Los Angeles, was released in March 2011. Their records are released independently in Australia where they are distributed through MGM Distribution. In North America, The Little Stevies are signed to Canadian label 45 Records, a subsidiary of Universal Music Group.

In 2015, The Little Stevies founded Teeny Tiny Stevies, a parallel band of original children's songs.

== Discography ==
- 2004 - The Little Stevies
- 2006 - Grow Up (EP)
- 2009 - Love Your Band
- 2011 - Attention Shoppers
- 2012 - Most Requested Live (2009-2012)
- 2013 - Diamonds For Your Tea
- 2015 - Useful Songs For Little People (as Teeny Tiny Stevies)
- 2018 - Helpful Songs For Little People (as Teeny Tiny Stevies)
- 2019 - Stopped Wishing I Was Somewhere Else
