= Bad Moon Born =

Australian hard rock band

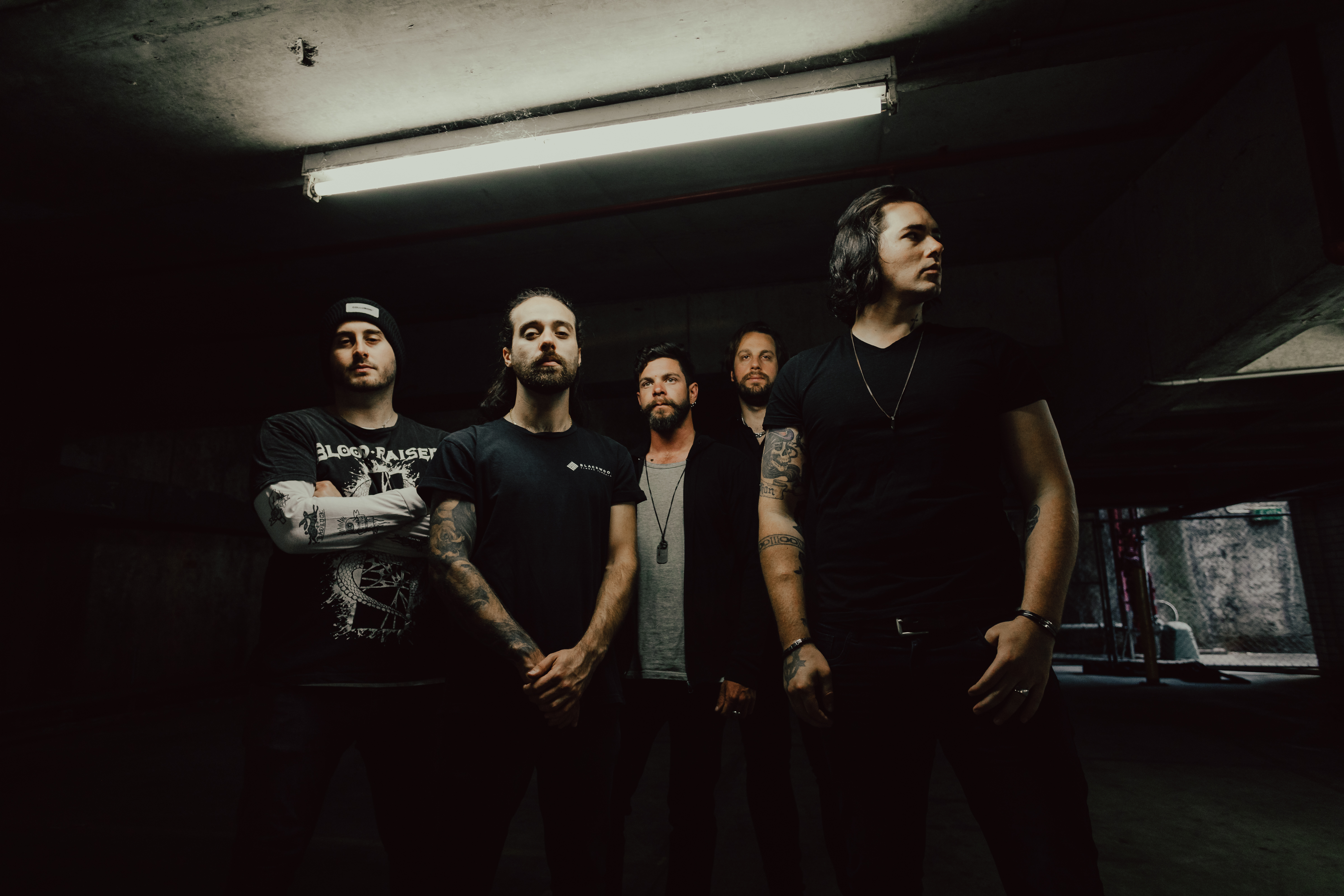

Background information
- Origin: Sydney, New South Wales, Australia
- Genres: Hard rock
- Years active: 2015–present
- Members: Jordan von Grae; Voya; Ned Koncar; Shane Robinson; John Ezilmez
- Past members: Frank Lakoudis; Nick Allen
- Website: badmoonborn.com

Bad Moon Born are an Australian five-piece Hard rock band, formed in 2015. The band consists of Jordan von Grae (Vocals), Voya (Guitar), Ned Koncar (Guitar), Shane Robinson (Bass) & John Ezilmez (Drums).

== History ==
Their debut EP, Chemical Lullabies, was released on 23 April 2016, drawing influences from Guns N' Roses, Audioslave, Avenged Sevenfold and Alter Bridge.

In November 2016 they signed to Mushroom Group subsidiary, Premier Artists, then signing to MGM Distribution in early 2017 and American booking agency TKO in mid-2018. They released their single, "Alive?", in June 2018, which had been recorded with Kato Khandwala producing.

2019 saw the band release their sophomore EP, War Is One, which was received favourably by both fans and music critics alike. In July of the same year, it was announced that vocalist and co-founder Frank Lakoudis had made the decision to leave the band, and that Jordan von Grae (Carmeria) would be taking on vocal duties effective immediately.

The group then embarked on a nationwide tour, in support of Buckcherry and Hardcore Superstar. The new lineup was met with exceedingly positive reviews, with many commending the band on their musical prowess and stage presence. Following the tour, it was decided that the band would take on a heavier, and more modern approach to their music, and would move towards developing a sound similar to bands like Architects (British Band), Bring Me the Horizon, and Asking Alexandria.

The band released a tongue-in-cheek cover of Billie Eilish's 'Bad Guy' in August 2020, which amassed over 100,000 streams on Spotify. Towards the end of 2020, co-founder and bass player Nick Allen announced he would be departing the group. He was replaced by Shane Robinson.

Bad Moon Born entered 2021 with a plan to release 5 consecutive singles within a 12-month period, known collectively as The Heart From the Hollow series. The first four singles from this body of work achieved national airplay and international recognition, with the fifth and final installment, titled Light Leaves the Day landing the group with a feature on Rolling Stone's In My Room Series. The band then released a cover of NSYNC's hit single 'It's Gonna Be Me' which was accompanied by an east coast tour of Australia. Bad Moon Born then opted to go on a one-year hiatus through 2023 for personal reasons.

2024 has seen the band return in fine form, bringing back their classic rock sound and locking in international support slots for Candlebox and The Struts in January and February, respectively. This year has also seen Bad Moon Born re-sign with Silverback Agency, and the 5-piece are now in the studio refining demos for their highly anticipated debut album, expected to release some time in 2024/2025.

== Discography ==
=== Extended Plays ===
- The Heart From the Hollow - Singles Collection (2021-2022)

No.	Title	Length
1.	"The Heart From the Hollow"	4:08
2.	"Reins"	3:57
3.	"Fallout"	4:02
4.	"Waves (of the Wild)"	3:45
5.	"Light Leaves the Day"	3:04
Total length:		18:56

- War Is One (2019)

No.	Title	Length
1.	"War Is One"	2:56
2.	"Witch Trials"	3:10
3.	"Face To Face"	3:42
4.	"Alive?"	4:04
5.	"Road Warrior"	3:36
6.	"Dogs"	2:54
Total length:		20:25

- Chemical Lullabies (2016)

No.	Title	Length
1.	"Promised Land"	4:58
2.	"Chemical Lullaby"	4:11
3.	"Drowning"	4:18
4.	"Carry On"	3:55
5.	"Beauty & Fury"	5:19
Total length:		22:41

=== Singles ===
- "Alive?" (2018)
- "Witch Trials" (2018)

-

- "Noxa" (2020)
- "Bad Guy" (2020)

-

- "The Heart From the Hollow" (2021)
- "Reins" (2021)
- "Fallout" (2021)
- "Waves (of the Wild)" (2021)
- "Light Leaves the Day" (2022)

-

- "It's Gonna Be Me" (2022)
