= Teeny Tiny Stevies =

Australian children's music group

- Origin: Melbourne, Victoria, Australia
- Genre: Children's
- Years active: 2015–present
- Label: ABC Kids
- Members: Bethany 'Beth' Stephen; Sibylla 'Byll' Stephen
- Website: www.teenytinystevies.com

Teeny Tiny Stevies are an ARIA Award and AIR Award-winning Australian children's music group established in 2015 by sisters Bethany 'Beth' and Sibylla 'Byll' Stephen. The Stephen sisters also perform as the indie folk band The Little Stevies.

== Biography ==
Writers and sisters Byll and Beth Stephen, created Teeny Tiny Stevies as a side project to their music career. They've since gone on to win ARIA & AIR Awards, and written, recorded and performed for Play School, Sesame Studios, ABC Kids and Gardening Australia.

In 2015, Beth Stephen and Byll Stephen started writing children's songs. Prompted by Byll Stephen's experience with her three-year-old child, the pair wrote a song about the challenges of toilet training before writing and recording a full-length album.

Teeny Tiny Stevies' debut album Useful Songs for Little People was offered to the public through The Little Stevies' website and featured the songs "I Ate a Rainbow" and "Family (Love Is Love)". One of the tracks from the album, "Baby in Mum's Tummy", was a finalist in the International Songwriting Competition

After performing at shows and festivals, the band's second album, Helpful Songs For Little People, was released in February 2018 by ABC Kids, and was nominated for the ARIA Award for Best Children's Album. The album features the singles "Boss of My Own Body" and "Boy Or Girl Colour".

In April 2020, the band shared a new song on social media, called "Stay Home", which helped explain the COVID-19 pandemic to children.

Teeny Tiny Stevies' third studio album, Thoughtful Songs for Little People was released August 2020, featuring the singles "Had You to Teach Me", "Superpower" and "Good for Your Health". The album won the 2020 ARIA Award for Best Children's Album, and also won the Best Children's Album at the 2021 AIR Independent Music Awards.

Their debut picture book 'Boss of Your Own Body', published through Harper Collins, was nominated for the ABIA Award for Best Children's Book in 2022. Their other books that have been produced based on their songs, 'Family, all that you dream it to be', 'Sleep Through the Night', 'How Brave I Can Be' and 'Christmas Days in the Sunshine' are read by families all over Australia.

In May 2022, the band released their fourth studio album, How to Be Creative, featuring singles "Collaborate" and "How Am I Different". A ten song masterclass breaking down the concept of creativity, taking the listener through the journey of how creativity is achieved. How to Be Creative won the 2023 AIR Award for Best Independent Children's Album.

In November 2022, the band released the EP, What Rhymes with Christmas?, featuring songs "December", "Christmas in Summer", "Three" and "Biscuits".

Teeny Tiny Stevies' fifth studio album, The Green Album was released April 2024, featuring singles "Babyccino", "Energy" and "Climate Change". It is a collection of songs created so that families of any description can enjoy listening together as they learn and relearn that small positive changes do have a profound impact in this world.

In October 2024, the band collaborated with Zoos Victoria to tell the story of the re-discovered Victorian Grassland Earless Dragon, with their song and music video release "A Tiny Dragon". The song and music video are on high rotation in the Dragon Disco at the Melbourne Zoo.

== Animated Music Videos ==
Teeny Tiny Stevies' music videos, animated by illustrator Simon Howe, are broadcast regularly on ABC Kids TV, and on Amazon Prime.

Sesame Studios produced a video for the song 'By My Side'.

== Discography ==
=== Albums ===
List of albums, with selected chart positions and certifications
Title	Album details	Peak chart position
Title	Album details	AUS
Useful Songs for Little People	Released: 13 December 2015; Label: Love Your Records; Formats: CD, DD, streaming	—
Helpful Songs for Little People	Released: 16 February 2018; Label: ABC Kids; Formats: CD, DD, streaming	—
Thoughtful Songs for Little People	Released: 7 August 2020; Label: ABC Kids; Formats: CD, DD, streaming	33
How to Be Creative	Released: 27 May 2022; Label: ABC Kids; Formats: CD, DD, streaming	—
The Green Album	Released: 22 April 2024; Label: ABC Kids; Formats: DD, streaming	
Brain Fart	Released: 11 July 2025; Label: Love Your Records; Formats: DD, streaming	

=== Extended plays ===
List of EPs, with selected details
Title	Details
What Rhymes with Christmas	Released: 11 November 2022; Label: ABC Kids; Formats: CD, DD, streaming

== Awards and nominations ==
=== AIR Awards ===
The Australian Independent Record Awards (known colloquially as the AIR Awards) is an annual awards night to recognise, promote and celebrate the success of Australia's Independent Music sector.

Year	Nominee / work	Award	Result	Ref.
2021	Thoughtful Songs for Little People	Best Independent Children's Album or EP	Won	
2023	How to Be Creative	Best Independent Children's Album or EP	Won	
2025	The Green Album	Best Independent Children's Album or EP	Won	
2026	Brain Fart	Best Independent Children's Album or EP	Won	

=== ARIA Music Awards ===
The ARIA Music Awards is an annual awards ceremony that recognises excellence, innovation, and achievement across all genres of Australian music.

Year	Nominee / work	Award	Result	Ref.
2018	Helpful Songs for Little People	Best Children's Album	Nominated	
2020	Thoughtful Songs for Little People	Best Children's Album	Won	
2022	How to Be Creative	Best Children's Album	Nominated	
2025	Brain Fart	Best Children's Album	Nominated	
