= Finch (Australian band) =

Australian rock band

- Also known as: Stillwater, Contraband
- Origin: Sydney, New South Wales, Australia
- Genres: Hard rock, pub rock
- Years active: 1972 (Stillwater); 1973–1978 (Finch); 1978–1979 (Contraband)
- Labels: Picture, Rainbow, Eagle, CBS/Epic, Portrait
- Past members: see Members list below

Finch was an Australian hard and pub rock band, initially forming as Stillwater in 1972. In 1973, they changed to Finch and in 1978 they changed their name to Contraband. The band disbanded in 1979.

== History ==
=== 1972–1975: Beginnings and Drouyn ===
Stillwater formed in 1972 in Sydney as a hard rock band but changed their name to Finch following year. The line-up of Finch was Peter McFarlane on drums, Owen Orford on lead vocals, Bob Spencer on lead guitar, and Tony Strain on bass guitar.

In 1973, they won a 2SM/Pepsi Pop Poll, earning a contract with Picture Records. In January 1974, the group released their debut single, "Out of Control"/And She Sings", while Spencer was still in high school.

In 1974, Finch contributed to the soundtrack album for the surfing film, Drouyn, which featured surfing world champion, Peter Drouyn. Finch's tracks, "Sail Away", "Lady of Truth" and "Roses" were used in contrast to "jazzy incidental material". The Canberra Times' Michael Foster noted the "sound is no less compelling, and perhaps is more evocative because it is less insistent on the one beat and theme".

=== 1976–1977: Thunderbird ===
In 1976 released a self-financed debut album, Thunderbird on Eagle Records. It was produced by John Zulaikha (Buffalo), Brian Todd (their manager) and the band. Tony Catterall of The Canberra Times felt it was "not without its merits" as the group "are always at least exuberant", however "[it] suffers sadly from a lack of originality (Free, Status Quo and Black Sabbath influences abound), naivety in the lyrics and poor production". Australian musicologist, Ian McFarlane, noted the group "had a good deal of English-flavoured blues and hard rock buzzing around in their systems". In December they released a single, "Short Changed Again", which peaked at number 29 on the Sydney chart. As the single gained notice their distribution company foundered.

Late in 1976, Finch moved to Melbourne and supported a national tour by Supernaut.

In March 1977 Spencer left to replace Red Symons on guitar in Skyhooks. Tony Strain left the band at the same time. From April to July the band went through nine different members (including Sam Mallett, Skeeta Pereira, Gary Quince, and Graham Thompson) before Peter McFarlane and Orford were joined by Mark Evans (ex AC/DC) on bass guitar, Graham Kennedy on guitar and vocals, and Chris Jones on guitars. The band signed to CBS / Epic Records and issued the single, "One More Time" in October 1977 and they started recording material for their second album in the following month. Dave Hinds (ex-Marshall Brothers, Rabbit) replaced Chris Jones (who joined Feather) on guitar and vocals in December.

=== 1978–1980: Nothing to Hide and Contraband ===
The band adopted a more hard rock style, and the next single, "Where Were You?" reached number 14 in Melbourne and number 33 in Sydney in February 1978. The second studio album, Nothing to Hide was released in March 1978. It was produced by Peter Dawkins (Dragon) and provided a second single, the title track (May). The Canberra Times' Luis Feliu opined that they continued to provide "punchy rock and roll and a bit of R and B, the British way ... However, Finch's style has now become overworked to the point of being uninteresting". Finch signed with CBS's United States subsidiary label, Portrait Records.

Due to a Dutch band also called Finch, the Australian group were renamed as Contraband.

In October 1978, Portrait released Contraband's debut single, "That's Your Way" and Barry Cram (ex-Pantha, Avalanche, Russell Morris Band) replaced McFarlane on drums, who joined Swanee. In May 1979, Contraband was released, which was also produced by Dawkins. Some interest was generated in the US but the album was not successful in Australia. It provided two singles "Rainin' Again" (March 1979) and "Gimme Some Lovin'" (July) – which is a cover of The Spencer Davis Group 1966 single. Earlier Finch material was re-released under the Contraband name. However Portrait dropped them later in the year and they broke up.

=== Later years ===
Drummer Peter McFarlane died from a stroke on 7 December 2025, at the age of 73.

== Members ==
- Owen Orford – lead vocals (1972–1979)
- Bob Spencer – guitar (1973–1977)
- Tony Strain – bass, backing vocals (1973–1977)
- Peter McFarlane – drums, backing vocals (1973–1978; died 2025)
- Matt Hughes – organ (1973)
- Mark Evans – bass, backing vocals (1977–1979)
- David Hinds – guitar, backing vocals (1977–1979)
- Graham Kennedy – guitar, backing vocals (1977–1979)
- Sketa Pereira – guitar (1977–1978)
- Gary Quince – guitar (1977)
- Graham Thompson – bass (1977)
- Chris Jones – guitar (1977)
- Barry Cram – drums (1978–1979)
- Sam Mallet – guitar (1978)

Timeline

== Discography ==
=== Studio albums ===
List of albums, with selected details and chart positions
Title	Album details	Peak chart positions
Title	Album details	AUS
Drouyn (Peter Martin featuring Finch)	Released: October 1974; Format: LP; Label: Rainbow (KA 4000); Soundtrack to the film Drouyn	75
Thunderbird	Released: May 1976; Format: LP; Label: Eagle (ELF5001)	—
Nothing to Hide	Released: February 1978; Format: LP; Label: Epic (ELPS 3879); Note Reissued in 1978 by Portrait (PR 33006)	—
Contraband (as Contraband)	Released: May 1979; Format: LP, Cassette; Label: Portrait (PR 33015)	71

=== Singles ===
List of singles, with selected chart positions
Title	Year	Peak chart positions	Album
Title	Year	AUS	Album
Credited as Finch
"Out of Control"/And She Sings"	1974	—	Non-album single
"Stay"/"Roses"	1976	—	Thunderbird
"Short Changed Again"/"One Nighter"	1976	—	Non-album single
"One More Time"/"Mean Machine"	1977	—	Nothing to Hide
"Where Were You"/"Leave the Killing to You"	1978	25	Nothing to Hide
"Nothing to Hide"/"Foolin'"	1978	—	Nothing to Hide
Credited as Contraband
"That's Your Way"	1978	—	Non-album single
"Rainin' Again"/"Too Drunk to Know"	1979	—	Contraband
"Gimme Some Lovin'"/"C-61'"	1979	—	Contraband
