= Just Visiting (Cog album) =

Compilation album by Cog
- Released: 16 August 2008
- Genre: Progressive rock
- Label: Difrnt Music, MGM Distribution
- Producer: Cog

Cog chronology
Sharing Space (2008)	Just Visiting (2008)

Just Visiting is a compilation album by Australian progressive rock band Cog, released on 16 August 2008. The album is a compilation – re-release of the 2002 EPs Just Visiting Part One and Just Visiting Part Two as a full album – using the combined track listing but with the original long versions of "Bondi" and "Moshiach". In April 2003 both parts appeared on the ARIA Heavy Rock & Metal Singles Chart, with Part One peaking at No. 14 and Part Two reaching No. 4. Lucius Borich remastered the album at Studios 301.

== Track listing ==
All songs written, composed and performed by Cog.

No.	Title	Length
1.	"Bondi"	4:58
2.	"1010011010"	6:00
3.	"Pseudo"	5:18
4.	"Moo"	4:58
5.	"Stretch"	5:58
6.	"The Truth and Other Lies"	5:24
7.	"Holes"	4:55
8.	"Moshiach"	6:39
9.	"Paris, Texas"	6:26
10.	"Just Visiting"	8:19
Total length:		58:55

== Personnel ==
Cog

- Flynn Gower – lead vocals, guitar
- Lucius Borich – drums, vocals, samples
- Luke Gower – bass guitar, vocals
