= Owen Orford =

Australian singer

Owen Orford is an Australian booking agent and concert tour promoter. Orford transitioned from lead singer in Australian touring bands Finch, Contraband and Toys, to venue booker of Sydney venues The Astra Hotel, Bondi Beach and Sydney Cove Tavern from 1979–1982. He went on to promote tours for local and acts and has booked shows for more than 150 Australian artists.

== Early career ==
In 1972, he joined the hard rock group Finch. The band toured the country extensively and over the years released a number of hit singles and albums, including the critically acclaimed Thunderbird in 1976. The band signed with United States Label Portrait, changing their name to Contraband due to the existence of a Dutch band with the same name. After a run of line-up changes the band split up in 1979. The following year Orford went to work at the agency that had booked his band, Harbour Premier.

Orford developed a roster of acts including Hoodoo Gurus, Models, Hunters & Collectors, Icehouse, Moving Pictures, Heaven, Dynamic Hepnotics, The Radiators, The Cockroaches, Machinations, Kids in the Kitchen, Electric Pandas, The Stems, Boom Crash Opera, Jenny Morris, Big Pig, The Hummingbirds, Paul Kelly, Jimmy Barnes, The Screaming Tribesmen, Ups and Downs and Do-Re-Mi.

== TPA ==
In 1989 Orford left Harbour Premier to establish his own agency, Trading Post Agency (TPA). Their first act was Australian rock band Midnight Oil. Throughout the years the company, with Orford at the helm, TPA represented: Weddings Parties Anything, Tommy Emmanuel, Savage Garden, Men at Work, Killing Heidi, Grinspoon, Spiderbait, Falling Joys, Tall Tales and True, Clouds, Margaret Urlich, Directions in Groove, The Black Sorrows, The Screaming Jets, Kasey Chambers, Things of Stone and Wood, Grace Knight, InSurge, Wendy Matthews, The Living End, Primary, COG, Karnivool and Mammal, Shihad, Penny Flanagan, Weta and a number of international artists in Australia including; Adeva (USA), Hothouse Flowers (Ireland), Margaret Cho (USA) Crash Test Dummies (Canada), NoMeansNo (Canada), Jello Biafra Spoken Word (USA) and The Pursuit of Happiness (Canada). TPA booked world tours for; DIG, Karin Schaupp, and sold-out UK tours for Killing Heidi and Grinspoon.

From 2001–2003, Orford won 'Best Live Agent' at the Australian Live Music Awards three years in a row.

In July 1999, Orford was invited to be a part of the Commonwealth Government's Contemporary Music Touring Program sub-committee. The program allocated $1.05 million over three years to help develop viable touring opportunities for Australian musicians and increase audience access to Australian contemporary music.

In 2007, Orford managed the Across the Great Divide Tour that saw Powderfinger team up with Silverchair. The tour featured concerts in 26 towns across Australia and multiple shows in New Zealand, and sold out in Brisbane, Melbourne, Sydney. Adelaide, Wollongong, The Gold Coast, Newcastle and Perth.

In 2010, Silverchair and Grinspoon headlined 5 Groovin' The Moo one-day events, and propelled this regional touring festival to national touring festival. In 2017, NWA activated milestone event tours for: Spiderbait (Ivy & The Big Apples), Grinspoon (Guide To Better Living) and Tina Arena (Innocence to Understanding - 40th Anniversary Tour), and all became the highest selling national tours for each of these Artists to date.

== New World Artists ==
Orford is Executive Director at Australian booking agency, New World Artists. New World Artists is an independent booking agency.

New World Artist roster includes: Allday, Australian Rock Collective, Tina Arena, Grinspoon, Mallrat, The Potbelleez, Rockwiz Live, Silverchair, Slumberjack, Sarah Mcleod, Sneaky Sound System, Spiderbait, Darren Middleton, Urthboy and The Superjesus.

In 2018, Orford designed the 14 date Australian capital city ‘Chemical Hearts Tour 2019' for Grinspoon, in association with promoter TEG.

In 2018, Orford established the inaugural Spring Loaded Festival in June 2019, This success immediately enabled another two Spring Loaded Festivals for mid 2020 with headliner Grinspoon adding the Sydney edition, at Royal Randwick Lawns. Additional editions are planned in more States for when mass gatherings are allowed. NSW and QLD events are postponed to November 2020 or later due to Covid 19 restrictions.

In September 2019 Orford signed The Butterfly Effect for global representation and secured a return to Festival stages on Good Things in Melbourne, Sydney and hometown, Brisbane.

In November 2019, Orford moderated the Hypothetically Live Panel at Australian Music Week Conference. He also recommended Silverchair manager John Watson and Ken West (Big Day Out), to Bob Lefsetz as subjects to interview for his Podcast, The Lefsetz Letter.

In January 2020, Orford signed the 12 -18 piece funk collective, The Regime. Under Orford's representation The Regime played Big Gay Day 2020 and were booked for Byron Bay Bluesfest 2020.
