= Unith =

Australian and European-based artificial intelligence business

UNITH
- Unith logo, 2022
- Founded: 2009
- Headquarters: Australia
- Key people: Idan Schmorak - CEO
- Services: Conversational commerce
- Website: Unith.ai

UNITH (previously Crowd Mobile and Crowd Media), is an Australian and European-based artificial intelligence business, focusing on media technology around conversational commerce and its Digital Human platform which combines AI with machine learning based technology to generate digital avatars that appear visually as unique individuals.

The company is publicly listed on the Australian Securities Exchange and Frankfurt Stock Exchange.

== Current Operations ==
UNITH specialises in digital humans that look, sound and interact with users as if they were real people. The digital humans are powered by generative AI and respond to users in real time.

UNITH’s flagship product is its Digital Human Platform which will allow users to generate their own digital humans with unique visual representations and audio. Digital humans can then be deployed on a website where they can interact with website visitors, powered by conversational AI and capable of working 24/7 to answer questions and direct conversations towards a desired action.

In March 2024, UNITH successfully raised AU$4.6 million for the platform’s public launch as a self-service offering under a freemium model, scheduled for 2024.

UNITH’s artificial intelligence platform is further supported by its AI partners that specialise in different elements of media technology, including a 10% equity stake in Audiostack (previously named Aflorithmic Labs).

== History ==
UNITH was founded in 2009 by Domenic Carosa, under its former name Crowd Mobile which specialised in mobile Q&A services. In 2014, the company's financials showed that Crowd Mobile had processed more than 3.4 million questions. The total questions generated AU$9.8 million in revenue, which gave the company a gross income of AU$2.2 million for the financial year.

In 2015, Crowd Mobile diversified into the micro job market. Following the IPO their 2015 market capitalisation was set at AU$15 million, after originally being listed at 20c a share.

In December 2018, Crowd Mobile changed its name to Crowd Media to reflect its influence marketing business while retaining its corporate structure as a publicly listed company.

In August 2019, Crowd Media secured a AU $3.7 million investment from a European Consortium led by South African businessman Steven Schapera, a co-founder of BECCA Cosmetics. After expanding BECCA to more than 35 countries around the world, he exited when the business was sold to Estee Lauder for a reported US $200 million. Following the investment in Crowd Media, Schapera was appointed Chairman of the company.

In January 2021, Domenic Carosa resigned from his role as CEO of Crowd Media to concentrate on other blockchain-related ventures, which included Banxa, a cryptocurrency onboarding platform that he co-founded.

During Schapera’s tenure, Crowd Media underwent a transformational change to leverage its database of human-to-human conversations into artificial intelligence capable of engaging in human-to-computer conversations. These conversations would be powered by AI while interactions would be delivered by digital humans whose visual presentations were replicas of real humans with audio delivered by voice cloning.

In September 2021, Crowd Media appointed Idan Schmorak as CEO.

In October 2022, Crowd Media confirmed that it has been engaged by one of the Big Five tech companies to supply three digital avatar licences for the purpose of information delivery, where each will be able to interact with real people and be powered entirely by artificial intelligence. The digital humans will be able to converse in multiple languages, which can potentially save the client from hiring multiple employees to cover different regions.

In December 2022, Crowd Media changed its name to UNITH (ASX: UNT) while retaining its corporate structure as a publicly listed company.
