= Thoughtful Songs for Little People =

2020 studio album by Teeny Tiny Stevies

Studio album by Teeny Tiny Stevies
- Released: 7 August 2020
- Label: ABC Kids
- Producer: Bethany Stephen, Sibylla Stephen

Teeny Tiny Stevies chronology
Helpful Songs for Little People (2018)	Thoughtful Songs for Little People (2020)	How To Be Creative (2022)

Thoughtful Songs for Little People is the third studio album by Australian children's music group, Teeny Tiny Stevies. It was released on 7 August 2020.

At the ARIA Music Awards of 2020, the album won the ARIA Award for Best Children's Album.

At the AIR Awards of 2021, the album won Best Independent Children's Album or EP.

== Track listing ==
1. "Superpower" - 3:07
2. "Had You to Teach Me" - 3:07
3. "Happy Swimming" - 3:10
4. "Can't Wait to Be Home" - 3:54
5. "Plastic" - 2:34
6. "Respect My Pet" - 3:00
7. "Science" - 3:40
8. "Family Is a Team" - 3:48
9. "Abilities" - 3:17
10. "Things I Can Say" -3:28
11. "Good for Your Health" - 2:53
12. "Everything Comes to an End" - 3:12

== Charts ==
Chart performance for Thoughtful Songs for Little People
Chart (2020)	Peak position
Australian Albums (ARIA)	33

== Awards and nominations ==
Award	Year	Recipient(s) and nominee(s)	Category	Result	Ref.
AIR Awards	2021	Thoughtful Songs for Little People	Best Independent Children's Album or EP	Nominated	
ARIA Music Awards	2020	Thoughtful Songs for Little People	Best Children's Album	Won	
