= Faith in Plastics =

Australian indie pop/rock band

- Origin: Perth, Western Australia, Australia
- Genre: Indie pop
- Years active: 2002–2007
- Label: QStik Records/MGM Distribution
- Past members: Adam Livingston; Rhys Davies; Vaughan Davies; Dave Holley; Andrew Lodder
- Website: faithinplastics.com

Faith in Plastics were a four-piece indie pop/rock band from Perth, Western Australia formed in December 2002 and disbanded in 2007.

== History ==
=== Formation ===
Faith in Plastics was formed in December 2002 by Adam Livingston, Rhys Davies, Andrew Lodder, and Dave Holley. The band built a strong presence in the Perth live scene in their formative years before the release of their debut record, The Arctic Market.

=== The Arctic Market ===
Faith in Plastics released The Arctic Market in April 2006 to strong reviews. On the back of RTRFM (Perth)'s selection of the album as a Feature Record in early 2006, Faith in Plastics garnered national and local airplay on Triple J, RTRFM (Perth), FBi (Sydney), 4ZZZ (Brisbane), and 3RRR (Melbourne). They were quickly signed by QStik Records in 2006.

Since then, Faith in Plastics have become part of the Perth music establishment, supporting renowned Canadian indie outfit The Dears and high-profile Australian acts Eskimo Joe, New Rules for Boats, Snowman, The Panics, and Josh Pyke. In 2006, Faith in Plastics were nominated for WAM Song of the Year, and in 2007 they picked up two WAMi nominations for 'Best Indie Pop Act' and 'Most Promising Newcomer'. In addition, the band was one of the drawcards at the prestigious Perth International Arts Festival in 2007 and recently finished touring with The Panda Band. Faith in Plastics are presently recording their next record, as yet untitled, with producer Steve Bond.

The band received a Contemporary Music Grant from ArtsWA to mix, master, press and launch their second EP.

=== Line-up changes ===
Bassist Andrew Lodder left the band in September 2006 after being awarded a Rhodes Scholarship to Oxford University. Vaughan Davies, brother of guitarist Rhys Davies, took over bass duties.

=== Dissolution ===
Faith in Plastics was disbanded in mid-December 2007 due to irreconcilable differences between frontman Adam Livingston and lead guitarist Rhys Davies. As of 19 December 2007, the proposed debut album project, though very near to completion, was aborted with primary songwriter Livingston planning to pursue other avenues for exposure of his music.

Faith in Plastics have since sorted out their differences and are currently working on finishing their debut album.

=== Subsequent projects ===
As of 2009, Rhys Davies plays guitar in the band Split Seconds.

As of 2009, Adam Livingston and Vaughan Davies play in the band Emperors.

== Members ==
- Adam Livingston (2002–2007) – vocals, guitar
- Rhys Davies (2002–2007) – guitar, keyboard, backing vocals
- Vaughan Davies (2006–2007) – bass guitar
- Dave Holley (2002–2007) – drums
- Andrew Lodder (2002–2006) – bass guitar

== Discography ==
=== Arctic Market ===
Arctic Market is the debut EP from Faith in Plastics. It was released in April 2006 by QStik Records through MGM Distribution.

==== Track listing ====
1. "Hate to Say It"
2. "Fluoro Light Concerto"
3. "Little Miss Guided"
4. "Driving via Streetlight"
5. "Place in the Sky"
6. "The Wrong Impressionists"
