= Cog (band) =

Australian progressive rock band

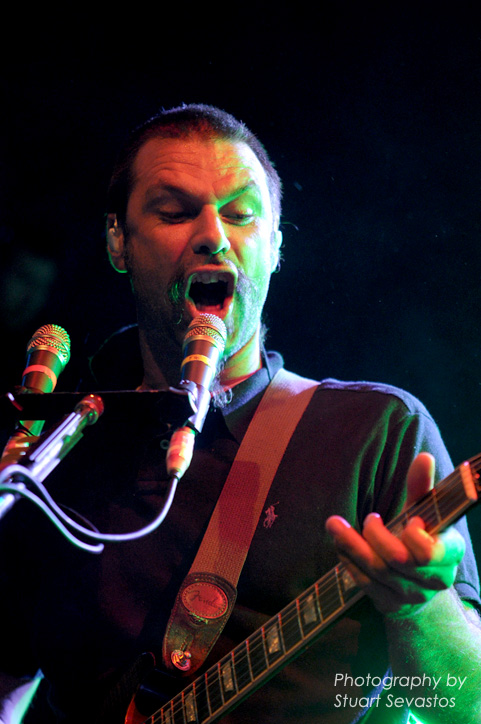
- Flynn Gower performing at the Metropolis Fremantle in 2009

Background information
- Origin: Sydney, New South Wales, Australia
- Genres: Alternative rock; progressive rock; math rock; alternative metal
- Years active: 1998–2010, 2016–present
- Labels: Difrnt Music, National Recorder, Little Samurai, MGM Distribution
- Members: Flynn Gower; Lucius Borich; Luke Gower
- Website: cog.com.au

Cog are an Australian rock band that formed in 1998. Their debut album, The New Normal, was nominated for Triple J's 2005 J Award. The band's music is influenced by Tool, Isis, Nina Simone, Bob Marley, Leftfield, Deftones and Helmet.

== History ==
=== Pre-1998 ===
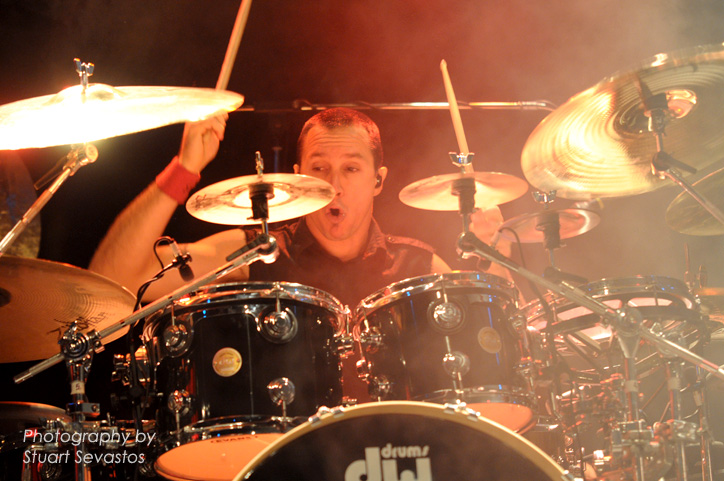
Lucius Borich performing at the Metropolis Fremantle in 2009

Flynn Gower and Lucius Borich (the son of renowned Australian blues guitarist Kevin Borich) were friends at their Bondi high school in the 1980s. Borich being a drummer, and Flynn being a guitarist, they would occasionally jam. As their school careers finished, Borich formed the band Juice while Flynn formed the five-piece metal band The Hanging Tree, popular in the Sydney live circuit. In 1995, after the release of Juice's debut album, Borich left the band and joined The Hanging Tree. Shortly after the release of their debut, Borich left the band and the country, travelling to the United States to follow a career of session drumming. There Borich did session drumming for a large range of genres, writing songs on his guitar all the while. Flynn, in Sydney, wanted to form a band and contacted Lucius, eventually resulting in the formation of Cog.

=== Formation and early releases (1998–2003) ===
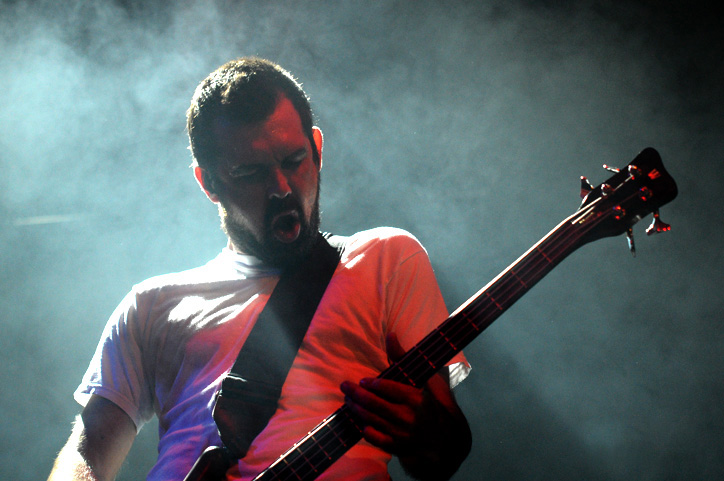
Luke Gower performing at the Metropolis Fremantle in 2009

Initially, the band was to form in the United States, but Borich chose to travel home. He'd find a disappointed Flynn, who had already sold all his gear in preparation for the move. The drum, bass, and guitar parts for what would become the Just Visiting EPs were recorded shortly after, in 1998, with Borich assuming bass duties. The vocals would be recorded two years later. To fill out the bass in live shows, Flynn recruited his brother Luke, formerly of the Sydney band Tax. After they formed this legitimate lineup, they toured aggressively, clocking up thousands of kilometres of weekly driving between Sydney and Melbourne.

Their first residency, at the Forrest Inn Hotel in the Sydney suburbs, was without a vocalist. They encouraged people to send them demos for the vocal job, but the band were so unimpressed with the demos that Flynn trained his voice to fill the vacancy. Their breakthrough gig was a Wednesday headlining slot at Excelsior Hotel in Surry Hills, where they packed out the club consistently for 4 months. They were recognised with a nomination for "best emerging live band in NSW" at the Australian Live Music Awards. In 2001, the band signed with underground label Little Samurai Records and prepared to release the Just Visiting Part One and Just Visiting Part Two EPs.

The two EPs, despite the slight differences in style between them, were written and recorded at the same time. The band chose not to release the studio session as a full album so they would not lose their debut album virginity, and would get twice the publicity. They grabbed a breakthrough gig just before the release of Just Visiting Part One, supporting System of a Down at the Hordern Pavilion. Just Visiting Part One was released in February 2002 and was still consistently appearing in the ARIA Top 20 Heavy Rock/Metal singles/EPs chart over 2 years after its release. In July, the song "Bondi" was added to Andrew Haug's Triple J 3 Hours of Power Compilation.

Just Visiting Part Two was released in October that same year and was also still appearing in the ARIA Top 20 Heavy Rock/Metal singles/EPs charts after two years. That year, Cog also won "best emerging live band in NSW" at the Australian Live Music Awards. After an extensive tour supporting the two EPs, including a slot at the Big Day Out in 2003, Cog recorded a cover of "Open Up", a single released in 1993 by Leftfield featuring John Lydon. This song had been a live favourite for the previous year.

Shortly afterwards, Cog continued to write and demo for their debut album.

=== The New Normal (2004–2006) ===
While the vast majority of the material for The New Normal had already been demoed by late 2003, with some songs first performed live as far back as May 2002, Cog did not have the kind of financial backing needed to record their album as they desired. However, after months of limbo, Cog were signed by Aloha Management (Shihad, Killing Heidi) and subsequently, former Universal Music Australia head Paul Krige's label Difrnt Music.

During the later months of 2004, Cog recorded their debut album, The New Normal, in the small logging town of Weed, California with producer Sylvia Massy (System of a Down and Tool). Shortly afterwards, the band performed a short tour of the east coast and played at the inaugural Pyramid Rock Festival. The album was released in Australia in April 2005, to a debut of No. 19 in the ARIA Charts, and a No. 1 debut in the Australian Independent Recordings (AIR) album charts. The New Normal was one of the nominees for the 2005 Triple J J Award.

In support of the album, the band headlined a full Australian tour in April and May with supports from Karnivool and In the Grey. During July they supported Shihad on a tour of New Zealand. During October they toured the country with supports from The Fumes, Grand Fatal, and Jakob. They finished the year with appearances at Homebake, the Pyramid Rock Festival, and the Big Day Out. Cog supported Australian rock group Grinspoon at the Adelaide race event Clipsal 500 and appeared at the Rock-It Festival in Perth on 19 March with Silverchair, Grinspoon, and Shihad amongst others. During March and April, the band toured the country in support of the final radio single from The New Normal, "Resonate".

=== Sharing Space (2007–2010) ===
Cog, from June 2006 onwards, planned to spend a portion of the year in the United States, promoting a release of The New Normal there through extensive touring. However, this release was pushed back to 2007.

On 9 January, Cog began to record and write tracks for their second album, entitled Sharing Space, at Weed, California, once again with Sylvia Massy producing. They took a break from recording in June, bouncing back to Australia for the Boomerang Tour for a number of shows. The short tour run included Fremantle, Brisbane, Melbourne and Sydney, where several new songs were premiered, including "Bird of Feather" (then titled "Double Triple") and "What If". Cog toured Australia more extensively in November 2007, in support of "What If?", the first single from the new album due April 2008. This tour marked Cog's first trip to North Queensland.

On 3 November, Cog released "What If", the first single from Sharing Space with the title track to the album as a b-side. On 12 November, this song debuted at No. 21 on the physical ARIA singles chart, the only new entry debuting higher being Alicia Keys. Sharing Space was released on 12 April 2008. In February, the band announced that they will be touring around Australia in support of Sharing Space in May and June. They performed shows around the country with two New Zealand bands, Kora and Jakob, as well as local Melbourne prog-rock band Sleep Parade and Brisbane's Melodyssey. Despite the conflict and difficulty of the recording process of Sharing Space, Borich commented on the process saying "You can’t really put a timeframe on creating art...sometimes you have to struggle through in order to come up with the goods musically. Otherwise it’s not going to have any validity or longevity".

In July 2008, Cog performed in England for the first time at Shepherd's Bush Empire and GuilFest with New Zealand band Shihad. They also expressed interest in releasing Sharing Space in Europe.

In 2008, the band had the opportunity to re-release their 2002 EPs Just Visiting Part One and Just Visiting Part Two as a full album; Just Visiting, with the intended track listing and the never previously heard original (long) version of Bondi. Lucius Borich spent time at Studios 301 mastering the album so the recordings sounded their best.

In June and July 2009, the band toured Australia with support from British-based band Oceansize. The tour was the band's most successful headlining tour to date. The band at the 2009 Big Day Out, performing at all the Australian dates.

In 2010, the band released The Sound of Three: 12 Years With You, a CD/DVD produced by Lucius Borich. Containing a recording from the band's "Between Oceans" tour, and a documentary on this history of the band (on the DVD only). The band toured the album in early June; Lucius Borich had hinted in several interviews that these might have been the last shows Cog would play as a band.

Cog played what many had believed to be their last show at The Tivoli in Brisbane on Saturday 12 June 2010, thanking their various crew members one by one between songs. The band finished with "No Other Way", the opening track from their second album, Sharing Space. However, the band played four more shows - one at the Full Noise Festival in Townsville, one at a Sydney nightclub, and two smaller shows in the outer Melbourne suburbs of Frankston and Ferntree Gully. Their Sydney show on 22 December 2010 was Cog's last show until they reform six years later.

=== Hiatus (2011–2016) ===
Lucius Borich soon joined Floating Me, a band featuring ex-members of Scary Mother and Jon Stockman of Karnivool. Floating Me released their debut self-titled album in 2011. Flynn and Luke Gower went on to form The Occupants in 2012. Their first single, "I've Been Thinking", was released in April 2013. It was followed by an EP in 2014.

=== Reunion and The Middle (2016–present) ===
In late January 2016, the official Cog Facebook page was updated for the first time in nearly three years with new photos. In the weeks that followed, the band put up entire photo albums of previously unseen photos taken on tours from over the years. This subsequently lead to speculation regarding the band getting back together. The following month, it was confirmed that Cog would reunite for a run of headlining shows in July 2016.

Throughout 2017, Cog have been working on new material, posting regular updates to the band's Instagram account of the album's progress.

The band's single "The Middle" was released in 2018, making it their first new music in ten years. They have since released two more singles titled "Altered States" and "Drawn Together", the latter being the focus of the upcoming 2019 Drawn Together Tour.

=== Controversy ===
In 2021, Cog stirred controversy when frontman Flynn Gower shared posts of anti-vaccination rhetoric and conspiracies surrounding COVID-19 on social media, while also publicly voicing his support for the anti-lockdown protests in New South Wales.

== Discography ==
=== Studio albums ===
List of albums, with selected chart positions
Title	Album details	Peak chart positions	Certification
Title	Album details	AUS	Certification
The New Normal	Released: April 2005; Label: Difrnt Music	19	
Sharing Space	Released: April 2008; Label: Difrnt Music	2	ARIA: Gold

=== Compilations ===
List of albums, with selected chart positions
Title	Album details	Peak chart positions
Title	Album details	AUS
Just Visiting	Released: 2008; Label: Difrnt Music	

=== EPs ===
List of EPs, with selected chart positions
Title	EP details	Peak chart positions
Title	EP details	AUS
Pseudo	Released: 2000	-
Just Visiting Part One	Released: 2002; Label: (Little Samurai/MGM Distribution)	-
Just Visiting Part Two	Released: October 2002; Label: (Little Samurai/MGM Distribution)	90

=== Singles ===
List of singles, with selected chart positions
Year	Title	Peak chart positions
Year	Title	AUS
2003	"Open Up"	81
2005	"Run"	75
2006	"Resonate"	-
2006	"Real Life"	-
2007	"What If"	45
2008	"Bird of Feather"	72
2018	"The Middle"	-
2018	"Altered States"	-
2019	"Drawn Together"	-
2025	"Walk the Line"	-

=== Video albums ===
List of Video albums, with selected chart positions
Title	Album details	Peak chart positions
Title	Album details	AUS DVD Chart
The Sound of Three: 12 Years with You	Released: May 2010	1

== Awards ==
=== J Award ===
The J Awards are an annual series of Australian music awards that were established by the Australian Broadcasting Corporation's youth-focused radio station Triple J. They commenced in 2005.

Year	Nominee / work	Award	Result
2005	The New Normal	Australian Album of the Year	Nominated
2008	Sharing Space	Australian Album of the Year	Nominated
