= Figgkidd =

- Born: Lee Monro
- Genre: Hip hop
- Occupation: Rapper
- Label: Unda K9

Figgkidd is an Australian rapper from Bankstown, New South Wales. He is often compared to Eminem. He won best new talent at the 2006 Urban Music Awards. He no longer performs under this moniker and now releases music under his birth name.

== Discography ==
=== Albums ===
List of albums, with selected details
| Title | Details |
|---|---|
| What Is Figgkidd | Released: 2004; Format: CD; Label: Unda K9 Records (5189782000) |
| This Is Figgkidd | Released: 2005; Format: CD+DVD; Label: Unda K9 Records (5189786000) |
| Figgkidd | Released: 2007; Format: CD; Label: Unda K9 Records (UK9007CD) |

=== Singles ===
List of singles, with selected chart positions
| Title | Year | Peak chart positions | Album |
| Title | Year | AUS | Album |
|---|---|---|---|
| "I Gotta Know" (featuring Tech N9ne and Redfoo) | 2004 | 50 | What Is Figgkidd |
| "My Oh My" | 2005 | 71 | What Is Figgkidd |
| "Fairytale Master" | 2005 | — | What Is Figgkidd |
| "Feel Good" | 2007 | 65 | Figgkidd |
