= Destra Corporation =

Destra Corporation Limited
- Traded as: ASX: DES
- Industry: Digital media
- Founded: 1993; As a public company: 2000
- Defunct: 13 November 2008
- Fate: Entered administration in 2008
- Headquarters: Melbourne, Australia
- Key people: Domenic Carosa (founder)

Destra Corporation Limited, previously known as Sprint Corporation and Ehyou, was an independent Australian media and entertainment company based in Richmond, Victoria founded by Domenic Carosa. Destra grew through a series of acquisitions and was briefly one of the largest online music distributors in Australia, while also offering hosting and domain registry. Its shareholders included Prime Media, whose stake represented 44% at April 2008.

Following the collapse of Opes Prime in 2007, Destra lost $76.9 million between 2007 and early 2008. The company was split into a number of divisions before its subsidiaries were sold. It became defunct in November 2008.

== History ==
Domenic Carosa and Anna Carosa founded Destra Corporation in 1993. The Carosas were teenagers when they conceived the concept, which they originally called Sprint. Initially, the company owned entertainment websites in Australia and formed Ozhosting.com in 1995 to provide hosting to small businesses. Sprint Corporation purchased a number of smaller Australian-based hosting companies over the next couple of years to increase its market share in the hosting market. This included BlueFire and GlobalHost, which operated under the OzHosting.com brand.

In 2000, Sprint was rebranded as Ehyou to expand into other online fields besides hosting. This included the purchase of mp3.com.au, an online music and digital downloads site. Over the next couple of years, Destra expanded its hosting offerings geographically through acquisitions of Cyberhost, lasiaworks, and Ocean Internet's hosting division. Destra also acquired Webtrader in January 2001 to further diversify its services. The company was then integrated under its OzHosting subsidiary, making the hosting brand the second largest retail hosting company in Australia. During 2002, Destra continued to acquire hosting companies, including Enet21 and SuperHosting, and a 60% controlling interest in TPP Internet, which was one of Australia's largest domain name registrars at the time.

In 2004, the OzHosting brand was shelved, and OzHosting and Techex merged to form Destra. The same year, Destra won the PowerTel Partner of the Year award. Within a year, the company reached a partnership agreement with Yahoo! to create a new suite of services that would be integrated into its subsidiary, OzHosting. In 2005, Destra reported revenue of over $15 million, up 73% from the previous year, with revenues of $15.739 million, up 73 percent.

In 2006, Destra was the largest digital music provider in Australia, with more than 1.3 million tracks in its online music catalogue. At the time, the company was developing advertising revenue streams across its websites.

Destra was greatly affected by the collapse of Opes Prime in 2008. In 2007–2008, Destra lost $76.9 million, having made 13 acquisitions in the previous three years. In November 2008, Destra's divisions were sold in administration to companies including Fremantle Media; Central Station Records; Brand New Media; Eddie MacGuire's Visual Entertainment Group; and Dominet Digital.
