= Juice (Australian band) =

Australian funk metal band (1991–1996)

- Origin: Sydney, New South Wales, Australia
- Genre: Funk metal
- Years active: 1991–1996
- Label: Polydor
- Past members: see Band members below

Juice were an Australian funk metal band formed in 1991 by brothers Amarnath and Krishna Jones both on guitar and vocals, Lucius Borich on drums; and David Kyle on bass guitar. They released their debut album, Wine of Life, in 1994 which peaked in the top 50 on the ARIA Albums Chart. At the ARIA Music Awards of 1994, their debut extended play, Movin' On, was nominated for ARIA Award for Best Independent Release.

== History ==
=== 1991–1996: Juice ===
Juice formed in 1991 in Sydney as a hard rock funk band by Amarnath and his brother Krishna Jones both on guitars and vocals; Lucius Borich on drums, and David Kyle on bass guitar. According to Australian rock music historian, Ian McFarlane, they "played a fiery fusion of hard funk, aggressive rock, psychedelia and soul (somewhere between Funkadelic, Led Zeppelin, Jimi Hendrix and the 'stoned soul picnic' stylings of Sly and the Family Stone). Juice was one of a number of young bands at that time exploring diverse musical avenues on the traditional Australian pub-rock scene: d.i.g.'s acid jazz, Swoop's soulful funk grooves, Def FX's techno-metal, Skunkhour's funk'n'rap and Caligula's techno-pop". Phil Jones (aka Shiva Shankar Jones), father of Amarnath and Krishna, is a musician, who worked with 1960s group The Unknown Blues. In 1969 he relocated to the United Kingdom to join progressive rock band, Quintessence. Borich is a son of New Zealand-born Australian guitarist Kevin Borich.

During 1993 Juice supported Hoodoo Gurus and INXS; in April they released their first extended play, Movin' On. At the ARIA Music Awards of 1994 it was nominated for Best Independent Release. In April 1994 the group's debut studio album, Wine of Life, was released on Polydor Records. It provided the singles "Skyhigh" in April and "Paper World" in November that same year. Kyle left before the album had appeared and was replaced on bass guitar by Ben Rosen. In early 1995 Borich left to form a heavy stoner rock band, The Hanging Tree. Borich was replaced by Chris Simms on drums. They supported tours by Radiohead and The Tea Party. In June 1995 Juice released a single, "Never Enough", followed by another EP, Fractured in September. Simon Cox replaced Simms on drums, but by early 1996 Juice had disbanded.

=== 1998–present: Post Juice music careers ===
After disbandment various former members of Juice continued their music careers. In 1998, Lucius Borich, along with Flynn Gower from The Hanging Tree formed a progressive rock group, Cog. In 1999, Amarnath and Krishna Jones created a new acoustic blues-rock band, Juggernaut, which issued three EPs, Million Miles from Home (1999), Better Than Everyone (2000) and Head in the Clouds (September 2004); and a studio album, Burn. Krishna co-wrote the screenplay of a 2001 short film, The Host, with its director and editor, Nick Tomnay. In 2002, Krishna produced recordings by nu-metal band Beacon, the group included Emelyn Walters from The Hanging Tree. Juggernaut's track, "Bubbleman", received an honourable mention in the Rock category at the 2004 International Songwriting Competition for its songwriters, Amarnath and Krishna. Krishna issued his debut solo album, Razor's Edge, in 2007. Ben Rosen remixed works by Marilyn Manson, Unwritten Law, Nikka Costa, Grinspoon, 8mm and also started his own audio company, The Gunnery, in Singapore.

On 29 May 2010 the original four members of Juice (Krishna and Amarnath Jones, Lucius Borich and David Kyle) reunited for a gig at The Beach Road Hotel to perform together for the first time since Dave Kyle departed the band in 1994. The success of that reunion gig inspired the band to reform and write a new album which was titled "Signs" and was released in 2019.

== Band members ==
- Krishna Jones – lead vocals, guitar (1991–2018)
- Amarnath Jones – guitar, vocals (1991–2018)
- Lucius Borich – drums (1991–2018)
- David Kyle – bass guitar (1991–1994, 2010, 2018)
- Ben Rosen – bass guitar (1995–1996)
- Simon Cox – drums (1996)

== Discography ==
=== Studio albums ===
List of albums, with Australian chart positions
Title	Album details	Peak chart positions
Title	Album details	AUS
Wine of Life	Released: April 1994; Label: Polydor (5218312); Format: CD	42
Fractured	Released: September 1995; Label: Phantom (PHCD-55); Format: CD	—
Signs	Released: 2017; Label: juice-rock; Format: CD, digital	—

=== Extended plays ===
List of EPs, with selected details
Title	EP details
Movin' On	Released: 1993; Label: MDS (DRJ001); Format: CD

=== Singles ===
List of singles, with selected chart positions
Title	Year	Peak chart positions	Album
Title	Year	AUS	Album
"Don't Give It Up"	1993	89	Wine of Life
"Skyhigh" / "Own Thing"	1994	—	Wine of Life
"Paper World"	1994	—	Wine of Life
"Lonely"	1994	—	Wine of Life

== Awards and nominations ==
=== ARIA Music Awards ===
The ARIA Music Awards are a set of annual ceremonies presented by Australian Recording Industry Association (ARIA), which recognise excellence, innovation, and achievement across all genres of the music of Australia. They commenced in 1987.

Year	Nominee / work	Award	Result	Ref.
1994	Movin' On	Best Independent Release	Nominated	
