= Opes Prime =

Defunct Australian securities company

Opes Prime Group Limited
- Industry: Financial services
- Founded: 2003
- Founder: Laurie Emini; Julian Smith
- Defunct: 28 March 2008
- Fate: Receivership
- Headquarters: Australia
- Area served: Australia; Singapore; New Zealand
- Services: Securities lending Stockbroking

Opes Prime Group Limited was an Australian securities lending and stockbroking firm which suffered a dramatic collapse in 2008.

== Overview ==
The company was founded in 2003 by Laurie Emini and Julian Smith. Emini, an Albanian emigrant to Australia, had worked for the Australia & New Zealand Banking Group (ANZ) until he was retrenched in 1997, and began share trading from his home. Smith, a British national, had emigrated to Australia in 1993, and ran the securities and investments division of the stock brokerage firm Ord Minnett. By 2008, the company had offices in Melbourne, Sydney and Singapore and employed about 80 people.

The company's downfall was revealed on 28 March 2008 when the Australian Securities & Investments Commission (ASIC) announced it was launching an investigation into Opes Prime Stockbroking, and that the company had gone into receivership the previous day, with Deloitte Touche Tohmatsu appointed as receivers by the ANZ Bank immediately after the company had appointed Ferrier Hodgson as administrators. Opes Prime's secured debt was believed to be over A$1 billion, with its major secured creditors including the ANZ Bank (owed around $650 million), and Merrill Lynch.

Melbourne underworld figure Mick Gatto made headlines when he travelled to Singapore on behalf of an anonymous group of investors in an attempt to retrieve their money. Gatto however returned to Melbourne saying that the Singapore Directors and staff were hardly to blame but were rather "victims".

On 15 October 2008, the Opes Prime creditors voted to place the companies of the group into liquidation with the administrator Ferrier Hodgson being appointed as liquidator. Ferrier Hodgson then tenaciously pursued ANZ Bank and Merrill Lynch for restitution in relation to their dealings with the companies immediately prior to and in receivership. This effort was supported by ASIC. The actions of ASIC and Ferrier Hodgson resulted in a settlement which included the payment of compensation and enforceable undertakings by ANZ Bank.

These settlements allowed the liquidators to propose a scheme of arrangement which was approved by the court on 4 August 2009. The scheme of arrangement has allowed the liquidators to repay creditors some 37c in the dollar of the sums they were owed, but prevents the creditors from taking any further actions against ANZ Bank.

== Criminal charges ==
Laurie Emini, Julian Smith and a third director, Anthony Blumberg, were each charged with four offences in late 2009 in relation to the collapse of the group. In bringing these charges ASIC alleged that shortly before Opes Prime collapsed, the directors signed financial documentation with ANZ Bank to obtain a term loan for Opes Prime Stockbroking Limited (OPSL) and Opes Prime Group Limited (OPGL) and pledged the companies' assets as security to meet the obligations of a third company, Leveraged Capital Pty Ltd. ASIC alleged that in doing so, the directors were intentionally dishonest and failed to exercise their powers and discharge their duties in good faith in the best interests of OPGL and OPSL. It was further alleged that Messrs Emini, Smith and Blumberg dishonestly used their position as directors of OPGL and OPSL with the intention of directly or indirectly gaining an advantage for themselves or for someone else.

Leveraged Capital Pty Ltd was a company owned by Emini and Smith. It was placed into administration and receivership at the same time as the Opes Prime companies.

A third company at the centre of the saga, Hawkswood Pty Ltd, was owned equally by Emini, Smith and Blumberg. It was ostensibly involved in venture capital financing. It was also placed into administration and receivership at the same time as the Opes Prime companies.

On 28 May 2010 ASIC announced that a further 22 charges had been laid against Laurie Emini for breaching his duties as a director of Opes Prime Stockbroking Ltd and Leveraged Capital Pty Ltd. ASIC alleged that on a number of occasions between July 2006 and February 2008, Emini caused the false recording of securities in the records of OPSL and Leveraged Capital so that securities were recorded as being held by more than one client at the same time. The result of this false recording was that the records of OPSL and Leveraged Capital were not a true reflection of the state of those companies' securities holdings and consequently, their respective financial positions. The value of these securities was in excess of $50 million. ASIC further alleged that in causing the false recordings to be made, Emini was intentionally dishonest and failed to exercise and discharge his duties in good faith in the best interests of OPSL and Leveraged Capital. Ten of the charges brought by ASIC allege that Emini used his position with Opes "dishonestly with the intention of directly gaining an advantage for yourself or someone else".

There was a significant delay in bringing the three accused to trial because of the length of time prosecutors believed that a committal hearing would require - some three to four weeks. The committal hearing was set for 28 February 2011, but some further developments in the case occurred on 2 February 2011. On that day, Emini was declared bankrupt owing some $6.8 million to Opes Prime as well as sizeable sums to others including his lawyers. At the same time, Smith was granted legal aid with his defence to be funded by taxpayers.

== Committal proceedings ==
As it turned out, the long committal hearing did not eventuate. On the first day of the hearing, Emini indicated that he would not contest the committal and was therefore committed to stand trial on 21 March 2011. His counsel, Peter Fitzgerald also told the court, "My client's pleading not guilty, but as indicated ... there will be a plea to an appropriately worded indictment". Blumberg also did not proceed to committal. He sought an adjournment which was granted. Outside court Blumberg's solicitor, Graeme Efron, said his client was "in discussions with the Crown" but "no inference can be drawn that my client will plead guilty".

The committal hearing for Smith proceeded after a delay of a week. In presenting its case, the prosecution made the following allegations:

- The largest single client of failed stock lender Opes Prime was given special treatment and allowed to continue trading despite a $116 million shortfall in his accounts.
- Emini tried to hide the $116 million shortfall in the accounts of Sydney lawyer-turned-investor Chris Murphy. He allegedly tried to cover up the shortfalls by manipulating stock to avoid margin calls being made on Murphy and other key clients. To this end, the amount of stock available to Opes Prime and Leveraged Capital, was allegedly double-counted at least 13 times.
- Smith had hidden the true nature of the "Murphy problem" from the ANZ bank. "He was aware Murphy could not repay and it's alleged he gave the ANZ bank the impression that Murphy could repay," Mark Gibson, the prosecuting counsel, said. "The opposite was the state of affairs and it's alleged he knew very well about that."
- Smith also allegedly hid from the bank the true financial position of Opes Prime and Leveraged Capital. He applied for and was given a $95 million loan from ANZ but it was allegedly insufficient to solve the $300 million problem caused by shortfalls in its key accounts.

Mr Gibson indicated that Smith had informed the ANZ Bank that Opes Prime accounts had been "manipulated", but alleged that he did not disclose the true nature of the "Murphy" problem. Gibson said that in addition to failing to tell ANZ that Murphy owed Opes Prime as much as $116 million, Smith also concealed problems, including a $102 million shortfall in accounts held by Riqueza Holdings, a company controlled by Emini, Smith and Blumberg.

On the same day, the court also heard from the chief operating officer of Opes Prime who indicated that Smith gave an "aggressive" response when confronted with the Murphy issue at Opes Prime's Melbourne office in February 2008. Smith is further alleged to have said, "I am telling you the position is covered and there are no problems with it. Put a stop to this shit now and get on with your job."

The following day, 8 March 2011, Opes Prime's erstwhile Chief Financial Officer made further revelations. He indicated that, "It is now my belief that the arrangement entered into with the ANZ provided absolutely no benefit at all to Opes Prime and was to the total detriment of its clients, creditors and employees." He also recounted that he had been present when Smith had received the phone call from ANZ Bank. "Smith was so relieved at the news he broke down sobbing," he said.

On 9 March 2011, evidence presented indicated that $95 million worth of shares belonging to Norm Seckold were being used to "plug a hole" in Chris Murphy's accounts and Seckold had requested the return of his shares. A lawyer who had advised Opes Prime indicated that the shortfall in the Murphy accounts was some $196 million rather than the $116 million that had previously been mentioned. He also indicated that at that stage he believed removing Mr. Seckold's shares from Opes Prime could leave the company insolvent. After ANZ Bank was informed of the problem it presented a plan to the Opes Prime directors which gave Opes Prime $95 million in order to release the shares of Seckold, in return for a charge over Opes Prime assets. The interesting background to this proposal was that Seckold was not in fact a client of Opes Prime. He was actually a client of Leveraged Capital and it was from that company that he had sought a return of his securities and not from Opes Prime.

On 10 March, the court heard from senior ANZ Bank executive Ben Steinberg. He indicated that he had been informed about a $100 million "hole", but despite regarding the matter as extremely serious, he felt it could be rectified because Murphy was "able to obtain assistance from the Packers in receiving guarantees" as had been revealed in earlier evidence. He also indicated that on the day following the execution of the agreement, Blumberg had called him in some distress to indicate that the shortfall was actually closer to $200 million than $100 million. The court was also told that the agreement included a change to the securities lending agreement between ANZ Bank and Opes Prime. This change applied to the "close out" provisions of the securities lending agreement that would apply in the event of a default. The standard provisions would have seen all shareholdings valued at market prices with the party with the higher value paying the other party the difference. This would have resulted in ANZ Bank owing Opes Prime the margins between their holdings of shares and the value of loans drawn by Opes Prime and its clients. Steinberg indicated that this payment would have been some $240 million. ANZ Bank would have then been left to dispose of the mostly small capitalisation securities on the market for what would likely have been a lower value. The provisions were instead changed to value the shares at the price which could be obtained for them on the market. The risk of loss on disposal was thereby transferred to Opes Prime and its clients.

This evidence reflects comments by Blumberg reported in The Australian of 5 June 2008. In this article, Blumberg stated, "I understood that the bank wanted to replace the existing close-out arrangements, under which the securities pool held by the bank would be valued according to more judgmental fair value. I was well aware that this variation might cause significant detriment to the companies, in light of the make-up of the securities pool held by ANZ, and therefore we resisted that change during late February and early March.''

Blumberg also commented on the discussions with ANZ Bank on Easter Friday to which Steinberg referred. Blumberg said he believed money was to be lent to Leveraged Capital and that when he woke up on Good Friday he "had a moment of clarity". "I realised there was no way that $95 million from ANZ would fix the problems Opes was facing." Blumberg said he phoned Steinberg around 10 am. He couldn't remember the exact words used, but believed that they had conversation to the following effect, "In no way are you going to drop $95 million into Opes on Tuesday morning. The problem is much bigger than $95 million. There are double stock counting issues and in addition to the $95 million call there is a $116 million hole. There is no way I am signing a guarantee when the $95 million won't fix a problem. The problem would be $200 million or more and the company may be insolvent.'' To which Steinberg apparently said, "You can't back out, it's all signed. We have agreed to advance the money so we cannot stop the process." From the information emerging at the trial, it would appear that this assessment of the problem was accurate. Including the $95m "call" by Seckold for the return of his securities by Leveraged Capital, there would appear to have been a total deficiency of $196m.

The Australian article also revealed that Blumberg eventually withdrew his objections and allegations of potential fraud in exchange for ANZ Bank releasing him from a personal guarantee which they had required him to provide as part of the agreement.

On 11 March the court heard testimony from Opes Prime's erstwhile head of operations. She had carried out a number of transactions at Emini's behest to bolster the margin positions of a number of accounts including Riqueza, those of Chris Murphy and also others. She indicated that the first such transaction occurred on 27 June 2006 when Emini had used $17.4 million worth of Norm Seckold's shares (from Emini's and Smith's company Leveraged Capital) to support the margin position of Riqueza. By early March 2008 this approach saw $95 million of Norm Seckold's holding of Coeur d'Alene Mines being held as collateral by Opes Prime for borrowings by Riqueza and accounts associated with Riqueza. This would suggest that Emini had transferred shares owned by Leveraged Capital to Riqueza to be lodged with Opes Prime as collateral for Riqueza's borrowings. Opes Prime had in turn lodged these shares with ANZ Bank to support its borrowing position. The problem with this transaction was that although the shares were owned by Leveraged Capital, they were in reality collateral for Norm Seckold's borrowings rather than free assets of Leveraged Capital.

At the conclusion of proceedings Smith was committed to stand trial in the supreme court on 21 March 2011.

Blumberg had also returned to court on 11 March. He pleaded not guilty and indicated that he was willing to proceed directly to trial. He was duly also committed to stand trial in the supreme court on 21 March 2011.

Summary

The questioning of the various witnesses regarding their statements indicates the following:

- Whilst directors of Opes Prime, Smith and Emini owned and operated Leveraged Capital (ABN 57 097 720 495) and Smith, Emini and Blumberg owned and operated Hawkswood (ABN 27 098 040 683).
- Smith, Emini and Blumberg controlled the Singapore domiciled and British Virgin Island registered company Riqueza despite the company not being owned by them.
- Riqueza had an account with Opes Prime for the purposes of securities lending and equity financing.
- Riqueza provided a conduit for moving shares and money between Opes Prime and the two companies Leveraged Capital and Hawkswood.
- Leveraged Capital assets were used to provide collateral to the Riqueza account. (The specific assets mentioned in evidence were the Coeur d'Alene Mines shares which Norm Seckold had lodged with Leveraged Capital as security for his borrowings from Leveraged Capital.) The first time this occurred was in June 2006.
- The use of assets in this way occurred on a number of other occasions between June 2006 and March 2008. Leveraged Capital and Hawkswood assets were also used, via Riqueza, to provide collateral to the accounts of Chris Murphy an Opes Prime client with whom Emini and Smith had a business relationship.
- When Norm Seckold sought the return of his shares from Leveraged Capital, they had been passed to Riqueza for it to use as collateral for itself and other Opes Prime accounts in a cross margin group.
- The shares were in turn being used by Opes Prime to provide collateral for its financing position with ANZ Bank. Riqueza was unable to provide replacement collateral to Opes Prime so Opes Prime was unable to redeem the shares from ANZ Bank. As a result, Riqueza could not return the shares to Leveraged Capital and it could not return them to Norm Seckold.
- ASIC alleges that Smith, Emini and Blumberg sought to resolve this impasse by means of an agreement with ANZ Bank.
- At this time the ANZ Bank was in the position that if there had been a default by Opes Prime, it (ANZ Bank) would have had to settle its account with Opes Prime at then current market prices and this would have resulted in a surplus in favour of Opes Prime of some $240 million.
- The agreement reached required Opes Prime to grant ANZ Bank a charge over its assets and an amendment to their mutual securities lending agreement which would remove ANZ Bank's obligation to repay the $240 million in surplus value to Opes Prime and its clients.
- In return for these benefits, ANZ Bank released Norm Seckold's shares so that they could be returned to Leveraged Capital and then to him.
- The value of the agreement was $95 million whereas the potential shortfall in Opes Prime's accounts was as high as $200 million.

== Criminal proceedings ==
=== 21 March 2011 ===
A directions hearing took place before Justice Paul Coghlan in Court 11 of The Supreme Court of Victoria in the matters of R v Lirim Emini, R v Anthony Charles Blumberg and R v Julian Alexander Smith.

At the hearing, Emini's counsel indicated that the case against his client had been "resolved" and that an agreed statement of facts was being prepared for a plea hearing. Emini's case was adjourned until 9 May 2011 at which time the indication is that he will plead guilty to amended charges, provide a statement and be sent for sentencing.

Blumberg's counsel and the prosecutor both indicated that fruitful discussions had taken place between them and that there was every likelihood that they too would reach agreement in relation to a plea prior to 9 May 2011. Blumberg's case was also adjourned until 9 May 2011. The indication is that Blumberg too will plead guilty at that date and be sent for sentencing.

Smith's counsel indicated that his client would be going to trial and that a period of 4 to 6 weeks would be required to hear the matter. The prosecuting counsel had indicated that 6 to 8 weeks would be required to hear the evidence which extends to 34 lever-arch files. Smith's counsel felt that less time would be needed because the defence argument would be narrow and would focus on Smith's alleged lack of knowledge of the true financial state of Riqueza. Smith's counsel also indicated that he would negotiate with prosecutors in due course. Justic Coghlan stressed the importance of acting quickly. "In due course means now," Justice Coghlan said. "I don't know what it is Mr Fitzgerald's client [Emini] might say in his statement, but that might be something your client wants to see."

A date of 18 July 2011 was set for Smith's trial with a review on 9 May 2011 to confirm that this date is still practicable within the court's lists.

=== 9 May 2011 ===
A further directions hearing took place before Justice Coghlan. The prosecutor, Mark Gibson, indicated that the case against Blumberg had also been "resolved" and that, "It is the intention of Mr Emini and Mr Blumberg, as I understand it, to make inculpatory statements against Mr Smith". The statements would be ready within a month. Blumberg and Emini were ordered to appear on 18 July 2011 at which time they are expected to plead guilty and be sentenced.

Smith's trial was set to commence on 25 July 2011.

=== 18 July 2011 – Emini and Blumberg plead guilty ===
Laurie Emini and Anthony Blumberg appeared before Justice David Beach in Court 1 of the Supreme Court of Victoria. As expected from representations to the directions hearings, they pleaded guilty to amended charges.

Emini pleaded guilty to:

- Two charges of dishonestly using his position as a director of Leveraged Capital Pty Ltd with the intention of gaining an advantage for Riqueza Holdings Limited or himself contrary to s.184(2)(a) Corporations Act 2001;
- One charge of recklessly failing to exercise his powers and discharge his duties as a director of Opes Prime Stockbroking Limited (OPSL) contrary to s.184(1)(a) Corporations Act 2001.

Blumberg pleaded guilty to:

- One charge of using his position dishonestly with the intention of gaining an advantage for himself or someone else contrary to s.184(2)(a) Corporations Act 2001.

In an agreed statement of facts presented to the hearing, the prosecuting counsel, Dr Gregory Lyon SC, indicated that control was taken of Riqueza in 2006 in order to provide "financial engineering" via the Opes Prime balance sheet in breach of ASX Rules to enable Leveraged Capital to continue to operate despite a reduction in its borrowing limit by ANZ Bank.

Shares deposited with Leveraged Capital in exchange for loans were also used via this route to cover the margin position for Opes Prime's largest client, Chris Murphy, who had a business relationship with Leveraged Capital. This was carried out in accordance with an agreement struck with Murphy that there would be no margin requirements. "You don't have to worry as we will always cover you if you go into margin anyway", Emini had written in an email to Murphy.

Lyon called for a sentence at the bottom of the range for Emini, praising the "remarkable" co-operation he had given authorities since the collapse. He went further and stated, "It is submitted by the Commonwealth that he is entitled to the maximum discount". He then called for Emini to serve between 12 and 17 months' jail before being eligible for parole. He also indicated that Blumberg should serve between 6 and 12 months' jail, but stated that the Crown would not oppose a defence submission that he be jailed for less than 6 months.

The case against Julian Smith was adjourned for trial in the Supreme Court of Victoria on 11 April 2012.

=== 27 July 2011 - Emini and Blumberg Sentenced ===
Laurie Emini and Anthony Blumberg appeared before Justice David Beach for sentencing on the charges to which they had pleaded guilty on 18 July 2011.

In passing sentence Justice Beach made a number of comments in relation to the charges and the actions of the two accused. He indicated that, "Whilst the collapse of Opes Prime is part of the background of the circumstances to your offending it must be remembered that each of you falls to be sentenced for the offending to which you have pleaded guilty rather than for some broad and uncharged allegation that you each engaged in fraudulent conduct which caused Opes Prime to collapse." He indicated that the settlement with ANZ and Merrill Lynch made it ''difficult to quantify any loss to [Opes Prime's] creditors as a result of the criminal conduct of each of you." He further stated that, "Sentences which require each of you to spend actual time in custody are necessary, having regard to the seriousness of the offending of each of you, and the necessity to deter others from like offending."

In relation to the specific charges against Emini that he improperly transferred assets between companies he controlled, Justice Beach found the transfers were dishonest. "In a nutshell the transfers were seen by you as a short term solution enabling the business to continue trading whilst long term resolutions could be found for these problems. That said, making these transfers was dishonest in circumstances where you were personally conflicted as you were a director and beneficial interest holder in OPSL [Opes Prime Stockbroking Limited] and you were also a director of another company which benefited from these transfers."

In respect of Blumberg who was charged in respect of the agreement entered into with ANZ Bank for the provision of a $95 million loan, the court found that Blumberg knew there was a good chance that Opes Prime was insolvent and wouldn't be able to repay the money. Justice Beach commented, "Ultimately I accept that you knowingly engaged in this improper and dishonest transaction for the purpose of attempting to keep OPSL, a company in which you had a substantial interest, in business."

In mitigation, Justice Beach noted in respect of Emini that, "Your disclosures not only assisted the Crown's case against you but also against Mr Blumberg and another accused who is yet to stand trial." He found that Emini's co-operation with ASIC, including providing a 64- page statement and a 125-page folder of important emails, had been "at the highest level". He also indicated that Blumberg's co-operation had helped Opes Prime's liquidators recover $226 million from the broker's financiers, ANZ and Merrill Lynch, which was distributed to victims. He further indicated that both men suffered from depression, had unblemished records prior to the offending for which they were charged and were unlikely to offend again.

He concluded with, "Having said all that the only sentence that is appropriate in the circumstances of these offences is imprisonment. The offences were as I have said serious."

Justice Beach sentenced Emini to two years in jail and Blumberg to one year. If they are of good behaviour, Emini will be released after one year on a one-year good behaviour bond and Blumberg will be released after six months on a six-month good behaviour bond. Blumberg's sentence was backdated to 18 July 2011 when he was placed on remand after declining to apply for bail.

Following the sentencing of Emini and Blumberg, directions were given for them, Opes Prime client Chris Murphy and Leveraged Capital client Norm Seckold to appear in the supreme court on 15 August 2011 to give preliminary evidence in the case against Julian Smith which is set down for hearing on 11 April 2012.

=== 22 July 2013 - Smith on Trial ===
Julian Smith's trial, originally scheduled for 11 April 2012, was deferred until 29 May 2012. The trial did not open for public hearings and was further deferred for the resolution of certain legal matters and ultimately rescheduled for hearing on 22 July 2013.

The trial got underway on 22 July 2013 before Justice Simon Whelan. The prosecuting counsel is Dr Gregory Lyon SC and the defence counsel is Mark Regan. Smith pleaded not guilty to two counts of using his position as a director dishonestly to obtain advantage.

Opening statements

In presenting his opening statement, Dr Lyon repeated a number of allegations outlined at earlier proceedings but he went further and also referenced items of evidence to support his contentions. The crux of the allegations is that Smith obtained a $95m loan from ANZ Bank by pledging the assets of two Opes Prime companies, but that the loan was actually used to prop up the financial position of Leveraged Capital, a company of which Smith was a director and shareholder. He further indicated that Smith knowingly misrepresented Opes Prime's financial position in order to obtain the loan. He advised the jury that, "This is the world of big business … It's not theft or murder. It's using his position as a company director dishonestly" "An honest director would not have signed the loan documents". Smith was prepared to let Opes Prime take on this "crushing burden" despite it not being in the company's best interest.

In support of his allegations, Dr Lyon referenced a number of emails which he contended showed that Smith was clearly aware of the true position of the company. In one email from CEO Laurie Emini to Smith dated 9 March 2008, Emini reported a $116m shortfall in the account of Chris Murphy and that he would be stepping down as CEO. Smith replied by saying "one for all, all for one" and that the decline in the share price of Murphy's favoured stock Challenger (which decline had caused the shortfall in his account) was "temporary and a huge opportunity". "Once we have got ANZ off our backs we can think about that". Dr Lyon pointed out that Smith's response demonstrated that he had "a very clear understanding of the situation facing Opes". "His email expresses no surprise or uncertainty. His email expresses no reproval". Dr Lyon also indicated that Smith had sent an email to staff in which he demanded to be kept up to date on company developments. "The emails are evidence which shows Mr Smith was far from kept in the dark".

In a new revelation, Dr Lyon indicated that Smith had been warned that accounts held by Norm Seckold and Chris Murphy were a risk to the company. The risk committee had identified five areas of risk including these two accounts and the company's reliance on ANZ Bank as a source of finance. The committee recommended placing limits on Murphy's account, removing his ability to borrow 100% of the value of his stock and seeking more diversity in his holdings. The committee further indicated that the company would be "significantly impacted" if Seckold sought the return of his shares because Leveraged Capital had been using the free margin on the account as a buffer. Smith was also warned that the ANZ could withdraw finance or vary its terms on short notice and that without another source of funding, the company would need to recall funds from its clients. In response Smith accused the committee of a "serious error of judgement" and offered to educate it. Pointing to his decades of experience, he said the report misunderstood securities lending and borrowing. Dr Lyon commented that Smith, "more than just dismissed the issues raised on behalf of the risk committee, he dismissed them and smacks them down for being misinformed and uneducated".

In presenting his opening statement for the defence, Regan told the court that Smith's intention was to rescue his company and he did not commit a crime. He denied that Smith deliberately misrepresented Opes Prime's position. He indicated that Smith had provided a personal guarantee for the loan and would not have knowingly risked his "life accumulated wealth" if he gave the guarantee knowing that the company would soon collapse. "It's a financially suicidal act both for the companies and his own wealth". In commenting on the prosecution case he said, "We say there is something fundamentally wrong with their case theory".

Mr Regan told the court the evidence will show that in the lead-up to signing the lifeline deal with ANZ, that Smith took "reasonable and appropriate steps based on the information that was available to him". This included going to lawyers Hall & Wilcox, rather than "jumping on a plane to South Africa". "We say that that mitigates against dishonesty in this case. It's as simple as that", Regan said. "The honest director, in the shoes of Mr Smith, signed the co-operation deed as a lifeline".

Mr Regan also commented on the actions of ANZ Bank. He said that ANZ's decision to foreclose on the loan a week after issuing it raised questions about the bank's motives. "One has to wonder whether the ANZ Bank's loss of appetite for continued support had anything to do with the fact that they had got the long sought-after change to the AMSLA (Australian Master Securities Lending Agreement) on March 20."

He urged jurors not to be daunted by the big dollar figures involved in the case and to remove the benefit of hindsight from their minds.

Evidence

Although witnesses were called from the conclusion of the counsels' opening statements on 30 July 2013, the first reported evidence was that of former Opes Prime director Laurie Emini.

Emini told the court that Smith was aware that shares pledged by mining identity Norm Seckold were being used as a buffer and that he was also aware of the transactions between Opes Prime and Riqueza using Seckold's shares. The jury was shown emails from Smith to Opes Prime employees regarding Seckold's shares and transactions between Riqueza and Opes Prime. When asked by counsel as to why Smith had issued these instructions, Emini replied, "I think Mr smith was cleaning up the accounts of Leveraged Capital and crystallising any losses etc within those accounts". Seckold had earlier told the court that he had no knowledge that his shares had been transferred to Riqueza.

Emini further indicated that he had transferred assets of Hawkswood (the venture capital company owned by Smith, Emini and Blumberg) to cover shortfalls in the Murphy accounts until those assets were exhausted. In later cross examination by the defence, he indicated that Smith had not been included on the email in December 2007 that had detailed the initial $20 million shortfall in the Murphy accounts, but also said that he had not hidden the fact that he started using directors' shares and cash to prop up the Murphy accounts from Smith or Blumberg. He did, however, admit that he had not told Smith that he was double counting securities and that he could not recall whether he had told Smith that Norm Seckold's account "might be used for short-term liquidity funding".

The jury was told that Smith was spending a week every four to five weeks in Singapore and had relocated to Sydney in late 2007 and travelled to Melbourne for board meetings. Emini, however, indicated that Smith was communicating with him in early 2008 despite his move to Sydney, had knowledge of the problem accounts and was involved from the first meeting with financier ANZ Bank. He also told the court that Smith's knowledge of securities lending was "second to none" and that he was known as a leader in that industry with extensive experience of the industry.

Emini spoke of his devastation when he was informed by Chris Murphy that he (Murphy) could not get financial support from billionaire James Packer - an option he had earlier flagged along with securitising his property portfolio which was worth more than $10m. Emini told the court that he had nowhere to move at that time, because Opes had insufficient cash - only about $12 million - to cover the shortfall and would therefore fail the ASX liquid capital requirements.

Another person who gave evidence earlier was Dean Boyle, Opes Primes' chief operating officer. He spoke of approaching Smith in February 2008 about his concerns regarding the negative equity position in Chris Murphy's account which at that stage was $78.5m. Boyle stated that Smith, "rolled his eyes and said, 'Dean you don't know what Laurie, Anthony and I have got. Put a stop to this shit now and get on with your job'."

John Lindholm, the Opes Prime liquidator, followed Emini and gave evidence that the changes made to the AMSLA between Opes and ANZ Bank had cost Opes between $205 million and $270 million. "That is our estimate of the cost to the company of the varied AMSLA and then them [ANZ] having first dibs on the money as secured creditor. It was really the AMSLA that cost the money," he said. "So rather than being a debtor for the business of $195 million, they sold all the security down and said, 'We are still owed $77 million'."

Julian Smith was found not guilty on 6 September 2013
