= Open Up (Cog song) =

Single by Cog
- Released: March 3, 2003
- Recorded: 2002
- Genre: Progressive rock
- Length: 27:42
- Label: Little Samurai Records; MGM Distribution
- Producer(s): Cog

Cog singles chronology
"Pseudo" (2000)	"Open Up" (2003)	"Resonate" (2005)

"Open Up" is a song released by the Australian rock band Cog in March 2003. It peaked at number 81 on the ARIA charts.

== Track listing ==
1. "Open Up" – 4:05
2. "Open Up a Little More" – 2:36
3. "Moshiach" (full length) – 6:43
4. "Paris, Texas" (full length) – 6:13
5. "Open Says'a'me Remix" – 8:05

== Personnel ==
=== Tracks 1 and 2 ===
- Flynn Gower – guitar and lead vocals
- Lucius Borich – drums, vocals, samples
- Luke Gower – bass, vocals
- Produced by Cog
- Recorded and engineered by Sean Boucher
- Mixed by Dave Petrovic
- Mastered by Toby Learmont

=== Tracks 3 and 4 ===
- Flynn Gower – guitar and lead vocals
- Lucius Borich – drums, bass, vocals, samples
- Produced by Cog
- Recorded by Cog, except vocals, recorded by Hamish Adam
- Mixed by "Zak" and Cog
- Mastered by Marsen Murad and Michael Macken

=== Track 5 ===
- Produced and arranged by Sean Boucher and DJ SIlk
- Mixed by Dave Petrovic

== Charts ==
Chart (2003)	Peak position
Australian (ARIA Charts)	81
