= MGM Distribution =

Australian music distributor

- Company type: Corporation
- Industry: Music entertainment
- Founded: in 1998
- Headquarters: Sydney
- Area served: Australia
- Key people: Sebastian Chase (CEO/founder); Mark Bolton (general manager)
- Products: Distribution of records, CDs and music downloads
- Website: MGM Distribution

MGM Distribution (Metropolitan Groove Merchants) is the largest independent distributor of Australian music and music related merchandise. It was established in April 1998 by Sebastian Chase.

MGM Distribution was set up specifically as a distribution hub to service independent labels and artists. MGM Distribution is focused on a specific agenda – dealing with retail, promoting its releases to retail, ensuring that orders are filled correctly and dispatched expediently.

MGM is not a label and does not sign artists. As a distributor, MGM requires that the labels market their releases to the media to create demand that causes sell through at retail.

MGM Distribution is a major financial supporter of the Australian Music Prize and the JB Seed grant program, an arts grants fund established by John Butler in 2005.

== Artists ==
- Alcotomic (Magneto Records)
- Arrows (Hobbledehoy Record Co)
- Bad Moon Born (Unsigned)
- The Basics (Independent)
- The Beautiful Girls (San Dumo/Independent)
- Ben Mitchell (Independent)
- Birds of Tokyo (Independent)
- Blue King Brown (Roots Level Records)
- Bukkcity (Unda K9)
- Butterfingers (Valley Trash Records)
- Carus and The True Believers (Independent)
- The Church (Unorthodox Records)
- Cog (Different Music/Little Samurai)
- The Community Chest (Igloo Records)
- The Conglomerate (Independent, debut album only)
- CRVZII (Nufirm Records)
- Dan Webb (Misdemeanor Records)
- Drawn from Bees (Bonefinger Records)
- The E.L.F. (Oaks Records)
- Edward Guglielmino (Independent)
- Emily Wurramara (Wantok Music)
- Endorphin (Seduction Records)
- Epicure (Independent)
- Front counter (Independent)
- The Flairz (Lefroy Records)
- Hungry Kids of Hungary (Independent)
- Intercooler (Rhythm Ace)
- Jacqui Hunt (Auraphonic)
- The Jezabels (Independent)
- John Butler Trio (Jarrah Records)
- Karnivool (Independent)
- Kate Miller-Heidke (Waterbear Records)
- Lior (Senso Unico)
- The Little Stevies (Independent)
- Lucky Fonz III (Cruiserweight Records)
- Mark Wilkinson (Independent)
- Mia Dyson (Backdoor Records)
- The Panda Band (Bamboo Records)
- The Panics (LittleBIGMAN Records)
- The Peep Tempel (Wing Sing)
- The Pigram Brothers (Pigram Music)
- Tecoma (Polaris Music)
- Tin Alley
- The Preytells (Independent)
- Resin Dogs (Hydrofunk Records)
- Sam Clark (PLW Entertainment)
- Sarah McLeod (Naughty Mouse Ink/Independent)
- Sekiden (Valve Records)
- Sheppard (Empire of Song)
- Skipping Girl Vinegar (Popboomerang)
- Sneaky Sound System (Whack Records)
- Superengine (Q-Stik Records)
- Turnstyle (Igloo Records)
- The Vines (Wicked Nature Music)
- The Waifs (Jarrah Records)

== See also ==
- List of record labels
