= Recoil (disambiguation) =

Recoil is the backward momentum of a gun when it is discharged.

Recoil may also refer to:

== Science ==
- Atomic recoil, in physics, a result of a type of particle interaction
- Recoil (rheology), a rheological phenomenon in non-Newtonian fluids

== Film and television ==
- The Recoil (1917 film), an American silent drama film directed by George Fitzmaurice
- The Recoil (1922 film), a British silent crime film directed by Geoffrey Malins
- The Recoil (1924 film), an American silent drama film directed by T. Hayes Hunter
- Recoil (1953 film), a British crime film directed by John Gilling
- Recoil (1998 film), an American action film starring Gary Daniels
- Recoil (2011 film), a Canadian action film starring "Stone Cold" Steve Austin and Danny Trejo
- "Recoil" (CSI: Miami), a television episode
- "Recoil" (The Gentle Touch), a television episode
- "Recoil" (The Shield), a television episode

== Literature ==
- Recoil (magazine), an American firearms magazine
- Recoil, a 1953 novel by Jim Thompson
- Recoil, a 2006 Nick Stone Missions novel by Andy McNab
- Recoil, a 2008 StarFist: Force Recon Series novel by David Sherman and Dan Cragg

== Music ==
- Recoil (band), a musical project led by ex-Depeche Mode member Alan Wilder
- Recoil (album), by Nonpoint, 2004
- "Recoil", a song by Ani DiFranco from Knuckle Down, 2005
- "Recoil", a song by Daysend from Within the Eye of Chaos, 2010
- "Recoil", a song by Flesh Field from Strain, 2004
- "Recoil", a song by Magazine from Real Life, 1978
- "Recoil", a song by New Order from Lost Sirens, 2013
- "Recoil", a song by TZU from Smiling at Strangers, 2005

== Other uses ==
- Recoil (G.I. Joe), a fictional character in the G.I. Joe universe
- Recoil (video game), a 1999 tank-based Windows computer game
- Recoil (Wonderla Hyderabad), a roller coaster in India
- Recoil Glacier, Antarctica
