= New, Rare, Live =

Compilation album by Superheist
- Released: 15 November 2004 (Australia)
- Recorded: 1993–2003
- Genre: Nu metal
- Length: Disc One – 34:40; Disc Two – 49:22
- Label: Shock Records
- Producer: DW Norton

Superheist chronology
| Identical Remote Controlled Reactions (2002) | New, Rare, Live (2004) | Ghosts of the Social Dead (2016) |

New, Rare, Live is a 2004 compilation album by the Australian band Superheist. It includes the band's final recorded songs with earlier songs and live recordings of the group's final concert at Melbourne in 2003.

== Background ==
In mid 2003, Superheist began working on their third studio album. However, after a turbulent second half of the year touring, loss of management and an eventual disastrous band breakup, the album was never completed. There were however four new tracks completed featuring Joey Biro on vocals ("Seasons, Get A Life, Vultures and Hole in the Head") and an additional single, "The Road", with Cam Baines of Bodyjar on lead vocals. These five tracks were later released with a bunch of B-sides from Supeheist's back catalogue and this became disc 1 of New, rare, Live. The second CD of the compilation was originally meant to be a stand-alone live release; however, due to the band split it became part of this compilation.

== Track listing ==
- AUS Double CD SHOCK7034
  - Disc 1 – New.Rare.
    1. "The Road (Ft. Cam Baines)" – 2:20
    2. "Seasons" – 4:09
    3. "Get A Life" – 3:56
    4. "Vultures" – 3:05
    5. "Hole in the Head" – 4:41
    6. "Ready To Burn" – 2:43
    7. "8 Miles High" – 4:12
    8. "Label" – 2:52
    9. "Pocket Full of Lies" – 3:42
    10. "Times Killing" – 3:04
  - Disc 2 – Live.'
    1. "Untitled Medley" [Hayley Katoma] – 3:53
    2. "Liberate" – 2:45
    3. "Empire" – 3:07
    4. "Step Back" – 3:13
    5. "Two Faced (Check Your Head Up)" – 3:17
    6. "The Hollow Blue" – 4:01
    7. "7 Years" – 2:57
    8. "Slide" – 4:10
    9. "Bullet" – 4:21
    10. "Beaming Down From Satellites" – 4:43
    11. "Scars" – 3:12
    12. "The Ghost" – 4:31
    13. "Pulse" – 4:12

== Personnel ==
New.Rare

- Richard William "D W" Norton – guitar, backing vocals (all tracks) bass (tracks 1–5)
- Sean Pentecost – drums (all tracks)
- Fetah Sabawi – synthesisers, samplers (all tracks)
- Drew Dedman – bass guitar (track 6)
- Simon Durrant – bass guitar (track 7–10)
- Cam Baines – lead vocals (track 1)
- Joey Biro – lead vocals (tracks 2–6)
- Rod McLeod – lead vocals (tracks 7–10)

Live

- Richard William "D W" Norton – lead guitar, backing vocals, producer on all tracks
- Drew Dedman – bass guitar
- Sean Pentecost – drums
- Fetah Sabawi – synthesisers, samplers
- Joey Biro – lead vocals
