= Severance =

Severance may refer to:

== Arts and entertainment ==
- Severance (film), a 2006 British horror film
- Severance (novel), a 2018 novel by Ling Ma
- Severance, a 2006 short-story collection by Robert Olen Butler
- Severance (TV series), a 2022 Apple TV+ science fiction series
- Severance (album), by Daysend, 2003
- Severances, a 1989 album by Masami Akita, recording as SCUM
- "Severance", a 1988 song by Dead Can Dance from The Serpent's Egg
- Severance: Blade of Darkness, a 2001 fantasy action video game

== Finance and law ==
- Severance (land), the division of land that does not require a plan of subdivision
- Severance, the ending of a joint tenancy other than by death
- Severance package, pay and benefits when an employee loses their job
- Severance tax, a tax on non-renewable natural resources

== Structures ==
- Severance Hall, a concert hall in Cleveland, Ohio, US
- Severance Hospital, in Seoul, Korea

== Places in the United States ==
- Severance, Colorado
- Severance, Idaho, now Careywood
- Severance, Kansas
- Severance Township, Sibley County, Minnesota
- Severance, New York
- Severance Lake, a lake in Sibley County, Minnesota

== People ==
- Alexander Severance (1905–1985), American basketball player and coach
- Avery W. Severance (1819–1874), New York assemblyman
- Carol Severance (1944–2015), American science fiction writer
- Caroline Severance (1820–1914), American abolitionist and suffragist
- Charles Severance (computer scientist), American computer scientist and academic
- Charles Severance (serial killer) (born 1960), American serial killer
- Cordenio Severance (1862–1925), American lawyer
- Dave Severance (1919–2021), American Marine Corps officer
- Frank Severance (1856–1931), American historian
- H. Craig Severance (1879–1941), American architect
- Joan Severance (born 1958), American actress
- John L. Severance (1863–1936), American businessperson
- Juliet Stillman Severance (1833–1919), American physician and feminist
- Louis Severance (1838–1913), American oilman
- Lucinda Clark Severance (1843–1921), Hawaiian clubwoman
- Luther Severance (1797–1855), American diplomat
