= Sidewinder (album) =

Album by Superheist

Studio album by Superheist
- Released: 3 May 2019
- Genre: Nu metal; rap metal
- Label: Black Mountain Music
- Producer: dw Norton

Superheist chronology
| Ghosts of the Social Dead (2016) | Sidewinder (2019) | MMXX (2022) |

Singles from Sidewinder
- 1. "The Riot" Released: 1 April 2019

Professional ratings
Review scores
| Source | Rating |
|---|---|
| Hysteria Mag | 7/10 stars |
| Heavy Mag | 4/5 stars |
| Loud Magazine | 78/100 |

Sidewinder is the fourth album from Australian nu metal band Superheist, released on 3 May 2019 through Black Mountain Music. The album was announced on 1 April 2019 alongside the release of the first single "The Riot", and a music video for the track was released on the band's YouTube channel the same day. It is the first Superheist release to feature bassist Si Durrant since 2000's 8 Miles High and the first album to feature guitarist Keir Gotcher and former Devil You Know (now known as Light the Torch) drummer John Sankey. It is the final album to feature vocalist Ezekiel Ox before his departure in July 2020.

At the AIR Awards of 2020, the album was nominated for Best Independent Heavy Album or EP.

== Track listing ==
| No. | Title | Length |
|---|---|---|
| 1. | "The Riot" | 3:50 |
| 2. | "Crush the Crisis" | 4:09 |
| 3. | "Overlord" | 4:09 |
| 4. | "Shockwaves" (featuring London) | 4:36 |
| 5. | "Breathe" | 4:45 |
| 6. | "Trauma" | 4:27 |
| 7. | "And So We Burn" (featuring Dana Roskvist) | 3:45 |
| 8. | "One of a Kind" | 3:32 |
| 9. | "God Knows" | 3:06 |

CD Bonus Tracks
| No. | Title | Length |
|---|---|---|
| 10. | "Raise Hell" | 4:06 |
| 11. | "Got the Bounce" | 3:59 |
| 12. | "Fully Loaded" | 3:53 |

== Personnel ==
Superheist

- Ezekiel Ox – vocals
- dw Norton – guitar, keyboards
- Keir Gotcher – guitar
- Simon Durrant – bass
- John Sankey – drums

Additional musicians

- London – vocals on "Shockwaves"
- Dana Roskvist – vocals on "And So We Burn"
