= Frankenbok =

Australian heavy metal band

- Blood Oath line-up (left to right): Mick Morley, Adam B. Metal, Scott Lang, Tim Miedeckie, Aaron Butler

Background information
- Origin: Melbourne, Victoria, Australia
- Genres: Groove metal, thrash metal
- Years active: 1997–present
- Labels: Faultline, Dark Carnival, Roadrunner, Prime Cuts, Fairdinkum Records, XMUSIC
- Members: Aaron Butler; Adam Glynn; Tom Rossell; Owen Spratling
- Past members: Adam B. Metal; Scott Lang; Dan Macdougall; Mick Morley; Daniel White; Nathan 'Yeti' Amatnieks; Tim Miedecke
- Website: frankenbok.net

Frankenbok is an Australian heavy metal band from Melbourne. The band was founded in 1997 by guitarist Aaron Butler and vocalist Adam 'Hutch' Glynn and have since released seven full-length albums and one EP. Frankenbok have toured Australia on numerous occasions, building a strong cult following in their homeland.

The band continues to release music, with their most recent album Overdose released in 2022, and remains active in the Australian metal scene through live performances and festivals.

The current Frankenbok line-up consists of Aaron Butler (guitar), Tom Rossell (drums), Owen Spratling (bass and backing vocals), Adam 'Hutch' Glynn (vocals), and Nathan 'Yeti' Amatnieks (guitar). The group is currently signed to Perth-based record label Prime Cuts.

== Band history ==
=== Formative years, 1997–1999 ===
Following his return from Florida and having been heavily influenced by that region's death metal scene, Aaron Butler recruited former Bacterium vocalist Adam 'Hutch' Glynn. Their moniker was taken from a demo tape Butler had made during his time in the United States. Whilst teaching some locals a few Australian colloquialisms, one participant mispronounced the slang term "fair dinkum" as "frankenbok".

Butler and Glynn were later joined by former Zombonol members Tim Miedecke and Scott Lang, on bass and guitar respectively. Unable to find a suitable drummer, the band took to playing live with a drum machine. In 1998, a demo was recorded. Little came of it, and it was never officially released. Frankenbok's unusual mix of grinding, death metal rhythms, thrashing riffs and eclectic, Mike Patton-inspired vocals interspersed with guttural death growls helped them gain attention and stand out from the majority in the metal scene of the time.

In 1999, following sustained gigging in the local underground metal scene, Frankenbok attracted the attention of producer/engineer Richie 'DW' Norton (also known for playing guitar in Australian band Superheist), who offered to record Frankenbok's debut album and release it via his Faultline Records imprint.

=== Greetings & Salutations, 1999–2000 ===
Recording sporadically between February and September at Backbeach Studios in Rye, Victoria, Frankenbok's debut album finally saw the light of day in early 2000. Greetings & Salutations features ten tracks, ranging from the grindcore moments of "Linguistics" to the tongue-in-cheek, Faith No More-inspired "P. Cloned". Frankenbok later jokingly dubbed their sound as "Taco Metal". Bassist Miedecke described it as "A lot of meat with a little bit of cheese") amidst the radical categorization within the heavy metal fraternity.

Despite the album being recorded with a drum machine, Mick Morley had joined the group in August 1999 before the album was completed. This allowed Frankenbok more freedom and versatility on the live front, evidenced by the band winning the Melbourne Metro Nightclub's Battle of the Bands. Frankenbok went on to tour supporting US metallers Skinlab in May. They made their first of many appearances at the Metal for the Brain Festival in Canberra in October, alongside the likes of Voivod, Alchemist and Blood Duster. Following a continued strong showing on the live front, the group signed with Dark Carnival, the developmental offshoot of Roadrunner Australia, in late 2000.

=== Loopholes & Great Excuses, 2001–2002 ===
Released in early 2001 on Dark Carnival, The Loopholes & Great Excuses EP, recorded with DW Norton at Backbeach Studios, proved a minor hit for Frankenbok. Their tongue-in-cheek cover of Madison Avenue's kitsch dance hit "Don't Call Me Baby" earned the group airplay on youth/alternative radio.

Mid-2001 saw the commencement of the six-week, nationwide 'Devastation Vacation' tour with Dreadnaught. Frankenbok also opened for Slayer and Machine Head in May. They played Metal for the Brain for the second time on 20 October 2001. Also around this time the group landed the support slot for two cancelled Slipknot tours as well as the cancelled Kittie tour.

In 2002, their debut album Greetings & Salutations (Special Edition) was re-released on Dark Carnival with an additional eight bonus tracks recorded at the Bleach Club in Sydney in August 2001. Also around this time, Frankenbok opened for System of a Down, toured with Sydneysiders Psi.Kore, and appeared at the Overcranked Festival in Brisbane, Australia. Despite regular touring and small-scale commercial success, vocalist Adam 'Hutch' Glynn left the band due to a falling out between band members and Glynn in November 2002 with recording time set for their follow-up to Loopholes...

Adam Glynn went on to form his own various side projects including technical metal band Five Star Prison Cell and Coitus Bund (with Rebekah Chapman).

=== Blood Oath, 2003–2005 ===
Following Glynn's departure, Frankenbok carried out auditions to fill the vocal position, with former Negative Hold frontman Adam B. Metal (a.k.a. Adam Miles) finally selected to fill the vacancy in January 2003. Drummer Mick Morley suffered a hand injury in early 2003, causing Devolved drummer John Sankey to fill in behind the kit for Frankenbok's national tours with Skinlab and Swedish melodic metallers Soilwork. The year also saw release of Frankenbok's second official studio album and first for Roadrunner Australia, entitled Blood Oath (in reference to the Australian colloquialism "bloody oath").

Despite being recorded again at Backbeach Studios with DW Norton behind the mixing desk, Blood Oath saw a change in direction for the band, with more thrash metal influences being introduced, more melodic passages present and Adam B. Metal's vocals being in stark contrast to those of former vocalist Glynn. Despite their change in direction, Blood Oath proved to be Frankenbok's most successful album to date, and eventually gained a European release in 2004. Live dates followed, including an appearance at Metal for the Brain (in December 2003, as 2002's event had been cancelled due to litigation which Frankenbok had also been confirmed for) and the nationwide 'Blood Letting' tour with Daysend (who featured members of former touring companions Psi.Kore) in support of their recent album.

The following year (2004) included the 'Army of Darkness' tour with Sunk Loto, Full Scale and 8 Foot Sativa as well as further touring the east coast with Walk the Earth (producer DW Norton's group) and Frankenbok's first live dates overseas, touring New Zealand with local band 8 Foot Sativa in late 2004 on the 'Hatred Forever' tour. The 2005 edition of Metal for the Brain saw Frankenbok play both the Canberra (the traditional venue) and Brisbane (for the only time in the event's history) dates.

Despite sustained activity on the live front, including another string of dates in New Zealand with 8 Foot Sativa in April, longtime guitarist Scott Lang left the group in late 2005 for professional reasons, relocating overseas to Hong Kong. Fans were surprised when Frankenbok appeared at Brisbane's Overcranked Festival in early 2006 with Adam B. Metal now occupying the second guitarist slot as well as supplying vocals.

=== Murder of Songs, 2006–2008 ===
Flyer for one-off show, 29 November 2007

Persistent touring, Lang's departure and their amicable split with their label Roadrunner in 2005 led to new recorded material being long overdue, despite the fact the band had been playing songs such as "Worship Before the Dead" and other rough versions of songs as far back as 2004.

Throughout 2006, the group periodically lay down tracks for their third full-length release, handling the recording and producing duties themselves with the aim of capturing their renowned live energy onto tape. This marked the first time they recorded away from Backbeach Studios, with guitars and bass recorded at 'The Bat Cave', vocals tracked at 'The Fight Club House' and drums and final mixing overseen by Reggie Bowman at Scream Louder Studios. They also played the final Metal for the Brain on 4 November 2006, the group's fifth appearance at the popular underground heavy metal festival (not including the cancelled 2002 event).

Despite the album being completed by the conclusion of 2006, it did not see release until mid-2007, due to Frankenbok having to find a suitable label. Murder of Songs was finally released on 6 August 2007 on Perth-based label Prime Cuts. Including the already live favourites "Sludge (I Will Make/Take These Horizons)", "Walk This (LIE)fe" and "What Is Real?", Frankenbok's third full-length also proved to be their last with vocalist/guitarist Adam B. Metal, who departed the group in early 2007 prior to the album's release. McDougall Brothers vocalist Dan McDougall was recruited as his replacement soon after. Plans to have former guitarist Scott Lang return did not come to fruition, however. The guitar slot was eventually filled by Cheshire Pile guitarist Nathan 'Yeti' Amatnieks.

A small controversy, seen by many fans as a 'hatchet job', occurred just prior to the release of Murder of Songs when Zoo Magazine published a particularly unfavourable review which detailed little to nothing about the actual release, included unauthorized use of artwork, and stated:

"Aussie hard rockers Frankenbok havent done themselves any favours with this whiffy deposit of ten smelly turds. The songs are nothing if not ironically titled – Failure To Learn? More like Failure To Learn... When To Quit! Tired stuff from a band of blokes who ought to chuck it in and get jobs in IT."

Despite this, the album fared well critically, receiving positive reviews from other sources.

Frankenbok was inactive for most of 2007 due to guitarist Aaron Butler breaking his leg in January in a skateboarding accident. The break was so serious it required a further bone graft operation in October.

With the line-up of Aaron Butler, Tim Miedecke, Mick Morley, Dan McDougall and Yeti now firmly in place, and having made their live debut on 29 November 2007, they started working on a follow-up EP titled Last Ditch Redemption in 2008.

Frankenbok released their eighth studio album, Overdose, in 2022 under Fair Dinkum Records. The album features tracks like "The Reckoning" and "Vicious Intent" and was praised for its return to heavier, thrash-inspired roots. Critics from outlets such as Metal Obsession highlighted its blend of brutality and technicality.

During this period, Frankenbok performed at major festivals, including the Dead of Winter Festival in Brisbane in 2022, where they shared the stage with acts like King Parrot and Lagerstein. The band’s strong live performances continue to attract a loyal fanbase.

On December 10, 2022, Frankenbok celebrated their 25th anniversary with a special performance at The Tote in Melbourne. The event featured performances from all five line-ups of the band, showcasing their evolution over the years.

In 2024, original vocalist Adam 'Hutch' Glynn rejoined the band after Dan McDougall's departure. The current lineup includes Tom Rossell (drums) and Owen Spratling (bass), solidifying Frankenbok’s evolution while retaining their heavy metal roots.

== Band members ==
=== Current line-up ===
- Aaron Butler – guitars (1997–present)
- Tom Rossell – drums (2016–present)
- Owen Spratling – bass (2019–present)
- Adam 'Hutch' Glynn – vocals (1997–2002, 2024–present)

=== Former members ===
- Scott Lang – guitar (1997–2005)
- Adam B. Metal (Adam Miles) – vocals and guitar (2003–2007)
- Daniel White – vocals (2015–2018)
- Nathan 'Yeti' Amatnieks – guitar (2007–2015)
- Mick Morley – drums (1999–2016)
- Tim Miedecke – bass and backing vocals (1997–2017)
- Dan McDougall – vocals (2007–2015, 2019-2024)

== Discography ==
=== Studio albums ===
List of studio albums with selected details
| Title | Details |
|---|---|
| Greetings & Salutations | Released: 1999; Label: Faultline Records (CD 001) |
| Blood Oath | Released: 2003; Label: Roadrunner Records (RR8378-2) |
| Murder of Songs | Released: 2007; Label: Prime Cuts (PC014) |
| The End of All You Know | Released: 2011; Label: Fair Dinkum Records (FDR001) |
| Cheers, Beers & Beards | Released: 2013; Label: Fair Dinkum Records |
| Vicious, Lawless | Released: 2017; Label: Fair Dinkum Records (FDR005) |
| Overdose | Released: 2022; Label: Fair Dinkum Records |

=== Live albums ===
List of live albums with selected details
| Title | Details |
|---|---|
| Overdose Live (At the Bendigo Hotel) | Released: October 2022; Label: Fair Dinkum Records |
| 25 Years of Noise (In One Form or Another) Live at the Tote | Released: 2023; Label: Fair Dinkum Records |

=== EPs ===
List of EPs with selected details
| Title | Details | Peak chart positions |
| Title | Details | AUS |
|---|---|---|
| The Loopholes & Great Excuses EP | Released: 2001; Label: Dark Carnival (DC0004-3) | — |
| The Last Ditch Redemption | Released: 2008; Label: Prime Cuts (PC021) | — |
| Irrepressible | Released: January 2025; Label: Frankenbok | — |
| The Arriba War Honkle | Released: May 2026; Label: xMusic | 54 |
