= Catatonic (album) =

Studio album by Synthetic Breed
- Released: 16 February 2008
- Recorded: 2007
- Studios: Embryonic Studios, Melbourne, Australia
- Genres: Progressive metal; industrial metal; groove metal
- Length: 50:52
- Label: Faultline
- Producer: Vincent Zylstra

Synthetic Breed chronology
Fractured (EP) (2005)	Catatonic (2008)	Perpetual Motion Machine (2010)

Catatonic is the debut album by Australian industrial metal band Synthetic Breed. The album was released on 16 February 2008 under Faultline Records. "Autonomic Deficiency" was re-recorded as "Existence Mechanism" in their 2012 EP Zero Degrees Freedom.

== Track listing ==
All tracks are written by Vinn Zylstra.

Catatonic track listing
No.	Title	Length
1.	"Catatonic"	4:05
2.	"Neuro Connectivity"	4:03
3.	"Fragmented Human Structure"	4:40
4.	"Chaos Theory"	4:19
5.	"Techno Sedation"	3:59
6.	"Modification and Replacement of Inner Soul Circuitry"	2:38
7.	"Simulated Inception"	5:25
8.	"Cybernetics"	3:46
9.	"Autonomic Deficiency"	4:49
10.	"Re-occurring Thought Pattern"	4:42
11.	"Inconclusive Resolution"	4:25
12.	"Negative Articulation" (bonus track)	4:01
Total length:		50:52

== Personnel ==
- Cal Hughes – vocals
- Vinn Zylstra – guitars, electronics, backing vocals, production
- Darcy Mildren – guitars
- Jonas Bahlo – bass, backing vocals
- Daniel Luttick – drums, percussion
