= Chrome Matrix =

EP by Superheist
- Released: (Australia) 8 September 1997
- Recorded: 1996
- Genre: Nu metal, death metal, industrial metal
- Length: 31:18
- Label: Cut-Throat/Shock Records
- Producer: dw Norton; Mark Rachelle

Superheist chronology
| Apocalypse demo (1994) | Chrome Matrix (1997) | 8 Miles High (1999) |

Chrome Matrix is the lesser known debut EP from Australian nu metal band Superheist, released by Cut-Throat / Shock Records in 1997 three years after their first release the Apocalypse demo, of which two hidden songs on the EP originate from.

== Track listing ==
All music is composed by dw Norton and Roderick McLeod except
track 3 by Mark Rachelle (Mushroom Records) and Roderick McLeod

| No. | Title | Length |
|---|---|---|
| 1. | "Chrome Matrix" | 4:07 |
| 2. | "Subhuman" | 6:10 |
| 3. | "Platinum Matrix" | 6:12 |
| 4. | "Truckasaurus" | 11:11 |
| 5. | "Drift" | 3:39 |
| Total length: | | 29:19 |

Notes:

- Track 3 is a remix of track 1
- Track 4 starts at 0:00 and ends at 0:20, followed by 2 minutes and 20 seconds of silence (0:20 - 2:40) and the two hidden songs from Apocalypse demo: the first hidden track starts at 2:40 and the second hidden track starts at 7:23.

== Credits ==
Superheist

- Roderick McLeod - vocals
- dw Norton - guitar
- Adam Donath - bass guitar
- Adam Messenger - drums
- Mark Rachelle - Keyboards

Production

- Mark Rachelle - mixing on 1,2,3 and 5
- dw Norton - mixing on 4
- dw Norton, Roderick McLeod and Mark Rachelle - producer
- John Ruberto, Crystal Mastering - mastering
