= Identical Remote Controlled Reactions =

Studio album by Superheist
- Released: 9 September 2002
- Recorded: 2002
- Studios: Backbeach Studios, Rye
- Genre: Nu metal
- Length: 51:27
- Label: Pivotal/Shock
- Producers: dw Norton; Adam Rhodes

Superheist chronology
The Prize Recruit (2001)	Identical Remote Controlled Reactions (2002)	New, Rare, Live (2004)

Singles from Identical Remote Controlled Reactions
- 1. "7 Years" Released: 2002; 2. "A Dignified Rage" Released: 2002

Identical Remote Controlled Reactions is the second studio album by Australian nu metal group Superheist. It is the only album to feature Joey Biro as lead vocalist. The album proved far stronger than their previous album, The Prize Recruit, in song personality and overall weight in sound. Though not taken as well by critics, it was well received by the fanbase. The album itself seemed far more adventurous in sound, with short instrumental interludes included between songs and far more experimentation with keyboards and bass.

It was recorded at Backbeach Studios in Rye, Victoria by dw Norton and Adam Rhodes.

== Background ==
In August 2001, Superheist supported Eminem at his Sydney concert, they also appeared at various festivals later that year: Livid (October/November), Meredith (mid-December), and Falls (late December). The group signed an international management deal with Gary Avilla (Papa Roach). However, founding lead singer Roderick "Berger" McLeod "no longer shared the band's commitment and enthusiasm" and had left in November.

In the next month he was replaced by Joey Biro (ex-From The Inside). Following the Big Day Out festival in January 2002, the group began work on their second album, Identical Remote Controlled Reactions, which was issued in September. It was co-produced by the band's guitarist Richard William "DW" Norton with Adam Rhodes. They recorded it at Backbeach Studios in Rye, Victoria. It peaked at No. 20 on the ARIA Albums Chart.

The lead single, "7 Years", had appeared in May 2002, which peaked at No. 29 – the group's highest-charting single. It was followed in August by a semi-acoustic rock ballad, "A Dignified Rage", which peaked at No. 50. At the ARIA Music Awards of 2002, Norton and Rhodes were nominated for Engineer of the Year for "A Dignified Rage".

== Track listing ==
All music is composed by Superheist.

Identical Remote Controlled Reactions track listing
No.	Title	Length
1.	"Liberate"	2:52
2.	"Empire"	3:58
3.	"False Idols"	3:06
4.	"7 Years"	2:58
5.	"(New Culture)"	0:37
6.	"Scars"	3:19
7.	"A Dignified Rage"	3:17
8.	"Will the Change"	3:16
9.	"Dear Enemy"	4:18
10.	"Beaming Down from Satellites"	4:07
11.	"(Sugarloaf Hill)"	1:02
12.	"2 Die 4"	2:49
13.	"Drilling the Void"	3:02
14.	"(El Ladonigro)"	0:26
15.	"The Karma Division"	3:06
16.	"Neverend"	2:55
17.	"Tourniquet for a Broken Planet / Salt in the Wounds" (secret track)	6:20
Total length:		51:58

== Personnel ==
Superheist

- dw Norton – guitar, backing vocals, producer
- Sean Pentecost – drums
- Fetah Sabawi – synthesisers, samplers
- Drew Dedman – bass guitar
- Joey Biro – lead vocals

Production work

- Producer, engineer, mixer – Adam Rhodes (tracks 1 to 4, 6 to 10, 12, 13, 15, 16), dw Norton (tracks 1 to 4, 6 to 10, 12, 13, 15, 16), Fetah Sabawi (tracks: 5, 11, 14, 17)
- Additional engineer – Chris Dickie, Forrester Savell, Richard Stolz
  - Assistant engineer – Action Sam, Dan Reymer, Jimi Maroudas, Shae Mete
- Mastering – John Ruberto

== Charts ==
Chart performance for Identical Remote Controlled Reactions
Chart (2002)	Peak position
Australian Albums (ARIA)	20
