= The Prize Recruit =

Studio album by Superheist
- Released: 15 April 2001
- Recorded: 2001
- Studios: Sing Sing Studios, Melbourne
- Genre: Nu metal
- Length: 47:09
- Label: Pivotal/Shock
- Producer: Kalju Tonuma

Superheist chronology
8 Miles High (2000)	The Prize Recruit (2001)	Identical Remote Controlled Reactions (2002)

Singles from The Prize Recruit
- 1. "Crank the System" Released: 2000; 2. "Bullet" Released: 2001; 3. "Step Back/Slide" Released: 2001

The Prize Recruit is the debut full-length album from Australian nu metal band Superheist. It was recorded at Sing Sing Studios in Melbourne by Superheist and producer Kalju Tonuma and released on 15 April 2001. It peaked at No. 12 on the ARIA Albums Chart. At the ARIA Music Awards of 2001, Tonuma was nominated for Producer of the Year and Engineer of the Year for the album.

== Background ==
In April 2001 Superheist's first full-length studio album, The Prize Recruit, was released by Shock Records, it peaked at No. 12 on the ARIA Albums Chart. A reviewer for Rolling Stone described it as "what the new heavy breed should sound like". Theprp.com website's wookubus felt the band "continue to evolve and each facet of their aural expression has been stepped up a notch, from the more encompassing use of programming to the stronger vocal variation and sleeker song structures" with the album generally "a very lush and colorful ride that the listener can literally slip right through, with little to no snags. Sure there are a few moments where things become a little too overtly radio friendly or sound a bit commercially focused, but with the bulk of the material included representing an eclectic blend of energetic modern metal crunch, such things are easy enough to overlook".

The Prize Recruit was produced by Kalju Tonuma (Boom Crash Opera, The Mavis's, Hunters & Collectors) and at the ARIA Music Awards of 2001 he was nominated for Producer of the Year and Engineer of the Year for the album. In March of the following year, a Shock Records representative claimed that the label had spent $250–300,000 on the album and despite sales approaching 35,000 units they were still short of covering their expenses. The second single from the album, "Bullet", had appeared in March 2001, which peaked at No. 45. The album's third single, "Step Back/Slide" (July), had less chart success although it reached the top 100.

== Track listing ==
AUS CD PIVOTAL0001

All music is composed by Superheist.

No.	Title	Length
1.	"The Fight Back"	3:15
2.	"Bullet"	4:10
3.	"Burnt Out Souls"	3:27
4.	"Slide"	4:47
5.	"Deliverance"	4:10
6.	"Uncanny Decadence"	2:48
7.	"Old Again [Eurotrash]"	3:45
8.	"The Ghost"	4:27
9.	"Happy Wasted"	3:06
10.	"Unlearn"	2:53
11.	"Down South"	2:57
12.	"Crank the System"	3:44
13.	"[Hidden Silent Track]"	0:04
14.	"Step Back"	3:35
Total length:		47:09

Industry promo featuring the album with a slightly different edit and track listing:

1. "The Fight Back" – 3:49
2. "Bullet" – 4:10
3. "Burnt Out Souls" – 3:27
4. "Slide" – 4:47
5. "Deliverance" – 4:10
6. "Uncanny Decadence" – 2:48
7. "Old Again (Eurotrash)" – 3:44
8. "The Ghost" – 4:27
9. "Happy Wasted" – 3:06
10. "Unlearn" – 2:53
11. "Down South" – 2:57
12. "Crank the System" – 3:47
13. "Step Back" – 3:34

== Personnel ==
Superheist

- Rod McLeod – lead vocals
- dw Norton – lead guitar, backing vocals
- Sean Pentecost – drums
- Fetah Sabawi – keyboards
- Drew Dedman – bass guitar

Production work

- Kalju Tonuma – producer, engineer
- Jimi Maroudas, Nick Cervonaro, Richard Stolz – assistant engineer
- Stephen Marcussen – mastering
- Rick Will – mixing

== Charts ==
Chart performance for The Prize Recruit
Chart (2001)	Peak position
Australian Albums (ARIA)	12
