= Synthetic Breed =

Australian metal band

- Origin: Melbourne, Victoria, Australia
- Genres: Progressive metal; industrial metal; groove metal
- Years active: 2002–2014
- Labels: Rogue; Symbiotic; Faultline
- Past members: Jonas Bahlo; Mark Condello; Reza Nasseri; Vincent Zylstra; Nick Bose; Daniel Luttick; Callan Hughes; Darcy Mildren; Mares Refalaeda; Luke Thiel
- Website: syntheticbreed.com

Synthetic Breed were an Australian heavy metal band formed in 2002. Their long-term members were Jonas Bahlo on bass guitar and backing vocals, Callan Hughes on lead vocals, Daniel Luttick on drums and Vincent Zylstra on lead guitar and backing vocals. They issued two studio albums, Catatonic (April 2008) and Perpetual Motion Machine (October 2010).

== History ==
Synthetic Breed originated as a four-piece industrial metal band with Vincent Zylstra and Reza Nasseri on lead guitars, Jonas Bahlo on bass guitar and Mark Condello on lead vocals. Nick Bose on drums joined and left the band a number of times, but never actually played drums live. By March 2004 Daniel Luttick became their drummer. The line up lasted two shows: after the show at EV's Metalfest, the band played one more show at the Green Room in Melbourne before Condello left the band. In October 2004 Synthetic Breed were on stage with Nasseri also on vocal duties, but on 13 April 2005 Callan Hughes joined on lead vocals for his first show with the band. Synthetic Breed supported Swedish metal group Arch Enemy on their Australian tour.

The band released their second extended play, Fractured, in November 2005. David Stonehouse of The Sydney Morning Herald, described their style as "Psychotic blasts of biomechanical fury, pulsing poly-rhythms and metronomic precision". thedwarf.com.au's Josh L observed, "While most bands would try dominating the local scene before taking on the world, Synthetic Breed seem like a band that have firmly set their goals and know what route they plan to take in order to achieve them." After an appearance at the With Full Force Festival (Leipzig, Germany) in 2006, Nasseri left and was eventually replaced by Darcy Mildren on guitar.

The band signed with Faultline Records for the release of debut full-length album, Catatonic (April 2008). Justin Donnelly of MediaSearch compared it to their earlier extended plays, "the melodic component of the songs has definitely improved, with the layered vocal performances sounding more thought out and defining, rather than simply sounding like an afterthought that counterbalances the heavier side of the band’s sound." During that year Mildren departed and the band returned to a four-piece.

Synthetic Breed released their second full-length album, Perpetual Motion Machine, in October 2010 while they were on a live performance hiatus. Buzz Magazine Australia's Rod Whitfield rated it at four out-of five stars and compared it to their previous studio album, "it's probably best to view the new record in isolation, and try your utmost not to compare... their quirky and unique trademarks are still present in droves, but the changes go beyond the mere cosmetic."

Synthetic Breed undertook the Perpetual Motion Machine tour across Australia in 2011. For the tour both Bahlo and Hughes departed and were replaced by Luke Thiel (bass guitar) and Mares Refalaeda (vocals) respectively. Refalaeda co-wrote the track, "Dimension Zero", with Luttick and Zylstra for the EP Zero Degrees Freedom, which was issued in May 2012. Whitfield, now writing for Beat Magazine, caught up with the group in early 2012, "Their lineup is solid and strong, after a period of instability, and the last twelve months has seen them sign to an American label, re-release their first two albums Stateside and traverse our mighty nation several times. The way ahead now seems very clear, and the next 12 months looks to be even more hectic for this world class Australian heavy act." In mid-2012 Thiel and Refalaeda left, and by September Bahlo and Hughes had returned.

Synthetic Breed were working on a third full-length album during 2013. However, their official website showed no new activity from early 2014. By June of that year Zylstra was working on a collaborative album, Project Rogue – Titans, seeking crowdfunding. Jonas Bahlo was teaching English and German at a secondary college in Melbourne. By 2015 Refalaeda was a singer-keyboardist for Sydney-based death metal group, Rise of Avernus.

== Members ==
- Mark Condello – vocals (2002–04)
- Reza Nasseri – guitar (2002–06)
- Vincent Zylstra – guitar, backing vocals (2002–14)
- Jonas Bahlo – bass guitar, backing vocals (2002–10, 2012–14)
- Nick Bose – drums (2002–04)
- Daniel Luttick – drums (2004–14)
- Callan Hughes – lead vocals (2005–11, 2012–14)
- Darcy Mildren – guitar (2006–08)
- Mares Refalaeda – lead vocals (2011–12)
- Luke Thiel – bass guitar (2011–12)

== Discography ==
=== Studio albums ===
- Catatonic (2008)
- Perpetual Motion Machine (2010)

=== Extended plays ===
- Synthetic Breed (2003)
- Fractured (2005)
- Zero Degrees Freedom (2012)
- Formulated Chaos (2013)

=== Live/compilation albums ===
- With Full Force 2006 - Live in Germany (2007)
- Convergence (compilation, 2011)
