= 7 Years (Superheist song) =

Single by Superheist

from the album Identical Remote Controlled Reactions
- Released: 20 May 2002
- Recorded: Early 2002
- Studio: Backbeach Studios, Rye
- Genre: Nu metal
- Length: 2:48
- Label: Shock
- Songwriters: Richard William Norton, Joseph Andrew Biro, Sean Robert P Pentecost, Fetah Sabawi, Andrew Corey Dedman
- Producers: Adam Rhodes, DW Norton

Superheist singles chronology
"Step Back/Slide" (2001)	"7 Years" (2002)	"A Dignified Rage" (2002)

Music video
- "7 Years" on YouTube

"7 Years" is the lead single by the Australian nu metal band Superheist from their second studio album, Identical Remote Controlled Reactions. It was issued on 20 May 2002 by the Pivotal Records label via Shock Records. The track was co-written by all five members, Richard William "DW" Norton on lead guitar, backing vocals; Joseph Andrew Biro on lead vocals; Sean Robert P Pentecost on drums; Fetah Sabawi on synthesisers and samplers; and Andrew Corey Dedman on bass guitar. Norton co-produced the track with Adam Rhodes at Backbeach Studios (co-owned by Norton) in Rye, Victoria. The single reached No. 29 on the ARIA Singles Chart – the group's highest peaking single.

== Background ==
In December 2001 after the departure of their founding singer, Roderick "Burger" Macleod, Superheist recruited a new singer, Joey Biro (ex—From The Inside). Following the Big Day Out festival in January 2002, the group began work on their second album, Identical Remote Controlled Reactions (September 2002).

"7 Years" was issued ahead of the album, in May 2002. The track was co-written by all five band members, Richard William "DW" Norton on lead guitar, backing vocals; Joseph Andrew Biro on lead vocals; Sean Robert P Pentecost on drums; Fetah Sabawi on synthesisers and samplers; and Andrew Corey Dedman on bass guitar.

The lyrics concern the group's first seven years together and their struggle to remain a cohesive unit. It was co-produced by Norton and Adam Rhodes at Backbeach Studios – which is co-owned by Norton – in Rye, Victoria. Biros's vocal style was similar to MacLeod's, although slightly rougher, not much time was needed for the group to adjust, except to develop a more conservative and mature sound. The single peaked at No. 29 – the group's highest charting single.

== Track listing ==
AUS CD single PIV0002

1. "7 Years" (edit) – 2:48
2. "The Karma Division" – 3:08
3. "7 Years" – 3:00
4. "Bullet" (live) – 3:44
5. "Two Faced" (live) – 3:18

== Charts ==
Chart performance for "7 Years"
Chart (2002)	Peak position
Australia (ARIA)	29
