= AIR Awards of 2020 =

Edition of annual Australian music award

- Date: 1 October 2020
- Venue: Freemasons Hall, Adelaide, Australia
- Hosted by: Jessica Braithwaite and Dylan Lewis

Highlights
- Most wins: Tones and I; Stella Donnelly; (2)
- Most nominations: Tones and I; Stella Donnelly; Julia Jacklin; Sampa The Great; (3)
- Website: Official website

The 2020 AIR Awards was the fourteenth annual Australian Independent Record Labels Association Music Awards ceremony (generally known as the AIR Awards). It took place on 1 October 2020 in Adelaide.

The nominations were revealed on 7 July 2020, consisting of sixteen categories, up four from twelve, as was the case in 2019. The four new categories were: Best Independent Pop Album or EP, Best Independent Rock Album or EP, Best Independent Children's Album or EP, and Best Independent Soul/R&B Album or EP. The award for Best Independent Hard Rock, Heavy or Punk Album was split in two, recognising Punk and Heavy separately. For the first time, the ceremony didn't include the Best Independent Artist category.

== Performers ==
- Stella Donnelly
- The Teskey Brothers
- Angie McMahon
- The Soul Movers

== Nominees and winners ==
=== AIR Awards ===
Winners are listed first and highlighted in boldface; other final nominees are listed alphabetically.

Independent Album of the Year	Independent Song of the Year
**Stella Donnelly – Beware of the Dogs**; Ainslie Wills – All You Have Is All You Need; Julia Jacklin – Crushing; Sampa The Great – The Return; The Teskey Brothers – Run Home Slow	**Tones and I – "Dance Monkey"**; Ainslie Wills – "Fear of Missing Out"; Dom Dolla – "San Frandisco"; Julia Jacklin – "Don't Know How to Keep Loving You"; Sampa The Great – "Final Form"
Breakthrough Independent Artist of the Year	Best Independent Blues and Roots Album or EP
**Tones and I**; Angie McMahon; Carla Geneve; Stella Donnelly; Vlossom	**Julia Jacklin – Crushing**; Bobby Alu – Flow; Dyson Stringer Cloher – Dyson Stringer Cloher; Paul Kelly – Live at the Sydney Opera House; The Teskey Brothers – Run Home Slow
Best Independent Children's Album or EP	Best Independent Classical Album or EP
**Regurgitator's Pogogo Show – The Really Really Really Really Boring Album**; Hillsong Kids – Songs of Some Silliness; Pevan & Sarah – Be Kind; The Vegetable Plot – Season Two; The Wiggles – Party Time!	**Richard Tognetti & Erin Helyard – Beethoven & Mozart Violin Sonatas**; Amy Dickson – In Circles; Joseph Tawadros – Betrayal of a Sacred Sunflower; Katie Noonan and Australian String Quartet – The Glad Tomorrow; Stuart Skelton, West Australian Symphony Orchestra, Asher Fisch – Tristan Und Isolde
Best Independent Country Album or EP	Best Independent Dance or Electronica Album or EP
**Charlie Collins – Snowpine**; Cool Sounds – More to Enjoy; Felicity Urquhart – Frozen Rabbit; Lee Kernaghan – Backroad Nation; Lucky Oceans – Purple Sky	**The Jungle Giants – "Heavy Hearted" (1,2,3,4am remixes)**; Flume – Hi This Is Flume; Hermitude – Pollyanarchy; Huntly – Low Grade Buzz; Sui Zhen – Losing, Linda'
Best Independent Dance, Electronica or Club Single	Best Independent Heavy Album or EP
**Dom Dolla - "San Frandisco"**; Confidence Man – "Does It Make You Feel Good?"; Flume featuring Vera Blue – "Rushing Back"; Haiku Hands – "Dare You Not to Dance"; PNAU – "Solid Gold"	**Northlane – Alien**; Alpha Wolf – Fault; Ocean Sleeper – Don't Leave Me This Way; Superheist – Sidewinder; Thornhill – The Dark Pool
Best Independent Hip Hop Album or EP	Best Independent Jazz Album or EP
**Sampa the Great – The Return**; Allday – Starry Night Over the Phone; Horrorshow – New Normal; Shadow – Cream; Tasman Keith & Stevie Jean – Evenings	**Kate Ceberano and Paul Grabowsky – Tryst**; Angela Davis – Little Did They Know; Joe Chindamo – Arias; Mike Nock, Hamish Stuart, Julien Wilson & Jonathan Zwartz – This World; Phil Slater – The Dark Pattern
Best Independent Pop Album or EP	Best Independent Punk Album or EP
**Stella Donnelly – Beware of the Dogs**; Cub Sport – Cub Sport; G Flip – About Us; Jack River – Sugar Mountain; Tones and I – The Kids Are Coming	**DZ Deathrays – Positive Rising: Part 1**; Ausmuteants – ...Present The World in Handcuffs; Dear Seattle – Don't Let Go; The Gooch Palms – III; Hexdebt – Rule of Four
Best Independent Rock Album or EP	Best Independent Soul/R&B Album or EP
**Angie McMahon – Salt**; Bad//Dreems – Doomsday Ballet; Jess Ribeiro – Love Hate; Nick Cave & The Bad Seeds – Ghosteen; Pond – Tasmania	**Caiti Baker – The Dust (Pt. 1)**; Jordan Rakei – Origin; Laneous – Monstera Deliciosa; The Soul Movers – Bona Fide; Tiana Khasi – Meghalaya
Best Independent Label	2020 Outstanding Achievement Award
**ABC Music**	**Emily Ulman**

== See also ==
- Music of Australia
