= Five Star Prison Cell =

Australian musical group

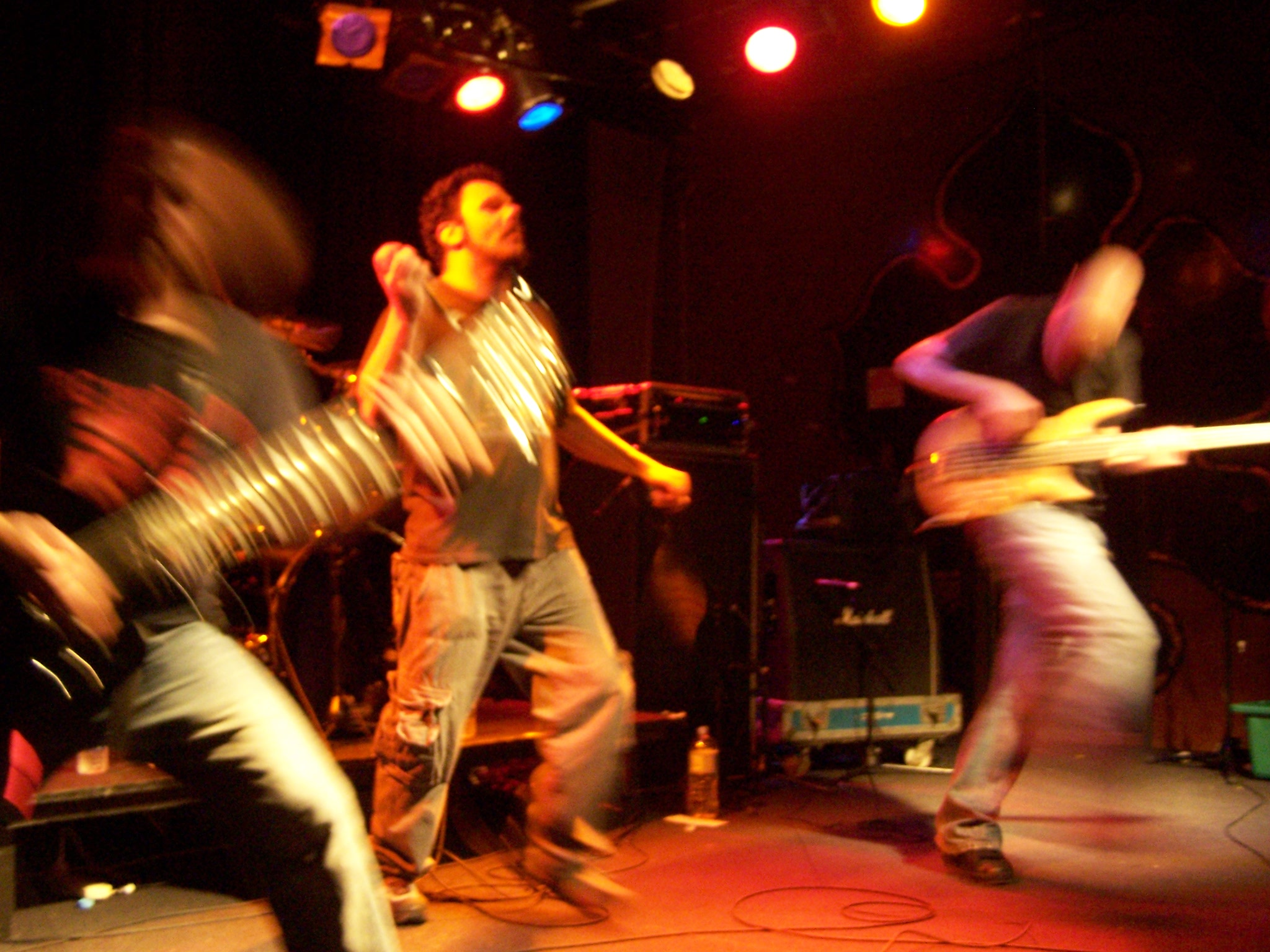
- FSPC live in Melbourne 2007

Background information
- Origin: Melbourne, Australia
- Genres: Tech metal, math rock
- Years active: 2004–2011, 2013–present
- Label: Independent
- Past members: Adam Glynn; Marek Holain; Marc Whitworth; Cameron Macdonald
- Website: Official Website

Five Star Prison Cell was an Australian four-piece band from Melbourne, Australia, whose music was generally labelled as tech metal or math rock. They were known for their use of unusual time signatures, dissonant guitar riffs, and a vocal approach that explored many different avenues and styles.

== History ==
Five Star Prison Cell was formed in 2004 by members of various other bands. Vocalist Adam Glynn came from Melbourne band Frankenbok, Marc Whitworth had played drums for Gold Coast band Tension and Cameron Macdonald and Mark Holain played bass and guitar in Extra Virgin. The group was initially conceived as a one-off studio project but after Extra Virgin disbanded it was decided to continue with Five Star Prison Cell.

In 2005, the band released its debut album The Complete First Season through Faultline Records. During the year the band toured throughout Australia and supported Arch Enemy and Spiderbait. Much of the following year was spent writing and recording another album.

On 14 November 2006, Five Star Prison Cell won the annual Musicoz award for best metal/hardcore act of 2006. A new album, Slaves of Virgo, was issued in March 2007.

Five Star Prison Cell have rigorously toured Australia and New Zealand throughout their career, and have shared the stage with many international acts including: The Dillinger Escape Plan, Danzig, Cephalic Carnage, The Black Dahlia Murder, Arch Enemy and Clutch.

In early 2010, Five Star Prison Cell completed recording their third album, titled Matriarch with Australian producer Forrester Savell (Karnivool, The Butterfly Effect, Helmet). The album was released in May and supported by a nationwide tour.

April 2011 Five Star Prison Cell decided to disband. No particular reason was provided other than wanting to focus on other areas in their lives. They remain best of friends and have left the door open to the possibility of doing another album in the future.

In 2026, Five Star Prison Cell were announced as part of the lineup for the third Necrosonic Festival, held at Mansfield Tavern in Brisbane on 22 August 2026. The festival, headlined by Rivers of Nihil (USA) and Psycroptic, featured the band as one of several "resurrected" acts performing one-off reunion sets. Vocalist Adam Glynn confirmed in an interview with HEAVY Magazine that the band had reformed specifically for the festival, noting he had also returned to Frankenbok.

== Band members ==
- Adam Glynn - vocals
- Mark Holain - guitar
- Cameron Macdonald – bass
- Marc Whitworth - drums

== Discography ==
- The Complete First Season - 2005
- Slaves of Virgo - 2007
- Matriarch - 2010

== Notes and references ==
LOUD! Magazine, issue 38, May/June 2005
