= Ted Gardner =

Australian businessman (1946/7 – 2021)

- Died: 28 December 2021
- Occupations: Artist manager, entrepreneur and company owner

Ted Gardner (1946/7 – 28 December 2021) was an Australian artist manager, entrepreneur and company owner. Gardner began his career in Melbourne in 1977, then relocated to Sydney in 1980 and on to United States from 1982. There he managed Jane's Addiction from 1989 and was co-founder of the original Lollapalooza festival in 1991 alongside Jane's Addiction frontman Perry Farrell.

== Biography ==
Gardner started as an entrepreneur in 1977 when he partnered with Michael Gudinski and Ray Evans (co-founders of Mushroom Records) to run the Bottom Line club in Richmond, Victoria. In 1980 he moved to Sydney and worked with Chris Plimmer at The Nucleus Agency, home to Midnight Oil and Matt Finish. He went on the road with Matt Finish as their tour manager.

Gardner, with Russell Deppeler, manager of Men at Work, promoted the band in support of the release of their first album, Business as Usual. In 1982, the band travelled to America and opened for Fleetwood Mac then continued touring for the next 18 months throughout the world and headlining their own US tour. In late 1983 he moved to America and in 1984 became the production manager for Frank Zappa. In the next years he worked as either the tour or production manager for: UFO, Echo & The Bunnymen, New Order, The Sugarcubes, The The, Tangerine Dream, Crowded House and Jane's Addiction.

In 1989 he became the manager of Jane's Addiction, he co-founded Lollapalooza with band members Perry Farrell and Stephen Perkins and the band's booking agents, Marc Geiger and Don Muller in 1991. He started his own management company with his wife, Nikki Brown, in 1992 and together they have managed artists such as Tool, The Verve, HUM, Colin Hay, The Geraldine Fibbers, Rival Schools, The Cramps, Queens Of The Stone Age, Anyone, Innaway, and The Brian Jonestown Massacre.

In 2007 he returned to Australia with Brown and his youngest daughter, he took a year off then started Cross Section Management and Records with Scott Mesiti based on the mid north coast of New South Wales. He handled the production for all Sand Events shows and managed Anton Newcombe and Brian Jonestown Massacre.

In 2010 Gardner took up management of Australian rock and roll band Rose Tattoo and Progressive Rock band Floating Me. He also managed Australian drummer Lucius Borich who has played in many bands and produced the bands Cog and Juice. In late 2011 Gardner began managing Melbourne artist Ezekiel Ox, taking the reins for his myriad of creative projects. In 2012 Gardner began managing Nathan Cavaleri and Col Hatchman's Stomp Blues Rock band, Nat Col and the Kings.

Gardner died on 28 December 2021 at the age of 74.
