= Superheist =

Australian nu metal band

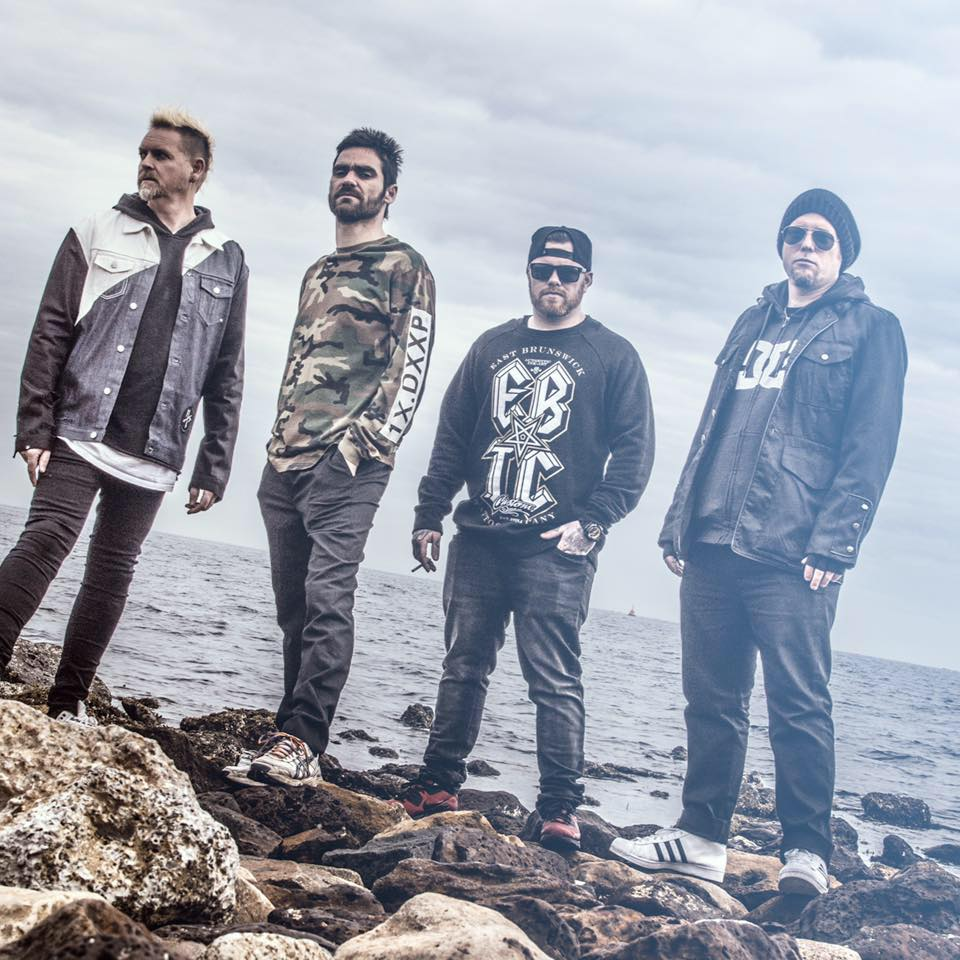
- L to R: DW Norton, Ezekiel Ox, Drew Dedman, Benny Clark; August 2016

Background information
- Origin: Melbourne, Victoria, Australia
- Genres: Nu metal; alternative metal; rap metal
- Years active: 1993–2004; 2016–present
- Labels: Independent; Warhead; Cut Throat; Shock; Shagpile; Pivotal; Dinner for Wolves; Black Mountain
- Members: DW Norton; Simon Durrant; Keir Gotcher; John Sankey
- Past members: Adam Donath; Rod McLeod; Sean Pentecost; Fetah Sabawi; Adrian Sudborough; Adam Messenger; Aaren "Suds" Suttil; Drew Dedman; Joey Biro; Ezekiel Ox; Benny Clark
- Website: facebook.com/superheist

Superheist are an Australian nu metal band formed in 1993 by mainstay guitarist and backing vocalist DW Norton. They have released five studio albums, the first two, The Prize Recruit (2001) and Identical Remote Controlled Reactions (2002), reached the top 20 on the ARIA albums chart Four singles, "Crank the System" (2000), "Bullet" (2001), "7 Years" and "A Dignified Rage" (both 2002) peaked in the ARIA singles chart top 50. At the ARIA Music Awards of 2001 their producer-engineer Kalju Tonuma was nominated for Producer of the Year and Engineer of the Year for The Prize Recruit. At the 2002 ceremony, Norton and Adam Rhodes were nominated for Engineer of the Year for "A Dignified Rage". They disbanded in 2004. After a twelve-year hiatus, Norton reformed Superheist with new members. Their third studio album Ghosts of the Social Dead (2016) reached No. 3 on the AIR Charts. They issued two non-charting studio albums, Sidewinder (May 2019) and MMXX (July 2022). Founding drummer Sean Pentecost died in 2020.

== History ==
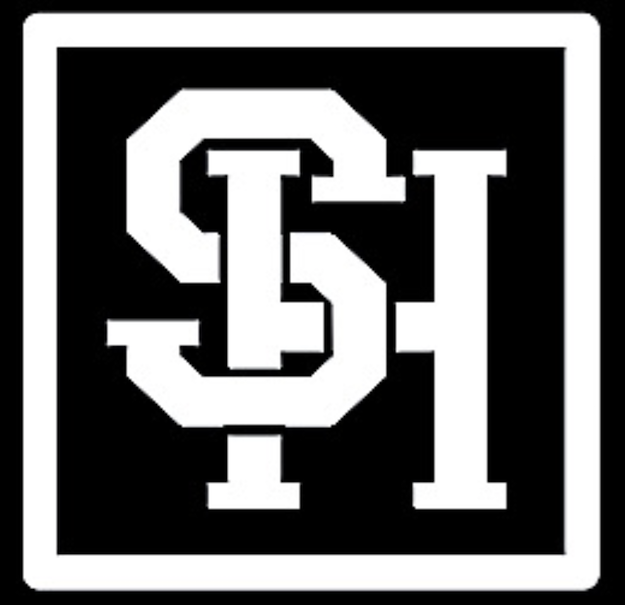
The group's logo

=== Formation and early period (1993–1996) ===
Superheist were formed in the Melbourne suburb of Frankston, Victoria in 1993. The original line-up was Rod "Berger" McLeod on lead vocals, DW Norton on guitar and backing vocals, Sean "Seanheist" Pentecost on drums, Fetah Sabawi on keyboards and samples, and Adrian Sudborough on bass guitar. The band were originally to be named Orgheist, which was inspired by European grind core bands. Their main influences were Faith No More, Fear Factory and Limp Bizkit. The name was altered to Superheist, McLeod supplied the "Super" while Norton provided the "Heist". McLeod and Norton had met at Overport primary school in Frankston, Victoria in 1980 and later attended Frankston High School together. Sabawi also attended Frankston High. Pentecost was a mutual friend who worked at a local music store, Frankston Guitar Village, and had previously played with Norton, Mcleod and Sudborough in the alt rock band Big Pop Monsters.

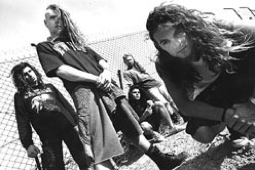
Superheist in 1994

Superheist's first live performance was at the 21st Century Dance Club, Frankston supporting the Cosmic Psychos. In 1994 they issued a five-track extended play cassette, Apocalypse, which was recorded at Backbeach Studios in Rye, Victoria with Norton producing and released independently; it was later distributed via Warhead records, The band's early style was grindcore, à la Napalm Death, with synthesiser tones, samples and clean vocals amongst brutal blast beats and death growls. The band tempered their extreme metal with pop and nu-wave melodies and hook lines.

The EP received positive reviews and the band toured nationally. Later that year Sudborough was replaced on bass guitar by Adam "Donut" Donath. They continued touring, alongside In:Extremis, Damaged and Beanflipper. Superheist became a regular on Melbourne's grind scene and played at The GB and The Hell Club. In December 1995 they performed at the annual Metal for the Brain festival, Canberra, which raised funds for the National Brain Injury Foundation. They returned for the 1996 festival, but Pentecost had already left the group due to losing interest in extreme metal. Aaren "Suds" Suttil (1974–2006) of Dreadnaught joined on drums.

=== Chrome Matrix (1997–1998) ===
In September 1997, the band signed to Melbourne's Shock Records' subsidiary label Cutthroat and released a five-track EP, Chrome Matrix. This EP demonstrated their shift from grindcore to industrial style, death metal. More samples and clean vocals were introduced with greater emphasis on keyboards and loops. The band experimented with re-mixes on "Platinum Matrix". The track "Subhuman" showcased the versatility of McLeod's vocals and clever lyrics. The EP had two hidden tracks from Apocalypse, "Retarded Barbie" and "Perfect World". During the recording Donath severed his thumb in an industrial accident and was unable to finish his parts. The remaining bass guitar parts fwere completed by Norton, while Donath recovered. Local Melbourne artist Barney "Barnaby Butters" Hughes (deceased) joined the group on bass guitar for several live shows.

More line-up changes ensued with Suttil focussing on Dreadnaught so he was replaced on drums by Adam Messenger (of In:Extremis) for live shows and recording tracks, "Times Killing" and "Pocket Full of Lies", which later appeared on a live album, New Rare Live (2004). In late 1998, Pentecost rejoined the group on drums. Their new sound continued the shift away from grindcore and industrial death metal to a nu metal. They prepared material for another EP, 8 Miles High and developed Superheist's bouncing metal sound. The post Chrome Matrix work included early versions of "Karma", "Fluid" and "Syncin' In". Chris Ainsworth (Back Beach Studios' owner Mark Rachelle's friend) temporarily provided keyboards and samples while Sabawi travelled overseas. Superheist played shows along the east coast. The band struggled to maintain audience numbers at their live shows. Also in 1998 Superheist announced Simon "Si" Durrant, of In:Extremis, as the band's bass guitarist replacing Donath, who never regained his full playing ability.

=== 8 Miles High and the beginning of commercial success (1998–2000) ===
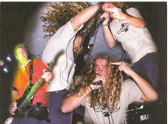
Chrome Matrix-era line-up performing

Sabawi returned to Australia in 1998 and rejoined the band. They released two singles, "Two-Faced (Check Your Head Up)" (1998) and "Karma" (1999) and performed on the Vans Warped Tour. Then they supported Fear Factory on their Australian east coast tour. In June 1999 Superheist toured nationally backing Sepultura, Durrant caused hundreds of dollars of damagein a hotel room in Brisbane. The band were investigated by Queensland Police and subsequently, Durrant left the band to return to Adelaide where he joined a short-lived project, Screwface:13. He was replaced in August by Melbourne session bass guitarist, Drew Dedman (ex Iconklast), who had met DW (by this time a studio producer) while recording bass tracks at Back Beach Recording studio. A brief East Coast and South Australian tour followed. With the band's sound changing, some fans struggled to connect with their new direction. Returning to Melbourne, they filmed their first music video for a proposed single, "Have Your Way". Although never officially released, it was distributed by Shock as promotion for the later releases.

In October 1999, Superheist recorded a cover version of "Walls" by the Flowers at the ABC studios in South Melbourne. It was featured by national youth radio station Triple J on Australian music month, in November. The group supported the Screaming Jets, returned to Canberra for Metal for the Brainh and a handful of local and east coast shows. They performed at the 1999 Falls Festival, New Year's Eve, which had them showcase their new sound to a larger audience. At Shock Records, Shagpile label was discontinued and Superheist had neither the budget nor time to record new tracks with Dedman for a full studio album, so 8 Miles High had been down to eight tracks on an EP in January 2000. Although Dedman appeared on its artwork and was credited as bass player, all the bass tracks were played by either Durrant or Norton. The track "Pulse" received airplay on Triple J and was included on a various artists' compilation album, Full Metal Racket. Also in January, Dedman joined as a full-time member providing the band's rhythm section with a better sound.

8 Miles High tracks made an impact on the Australian alternative charts, "Pulse", "Two-Faced", "Karma" and "Have Your Way" received significant airplay. This led to a support slot for Grinspoon on their Australian tour in February 2000. This tour established the band on a national level. As a result they were signed by talent manager Gregg Donovan (Grinspoon, Airbourne). "Pulse" was shelved as a single in favour of a remixed, re-released version of "Two Faced". The band had a music video filmed in Melbourne, however the single's cover used a new band logo, in the style of US nu-metal band, Limp Bizkit. This occurred without the band's permission and was removed from circulation upon the band's complaints. Superheist's relationship with Shock Records was severely tested by the label making poor decisions without consultation.

=== The Prize Recruit (2000–2002) ===
In mid-2000 Superheist members began writing and recording their debut album, The Prize Recruit (April 2001). Producer Kalju Tonuma, (Bodyjar, Hunters and Collectors, 28 Days), worked at Sing Sing Studios, Melbourne. Vocals and overdubs for the album were recorded at a beach house in Portsea Victoria. "Crank the System" was released in November 2000 as its lead single and their first on Shock Records' new subsidiary, Pivotal. It peaked at No. 45 on the ARIA singles chart. "Bullet", the second single, appeared in March 2001, which also reached No. 45. It became a popular live track for Superheist. The Prize Recruit debuted at No. 12 on the ARIA Albums Chart. A reviewer for Rolling Stone described it as "what the new heavy breed should sound like". Theprp.com website's Wookubus felt the album is "a very lush and colorful ride that the listener can figuratively slip right through, with little to no snags. Sure there are a few moments where things become a little too overtly radio friendly or sound a bit commercially focused, but with the bulk of the material included representing an eclectic blend of energetic modern metal crunch, such things are easy enough to overlook".

The album's third single, "Step Back"/"Slide" (July), had less chart success, but it reached the top 100. In August Superheist supported Eminem at his Sydney and Melbourne concerts. They played to over 25,000 people in two nights; their popularity was high and they undertook a 40 show Australian tour. At the 2001 ARIA Music Awards Tonuma was nominated for Producer of the Year and Engineer of the Year for his work on the album. In March of the following year, a Shock Records representative claimed they had spent $250–300,000 on it and despite sales approaching 35,000 units they were short of covering expenses. In mid-2001 Superheist announced their first US tour was due from late October. With US management provided by Gary Avila or Bigtime Management Paparoach, they based themselves in West Hollywood. The group performed at SIR Studios in Hollywood for record executives and journalists. The band played a tight and energetic set. Onlookers were impressed and over the next few weeks a bidding war began for a US recording deal. With commitments back in Australia, they returned home on 5 September 2001. However due to the September 11 attacks all negotiations with perspective record labels were delayed until February 2002. By then, interest in Superheist had dissipated: they had missed their opportunity.

Norton moved their sound away from "rap rock" to a more straight rock metal sound, which annoyed McLeod. McLeod distanced himself from fellow members. In a meeting with management, McLeod stated he would "only play the big shows and the band would be dropped by the record company should he decide to leave". In mid-November Superheist were due to tour with the Channel V Music Bus. The night before, the band played at Berwick youth centre. Mcleod claimed to be unwell and refused to perform, the event was sold out and other band members refused to cancel their show. They found a replacement vocalist, Joey Biro (of From the Inside). Biro pleased the crowd and band. McLeod refused to attend the Channel V Music Bus tour so Superheist invited Biro to replace him. Biro and the band toured through regional Victoria and New South Wales. Fellow band members believed that McLeod no longer shared their commitment; after consultation with management and record label, McLeod was fired and permanently replaced by Biro. In the following year, Bridget Porich of Ozmusic Central reflected on the transition, "the vocal similarity is quite outstanding and few bands manage to sustain the same amount of talent, success and fans after the change of a lead man."

=== Identical Remote Controlled Reactions (2002–2004) ===
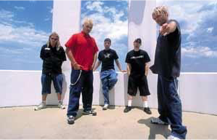
Identical Remote Controlled Reactions line-up

In 2002 Superheist played several major festivals in Australia including a main stage slot on the Big Day Out in Gold Coast, Sydney, Melbourne, Adelaide and Perth in January–February. Biro won over fans with heartfelt performances and powerful voice. The group began work on their second album, Identical Remote Controlled Reactions (September 2002). It was recorded at Sing Sing Studios with Norton, Sabawi and Adam Rhodes (Dirty Three) co-producing, which peaked at No. 20. The lead single, "7 Years", had appeared in May, which reached No. 29 – their highest-charting single. It was followed in August by a semi-acoustic rock ballad, "A Dignified Rage", which peaked at No. 50.

At the 2002 ARIA Music Awards, Norton and Rhodes were nominated for Engineer of the Year for "A Dignified Rage". The sound was generally heavier than The Prize Recruit but showed a maturity in the songwriting and playing. Biro's emotive vocal style lending to a more epic version of Superheist's bouncing heavy rock riff style. The group co-headlined the Kings of Rock Tour with New Zealand hard rockers Shihad (then-known as Pacifier). Sean Kemp of Oz Music Project described their set, "Biro (Vocals) does it better than previous front man [McLeod]. He works the crowd with more superiority, has an instinctive feel and fits in well with [Norton] who is in charge of guitar and harmonies." They played major rock festivals late in 2002, abutnd finished the year with a disppointing New Year's Eve show in Hastings, Victoria. Dedman quit the band that night and returned to his home in northern NSW refusing to speak to other members for months of 2003.

Superheist performed on the Crusty Demons of Dirt Nine Lives Tour before June 2003. In July of that year the band travelled to the US for another tour. They played shows at the Viper Room, the Roxy and several showcases but were unable to sign a major international record deal. They returned to Australia and undertook east coast tours. On 8 August they recorded a live set at the Corner Hotel, Richmond. This was released as disc two of New, Rare, Live (November 2004). Late in 2003, Superheist were dropped by Step2 Artist management. Disagreements between band members began to surface. Nevertheless, the band continued to write and record demos for the third album without a bass guitarist, Norton recorded the bass on the demos during this time. They had persuaded Dedman to rejoin and began writing and rehearsing. Superheist were billed to appear at Metal for the Brain in December, however, in October they cancelled. The band's tour of North Queensland during December and demoing tracks for their next album was taking too long. Failure to hire a new manager, inconsistent performances and tensions between Norton and Biro were problematic. Upon return to Melbourne, Biro was fired in January. More demo recording followed. In February 2004 Norton announced that Superheist had disbanded.

During their career they had achieved significant chart success with four singles appearing in the top 50 and two studio albums entering the top 20. Australian musicologist Ian McFarlane described them as "Melbourne's premier nu metal act for 10 years... [with an] extreme down-turned sound." He praised Biro on their second album, "who didn't incorporate rap into his vocal delviery", while the group delivered "cleaner (yet still heavy) alternative metal sound". Greg Lawrence of Worldwide Home of Australasian Music and More Online (WHAMMO) had described McLeod as a "lyric writer and vocalist", who "likes to party hard but who works at his craft with determination". Whereas the band delivered a "mix of hard rock, punk and edgy electro-influenced sounds".

=== New, Rare, Live and post Heist (2004–2015) ===
Norton curated a "goodbye" compilation and live album, New, Rare, Live, using previously unreleased material, recently recorded demos and a live recording. Norton added a non-band track, "The Road", which was written with Cam Baines (of Bodyjar) and Phil Rose (ex-Nursery Crimes). Baines recorded his vocals at Norton's "Cabin in the woods" in remote Victoria. It is followed by four demo tracks and some rarities including the title track of 8 Miles High, which had been omitted from the EP. In November 2004 it was issued as a 2-CD set. Artwork was by Melbourne designer Richard DeSilva who also worked on Identical Remote Controlled Reactions. Drew Dedman formed an improvised jazz band, the Lounge Machine in 2004 and played with Melbourne drum and bass act K-Oscillate in 2005–2006.

In 2006 Dedman and Norton started preparing new tracks with Matt "Skitz" Sanders from Damaged on drums, Pentecost had injured his leg and was unable to commit to recording. Three tracks were partially recorded but not finished. Another attempt at reformation of Superheist occurred in 2008 with Biro, Dedman, Norton and Pentecost rehearsing old work and jamming new material. Personality clashes, old grievances and bad timing made the reformation stall. Also in that year Biro reunited with Dedman to form metal core band, Lanstrum. They released three demo singles before separating in 2010 due to personality clashes. Norton took time out from music, retiring from studio producing in 2011 and going into business. In 2012 all five members of the Identical Remote Controlled Reactions line-up met at Norton's bar (Whole Lotta Love) in Melbourne, but once again no reformation occurred. In 2014, after a trip to Egypt, Norton returned to music: writing and recording material for a solo project Rifleman. Dedman has played with experimental electronic band XXIII and in late 2015 he joined Melbourne rocker group, the Arcane Saints.

=== Reformation and Ghosts of the Social Dead (2016–2019) ===
Superheist announced their reformation on 26 June 2016, with a third studio album, Ghosts of the Social Dead, to be issued on 28 October. Joining Dedman and Norton were former Electrik Dynamite drummer Benny Clark as Pentecost was unable to rejoin for personal reasons. In August they released the album's lead single, "Hands Up High" and related video. They revealed that Ezekiel Ox (of Full Scale Revolution, ex-Mammal, Over-reactor) as their new vocalist. The video was produced and directed by Gareth McGilvray. A second single, "Fearing Nothing", was released on 7 October, which was produced by Jay Baumgardner at NRG studios, North Hollywood. The music video was produced and directed by Brian Cox from Flarelight Films, it was shot in the Hollywood Hills.

Superheist followed with an Australian capital cities tour and filmed their third music video, "Wolves in Your Headspace" (November 2018). In early 2017 they announced new interstate shows and the artwork for their Scorched Earth national tour. In late January Clark was asked to leave and Dedman quit. Norton and Ox continued to write the band's material and their next single, "Raise Hell", was issued in February 2017. Also in that month, via the Music.com.au website, Norton and Ox announced that Durrant would resume bass guitar, joining live members Keir Gotcher (guitar) and Andy Sorenson (keyboards) on tour, to fulfill their Queensland tour dates. Two days later Superheist announced, via Facebook, that John Sankey (Devolved, Light the Torch) would be their new drummer. In April 2018 Superheist announced a Now & Then package comprising a remastered version of their demo "Apocalypse", a new six-track EP Lights and a compilation album, The History Between Us, which were released on 27 April.

=== Sidewinder, Ezekiel Ox departs, MMXX (2019–present) ===
Superheist released a new single, "The Riot" (April 2019) and had announced their fourth album Sidewinder was due on 3 May. It was issued on Norton's own label, Black Mountain Music after he recorded and mixed it at his Black Mountain Sound Studio. Sidewinder is a continuation from the "Raise Hell" release with its use of 8 string guitars. In April 2019 the line up of Durrant, Gotcher, Norton, Ox and Sankey undertook the inaugural HeistFest tour of Australia with Alaskan metalcore band, 36 Crazyfists. On 1 July 2020, Ox announced, through social media, that he had left Superheist. Founding Superheist drummer Sean Pentecost died on 18 August 2020 after some years of poor health.

In December 2020, Superheist's social media revealed a song, "Medicated", before removing it several hours later, and announced that their next album MMXX was expected in February 2021. Later in December 2020, they released a track, "Seize the Day", which was dedicated to Sean "Seanheist" Pentecost. It was provided as a free digital download on Bandcamp. It has both Norton and Durrant on lead vocals and also features former member Dedman on bass guitar. The release of MMXX was delayed until July 2022.

== Members ==
=== Current members ===
==== Studio members ====
- DW Norton – guitar (1993–2004, 2016–present); lead vocals (2020–present); backing vocals (1993–2004, 2016–2020)
- Simon Durrant – bass guitar (1997–1999, 2017–present); unclean vocals (2020–present)
- Keir Gotcher – guitar (2017–present)
- John Sankey – drums (2017–present)

==== Touring members ====
- Andy Sorenson – keyboards (2017–present)

=== Past members ===
==== Studio members ====
According to sources:

- Adam "Donut" Donath – bass guitar (1993–1997)
- Rod "Berger" McLeod – lead vocals (1993–2001)
- Sean "Seanheist" Pentecost – drums (1993–1995, 1998–2004; died 2020)
- Fetah Sabawi – keyboards (1993–1996, 1999–2004)
- Adrian Sudborough – bass guitar (1993)
- Adam Messenger – drums (1996)
- Aaren "Suds" Suttil – drums (1996–1997)
- Drew Dedman – bass guitar (1999–2004, 2016–2017)
- Joey Biro – lead vocals (2001–2004)
- Ezekiel Ox – vocals (2016–2020)
- Benny Clark – drums (2016–2017)

==== Touring members ====
- Chris Ainsworth – keyboards (1996-1998)
- Barney Hughes – bass guitar (1997)
- Richard De Silva – guitar (2016–2017)

== Discography ==
=== Studio albums ===
List of studio albums, with selected chart positions
Title	Album details	Peak chart positions
Title	Album details	AUS
The Prize Recruit	Released: 16 April 2001; Label: Pivotal Records/Shock Records (PIVOTAL0001); Formats: CD, digital download	12
Identical Remote Controlled Reactions	Released: 9 September 2002; Label: Pivotal/Shock (PIVOTAL0002); Formats: CD, digital download	20
Ghosts of the Social Dead	Released: 28 October 2016; Label: Dinner for Wolves; Formats: LP, CD, digital download	52
Sidewinder	Released: 3 May 2019; Label: Black Mountain Music; Formats: CD, digital download	—
MMXX	Released: 1 July 2022; Label: Black Mountain Music; Formats: CD, digital download	—
"—" denotes an album that did not chart.

=== Compilation albums ===
List of compilation albums
Title	Details
New, Rare, Live	Released: 15 November 2004; Label: Pivotal/Shock; Formats: CD, digital download
The History Between Us	Released: 27 April 2018; Label: Dinner For Wolves; Formats: Digital download

=== Extended plays ===
List of extended plays with selected chart positions
Title	EP details	Peak chart positions
Title	EP details	AUS
Apocalypse demo	Released: September 1994; Re-released: 27 April 2018; Label: Warhead Records/Dinner For Wolves; Formats: Cassette, digital download	—
Chrome Matrix	Released: 8 September 1997; Label: Cut Throat/Shock (CUT001); Formats: CD, digital download	—
8 Miles High	Released: 24 January 2000; Label: Shagpile/Shock (SHAGCD7048); Formats: CD, digital download	95
Lights	Released: 27 April 2018; Label: Dinner For Wolves; Formats: Digital download	—

=== Singles ===
List of singles, with selected chart positions
Title	Year	Peak chart positions	Album
Title	Year	AUS	Album
"Two Faced (Check Your Head Up)"	1998	—	8 Miles High
"Karma"	1999	—	8 Miles High
"Have Your Way"	1999	—	8 Miles High
"Crank the System"	2000	45	The Prize Recruit
"Bullet"	2001	45	The Prize Recruit
"Step Back/Slide"	2001	62	The Prize Recruit
"7 Years"	2002	29	Identical Remote Controlled Reactions
"A Dignified Rage"	2002	50	Identical Remote Controlled Reactions
"Liberate"	2003	—	Identical Remote Controlled Reactions
"The Road"	2004	—	New, Rare, Live
"Hands Up High"	2016	—	Ghosts of the Social Dead
"The Riot"	2019	—	Sidewinder
"Seize the Day"	2020	—	MMXX
"—" denotes a single that did not chart.

== Awards ==
=== AIR Awards ===
The Australian Independent Record Awards (commonly known informally as AIR Awards) is an annual awards night to recognise, promote and celebrate the success of Australia's Independent Music sector.

Year	Nominee / work	Award	Result
2020	Sidewinder	Best Independent Heavy Album or EP	Nominated

=== ARIA Music Awards ===
The ARIA Music Awards are an annual awards ceremony that recognises excellence, innovation, and achievement across all genres of Australian music. Superheist has received three nominations.

Year	Nominee / work	Award	Result
2001	Kalju Tonuma for The Prize Recruit	Producer of the Year	Nominated
2001	Kalju Tonuma for The Prize Recruit	Engineer of the Year	Nominated
2001	DW Norton, Adam Rhodes for "A Dignified Rage"	Engineer of the Year	Nominated

=== MTV Video Music Awards ===
At the 2001 MTV Video Music Awards Superheist's "Step Back" was nominated for International Viewer's Choice: MTV Australia.
