= Zero Degrees Freedom =

EP by Synthetic Breed
- Released: 29 May 2012
- Recorded: 2011
- Genres: Industrial metal, progressive metal
- Length: 23:00
- Label: Symbiotic
- Producer: Vincent Zylstra

Synthetic Breed chronology
Perpetual Motion Machine (2010)	Zero Degrees Freedom (2012)	Formulated Chaos (2013)

Zero Degrees Freedom is the third EP by Australian industrial metal band Synthetic Breed. It was released on 29 May 2012, through Symbiotic Records. Four of the five tracks are re-recorded versions of songs from their two albums Catatonic and Perpetual Motion Machine, with "Existence Mechanism" being a re-recording of "Autonomic Deficiency", plus one new track, "Dimension Zero". It is the band's only release with Luke Thiel on bass and Mares Refalaeda on vocals. Rod Whitfield wrote for Beat Magazine positively about the band and this EP.

== Track listing ==
All tracks are written by Vinn Zylstra and Mares Refalaeda (new lyrics).

No.	Title	Length
1.	"Dimension Zero"	5:24
2.	"Afflictions of Advancement"	4:16
3.	"Resilience"	4:22
4.	"Existence Mechanism"	4:32
5.	"Convergence"	4:26
Total length:		23:00

== Personnel ==
- Mares Refalaeda – vocals
- Vinn Zylstra – guitars, electronics, backing vocals, production
- Luke Thiel – bass
- Daniel Luttick – drums, percussion
