= Perpetual Motion Machine (Synthetic Breed album) =

Studio album by Synthetic Breed
- Released: 6 July 2010
- Recorded: 2009–2010
- Studios: Embryonic Studios, Melbourne, Australia
- Genres: Industrial metal; progressive metal
- Length: 55:52
- Label: Synthetic
- Producer: Vincent Zylstra

Synthetic Breed chronology
Catatonic (2008)	Perpetual Motion Machine (2010)	Zero Degrees Freedom (EP) (2012)

Professional ratings
Review scores
Source	Rating
Buzz Magazine	4.5/5
Metal.de	9/10

Perpetual Motion Machine is the second and final album by Australian industrial metal band Synthetic Breed. The album was released on 6 July 2010 under Synthetic Records. Synthetic Breed undertook a tour across Australia to promote the album in 2011.

== Track listing ==
All tracks are written by Vinn Zylstra.

Perpetual Motion Machine track listing
No.	Title	Length
1.	"Resilience"	4:20
2.	"Beyond the Sphere of Reason"	4:14
3.	"Oblivion"	6:19
4.	"Convergence"	4:27
5.	"Molecular Self Assembly"	5:03
6.	"Narcissistic Indulgence"	3:31
7.	"Scourge"	3:53
8.	"Mirrored Reflections"	6:43
9.	"Afflictions of Advancement"	6:02
10.	"The Quiescent Subject"	5:37
11.	"Reciprocated Damnation"	5:43
Total length:		55:52

== Personnel ==
- Cal Hughes – vocals
- Vinn Zylstra – guitars, electronics, backing vocals, production
- Jonas Bahlo – bass, backing vocals
- Daniel Luttick – drums, percussion
