= Severance (album) =

Studio album by Daysend
- Released: 3 November 2003
- Recorded: August 2003
- Genre: Melodic metalcore, melodic death metal
- Length: 46:30
- Label: Chatterbox Records
- Producer: Nik Tropiano, DW Norton

Daysend chronology
Severance (2003)	The Warning (2007)

Professional ratings
Review scores
Source	Rating
Lollipop Magazine	positive
Metal-Roos	positive

Severance is the debut album by Australian melodic death metal band Daysend. It was released by Chatterbox Records in Australia on 3 November 2003 and in the United States by Metal Blade and Europe by Locomotive Records in November 2004. The song "Beggars With Knives" was included on the Faultline Records compilation album Metal for the Brain 2005 in 2005. Severance took ten days to record and was produced by DW Norton and Nik Tropiano.

The album was positively received by critics.

== Track listing ==
1. "Born is the Enemy" − 5:21
2. "Ignorance of Bliss" − 4:29
3. "Blood of Angels" − 3:54
4. "Countdown" − 5:20
5. "Prism of You" − 3:40
6. "End of Days" − 4:09
7. "Severance Day" − 3:41
8. "Sellout" − 4:33
9. "September" − 4:09
10. "Beggars With Knives" − 3:04
11. "Sibling" − 4:28

== Personnel ==
- Simon Calabrese – vocals
- Aaron Bilbija – lead guitar
- Michael Kordek – rhythm guitar
- Meredith Webster – bass
- Wayne Morris – drums
