= Crank the System =

2000 single by Superheist

Single by Superheist

from the album The Prize Recruit
- B-side: "Crank the System [Fit for Mum Mix]"; "Bullet for You"; "Two Faced [live on JJJ]"; "Pulse [live on JJJ]"; "Move the Fuck Around"
- Released: 27 November 2000
- Recorded: 2000
- Genre: Nu metal, rap metal
- Length: 3:51
- Label: Pivotal/Shock
- Songwriters: Richard William Norton, Roderick McLeod, Sean Robert P Pentecost, Fetah Sabawi, Andrew Corey Dedman
- Producer: Kalju Tonuma

Superheist singles chronology
"Karma'" (1999)	"Crank the System" (2000)	"Bullet" (2001)

Music video
- "Crank the System" on YouTube

"Crank the System" is the lead single by the Australian nu metal band Superheist from their first album The Prize Recruit. It was issued ahead of the album on 27 November 2000 on Shock Records' imprint Pivotal Records. The track was co-written by all five Superheist members and peaked at No. 45 on the ARIA Singles Chart. The album and single were produced by Kalju Tonuma.

The B-side includes a grindcore version of the main song, then "Two Faced", "Pulse", "Move the Fuck Around" and "Bullet for You" – an early demonstration of the next single from the album. This song was later reworked into "Bullet".

== Background ==
In mid-1999 Superheist toured nationally backing Sepultura, but shortly their bass guitarist, Simon "Si" Durrant left and returned to his home town of Adelaide where he joined a short-lived project, Screwface:13. He was replaced on bass guitar by Andrew Corey Dedman. After the band's first EP, 8 Miles High, later works were more defined in their sound and tone – high energy and more traditional nu metal – as seen on The Prize Recruit. "Crank the System", which appeared in November 2000, was their first single with Dedman and also their first for the new Shock Records subsidiary label, Pivotal Records. The track was co-written by all five members, Richard William "DW" Norton on lead guitar, backing vocals; Roderick "Burger" McLeod on lead vocals; Sean Robert P Pentecost on drums; Fetah Sabawi on synthesisers and samplers; and Dedman. It peaked at No. 45 on the ARIA Singles Chart. The album and single were produced by Kalju Tonuma.

== Track listing ==
AUS CD single SHAGCD7052

1. "Crank the System" – 3:51
2. "Crank the System" (Fit for Mum Mix) – 3:51
3. "Bullet for You" – 4:03
4. "Two Faced" (live on JJJ) – 3:50
5. "Pulse" (live on JJJ) – 3:38
6. "Move the Fuck Around" – 0:24

== Charts ==
Chart performance for "Crank the System"
Chart (2000)	Peak position
Australia (ARIA)	45
