= DW Norton =

- Born: Richard William Norton; 22 February 1970 (age 56); Glasgow, Scotland
- Genres: Hard rock, heavy metal, alternative metal, Nu metal
- Occupations: Song writer, producer, guitarist
- Instrument: Guitar
- Years active: 1992–present

Richard William "DW" Norton (born 22 February 1970), is a Scottish-born Australian entertainer, songwriter, producer, guitarist and founding mainstay of metallers, Superheist (1993–2004, 2016–present). In 1998 he established Faultline Records – he has worked as the label's in house producer and CEO. He lives with his wife and fellow artist, London Gabraelle-Norton.

== Biography ==
DW Norton was the guitarist for Big Pop Monsters, an alternative rock group, alongside Rod "Berger" McLeod on vocals, Sean Pentecost on drums and Adrian Sudborough on bass guitar. In 1993 Norton, McLeod, Pentecost and Sudborough were joined by Fetah Sabawi on keyboards and samples to form Superheist in Frankston.

In 1998, while still a member of Superheist, Norton established an independent record label, Faultline Records, initially for development of artists. The label released Frankenbok's debut album, Greetings & Salutations, in early March 2000. He also worked as an audio engineer at Backbeach Studios, Rye.

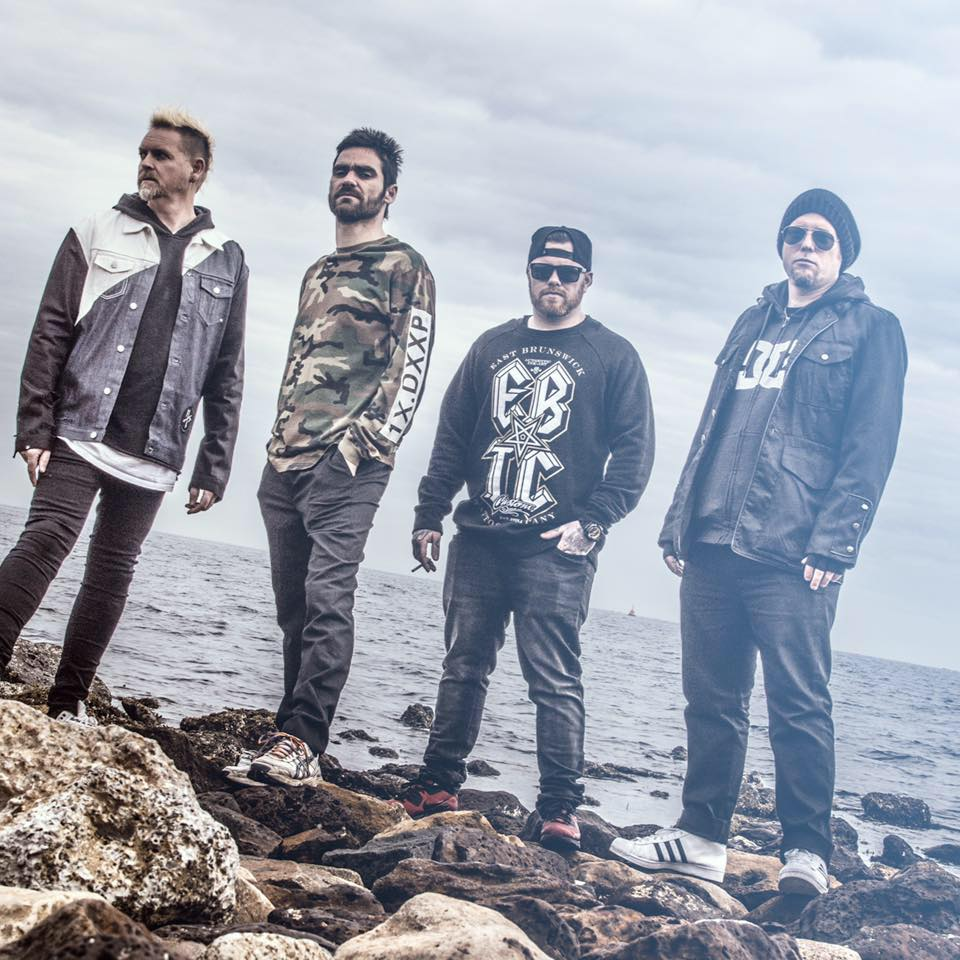
DW Norton, at left, as a member of Superheist, August 2016.

Norton was a nominee for Engineer of the Year at the ARIA Music Awards of 2002 for his work on Superheist's track, "A Dignified Rage" (August 2002). In the previous year the group's album, The Prize Recruit (April 2001), had been nominated for Producer of the Year and Engineer of the Year for Kalju Tonuma's work.

Norton explained why he was using seven-string guitars, "[it] happened when we were recording The Prize Recruit. We'd tuned down so low for so many years, and it was the first time we'd worked with a proper producer [Tonuma], who just wasn't happy with the intonation on the guitars. It wasn't perfectly in tune because the strings were too floppy, so I went with a seven-string, which is tighter." According to Rodney Holder, former member of progressive metalers Alchemist, Superheist, "went through many incarnations from extreme death metal, before finally finding commercial success in the late 1990s/early 2000s with the Nu Metal sound many fans recognise today." They disbanded in February 2004.

Norton formed an alternative grinder band, Walk the Earth, with Richard DeSilva (ex-Bison) on guitar, Sam Johnson (ex-Down to Size) on bass guitar, James Ludbrook on lead vocals, and Matt Sanders (both ex-Damaged) on drums. They issued a six-track EP, Rampant Calamities (January 2005), which Nick Lord of FasterLouder felt, "should have been a chance for the group to introduce its sound with a collection of like-minded songs, solidifying a fan base in the process. Instead, this release is confused and fragmented, each song seeming like a tug-of-war between the band’s extreme music specialists and Norton’s polished pop-sensibilities." It appeared on Faultline Records and was distributed by Shock Records.

Superheist reformed in June 2016 with a new line-up: Norton was joined by Benny Clark on drums, Drew Dedman on bass guitar and Ezekiel Ox on lead vocals (ex-Full Scale, Mammal).
