= Ghosts of the Social Dead =

Album by Superheist

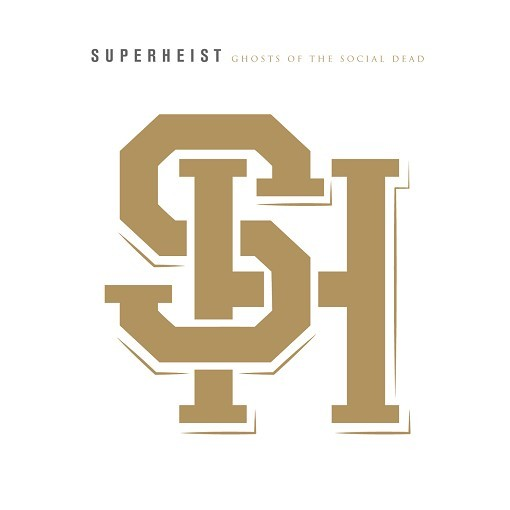
- Album cover

Studio album by Superheist
- Released: 28 October 2016
- Genre: Nu metal
- Label: Dinner for Wolves
- Producer: Jay Baumgardner

Superheist chronology
New, Rare, Live (2004)	Ghosts of the Social Dead (2016)	Sidewinder (2019)

Singles from Ghosts of the Social Dead
- 1. "Hands Up High" Released: August 2016; 2. "Fearing Nothing" Released: October 2016; 3. "Wolves in Your Headspace" Released: November 2016

Ghosts of the Social Dead is the third album from Australian nu metal band Superheist, released on 28 October 2016. The album was announced on 26 June 2016 via social media, and a music video was released for the track "Hands Up High" on the band's YouTube channel on 10 August 2016. The second single "Fearing Nothing" was released on 7 October. The third single Wolves in your Headspace and accompanying music video was released on 27 November.

== Track listing ==
All music is composed by DW Norton and Ezekiel Ox

No.	Title	Length
1.	"Wolves in Your Head Space"	4:06
2.	"Back to Base"	3:51
3.	"Fearing Nothing"	3:53
4.	"Running Away"	4:22
5.	"Flick the Switch"	4:05
6.	"The Deepend"	4:11
7.	"This Truth"	4:01
8.	"Hang Your Head"	3:29
9.	"Let's Get Out of Here"	4:04
10.	"Sweat/Swing"	3:09
11.	"Hands Up High (iTunes Deluxe Edition)"	3:15
12.	"$Laves (iTunes Deluxe Edition)"	3:28
13.	"Make Me Suffer (iTunes Deluxe Edition)"	3:20
14.	"We Are Coming (iTunes Deluxe Edition)"	3:38
15.	"Lights (iTunes Deluxe Edition)"	4:10

== Personnel ==
- Ezekiel Ox – vocals, acoustic guitar on tracks 7 and 9
- dw Norton – guitar, piano and keyboards
- Drew Dedman – bass, grand piano, synth programming on track 3
- Benny Clark – drums

Background vocals on Fearing Nothing

- Dani Raushi, Mark "Stig" Daughney, Benny, Zeke, Drew, dw, Mr.Keir & Theron

Background vocals on This Truth

- Dani Raushi, Mark "Stig" Daughney, Benny, Zeke, Matt & dw

Gang vocals

- Dani Raushi, Mark "Stig" Daughney, Benny, Zeke, Drew, dw, Mr.Keir, Theron & Harrison

Portuguese Whispers on Wolves

- Daniel Pampuri

Production work

- Jay Baumgardner – production and mixing
- Kyle Hoffmann & Daniel Pampuri – engineering
- dw Norton – additional engineering
- Theron Rennison – Pro Tools operation
- Theron Rennison, Drew Dedman & Everyone Else – Pro Tools editing
- John Ruberto – mastering

== Charts ==
Chart performance for Ghosts of the Social Dead
Chart (2016)	Peak position
Australian Albums (ARIA)	52
