= Flesh Field =

American band

- Origin: Columbus, Ohio, United States
- Genres: Industrial; Electro-industrial; Orchestral
- Years active: 1996 - present
- Labels: Metropolis; Inception; Dependent; Trisol/Matrix Cube
- Members: Ian Ross; James Francis; Mindcage Rick
- Past members: Rian Miller; Wendy Yanko
- Website: Official Website

Flesh Field is an American electronic / industrial band formed in 1996 by Ian Ross in Columbus, Ohio, United States. The name Flesh Field is an unofficial term Ian Ross came up with to describe the psychological defense mechanisms of rape victims.

== History ==
Rian Miller joined the band in 1997 to contribute female vocals. The band's debut album, Viral Extinction, peaked at #18 on the CMJ RPM Charts in the U.S. and ranked #31 on the German Alternative Charts (DAC) Top 50 Albums of year 2000. The followup EP, Redemption, peaked at #12 on the CMJ RPM Charts.

In 2004, Miller was replaced by another female vocalist, Wendy Yanko. Their 2004 album Strain peaked at number 4 on the 2005 DAC, charting for 8 weeks. In 2005, Flesh Field performed at the M'era Luna Festival in Hildesheim, Germany.

In January 2011, Ian Ross pronounced the retirement of Flesh Field as a musical project. Ross went on to further say that he will continue to make music, and that he is considering a new project. Seven of the instrumentals for "Tyranny of the Majority" were released on the official Flesh Field website mastered along with two additional untitled instrumentals that were cut from the album. Two of the album's tracks, "Swarm" and "Forgotten Trauma" can be found on the albums, Dependence: Next Level Electronics: Volume 2 and Septic VI respectively.

Flesh Field's track "Beneath Contempt" appeared in season 5, episode 8 of the HBO show True Blood.

Flesh Field released the album Voice of the Echo Chamber on November 3, 2023, and the album Voice of Reason on April 26, 2024.

Flesh Field's track "Uprising" appeared in the end credits of the Hulu original science fiction thriller film "The Mill (2023 film)" released in October 2023.

== Members ==
=== Current ===
- Ian Ross – vocals, keyboards, programming
- James Francis – keyboards, bass (live performances only)
- Mindcage Rick – guitar (live performances only)

=== Former ===
- Rian Miller – vocals (1997–2004)
- Wendy Yanko – vocals (2004–2006)
- Scott Tron/Matthias Ewald – keyboards (live performances only)
- Josh Creamer – guitar (live performances only)

== Discography ==
=== Albums ===
- Viral Extinction: Inception Records / Trisol/Matrix Cube (1999)
- Redemption EP: Inception Records / Trisol/Matrix Cube (2000)
- Belief Control: Inception Records / Trisol/Matrix Cube (2001)
- Strain: Metropolis Records / Dependent Records (2004)
- Tyranny Of The Majority: Free internet release (instrumentals only) (2011)
- Voice of the Echo Chamber: Metropolis Records (2023)
- Voice of Reason: Metropolis Records (2024)
- On Enmity: Metropolis Records / Dependent Records (2026)

=== Singles ===
- "Beautifully Violent"

=== Internet release ===
- Inferior EP: (2003)
- Conquer Me EP: (2003)

== Film, video game and television appearances ==
- Haven: Project Gotham Racing 3 (2005)
- Uprising: Crackdown (2007)
- Forgotten Trauma: Project Gotham Racing 4 (2007)
- Voice of Dissent (Remix): Trailer for The Club at the 2006 E3
- Beneath Contempt: True Blood Season 5, Episode 8 "Somebody that I Used to Know" (2012)
- Uprising: The Mill (2023 film)
