= Tyranny of the Majority (album) =

Tyranny Of The Majority

Studio album by Flesh Field
- Released: January 1, 2011
- Genre: Industrial, electronic
- Label: Self-Released
- Producer: Ian Ross

Flesh Field chronology
Strain (2004)	Tyranny Of The Majority (2011)

Tyranny Of The Majority is the fourth album by the Industrial group Flesh Field. This album was written in a time period from mid-2006 to 2009. In January 2011, it was announced by Ian that he was disbanding Flesh Field as a musical project due to difficulties to collaborate with Wendy Yanko and difficulty to finding time to devote the attention to the project that it deserves. Ian went on to further say that he would continue to make music, and is considering making music under a new project.

== Release ==
Ian has released seven of the instrumentals for Tyranny Of The Majority on the official Flesh Field website. Initially, these seven tracks were released as unmastered demos. Nathaniel of the Russian band Pheromone later decided to master the instrumental tracks. The only three tracks that weren't released on Flesh Field's official website were, "Swarm", "Forgotten Trauma", and "In Perpetuity". The reason why they were not released was because "Swarm" can be found on the album, "Dependence: Next Level Electronics Volume 2" and "Forgotten Trauma" can be found on the album "Septic VI". The status of "In Perpetuity" is currently unknown at this time.

== Track listing ==
No.	Title	Length
1.	"Let Fall The Sentinels"	6:25
2.	"Millenarian"	4:04
3.	"Forgotten Trauma"	5:25
4.	"The Vanguard Delusion"	4:58
5.	"Doragon"	5:43
6.	"L-5"	5:40
7.	"Swarm"	4:10
8.	"The Lashkar"	4:42
9.	"A New Enlightenment"	6:17
10.	"In Perpetuity"

== Additional tracks ==
In addition to the seven instrumentals that were released as unfinished tracks, two untitled instrumentals were released as well that were cut from the album.

== Personnel ==
- Ian Ross - Music, Lyrics
- Wendy Yanko - Vocals
- Nathaniel - Mastering
- Konn Lavery - Artwork
