= Apocalypse demo =

Apocalypse

Demo album by Superheist
- Released: (Australia) 1994; 27 April 2018 (Re-release)
- Recorded: Backbeach Recording studio September 1994
- Genre: Death metal
- Length: 20:26
- Label: Warhead Records (Original release); Dinner For Wolves (2018 re-release)
- Producer: Superheist and Mark Rachelle

Superheist chronology
Apocalypse (1994)	Chrome Matrix (1997)

Alternative covers
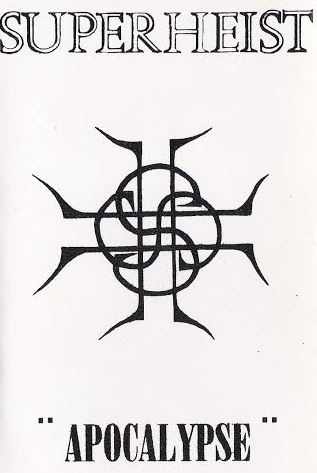
- Original Cassette cover

Professional ratings
Review scores
Source	Rating
rateyourmusic.com	"Xirtam".

The Apocalypse demo is a 5 track death metal demo and the first release by Australian nu metal band Superheist It was their rarest recording (before it was re-released in 2018), as well as their earliest and heaviest. Apocalypse was released as a demo to record companies, radio stations, and magazines in 1994, a year after the creation of the band. The demo was later remastered and re-released as a digital release on 27 April 2018.

== The recording ==
The demo was recorded in mid to late 1994 by guitarist DW Norton and producer Mark Rachelle at Backbeach studio in Rye, Victoria It was later distributed on cassette through Warhead Records. The original Superheist logo was conceived by DW Norton and additional artwork and layout done by Cam Tucker. This early recording is a good example of the extreme metal roots of a band that is mostly known for its nu-metal releases.

== Track listing ==
All music is composed by Norton and Burger.

No.	Title	Length
1.	"Retarded Barbie" (renamed "Can't Stop the Razors" on 2018 re-release)	4:42
2.	"Perfect World"	3:44
3.	"Mosaic"	5:30
4.	"Mindleech"	3:54
5.	"Apocalypse"	2:34
Total length:		20:26

(Notes) track 1 and 2 were released as hidden tracks on the Chrome Matrix EP.

== Credits ==
Superheist

- Burger - vocals
- Norton - guitar
- Donut - bass guitar
- Sean - drums
- Fetah - Keyboards

Production

- Mark, Burger and Norton - mixing
- Superheist and Mark Rachelle - producer

== Reviews ==
"The birth of Superheist! Fast & attacking metal sound right from the first beat. Heavy & in your face death growl vocals. Awesome production & tight musicianship. Featuring samples from the movie "Naked" starring David Thewlis. This debut cassette tape had a photocopied black & white cover & contained 5 tracks. Releases after this, bridged over to commercialism & it could be said even "pop" given the artwork on the cover of "The New Recruit" record. At the time of this release, Superheist were at the top of the food-chain in Australian metal. Hailing from Melbourne, this is, or was rather, a killer band which will be sorely missed. 4/5 " - Xirtam, 2009
