= Daysend =

Australian metal band

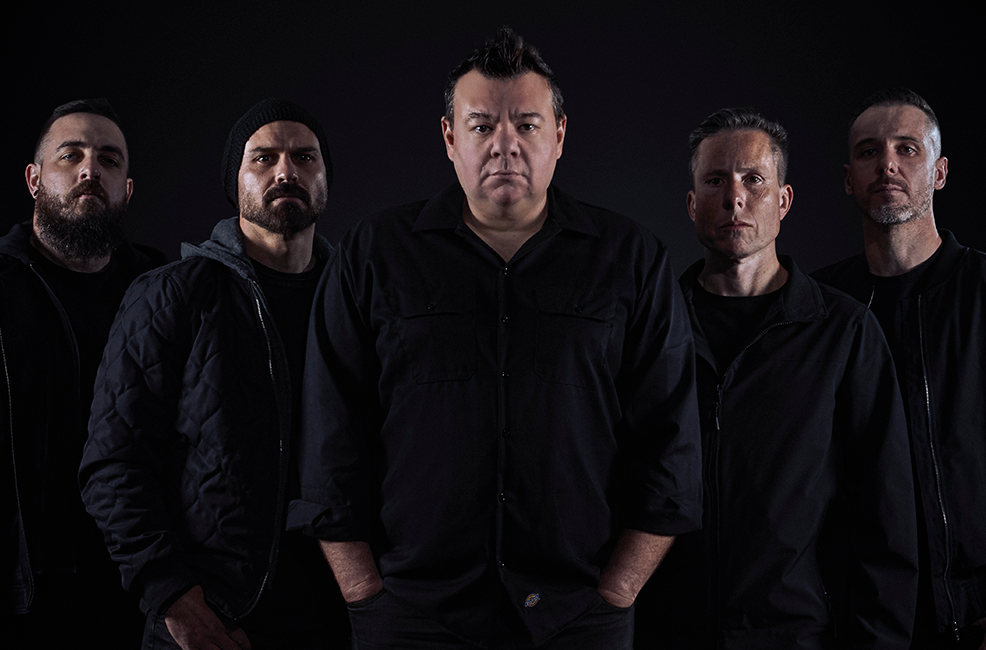
- Daysend in 2025. L–R: Jason Turnbull, Aaron Bilbija, Simon Calabrese, Michael Kordek, Mat Piccolotto

Background information
- Origin: Sydney, Australia
- Genres: Melodic metalcore; melodic death metal; thrash metal
- Years active: 2002–2011, 2025–present
- Labels: Faultline; Metal Blade; Chatterbox
- Members: Aaron Bilbija; Michael Kordek; Jason Turnbull; Mathew Piccolotto; Simon Calabrese
- Past members: Mark McKernan; Meredith Webster; Wayne J. Morris; Andrew Lilley; Dave Micallef; Matt Lamb

Daysend (pronounced days-end) are an Australian metal band, formed in Sydney in 2002 by Aaron Bilbija and Meredith Webster. They were joined later that year by Wayne Morris on drums. From 2003 to 2006 their lead vocalist was Simon Calabrese, who was replaced by Mark McKernan. The group released three albums, Severance (2003), The Warning (2007) and Within the Eye of Chaos (2010), before disbanding in May 2011. They reunited in February 2025 with a lineup of previous members and new drummer Mathew Piccolotto.

== History ==
=== Formation (2002–2003) ===
Daysend were formed in mid-2002 by Aaron Bilbija on guitars, Matt Lamb on drums and Meredith Webster on bass. All three had been members of a thrash metal band, Psi.Kore, which were founded by Lamb's brother Chuck, guitarist Adam Boyle and bassist Lex Dourian in 1996; Lamb had joined in 1997 and Webster took Dourian's place in late 1998. The band recorded an EP with Chatterbox Records in 2000 and toured Australia widely before Bilbija was recruited in early 2002. Relations within the group pushed Chuck Lamb out and the remaining members decided to continue in a slightly different musical direction. In 1995, Bilbija had formed a death metal band called Deadspawn and with the eventual line-up of himself plus Dave Micallef (vocals, guitar), Bob Latsombath (bass) and Wayne Morris (drums), that group had released an album on Warhead Records in 1999 before eventually splitting up when Micallef left in mid-2001. Bilbija now recruited Micallef into his latest band, and Daysend was formed with guitarist Michael Kordek (from a death metal act called Automation and then, briefly, Infernal Method with Bilbija) also coming into the group. The line-up was only together briefly before Matt Lamb left, his place taken by Morris. Lamb has since played in a variety of Sydney rock and metal bands.

A debut live show with Melbourne death metal band Earth was booked but Micallef quit Daysend before the show; the band played regardless as an instrumental act. Inheriting Psi.Kore's manager, Chatterbox owner Nik Tropiano, who had helped push that group to the verge of major success, Daysend was listed on the bill for the 2002 Metal for the Brain festival and slated to open for Austrian death metal band Pungent Stench shortly afterward, both without so much as having either a recording or a vocalist. However, Metal for the Brain was cancelled due to an insurance cost blow-out and Daysend had still not found a singer in time for the Pungent Stench tour. In January 2003, Simon Calabrese was recruited as lead vocalist. Calabrese had previously been with a nu metal act called Redsands that had recorded an EP before disbanding.

=== Severance (2003–2006) ===
With Calabrese in place, Daysend immediately found themselves supporting Sweden's The Haunted in March and then on a national tour with the reformed Melbourne grindcore band Damaged. After that, Daysend spent ten days recording the debut album Severance, which was released by Chatterbox in October. Severance was voted Best Australian Metal Album in a Triple J listeners poll soon after, an honour it shared with Renascent Misanthropy by Brisbane black metal band Astriaal.

2004 saw Daysend touring heavily. They supported Slipknot, In Flames, Shadows Fall and Machine Head and toured nationally with Entombed. Severance was released in the United States by Metal Blade Records and by Locomotive in Europe in November. When the Metal for the Brain festival added two extra shows in Brisbane and Perth along with its regular Canberra fixture in February 2005, Daysend appeared at each. Two days before this, however, Kordek suddenly left the band. His replacement was Andrew Lilley, who had most recently served a brief spell with Melbourne thrash band Atomizer. Lilley's addition to Daysend caused some initial surprise as he had been fired from Psi.Kore in mid-2001, then coincidentally joined Infernal Method after Bilbija had left to join Psi.Kore. However, after learning the band's entire set in one emergency rehearsal, he slotted into the Daysend line-up.

In May 2005, Daysend toured the US for six weeks with Otep. On returning to Australia, the band split with both its management and with Lilley. Michael Kordek rejoined and some work began on a second album. Further activity was stalled however when Simon Calabrese left Daysend in May 2006. Within a short time, however, ex-Headcage vocalist Mark Halcroft (McKernan) joined the band.

=== The Warning (2006–2009) ===
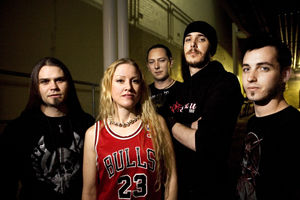
Daysend in 2009. L–R: Aaron Bilbija, Meredith Webster, Wayne Morris, Mark Halcroft, Jason Turnbull

After playing just two shows with Halcroft, Daysend began recording The Warning in November 2006 with DW Norton, who had also produced the debut. Norton signed the band to his label Faultline and the album was released on 28 May 2007 ahead of Daysend's appearance at Sydney's two-day Come Together Festival. A national tour began soon after but at least one show was cancelled when Morris received an eye injury from a broken drumstick during a show in Sydney on 13 July.

In late November 2007, Michael Kordek left the band to follow "other musical and non-musical interests". He was replaced by Jason Turnbull in late 2007, playing his first show with the band on New Year's Eve. In July 2008 Daysend then travelled to New Zealand for a small tour with Subtract. August saw Daysend play a string of shows with Perth band Dyscord, and be the direct support for Trivium's one off Australian show at the Enmore Theatre in Sydney. In October, Daysend supported renowned UK metal band Carcass at Sydney's Metro Theatre, before playing a string of New South Wales shows with Dyscord, Psycroptic and the US deathcore band Whitechapel in early January 2009.

=== Within The Eye of Chaos and split (2009–2011) ===
In mid 2009, Daysend began recording their third album as a four-piece since Turnbull had left the group. Within the Eye of Chaos was released on 19 February 2010, on the Stomp label. A national tour followed with Braithe Selby as a touring member. On 10 July 2010, the band played Utopia Records 30th Anniversary show which marked the return of Jason Turnbull to the line-up.

Daysend played only a handful of shows throughout the year. In 2011 it was announced that Daysend would be touring Australia with Nevermore in June; however, that tour was cancelled. On 5 May, Daysend announced through their Facebook page that they were disbanding: "The reason is not due to artistic differences or personal issues but rather that we feel we cannot continue with the band any longer. We would like to extend our sincerest thanks to our family and friends who have supported us over the years and most of all, our loyal fans". The announcement was carried by various Australian metal websites.

In June 2019, Daysend's full discography was added to major music streaming services.

In mid-2024, ex-Daysend guitarists Aaron Bilbija and Jason Turnbull helped reform Sydney death/thrash/groove metal band Mortality on guitars. Similarly in 2024, ex-Daysend guitarist Michael Kordek rejoined his previous band Automation, and ex-Daysend vocalist Simon Calabrese reformed his previous band Redsands.

=== Revisiting Severance and return (2025-present) ===
In February 2025, the band announced their return with original vocalist Simon Calabrese, guitarists Aaron Bilbija and Michael Kordek, ex-guitarist Jason Turnbull on bass, and former Switchblade drummer Mat Piccolotto. In June 2025, the band announced an Australian tour spanning the tail end of 2025, revisiting the Severance album.

In August 2025, the band performed a secret set at Inferno's Rock Room in Sydney under the pseudonym "Skumring".

== Members ==
Current members

- Aaron Bilbija – lead guitar (2002–2011, 2025–present)
- Michael Kordek – rhythm guitar (2002–2005, 2005–2007, 2025–present)
- Simon Calabrese – vocals (2003–2006, 2025–present)
- Jason Turnbull – bass (2025–present), rhythm guitar (2007–2010, 2010–2011)
- Mathew Piccolotto – drums (2025–present)

Former members

- Adam Nobilia – vocals (2002)
- Meredith Webster – bass (2002–2011)
- Matt Lamb – drums (2002)
- Dave Micallef – vocals (2002)
- Wayne Morris – drums (2002–2011)
- Andrew Lilley – rhythm guitar (2005)
- Mark McKernan (Halcroft) – vocals (2006–2011)
- Braithe Selby – rhythm guitar (2010; touring)

== Discography ==
- Severance (2003)
- The Warning (2007)
- Within the Eye of Chaos (2010)
