= A Dignified Rage =

Single by Superheist

from the album Identical Remote Controlled Reactions
- Released: 26 August 2002
- Genre: Nu metal
- Length: 3:19
- Label: Pivotal/Shock
- Songwriter: Biro/Dedman/Norton/Pentecost/Sabawi
- Producers: Adam Rhodes, DW Norton

Superheist singles chronology
"'7 Years'" (2002)	"A Dignified Rage" (2002)	"'Liberate'" (2003)

Music video
- "A Dignified Rage" on YouTube

"A Dignified Rage" is a song by Australian nu metal group Superheist, released as the second single, from their second album Identical Remote Controlled Reactions. It was issued on 26 August 2002 by the Pivotal Records label via Shock Records.

== Recording ==
The track's foundations were written by Dedman on a beach in Red Rock, Northern NSW and was just an acoustic idea that he and Biro jammed on from time to time. The track was overlooked during initial pre-production as it did not seem to fit with the style of the rest of the album. It was eventually taken into the studio and extra parts were co-written by all five members. Norton co-produced the track with Adam Rhodes at Backbeach Studios in Rye, Victoria.
The single reached No. 50 on the ARIA Singles Chart. The b-side of the single features a completely acoustic version of the song, the No Regrets Version, which uses the original vocal track and has Fetah playing acoustic guitar, Sean playing congas and Drew adding a more simplified bass part. It was recorded at Phat Farm studio by Adam Rhodes. It is the only Superheist track to not feature DW Norton.
The song was not to popular with many of the core fans feeling they had strayed to far into a 'made for radio' sound. The track however did expose Superheist to a whole new fanbase, with regular rotation on commercial radio stations in Australia. The track has always had either a love it or hate it relationship with the fans and the band members.

== Track listing ==
All music is composed by Superheist.

Australian CD single (PIV0003)
No.	Title	Length
1.	"A Dignified Rage"	3:19
2.	"A Dignified Rage" (No Regrets Acoustic Version)	3:20
3.	"Salt in the Wounds"	3:05
Total length:		9:44

== Personnel ==
Superheist

- DW Norton – seven-string guitars
- Fetah Sabawi – keys and tech, acoustic guitar on track 2
- Seanheist – drums, congas and percussion on track 2
- Drew Dedman – six-string bass guitar
- Joey Biro – vocals

Production

- Produced by Adam Rhodes and DW Norton, teach 2 produced by Adam Rhodes
- Engineered by Adam Rhodes and DW Norton
- Recorded at Backbeach Recording Co. Rye, VIC, AU
- Tracks 2 additional recording at Phat Farm, Narre Warren, VIC
- Mixed at Sing Sing by Adam Rhodes and DW Norton
- Additional engineering Richard Stolz, Chris Dickie and Forrester Savell
- Assistant engineers Dan Reymer, Shae Mete, Action Sam and Jimi Maroudas
- Co-produced by Superheist
- Mastered by John Ruberto @Crystal Mastering, Melbourne
- Artwork and design by Richard De Silva/Define74

== Charts ==
Chart performance for "A Dignified Rage"
Chart (2002)	Peak position
Australia (ARIA)	50
