= Step Back/Slide =

"Step Back" / "Slide"

Single by Superheist

from the album The Prize Recruit
- Released: 2 July 2001
- Genre: Nu metal
- Length: 3:01 / 3:06
- Label: Pivotal/Shock
- Songwriters: Richard William Norton, Roderick McLeod, Fetah Sabawi
- Producer: Kalju Tonuma

Superheist singles chronology
"'Bullet'" (2001)	"Step Back" / "Slide" (2001)	"'7 Years'" (2002)

Alternative cover
- Back cover ["Slide"]

Music video
- "Step Back" on YouTube

"Step Back" / "Slide" is a double A-side single by Australian nu metal group, Superheist from their debut album, The Prize Recruit. Both tracks were co-written by Richard William "DW" Norton on lead guitar and backing vocals; Roderick "Burger" McLeod on lead vocals; and Fetah Sabawi on synthesisers and samplers. It had less chart success than the previous two singles, although it reached the top 100 on the ARIA Singles Chart. The album, including both tracks, was produced by Kalju Tonuma. The cover was a cardboard sheath over a jewel-case CD featuring a flip style alternative cover with concept art for the two A-sides. Only "Step Back" was provided with promotional music video.

== Track listing ==
- AUS CD single PIV0001
1. "Step Back" (edit) – 3:01
2. "Slide" (edit) – 3:06
3. "When the Smoke Clears" – 1:58
4. "Unlearn" (live) – 2:53
5. "Pulse" (live) – 3:31

== Charts ==
Chart performance for "Step Back"/"Slide"
Chart (2001)	Peak position
Australia (ARIA)	62
