= Strain (album) =

Studio album by Flesh Field
- Released: November 8, 2004
- Recorded: 2003–2004
- Genre: Industrial; Electronica; Orchestrated
- Label: Metropolis Records; Dependent Records
- Producer: Ian Ross

Flesh Field chronology
Belief Control (2001)	Strain (2004)	Tyranny of the Majority (2011)

Strain is the third studio album by American industrial group, Flesh Field, which was released on November 8, 2004, on Metropolis Records. This is not only Flesh Field's debut album on Metropolis Records, but this is also their first album that features the vocals of Wendy Yanko after the departure of Rian Miller.

== Track listing ==
No.	Title	Length
1.	"Uprising"	6:03
2.	"Haven"	5:41
3.	"Reflect The Enemy"	5:57
4.	"The Eucharist"	4:57
5.	"Recoil"	5:26
6.	"Seethe"	4:23
7.	"Voice Of Dissent"	5:52
8.	"Beneath Contempt"	3:36
9.	"Amoeba"	5:11
10.	"The Collapse"	4:30
11.	"Epiphany"	5:53
12.	"This Broken Dream"	7:16

== Personnel ==
- Ian Ross - All instruments, songwriting, mixing
- Wendy Yanko - Vocals
- Ted Phelps - Mastering, guest vocals on "Voice of Dissent"
- Josh Creamer - Guitar on "This Broken Dream"
- James Stepp - Bass guitar on "This Broken Dream"
- Margaret Faye - Female backing vocals on "Haven", "Amoeba", and "Epiphany"
- Switch - Album artwork
