= Dreadnaught (band) =

Australian metal band

- Origin: Melbourne, Australia
- Genres: Thrash metal, progressive metal
- Years active: 1992–present
- Label: Dark Carnival/Roadrunner
- Members: Greg Trull; Richie Poate; Scott Anning; Tom Joyce; Mark Kelson
- Past members: Damon Alcock; Andrew Livingstone-Squires; Aaren 'Suds' Suttil; Sandy Bettanay; Matt Racovalis; Marty O'Shea; Andy McDougall
- Website: https://dreadnaught.band

Dreadnaught is a metal band from Melbourne, Australia. The group was formed out of the remnants of some Tasmanian bands including Fridge from Launceston who recorded an album in 1994.

The band recorded a single titled Flowers in 1995 that was released on cassette by Melbourne label Subversive. The following year the full-length album Body.Blood.Skin.Mind saw release on Deported. This album displayed a combination of dark, introspective rock and melodic, progressive thrash metal. Citing a breach of contract from the label that stemmed from inadequate promotion, Dreadnaught had the album re-released on BlahBlahBlah Records in 1997.

In the meantime, the band was forced to change the spelling of its name from the original "Dreadnought" to the current affectation when it was discovered that Queensland finance company Dreadnought Finance held a trademark on the name. The independently released EP Idiosyncrasy appeared in 1998 and at approximately the same time, drummer Aaren Suttil (aka Suds) formed a thrash metal band called Atomizer while still remaining a member of Dreadnaught.

During 1999, Dreadnaught began touring more widely, supporting Cathedral, Pitchshifter and Nevermore on Australian tours. The band also signed to Roadrunner Records through what was at the time an Australian-based development roster called Dark Carnival. Dreadnaught's first album release for the label was 2000's Down to Zero. The style of music on the album was less progressive and with more of a rock feel. Shortly after its release, bass player Andy Livingston-Squires (aka Squiz) left the band. He was replaced by Ando McDougall; in the interim, Dreadnaught recorded an EP in early 2001 called One Piece Missing with Michael Meagher on bass. A national tour was mounted with fellow Dark Carnival signing Frankenbok. This was followed by tours with Devin Townsend and Nickelback later the same year.

Dreadnaught was less active nationally for the next two years before beginning work on the third full-length album in 2004. Almost immediately, Suttil resigned from the group in order to concentrate on his other band Atomizer and he was replaced by Sandy Bettenay. Suttil recorded three albums and a number of singles and EPs with Atomizer until his death on 27 December 2006.

Dreadnaught's third album was released by Roadrunner in late 2005. Dirty Music showed that the group's transformation from progressive metal to groove rock was complete. The band supported Testament's tour of Australia in early 2007. Matt Racovalis (ex-Alarum, ex-The Berzerker) replaced Sandy Bettenay on drums in 2008. In mid-2009, the band issued their self-titled fourth album, which was a return to the heavy metal, progressive metal style from the early albums. The self-titled LP was released in Japan on Soundholic, and independently in Australia, which was followed with a Japanese tour later that year. The Japanese release also contained most of the Idiosyncracy EP as bonus tracks.

Dreadnaught toured Australia with Testament again during 2010.

Marty O'Shea replaced Matt Racovalis as drummer in 2012.

2016 saw the release of Caught The Vultures Sleeping (LP).

== Members ==
=== Current members ===
- Greg Trull – vocals (1992–present)
- Richie Poate – guitars (1992–present)
- Scottie Anning – guitars (2017–present)
- Tim Joyce – drums (2019–present)
- Joey Inturrisi - bass (2026–present)

=== Former members ===
- Damon Alcock – guitars (1992–2016)
- Andrew Harold Livingstone-Squires – bass (1992–2000)
- Aaren Sutti – drums (1992–2004; died 2006)
- Sandy Bettenay – drums (2004–2008)
- Matthew Racovalis – drums (2008–2012)
- Marty O'Shea – drums (2012–2019)
- Andy McDougall – bass (2001–2022)
- Mark Kelson - bass (2022–2026)

== Discography ==
Studio albums

- Body.Blood.Skin.Mind (1996)
- Down to Zero (2000)
- Dirty Music (2005)
- Dreadnaught (2009)
- Caught the Vultures Sleeping (2016)
- Shutdown in a Heartbeat (2025)

Extended plays

- Flowers (cassette 1994)
- Idiosyncrasy (1998)
- One Piece Missing (2001)
