= Recoil (rheology) =

Recoil is a rheological phenomenon observed only in non-Newtonian fluids that is characterized by a moving fluid's ability to snap back to a previous position when external forces are removed. Recoil is a result of the fluid's elasticity and memory where the speed and acceleration by which the fluid moves depends on the molecular structure and the location to which it returns depends on the conformational entropy. This effect is observed in numerous non-Newtonian liquids to a small degree, but is prominent in some materials such as molten polymers.

== Memory ==
The degree to which a fluid will “remember” where it came from depends on the entropy. Viscoelastic properties in fluids cause them to snap back to entropically favorable conformations. Recoil is observed when a favorable conformation is in the fluid's recent past. However, the fluid cannot fully return to its original position due to energy losses stemming from less than perfect elasticity.

Recoiling fluids display fading memory meaning the longer a fluid is elongated, the less it will recover. Recoil is related to characteristic time, an estimate of the order of magnitude of reaction for the system. Fluids that are described as recoiling generally have characteristic times on the order of a few seconds. Although recoiling fluids usually recover relatively small distances, some molten polymers can recover back to 1/10 of the total elongation. This property of polymers must be accounted for in polymer processing.

== Demonstrations of Recoil ==
When a spinning rod is placed in a polymer solution, elastic forces generated by the rotation motion cause fluid to climb up the rod (a phenomenon known as the Weissenberg effect). If the torque being applied is immediately brought to a stop, the fluid recoils down the rod.

When a viscoelastic fluid being poured from a beaker is quickly cut with a pair of scissors, the fluid recoils back into the beaker. When fluid at rest in a circular tube is subjected to a pressure drop, a parabolic flow distribution is observed that pulls the liquid down the tube. Immediately after the pressure is alleviated, the fluid recoils backward in the tube and forms a more blunt flow profile. When Silly Putty is rapidly stretched and held at an elongated position for a short period of time, it springs back. However, if it is held at an elongated position for a longer period of time, there is very little recovery and no visible recoil.
