= Within the Eye of Chaos =

Studio album by Daysend
- Released: February 19, 2010
- Recorded: October–November 2009, The Grove Studios, Ourimbah, New South Wales, Australia
- Genre: Melodic metalcore, melodic death metal
- Length: 42:30
- Label: Stomp
- Producer: Darren "jENK" Jenkins and Aaron Bilbija

Daysend chronology
The Warning (2007)	Within the Eye of Chaos (2010)

Professional ratings
Review scores
Source	Rating
Blistering	8/10
The Metal Forge	8/10

Within the Eye of Chaos is the third full-length studio album by the Australian melodic death metal band Daysend, released on Feb 19, 2010 by Stomp Entertainment.

== Track listing ==
1. "See You in My Nightmares" – 4:30
2. "Mindless" – 2:51
3. "The Coldest of Disasters" – 4:21
4. "Questions" – 3:53
5. "Simple Minds" – 4:31
6. "Without Tears" – 2:06
7. "In This Moment" – 5:10
8. "Acid Laced Fiasco" – 4:07
9. "Down This Hole" – 4:15
10. "Edge of the Line" – 4:30
11. "Recoil" – 2:15

== Personnel ==
- Mark Halcroft (McKernan) − vocals
- Aaron Bilbija − guitar
- Meredith Webster − bass
- Wayne Morris − drums
