= Juliet Stillman Severance =

American physician

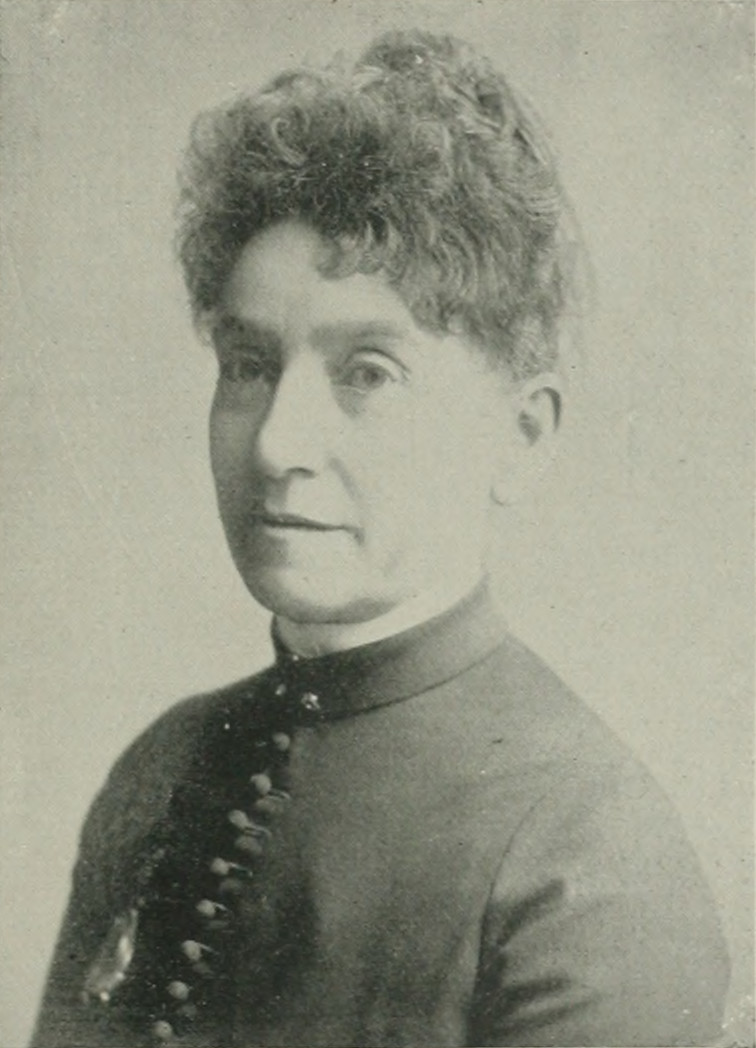
"A Woman of the Century"

Juliet Hall Worth Stillman Severance (1 July 1833 in De Ruyter, Madison County, New York – 3 September 1919 in New York City) was an American physician and feminist of the 19th century.

== Biography ==
Julie H. Severance married twice and had three children. She is a relative to abolitionist and suffragist Lucretia Mott.

She was one of the first woman physicians of the United States, having graduated in 1858 from Russell Trall’s Hygeio-Therapeutic College in New York. Severance later moved to Whitewater, Wisconsin where she opened her medical practice.

She opposed slavery, death penalty and abortion and supported the temperance movement. She was the leader of several Labour organizations. She participated in several anti-slavery, water-cure, dress reform, and dietary reform movements. In the biographical dictionary Women of the Century (1893), she is called "a radical of the radicals" and also "a model mother and a housekeeper".

She campaigned for women rights and the right to life of the unborn child, believing that marriage and motherhood should be affirming choices for women. In her article, "Is the Present Marriage System a Failure?", published in the progressive Chicago newspaper Universe on 28 August 1869, she states: "Marriage should be a soul-union, not a curse ... not a merging of one life into another, but ... two individuals uniting their lives for mutual good and the good of humanity — it may be in reproduction, or it may be in giving birth to higher, nobler ideas, and outworking them in noble deeds and grand achievements .... There is not a child in a hundred that is begotten with the consent of the mother. As the present marriage system makes man the owner of woman — her legal master — she is expected to submit to his gratification .... When the marriage system is what it should be, and woman controls in these matters, instead of man ... Restellism [abortion] shall cease, because there will be no demand for it."

== Works ==
Her works centered around the idea of marriage equating a form of slavery, the women's rights to take control of their health and the ideology that men should be held at the same standard as women.

- A Lecture on Industrial and Financial Problems (1881)
