= Bullet (Superheist song) =

Single by Superheist

from the album The Prize Recruit
- Released: 5 March 2001
- Recorded: 2000
- Genre: Nu metal
- Length: 3:38
- Label: Pivotal/Shock
- Songwriters: Richard William Norton, Roderick McLeod, Fetah Sabawi
- Producer: Kalju Tonuma

Superheist singles chronology
"Crank the System" (2000)	"Bullet" (2001)	"Step Back/Slide" (2001)

Music video
- "Bullet" on YouTube

"Bullet" is the second single from the debut album The Prize Recruit, by Australian nu metal group Superheist. It is a reworked version of "Bullet for You", a B-side from the previous single "Crank the System". It exceeds the original in quality and bombast. "Bullet" which was co-written by band members, Richard William "DW" Norton, Roderick "Burger" McLeod, and Fetah Sabawi. climbed to No. 45 on the ARIA Singles Chart. The album and single were produced by Kalju Tonuma

== Background ==
In mid-1999 Superheist toured nationally backing Sepultura, but shortly their bass guitarist, Simon "Si" Durrant left and returned to his home town of Adelaide where he joined a short-lived project, Screwface:13. He was replaced on bass guitar by Andrew Corey Dedman. "Crank the System", which appeared in November 2000, was their first single with Dedman and also their first for the new Shock Records subsidiary label, Pivotal Records. The release included "Bullet for You" as a B-side which was co-written by Richard William "DW" Norton on lead guitar, backing vocals; Roderick "Burger" McLeod on lead vocals; and Fetah Sabawi on synthesisers and samplers. This version was reworked and issued as the album's second single, "Bullet". It peaked at No. 45 on the ARIA Singles Chart. The album and single were produced by Kalju Tonuma.

== Track listing ==
AUS CD single SHAGCD7053

1. "Bullet (edit) – 3:38
2. "Powderburns" – 3:54
3. "Stigma" – 4:07
4. "Christine" – 4:17
5. "Bullet" (album version) – 3:52

== Charts ==
Chart performance for "Bullet"
Chart (2001)	Peak position
Australia (ARIA)	45
