= Faultline Records =

Faultline Entertainment Group
- Founded: 1998
- Founder: dw Norton
- Distributor(s): Stomp Distribution
- Genre: Metal, hard rock
- Country of origin: Australia
- Location: Melbourne
- Official website: faultlinerecords.com.au

Faultline Entertainment Group also known as Faultline Records is an Australian independent record label based in Melbourne. It was founded in 1998 by metal music producer, dw Norton, and began as a development label. As of 2007 it has taken on partners Richard De Silva and Gary Buckley to become a full-time independent record label within Australian and Overseas. Faultline Entertainment Group has opened an office in Florida and in the near future will be opening offices in the UK and Japan. Distribution for Faultline releases within Australia are handled by both Shock Records and MGM Distribution.

Faultline artist, Daysend, were signed and distributed by Metal Blade Records in the US. In 2008 the label won a National Musicoz Award for Best Metal or Hardcore Artist, for Gasma, from Australasian Performing Right Association (APRA).

== Artist roster ==
- Daysend
- Five Star Prison Cell (2005–07)
- Head Inc
- Noir Macabre
- Antonamasia
- Walk the Earth
- Exit Wounds
- Burns Unit
- Synthetic Breed
- Still Life Projector
- Sëbasröckets (2004–06)

== Staff ==
- dw Norton – Head of A&R, CEO
- Richard De Silva – Marketing Director
- Gary Buckley – General Manager

== See also ==
- List of record labels
