= Ezekiel Ox =

Australian singer

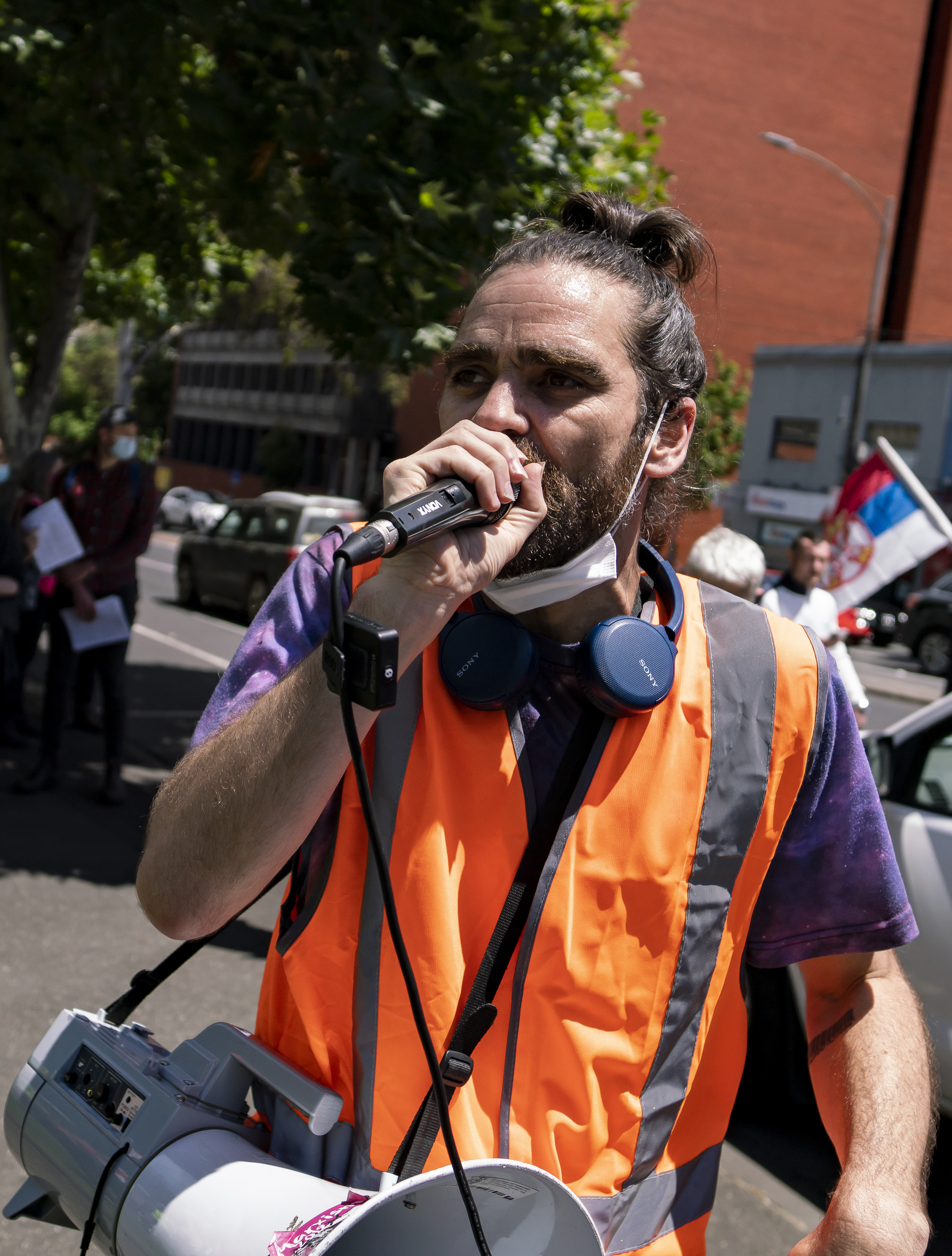
- Ox performing at an anti-fascist rally in Melbourne in 2021

Background information
- Born: Alan James Davies; 1980 (age 45–46); Colac, Victoria, Australia
- Genres: Hard rock, funk, alternative metal, musical theatre, folk
- Occupations: Singer, songwriter, actor, political activist
- Years active: 1998–present
- Website: ezekielox.com

Ezekiel Ox (born Alan James Davies; c. 1980) is an Australian musician. He is currently the singer for Mammal, Ezekiel Ox & The Evidence, Full Scale, and Over-Reactor. He was previously the singer of The Ox and The Fury, Superheist, and The Nerve. He is currently enrolled in his last year of the Juris Doctor programme at the University of Newcastle, NSW, Australia, and volunteering at the Aboriginal Legal Service, Newcastle.

== Early life ==
Born Alan James Davies in Colac, Victoria, he relocated to Geelong at age six. He has a background in opera and musical theatre and studied for three years at Western Australian Academy of Performing Arts in its musical theatre course. He starting performing at the age of twelve, "because I wanted to".

== Music career ==
=== Full Scale ===
Ox was the lead singer for punk rock/alternative-metal band Full Scale. Starting out as Full Scale Deflection in 1998 in Perth, Western Australia, Full Scale relocated to Melbourne in 2001, then they were based in Los Angeles, United States, from late 2003. After a series of EPs they released their full-length debut, Full Scale, in March 2005 and broke up a year later after touring the United States for six months. Ox re-formed Full Scale under the name Full Scale Revolution in December 2009 with Crutey, Tristan Ross and Ben Brennan, who had all played with Full Scale at different times, but not together. Ox and original FSD guitarist Jimmy Tee have begun writing new songs, with Leigh Miller. Recently, Jimmy Tee has taken on the producer role, and Ezekiel Ox is in conversation with Jay Baumgardner about mixing. There are plans for Ezekiel to fly to Perth in 2023 to perform live and record vocals for the new album.

=== Mammal ===
Ox formed Mammal in Melbourne in March 2006, with guitarist Pete Williamson (formerly part of Pete Murray's touring band), bassist Nick Adams, and former Jika drummer Zane Rosanoski. They released one studio and two live albums. Mammal broke up on 1 November 2009, but have since reformed and are playing shows again in 2017. Since reforming the band has released five new songs. In order, they are: "Community", "Virtue Signaling", "Dead", "Crime Scene" and "The War", the last two mentioned hailing the introduction of Kade Turner on bass guitar. The band is currently working on 17 songs for their second studio album.

=== Solo ===
In 2003 Ox released an EP called Winter in Suburbia. It featured seven tracks, most were Ox on acoustic guitar with some backing vocals and occasional percussion. One track, "The Bottle", featured Clint Boge (The Butterfly Effect) on lead vocals, with Ox providing backing vocals and guitar. The song's lyrics showed a more introspective persona for Ox, probably due to the divorce he was going through when he recorded it (though a few did feature politically/socially inspired lyrics). He occasionally does live solo performances, at which he performs a cover of Bob Dylan's "Masters of War", as well as songs also performed by him and the Fury. From 2014, he has a brand new solo show – a cyber-cabaret – with a loop station, his voice and a guitar. He has also taken to the streets to busk his show on the streets to the people of Australia. In November 2011, he signed with Cross-Section Management (Ted Gardner and Scott Mesiti), but moved to Pricewar Music Management (Tim Price – Sydonia, The Blackwater Fever) in 2013. He was fully independent from record labels from 1 November 2009 until May 2013, when The Nerve signed with Sydney's Birds Robe Collective. His first single "The Past, Present and Future" was released in early 2014, and received airplay on Triple J's Hip Hop Show. Ox released the EP Raw Styles in 2014 via Bird's Robe Records, followed by a tour of Australia. In 2016, Ox announced a three date solo rock tour, with full band, in Newcastle, Sydney and Melbourne, in late November. His debut solo rock band included Drew Goddard, guitar player from Karnivool.

=== The Ox and the Fury ===
The Ox and the Fury
- Origin: Melbourne, Victoria, Australia
- Genres: Folk, acoustic, alternative rock
- Years active: 2008–present
- Members: Ezekiel Ox; Lucius Borich; Ben Brennan; Dom Italiano
- Website: theoxandthefury.com

Ox formed The Ox and the Fury (initially known as Ezekiel Ox and the Fury) in Melbourne in 2008. The band comprised Ox on lead vocals and acoustic guitar, Lucius Borich (from bands Cog, Juice, The Hanging Tree, Borich x Borich and Floating Me) on drums, Ben Brennan, Natalie K Marsland and Dom Italiano.

Their debut album, Guitars Die in Hot Cars was released in April 2010. As from May that year they had a weekly residency at the Espy.

Another album was planned for release in late 2010, but did not appear, likely due to Ox's commitment to his new project Over-Reactor. In September 2011 the Ox and the Fury played a gig in Wollongong to support Rock the Vote, and Dallas Frasca sang with the band.

=== Over-Reactor ===
Over-Reactor is a 'band' made up of two members, singer Ezekiel Ox and multi-instrumentalist Cory Blight. They have released two full-length albums. A third album called Cocaine Headdress is to be released in July 2017 through Bird's Robe Records. It took 6 years for the duo to complete this album.

=== The Nerve ===
Ox formed rock band The Nerve with Borich, Davarj Thomas, and Glenn Proudfoot. In 2013 they signed with Bird's Robe Records releasing an album called Audiodacity later that year.

== Other work ==
Ox performed a series of spoken word shows called RANT! in 2006 and then BLOWTORCH in 2012. He has appeared in plays and musicals such as Tartuffe, Mamma Mia! and Shane Warne: The Musical. He has authored one self-published book, The Pub. Ox was the subject of David Krebelj's documentary, Colour, Light, Movement, Sound, which described his career in Full Scale. He has directed his own film clips, as well as co-directing the short The Boy (with Krebelj). Ox acted in feature films Blockhouse Blues and the Elmore Beast (2011) and The Real Thing.

=== Political activism ===
Ox is a former member of both the Australian Labor Party and Socialist Alternative. In 1994 he was involved in the campaign to stop the One Nation party forming in Geelong, and also marched for teachers' conditions, and in the Reclaim the Night Rallies held in his teenage years. Ox is a prominent speaker at rallies against racism and is often interviewed by mainstream print and television news as a spokesperson for various social justice campaigns. He has been involved in fund raising for Community Legal Centre funds, as well as No Room For Racism. He has debated the Deputy Commissioner of Victoria Police Andrew Crisp on National Youth Radio Station JJJ. He was a founding member of the committee for Musicians Against Police Violence (MAPV) and COPWATCH in Melbourne.

== Discography ==
with Full Scale

- Full Scale (2005), Columbia

with Mammal

- Mammal (EP) (2006)
- Vol 1: The Aural Underground (2007)
- Vol 2: Systematic/Automatic
- The Majority (2008), Shock

The Ox and the Fury

- Guitars Die in Hot Cars (April 2010)
1. "Easy" - 4:16
2. "Lifetimes" - 5:05
3. "Christmas in California" - 4:54
4. "Worried" - 3:38
5. "The 35th of May" - 4:06
6. "Satellites" - 3:28
7. "Those Words" - 3:21
8. "We'll Never Know" - 4:41
9. "Doorlist Miracles" - 4:04
10. "Machines" - 3:56
11. "Evolving" - 5:01
