= Mammal (disambiguation) =

A mammal is a vertebrate animal with milk-producing glands.

Mammal, Mammals or Mammalia may also refer to:

== Music ==
- Mammal (band), an Australian rock/metal group
  - Mammal (EP), their debut EP
- The Mammals, an American folk rock band
- Mammal (album), by Irish metal band Altar of Plagues
- "Mammal", a song on Apollo 18 (album) by They Might Be Giants
- Mammalia, Comparative Anatomy's debut album

== Other media ==
- Mammal (film), a 2016 Irish film
- Mammals (play), by Amelia Bullmore
- Mammals (TV series), a 2022 British Amazon-produced comedy
- Mammals (2024 TV series), a BBC nature documentary series
- "Mammals" (Life), a 2009 TV nature documentary episode

== See also ==
- Mamal
