= Full Scale =

Full Scale may refer to:

- Full scale, the maximum amplitude a measurement device or an electronic audio system can present

== Music ==
- Full Scale (band), an Australian alternative metal band formed in Perth, Western Australia
- Full Scale (album), the self-titled 2005 album by Full Scale
- Full Scale (EP), a 1998 release from hip hop duo Show and A.G.
