= David Gilliland =

American racing driver (born 1976)

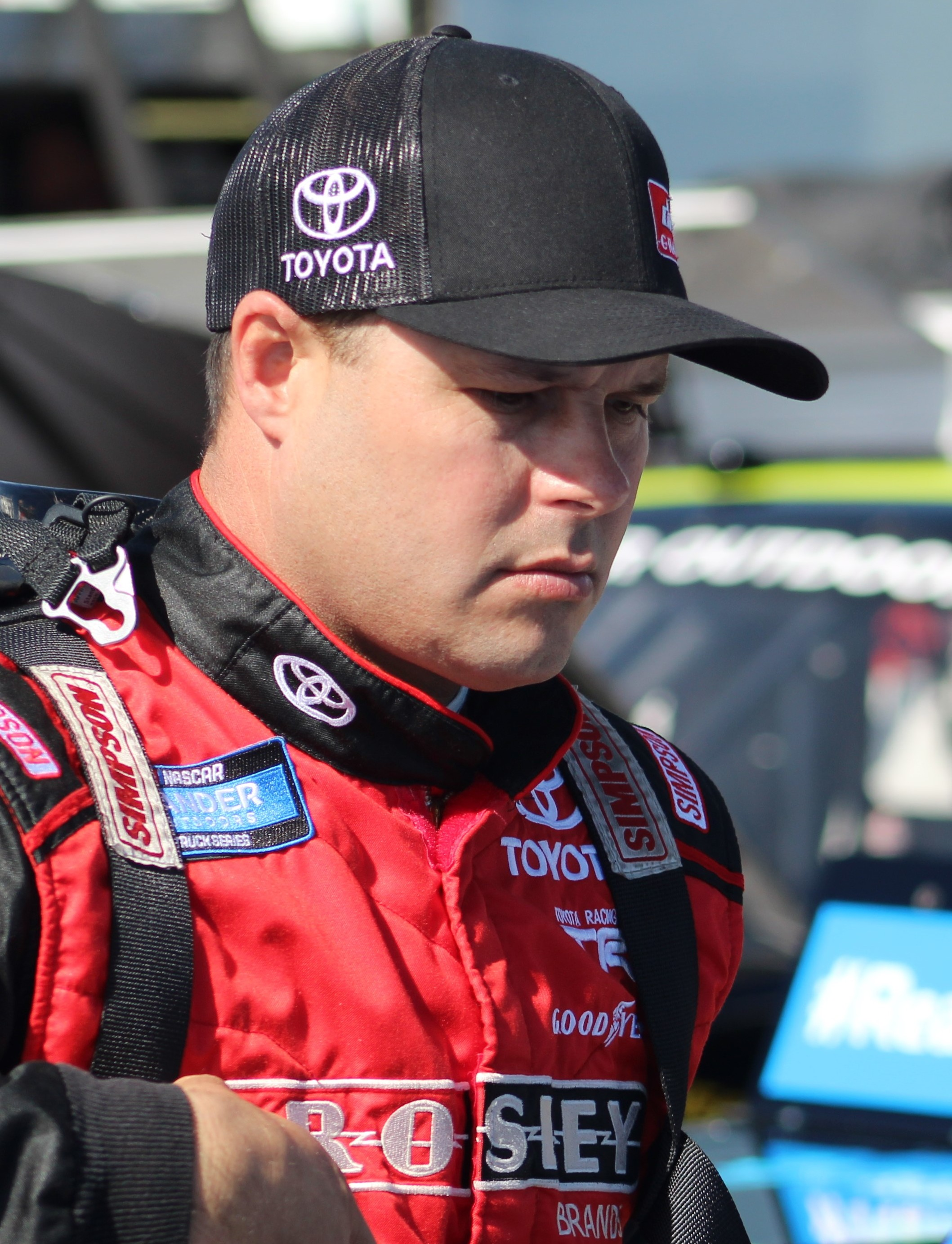
- Gilliland at Daytona International Speedway in 2019
- Born: David Leonard Gilliland; April 1, 1976 (age 50); Riverside, California, U.S.
- Achievements: 2007 Daytona 500 Pole Winner
- Awards: 2004 NASCAR West Series Rookie of the Year; West Coast Stock Car Hall of Fame (2022)

NASCAR Cup Series career
- 333 races run over 12 years
- 2018 position: 54th
- Best finish: 26th (2013)
- First race: 2006 Dodge/Save Mart 350 (Sonoma)
- Last race: 2018 Daytona 500 (Daytona)
Wins	Top tens	Poles
0	8	3

NASCAR O'Reilly Auto Parts Series career
- 56 races run over 6 years
- 2010 position: 48th
- Best finish: 39th (2007)
- First race: 2005 Bashas' Supermarkets 200 (Phoenix)
- Last race: 2010 Ford 300 (Homestead)
- First win: 2006 Meijer 300 (Kentucky)
Wins	Top tens	Poles
1	3	0

NASCAR FedEx Freight Truck Series career
- 22 races run over 7 years
- 2023 position: 43rd
- Best finish: 29th (2018)
- First race: 2005 Las Vegas 350 (Las Vegas)
- Last race: 2023 Love's RV Stop 250 (Talladega)
Wins	Top tens	Poles
0	6	2

ARCA Menards Series East career
- 3 races run over 3 years
- Best finish: 30th (2019)
- First race: 2019 Monaco Cocktails Gateway Classic 125 (Gateway)
- Last race: 2021 General Tire 125 (Dover)
Wins	Top tens	Poles
0	3	0

ARCA Menards Series West career
- 50 races run over 14 years
- Best finish: 3rd (2004)
- First race: 1997 Winston West 150 (Tucson)
- Last race: 2020 Arizona Lottery 150 (Phoenix)
- First win: 2004 Lucas Oil 150 (Mesa Marin)
- Last win: 2020 Arizona Lottery 100 (Phoenix)
Wins	Top tens	Poles
5	28	5
- Statistics up to date as of May 12, 2024.

David Leonard Gilliland (born April 1, 1976) is an American semi-retired professional stock car racing driver, crew chief and team owner. Since 2017, he has operated Tricon Garage, a team that races in the NASCAR Craftsman Truck Series. The team has also competed in the ARCA Menards Series, ARCA Menards Series West, ARCA Menards Series East, and CARS Tour.

Formerly a full-time competitor for a decade in the NASCAR Cup Series, Gilliland is now semi-retired and has competed part-time in the Truck Series, in the No. 1 Toyota Tundra and the ARCA Menards Series East and West, driving for his team. Born in Riverside, California, he is the son of former NASCAR Cup and West Series driver Butch Gilliland, and the father of current full-time Cup Series driver Todd Gilliland.

After competing full-time in the West Series like his father, Gilliland ran part-time in what is now the NASCAR Xfinity Series in 2006, and scored an unexpected win at Kentucky Speedway. In his first full season in the Cup Series, Gilliland would win the pole for the 2007 Daytona 500.

== Racing career ==
=== NASCAR ===
==== Regional series ====
In 1996, he began working on his father's Winston West Series team. By 1999, Gilliland won the track championship at Perris Auto Speedway (a dirt track). Then, the following year he began a limited season in the AutoZone West Series. In 2003, Gilliland won five races in the NASCAR AutoZone Elite Division, Southwest Series, in the No. 11 Centrifugal Technologies-sponsored Chevrolet. He finished the season with five top-fives and eight top-tens and a sixth-place finish in points.

In 2004, Gilliland announced plans to run the full schedule in the NASCAR AutoZone Elite Division, Southwest Series, in the No. 88 Chevrolet for MRG Motorsports and all non-conflicting NASCAR Grand National Division, West Series (now AutoZone West), races. He got his first AutoZone West win at Mesa Marin Raceway. He was then named NASCAR Grand National Division, West Series Rookie of the Year. He also had two victories in the NASCAR AutoZone Elite Division, Southwest Series.

==== National series ====
Gilliland made his first attempt at a major NASCAR race in 2003, at the Las Vegas 350 in the Craftsman Truck Series, but failed to qualify. He announced that Clay Andrews Racing would form in mid-2005. Gilliland made his Busch Series debut at Phoenix, qualifying 28th. However, he was involved with an early crash and finished 43rd. Gilliland made the other Phoenix race later in the year but had the same result. He was 43rd after ignition troubles. Also, he ran the No. 15 Billy Ballew Motorsports Chevy at Las Vegas Motor Speedway in the Craftsman Truck Series with a 22nd-place finish.

Meanwhile, Gilliland raced in the Grand National Division in 2005 and won the Toyota All-Star Showdown in 2005 when apparent winner Mike Olsen was disqualified for light wheels wider than regulation. The win brought Gilliland to the attention of Busch and Cup series team owners.

Gilliland began running the No. 84 Clay Andrews Chevy part-time in 2006, during which time he was mentored by former Sprint Cup race winner Jerry Nadeau. Gilliland, however, struggled to finish races, earning a best result of 29th in his first four starts of the year. However, in his next outing, Gilliland scored his first career Busch Series win at Kentucky on June 17. Gilliland drove the No. 84 Hype Manufacturing Chevrolet to victory, becoming the first driver of 2006 to win a Busch race who was not also running a full-time Nextel Cup schedule. FX television announcer Hermie Sadler called the victory "the biggest upset in Busch Series history".

==== Cup Series ====
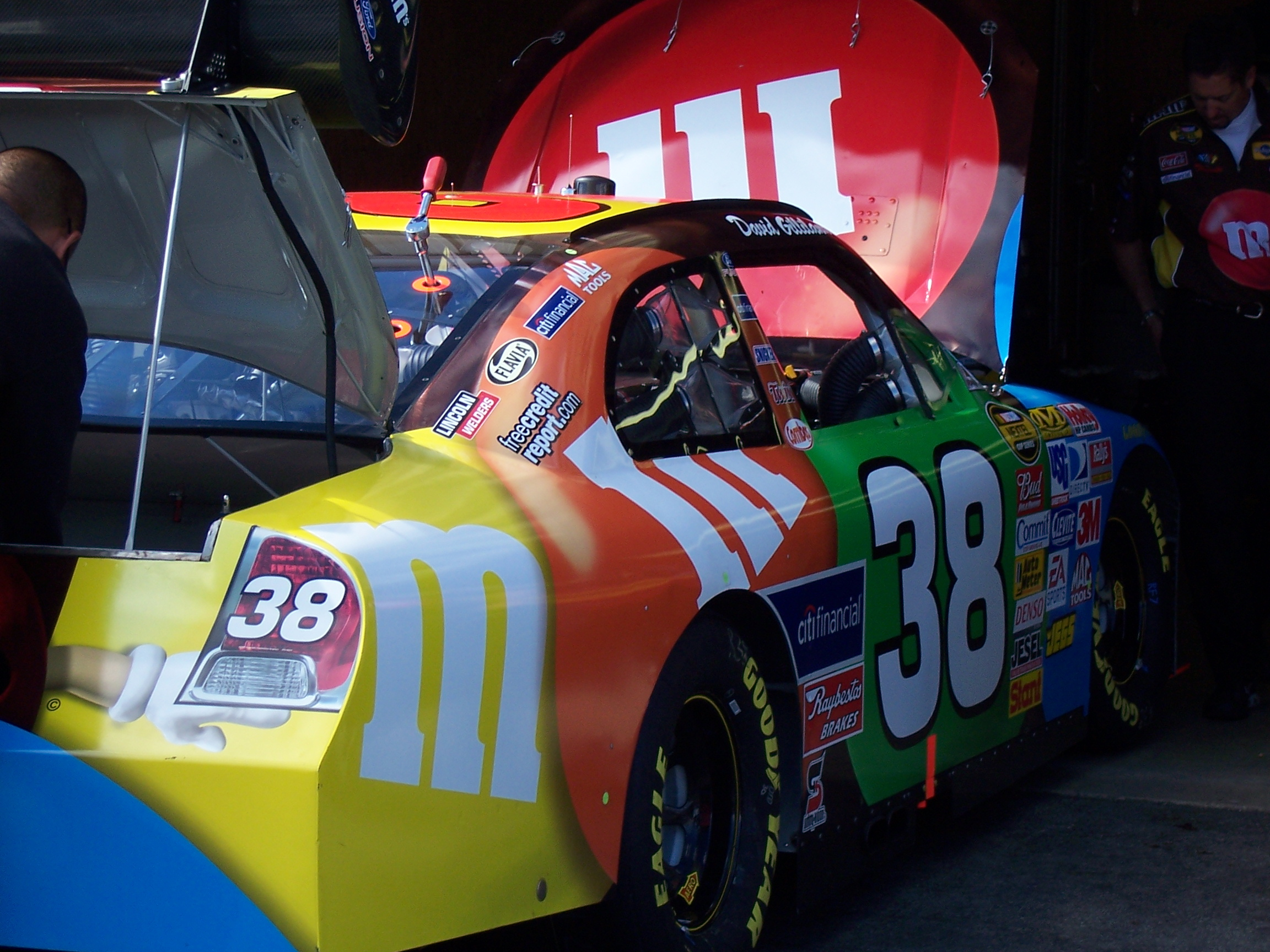
Gilliland's 2007 M&M's car

Gilliland made his first attempt to make a Cup race in June 2006 at Infineon Raceway in Sonoma, California, in the No. 72 Dutch Quality Stone Chevy for CJM Racing, qualifying 31st, and finishing 32nd. In August 2006, Gilliland replaced Elliott Sadler as the driver of the No. 38 M&Ms/Mars Ford in the NEXTEL Cup Series for Yates Racing. On October 7, he qualified on the pole for the UAW Ford 500 at Talladega Superspeedway, the first pole of his career in the Cup Series.

Gilliland went full-time in the No. 38 car in 2007 with M&M's and Mars returning as sponsors. However, Mars decided before the 2007 season to move its 2008 sponsorship to teammate Ricky Rudd’s 2007 ride at Yates, in preparation for moving to Kyle Busch in 2008. This meant Gilliland needed to impress in 2007 to attract a sponsor for the No. 38.

Gilliland started the season with a bang, winning his second career pole at the 2007 Daytona 500, his first points-paying race at the track. In the race itself, Gilliland finished 8th. Gilliland also drove part-time in the Busch Series for Team Rensi Motorsports with sponsorship from FreeCreditReport.com in 2007, splitting the driving duties at Rensi with rookie Richard Johns. His best finish in Busch was a tenth at Daytona.

In qualifying for the 2007 Aaron's 499 at Talladega on April 28, Gilliland recorded a speed of 192.069 miles per hour (309.105 km/h), which was identical to Jeff Gordon for the pole position. As Gordon had the points lead at the time of the race, Gilliland started the race in second, giving the pole to Gordon. Gilliland finished 28th in the Cup standings in 2007, recording two top-tens in his rookie season.

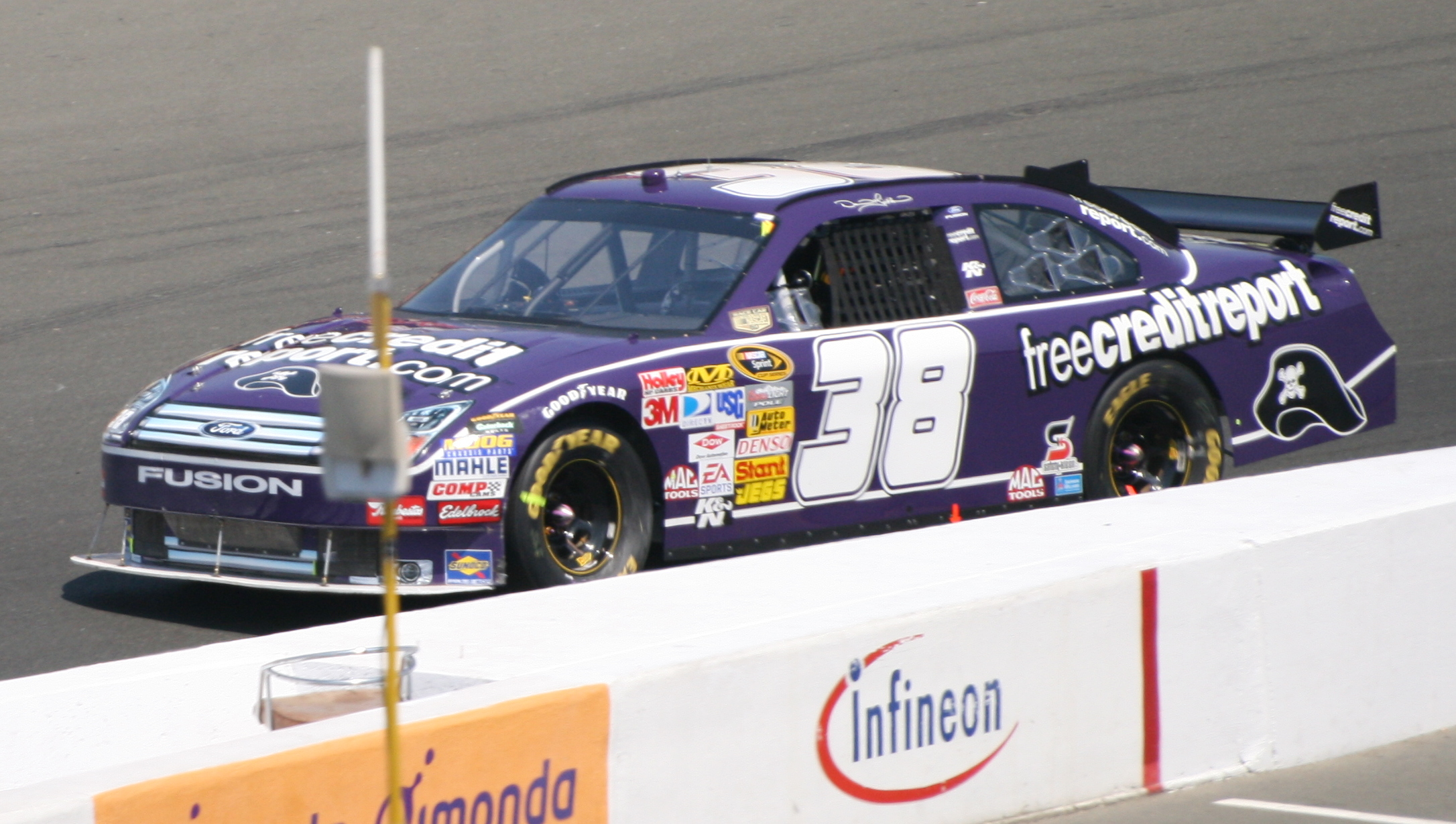
Gilliland during the 2008 Toyota/Save Mart 350, where he finished second

In 2008, Gilliland’s Busch Series sponsor FreeCreditReport.com, and Yates’ Busch Series sponsor Citi Financial became the new sponsors of the No. 38 Cup car. He also ran three Nationwide Series races, one for Travis Carter and Carl Haas, and two for Mike Curb and Gary Baker. Gilliland recorded a career-best second place finish in Cup at Sonoma Raceway. Kyle Busch won the race with Gilliland's old sponsor, M&M's, as Gilliland finished runner-up in his FreeCreditReport.com-sponsored Ford. At Texas in the fall, Gilliland was penalized by NASCAR for wrecking Juan Pablo Montoya. Gilliland again had two top-ten finishes in 2008, improving slightly to 27th in points.

In January 2009, his No. 38 Sprint Cup team was closed due to a lack of sponsorship, and his points from 2008 were moved to the Hall of Fame Racing team of Bobby Labonte.

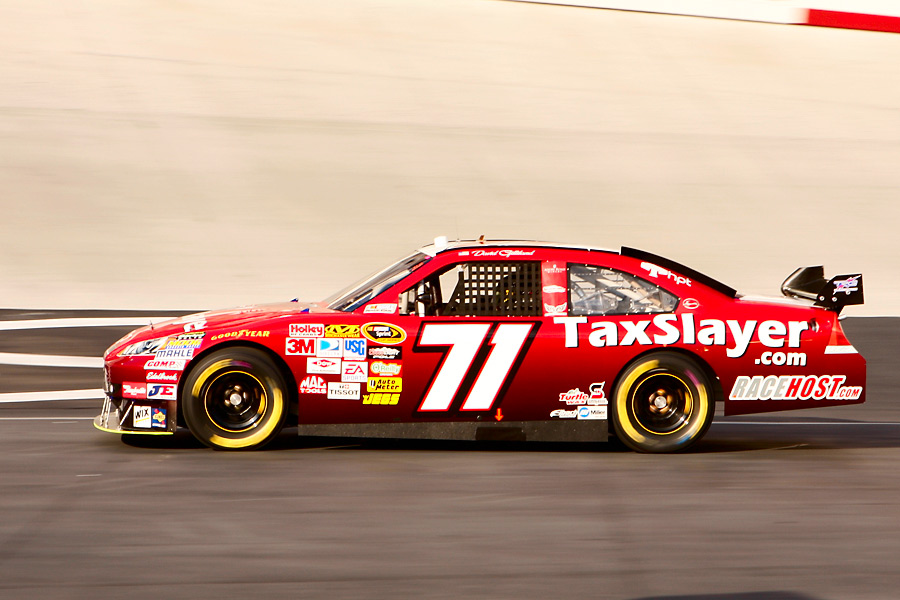
Gilliland’s No. 71 at Bristol Motor Speedway in 2009

After sitting out the 2009 Daytona 500 without a ride, he was hired by TRG Motorsports for the rest of the 2009 season to drive the No. 71 Chevrolet, with sponsorships from TaxSlayer, Capital Window, and American Monster. However, the season proved tough as TRG was short on funding by May, forcing Gilliland to start and park on several occasions. In August, Gilliland failed to qualify a second TRG car, the No. 70, at Watkins Glen. By September, Labonte was now part-time at Hall of Fame and it was announced he would bring much-needed funding to TRG in seven of the final twelve races, replacing Gilliland who would not have been able to run full races. Gilliland did run the other five races for TRG in the No. 71 with limited funding.

Gilliland then landed a three-race deal to drive a new part-time fourth Joe Gibbs Racing car, the No. 02 Farm Bureau Insurance Toyota.

In addition to his part-time rides at the No. 02 and the No. 71, in the second half of 2009 Gilliland also ran one race each in Cup for the Wood Brothers, in the iconic No. 21 Ford, for Robby Gordon in his No. 7 Toyota, and for Phoenix Racing in the No. 09 Chevy, also running several Nationwide Series races for Phoenix. Gilliland also failed to qualify a Gordon-owned No. 04 Toyota at Kansas. At California in October, Gilliland relieved a sick Kyle Busch after parking the TRG car.

Gilliland managed to attempt all but two races in 2009 (the 500 and the fall Loudon race), salvaging 37th in points despite running for so many different teams. His best finish was a fourteenth at Las Vegas in the No. 71, with a nineteenth place at Atlanta in the Wood Brothers No. 21 being his second-best run of 2009.

In 2010, Gilliland began the season with BAM Racing in the No. 49 after the team took the 2009 season off. However, the team failed to qualify for the Daytona 500 and shut down for good. Left without a ride, Gilliland ended up attempting every remaining race in one of Front Row Motorsports’ three Fords, either the No. 34, the No. 37, or the No. 38; missing the show at Indy in the No. 38. He was sponsored by Taco Bell in most races. Gilliland's best finishes in 2010 came at Martinsville and Sonoma, a nineteenth at both tracks. After having his initial ride shut down for the second straight season, Gilliland again scrambled to finish 32nd in points.

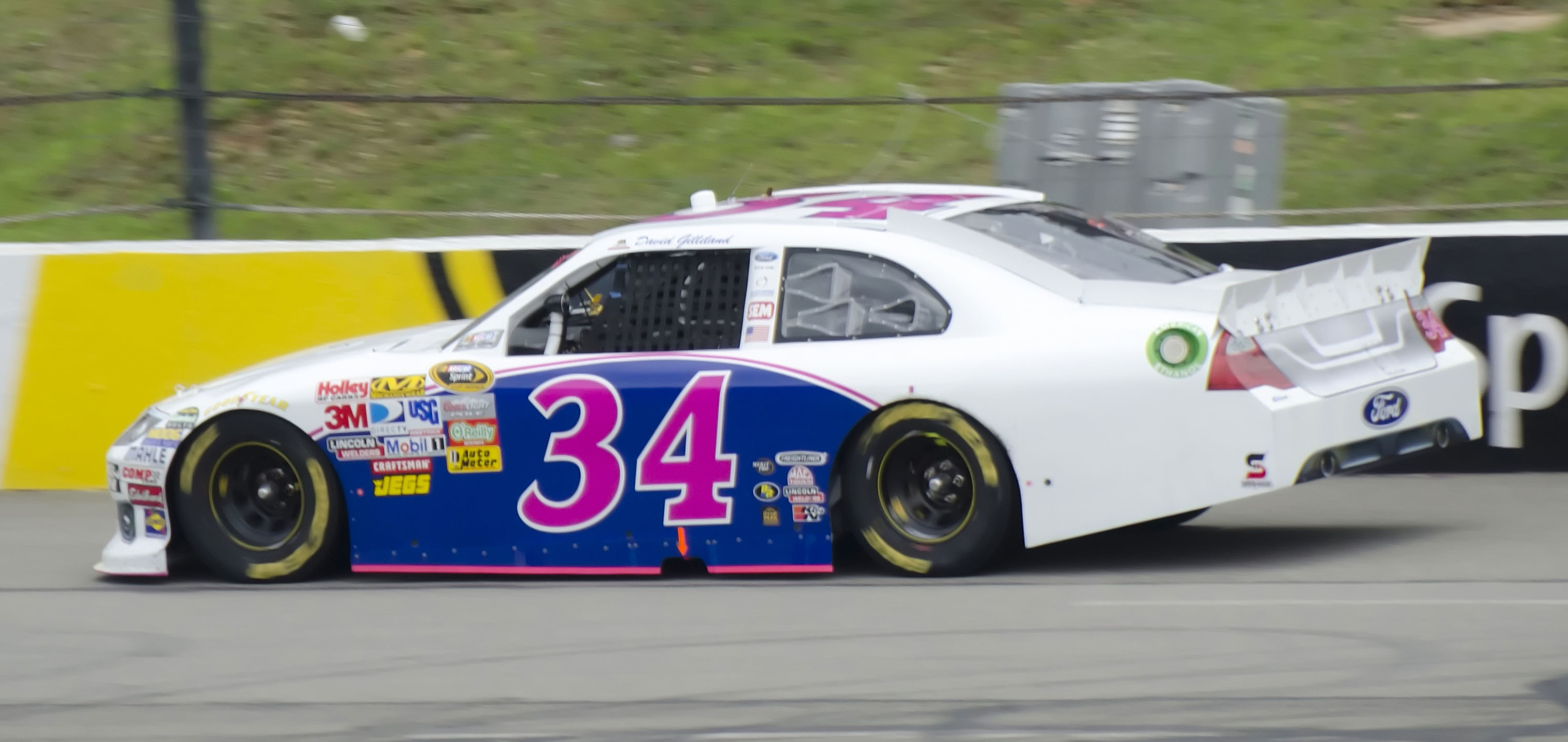
Gilliland's No. 34 at Pocono Raceway in 2011

In 2011, Gilliland began driving FRM's No. 34 Taco Bell Ford full-time. He finished third in the 2011 Daytona 500, the team's best finish in a race to that point, and Gilliland's second-best finish in Cup. Gilliland recorded two top-ten finishes in 2011 and ended up thirtieth in Cup points.

For 2012, Gilliland moved to the team's No. 38 car. Gilliland's primary sponsor was Long John Silver's, and his team later received a multi-race sponsorship from Modspace for the 2012 season. Gilliland nearly finished third in the Daytona 500 for the second straight year, but a late red flag was lifted and Gilliland was shuffled back to 23rd. Gilliland had a best finish of thirteenth and wound up thirtieth in the standing for a second consecutive year.

In 2013, Gilliland returned to the No. 38 Ford, with Love's Travel Stops coming on board to join Long John Silvers on the car. At the spring Talladega race, Gilliland pushed FRM teammate David Ragan to victory in a green-white-checkered finish that saw Gilliland tie his career-best finish of second, giving FRM a one-two finish in the race, the first in team history Gilliland recorded two Top 10 finishes in 2013, finishing 26th in points, the best Cup points finish of Gilliland's career.

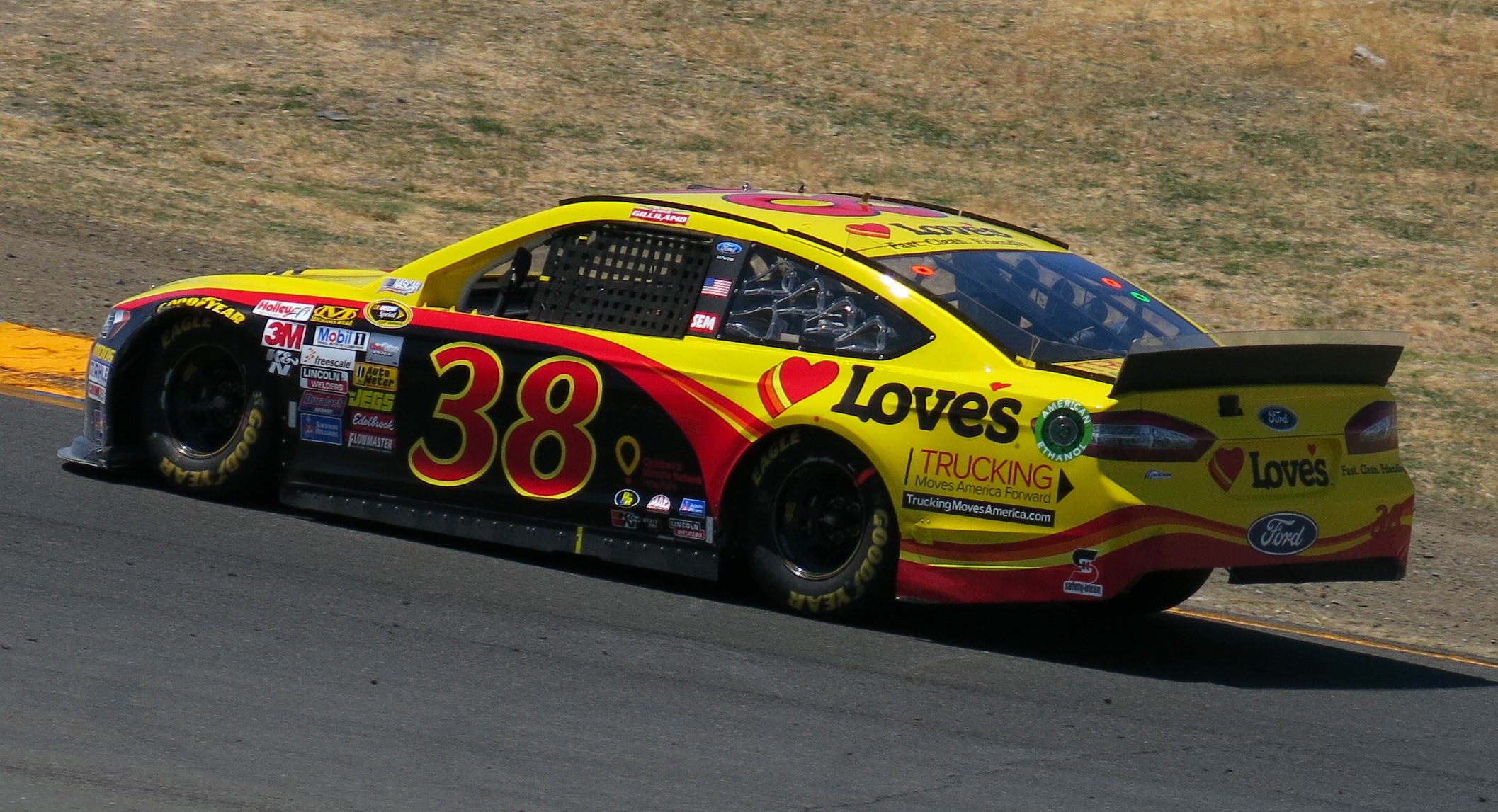
Gilliland's No. 38 at Sonoma Raceway in 2014

Gilliland returned once again to the No. 38 in 2014, with Love's now as the primary sponsor on his Ford. Gilliland won the pole for the 2014 Coke Zero 400, with a lap speed of 199.322 miles per hour (320.778 km/h) his first pole since 2007 after he won the first round of qualifying and rain prevented further rounds. It was the first pole for the Front Row Motorsports team. However, Gilliland did retreat to thirtieth in points once again.

Gilliland was back in the No. 38 Love's-sponsored Ford in 2015. He also returned to the Truck Series for a part-time schedule in the No. 92 Ricky Benton Racing Ford, where he recorded two top-tens. In the Cup Series, Gilliland finished 11th at the season-opening Daytona 500. His second-best finish was an eighteenth place at Bristol, and Gilliland finished 32nd in driver points. 2015 would turn out to be Gilliland's final full season in NASCAR.

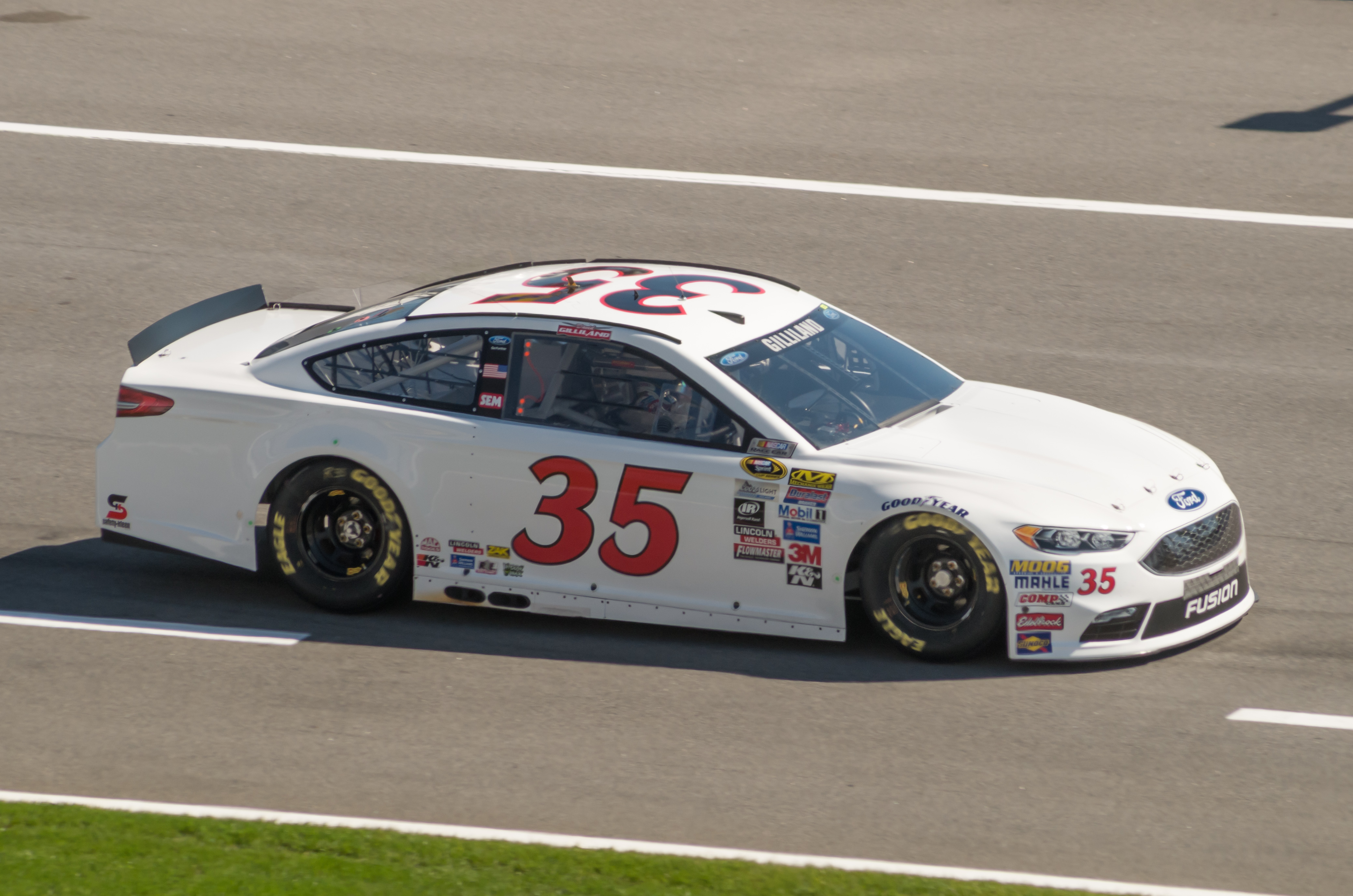
Gilliland's 2016 Cup car for Front Row Motorsports

Gilliland was replaced by Landon Cassill in 2016, but returned to FRM for the Daytona 500 in the No. 35. However, he failed to qualify for the race. Though the 500 was only supposed to be a one race deal, Gilliland and Front Row announced plans to run at Talladega in April. Gilliland qualified the race beating Josh Wise, and finished seventeenth after running in the top-three in the final two laps. The two starts in the No. 35 were Gilliland's only appearances in the 2016 Cup season.

In 2017, Gilliland did not race in Cup or any other NASCAR series.

On January 17, 2018, it was announced that Gilliland joined Ricky Benton Racing to attempt the Daytona 500 in the No. 92 CarQuest Auto Parts-sponsored Ford Fusion. Gilliland, who had run for RBR in the Truck Series in 2015, had to go to a backup car for the 500 after wrecking out of the Duel race. However, Gilliland's attention in 2018 mostly went to the Camping World Truck Series, where Gilliland is an owner and driver.

==== Post-Cup career ====
Gilliland returned to the Camping World Truck Series in 2018, participating in the NextEra Energy Resources 250 at Daytona as a substitute driver for his son Todd. Under NASCAR regulations, Todd Gilliland was ineligible to participate at any track larger than 1.25 miles until May 15, 2018 (his eighteenth birthday), and team owner Kyle Busch asked David to drive for his son in one of the four races where he was ineligible in 2018. Gilliland also became a team owner in the Truck Series, partnering with Bo LeMastus to buy the assets of Red Horse Racing, with which the team DGR-Crosley was formed. Gilliland ran a partial schedule in the team's No. 54 entry, running near the front of the field. In 2019, he drove DGR-Crosley's No. 17 at Daytona and again at Martinsville Speedway in March. He drove the DGR-Crosley No. 54 in the K&N Pro Series West race at Gateway, finishing third. He ran the ARCA Menards Series East race at Dover in 2020, finishing second. He would also run the 2020 ARCA Menards Series West finale at Phoenix, which he would win.

DGR-Crosley reverted to the David Gilliland Racing name in 2021 as Johnny Gray took over as co-owner. On February 5, 2021, it was announced that Gilliland would return to the Truck Series to drive for his team again in the season-opener at Daytona. He attempted to qualify for the race in the team's part-time No. 17 truck. Gilliland finished the race in fourteenth. He would return to the truck at Las Vegas and Darlington, finishing 39th and 28th respectively. He would also return to the ARCA Menards Series East, finishing third at Dover. On September 21, Gilliland was suspended for one race, fined US$1,500 and placed on probation by ARCA for the remainder of the 2021 season for non-compliant activities on pit road at the Bristol race. During the race, Drew Dollar spun DGR driver Thad Moffitt, resulting in a fight between Gilliland and Dollar on pit road. Gilliland returned to his team in 2023, racing at Charlotte and Talladega. He would finish fourteenth at Charlotte and crashed out at Talladega, leading to a 35th place finish.

== Crew chiefing career ==
Gilliland was the crew chief for his father Butch Gilliland's 1997 NASCAR Winston West Series championship season, in which they won four races. He was also the crew chief for Butch in the NASCAR Thunder Suzuka Special that year. He returned as the crew chief in 1998, and the pair won three more races. Gilliland returned to the crew chief role in 2020, where he guided Taylor Gray to a fourth place finish in an ARCA race at Springfield. He was the crew chief for his son Todd in a Truck Series race at Nashville Superspeedway, where he finished 2nd.

== Personal life ==
Gilliland was a high school golf teammate of Tiger Woods at Western High School in Anaheim.

He is married to his wife Michelle and the couple has two children, Todd and Taylor. Todd, a two-time consecutive champion in what is now the ARCA Menards Series West, currently competes full-time in the Cup Series in the No. 34 Ford Mustang for Front Row Motorsports, which has an alliance with Tricon Garage, his family team.

His son Todd has a racing career and on May 17, 2015, became the youngest winner in the history of ARCA at age 15 and 2 days with a win at Toledo Speedway. Todd followed it up with a win at the K&N Pro Series West race at Phoenix International Raceway, making three generations of the Gilliland family to have won in the series.

== Motorsports career results ==
=== NASCAR ===
(key) (Bold – Pole position awarded by qualifying time. Italics – Pole position earned by points standings or practice time. * – Most laps led.)

==== Monster Energy Cup Series ====
Monster Energy NASCAR Cup Series results
Year	Team	No.	Make	1	2	3	4	5	6	7	8	9	10	11	12	13	14	15	16	17	18	19	20	21	22	23	24	25	26	27	28	29	30	31	32	33	34	35	36	MENCC	Pts	Ref
2006	CJM Racing	72	Dodge	DAY	CAL	LVS	ATL	BRI	MAR	TEX	PHO	TAL	RCH	DAR	CLT	DOV	POC	MCH	SON; 32	DAY	CHI	NHA	POC	IND	GLN															42nd	1178	
2006	Robert Yates Racing	38	Ford																							MCH; 38	BRI; 40	CAL; 32	RCH; 36	NHA; 36	DOV; 27	KAN; 22	**TAL**; 15	CLT; 33	MAR; 28	ATL; 15	TEX; 21	PHO; 16	HOM; 33	42nd	1178	
2007	Robert Yates Racing	38	Ford	**DAY**; 8	CAL; 25	LVS; 21	ATL; 30	BRI; 41	MAR; 39	TEX; 19	PHO; 35	TAL; 4	RCH; 42	DAR; 30	CLT; 35	DOV; 29	POC; 34	MCH; 17	SON; 25	NHA; 28	DAY; 11	CHI; 16	IND; 17	POC; 39	GLN; 33	MCH; 28	BRI; 30	CAL; 25	RCH; 22	NHA; 39	DOV; 24	KAN; 34	TAL; 27	CLT; 25	MAR; 25	ATL; 42	TEX; 28	PHO; 28	HOM; 32	28th	2924	
2008	Yates Racing	38	Ford	DAY; 28	CAL; 17	LVS; 23	ATL; 32	BRI; 9	MAR; 24	TEX; 15	PHO; 15	TAL; 15	RCH; 41	DAR; 20	CLT; 40	DOV; 16	POC; 16	MCH; 27	SON; 2	NHA; 28	DAY; 40	CHI; 42	IND; 20	POC; 34	GLN; 40	MCH; 26	BRI; 22	CAL; 23	RCH; 18	NHA; 41	DOV; 19	KAN; 22	TAL; 40	CLT; 25	MAR; 32	ATL; 27	TEX; 42	PHO; 35	HOM; 27	27th	3064	
2009	TRG Motorsports	71	Chevy	DAY	CAL; 33	LVS; 14	ATL; 24	BRI; 36	MAR; 36	TEX; 29	PHO; 33	TAL; 40	RCH; 39	DAR; 43	CLT; 27	DOV; 43	POC; 42	MCH; 32	SON; 32	NHA; 40	DAY; 40	CHI; 42	IND; 30	POC; 41		MCH; 40	BRI; 39				DOV; 39		CAL; 42		MAR; 39	TAL				37th	1928	
2009	TRG Motorsports	70	Chevy																						GLN; DNQ															37th	1928	
2009	Wood Brothers Racing	21	Ford																									ATL; 19												37th	1928	
2009	Robby Gordon Motorsports	7	Toyota																										RCH; 24	NHA										37th	1928	
2009	Robby Gordon Motorsports	04	Toyota																													KAN; DNQ								37th	1928	
2009	Joe Gibbs Racing	02	Toyota																															CLT; 25			TEX; 28		HOM; 29	37th	1928	
2009	Phoenix Racing	09	Chevy																																			PHO; 30		37th	1928	
2010	BAM Racing	49	Toyota	DAY; DNQ																																				32nd	2445	
2010	Front Row Motorsports	38	Ford		CAL; 26	LVS; 30	ATL; 26	BRI; 23						DAR; 35	DOV; 25				SON; 19				IND; DNQ		GLN; 27		BRI; 26				DOV; 30		CAL; 20	CLT; 28			TEX; 29			32nd	2445	
2010	Front Row Motorsports	37	Ford						MAR; 19	PHO; 32	TEX; 29	TAL	RCH; 31			CLT; 26	POC; 33	MCH; 35		NHA; 35	DAY	CHI; 32		POC; 30		MCH; 36		ATL; 20	RCH; 37	NHA; 33		KAN; 32			MAR; 37	TAL; 33		PHO; 38	HOM; 25	32nd	2445	
2011	Front Row Motorsports	34	Ford	DAY; 3	PHO; 22	LVS; 37	BRI; 27	CAL; 31	MAR; 33	TEX; 42	TAL; 9	RCH; 25	DAR; 32	DOV; 22	CLT; 33	KAN; 33	POC; 29	MCH; 29	SON; 12	DAY; 16	KEN; 31	NHA; 25	IND; 33	POC; 23	GLN; 33	MCH; 32	BRI; 24	ATL; 37	RCH; 27	CHI; 36	NHA; 32	DOV; 28	KAN; 32	CLT; 36	TAL; 22	MAR; 34	TEX; 32	PHO; 31	HOM; 33	30th	572	
2012	Front Row Motorsports	38	Ford	DAY; 23	PHO; 28	LVS; 33	BRI; 26	CAL; 30	MAR; 28	TEX; 31	KAN; 27	RCH; 36	TAL; 13	DAR; 25	CLT; 26	DOV; 40	POC; 23	MCH; 27	SON; 26	KEN; 28	DAY; 31	NHA; 27	IND; 27	POC; 21	GLN; 20	MCH; 18	BRI; 20	ATL; 31	RCH; 31	CHI; 28	NHA; 32	DOV; 32	TAL; 15	CLT; 23	KAN; 23	MAR; 30	TEX; 35	PHO; 36	HOM; 33	30th	605	
2013	Front Row Motorsports	38	Ford	DAY; 38	PHO; 37	LVS; 28	BRI; 24	CAL; 29	MAR; 28	TEX; 32	KAN; 23	RCH; 27	TAL; 2	DAR; 29	CLT; 20	DOV; 37	POC; 24	MCH; 22	SON; 24	KEN; 28	DAY; 15	NHA; 18	IND; 35	POC; 39	GLN; 25	MCH; 37	BRI; 25	ATL; 17	RCH; 23	CHI; 28	NHA; 39	DOV; 30	KAN; 24	CLT; 29	TAL; 7	MAR; 23	TEX; 26	PHO; 24	HOM; 27	26th	648	
2014	Front Row Motorsports	38	Ford	DAY; 36	PHO; 39	LVS; 30	BRI; 22	CAL; 38	MAR; 26	TEX; 22	DAR; 28	RCH; 20	TAL; 40	KAN; 37	CLT; 43	DOV; 29	POC; 28	MCH; 26	SON; 21	KEN; 30	**DAY**; 35	NHA; 24	IND; 36	POC; 17	GLN; 22	MCH; 21	BRI; 25	ATL; 28	RCH; 29	CHI; 34	NHA; 27	DOV; 33	KAN; 30	CLT; 32	TAL; 29	MAR; 22	TEX; 34	PHO; 24	HOM; 31	30th	554	
2015	Front Row Motorsports	38	Ford	DAY; 11	ATL; 22	LVS; 23	PHO; 29	CAL; 35	MAR; 25	TEX; 28	BRI; 18	RCH; 31	TAL; 20	KAN; 32	CLT; 33	DOV; 25	POC; 27	MCH; 42	SON; 43	DAY; 40	KEN; 29	NHA; 21	IND; 29	POC; 33	GLN; 33	MCH; 32	BRI; 36	DAR; 27	RCH; 33	CHI; 32	NHA; 28	DOV; 30	CLT; 27	KAN; 36	TAL; 32	MAR; 24	TEX; 29	PHO; 30	HOM; 32	32nd	533	
2016	Front Row Motorsports	35	Ford	DAY; DNQ	ATL	LVS	PHO	CAL	MAR	TEX	BRI	RCH	TAL; 17	KAN	DOV	CLT	POC	MCH	SON	DAY; 19	KEN	NHA	IND	POC	GLN	BRI	MCH	DAR	RCH	CHI	NHA	DOV	CLT	KAN	TAL; DNQ	MAR	TEX	PHO	HOM	44th	46	
2018	RBR Enterprises	92	Ford	DAY; 14	ATL	LVS	PHO	CAL	MAR	TEX	BRI	RCH	TAL	DOV	KAN	CLT	POC	MCH	SON	CHI	DAY	KEN	NHA	POC	GLN	MCH	BRI	DAR	IND	LVS	RCH	CLT	DOV	TAL	KAN	MAR	TEX	PHO	HOM	54th	0^{1}	

===== Daytona 500 =====
Year	Team	Manufacturer	Start	Finish
2007	Robert Yates Racing	Ford	**1**	8
2008	Yates Racing	Ford	32	28
2010	BAM Racing	Toyota	DNQ	
2011	Front Row Motorsports	Ford	39	3
2012	Front Row Motorsports	Ford	33	23
2013	Front Row Motorsports	Ford	25	38
2014	Front Row Motorsports	Ford	17	36
2015	Front Row Motorsports	Ford	26	11
2016	Front Row Motorsports	Ford	DNQ	
2018	RBR Enterprises	Ford	39	14

==== Nationwide Series ====
NASCAR Nationwide Series results
Year	Team	No.	Make	1	2	3	4	5	6	7	8	9	10	11	12	13	14	15	16	17	18	19	20	21	22	23	24	25	26	27	28	29	30	31	32	33	34	35	NNSC	Pts	Ref
2004	Robby Gordon Motorsports	55	Chevy	DAY	CAR	LVS	DAR	BRI	TEX	NSH	TAL	CAL	GTY	RCH	NZH	CLT	DOV	NSH	KEN	MLW	DAY	CHI	NHA	PPR	IRP	MCH	BRI	CAL	RCH	DOV	KAN	CLT	MEM	ATL	PHO	DAR	HOM; QL^{†}		N/A	N/A	
2005	Golembeski Racing	54	Chevy	DAY	CAL	MXC	LVS	ATL	NSH	BRI	TEX	PHO; 43	TAL	DAR	RCH	CLT	DOV	NSH	KEN	MLW	DAY	CHI	NHA	PPR	GTY	IRP	GLN	MCH	BRI	CAL	RCH	DOV	KAN	CLT	MEM	TEX			127th	68	
2005	Clay Andrews Racing	03	Chevy																																		PHO; 43	HOM	127th	68	
2006	Clay Andrews Racing	84	Chevy	DAY	CAL; DNQ	MXC	LVS; 39	ATL	BRI	TEX; 29	NSH	PHO; 33	TAL	RCH; 30	DAR	CLT; DNQ	DOV	NSH	KEN; 1	MLW	DAY	CHI; 26	NHA	MAR; 36	GTY														56th	733	
2006	Robert Yates Racing	90	Ford																							IRP; 29	GLN	MCH	BRI	CAL	RCH; 30	DOV	KAN	CLT	MEM	TEX	PHO	HOM	56th	733	
2007	Team Rensi Motorsports	25	Ford	DAY; 20	CAL	MXC; 36	LVS; 32	ATL; 31	BRI; 35	NSH	TEX; 26	PHO; 16	TAL; 37	RCH; 20	DAR; 33	CLT; 27	DOV; 29	NSH	KEN	MLW	NHA; 19	DAY; 10	CHI; 27	GTY	IRP	CGV	GLN; 16	MCH; 29	BRI; 41	CAL; 18	RCH	DOV	KAN	CLT	MEM	TEX	PHO	HOM	39th	1597	
2008	Richardson-Haas Motorsports	14	Ford	DAY; 40	CAL	LVS	ATL	BRI	NSH	TEX	PHO	MXC	TAL	RCH	DAR	CLT	DOV	NSH	KEN	MLW	NHA	DAY	CHI	GTY	IRP	CGV	GLN												95th	191	
2008	Baker Curb Racing	27	Ford																									MCH; 20	BRI	CAL; 31	RCH	DOV	KAN	CLT	MEM	TEX	PHO	HOM	95th	191	
2009	Smith-Ganassi Racing	42	Dodge	DAY	CAL	LVS	BRI	TEX	NSH	PHO	TAL	RCH	DAR	CLT; 15	DOV	NSH	KEN	MLW	NHA	DAY; 27	CHI	GTY	IRP	IOW	GLN	MCH	BRI	CGV	ATL; 15	RCH	DOV								63rd	672	
2009	Phoenix Racing	1	Chevy																													KAN; 19	CAL; 8	CLT; 19	MEM	TEX	PHO	HOM	63rd	672	
2010	D'Hondt Humphrey Motorsports	91	Chevy	DAY	CAL	LVS	BRI; 42	NSH	PHO; 41	TEX; 41	TAL	RCH; 39	DAR; 41	DOV; 43	CLT; 41	NSH	KEN	ROA	NHA; 38	DAY	CHI; 39	GTY	IRP	IOW	GLN	MCH	BRI; 41	CGV			DOV; 38	KAN; 41	CAL; 36	CLT	GTY	TEX; 40	PHO; 39	HOM; 40	48th	800	
2010	Smith-Ganassi Racing	42	Dodge																										ATL; 17	RCH									48th	800	
^{†} - Qualified for Robby Gordon.

==== Craftsman Truck Series ====
NASCAR Craftsman Truck Series results
Year	Team	No.	Make	1	2	3	4	5	6	7	8	9	10	11	12	13	14	15	16	17	18	19	20	21	22	23	24	25	NCTC	Pts	Ref
2003	Midgley Racing	09	Chevy	DAY	DAR	MMR	MAR	CLT	DOV	TEX	MEM	MLW	KAN	KEN	GTW	MCH	IRP	NSH	BRI	RCH	NHA	CAL	LVS; DNQ	SBO	TEX	MAR	PHO	HOM	N/A	0	
2005	Billy Ballew Motorsports	15	Chevy	DAY	CAL	ATL	MAR	GTY	MFD	CLT	DOV	TEX	MCH	MLW	KAN	KEN	MEM	IRP	NSH	BRI	RCH	NHA	LVS; 22	MAR	ATL	TEX	PHO	HOM	79th	97	
2009	TRG Motorsports	7	Chevy	DAY	CAL	ATL	MAR	KAN	CLT; 6	DOV	TEX	MCH	MLW	MEM	KEN	IRP	NSH	BRI	CHI	IOW	GTW	NHA	LVS	MAR	TAL	TEX	PHO		65th	208	
2009	ThorSport Racing	98	Chevy																									HOM; 35	65th	208	
2015	RBR Enterprises	92	Ford	DAY; 6	ATL	MAR; 30	KAN	CLT; 27	DOV	TEX	GTW	IOW	KEN; 7	ELD	POC	MCH	BRI; 13	MSP	CHI	NHA	LVS	TAL	MAR; 23	TEX	PHO	HOM; 16			92nd	0^{1}	
2018	Kyle Busch Motorsports	4	Toyota	**DAY**; 21	ATL	LVS	MAR																						29th	152	
2018	DGR-Crosley	54	Toyota					DOV; 4	KAN	CLT	TEX	IOW; 4	GTW	CHI	KEN	ELD	POC	MCH	BRI	MSP	LVS								29th	152	
2018	Kyle Busch Motorsports	51	Toyota																			**TAL**; 3	MAR						29th	152	
2018	DGR-Crosley	17	Toyota																					TEX; 30	PHO	HOM			29th	152	
2019	DGR-Crosley	17	Toyota	DAY; 13	ATL	LVS																							47th	56	
2019	DGR-Crosley	54	Toyota				MAR; 12	TEX	DOV	KAN	CLT	TEX	IOW	GTW	CHI	KEN	POC	ELD	MCH	BRI	MSP	LVS	TAL	MAR	PHO	HOM			47th	56	
2021	David Gilliland Racing	17	Ford	DAY; 14	DAY	LVS; 39	ATL	BRI	RCH	KAN	DAR; 28	COA	CLT	TEX	NSH	POC	KNX	GLN	GTW	DAR	BRI	LVS	TAL	MAR	PHO				51st	43	
2023	TRICON Garage	1	Toyota	DAY	LVS	ATL	COA	TEX	BRI	MAR	KAN	DAR	NWS	CLT; 14	GTW	NSH	MOH	POC	RCH	IRP	MLW	KAN	BRI	TAL; 35	HOM	PHO			43rd	32	

^{*} Season still in progress
^{1} Ineligible for series points

=== ARCA Menards Series ===
(key) (Bold – Pole position awarded by qualifying time. Italics – Pole position earned by points standings or practice time. * – Most laps led.)

==== ARCA Menards Series East ====
ARCA Menards Series East results
Year	Team	No.	Make	1	2	3	4	5	6	7	8	9	10	11	12	AMSEC	Pts	Ref
2019	DGR-Crosley	54	Toyota	NSM	BRI	SBO	SBO	MEM	NHA	IOW	GLN	BRI	GTW; 3	NHA	DOV	30th	41	
2020	DGR-Crosley	54	Ford	NSM	TOL	DOV; 2	TOL	BRI	FIF							31st	42	
2021	David Gilliland Racing	17	Ford	NSM	FIF	NSV	DOV; 3	SNM	IOW	MLW	BRI					34th	41	

==== ARCA Menards Series West ====
ARCA Menards Series West results
Year	Team	No.	Make	1	2	3	4	5	6	7	8	9	10	11	12	13	14	15	AMSWC	Pts	Ref
1997	Stroppe Motorsports	1	Ford	TUS; 21	AMP	SON	TUS	MMR											26th	500	
1997	Stroppe Motorsports	8	Ford						LVS; 22					AMP; 15	SON	MMR	LVS		26th	500	
1997	Stroppe Motorsports	88	Ford							CAL; 23	EVG	POR	PPR; 24						26th	500	
1999	Hilton Racing	11	Ford	TUS; 22	LVS	PHO	CAL	PPR	MMR; 24	IRW	EVG	POR	IRW	RMR	LVS; 26	MMR; 7	MOT		35th	419	
2000	Quick Pick Motorsports	43	Chevy	PHO	MMR	LVS	CAL	LAG	IRW	POR	EVG	IRW	RMR	MMR	IRW; 21				65th	100	
2001	Quick Pick Motorsports	43	Chevy	PHO	LVS	TUS	MMR	CAL; 8	IRW	LAG	KAN	EVG	CNS	IRW; 24	RMR	LVS	IRW		41st	233	
2002	Eshleman Racing	24	Chevy	PHO	LVS	CAL; 5	KAN; 16	EVG											21st	506	
2002	Eshleman Racing	11	Chevy						IRW; 12	S99	RMR	DCS	LVS; 18						21st	506	
2004	Golembeski Racing	88	Chevy	PHO; 11	MMR; 1	CAL; 6	S99; 3	**EVG**; 6	IRW; 20	S99; 15	RMR; 5	DCS; 2	PHO; 5	CNS; 5	MMR; 18	IRW; 4			3rd	1915	
2005	Golembeski Racing	88	Chevy	**PHO**; 1	MMR; 2	PHO; 29	S99; 5	IRW; 5	EVG; 2	S99; 3	PPR; 8	**CAL**; 16*	DCS; 4	CTS; 2	MMR; 4				4th	1858	
2007	Sunrise Ford Racing	82	Ford	PHO	AMP	ELK	IOW	CNS	**SON**; 1*	DCS	IRW	MMP	EVG	CSR	AMP				41st	190	
2009	Speed Wong Racing	89	Toyota	CTS	AAS	PHO; 32	MAD	IOW	DCS										54th	139	
2009	Speed Wong Racing	45	Dodge							SON; 32	IRW	PIR	MMP	CNS	IOW	AAS			54th	139	
2010	Speed Wong Racing	45	Dodge	AAS	PHO	IOW	DCS	SON; 28*	IRW	POR	MON	COL	MMP	AAS	PHO				73rd	89	
2011	Sunrise Ford Racing	9	Ford	PHO	AAS	MMP	IOW	LVS	SON; 2	IRW	EVG	PIR	CNS	MRP	SPO	AAS	PHO		65th	175	
2012	Sunrise Ford Racing	9	Ford	PHO; 9	LHC	MMP	S99	IOW	BIR	LVS									33rd	82	
2012	Naake-Klauer Motorsports	25	Chevy								SON; 1	EVG	CNS	IOW	PIR	SMP	AAS	PHO	33rd	82	
2019	DGR-Crosley	54	Toyota	LVS	IRW	TUS	TUS	CNS	SON	DCS	IOW	EVG	GTW; 3	MER	AAS	KCR	ISM		N/A	–	
2020	DGR-Crosley	4	Ford	LVS	MMP	MMP	IRW	EVG	DCS	CNS	LVS	AAS	KCR	**PHO**; 1					18th	98	
