= Mr. Devil =

Mr. Devil or Mr Devil could refer to:

- Ken Daneyko (born 1964), Ukrainian-Canadian hockey player nicknamed "Mr. Devil"
- Mr. Devil, the nickname for A. O. Neville in the 2002 Australian drama film Rabbit-Proof Fence
- Mr. Devil, a mountain wolf in the fictional African country of Bangalla in The Phantom
- "Mr Devil", a song on the 2008 album The Majority

== See also ==
- Devil, in several religions
- Señor Diablo, a character in Johnny the Homicidal Maniac
