= Full Scale (band) =

Australian band

- Also known as: Full Scale Deflection, Full Scale Revolution
- Origin: Perth, Western Australia, Australia
- Genres: Alternative metal, nu metal, rap metal
- Years active: 1998–2006; 2009–2010; 2016–present
- Labels: Popstar; Columbia
- Past members: see Members list below

Full Scale (formerly known as Full Scale Deflection, later known as Full Scale Revolution) is an Australian alternative metal band that formed in Perth, Western Australia during 1998. The band relocated to Melbourne in 2001.

Full Scale released two extended plays; Black Arrows and White Arrows both in 2003 on Popstar Records. They also released a self-titled studio album issued in 2005 on Columbia Records, Full Scale.

== History ==
Full Scale were formed in 1998 in Perth as Full Scale Deflection. By 1999, they consisted of Ezekiel the Ox on lead vocals, Nic Frey on drums, Chris Frey on bass guitar, Forrester Savell on synthesiser, and Jimmy Tee on guitar. They released the album, Symptoms of Chaos, on 11 November 2000. Nick and Chris Frey left the band and were replaced by Matt Crute (aka Crutey) on drums and Rob Kaay on bass guitar later in 2000. The band dropped the word Deflection from their name and then moved to Melbourne in 2001. Despite playing their original songs for some of their shows, they developed new music.

Kaay and Andrew McGuiness (a lawyer) formed a record label, Popstar Records, and Full Scale released their debut extended play, Black Arrows in March 2003. This was followed by a second EP, White Arrows in August. There was a brief line-up change; Tee left the band, being replaced by Tristan Ross for about six months. Under the management of Kaay, the band toured the east coast extensively.

According to Allmusic's reviewer, Johnny Loftus, "the band's hard-hitting, gristly sound – led by Ox's vocal seethe – caught the interest of American majors". By the end of the year, Tee rejoined and the band moved to Los Angeles where they were signed to Columbia Records (SonyBMG) and released their self-titled album, Full Scale, on 8 March 2005. After the album's release they toured the United States as the opening act for US rap rock band, Hed PE. Their tour of the United States came to an abrupt end following a lawsuit with another party who held the rights to the name Full Scale. The band were prevented from playing any further American shows until the lawsuit was resolved, and it was one of the contributing factors in their split with Columbia Records.

Upon returning to Australia, Crutey and Tee decided to play one last show with the band and Ben Brennan (Seven, Full Scale Revolution) played his first show with Full Scale on bass guitar at the Corner Hotel in Melbourne on 17 March 2006. Ox moved on to a new group, Mammal.

In January 2016 Ox and Tee announced that they were reforming the band with a new rhythm section of Chris Webber (Webbsy) and Leigh Miller. They announced February 2016 tour dates in Sydney, Melbourne and Perth.

The band released a new song entitled "Jurassic Graveyard" in January 2018, and embarked on a national tour of Australia. So far, no new album has yet been announced.

== After Full Scale ==
After Full Scale, Ox became the front man for Mammal, from March 2006, they released an EP, Mammal. Their single "Slaves" was produced by Ox's ex-bandmate Savell. They later released two albums (Vol 1: The Aural Underground and The Majority) and disbanded in 2009. He was the front-man of The Ox & the Fury with Brennan, Lucius Borich and Dom Italiano, as an alternate country music group. Ox also appeared in theatre, and produced music for hip hop groups. Ox later became the front man of Over-Reactor (based in Melbourne), which released their album, Lose Your Delusion.

Kaay became an author and entrepreneur. He used the business management skills he had acquired to build Full Scale into the band that was signed to Columbia Records to start his own Australian company. Right after Full Scale, he joined Sunk Loto in September 2006, until they broke up in December 2007. After that he worked with the Brown brothers for nearly two years on an unreleased project tentatively entitled, The Flood The Flood. Deciding to retire from the live-music-touring scene in 2008, Kaay released a series of books, Robkaay Journals. Vol. I, My Glorious Nightmare (2008), based on his recollections of his music career over a period of ten years. Vol. II followed in 2010 as This is what it's really like being in a band. He has also written two fantasy fiction novels, Silverbirch: A Tear in the Fabric of the Night Sky (2009) and Silverbirch: Fall of the Epicenter. His first Silverbirch novel cracked the Top 10 Amazon.com chart in its first week of release in the Science Fiction category. Kaay is now a successful entrepreneur running multiple businesses under his company Kaay.com.au.

Crutey ran the Saltar Hype booking agency in Melbourne, and played in different projects (one with Ben Brennan) as well as appearing with Ox in The Ox and The Fury. As of 2009, he was the drummer for the Tim McMillan Band.

Tee played for the US band Helmet for a short stint, playing live for a handful of shows. He was the guitarist for the heavy rock band, Sleeping Giant, which formed in 2010 in Perth.

Savell has produced records by Dead Letter Circus, Karnivool, The Butterfly Effect and Human Nature. He was nominated as Producer of the Year at the ARIA Music Awards of 2009 for Karnivool's Sound Awake. He continued to work with Ox on the project, Smash Nova.

Chris Frey (from the original F.S.D.) is a film maker working in Melbourne. He was a video director for Karnivool's "Set Fire to the Hive" which was nominated for 'Australian Music Video of the Year' at the 2009 J Awards. He also directed two film clips for Ox's band Mammamal, for "Smash the Pinata" and "The Majority".

In 2008 Colour, Light, Movement, Sound!, a documentary on Full Scale's journey from Perth to America and their subsequent demise, was released on DVD. The DVD contains a bonus disc called Bootleg which contains live clips from assorted shows in the band's career. The release of the DVD was marked with a launch party at Melbourne's Hi-Fi Bar. Ezekiel Ox, Jimmy Tee, Crutey and Rob Kaay attended the launch party, and came on stage at the end of the night to give their thanks and to take one last bow for their fans.

In 2010, Jimmy Tee and Rob Kaay were asked to reform Full Scale, but both declined. A new band, with Ezekiel Ox, Crutey, Tristan Ross and Ben Brennan were formed in Melbourne for a single short tour, as Full Scale Revolution. Proceeds from this tour went to the Refugee Action Collective. During this tour, Jimmy Tee played a song, "The Heimlich Manoeuvre", with Full Scale Revolution in Fremantle at the Newport Hotel on 6 June 2010.

== Members ==
Full Scale Deflection

- Ezekiel Ox – vocals (1998–2000)
- Chris Frey – bass guitar (1998–2000)
- Nic Frey – drums (1998–2000)
- Forrester Savell – synthesisers (1998–2000)
- Matt "Crutey" Crute – drums (2000)
- Jimmy Tee – guitar (1998–2000)
- Rob Kaay – bass guitar (2000)

Full Scale

- Matt Crute – drums (2000–2006)
- Ezekiel Ox – vocals (2000–2006)
- Rob Kaay – bass guitar (2000–2006)
- Jimmy Tee – guitar (2000–2003, 2003–2006)
- Tristan Ross – guitar (2003)
- Erin Tomadin - background harmonica (circa 2005)

== Discography ==
=== Albums ===
- Symptoms of Chaos (2000) (as Full Scale Deflection)
- Black Arrows (2003, Popstar Records)
- White Arrows (2003, Popstar Records)
- Full Scale (2005, Columbia Records)

=== Singles ===
- "Party Political" (2005)
- "Feel It" (2005)
- "Jurassic Graveyard" (2018)
