= Fred Catona =

Frederick P. Catona
- Died: May 31, 2016 (aged 70)
- Education: East Stroudsburg University of Pennsylvania
- Occupations: Advertising, radio marketing
- Website: www.fredcatona.com

Fred Catona was an American entrepreneur and founder of Radio Direct Response, a marketing company focused on radio campaigns, where his marketing campaigns helped to launch websites such as Priceline.com and FreeCreditReport.com. He later founded Bulldozer Digital, a direct-response advertising agency located in Blue Bell, Pennsylvania.

== Early career ==
After graduating from East Stroudsburg University of Pennsylvania with a degree in health and physical education, Catona worked as a high school health-science teacher and athletics coach at Akiba Hebrew Academy and Solomon Schechter Day School.

As a young adult, he opened a small business called “The Country Grocer” in Swarthmore, Pennsylvania. In 1983, he founded a mail-order food company called "A Taste of Philadelphia", which offered Philadelphia-area specialties to customers outside the region.

He also attempted to create a Philadelphia hoagie suitable for space travel in collaboration with astronaut Guion S. Bluford Jr. for the STS-8 mission, but the project was not included in the mission due to technical limitations.

== Life after mail-order ==
=== Radio Direct Response ===
In promoting his mail-order business, Catona observed the effectiveness of radio advertising for generating sales. He conducted radio interviews and coordinated advertising through commercials and promotional giveaways. Building on this experience, he developed a direct-response format for radio advertising. Businesses in the infomercial industry began to take notice of Catona's methods and sought his assistance to reach a wider audience. In 1993, Catona founded “Radio Direct Response”, the first advertising agency focusing exclusively on direct-response radio marketing. As the agency grew, he was approached by entrepreneur Jay Walker with an idea for a website where consumers could name their own price for airline tickets. Catona developed a campaign for this website, later known as Priceline.com, using William Shatner as a celebrity spokesperson. Within the first 18 months of its launch, Priceline.com generated approximately 1 billion dollars using direct-response radio. He also assisted with campaigns for FreeCreditReport.com and other companies in the direct-response advertising sector.

=== Direct response radio marketing ===
Direct-response radio marketing has been used since the 1920s, when advertisers began using radio to elicit immediate responses from consumers. Over time, the approach evolved, and some agencies began to specialize in full-service direct-response radio marketing.

The principals of direct response radio marketing are similar to all types of direct response marketing – direct offer to purchase direct from the manufacture, no middle man or broker. The theory is that because there is no middle men there will be lower pricing. For example, it is a common practice for a retail store to double the price for want they paid for a product before selling it to the public. Also chances are the retailer did not buy the product from a manufacture but rather from a broker who also had a mark-up on the product.

Direct response radio marketing usually works directly with manufacturers.

=== Later life ===
Catona was the founder and chief marketing strategist of Bulldozer Digital, an advertising agency utilizing both direct response radio advertising and Catona's newest development called “Digital Convergence Marketing”, which generates leads to maintain contact with clients potential customers.

He was active in community affairs, mentoring local entrepreneurs and service as a Big Brother.

Catona died on May 31, 2016, due to injuries sustained in a car accident.
