= Clay Andrews Racing =

Former NASCAR team

- Owner: Clay Andrews
- Series: Busch Series
- Race drivers: David Gilliland, Randel King
- Manufacturer: Chevrolet
- Opened: 2005
- Closed: 2006

Career
- Drivers' Championships: 0
- Race victories: 1

Clay Andrews Racing was a NASCAR Busch Series team. They formerly fielded the No. 84 Hype Technologies Chevrolet Monte Carlo in the NASCAR Busch Series. The team was led by Billy Wilburn, a former Penske Racing mechanic and later crew chief. They signed Randel King as their development driver. King was released from his contract once the team decided to close down. King then spent a few seasons racing for smaller development teams such as Position One Motorsports and other family run operations.

They picked up their first and only win with rookie David Gilliland in 2006 at the Meijer 300 at Kentucky Speedway. In July 2006, the team announced it had closed its doors, with plans to return in three years. The team has since formed the Clay Andrews Alliance Partners Organization, a group of independent NASCAR teams that share info and sponsorship funds.

== Car No. 84 results ==
NASCAR Busch Series results
Year	Driver	No.	Make	1	2	3	4	5	6	7	8	9	10	11	12	13	14	15	16	17	18	19	20	21	22	23	24	25	26	27	28	29	30	31	32	33	34	35	Owners	Pts
2005	David Gilliland	03	Chevy	DAY	CAL	MXC	LVS	ATL	NSH	BRI	TEX	PHO	TAL	DAR	RCH	CLT	DOV	NSH	KEN	MLW	DAY	CHI	NHA	PPR	GTY	IRP	GLN	MCH	BRI	CAL	RCH	DOV	KAN	CLT	MEM	TEX	PHO; 43	HOM		
2006	David Gilliland	84	Chevy	DAY	CAL; DNQ	MXC	LVS; 39	ATL	BRI	TEX; 29	NSH	PHO; 33	TAL	RCH; 30	DAR	CLT; DNQ	DOV	NSH	KEN; 1	MLW	DAY	CHI; 26	NHA	MAR; 36	GTY	IRP	GLN	MCH	BRI	CAL	RCH	DOV	KAN	CLT	MEM	TEX	PHO	HOM	51st	637
