= 2015 Windows 10 400 =

Race details
- Race 21 of 36 in the 2015 NASCAR Sprint Cup Series
- Date: August 2, 2015
- Location: Pocono Raceway in Long Pond, Pennsylvania
- Course: Permanent racing facility
- Course length: 2.5 miles (4 km)
- Distance: 160 laps, 400 mi (640 km)
- Weather: Mostly sunny skies with a temperature of 78 °F (26 °C); wind out of the west at 7 mph (11 km/h)
- Average speed: 132.159 mph (212.689 km/h)

Pole position
Driver	Kyle Busch	Joe Gibbs Racing
- Time: 50.444

Most laps led
Driver	Joey Logano	Team Penske
- Laps: 97

Winner
No. 20	Matt Kenseth	Joe Gibbs Racing

Television in the United States
- Network: NBCSN
- Announcers: Rick Allen, Jeff Burton and Steve Letarte
- Nielsen ratings: 2.5/5 (Overnight); 2.6/5 (Final); 4.3 Million viewers

Radio in the United States
- Radio: MRN
- Booth announcers: Joe Moore, Jeff Striegle and Rusty Wallace
- Turn announcers: Dave Moody (1), Mike Bagley (2) and Kyle Rickey (3)

The 2015 Windows 10 400 was a NASCAR Sprint Cup Series race held on August 2, 2015, at Pocono Raceway in Long Pond, Pennsylvania. Contested over 160 laps on the 2.5 mile (4 km) triangular superspeedway, it was the 21st race of the 2015 NASCAR Sprint Cup Series season. Matt Kenseth won the race, his second of the season. Brad Keselowski finished second. Jeff Gordon finished third. Dale Earnhardt Jr. and Greg Biffle rounded out the top five.

Kyle Busch won the pole for the race, led 19 laps, was leading the race before running out of fuel on the final lap and finished 21st. Joey Logano led a race high of 97 laps before running out of fuel with three laps to go and finished 20th. The race had 18 lead changes among 13 different drivers, eight caution flag periods for 32 laps and one red flag period that lasted for 14 minutes and 32 seconds.

This was the 33rd career victory for Matt Kenseth, second of the season, first at Pocono Raceway and tenth at the track for Joe Gibbs Racing. Kenseth left Pocono trailing Kevin Harvick by 118–points in the points standings. Despite being the winning manufacturer, Toyota left Pocono trailing Chevrolet by 75–points in the manufacturer standings. But they pulled to within one–point of Ford for second in the standings.

The Windows 10 400 was carried by NBC Sports on the cable/satellite NBCSN network for the American television audience. The radio broadcast for the race was carried by the Motor Racing Network and Sirius XM NASCAR Radio.

== Report ==
=== Background ===
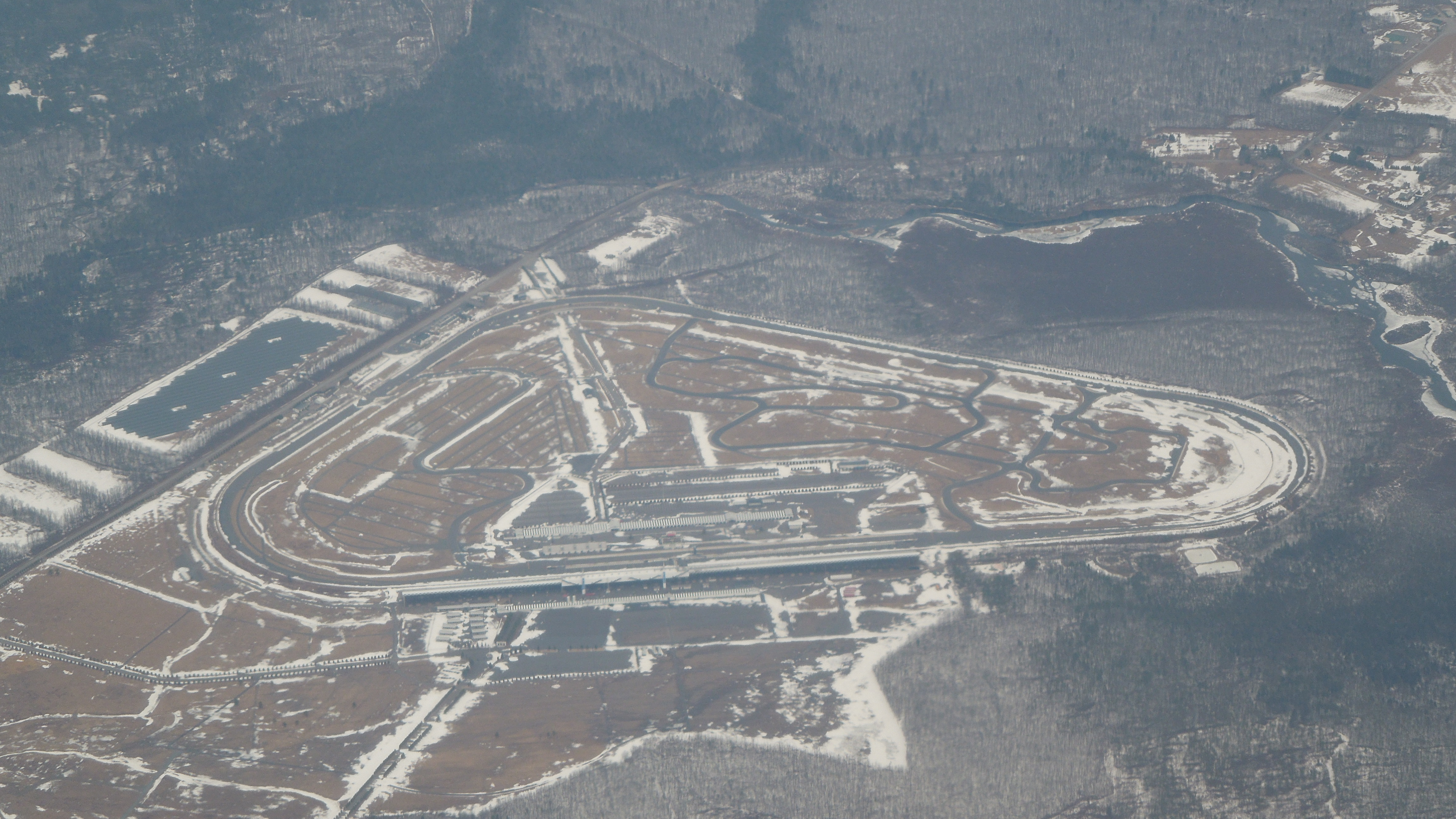
Pocono Raceway, the track where the race was held

Pocono Raceway (formerly Pocono International Raceway), also known as the Tricky Triangle, is a superspeedway located in the Pocono Mountains of Pennsylvania at Long Pond. Kevin Harvick entered Pocono with a 69-point lead over Joey Logano. Dale Earnhardt Jr. entered 100 back, Jimmie Johnson entered 102 back and Martin Truex Jr. entered 109 back.

==== Changes to the track ====
Following the Axalta "We Paint Winners" 400 in June, a section of the Tunnel Turn – turn 2 – about 170 ft (52 m) by 28 ft (8.5 m) was milled, leveled and repaved. This was done to eliminate the bumps that develop when the foundation for the track surface that goes over the tunnel the team haulers use to get in and out of the track settles into the ground.

==== Entry list ====
The entry list for the Windows 10 400 was released on Monday, July 27 at 11:20 a.m. Eastern time. Forty-three drivers were entered for the race. All were entered in the previous week's race at Indianapolis. There were three driver changes for this race. The No. 33 Hillman-Circle Sport LLC Chevrolet that was driven by Alex Kennedy. The Premium Motorsports duo swapped rides this weekend with Timmy Hill driving the No. 62 Chevrolet and Reed Sorenson driving the No. 98 Ford.

No.	Driver	Team	Manufacturer
1	Jamie McMurray	Chip Ganassi Racing	Chevrolet
2	Brad Keselowski (PC3)	Team Penske	Ford
3	Austin Dillon	Richard Childress Racing	Chevrolet
4	Kevin Harvick (PC1)	Stewart–Haas Racing	Chevrolet
5	Kasey Kahne	Hendrick Motorsports	Chevrolet
6	Trevor Bayne	Roush Fenway Racing	Ford
7	Alex Bowman	Tommy Baldwin Racing	Chevrolet
9	Sam Hornish Jr.	Richard Petty Motorsports	Ford
10	Danica Patrick	Stewart–Haas Racing	Chevrolet
11	Denny Hamlin	Joe Gibbs Racing	Toyota
13	Casey Mears	Germain Racing	Chevrolet
14	Tony Stewart (PC4)	Stewart–Haas Racing	Chevrolet
15	Clint Bowyer	Michael Waltrip Racing	Toyota
16	Greg Biffle	Roush Fenway Racing	Ford
17	Ricky Stenhouse Jr.	Roush Fenway Racing	Ford
18	Kyle Busch	Joe Gibbs Racing	Toyota
19	Carl Edwards	Joe Gibbs Racing	Toyota
20	Matt Kenseth (PC6)	Joe Gibbs Racing	Toyota
22	Joey Logano	Team Penske	Ford
23	J. J. Yeley (i)	BK Racing	Toyota
24	Jeff Gordon (PC7)	Hendrick Motorsports	Chevrolet
26	Jeb Burton (R)	BK Racing	Toyota
27	Paul Menard	Richard Childress Racing	Chevrolet
31	Ryan Newman	Richard Childress Racing	Chevrolet
32	Travis Kvapil (i)	Go FAS Racing	Ford
33	Alex Kennedy (R)	Hillman-Circle Sport LLC	Chevrolet
34	Brett Moffitt (R)	Front Row Motorsports	Ford
35	Cole Whitt	Front Row Motorsports	Ford
38	David Gilliland	Front Row Motorsports	Ford
40	Landon Cassill (i)	Hillman-Circle Sport LLC	Chevrolet
41	Kurt Busch (PC5)	Stewart–Haas Racing	Chevrolet
42	Kyle Larson	Chip Ganassi Racing	Chevrolet
43	Aric Almirola	Richard Petty Motorsports	Ford
46	Michael Annett	HScott Motorsports	Chevrolet
47	A. J. Allmendinger	JTG Daugherty Racing	Chevrolet
48	Jimmie Johnson (PC2)	Hendrick Motorsports	Chevrolet
51	Justin Allgaier	HScott Motorsports	Chevrolet
55	David Ragan	Michael Waltrip Racing	Toyota
62	Timmy Hill (i)	Premium Motorsports	Chevrolet
78	Martin Truex Jr.	Furniture Row Racing	Chevrolet
83	Matt DiBenedetto (R)	BK Racing	Toyota
88	Dale Earnhardt Jr.	Hendrick Motorsports	Chevrolet
98	Reed Sorenson	Premium Motorsports	Ford
Official initial entry list
Official final entry list

Key	Meaning
(R)	Rookie
(i)	Ineligible for points
(PC#)	Past champions provisional

== Practice ==
=== First practice ===
Brad Keselowski was the fastest in the first practice session with a time of 50.961 and a speed of 176.606 mph (284.220 km/h).

Pos	No.	Driver	Team	Manufacturer	Time	Speed
1	2	Brad Keselowski	Team Penske	Ford	50.961	176.606
2	20	Matt Kenseth	Joe Gibbs Racing	Toyota	51.038	176.339
3	11	Denny Hamlin	Joe Gibbs Racing	Toyota	51.059	176.267
Official first practice results

=== Second practice ===
Carl Edwards was the fastest in the second practice session with a time of 51.191 and a speed of 175.812 mph (282.942 km/h).

Pos	No.	Driver	Team	Manufacturer	Time	Speed
1	19	Carl Edwards	Joe Gibbs Racing	Toyota	51.191	175.812
2	20	Matt Kenseth	Joe Gibbs Racing	Toyota	51.306	175.418
3	18	Kyle Busch	Joe Gibbs Racing	Toyota	51.309	175.408
Official second practice results

=== Final practice ===
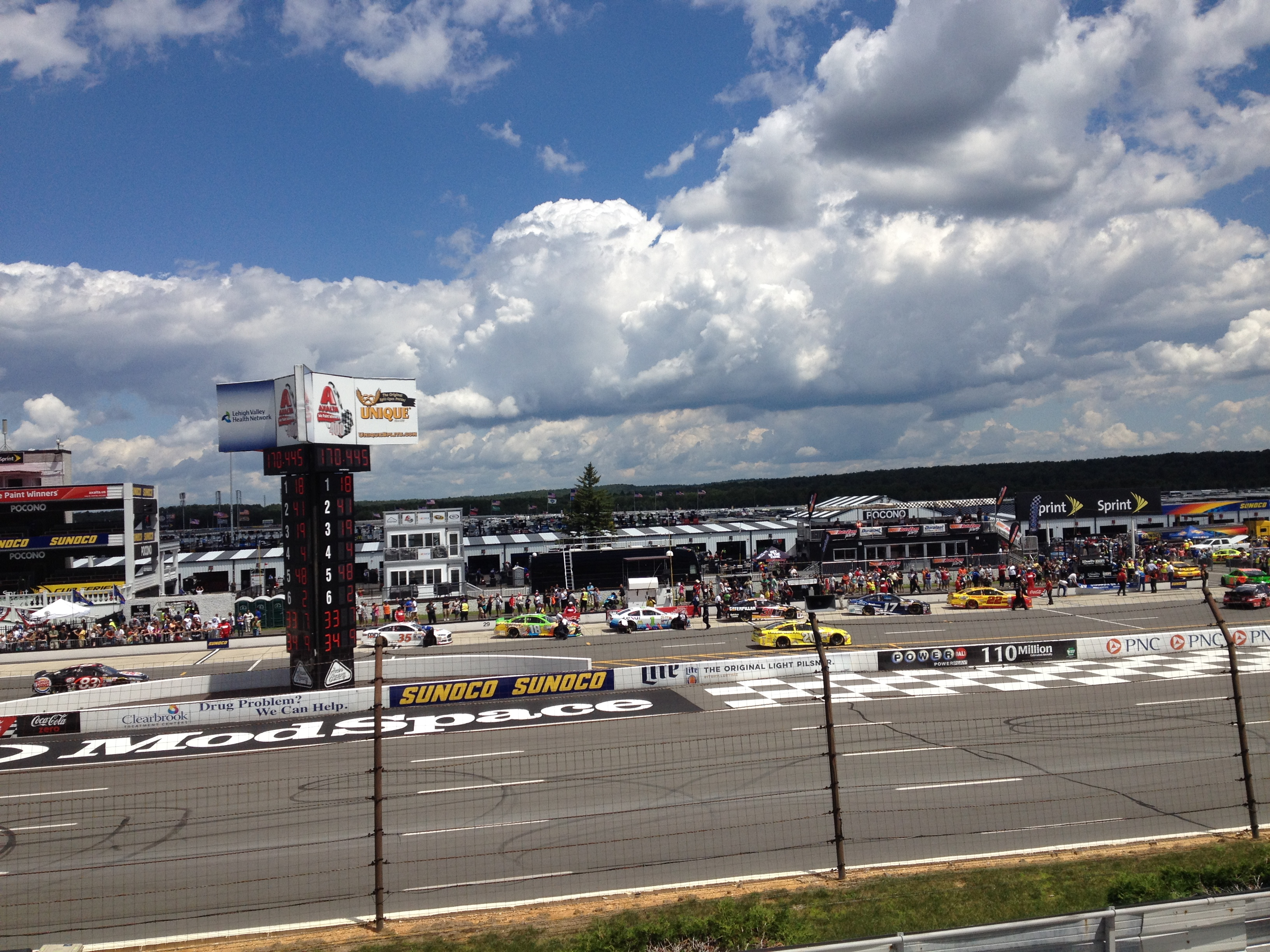
Final practice

Kyle Busch was the fastest in the final practice session with a time of 51.358 and a speed of 175.240 mph (282.021 km/h). Jeb Burton was forced to go to his backup car after wrecking into the inside pit road wall. Because this change took place after qualifying, he started the race from the rear of the field.

Pos	No.	Driver	Team	Manufacturer	Time	Speed
1	18	Kyle Busch	Joe Gibbs Racing	Toyota	51.358	175.240
2	41	Kurt Busch	Stewart–Haas Racing	Chevrolet	51.409	175.067
3	19	Carl Edwards	Joe Gibbs Racing	Toyota	51.452	174.920
Official final practice results

== Qualifying ==
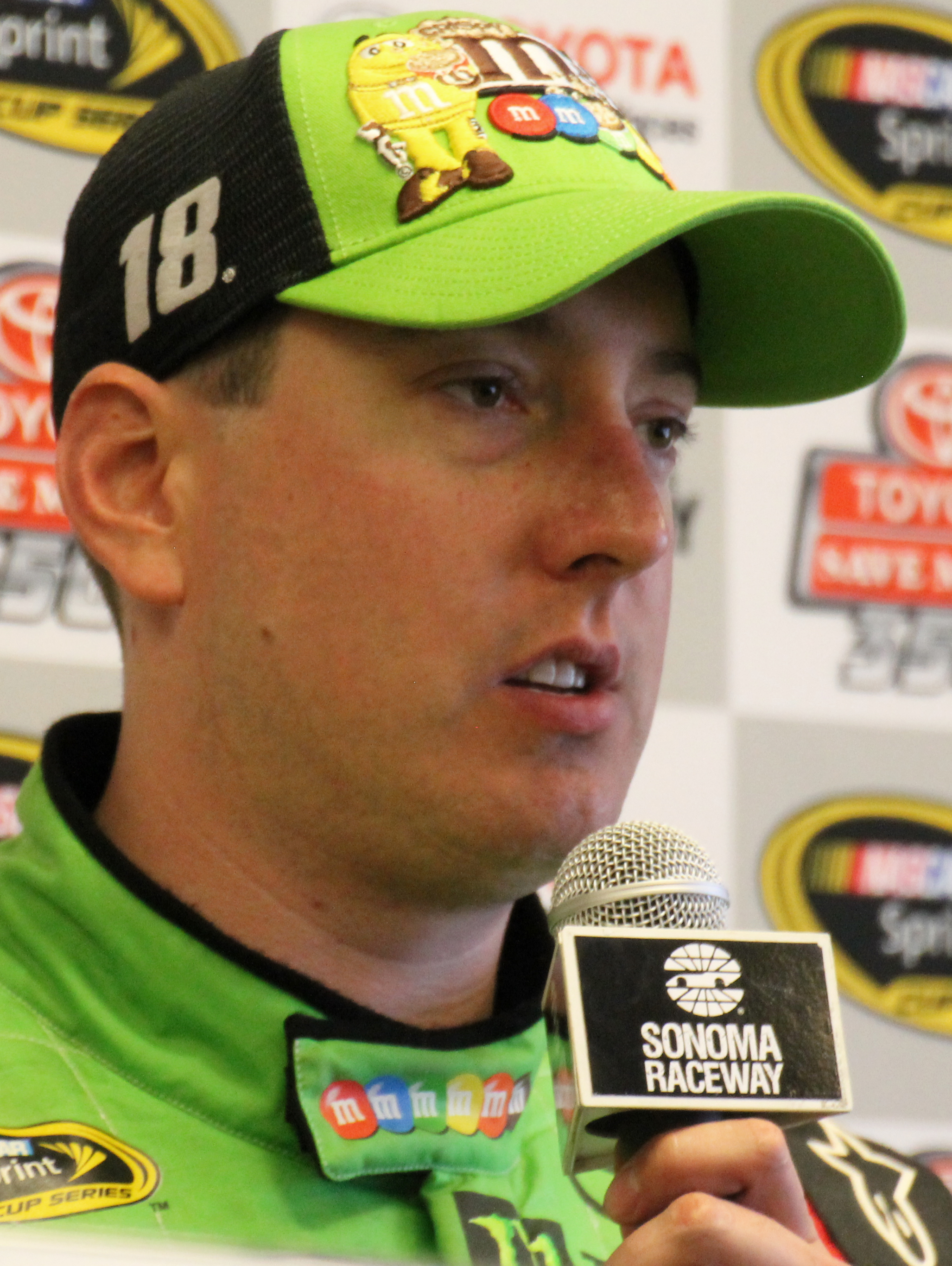
Kyle Busch, seen here at Sonoma Raceway, scored the pole for the race.

Kyle Busch won the pole with a time of 50.444 and a speed of 178.416 mph (287.133 km/h). “I told you I had a fast car, I just wasn’t sure we could get the balance right,” Busch said after winning the pole. “(Crew chief) Adam Stevens and these guys, they did it again.” “A lot of that lies on me for putting the lap together something I hadn’t done over the last couple of months,” Kevin Harvick said after qualifying second. “I feel like we all did a good job there and made some good adjustments. I feel like I probably gave up a little bit in Turn 1. I got a little bit tight in the center of that corner, but all-in-all it was a good lap and I’m glad we ran our fastest speed in the last round. That is what you have to do.” “Not bad,” Tony Stewart said after qualifying fifth. “ (Crew chief) Chad Johnston came over in between the practice session and qualifying and showed me some stuff where I was losing some time. That is what we focused on for qualifying and it worked.” “We were pretty good in that final round but not quite good enough to get the pole there,” said Brad Keselowski after qualifying ninth. “We were missing a little bit in one of the corners, but all-in-all a good effort. We had the fastest car in practice so I feel pretty good about that. It is similar to what we had at the Brickyard and we were really strong there but just needed a little more to win so I am optimistic about it for sure.” “We really struggled for whatever reason in Turn 1 today,” said Martin Truex Jr. after qualifying 13th “Just can’t seem to get the balance right. We were either too tight or too loose no matter what we do. Fought the same thing there, not a big deal though I think we will be okay. We’ve got plenty of time to figure it out tomorrow. We’ve got a few cars to pass, but 13th is not too bad. We did it last week.”

=== Qualifying results ===
Pos	No.	Driver	Team	Manufacturer	R1	R2	R3
1	18	Kyle Busch	Joe Gibbs Racing	Toyota	51.107	50.859	50.444
2	4	Kevin Harvick	Stewart–Haas Racing	Chevrolet	50.869	50.665	50.514
3	22	Joey Logano	Team Penske	Ford	51.201	50.720	50.608
4	3	Austin Dillon	Richard Childress Racing	Chevrolet	50.894	50.945	50.659
5	14	Tony Stewart	Stewart–Haas Racing	Chevrolet	50.762	50.826	50.667
6	41	Kurt Busch	Stewart–Haas Racing	Chevrolet	51.005	50.777	50.672
7	20	Matt Kenseth	Joe Gibbs Racing	Toyota	51.463	50.882	50.691
8	19	Carl Edwards	Joe Gibbs Racing	Toyota	51.164	50.702	50.750
9	2	Brad Keselowski	Team Penske	Ford	50.952	50.888	50.764
10	24	Jeff Gordon	Hendrick Motorsports	Chevrolet	51.037	50.877	50.787
11	11	Denny Hamlin	Joe Gibbs Racing	Toyota	51.140	50.785	50.833
12	48	Jimmie Johnson	Hendrick Motorsports	Chevrolet	51.158	50.914	50.948
13	78	Martin Truex Jr.	Furniture Row Racing	Chevrolet	51.107	51.007	—
14	31	Ryan Newman (Note: Ryan Newman started the race from the rear of the field after changing rear-end gears.)	Richard Childress Racing	Chevrolet	51.261	51.030	—
15	88	Dale Earnhardt Jr.	Hendrick Motorsports	Chevrolet	51.241	51.038	—
16	5	Kasey Kahne	Hendrick Motorsports	Chevrolet	51.294	51.060	—
17	1	Jamie McMurray	Chip Ganassi Racing	Chevrolet	51.264	51.061	—
18	27	Paul Menard	Richard Childress Racing	Chevrolet	51.237	51.153	—
19	15	Clint Bowyer	Michael Waltrip Racing	Toyota	51.376	51.202	—
20	10	Danica Patrick	Stewart–Haas Racing	Chevrolet	51.205	51.262	—
21	43	Aric Almirola	Richard Petty Motorsports	Ford	51.423	51.390	—
22	47	A. J. Allmendinger	JTG Daugherty Racing	Chevrolet	51.315	51.409	—
23	6	Trevor Bayne	Roush Fenway Racing	Ford	51.500	51.504	—
24	55	David Ragan	Michael Waltrip Racing	Toyota	51.198	51.524	—
25	16	Greg Biffle	Roush Fenway Racing	Ford	51.510	—	—
26	13	Casey Mears	Germain Racing	Chevrolet	51.614	—	—
27	42	Kyle Larson	Chip Ganassi Racing	Chevrolet	51.621	—	—
28	7	Alex Bowman	Tommy Baldwin Racing	Chevrolet	51.723	—	—
29	40	Landon Cassill (i)	Hillman-Circle Sport LLC	Chevrolet	51.771	—	—
30	9	Sam Hornish Jr.	Richard Petty Motorsports	Ford	51.803	—	—
31	51	Justin Allgaier	HScott Motorsports	Chevrolet	51.895	—	—
32	34	Brett Moffitt (R)	Front Row Motorsports	Ford	51.924	—	—
33	35	Cole Whitt	Front Row Motorsports	Ford	51.949	—	—
34	17	Ricky Stenhouse Jr.	Roush Fenway Racing	Ford	51.971	—	—
35	23	J. J. Yeley (i)	BK Racing	Toyota	52.125	—	—
36	83	Matt DiBenedetto (R)	BK Racing	Toyota	52.137	—	—
37	38	David Gilliland	Front Row Motorsports	Ford	52.171	—	—
38	26	Jeb Burton (R) (Note: Jeb Burton started the race from the rear of the field after switching to his backup car post-qualifying.)	BK Racing	Toyota	52.283	—	—
39	46	Michael Annett	HScott Motorsports	Chevrolet	52.364	—	—
40	32	Travis Kvapil (i)	Go FAS Racing	Ford	52.448	—	—
41	98	Reed Sorenson	Premium Motorsports	Chevrolet	53.477	—	—
42	33	Alex Kennedy (R)	Hillman-Circle Sport LLC	Chevrolet	54.051	—	—
43	62	Timmy Hill (i)	Premium Motorsports	Ford	54.486	—	—
Official qualifying results

== Race ==
=== First half ===
==== Start ====
The race was scheduled to start at 1:46 p.m., but started four minutes later when Kyle Busch led the field to the green flag. The first caution of the race flew on the fifth lap when Kasey Kahne got loose on the frontstretch coming out of turn 3, slid down the track and slammed into the inside wall lining pit road. This was in an almost identical manner to what happened to Jeb Burton in final practice the day before. “Well, first of all I couldn’t believe I was clear over here this late in the corner and then all the way to the left heading towards pit wall,” Kahne said. “Then I saw the people and I thought to myself that those guys need to take off running and get out of the way. I didn’t know. I hadn’t done anything like that before so it was kind of crazy the way it all happened.” Kahne was uninjured, and he was released from the infield care center a few minutes later, but his car was damaged beyond repair, resulting in a last-place finish. The race was red-flagged to allow NASCAR to evaluate and repair the wall. After a 14-minute and 43 second delay, the red flag was withdrawn and the field continued under caution.

The race restarted on lap 10. The second caution of the race flew on lap 16. This was a scheduled competition caution after a section of the track was washed down following the previous day's ARCA race. A few cars opted not to pit and Kevin Harvick assumed the race lead. A. J. Allmendinger was tagged for an uncontrolled tire and restarted the race from the tail-end of the field.

The race restarted on lap 20. The third caution of the race flew the same lap when Harvick blew an engine in turn 3. This was his first DNF since the last year's Duck Commander 500 at Texas Motor Speedway. “"Coming off of Turn 2, I knew I had some issues and didn't realize they were going to be that big, but all in all, just really proud of my team," Harvick said. "Car was fast. You'll have days like this."

The race restarted on lap 24. The fourth caution of the race flew on lap 28 when Sam Hornish Jr. cut down a left-front tire in turn 1 and got rear-ended by Ricky Stenhouse Jr., who then slammed the wall. "Everything was happening real fast," said Stenhouse, who walked away uninjured. "I saw the 9 (Hornish) in Turn 3 run up the track and I thought he just got loose and everything was fine, but getting into Turn 1 the car in front of me ducked out at the last minute and there was the 9 sitting and I got on the brakes really hard. I think it got on the splitter, and (I) couldn't go left or right and just ran right into him. It is not a good day for us. I guess the 9 missed a shift or something and I wasn't aware of it until the 35 (Cole Whitt) or one of the other cars pulled out real quick, and there was the 9 sitting there. By the time I reacted, it was just too late and I ran right back into him." "It is one of those days," Hornish said. "I missed a shift on a restart, which wasn't any good, and then we had a tire come apart and then we got hit and then that deal right there (with Busch). Kurt was trying to hold on to it and I saw that he got it straightened back out, and it is one of those things where everything stops smoking long enough that you think he has it back under control again and then it is just wobbling around on him. Unfortunate for us, for sure. ... I love coming to Pocono and I have had some good runs here and led laps and felt like we could win races, but it just hasn't been for us this year. Hopefully that doesn't carry on to Watkins Glen next weekend."

==== Second quarter ====
The race restarted on lap 34 with defending Pocono winner Martin Truex Jr. out in front. He made his first stop on lap 39 and gave the lead to Joey Logano. Jimmie Johnson pitted from second on lap 44. Logano ducked onto pit road on lap 52 and handed the lead to Kyle Busch. He surrendered the lead to pit the next lap and handed it to teammate Denny Hamlin. Dale Earnhardt Jr. was tagged for speeding on pit road and was forced to serve a drive-through penalty. Hamlin pitted from the lead on lap 55 and handed it to Brad Keselowski. He pitted on lap 57 and handed the lead to Jeff Gordon. The No. 2 was tagged for an uncontrolled tire after colliding with his tire carrier and was forced to serve a drive-through penalty. Gordon pitted on lap 59 and handed the lead to Danica Patrick. The uncontrolled tire from the No. 2 pit stall brought out the fifth caution of the race on lap 62. She pitted under the caution and the lead cycled back to Joey Logano. Jeb Burton was tagged for speeding on pit road and restarted the race from the tail-end of the field.

The race restarted on lap 66. The sixth caution of the race flew the same lap when Kurt Busch got turned by Paul Menard and then t-boned by Sam Hornish Jr.

The race restarted on lap 72. The seventh caution of the race flew the same lap when Dale Earnhardt Jr. made contact with Cole Whitt in turn 1 and went spinning.

=== Second half ===
==== Halfway ====
The race restarted on lap 76. Busch pitted from second on lap 88 and started a round of green flag stops. Logano pitted the next lap and gave the lead to Matt Kenseth. He gave up the lead to pit the next lap and handed it to Kyle Larson. The eighth caution of the race flew on lap 91 when Alex Kennedy backed into the wall in turn 1. Clint Bowyer was caught off by the caution and pitted when pit road was closed. As a result, he restarted the race from the tail-end of the field. Larson pitted under the caution and handed the lead to Joey Logano.

The race restarted on lap 98. The field settled into a green flag run until lap 123 when Joey Logano surrendered the lead to pit. This handed the lead to Denny Hamlin. He pitted the next lap and handed the lead to David Ragan. He ducked onto pit road with 35 laps to go and handed the lead to Greg Biffle. Brett Moffitt was tagged for speeding on pit road and was forced to serve a drive-through penalty. Biffle hit pit road with 34 laps to go and handed the lead to Jeff Gordon. Casey Mears was tagged for having too many men over the wall and was forced to serve a drive-through penalty. Gordon surrendered the lead to pit with 33 laps to go and the lead cycled back to Joey Logano.

==== Final ten laps ====
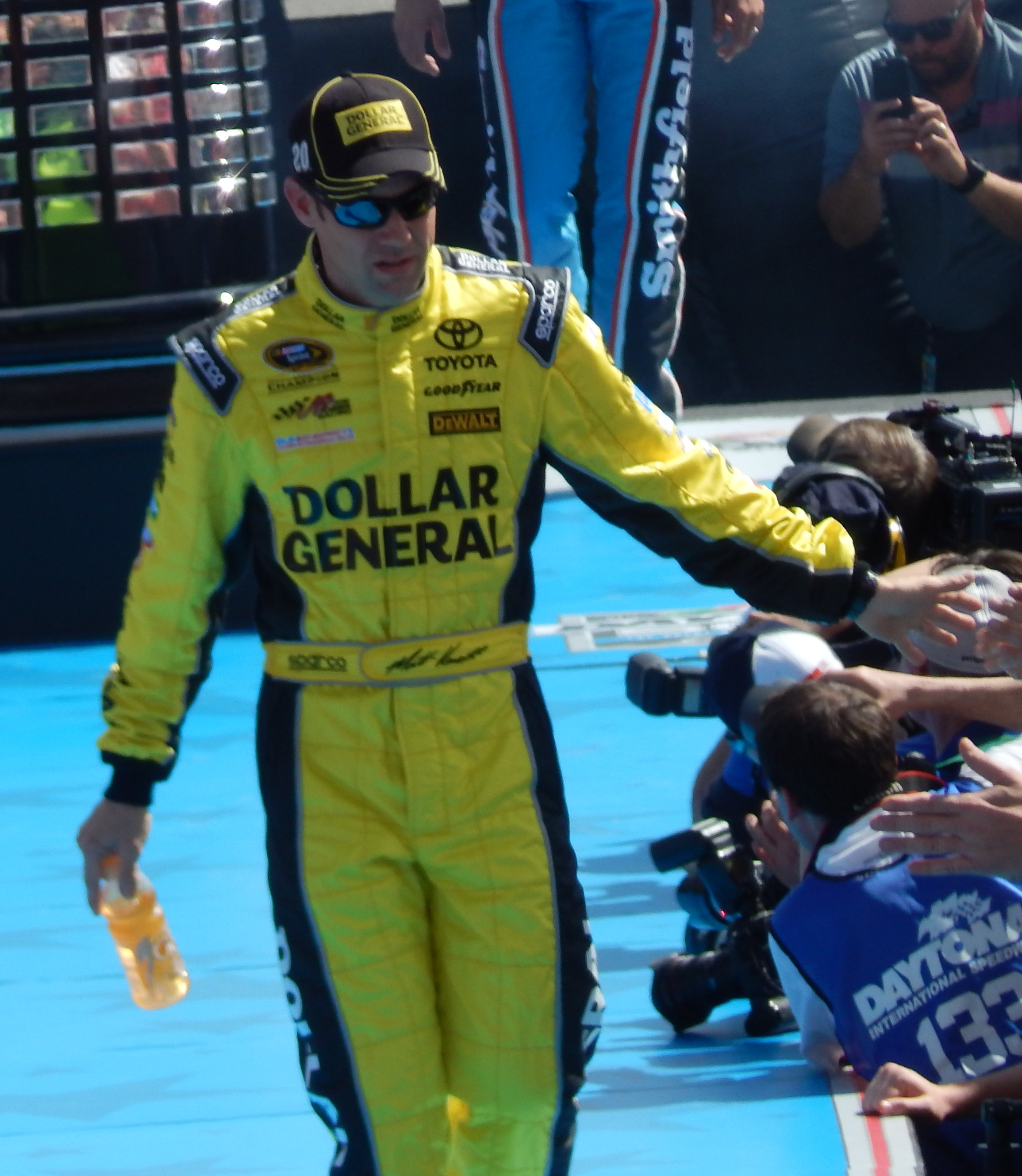
Matt Kenseth, seen here at the 2015 Daytona 500, scored the 33rd victory of his career at Pocono.

Logano maintained a one-second lead over Kyle Busch with ten laps to go with a chance of being short on fuel. Ultimately, he ran out of fuel on the Long Pond Straightaway with three to go and Busch took over the lead. About a lap later, Truex ran out of fuel as well. On the last lap, Busch too ran out of fuel on the front–stretch, was passed by Matt Kenseth – who had taken the white flag 15 seconds behind Busch – in turn 2 and went on to take the checkered flag.

== Post-race ==
=== Driver comments ===
“It feels good to get one today,” said Kenseth. “There’s nothing like wins. I never thought I’d ever win at Pocono and I never thought I’d win a fuel mileage race, so we did both today.” “I guess our numbers, from what (crew chief) Todd (Gordon) said, was good enough to make it by a half a lap,” said Joey Logano after running out of gas and finishing 20th. “I was saving fuel just to cushion it. I thought I was going to be good and then I started running out and knew we weren’t going to make it. It was tough. We did everything right today.”

After running into his tire carrier on lap 57 and serving a drive–through penalty for an uncontrolled tire that sent him back to 37th, Brad Keselowski rallied back to a runner–up finish. "The fuel came into play at the end and we were able to take care of it to bring home second, which is a very respectable day," Keselowski said. "Certainly not where we were going to finish without the fuel, but that is sometimes how it works. I think my teammate and his team did a phenomenal job. I am heartbroken for them to not win the race."

Jeff Gordon, who was running 16th with four laps to go, took advantage of the cars running out of fuel to finish third – matching his best finish of the season – in his 46th and final career start at Pocono Raceway. "I thought we were trying to get maybe 10th or 12th and all of a sudden they said, 'You're third,' and I think I was probably the most shocked person out there on the racetrack when I found that out," Gordon said after the race. "I knew cars were peeling off, but I just didn't realize that many were either running out or coming to pit road."

Teammate Dale Earnhardt Jr. was 17th with four to go and rallied to a fourth-place finish. "We've just got to work harder," he said. "Our car wasn't very good all weekend in the corner. We had a lot of balance issues we never really cured. That held us up. We weren't as good as we were here earlier this year. But still, it was a top-10, top-five car, but just barely a top-five car. I thought we had a good enough car to win here when we came here earlier in the summer, but we lost a little balance."

== Race results ==
Pos	No.	Driver	Team	Manufacturer	Laps	Points
1	20	Matt Kenseth	Joe Gibbs Racing	Toyota	160	47
2	2	Brad Keselowski	Team Penske	Ford	160	43
3	24	Jeff Gordon	Hendrick Motorsports	Chevrolet	160	42
4	88	Dale Earnhardt Jr.	Hendrick Motorsports	Chevrolet	160	40
5	16	Greg Biffle	Roush Fenway Racing	Ford	160	40
6	48	Jimmie Johnson	Hendrick Motorsports	Chevrolet	160	38
7	47	A. J. Allmendinger	JTG Daugherty Racing	Chevrolet	160	37
8	15	Clint Bowyer	Michael Waltrip Racing	Toyota	160	36
9	14	Tony Stewart	Stewart–Haas Racing	Chevrolet	160	35
10	19	Carl Edwards	Joe Gibbs Racing	Toyota	160	34
11	27	Paul Menard	Richard Childress Racing	Chevrolet	160	33
12	42	Kyle Larson	Chip Ganassi Racing	Chevrolet	160	33
13	3	Austin Dillon	Richard Childress Racing	Chevrolet	160	31
14	40	Landon Cassill (i)	Hillman-Circle Sport LLC	Chevrolet	160	0
15	1	Jamie McMurray	Chip Ganassi Racing	Chevrolet	160	29
16	10	Danica Patrick	Stewart–Haas Racing	Chevrolet	160	29
17	55	David Ragan	Michael Waltrip Racing	Toyota	160	28
18	43	Aric Almirola	Richard Petty Motorsports	Ford	160	26
19	78	Martin Truex Jr.	Furniture Row Racing	Chevrolet	160	26
20	22	Joey Logano	Team Penske	Ford	160	26
21	18	Kyle Busch	Joe Gibbs Racing	Toyota	159	24
22	11	Denny Hamlin	Joe Gibbs Racing	Toyota	159	23
23	31	Ryan Newman	Richard Childress Racing	Chevrolet	159	21
24	51	Justin Allgaier	HScott Motorsports	Chevrolet	159	20
25	7	Alex Bowman	Tommy Baldwin Racing	Chevrolet	159	19
26	46	Michael Annett	HScott Motorsports	Chevrolet	159	18
27	35	Cole Whitt	Front Row Motorsports	Ford	159	17
28	13	Casey Mears	Germain Racing	Chevrolet	159	16
29	83	Matt DiBenedetto (R)	BK Racing	Toyota	159	15
30	23	J. J. Yeley (i)	BK Racing	Toyota	159	0
31	34	Brett Moffitt (R)	Front Row Motorsports	Ford	158	13
32	32	Travis Kvapil (i)	Go FAS Racing	Ford	158	0
33	38	David Gilliland	Front Row Motorsports	Ford	158	11
34	98	Reed Sorenson	Premium Motorsports	Chevrolet	157	10
35	26	Jeb Burton (R)	BK Racing	Toyota	157	9
36	62	Timmy Hill (i)	Premium Motorsports	Ford	156	0
37	41	Kurt Busch	Stewart–Haas Racing	Chevrolet	150	8
38	33	Alex Kennedy (R)	Hillman-Circle Sport LLC	Chevrolet	126	6
39	9	Sam Hornish Jr.	Richard Petty Motorsports	Ford	123	5
40	6	Trevor Bayne	Roush Fenway Racing	Ford	91	4
41	17	Ricky Stenhouse Jr.	Roush Fenway Racing	Ford	27	3
42	4	Kevin Harvick	Stewart–Haas Racing	Chevrolet	20	3
43	5	Kasey Kahne	Hendrick Motorsports	Chevrolet	3	1
Official Windows 10 400 results

=== Race statistics ===
- 18 lead changes among 13 different drivers
- 8 cautions for 32 laps; 1 red flag for 14 minutes, 32 seconds
- Time of race: 3 hours, 1 minute, 36 seconds
- Average speed: 132.159 mph (212.689 km/h)
- Matt Kenseth took home $233,601 in winnings

Lap Leaders
Laps	Leader
1-16	Kyle Busch
17-19	Kevin Harvick
20-32	Kyle Busch
33-38	Martin Truex Jr.
39-51	Joey Logano
52	Kyle Busch
53-54	Denny Hamlin
55-57	Brad Keselowski
58-62	Danica Patrick
63-87	Joey Logano
88-93	Kyle Larson
94-123	Joey Logano
124	David Ragan
125-126	Greg Biffle
127-128	Jeff Gordon
129-157	Joey Logano
158-159	Kyle Busch
160	Matt Kenseth

Total laps led
Leader	Laps
Joey Logano	97
Kyle Busch	19
Kurt Busch	13
Martin Truex Jr.	6
Kyle Larson	5
Danica Patrick	5
Brad Keselowski	3
Kevin Harvick	3
Matt Kenseth	2
Jeff Gordon	2
Greg Biffle	2
Denny Hamlin	2
David Ragan	1

==== Race awards ====
- Coors Light Pole Award: Kyle Busch (50.444, 178.416 mph (287.133 km/h))
- 3M Lap Leader: Joey Logano (97 laps)
- American Ethanol Green Flag Restart Award: Joey Logano
- Duralast Brakes "Bake In The Race" Award: Kyle Busch
- Freescale "Wide Open": Dale Earnhardt Jr.
- Ingersoll Rand Power Move: Jeff Gordon (15 positions)
- MAHLE Clevite Engine Builder of the Race: Toyota Racing Development #20
- Mobil 1 Driver of the Race: Joey Logano (128.7 driver rating)
- Moog Steering and Suspension Problem Solver of The Race: Brad Keselowski (crew chief Paul Wolfe (0.674 seconds))
- NASCAR Sprint Cup Leader Bonus: No winner: rolls over to $180,000 at next event
- Sherwin-Williams Fastest Lap: Kyle Busch (Lap 77, 51.129, 176.025 mph (283.285 km/h))
- Sunoco Rookie of The Race: Matt DiBenedetto

== Media ==
=== Television ===
NBC Sports covered the race on the television side. Rick Allen, Jeff Burton and Steve Letarte had the call in the booth for the race. Dave Burns, Mike Massaro, Marty Snider and Kelli Stavast handled pit road on the television side.

NBCSN
Booth announcers	Pit reporters
Lap-by-lap: Rick Allen; Color-commentator: Jeff Burton; Color-commentator: Steve Letarte	Dave Burns; Mike Massaro; Marty Snider; Kelli Stavast

=== Radio ===
MRN had the radio call for the race, which was simulcast on Sirius XM NASCAR Radio. Joe Moore, Jeff Striegle and four time Pocono winner Rusty Wallace called the race from the booth when the field was racing down the front stretch. Dave Moody called the race from a billboard outside of turn 1 when the field was racing through turn 1. Mike Bagley called the race from a billboard outside of turn 2 when the field was racing through turn 2. Kyle Rickey called the race from a billboard outside of turn 3 when the field was racing through turn 3. Woody Cain, Glenn Jarrett and Steve Post worked pit road on the radio side.

MRN
Booth announcers	Turn announcers	Pit reporters
Lead announcer: Joe Moore; Announcer: Jeff Striegle; Announcer: Rusty Wallace	Turn 1: Dave Moody; Turn 2: Mike Bagley; Turn 3: Kyle Rickey	Woody Cain; Glenn Jarrett; Steve Post

== Standings after the race ==
Drivers' Championship standings

	Pos	Driver	Points
	1	Kevin Harvick	780
	2	Joey Logano	734 (–46)
	3	Dale Earnhardt Jr.	717 (–63)
	4	Jimmie Johnson	713 (–67)
	5	Martin Truex Jr.	694 (–86)
	6	Brad Keselowski	681 (–99)
	7	Matt Kenseth	662 (–118)
1	8	Jamie McMurray	631 (–149)
1	9	Kurt Busch	620 (–160)
1	10	Jeff Gordon	617 (–163)
1	11	Denny Hamlin	614 (–166)
1	12	Paul Menard	591 (–189)
1	13	Ryan Newman	584 (–196)
1	14	Clint Bowyer	574 (–206)
1	15	Kasey Kahne	559 (–221)
	16	Carl Edwards	553 (–227)

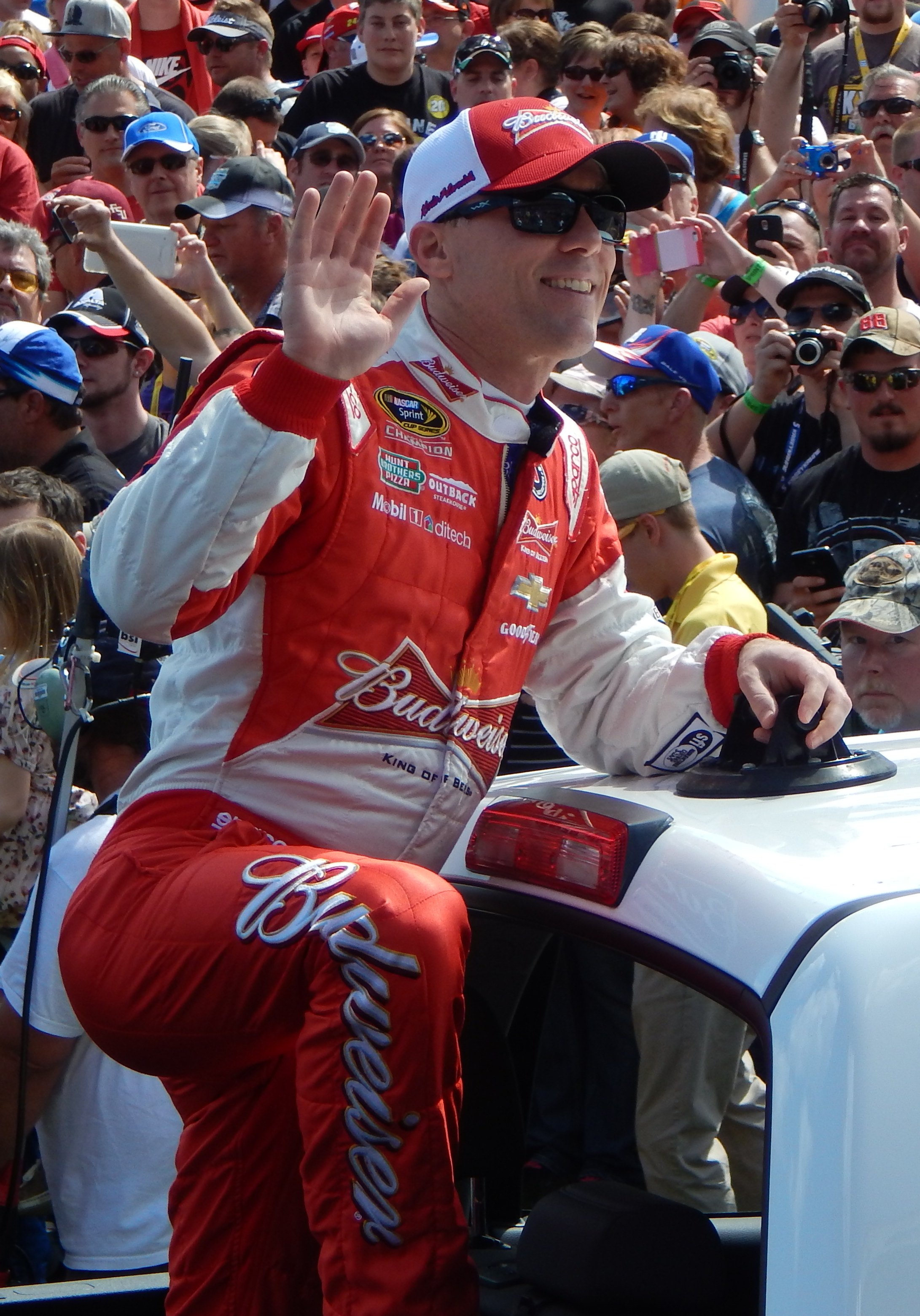
Kevin Harvick left Pocono with a 46–point lead over Joey Logano.

Manufacturers' Championship standings

Pos	Manufacturer	Points
1	Chevrolet	938
2	Ford	864 (–74)
3	Toyota	863 (–75)

- Note: Only the first sixteen positions are included for the driver standings.

== Notes ==
Previous race: 2015 Brickyard 400	Sprint Cup Series; 2015 season	Next race: 2015 Cheez-It 355 at The Glen
