= White Arrows (EP) =

EP by Full Scale
- Released: 2003
- Genre: Funk rock, funk metal, alternative metal
- Label: Popstar Records
- Producer: Forrester Savell

Full Scale chronology
Black Arrows (2003)	White Arrows (2003)	Full Scale (2005)

White Arrows is a 2003 EP by the Australian band Full Scale, released with the band's other EP, Black Arrows. The EPs were produced by Forrester Savell, and were released through Popstar Records. All of the songs except "Yellow Brittle" were re-released on the band's album, Full Scale.

== Track listing ==
- "Party Political" - 3:57
- "Empty Texas" - 4:07
- "Here Comes The Weekend" - 3:17
- "Smiles" - 3:15
- "Yellow Brittle"
- "Five-Six" - 5:31
