= Full Scale (album) =

Album by Full Scale

Studio album by Full Scale
- Released: 2005
- Genre: Funk rock, funk metal, alternative metal
- Label: Columbia Records
- Producer: Forrester Savell

Full Scale chronology
White Arrows (2003)	Full Scale (2005)

Full Scale is the self-titled 2005 album by Australian band Full Scale, featuring re-recorded songs from the EP White Arrows as well as brand new songs. The tracks "Party Political", "Empty Texas", "Here Comes The Weekend", "Smiles", and "Five-Six" are from White Arrows, and "Feel It" is taken from the Black Arrows EP. The rest are new songs.

== Track listing ==
1. "Empty Texas" - 4:07
2. "Feel It" - 4:31
3. "Smiles" - 3:15
4. "Sixteen Today" - 4:01
5. "Party Political" - 3:57
6. "Rapture" - 2:37
7. "The Heimlich Manoeuvre" - 3:36
8. "Sickness" - 4:49
9. "Manifesto" - 3:14
10. "Here Comes the Weekend" - 3:17
11. "Download the Destruction" - 4:25
12. "Five-Six" - 5:31
