= FreeCreditScore.com =

Website operated by Experian

FreeCreditScore.com, FreeCreditReport.com and Credit.com are websites owned by Experian Consumer Direct, a subsidiary of the credit bureau Experian. The sites offer users their personal credit reports from Experian on the condition that they sign up for Experian's Triple Advantage credit monitoring program for a fee. The credit report also comes with the user's PLUS credit score. The membership may be canceled with no charge within 7 days of signup by contacting the call center.

== Controversy ==
FreeCreditReport.com as well as its affiliate site FreeCreditScore.com has been the subject of two major lawsuits. In 2005, the site's owner, Experian Consumer Direct, was sued by the Federal Trade Commission for deceptive marketing tactics. They settled for $950,000 in the form of free credit monitoring for those affected and agreed not to use deceptive and misleading claims about free offers and to offer full disclosure of terms and conditions of any free offers. The penalty was largely seen as ineffective since it amounted to a small fraction of the $72 million annual advertising budget for FreeCreditReport.com. They were further subjected to a 2006 inquiry by the Florida Attorney General for violating Florida's Deceptive and Unfair Trade Practices Act. An MSNBC.com investigation of the website called it "misleading", "deceptive" and a "scam". The program has also been identified as a scam by ConsumerFraudReporting.org.

Disclaimer banner added to commercials in response to controversy surrounding the company's deceptive billing practices.

The advertising practices of FreeCreditReport.com were specifically addressed in the Credit CARD Act of 2009. Now any company who advertises a “free credit report” on TV or radio must include the statement: "This is not the free credit report provided for by Federal law." The law also calls for the Federal Trade Commission to issue new rules that will force free credit report advertisers to inform consumers that the only place for a free credit report is AnnualCreditReport.com.

== Advertising ==
=== Singing ad campaign ===
In October 2007, Experian Consumer Direct began airing an advertising campaign featuring singer Eric Violette as a man struggling with difficult life circumstances due to his poor credit score, and his ignorance of it. The commercials feature jingles written using various distinctive forms of popular music. To date the company has aired nine different commercials, which have aired in different orders in different markets. The commercials featuring Violette and his band stopped airing in February 2010, as a new band was brought in. In June 2012, the original band returned in new commercials for FreeCreditScore.com as a part of a "comeback" campaign.

The themes/motifs of the commercials include, in order:

- Pirate-themed seafood restaurant
- Living with in-laws
- Used car
- Bicycle riding
- Rockstars pool party
- Renaissance fair
- Roller coaster
- Small town / cell phone shop
- Country bar in Reno

Most feature references to the original "Pirate" commercial; either lyrically, or by including it as part of the background. Most also feature an elderly woman, who in the later commercials is disapproving of the group.

Violette was born June 12, 1981, in Montreal and attended the National Theatre School of Canada in 2002. The commercials prepared by The Martin Agency began appearing in October 2007. Due to Violette's Canadian French accent, his voice was dubbed by the song's composer, David Muhlenfeld. He earlier did a Sirius Satellite Radio commercial in French.

When asked about his character by the Washington Post, Violette said that "He's a guy who has a lot of dreams and hopes. But he's not able to make them concrete because I think he's a little bit lazy. He's the kind of guy who always has bad luck . . . but I'm sure he has a good heart."

The commercials have spawned various homages including many parodies on YouTube. MADtv parodied the ads in a sketch that featured a young man cursed by bad luck after getting a credit card in his senior year of high school. After racking up $80,000 in debt, he ends up in jail, escapes and eventually winds up living with a skinhead named Fang "in a soggy cardboard box".

In response to the commercials, the Federal Trade Commission produced two public service announcements to remind citizens of the right to annual free credit reports from annualcreditreport.com.

=== Freecreditscore band campaign ===
In May 2010 a nationwide band search began to find the new face of freecreditscore.com. Live auditions were held in New York, Chicago and Los Angeles. Bands could also submit videos of themselves online at freecreditscoreband.com for consideration. Many were typical entries, but some bands, apparently as a joke, submitted videos as well, most notably Comparative Anatomy. In August 2010 The American Secrets (Formerly known as "Victorious Secrets", but changed the name to avoid any possible legal issues with Victoria's Secret) were named the new FCS Band. The band features Daniel Zott of JR JR.

Unlike the first band, who sang about finding themselves in bad credit situations, the new band sang instead about other people in bad credit situations, while simply being part of the background.

=== Original band returns ===
On June 15, 2012, freecreditscore.com released a new commercial that featured the return of the original band.

FCS Commercial Themes:

- "New Spot"- featuring the band gone and regrouping, with all members now financially well off. The "used sub-compact" from the used car commercial, is now pimped out, and the scene from the earlier commercial is reprised. The band is stopped at a light next to attractive women in a red Mustang convertible, but this time, instead of laughing at them as in the previous commercial, the women are now interested because of their financial success.
- "Set It Off"- featuring the band talking about receiving score alerts from the FCS app. The commercial also featured the return of the elderly lady, who frequented the band's older commercials.
