= Mammal (band) =

Australian band

- Origin: Melbourne, Australia
- Genres: Hard rock, funk rock, alternative metal, rap metal
- Years active: 2006–2009, 2017–present
- Label: None / Shock
- Members: Ezekiel Ox; Pete Williamson; Zane Rosanoski; Kade Turner
- Website: Official website

Mammal are an Australian band that formed in March 2006. Mammal rose up the ranks of the Australian music scene very quickly. Their first self-titled EP was recorded soon after the band came together. Their debut live album "Vol:1 The Aural Underground" was recorded just 4 months after the band started touring at a sold-out show at The Evelyn Hotel on 2 February 2007. Mammal also released a single titled "Slaves/Nagasaki in Flames" AA side, featuring 3 songs. Mammal entered the studio on 21 April 2008 to begin recording their debut studio album, The Majority which was released in August 2008. It peaked at No. 51 on the ARIA Albums Chart in early September. Some of the band's songs, including Hell Yeah!, New Breed Judas and Slaves, received regular airplay on Australian radio station Triple J.

== History ==
=== 2006 ===
Mammal began in March 2006 when former Full Scale frontman Ezekiel Ox joined up with old friend Pete Williamson (of Pete Murray's Stonemasons) who had already been working on some songs with bass player Nick Adams, the two had needed a vocalist and with Zeke everything came together. The trio soon found drummer Zane Rosanoski and the official Mammal line-up was complete. Mammal began playing all the shows they could very soon after forming, which were very well received by audiences and started to gain a fast-growing fan base. In mid-2006 they entered the Sing Sing Studios to record their self-titled debut EP, which was very popular and the fanbase kept growing.

=== 2007 ===
Mammal continued to play many gigs in 2007 and on 2 February they recorded their debut live album "Vol 1: The Aural Underground" which was released on 1 September. They began to find themselves on the bills at some of the country's biggest music festivals and playing more gigs than ever. They also released their single titled "Slaves/Nagasaki in Flames" which had a live version of "Hollywood Shrine". Mammal began work on material for their debut studio album on 20 November.

=== 2008–2009 ===
The band continued to play many shows at the beginning of 2008 and were fast becoming one of Australia's biggest bands, with a solid reputation as a live band. They performed at the Melbourne "Big Day Out" and they opened for Kiss at their Brisbane show in February. They entered "Sing Sing Studios" on 21 April to begin recording their new studio album, which was released on 30 August 2008. The released album was called The Majority and it debuted at No. 51 on the ARIA Albums chart. and at No. 2 on the independent AIR chart. Their single "Smash the Piñata" was placed on rotation by Triple J. and its accompanying video clip received high rotation on UK TV music channel "Scuzz TV". Mammal also played at Bassinthegrass 2007 and again in 2008 on 24 May. Mammal undertook 3 tours in the last 6 months of 2008 - the first in support of "Smash the Pinata", the first single from the debut album, the second an album launch tour, and the third, and final, more extensive run including some regional/coastal shows as a proper tour for "The Majority". Mammal finished 2008 by winning Best Live Band at the Music Oz awards for independent bands. The band played at the 2009 Peaches and Cream Festival on the Murray River. In 2009, Mammal performed at all Australian dates on the Big Day Out Festival tour, undertook several national tours, including a two-week UK tour with sold-out shows in London, Manchester and Glasgow. They were writing material for a second studio album before later disbanding. A live CD/DVD, "Vol 2: Systematic/Automatic" was released on 5 September, and were planning to tour the UK with The Answer, famed for touring with AC/DC.

=== Break up ===
On October 31, 2009, Mammal announced via newsletter that all touring had been canceled and they had split up, releasing the statement: "Due to long standing personal, political, musical and business differences, Mammal has decided it cannot continue and is no more..." It is believed that a fan who broke the drum skin of the kick drum during their set at the Dogs Bollix, Auckland, led to turmoil within the band, leading to this break up.

=== Reunion (2017–present) ===
Mammal released a statement on 8 August 2017 announcing that they were playing their first show after almost 8 years scheduled for Fri, 27 October 2017 in Melbourne. Following the sold-out performance at Melbourne's Max Watts, the band announced a small tour for late December.

In May 2018, Mammal released their first new material since 2009, the digital double-A side single "Community". A film clip was also released for the title track, and the song "Virtue Signalling", which had been played live on the band's December tour the previous year, was also released. The band also announced a tour to take place from June through to September.

=== Related projects ===
Ezekiel Ox plays in Over-Reactor, Full Scale, and Superheist as well as leading his solo rock project "Ezekiel Ox".

Pete Williamson and Zane Rosanoski formed a blues-rock band, Black Devil Yard Boss, with Michael "Big D" Davids on bass.

Nick Adams joined up with Hugo Tremayne, formerly of K-Oscillate, and Ben Ellingworth, formerly of MM9, in the electronic/rock band, Sub Atari Knives. He also plays in Warflags, Machine Gun Tongues and is session bass player for Clairy Browne.

Zane Rosanoski plays in East York.

== Line up ==
- Ezekiel Ox – vocals
- David Bleus – guitar
- Zane Rosanoski – drums, percussion
- Kade Turner – bass guitar

Former members

- David Ward - drums
- Nick Adams – bass guitar

== Discography ==
=== Studio albums ===
List of studio albums, with selected chart positions
| Title | Album details | Peak chart positions |
| Title | Album details | AUS |
|---|---|---|
| The Majority | Released: August 2008; Format: CD; Label: Shock (MAMMAL004) | 51 |

=== Live albums ===
List of live albums, with selected details
| Title | Details |
|---|---|
| Vol 1: The Aural Underground | Released: August 2007; Format: CD; Label: MGM (MAMMAL002) |
| Vol 2: Systematic/Automatic | Released: September 2009; Format: CD; Label: MGM |

=== Extended plays ===
List of EPs, with selected details
| Title | Details |
|---|---|
| Mammal | Released: March 2007; Format: CD; Label: MGM |

=== Singles ===
List of singles, with selected details
| Title | Year | Album |
|---|---|---|
| "Slaves/Nagasaki in Flames" | 2007 | non album single |
| "Smash the Piñata" | 2008 | The Majority |
| "The Majority" | 2008 | The Majority |
| "Community" | 2018 | Community (Single) |
| "Dead" | 2018 | Dead (Single) |
| "Crime Scene" | 2022 | Crime Scene (Single) |
| "The War" | 2022 | The War (Single) |
