= Mammal (EP) =

Mammal [EP]

EP by Mammal
- Released: 2006
- Recorded: 2006
- Genre: Hard rock, funk
- Length: 21:06
- Label: MGM

Mammal chronology
Mammal [EP] (2006)	Vol 1: The Aural Underground (2007)

Mammal is the self-titled debut extended play (EP) by Australian hard rock band, Mammal from 2006. The band sold the EP independently at their live shows and on their website until early 2007 when they signed with Metropolitan Groove Merchants (MGM) to distribute it independently. The original version (no longer in print) was replaced by the MGM version, released in March. The EP peaked into the top 20 of the AIR Charts.

== Background ==
Mammal formed in Melbourne, Australia in March 2006 when vocalist Ezekiel Ox (ex-Full Scale Deflection, Full Scale) joined guitarist Pete Williamson (ex-Pete Murray & the Stonemasons) who was writing songs with session bass guitarist, Nick Adams; the trio were joined by drummer, Zane Rosanoski. In mid-2006, they entered the Sing Sing Studios to record their self-titled debut five-track Extended Play (EP), Mammal, which was sold independently at their live shows and on their website. By early 2007, they signed with Metropolitan Groove Merchants (MGM) which distributed their EP from March, which peaked into the top 20 of the AIR Charts.

On 2 February, they recorded a live performance at the Evelyn Hotel and released their first live album, Vol 1: The Aural Underground in August. For this album, all five tracks from the EP had been recorded live with five additional tracks.

== Track listing ==
Australian CD EP MAMMAL001 [MGM/Independent Version]

All tracks are written by Mammal members as noted

Mammal
No.	Title	Length
1.	"New Breed Judas" (Pete Williamson, Alan Davies, Nick Adams, Zane Rosanoski)	3:19
2.	"Think" (Williamson, Davies, Adams, Rosanoski)	3:43
3.	"Hell Yeah" (Williamson, Davies, Adams, Rosanoski)	3:13
4.	"Inciting" (Williamson, Davies, Adams, Rosanoski)	3:41
5.	"Groove Junkie" (Williamson, Davies, Adams, Rosanoski)	7:10
