= Black Arrows (EP) =

EP by Full Scale
- Released: 2003
- Genre: Funk rock, funk metal, alternative metal
- Label: Popstar Records
- Producer: Forrester Savell

Full Scale chronology
Symptoms of Chaos (2000)	Black Arrows (2003)	White Arrows (2003)

Black Arrows is a 2003 EP by the Australian band Full Scale, released with the band's other EP, White Arrows (EP). The EP's were produced by Forrester Savell, and were released through Popstar Records.

== Track listing ==
- "Crush" - 4:22
- "Where's Your Energy?" - 3:47
- "Feel It" - 5:06
- "Billy (Say What You're Feeling)" - 3:41
- "The Story To Tell Your Children" - 5:23
- "System Of Shame" - 4:32
