= The Majority =

Studio album by Mammal
- Released: 30 August 2008 (Australia)
- Recorded: 2008
- Genre: Hard rock, funk rock, alternative metal
- Length: 46:31
- Label: None / Distributed By MGM
- Producer: Eric Sarafin

Mammal chronology
Vol 1: The Aural Underground (2007)	The Majority (2008)	Vol 2: Systematic/Automatic (2009)

Professional ratings
Review scores
Source	Rating
Beat Magazine	(favourable) link
Rave	link
Rolling Stone	Dec 2008

The Majority is the debut full-length studio album by Mammal, released after a live album, Vol 1: The Aural Underground and a self-titled EP. Work began on the album on 20 November 2007 and recording commenced on 20 April 2008 with American producer/engineer Eric Sarafin who is known for his work with Ben Harper, Spearhead & Pharcyde. The first single, "Smash the Piñata", was released a month prior to the album. The Majority peaked at No. 51 on the ARIA Albums Chart and reached No. 1 on the related Hitseekers Albums and No.48 on the Top 100 Physical Albums charts in early September. For the album the group consisted of Nick Adams on bass guitar, Ezekiel Ox on vocals, Zane Rosanoski on drums and Pete Williamson on guitar.

== Track listing ==
1. "The Aural Underground" – 3:27
2. "Smash the Piñata" – 4:16
3. "Bending Rules" – 3:50
4. "The Majority" – 2:32
5. "Mr Devil" – 4:16
6. "Religion" – 5:15
7. "Clear Enough?" – 4:13
8. "Burn Out" – 2:44
9. "Hollywood Shrine" – 5:03
10. "Zero Infinity" – 3:35
11. "Living in Sin" – 7:21

=== Bonus DVD ===
The Majority was initially released as a CD+DVD digipak limited edition pressing. Limited copies pre-ordered from JB Hi-Fi also came signed by the band.

AUS limited edition MAMMAL004

1. "Smash the Piñata" (video)
2. "The Majority" (video)
3. "Nagasaki in Flames" (video – live from the HiFi)
4. "Think" (video – live from the HiFi)

== Charts ==
Chart performance for The Majority
Chart (2008)	Peak position
Australian Albums (ARIA)	51
