= Comparative Anatomy (band) =

American drum and bass band

- Origin: Charlottesville, VA, Virginia, U.S.
- Genres: Drum & bass, industrial, electrogrind, noisegrind, grindcore, experimental rock, experimental
- Years active: 2009 - 2011
- Label: Mind Flare Media
- Members: Sir Puffers Rabbinald the Third - Drum programming/sample programming/electronics/treble bass Ron Chickenbaby - Source recordings/bass On the Box - Live performance/interpretive dance/noise
- Website: http://www.myspace.com/comparativeanatomy

Comparative Anatomy is an experimental drum & bass band from Charlottesville, Virginia. Known for their elaborate costumes, absurd humor, simple but diverse textures and unique sound, the band has recently become known in the experimental and noise rock scenes for their outlandish performances. Their early work has been referred to by reviewers as a “patchwork, cut-up style” similar to bands like Mr. Bungle, but recently they have created their own unique sound with robotic sounding bass lines, frenzied loops of animal samples, and beat-focused drums. To date, they are the only band to consistently use animals for vocals, recording their sounds in a variety of settings and programming them to the music, often altering the sounds and layering them in their more recent work. This puts them in league with Caninus and Hatebeak, but takes the idea much further, incorporating various themes for different animals and a much larger variety of sounds.

== History ==
Comparative Anatomy started as an experiment in 2009 between the two main members, Sir Puffers Rabbinald the Third (University of Virginia professor and demonologist Stanley Stepanic) and Ron Chickenbaby (Addison Dodds). At this time the band name was not yet chosen. The original line-up went through several guitars and one real drummer, all of whom were eventually eliminated. After deciding to work alone, the group took a different route, eliminated guitars altogether and moved away from the quirky, death metal sound where they started as well as completely scrapping vocals. Their musical direction began to take an experimental, drum & bass approach utilizing special tuning, a drum machine, and various samples from a variety of sources. At the time, the band was not aware of acts like Lightning Bolt and White Mice. It wasn't until they started to tour that they learned of their existence.

They officially chose their name in March 2009, which was intended to sound "like we were trying to be death metal but couldn't pick cool enough words to do it." In April of the same year, after working on their image to further flesh out their goofy approach, Comparative Anatomy performed their first show in Charlottesville, Virginia at a small venue called The Outback Lodge in an effort to see how their sound was taken by local crowds. Following this and moderate success in their hometown, the group performed with such acts as Deicide and Absu in death metal festivals before deciding to move their direction towards experimental music. Both members indicated at this time that the decision was mainly due to the large gap between their sound and traditional death metal, as well as a growing fan base that was primarily art and experimental music focused. During this process, the band completely altered its image with more elaborate costumes and a live act that includes silent films themed to match each song that follow the music down to the smallest beats. One reviewer of a live performance described it as "going to Chuck E. Cheese and laughing a lot while being moderately disturbed".

== Style ==
Comparative Anatomy use only two bass guitars for the main lines of their music, one referred to as the 'treble bass' due to its unusual tuning, special amplifier, settings, and pedals. Sir Puffers typically keeps his bass tuned higher than Ron Chickenbaby's, restricting himself to simple structures and chords. This is then offset with the other bass guitar, complex drum programming, and samples. Ron Chickenbaby plays what is referred to as the 'bass bass', a five-string which is tuned a variety of ways depending on the song, though they tend to play on octaves. Other instruments in recent work include grand pianos, church organs, and a variety of source-recorded objects. One of the biggest differences between Comparative Anatomy and other acts, however is that they never sing. Vocals were replaced early on with source recordings of animals, which the band admitted was due to "the fact that [they] can't play and sing at the same time". This is perhaps the most distinct piece of their music, creating a strange landscape of animal sounds along with their grind-styled riffs. Each song follows a particular animal, and sounds from each animal are used in its particular song. Their songs also often incorporate clips from popular culture, programmed along with the drum patterns to create odd, driving landscapes of screeching animals, bizarre electronics, eccentric humor, and textured bass lines.

Their first release, Mammalia (album) was mainly an experiment according to the band, especially in their usage of animal samples. Earlier work featured on this album tends to contain noise-ridden drums at points and sampling used in a more linear fashion. The animal sounds, for example, are largely unedited source recordings, so they often include a small amount of tape hiss and background noise. Later work, however, as exemplified by songs such as 'Nikuthoolak Arise' incorporate more atmospheric animal sounds along with linear patterns and source recordings from science fiction films of the 50s and factories, to name but a few. Their current output is much more dense than Mammalia, with deeper concepts and much more involved production time. Previously, the band has stated new songs would take them roughly one 2-3 hour session, but recent work has taken, on average, one month of 2-3 day sessions running 3 hours each week.

== Imagery ==
Comparative Anatomy focuses primarily on word-play and themes relating specifically to animals, often with an odd, absurdist bent. Songs often are bizarre plays on words that incorporate the particular animals they are about. On their Mammalia album, for example, 'My Voice is Horses' is a play on someone having a hoarse voice, but in essence makes no sense because of the spelling and plural form of the noun used. They're known for its odd humor, which relies heavily on absurdist and quasi-dadaist dialogs with the crowd and symbolism focusing totally on animals. Songs such as 'Owlien Syndrome' take hints from popular culture and utilize word combinations to create the themes, which are then carried further in the music. In this particular song, owl source recordings were altered to sound 'alien' and samples from 50s sci-fi films were utilized for more texture. Previous songs were more humorous, but though they've kept this same general level of humor, recently their work has been recognized by fans and critics as more detailed, mature, and demanding of the listener.

During live performances, Comparative Anatomy is known for wearing costumes, which were at first simple designs made with dismembered, stuffed animals, but eventually became elaborate and full-body pieces hand-made by the two main members featuring everything from top hats to black metal gauntlets. In addition, their live act involves a set of films and animations created by the band that follow the music and are projected behind them on a giant screen. Comparative Anatomy also has a mysterious entity referred to as 'On the Box', a "deranged" koala that is supposedly sexless and unable to speak. It previously included a live person playing the part, but they then scrapped the idea and have since left the character as an imaginary figure that occasionally appears online and in films.

Some of their older films have recently become retired and have been made publicly available by the band on their YouTube page. Thus far they have released 'Peter Rabbit the Great's Carrot Phalanx' and 'A Car Full of Seals in the Mall on the Day After Thanksgiving'. The former features clips from Watership Down, Wizards, and Russian cartoons. The latter features clips from The Blues Brothers and rally car wrecks, along with the typical cutout, patchwork art style particular to the band.

== Discography ==
=== Self released ===
- Mammalia Demo (CD-R, 2009)

=== With Mind Flare Media ===
- Mammalia (Spring 2010)
- Predatorial Rights (under production)

== External links and references ==
- http://www.myspace.com/comparativeanatomy MySpace
- https://web.archive.org/web/20100620143247/http://hookinmouth.net/index/2009/08/1st-annual-va-deathfest-coverage/ (Short review of the band from their performance at the 2009 Virginia Death Fest.)
- http://www.infernalmasquerade.com/?q=reviews/001044-comparative-anatomy-%E2%80%93-mammalia-2010 (Mammalia album review)
- http://brainwashed.com/index.php?option=com_content&view=article&id=8316:comparative-anatomy-qmammaliaq&catid=13:albums-and-singles&Itemid=96 (Brainwashed Review)
- http://www.facebook.com/pages/I-Love-Comparative-Anatomy/280497757932 (Facebook Fan Page)
- http://www.allmetalfest.com/hostile-city-death-fest-running-order/ (Hostile City Deathfest 2009 Information Page)
