= Vol 1: The Aural Underground =

Live album by Mammal
- Released: 26 August 2007 (Australia)
- Recorded: 2007
- Genre: Hard rock / Funk / Prog rock
- Length: 44:53
- Label: None / Distributed By MGM MAMMAL002

Mammal chronology
| Mammal [EP] (2006) | Vol 1: The Aural Underground (2007) | Slaves/Nagasaki in Flames (2007) |

Professional ratings
Review scores
| Source | Rating |
|---|---|
| Beat Magazine | (favourable) |

Vol 1: The Aural Underground is the first album by Mammal, recorded live at The Evelyn Hotel in their home town of Melbourne on 2 February 2007. Released and sold on their album launch tour, the album was then released in stores six days later.

== Track listing ==
1. "New Breed Judas" – 3:56
2. "Think" – 4:17
3. "Groove Junkie" – 6:48
4. "Two Soles" – 2:34
5. "Dionysian" – 4:08
6. "Push & Shove" – 5:37
7. "Maker" – 5:21
8. "Believe" – 4:21
9. "Inciting" – 4:00
10. "Hell hello Yeah" – 3:51
