= Throwing Little Stones =

Throwing Little Stones: The Best of The Mavis's

Compilation album by The Mavis's
- Released: 28 October 2002
- Recorded: 1990, 1995–2000
- Genre: Rock, pop, indie rock
- Length: 77:59
- Label: Festival Mushroom Records
- Producer: Kalju Tonuma, The Mavis's, Mark Saunders, Chris Scheri

The Mavis's chronology
Pink Pills (1998)	Throwing Little Stones: The Best of The Mavis's (2002)	Rapture (2003)

Throwing Little Stones: The Best of The Mavis's is a greatest hits album by Australian rock band, The Mavis's.

== Background and release ==
The Mavis's were formed in Ballarat in 1987, consisting of brother and sister Matt Thomas (vocals/guitar) and Beki Thomas (vocals/keyboard/percussion ) and school friends Andrea "Andi" Vendy (drums) and Kathryn McNulty (bass). They were joined by Nick on guitar in 1990 and a debut single "Rollercoaster"/"Witch Hunt" was released. In 1995, the band were signed to Mushroom Records and recorded their debut album Venus Returning. In 1998, the band released Pink Pills, which peaked at number 12 in Australia. The band subsequently toured with Green Day and Kylie Minogue.

In 1999, the band headed to the United States to work on their third album and released "Coming Home" and "Happiness" in 2000/2001, but conflict between the band and the record label arose and the two agreed to part ways late in 2001. Mushroom Records released Throwing Little Stones in 2002, compiling tracks from their two released studio albums and seven unreleased tracks.

== Track listing ==
1. "Thunder" – 3:30
2. "Coming Home" – 3:51
3. "Burst Into Space" – 4:25
4. "Cry" – 4:08
5. "Box" – 3:57
6. "Lost" – 4:01
7. "Lever" – 3:22
8. "Drive" – 4:35
9. "See-Saw" – 3:06
10. "Does It Matter" – 4:00
11. "Happiness" – 3:10
12. "Just a Little Shove" – 2:16
13. "Keeping Low" – 3:44
14. "Snow White Line" – 4:25
15. "Moon Drone Gold" – 3:08
16. "Do You Have a Brother?" – 2:53
17. "Puberty Song" – 3:52
18. "Naughty Boy" – 3:12
19. "Walk On By" – 3:21
20. "Planet Earth" – 4:22
21. "Roller Coaster" – 4:39

== Credits ==
- Josh Alexander – bass (tracks 1 to 20)
- Kathryn McNulty – bass (track 21)
- Andrea Vendy – drums
- Matt Thomas – guitar
- Nick Gill – guitar
- Matt Thomas – keyboards
- Becky Thomas – Farfisa organ
- Andrea Vendy – percussion

== Release history ==
Region	Date	Format	Label	Catalogue
Australia	28 October 2002	CD	Festival Mushroom Records	335872
