= 10 Years of Cheap Fame =

Compilation album by 28 Days
- Released: March 2007
- Genre: Punk rock, rap rock
- Label: Rebelscum Records

28 Days chronology
| Extremist Makeover (2004) | 10 Years of Cheap Fame (2007) | Lost Songs (2013) |

10 Years of Cheap Fame is a compilation album by Australian punk band 28 Days. It was released in March 2007. The album includes tracks from all four studio albums and three extended plays. The album was supported with a farewell tour.

== Track listing ==
All tracks are written by 28 Days

| No. | Title | Originally appeared on | Length |
|---|---|---|---|
| 1. | "Rip It Up" | Upstyledown | 3:39 |
| 2. | "Sucker" | Here We Go | 3:32 |
| 3. | "Say What" | Stealing Chairs | 3:40 |
| 4. | "Goodbye" | Upstyledown | 3:35 |
| 5. | "What's The Deal" | Stealing Chairs | 3:22 |
| 6. | "Take Me Away" | Stealing Chairs | 3:40 |
| 7. | "Song For Jasmine" | Upstyledown | 4:01 |
| 8. | "Deadly Like" | Upstyledown | 3:50 |
| 9. | "A General" | Stealing Chairs | 3:02 |
| 10. | "Birthday" | Extremist Makeover | 2:42 |
| 11. | "Use It" | Extremist Makeover | 3:02 |
| 12. | "Sand" | 28 Days | 2:17 |
| 13. | "Kool" | Kid Indestructible | 2:30 |
| 14. | "La Tune" | Kid Indestructible | 1:45 |
| 15. | "Boom" | Bring 'Em Back | 3:47 |
| 16. | "Gurl Guri Surfrider" (Hali Kali cover) | new recording | 4:46 |

== Release history ==
| Country | Date | Format | Label | Catalogue |
|---|---|---|---|---|
| Australia | 12 March 2007 | CD, digital download | Rebelscum Records | 28D0010 |
