= Is It Alive =

Live album by Bodyjar
- Released: February 27, 2007
- Recorded: Annandale Hotel Sydney
- Genre: Punk rock
- Length: 50:18
- Label: Shock Records
- Producer: Kalju Tonuma

Bodyjar chronology
Bodyjar (2005)	Is It Alive (2007)	Role Model (2013)

Is It Alive is a live album by punk rock band Bodyjar. The album was recorded from a live performance at the Annandale Hotel in Sydney while the band were on their "Call To Arms tour", named after their third song on their self-titled album from 2005 (Bodyjar).

The live show used for this album was originally recorded unbeknownst to the band as lead singer Cameron Baines describes, "We've always wanted to do a live album and by chance someone recorded the band in Sydney with out us even realizing."

The album cover for Is It Alive contains a water-pipe (or "bong"), alluding to the fact that the members of Bodyjar are recreational users of cannabis.

== Reviews ==
Matt Thrower from Rave magazine reviewed the album giving it a positive 3 out of 5 stars.

== Track listing ==
This is the track listing as printed on the disc.

All tracks are written by Bodyjar

No.	Title	Originally appeared on	Length
1.	"Sequel"	No Touch Red	3:09
2.	"Another Minute"	Bodyjar	3:19
3.	"Not the Same"	How It Works	3:31
4.	"You Say"	No Touch Red	4:16
5.	"Outside In"	Bodyjar	2:44
6.	"Lights Out"	Bodyjar	3:15
7.	"17 Years"	Jarchives: 10 Years of Bodyjar	2:13
8.	"Fall to the Ground"	How It Works	3:32
9.	"A Hazy Shade of Winter"	Singles and Stuff	2:59
10.	"Starting Over"	Bodyjar	2:58
11.	"Is It a Lie"	Plastic Skies	2:31
12.	"Too Drunk to Drive"	Plastic Skies	3:43
13.	"One In a Million"	Plastic Skies	3:03
14.	"Make a Difference"	Plastic Skies	2:38
15.	"Call to Arms"	Bodyjar	3:13
16.	"Wind Sok"	Rimshot!	3:07

== Personnel ==
=== Musicians ===
- Cameron Baines - vocals, guitar
- Tom Read - guitar, vocals
- Grant Relf - bass guitar, vocals
- Shane Wakker - drums

=== Technical ===
- Mixed by Kalju Tonuma at 101 Collingwood
- Recorded at the Annandale Hotel Sydney by Live Cast Production Studios, Sydney
- Mastered by Dave Walker
