= Insurge =

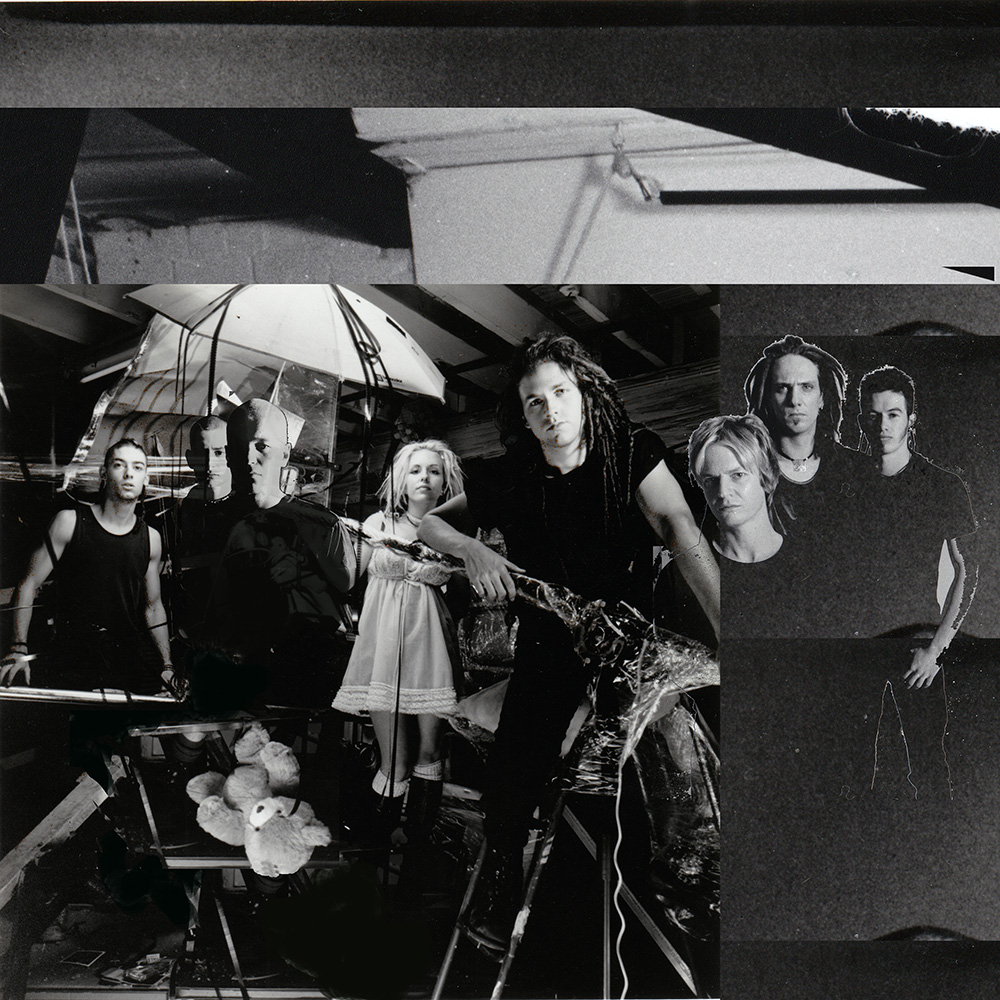
- Eight of the members of iNsuRge that played with the band for majority of the band's duration From left to right: Paul Bianco, Matt Richmond, Mattieu Macroth, Monique Wakelin, Chris Dubrow, Darryl Sims, Sean Burnett and Mark Avery

Background information
- Origin: Sydney, New South Wales, Australia
- Genres: Industrial rock, alternative rock
- Years active: 1994–2000, 2009
- Labels: Pesticide Records; Warner; Chatterbox Records
- Past members: Chris Dubrow; Mark Avery; Sean Burnett; Daryl Sims; Paul Bianco; Mattieu Macroth; Monique Wakelin; Matt Richmond; Adam Logan; Miguel Valenzuela; Jan Sebastian
- Website: www.myspace.com/insurgetheband

Insurge, stylised as iNsuRge, were an Australian political industrial rock band founded in 1994 by singer-songwriter-guitarist Chris Dubrow (ex-Soulscraper). Other founders were Mattieu MacRoth on bass guitar, Matt Richmond on drums, Paul Bianco on found Percussion and Monique Wakelin on keyboards. Their debut album Power to the Poison People was released in August 1996, which reached No.16 on the ARIA Albums Chart.

== Career ==
=== 1994–1995: Early years and EPs ===
The band's first release was the extended play I.M.F released in 1994 to coincide with the 50th anniversary of the International Monetary Fund. The song argued the I.M.F. based on its harsh economic measures were having a detrimental effect on the developing world. Initially a demo, I.M.F attracted the attention of prominent Australian music manager John Woodruff (The Angels, Icehouse, Baby Animals, Savage Garden) who helped pull together a distribution deal through EastWest records (Warner Music Australia). The original line up was then solidified with Monique Wakelin playing sampler, Mattieu McRoth on bass, Matt Richmond on electronic and acoustic Drums, and Paul Bianco on found Percussion joining Dubrow's guitar and vocals.

Just prior to the release of the band's second EP there was a shift in the line-up with original percussionist Paul Bianco leaving the band to be replaced by Miguel Valenzuela (who recorded much of the album 'Power to the Poison People') and later Adam Logan.

The band's second release was the EP Political Prisoners in 1995. Insurge worked with producer Kalju Tonuma, (The Mavis's, 28 Days, Bodyjar, Killing Joke). The title track became the band's breakthrough song, gaining considerable airplay from alternative radio across Australia and New Zealand. The lyrics discussed the inadequacy of modern criminal law, and the idea that most prisoners in western society were political prisoners because the concept of private property was an invention to protect the wealthy. The song went to No. 25 on the Triple J Hottest 100, 1995.

=== 1996–1998: "Speculator" and Power to the Poison People ===
In March 1996, the band released the single "Speculator", which was lyrically based on the anti-democratic power of global currency speculation. The track reached No. 57 on the ARIA singles chart, No. 7 on the 4ZZZ Hot 100 chart and No. 69 on the Triple J Hottest 100, 1996. The band's debut album Power to the Poison People was released in August 1996, and reached No. 16 on the ARIA albums chart. The singles "Soul 4 Sale", "Time Bomb" and "AK-47" followed.

The band toured constantly across Australia (and once to New Zealand) including tours with Pop Will Eat Itself and White Zombie, and participated in many festivals such as Alternative Nation Festival (1995), the Livid Festival (5 Oct 1996 – the same night Insurge programmed ABC TV's 'rage'), and the Big Day Out (1996, 1997).

In 1998, singer Chris Dubrow went to London to record tracks with Ian Richardson and Nick Coler (known for their work with The KLF). Dubrow also became involved with the Reclaim the Streets movement in both London and Sydney. Over this period the line-up changed again, Mark 'Milli' Avery became the bass player and Daryl Sims (formerly Indecent Obsession) was on drums, and Sean Burnett became the percussionist. This was the line up that recorded the Globalization album.

=== 1998-2000: Globalization and break up ===
In 1998, the band released "I Hate Stupid People" which achieved national airplay on Triple J. This was followed by the album Globalization, produced by Kalju Tonuma. The single "Feast or Famine" followed. Insurge announced their break-up in 2000 at their final show at the Newtown Festival, Sydney.

=== 2009-present: brief reunion and dissolution ===
In 2009, Insurge announced their reformation, albeit for a one-off reunion on 18 December 2009, before being inactive again.

Keyboardist and co-founding member Monique Wakelin died in 2018.

== Musical style and themes ==
Insurge combined samplers and audio loops with layers of acoustic and electronic drums and found percussion (such as old kitchen sinks and other scrap metal) mixed with punk/hard rock influenced guitars. The sound was influenced by alternative, industrial, goth, punk, EDM and Australian pub rock.

The band was known for its outspoken political views which were particularly focused on global issues such as injustice in the developing world, the political influence of corporations and financial markets, and global environmental issues such as climate change. The band's politics were influenced by anarchism, environmentalism, anarcho-punk, political economy, and the anti-globalization movement. The band expressed their political views through their lyrics, interviews and live appearances. Their first album's liner notes contains paragraphs of commentary on various political issues, as well as a list of books and websites favored by the band.

== Discography ==
=== Albums ===
Title	Year	Chart peak positions	Details
Title	Year	AUS	Details
Power to the Poison People	1996	16	Label: EastWest, Warner (0630156192); Format: CD
Globalization	2000	—	Label: Chatterbox (CB011); Format: CD

=== EPs ===
Title	Year	Chart peak positions	Details
Title	Year	AUS	Details
"I.M.F."	1994	158	Label: Pesticide (4509969832); Format: CD
"Political Prisoners"	1995	111	Label: Pesticide (0630-11445-2); Format: CD

=== Singles ===
Title	Year	Chart peak positions	Album
Title	Year	AUS	Album
"I.M.F. (Remixes)" Promo 12" release only	1994	—	Non-album single
"Speculator"	1996	57	Power to the Poison People
"Soul 4 Sale"	1996	109	Power to the Poison People
"Time Bomb"	1996	121	Power to the Poison People
"AK-47"	1997	—	Power to the Poison People
"I Hate Stupid People"	1998	102	Non-album single
"Feast or Famine"	1999	219	Globalization
