= Matt Doll =

Australian musician

- Born: Matthew James Thomas; 30 October 1969 (age 57); Geelong, Victoria, Australia
- Origin: Ballarat, Victoria, Australia
- Genres: Electropop; rock; new wave; synthpop; disco
- Occupations: Musician; singer-songwriter; producer; DJ
- Instruments: Vocals; guitar; percussion; bass guitar; programming
- Years active: 1987–present
- Label: Future 80's
- Website: facebook.com/TheMattDoll

Matthew James Thomas (born 30 October 1969), known professionally as Matt Doll, is an Australian musician, singer-songwriter and producer. He was the lead vocalist, rhythm guitarist and songwriter of the rock band, the Mavis's. He formed the group with his younger sister, Rebecca Thomas (Beki Thomas or Beki Colada), on vocals and keyboards in 1987. They released three studio albums, Venus Returning (July 1996), Pink Pills (April 1998) and Rapture (March 2003); however, they had already disbanded in December 2001. Subsequently, they have reformed in 2013, 2014 and 2018.

In 2005 he co-wrote and supplied the vocals for "Sleazy", the debut single by Dirty South. He has co-written with other artists including Jane Wiedlin and Charlotte Caffey of the Go-Go's. Doll has fronted other bands: the B-Dolls, the Blow Waves (2006–13, 2015–16), and Video Video. As a member of the Blow Waves, Doll explained the use of pseudonyms to Nick Bond of Star Observer, "They're all just nicknames. Mine's Matt Doll because of my last band, The B-Dolls…" In 2011 he co-wrote the Jane Badler album Opus with Byron St. John (of the Blow Waves). Badler covered his song, "Volcano Boy", for her album.
