= Tom Ugly =

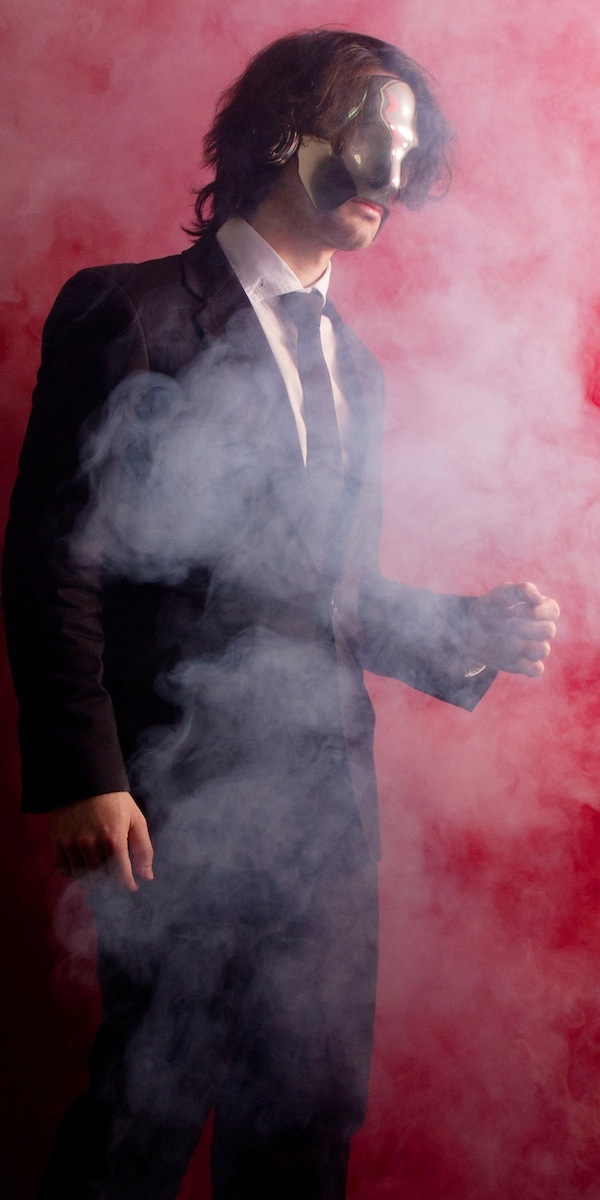

Background information
- Also known as: [is]
- Born: Tommaso Parisi; 1991 (age 34–35)
- Origin: Sydney, Australia
- Genres: Alternative rock; electronic; indie; underground
- Occupations: Musician; producer
- Instruments: Vocals; guitar; drums; synthesizer; moog; mellotron; theremin; bass guitar; programming
- Years active: 2008–present
- Website: tomugly.com

Tommaso Parisi (born 1991), is an Australian musician, singer-songwriter and producer. He formed the band [is], which was later renamed, Tom Ugly. By 2009 he adopted the performance name, Tom Ugly, for himself. He issued a self-titled debut extended play in August 2009, which reached No. 23 on the ARIA Singles Chart.

== Biography ==
Tommaso Parisi, grew up in Sydney. He first earned attention at the age of sixteen, when his band, [is], won the inaugural Triple J Unearthed High competition in 2008. Their first radio-single, "Cult Romance", which he wrote, went on to receive high rotation airplay and became one of Triple J's most-played songs, over the next year. It was later released as an MP3 with over 35,000 downloads.

He was selected as one of Triple J's feature artists for "Next Crop" in October 2008, for the single "Roll Again". The Sydney Morning Herald printed a full page article on their daily issue, posing the question of whether his act might become Australia's "next Silverchair".

The self-titled debut extended play, Tom Ugly, was released via Shock Records on 24 August 2009. Four of its tracks were given high rotation on radio: "Cult Romance", "Roll Again", "Bad with Love", and "All I Wanna Know". It peaked at No. 23 on the ARIA Top 50 Physical Singles Chart. It also No. 3 on the AIR Singles Chart, and received high praise from critics alike By September 2009, the band's line-up comprised Tom Ugly as vocalist and multi-instrumentalist, Mahli-Ann Butt on bass guitar, Peter Gabrielides on guitar, and Adrian Griffin (ex-28 Days) on drums.

With the release of the EP, Tom Ugly toured Australia, playing festivals and supporting headline acts such as Groove Armada at the Hordern Pavilion and Sia at the Enmore Theatre, as well as Simian Mobile Disco, Grinspoon, The Grates, Children Collide, Art vs. Science, and Evermore. In 2012, he performed and recorded an exclusive show at Sydney's Apple Store soon after releasing singles "California" and "I Was Somebody Else", a collaborative single with Australian hip hop artist Pez. In 2014, he released the single and music video, "Slowly", which catalogues his time in Byron Bay recording of a large collection of upcoming, unreleased music. In 2018, he released singles "Villain" and "Elegant Flesh" and performed live at Supanova Expo in Brisbane and Adelaide. In June, 2019, he released the single "They".

== Discography ==
=== Extended plays ===
Extended play with selected details and chart position
Title	Details	Peak chart positions
Title	Details	AUS Physical
Tom Ugly	Released: August 2009; Label: Shock (ZIA09001); Format: CD, digital download	23

== Accolades ==
- Winner of the 2006 Billy Hyde Drum Championships
- 2× Winner at the 2007 JB Hi-Fi Awards, Best Alternative Rock Song – "Someone Sued Superman" and Best Artist – Tom Ugly
- Winner of 2008 triple j inaugural Unearthed High Competition
- 2009 Finalist of the International Songwriting Competition – Bad With Love
- 2009 Finalist at the Vanda & Young Songwriting Awards
- 2009 Qantas SOYA Awards – Finalist (Music)
- 2011 Finalist of the International Songwriting Competition – "I Was Somebody Else" ft. Pez
- 2011 Finalist of the International Songwriting Competition – Don't Clone Me EP (soon to be released)
