= Role Model (disambiguation) =

Role model is a sociological term.

Role Model or Role Models may also refer to:

== Film and television ==
- "Role Model" (House), a 2005 episode of the TV program House
- Role Models, a 2008 comedy film
- Role Models (2017 film), Indian Malayalam-language comedy-drama film

== Literature ==
- Role Models, a 2010 memoir by John Waters

== Music ==
- Role Model (singer), American singer-songwriter and former rapper

=== Albums ===
- Role Model (Cex album), 2000
- Role Model (Bodyjar album), 2013

=== Songs ===
- "Role Model" (song), a 1999 song by Eminem
- "Role Models" (song), a 2018 song by AJR
- "Role Model", a 2014 song by Ronnie Radke
- "Role Model", a song by Brent Faiyaz from the album Wasteland

== Other ==
- Role Models (advertisement), a 2016 political advertisement for Hillary Clinton
