= 28 Days =

28 Days may refer to:

- 28 Days (band), an Australian punk rock band
  - 28 Days (album), the debut album of the band
  - "28 Days", the title song from the album
- 28 Days (film), a 2000 American comedy-drama film
  - 28 Days, the accompanying film score by Richard Gibbs
- "28 Days", a song by Bob Gentry
- "28 Days", a song by Sponge from For All the Drugs in the World (2003)
- "Twenty-Eight Days", a song by LFO from Life Is Good (2001)
- "28 Days: A Novel of Resistance in the Warsaw Ghetto", a book by David Safier (2020)

== See also ==
- 28 Days Later, a 2002 British post-apocalyptic horror film
  - 28 Days Later: The Soundtrack Album, the accompanying soundtrack by John Murphy
  - 28 Days Later (comics), the series that brides the events to the 2007 sequel, 28 Weeks Later
  - 28 Days Later: The Aftermath, the graphic novel that also bridges the events to the sequel
