= Shreen =

Shreen may refer to:

== Music ==
- "Shreen" (song), a 1993 song by All
- Shreen (band), Australian band

== People ==
- Adam Shreen (born 1993), Malaysian footballer
- Shreen Abdul Saroor (born 1969), Sri Lankan activist
