= Take a Look Inside =

Take a Look Inside may refer to:

- Take a Look Inside (Bodyjar album), 1994
- Take a Look Inside (The Folk Implosion album), 1994
