= Not the Same =

Not the Same may refer to:

- "Not the Same" (song), a song by Sheldon Riley and Australia's entrant for the Eurovision Song Contest 2022
- "Not the Same", a song by Dinosaur Jr. from their 1993 album Where You Been
- "Not the Same", a song by Ben Folds from his 2001 album Rockin' the Suburbs
- "Not the Same", a song by Bodyjar from their album How It Works
- "Not the Same", a song by Crystal Lewis from her 1998 album Gold
- "Not the Same", a song by Days Of The New from their 1999 album
- "Not the Same", a song by Rosé from her 2024 album Rosie
