= Adrian Griffin (drummer) =

Australian drummer and bass guitarist

- Origin: Sydney, Australia
- Genres: Rock; indie rock
- Occupation: Musician
- Instruments: Drums; bass guitar; backing vocals
- Years active: 1998–current
- Labels: Festival Mushroom; Rebel Scum/Modern Music/SonyBMG; Rebel Scum/Stomp
- Website: adriangriffin.com.au

Adrian Griffin is an Australian drummer and bass guitarist who played for the punk rock band 28 Days and for Tom Ugly.

== Biography ==
Adrian Griffin formed AGaugeFor, a metal band, in 1998 in Sydney. He originally played bass guitar and provided backing vocals. The other founding members were Tim Manton on drums and Nathan Williams on vocals and guitar. In March 2000, their track "Trawl It", was added to the national youth radio, Triple J's playlist. In the following month, the station's music director, Richard Kingsmill, invited the band to perform a live set for his Australian Music Show. The band supported Incubus, Sprung Monkey (USA), Down By Law (USA), Suicidal Tendencies (USA), 28 Days, Pacifier, Frenzal Rhomb, Bodyjar, Superheist and Sunk Loto.

AGaugeFor released two extended plays, Reproach (1999) and AGaugeFor (December 2001). The former was produced by D. W. Norton and the latter by Paul McKercher. The group's debut album, Ultranationalism, appeared in 2003. Greg Lawrence of WHAMMO website described the album, "You'll hear obvious influences, especially from the exciting era of the early to mid 90s when heavy music finally shed the tag 'metal' and became 'grown up' ... In terms of riffing, there is some real talent in the right hand of Nathan Williams and the timing of Tim Manton (drums) and Adrian Griffin (bass) provide real punch. It is probably the flashes of individuality on Ultranationalism that most impress me ... [it has] tasteful moments of acoustics, an increased tempo more akin to punk and social commentary."

Griffin, now on drums, joined Melbourne-based punk rock band 28 Days in September 2004, replacing Matt Bray. The group had been founded in 1997 by Jay Dunne as lead vocalist, guitarist Simon Hepburn, and bassist Damian Gardiner. Griffin was recorded on their six-track extended play, Bring 'Em Back (March 2006). He remained with the band until they broke up in 2007. Griffin has also played drums for Gvrlls, Truth Corroded, Daemon Pyre, Tom Ugly, Hell City Glamours, Bonic, Killerhertz, Salacious Crumb, Quadbox, and Tubbh. 28 Days reformed in November 2009 to support Bodyjar on that band's farewell tour. 28 Days issued a six-track EP, Lost Songs, in 2013 and had disbanded again by 2015.

Lo! were formed in Sydney in 2006 and by 2011 they comprised Griffin on drums with Adrian Shapiro on bass guitar, Jamie-Leigh Smith on lead vocals and Carl Whitbread on guitar (ex-Omerata). They released their debut album, Look and Behold in 2011 via Pelagic Records. Griffin played drums for their third album, Vestigal (October 2017). It was reviewed by New Noise Magazine's writer, "this ferocious and dense listening experience needs all the (limited) room for air that Lo! gives the listener. Riffs and fantastic kit work from drummer Adrian Griffin help the record fly out of the gate." For seven years Griffin had lived in Asia and returned to Australia prior to recording Vestigal. Whitbread explained, "we had much more time to all be together as a band and really work on the songs properly instead of the last minute rush that usually happens. I think we all felt more connected now having [Griffin] back in the country."

== Discography ==
=== AGaugeFor ===
- Reproach EP (1999)
- AGaugeFor EP (3 December 2001) – Modular Recordings/EMI (MODEP006)
- Ultranationalism album (13 October 2003) – Shock Records (GAUGE003)

=== 28 Days ===
- Bring 'Em Back EP (March 2006)
- Lost Songs EP (2013)

=== Handasyd Williams ===
- Dirt Road Reveries album (2009)

=== Lo! ===
- Look and Behold album (September 2011) – Pelagic Records
- Monstrorum Historia album (2013)
- The Tongueless 7-inch EP (2015)
- Vestigial album (6 October 2017) – Pelagic Records

=== Free or Dead ===
- Strikes 7-inch EP (2016)
