= How It Works (disambiguation) =

How It Works could refer to:

- How It Works Magazine, a magazine by Imagine Publishing
- How It Works, an album by punk-rock group Bodyjar
- How It Works, a UK science book published by Marshall Cavendish
