= Role Model (Bodyjar album) =

Studio album by Bodyjar
- Released: 18 October 2013
- Genre: Punk rock, pop punk, Power Punk
- Length: 37 mins
- Label: UNFD
- Producer: Tom Larkin

Bodyjar chronology
Is It Alive (2007)	Role Model (2013)	New Rituals (2021)

Singles from Role Model
- 1. "Fairytales" Released: 12 September 2013; 2. "Hope Was Leaving" Released: 1 October 2013

Role Model is the seventh studio album from Australian punk rockers Bodyjar. It was released by UNFD on 18 October 2013. The music produced from this album includes a more power punk outcome which is similar to their other album Plastic Skies. It is the final Bodyjar album to feature original bassist Grant Relf, Who would leave the band in 2019.

== Track listing ==
No.	Title	Length
1.	"Petty Problems"	3:26
2.	"Role Model (ft. Ahren Stringer of The Amity Affliction)"	2:35
3.	"My Mistakes"	3:47
4.	"Stranglehold"	3:41
5.	"Fairytales"	2:50
6.	"Vessel"	3:02
7.	"Hope Was Leaving (ft. Joey Cape of Lagwagon)"	3:38
8.	"Break This Feeling"	3:32
9.	"Natural Selection"	2:30
10.	"If This Is It"	3:34
11.	"Together Alone"	2:44
12.	"Light"	2:32
Total length:		37mins

== Charts ==
Chart (2013)	Peak position
Australian Albums (ARIA)	30

== Personnel ==
Bodyjar

- Cameron Baines – vocals, guitar
- Tom Read – guitar
- Grant Relf – bass guitar
- Shane Wakker – drums,
