= Beki and the Bullets =

Australian musical group

- Origin: Melbourne, Victoria, Australia
- Genres: Rock
- Past members: Beki Thomas; Nick Gill; Bobby Manila; Matty Ray; Nick Cunneen; Andrew Durling

Beki and the Bullets were an Australian rock band from Melbourne formed by ex members of The Mavis's and Junkatique, Beki Thomas and Nick Gill. Other members are Matty Ray, Nick Cunneen (both from Mandy Kane) and Bobby Manila. Their music is described as a mix between Gwen Stefani, Cyndi Lauper, Blondie and Mötley Crüe. They have toured Europe and the United States.

== Discography ==
=== EPs ===
- Tuning In - Roadrunner Records (733403) (7 June 2005)
- Wait and See - (1 January 2007)

=== Singles ===
- "Wait and See" - Amp Head (1 March 2007)
- "Open Your Heart" - (1 July 2007)
