= Rapture (The Mavis's album) =

Studio album by The Mavis's
- Released: 10 March 2003
- Recorded: 2000
- Genre: Power pop, pop
- Length: 52:56
- Label: Festival Mushroom
- Producer: Kalju Tonuma

The Mavis's chronology
Throwing Little Stones (2002)	Rapture (2003)	Kids in the Basement: Volume One (2011)

Singles from Rapture
- 1. "Coming Home" Released: July 2000; 2. "Happiness" Released: February 2001

Rapture is the third studio album by Australian pop band, The Mavis's, which was released in March 2003 by their record label, Festival Mushroom Records. It was produced by Kalju Tonuma, who had also worked on their previous two studio albums. The album's lead single, "Coming Home" (July 2000), peaked at No. 72 on the ARIA Singles Chart. The second single, "Happiness", was released in February 2001, which reached the top 100 on the ARIA Singles Chart and No. 9 on the related ARIA Alternative Singles Chart.

The album had been delayed from its originally proposed release date of 2 July 2001 due to problems between the band and the label. According to Matt Atlee of Australian Music Scrapbook website it was an "amicable split", however, Christie Eliezer of Music & Media Business News reported that "Despite what both sides say, the Mavis's split from Festival Mushroom Records and the canning of the July-due Rapture album was far from amicable." In July to August 2001, the group toured Australia and performed tracks from the album, before disbanding in December.

Five months prior to the studio album's appearance, Festival Mushroom Records issued a compilation album, Throwing Little Stones... The Best of (20 October 2002), which included tracks from Rapture. At subsequent reunion concerts by The Mavis's, they have played material from all three of their studio albums.

== Track listing ==
No.	Title	Writer(s)	Length
1.	"Burst into Space"	Matthew James Thomas, Lamar J Lowder	4:56
2.	"Wrong Side of Town"	M Thomas, Simon Sean Nicholas David Austin	4:09
3.	"Coming Home"	M Thomas, Austin	3:51
4.	"Only in My Head"	Rebecca Louise Thomas, Nicholas John Daniel	3:49
5.	"You Come Through"	M Thomas	3:46
6.	"Waking Up on the Run"	M Thomas, Royce Alan M Doherty	4:10
7.	"Happiness"	Matthew Ford, M Thomas	3:12
8.	"Keeping Low"	M Thomas, Doherty, Austin	3:44
9.	"Don't You Ever"	M Thomas, Andrea Jane Vendy	4:20
10.	"Let the Covers Down"	R Thomas, Daniel	4:29
11.	"Saving It Up for You"	M Thomas, Doherty	4:08
12.	"Distraction"	M Thomas, Jane Marie Genevieve Wiedlin, Charlotte Irene Caffey	3:43
13.	"Drive"	M Thomas	4:35

== Personnel ==
The Mavis's members

- Josh Alexander – bass guitar
- Nick Gill – guitar
- Becky Thomas – vocals
- Matt Thomas – vocals, guitar, keyboards
- Andrea Vendy – drums, percussion

Recording credits

- Mastering – Howie Weinberg
- Producer – Kalju Tonuma
- Mixing – Mark Saunders
