= Discordia (band) =

Australian industrial band

Discordia was an Australian industrial band from Melbourne in the mid-1990s. One of a number of bands with that name, it was formed by members of Soulscraper. Discordia were set to be the first Australian band signed to Roadrunner records, but was not due to conflicts. Discordia began life when Sade Lava met James Lynch at Relic Records; the original concept was for Sade to join Soulscraper as vocalist. Over time it was felt a heavier direction was required, so James, Jim and Sade created Discordia.

== Members ==
=== Original ===
- Greg Trull (Dreadnaught) – vocals
- Jim Shnookal (Soulscraper) – keyboards and programming
- James Lynch (Soulscraper, Shreen, Vicious Circle, Children of Sorrow, Good and Evil, The Prostitutes, Rope, Sweet Revenge, The Mumblers)- drums and programming
- Sade Lava (Ran Maclurkin) (Sickman, doll juice, Mince Kitten, Spine of God) – guitar, vocals, programming
- Fee Omens (Mince Kitten, Spine of God) – bass (live)

=== Later members ===
- Chris "Hilly" Hill (Damaged) – guitar
- Phaedra Press (Womnal)(Rope) – bass

== Discography ==
=== EPs ===
- Living Dead (1995) – Siren Entertainment
- Gunwitch (1996) – Siren Entertainment

=== LPs ===
- Living Dead (1996) – Heartland Records

== Other bands ==
Other musical groups named Discordia or a similar name, the type of music primarily associated with them, and their country of origin are below.

- Discordia (Thrash Metal/Crossover) Argentina
- Discordia (Industrial Metal) Australia
- Discordia (Death Metal) Brazil
- Discordia (Death Metal/Grindcore) El Salvador
- Discordia (Atmospheric Black Metal) Germany
- Discordia (Heavy Metal/Hard Rock) Italy
- Discordia (Symphonic Metal) Japan
- Discordia (Heavy Metal) Mexico
- Discordia (Death/Thrash Metal) Poland
- Discordia (Death Metal) Turkey
- Discordia (Technical Death Metal) United States
- Discordia (Symphonic Metal) United States
- Discórdia Profana (Black Metal) Brazil
- Immortal Discordia (Death Metal) Bulgaria
- Omnia Discordia (Death Metal) United States
- Ministério da Discórdia (Heavy/Thrash Metal) Brazil
- Symphony of Discordia (Death/Doom Metal) Brazil
- The Hearth of Discordia (Deathcore) Russia
- Diskordia (a.k.a. Discordia) (Symphonic Doom Metal) United Kingdom
