= The Mavis's =

Australian band

- Origin: Ballarat, Victoria, Australia
- Genres: Rock; pop; new wave; post-punk
- Years active: 1987–2001; 2013–2014; 2018; 2022–present
- Label: Mushroom/Festival
- Spinoffs: Beki and the Bullets, Video Video, The Blow Waves The B-Dolls
- Members: Becky Thomas; Matt Thomas; Rone Kaos; Glenn Lewis; Nick Cunneen
- Past members: Nick Gill; Katherine McNulty; Andrew Craw; Andrea Vendy; Josh Alexander; Keith Urquhart; Gabriel Atkinson; Alister Morley
- Website: Official page on Facebook

The Mavis's are an Australian rock band formed in Ballarat, Victoria, in 1987. Founding mainstays are Becky Thomas (a.k.a. Beki Thomas, Beki Colada) on vocals and keyboards, her brother Matt Thomas on guitar and vocals, and Andrea Vendy on drums. They were joined by Nick Gill (a.k.a. Nik Daniel) on guitar in 1990, and Josh Alexander on bass guitar in 1994. They released three studio albums: Venus Returning (July 1996), Pink Pills (April 1998) – which reached No. 12 on the ARIA Albums Chart – and Rapture (March 2003). Their synth-driven single, "Cry" (January 1998), peaked at No. 13 on the ARIA Singles Charts and was listed on the Triple J Hottest 100 for 1998. The band also performed the song on Hey Hey It's Saturday. They disbanded in December 2001 after a farewell tour of Australia.

== History ==
=== Early years: 1987–1994 ===
The Mavis's were formed as a four-piece post-punk, rock band in Ballarat in 1987 by Katherine McNulty on bass guitar; Becky Thomas (a.k.a. Beki Thomas, Beki Colada) on lead vocals, keyboards, Farfisa, percussion and melodica; her brother, Matt Thomas (a.k.a. Matt Doll), on guitar, vocals, sitar, Indian banjo, Farfisa, Harmonium, percussion, keyboards and sound FX; and Andrea Vendy on drums, percussion, bells and djembe. Andrew Craw soon joined on guitar for live performances. Matt described forming the band as "a way to get away from Ballarat". They were named after a cat, Mavis, that they saw while jamming in a friend's basement. Their first gig was in a church hall with a four-song set list.

In 1990, the band relocated to Melbourne and Craw was replaced on guitar by Nick Gill (a.k.a. Nik Daniel). They released their debut single, a 7" double A-side of "Rollercoaster" and "Witch Hunt", in the following year on the Giggle label.

In early 1993, they released their first extended play, Spindrift, via the Slipped Discs label and Mushroom Distribution Service (MDS). Its five tracks were recorded by Dave Nelson and mixed and produced by Nelson with Paul Barker. Cameron Adams of Beat Magazine described it in February 1993 as "Recorded live at The Empress – and sounding all the better for it – The Mavis's make pop which is edgy and ace fun. From the rollicking 'Spinning Top' to the very cool 'Bless My Soul' it is a fine EP. Best of all is the opener 'Juggernaut', all harmony and melody."

A second EP, Poseidon, was released in May 1994, on MDS. The six-track work was recorded by the line-up of Becky and Matt Thomas, Nick Gill, Keith Urquhart and Andrea Vendy; with Laurence Maddy producing. Jeff Jenkins of In Press Magazine described it, "This is pop that also rocks. It's dreamy, but it also knows when to poke you in the chest. These guys are great." X-Press Magazine's Lucy Morris felt that it "contains six refreshingly exciting, highly addictive, punchy pop songs which should at least earn them the tag of 'a band to look out for'. This is simply one of the best Australian releases for ages. It's the perfect marriage of post punk artiness and classic pop melodies with bucket-loads of energy to boot."

=== Signing and Venus Returning (1995–1997) ===
Their popularity grew and they signed with Mushroom Records' White Records label in 1995, which issued their second single, "Moon Drone Gold", in December. The Mavis's released their debut album, Venus Returning, in May 1996, which was produced by Kalju Tonuma (Nick Barker). Australian musicologist, Ian McFarlane, described how it "highlighted the band's brash sound, which mixed the Thomas siblings' idiosyncratic, imperfect vocal blend, crashing guitars, sugar-frosted melodies, goofy keyboard embellishments and odd instrumentation (sitar, Tibetan bells and Indian banjo)." It provided three singles, "Thunder" (March 1996), "Box" (August) and "Lost" (November). "Thunder" was listed on the national youth radio Triple J audience poll, Hottest 100 of 1996, at No. 92. They toured with Sydney-based pop group, Def FX.

The band's next single, "Naughty Boy", was released in August 1997, which McFarlane felt was "raunchy" and an "aggressive rock" effort. It was listed on the Triple J Hottest 100, 1997 at No. 37 – their highest ever placement. It was used in a Just Jeans ad. In April 1998 they released their second studio album, Pink Pills, which reached No. 12 on the ARIA Albums Chart. It was also produced by Tonuma for White Records. McFarlane declared that the album was "critically acclaimed" and "was a more diverse and ambitious release than the debut."

=== "Cry" and Pink Pills (1998–1999) ===
The second single from the album, "Cry" (January 1998), reached No. 13 on the ARIA Singles Chart. McFarlane opined that it was "infectious... glistening synth-pop... ABBA meets ELO." The track was listed at No. 61 on the Triple J Hottest 100, 1998. They performed the song live on Hey Hey It's Saturday. At the ARIA Music Awards of 1998 the Mavis's received four nominations: Best Pop Release for Pink Pills and Best Cover Art for Dominic O'Brien, Matt Thomas, Rachel Boyce and Alison Smith work, Single of the Year and Song of the Year for "Cry". At the 1999 awards ceremony, their single "Puberty Song" (November 1998) earned Tonuma a nomination for Engineer of the Year – together with his work on 28 Days' album Kid Indestructible and Felicity Hunter's "Hardcore Adore".

After the album's release, the band toured in support of Kylie Minogue, and later that year they backed United States group, Green Day, on their Australian tour. The band contributed a cover version of the Burt Bacharach and Hal David song, "Walk on By", for the various Australian artists' tribute album, To Hal and Bacharach (April 1998), on WEA. This was followed by a cover of the Duran Duran song, "Planet Earth", which was featured on another tribute album, Undone: The Songs of Duran Duran in October 1999. In 2000 they contributed a cover of the ABBA song "Bang-A-Boomerang" to the soundtrack to the comedy film, The Wog Boy.

=== Rapture and disbandment (2000–2002) ===
In February 2000, they released the single, "Happiness". This was followed in May by another cover, this time of Jim Keays' "The Boy from the Stars", which was included in the soundtrack to the film, Sample People (2000).

They recorded material for a third album, Rapture, with Tonuma producing, but it was not released until March 2003 because of problems between the group and their label. The second single from the album, "Coming Home", was released in May. From July to August 2001 the group provided a farewell tour of Australia and performed tracks from the album, before disbanding in December. They issued a compilation album, Throwing Little Stones, in October 2002.

=== Post-Mavis's (2003–2021) ===
After their split, Becky Thomas, Nick Gill and Josh Alexander formed Junkatique, and later, Beki and the Bullets with Beki Thomas and Nick Gill. Matt Thomas performed as Matt Doll and fronted electro-pop bands, The Blow Waves and Video Video, with Byron St John and Matthew Sigley. In February 2013 siblings, Beki and Matt re-united to perform some material by the Mavis's, and to record a six-track EP, Searching for Zero (March 2013). On 27 December 2014 the Mavis's reformed, with original members Beki, Matt and Nik joined by additional musicians, for a one-off show in Melbourne. Alexander and Vendy were unavailable.

In 2018, the band reunited once again to commemorate the 20th anniversary of Pink Pills. The Thomas siblings and Gill performed the album in its entirety for the tour. The final show of the tour took place on 12 May at the Korova Lounge in the band's hometown of Ballarat.

=== Reunion (2022–present) ===
In 2022, the band announced a concert to take place on 29 December in St. Kilda. Becky returned from California, where she had been living in recent years, to take part, alongside a new lineup, consisting of guitarist Gabriel Atkinson (ex-Weta), bassist Rone Kaos (Fight the Sun) and drummer Alister Morley. A second show was added for the following day after selling out due to high demand. The following year, another show was announced for 30 December, featuring just the Thomases and Atkinson, however Kaos and Morley were in attendance.

On 7 August 2024, it was announced that the band would be one of four support acts for TISM's Death to Art Tour. These performances were advertised as being the band's first in six years, despite them having regrouped in 2022 and 2023 for end-of-year concerts. On 18 October, they played a warmup show for the tour at the Odeon in Richmond, with only Kaos remaining from the 2022 lineup. Morley and Atkinson were instead replaced by Nick Cunneen and Glenn Lewis (Have a Nice Day) respectively. At the show, the band debuted a new song, "Heaven", dedicated to Ollie Olsen. On 9 November, the band performed the song at the Sidney Myer Music Bowl with music journalist Jane Gazzo, a friend of the band, on backing vocals.

"Heaven" was released on 24 February 2026. The band launched it at the Castlemaine Royal Hotel on 14 March, although they'd played a free concert at George Lane in St Kilda a week prior. The band's touring activity would later increase; on 21 March they supported American alternative rockers Electric Six at the Northcote Theatre, and 11 July would see them once again supporting TISM at the Adelaide Beer & BBQ Festival, alongside Ratcat and Speed. Two days prior, they had performed at The Tote Hotel in Collingwood, alongside Melbourne hard rock band HZED and alternative rock band Big League. It was also announced they would be the national support to Belinda Carlisle on her Australian tour in March 2027.

== Discography ==
=== Studio albums ===
Title	Details	Peak chart positions
Title	Details	AUS
Venus Returning	Released: May 1996; Label: White, Mushroom (D24542); Format: CD	76
Pink Pills	Released: April 1998; Label: White, Mushroom (MUSH33077.2); Format: CD	12
Rapture	Released: March 2003; Label: Festival Mushroom (MUSH332892); Format: CD	—

=== Compilation albums ===
Title	Details
Throwing Little Stones	Released: 28 October 2002; Label: Mushroom (MUSH33587.2); Format: CD
Kids in the Basement: Volume One	Released: 2011; Format: Digital download
Beaches (Demos)	Released: 8 June 2018; Label: The Mavis's (MAVIS0001); Format: CD, download, streaming

=== Extended plays ===
Title	Details
Spindrift	Released: 1993; Label: MDS (SLIP0001); Format: CD
Poseidon	Released: May 1994; Label: Bliss Inc. (BLISS3); Format: CD

=== Singles ===
Year	Title	Peak	Certification	Album
Year	Title	AUS	Certification	Album
1991	"Rollercoaster"/"Witch Hunt"	—		Non-album single
1992	"Juggernaut – Live"	—		Spindrift
1995	"Moon Drone Gold"	—		Venus Returning
1996	"Thunder"	154		Venus Returning
1996	"Box"	139		Venus Returning
1996	"Lost"	—		Venus Returning
1997	"Naughty Boy"	83		Pink Pills
1998	"Cry"	13	ARIA: Gold	Pink Pills
1998	"Lever"	88		Pink Pills
1998	"Puberty Song"	92		Pink Pills
2000	"Coming Home"	72		Rapture
2001	"Happiness"	96		Rapture
2026	"Heaven"	—		TBA

== Other appearances ==
List of other non-single song appearances
Title	Year	Album
"Stepping"	1989	Screaming At the Mirror II ... A Compilation of Melbourne Bands
"Pinch Her Skin"	1992	Screaming At the Mirror Three: Independent Melbourne Compilation
"Squirm" (live)	1992	Live At the Empress
"Walk On By"	1998	To Hal and Bacharach
"Naughty Boy" and "Cry" (live)	1998	Mushroom 25 Live
"Planet Earth	1999	The Songs of Duran Duran: UnDone
""Boy from the Stars"	2000	Sample People (soundtrack)
"Bang-A-Boomerang"	2000	The Wog Boy (soundtrack)

== Awards and nominations ==
=== ARIA Music Awards ===
The ARIA Music Awards are a set of annual ceremonies presented by Australian Recording Industry Association (ARIA), which recognise excellence, innovation, and achievement across all genres of the music of Australia. They commenced in 1987.

Year	Nominee / work	Award	Result	Ref.
1998	"Cry"	Single of the Year	Nominated	
1998	"Cry"	Song of the Year	Nominated	
1998	Pink Pills	Best Pop Release	Nominated	
1998	Dominic O'Brien, Matt Thomas, Rachel Boyce, Alison Smith for Pink Pills	Best Cover Art	Nominated	
1999	Kalju Tonuma for "The Puberty Song"	Engineer of the Year	Nominated	
