= Extremist Makeover =

Studio album by 28 Days
- Released: October 2004
- Studio: Sing Sing Studios
- Genre: Punk rock, rap rock
- Length: 31:58
- Label: Sputnik Records / Mushroom Records
- Producer: Ulrich Wild

28 Days chronology
Stealing Chairs (2002)	Extremist Makeover (2004)	10 Years of Cheap Fame (2007)

Singles from Extremist Makeover
- 1. "Like I Do" Released: March 2004; 2. "Use It" Released: August 2004; 3. "Birthday" Released: October 2004

Extremist Makeover is the fourth and final studio album by Australian punk rock band 28 Days. It was released in October 2004 and peaked at number 31 on the Australian ARIA Charts.

== Track listing ==
(Tracks 11 to 27 are all silent.) (All tracks written by 28 Days.)

No.	Title	Length
1.	"Use It"	3:16
2.	"Democracy"	3:09
3.	"Just Calling"	3:05
4.	"Girls 101"	3:23
5.	"Birthday"	2:41
6.	"Hate Now"	2:22
7.	"Your River"	4:19
8.	"The Old You"	3:09
9.	"Runaways"	3:09
10.	"Plastic Fucks"	3:16
28.	"Like I Do"	3:18

== Charts ==
Chart (2004)	Peak position
Australian Albums (ARIA)	31

== Release history ==
Country	Date	Format	Label	Catalogue
Australia	October 2004	CD	Sputnik Records / Mushroom Records	338275
