= Soulscraper =

Australian industrial rock band

- Origin: Melbourne, Victoria, Australia
- Genre: Industrial rock
- Years active: 1991–1994
- Past members: Chris Dubrow; James Lynch; Sarah Lord; Elenor Rayner; Jim Shnookal

Soulscraper were an Australian alternative electronic-rock band based in Melbourne. The band formed circa 1991 by ex-members of an alternative / industrial influenced band called The Prostitutes.

Soulscraper were Chris Dubrow on guitar and lead vocals; James Lynch on drums; Sarah Lord on bass guitar; Elenor Rayner on rhythm samples; and Jim Shnookal on lead samples. They combined samplers and audio loops played live with acoustic drums and aggressive punk influenced guitars. The sound was influenced by alternative, industrial, goth, punk, and dance music, combined with an Australian Pub rock live music sensibility.

The band released two EP's, "Heard it all before" (1992) and "Neo-Anarcho" (1993) and both received considerable national airplay on radio station Triple J as well as Australian alternative clubs and community radio stations such as 3RRR. The band played many live shows across Australia, including tours with Pop Will Eat Itself, Ned's Atomic Dustbin, and The Shamen. Soulscraper also played at the first Melbourne Big Day Out festival in 1993.

The band split in 1994 and members went on to form and play in many bands including Discordia (Lynch, Shnookal), iNsuRge (Dubrow), Sobriquet/The Crystalline (Reyner), Snog, and Shreen.

== Members ==
- Chris Dubrow – (guitar, vocals)
- Sarah Lord – (bass)
- James Lynch – (drums)
- Elenor Rayner – (keyboard samplers)
- Jim Shnookal – (keyboard samplers)

== Discography ==
(1992) "Heard it all before" EP.
Produced by Kalju Tonuma,
Tracks: 1. Heard it all before, 2. Manic, 3. Days they rise, 4. American war. With remixes by Ollie Olsen of tracks 1 and 2.
(distributed by 'ID' through PolyGram)

(1993) "Neo-Anarcho" EP.
Produced by Matt Thomas and Soulscraper.
Tracks: 1.Neo Anarcho, 2.Fight, 3.Preacher Man, 4.Motivator, 5. Designer Rebellion.
(distributed through MDS)

(1993) "3RRR Live in your Lounge Room." - Fight (Single)
