= Spinosity =

1992 EP by the Sharp

EP by the Sharp
- Released: 21 September 1992
- Studio: Platinum (Melbourne, Australia)
- Length: 14:31
- Label: EastWest
- Producer: Nick Mainsbridge, the Sharp

The Sharp chronology
| Spinosity (1992) | This Is the Sharp (1993) |

Spinosity is the debut extended play by Australian pop-rock band the Sharp. It was released in September 1992 and peaked at number 28 on the Australian Singles Chart.

== Track listing ==
1. "Talking Sly" – 3:00
2. "Dance for Me" – 2:48
3. "Caught in the Deep" – 2:22
4. "Restless Mind" – 3:05
5. "Butterfly" – 3:16

== Charts ==
| Chart (1992–1993) | Peak position |
|---|---|
| Australia (ARIA) | 28 |

== Release history ==
| Region | Date | Format(s) | Label(s) | Ref. |
|---|---|---|---|---|
| Australia | 21 September 1992 | CD; cassette | EastWest | |
