= Bodyjar (album) =

Studio album by Bodyjar
- Released: 12 September 2005
- Recorded: July 2005
- Studio: Sing Sing Studios, Melbourne
- Genre: Punk rock; pop punk; alternative rock
- Length: 43:45
- Label: Shock

Bodyjar chronology
Jarchives: 10 Years of Bodyjar (2003)	Bodyjar (2005)	Is It Alive (2007)

Bodyjar is the sixth studio album by Australian punk rockers, Bodyjar, which was released on 12 September 2005. It is the first album with their new drummer, Shane Wakker, and was issued via independent label, Shock Records, following their tenure with EMI/Capitol. It peaked at No. 47 on the ARIA Albums Chart.

The band describe the album "as the result of a long and kinda painful process, one of losing your drummer, record label and leaving your management for no other reason than needing to feel like a real band again." Charlotte Dillon of AllMusic observed "[it] further showcased their innate sense of melody amid an otherwise crunchy, guitar-driven sound."

== Track listing ==
1. "Another Minute" – 3:16
2. "Lights Out" – 3:20
3. "Call to Arms" – 2:58
4. "Outside In" – 2:55
5. "Life Story" – 3:29
6. "Same Problem" – 3:47
7. "Blind Dog" – 2:41
8. "She Doesn't Notice" – 3:48
9. "Picture" – 3:20
10. "Starting Over" – 3:09
11. "Descendant" – 3:52
12. "One More Chance" – 2:43
13. "New Direction" – 4:20

== Charts ==
Chart (2005)	Peak position
Australian Albums (ARIA)	47
