= The Blow Waves =

Australian disco rock band

- The Blow Waves (from left to right): Byron St John, Jamie Wave, Matt Doll, and John Pants

Background information
- Origin: Melbourne, Victoria, Australia
- Genres: Electropop, new wave, rock Disco
- Years active: 2006–present
- Members: Matt Doll; Jamie Wave; Byron St John; John Pants
- Past members: Julia Watt

The Blow Waves are a five-piece disco rock band from Melbourne, Australia fronted by Matt Thomas Matt Doll (ex-frontman of The Mavis's) and The B-Dolls.

Matt Doll had been recording bedroom demos for a potential solo album. He'd recently befriended guitarist Jamie Slocombe Love Outside Andromeda and after hearing the songs Jamie offered to play guitar for live shows. After being offered a gig at Rob Roy (Workers Club), another Friend suggested John Pants should play bass. An instant friendship was born and it felt like more of a band rather than a solo project, hence The Blow Waves were born. Matt had been playing with drummer Julia Watt with The B-Dolls and she drummed with the band for a year until other commitments came up. Tania Cavanagh drummed on and off for the band until Jeremi Wallace joined full-time in 2009. Early gigs included Feast Festival in 2006, which they returned to in 2008 and 2009. They played the Forum at the Sydney Mardi Gras in 2008. In 2009, the band toured Europe for the first time to play outdoor stages at the 2009 World Outgames (Copenhagen) and Manchester Pride (UK), with side shows in London and Berlin. They spent over two years recording the album Island but in early 2013 the band decided to take a break before it was released. Island was later released in 2015 as a four track ep. While the band was on an extended break, Matt Doll and Byron St John teamed up with Matthew Sigley The Earthmen, The Lovetones and formed synth pop trio Video Video. They signed to Future 80's Records and released the album Planet Of Storms in 2015. In 2016, The Blow Waves decided it was time to get back together, and in January, released the single Do It (All Night)

== Discography ==
=== Extended plays ===
- The Blow Waves (2009)
- Island (2015)
- Glitter & Twisted (Best of and Rarities) 2020

=== Singles ===
- "Little Bitch" (2008)
- ''Do It (All Night) (2016)
