= Unisong International Song Contest =

The Unisong International Songwriting Contest is the oldest international songwriting competition for and judged by songwriters.

Unisong International Song Contest was founded in 1996 by songwriter Alan Roy Scott (Music Bridges), publisher David Stark (SongLink International) and songwriter/promoter Brett Perkins (Brett Perkins Presents).

The contestants are judged on the quality of their song, originality, and performance.

Winners receive prizes like an invitation to a writing and performing retreat, cash, etc.

Unisong judges have included Lamont Dozier, Diane Warren, Bonnie Greenberg, Tom Sturges, K. C. Porter, Dave Koz, Peter Frampton, Fee Waybill, Alan Rich, Brenda Russell, Randy Bachman, Lester Sill, Don Grierson, Andrew Gold, Barry Mann, Randy Sharp, Harriet Schock, Mike Stoller, John Braheny, Michael Jay, Jorge Corrante, Don Was, John Kalodner, Bruce Lundvall & Desmond Child.
