= Yeah I Want You =

Single by The Sharp

from the album This Is the Sharp
- Released: November 15, 1993
- Recorded: 1993
- Genre: Rock
- Length: 5:04
- Label: EastWest
- Producer(s): Peter Farnan, Rick Will

The Sharp singles chronology
"Scratch My Back" (1993)	"Yeah I Want You" (1993)	"Alone Like Me" (1994)

"Yeah I Want You" is a song by Australian group The Sharp. It was released in November 1993 as the third and final single from their debut studio album, This Is the Sharp. The song peaked at number 44 on the ARIA charts.

== Track listing ==
1. "Yeah I Want You" – 5:04
2. "Love Cats" (The Cure cover) – 3:06
3. "Hanging on the Telephone" (Blondie cover) – 2:25
4. "Add It Up" (Violent Femmes cover) – 4:25
5. "Vicious" (Lou Reed cover) – 3:37

== Charts ==
Chart performance for "Yeah I Want You"
Chart (1993–1994)	Peak position
Australia (ARIA)	44
