= The Sharp =

Australian pop rockabilly band

- Origin: Melbourne, Victoria, Australia
- Genres: Rock, pop, rockabilly
- Years active: 1991–1995, 2000, 2010, 2024–present
- Label: East West/Warner
- Members: Charlie Rooke; Piet Collins; Scott Owen; Louie Lee Feltrin
- Past members: Allan Catlin; Adam May
- Website: https://thesharp.au

The Sharp are an Australian four-piece pop and rockabilly band from Melbourne which formed in 1991 with Allan Catlin on double bass and lead vocals, Piet Collins on drums and Charlie Rooke on guitar and lead vocals. They issued two studio albums, This Is the Sharp (1993) and Sonic Tripod (1994). Their highest-charting single, "Alone Like Me" (1994), reached the ARIA Singles Chart top 20.

== History ==
=== 1991–1992: Formation and Spinosity ===
In 1991 the Sharp was formed as a three-piece rockabilly, pop group in the Melbourne suburb of Collingwood by Allan Catlin on double bass and lead vocals, Piet Collins on drums and Charlie Rooke on guitar and lead vocals. Rooke had formed 59 Sharp, a "good-time bar-band", in 1988; he was later joined by Catlin, and alternating drummers Danny Simcic (also a member of Real Life, a new wave-synth pop band) and Tony Day (Broderick Smith Band). They "played 1950s rock'n'roll and rockabilly covers to a hardcore Melbourne following."

Piet Collins, who was writing Neighbours episodes at the time, joined on drums in 1991 due to other commitments for both Day and Simcic. The group were renamed as the Sharp, which according to Australian musicologist, Ian McFarlane "Boasting double bass, stand-up drums, rockabilly-tinged guitar licks and musicians dressed in all black... [they] presented a united front and an interesting twist on 1990s pop... [their] aesthetic push incorporated frisky pop melodies, tight arrangements, strong harmonies and grungy guitar riffs." For the Sharp, Catlin and Rooke wrote original tracks, both individually and jointly. The group acknowledged the influence of the Kinks, the Beatles and the Easybeats.

In June 1992 they issued their debut CD three-track single "Love Your Head", on Mushroom Distribution Services. It was produced by Nick Mainsbridge (The Triffids, Tall Tales and True, Ratcat). They were signed to East West Music/Warner Music Australasia later that year. Their first hit single, "Talking Sly" (from the Spinosity EP), was written and sung jointly by Rooke and Catlin, which "received plenty of radio support and high critical acclaim." The associated EP reached the ARIA Singles Chart top 30.

=== 1993: This Is the Sharp ===
In May 1993, the band released "Train of Thought", the lead single from their debut studio album. It was co-produced by Mainsbridge with Peter Farnan (of Boom Crash Opera).

The Sharp released their debut album, This Is the Sharp, in September 1993, which was co-produced by Farnan, Mainsbridge and the group. It peaked at No. 13 on the ARIA Albums Chart. They promoted the album with an Australian tour as a support act for United States group, Spin Doctors. At the ARIA Awards of 1993 the Sharp received two nominations for "Talking Sly", ARIA Award for Breakthrough Artist – Single and Best Video (directed by Chris Langman).

Further singles reached the top 50 of the ARIA Singles Chart including "Scratch My Back" and "Yeah I Want You". The latter had four cover versions of work by The Cure ("The Love Cats"), Blondie ("Hangin' on the Telephone"), Lou Reed ("Vicious") and The Violent Femmes ("Add It Up"). Collins explained "We've been playing these songs in our live set on and off for the past two years and we've created our own versions of them."

The Sharp were parodied in the second season of the ABC's sketch comedy series The Late Show in 1993. Jason Stephens, Rob Sitch, and Santo Cilauro portrayed The Sharp in "Skivvies are Back," a parody of the music video for the band's song "Scratch My Back." This sketch can be found in the VHS release The Best Bits of The Late Show Volume 3 and the DVD release The Best Bits of the Late Show: Champagne Edition.

=== 1994–1995: Sonic Tripod ===
A world tour followed in 1994 across the US, the United Kingdom, Sweden and Germany. At the 1994 ARIA Awards they received two further nominations, ARIA Award for Breakthrough Artist – Album for This Is the Sharp and ARIA Award for Engineer of the Year for its tracks, "Scratch My Back", "Yeah I Want You" and "Train of Thought" by Mainsbridge and Kalju Tonuma.

In August 1994, the bands's second album Sonic Tripod, was released. It also reached No. 13 and was co-produced by Farnan, Mainsbridge and the group. Jacqueline Fuller of The Canberra Times felt it was "a foray into the new lyrical themes of social comment and psychological turmoil rather than The Sharp's typical love and party songs." It provided their highest-charting single "Alone Like Me", which peaked at No. 20. The group were known for their image of black high neck skivvies, and energetic live shows, including Catlin balancing on his double bass while playing, and Rooke leaping off the drum kit mid-guitar solo.

Early in 1995 Adam May replaced Collins on drums, however in August the group announced their proposed disbandment due to burn out. Rooke explained to Liz Armitage of The Canberra Times in that month how the Sharp had decided to break up: "It was a round-table discussion. A lot of people like to think there was (a conflict) but there wasn't, otherwise we wouldn't be doing a tour." Rooke reflected on their legacy "I think people will remember us for being a bit different... I'm sticking with the simplicity... I seemed to go for that vibe in the first, and I've always believed in it. I think you can do so much with that approach, but most groups these days are into bigger production." According to Armitage "Both Catlin and Rooke are expected to release something (separately) at the start of next year."

A compilation album, Single File (The Best of the Sharp), was released in September. They performed their last gig on 22 October 1995 at the Hallam Hotel.

=== 1996–present ===
A posthumous collection of previously unreleased studio tracks, Skeletons in the Closet, was released in 1996.

Catlin formed a group, the Rush Effect, and wrote music for ads; Collins took up a career in journalism and writing; Rooke formed a group, Earlobe. Rooke was later a studio session guitarist for Cezary Skubiszewski.

In 2000 the Sharp performed a reunion gig in Melbourne, and in July 2010 they reunited for a series of shows playing in Melbourne and Adelaide.

On 4 March 2024, The Sharp announced via their Facebook page that they would be reuniting without Catlin. Joining Charlie and Piet on double bass is The Living Ends' Scott Owen and vocalist Louie Lee Feltrin. They band's shows have showcased the This Is the Sharp album in its entirety.

On 7 April 2025, The Sharp released a new, independent EP entitled '4'. The four-track EP features the first newly recorded material by the band since the 90s.

== Discography ==
=== Studio albums ===
List of studio albums, with chart positions and certifications
| Title | Details | Peak chart positions |
| Title | Details | AUS |
|---|---|---|
| This Is the Sharp | Released: 6 September 1993 (Note: Vinyl remaster released 31 October 2024 on Warner Music Australia (2173245532)); Label: East West (450993510-2); Format: CD | 13 |
| Sonic Tripod | Released: 22 August 1994; Label: East West (450997336-2); Format: CD | 13 |

=== Compilation albums ===
List of Compilation albums, with chart positions and certifications
| Title | Details | Peak chart positions |
| Title | Details | AUS |
|---|---|---|
| Single File (The Best of the Sharp) | Released: September 1995; Label: East West (0630118042); Format: CD | 133 |
| Skeletons in the Closet | Released: 1996; Label: WoW Management (SHARP0001); Format: CD; Note: Compilation of unreleased tracks | – |

=== Extended play ===
List of extended plays, with selected details and chart positions
| Title | Details | Peak chart positions |
| Title | Details | AUS |
|---|---|---|
| Spinosity | Released: September 1992; Label: East West (450990501-2); Format: CD | 28 |
| Thank You Good Night | Released: August 1995; Label: East West (063011387 -2); Format: CD | 115 |
| 4 | Released: April 2025; Label: Independent; Format: CD, Download | - |

=== Singles ===
List of singles, with selected chart positions
| Title | Year | Peak chart positions | Album |
| Title | Year | AUS | Album |
|---|---|---|---|
| "Love Your Head" | 1992 | 179 | Non-album single |
| "Talking Sly" | 1992 | — (Note: "Talking Sly" was released as a radio single only - and ineligible to chart in 1992.) | Spinosity |
| "Train of Thought" | 1993 | 32 | This Is the Sharp |
| "Scratch My Back" | 1993 | 40 | This Is the Sharp |
| "Yeah I Want You" | 1993 | 44 | This Is the Sharp |
| "Alone Like Me" | 1994 | 20 | Sonic Tripod |
| "Honest and Sober" | 1994 | 99 | Sonic Tripod |
| "Spider" | 1994 | 109 | Sonic Tripod |

== Awards and nominations ==
=== ARIA Music Awards ===
The ARIA Music Awards are a set of annual ceremonies presented by Australian Recording Industry Association (ARIA), which recognise excellence, innovation, and achievement across all genres of Australian music. They commenced in 1987. The Sharp were nominated for four awards.

| Year | Nominee / work | Award | Result |
|---|---|---|---|
| 1993 | "Talking Sly" | Breakthrough Artist – Single | Nominated |
| 1993 | Chris Langman for "Talking Sly" | Best Video | Nominated |
| 1994 | This Is the Sharp | Breakthrough Artist – Album | Nominated |
| 1994 | Nick Mainsbridge & Kalju Tonuma for The Sharp's "Scratch My Back", "Yeah I Want You", "Train Of Thought" | Engineer of the Year | Nominated |
