= Felicity Hunter =

Australian singer and songwriter

- Origin: Australia
- Occupation(s): Singer, songwriter

Felicity Hunter is an Australian singer and songwriter. Her debut single "Hardcore Adore" (released when she was 16) was on high rotation nationally on Triple J. That song and two other releases earned engineer Kalju Tonuma a nomination for the 1999 ARIA Award for Engineer of the Year.

== Discography ==
Singles

- "Hardcore Adore" (1999) - Epic
- "What We Made" (2000)

Album

- Silence the Dark
