= Kid Indestructible =

EP by 28 Days
- Released: May 1999
- Label: Sputnik Records / Mushroom Records
- Producer: Kalju Tonuma, Andy Baldwin, 28 Days

28 Days chronology
28 Days (1998)	Kid Indestructible (1999)	Here We Go (2000)

Kid Indestructible is the debut extended play album by Australian punk/rock band 28 Days. It was the first release on the newly created Sputnik Records; after being signed to Mushroom label in late 1998. Kid Indestructible was released in May 1999 and peaked at number 69 on the ARIA Charts. The tracks "Kool" and "La Tune" received radio promotional release.

At the ARIA Music Awards of 1999, Kalju Tonuma was nominated for ARIA Award for Engineer of the Year for his work on this EP.

== Track listing ==
All tracks are written by 28 Days.

No.	Title	Length
1.	"Never Give Up"	1:34
2.	"La Tune"	1:44
3.	"The Right Place"	2:43
4.	"Kid Indestructible"	3:36
5.	"Kool"	2:26

== Charts ==
Chart performance for Kid Indestructible
Chart (1999)	Peak position
Australia (ARIA)	69

== Release history ==
Country	Date	Format	Label	Catalogue
Australia	May 1999	CD	Sputnik Records / Mushroom Records	SPUT001
