= Cry (The Mavis's song) =

1998 single by the Mavis's

Single by the Mavis's

from the album Pink Pills
- Released: 19 January 1998
- Length: 4:09
- Label: White
- Songwriters: Matt Thomas; The Mavis's; Barry Palmer
- Producers: The Mavis's; Kalju Tonuma; Matt Thomas

The Mavis's singles chronology
"Naughty Boy" (1997)	"Cry" (1998)	"Lever" (1998)

"Cry" is a song by Australian alternative rock group the Mavis's. The song was released in January 1998 as the second single from their second studio album, Pink Pills (1998). The single peaked at number 13 in Australia, becoming the group's highest-charting single.

At the ARIA Music Awards of 1998, "Cry" was nominated for two awards—Single of the Year, losing to "Torn" by Natalie Imbruglia; and Song of the Year, but lost to "No Aphrodisiac" by the Whitlams. The song appeared at number 61 on the Triple J Hottest 100, 1998 countdown.

== Lyrics ==
In an interview with Jane Gazzo, Matt Thomas explained that "Cry" detailed the hardships of his then-relationship with Def FX singer Fiona Horne. "It was a long-distance romance and it was taking its toll. I remember the night we recorded it, when the mix came together. We were putting the vocoder on the vocals and I remember thinking, 'This is something really special'. It was the artistic pinnacle of our career!"

== Track listing ==
Australian CD single (MUSH01710.2)
No.	Title	Length
1.	"Cry"
2.	"Sandman"
3.	"Thunder" (demo)

Australian Remixes maxi-single (MUSH01710.5)
No.	Title	Length
1.	"Cry"
2.	"Cry" (Blast Off Beverly mix)
3.	"Cry" (Shower Hour mix)
4.	"Cry" (Pink Bits mix)

== Charts ==
=== Weekly charts ===
Chart (1998)	Peak position
Australia (ARIA)	13

=== Year-end charts ===
Chart (1998)	Position
Australia (ARIA)	90

== Certifications ==
Region	Certification	Certified units/sales
Australia (ARIA)	Gold	35,000^{^}
^{^} Shipments figures based on certification alone.
