= Lever (song) =

Single by The Mavis's

from the album Pink Pills
- Released: June 1998
- Genre: Indie rock
- Label: Festival Mushroom
- Producer(s): Kalju Tonuma; The Mavis's

The Mavis's singles chronology
| "Cry" (1998) | "Lever" (1998) | "Puberty Song" (1998) |

"Lever" is a song by the Australian alternative rock group The Mavis's. The song was released in June 1998 as the third single from their second studio album, Pink Pills (1998). The single peaked at number 88 on the ARIA Charts

== Track listing ==
CD Maxi (MUSH01760.2)
| No. | Title | Length |
|---|---|---|
| 1. | "Lever" | 3:23 |
| 2. | "Love Bite" | 3:29 |
| 3. | "Better Day" | 7:05 |

== Charts ==
Chart performance for "Lever"
| Chart (1998) | Peak position |
|---|---|
| Australia (ARIA) | 88 |
