= Here We Go (EP) =

EP by 28 Days
- Released: February 2000
- Studio: Sing Sing Studios
- Label: Sputnik Records / Mushroom Records
- Producer: Kalju Tonuma, Andy Baldwin

28 Days chronology
Kid Indestructible (1999)	Here We Go (2000)	Upstyledown (2000)

Here We Go is the second extended play album by Australian punk/rock band 28 Days. It was released in February 2000 and peaked at number 21 on the ARIA Charts. The track "Sucker" received radio promotional release.

== Track listing ==
All tracks are written by 28 Days

No.	Title	Length
1.	"Sucker"	3:36
2.	"Goodbye"	3:31
3.	"Kool" (Be Yourself mix)	5:27
4.	"The Right Place" (The Frank Stoner mix)	5:37
5.	"Never Give Up" (The Randywong mix)	3:56

== Charts ==
Chart (2000)	Peak position
Australia (ARIA)	21

== Release history ==
Country	Date	Format	Label	Catalogue
Australia	February 2000	CD	Sputnik Records / Mushroom Records	MUSH019202
