= Sonic Tripod =

Studio album by The Sharp
- Released: August 22, 1994
- Recorded: 1994
- Studio: Platinum Studios, Melbourne
- Label: East West/Warner
- Producer: Nick Mainsbridge, Peter Farnan, Rick Will, The Sharp

The Sharp chronology
This Is the Sharp (1993)	Sonic Tripod (1994)	Thank You Good Night (1995)

Singles from Sonic Tripod
- 1. "Alone Like Me" Released: June 1994; 2. "Honest and Sober" Released: September 1994; 3. "Spider" Released: December 1994

Sonic Tripod is the second and final studio album by Australian Rock/Pop band The Sharp. It was released in August 1994 and peaked at number 13 on the ARIA charts.

== Track listing ==
1. "Hiding" - 4:12
2. "Totally Yeah" - 3:46
3. "You're Not Alone" - 3:48
4. "Nightclub" - 3:35
5. "Somethings Nobody Can Change" - 4:02
6. "Honest and Sober" - 4:00
7. "Where am I Now" - 3:15
8. "Alone Like Me" - 3:36
9. "Stoplight" - 2:39
10. "Hermione" - 3:54
11. "Feel You Near" - 4:09
12. "Crosswired" - 3:36
13. "Delicious" - 4:53
14. "Spider" - 3:30
15. "I'm Awake" - 3:51
16. "Ego Explosion" - 5:56

== Charts ==
Chart (1994)	Peak position
Australian Albums (ARIA)	13

== Release history ==
Country	Date	Format	Label	Catalogue
Australia	August 1994	CD	East West/Warner	450997336-2
