= Naughty Boy (song) =

Single by the Mavis's

from the album Pink Pills
- Released: August 1997
- Studio: Sing Sing Studios
- Genre: Rock, alternative rock
- Label: Festival Mushroom
- Songwriter(s): Matt Thomas; The Mavis's; Becky Thomas; Nick Gill
- Producer(s): Kalju Tonuma; The Mavis's

The Mavis's singles chronology
"Lost" (1996)	"Naughty Boy" (1997)	"Cry" (1998)

"Naughty Boy" is a song by Australian alternative rock group, the Mavis's. The song was released in August 1997 as the lead single from their second studio album, Pink Pills (1998). The single peaked at number 83 on the ARIA Charts, becoming the group's first charting single.

Australian musicologist Ian McFarlane described the song as "raunchy" and an "aggressive rock" song. The song polled at number 37 in the Triple J Hottest 100, 1997 countdown.

== Track listing ==
CD Maxi (MUSH01671.2 )
No.	Title	Length
1.	"Naughty Boy"
2.	"Naughty Boy" (Nasty Pasty remix)

== Charts ==
Chart performance for "Naughty Boy"
Chart (1997)	Peak position
Australia (ARIA)	83
