= Plastic Skies =

Studio album by Bodyjar
- Released: 10 June 2002
- Studio: Sing Sing Studios, Richmond, Victoria, Australia
- Genre: Pop punk, punk rock
- Length: 34:47
- Label: EMI
- Producer: Kalju Tonuma

Bodyjar chronology
| How It Works (2000) | Plastic Skies (2002) | Jarchives: 10 Years of Bodyjar (2003) |

Singles from Plastic Skies
- 1. "Is It A Lie" Released: 15 May 2002; 2. "One in a Million" Released: 19 August 2002; 3. "Too Drunk to Drive" Released: 20 January 2003

Plastic Skies is the fifth studio album by Australian punk rock band, Bodyjar. It was released on EMI on 10 June 2002, peaking at No. 37 on the ARIA Albums Chart. Three singles appeared from the album, "Is It a Lie" (May 2002), "One in a Million" (August) and "Too Drunk to Drive" (January 2003).

In Australia an extended version of the album was issued with a bonus 3-inch CD of live material from the band's Warped Tour. The Japanese release of Plastic Skies had three bonus tracks including, "TV", unreleased in Australia at the time; it was later a B-side on "Too Drunk to Drive". In August 2005 EMI released Plastic Skies as a double album compilation with How It Works (2000). Each was packaged in jewel cases with full original artwork—both discs were silver and held together in a card slipcase.

== Track listing ==
1. "Is It a Lie" – 2:32
2. "One in a Million" – 2:56
3. "Not from Where I Stand" – 2:56
4. "So Negative" – 2:56
5. "Make a Difference" – 2:48
6. "Too Drunk to Drive" – 3:38
7. "Underwater" – 2:51
8. "Emmaline" – 2:34
9. "Don't Trust Anyone" – 3:10
10. "Feel Better" – 2:51
11. "Tortured Life" – 2:30
12. "Dry Gin" – 2:59
13. "Clones" – 3:04 *
14. "Everyone Else" *
15. "TV" *

* Only on Japanese release

== Charts ==
| Chart (2002) | Peak position |
|---|---|
| Australian Albums (ARIA) | 37 |

== Release history ==
| Name | Region | Label | Date | Catalogue |
|---|---|---|---|---|
| Plastic Skies | Australia | EMI | 10 June 2002 | 5397912 |
| Plastic Skies (with Warped Tour 3" CD and sticker) | Australia | EMI | 10 June 2002 | 5404880 |
| Plastic Skies | Japan | JVC | 29 July 2002 | VICP-61937 |
| How It Works/Plastic Skies | Australia | EMI | 1 August 2005 | 3350132 |
