= Pink Pills =

Studio album by The Mavis's
- Released: April 1998
- Recorded: February, March and May 1997; Sing Sing Studios
- Genre: Alternative rock, indie rock, pop
- Length: 53:17
- Label: Mushroom
- Producer: Kalju Tonuma, The Mavis's

The Mavis's chronology
Venus Returning (1996)	Pink Pills (1998)	Throwing Little Stones (2002)

Singles from Pink Pills
- 1. "Naughty Boy" Released: August 1997; 2. "Cry" Released: January 1998; 3. "Lever" Released: June 1998; 4. "Puberty Song" Released: November 1998

Pink Pills is the second studio album by Australian pop band The Mavis's. It was released in April 1998 by record label Mushroom.

Pink Pills was released in April 1998 by record label Mushroom. It reached number 12 on the Australian albums chart. At the ARIA Music Awards of 1998, Pink Pills received ARIA Award nominations for Best Pop Release and Best Cover Art.

Four singles were released from the album: "Naughty Boy", "Cry", "Lever" and "Puberty Song". At the 1999 ARIA Awards, "Puberty Song" earned Kalju Tonuma a nomination for Engineer of the Year. While "Does It Matter?" was featured in an episode of Stingers during its sixth season in 2002.

== Track listing ==
No.	Title	Length
1.	"Snow White Line"	4:26
2.	"Naughty Boy"	3:13
3.	"Cry"	4:13
4.	"Forcefield"	3:26
5.	"Does It Matter?"	4:02
6.	"Possession"	3:40
7.	"Lever"	3:21
8.	"Sorry"	3:28
9.	"Melt"	3:18
10.	"Fallout"	4:10
11.	"Puberty Song"	3:18
12.	"Long Time at Sea"	12:42

== Weekly charts ==
Chart (1998)	Peak position
Australian Albums (ARIA)	12
