= This Is the Sharp =

Studio album by The Sharp
- Released: 6 September 1993
- Recorded: 1993
- Studio: Platinum Studios
- Length: 46:24
- Label: East West/Warner
- Producer: Nick Mainsbridge; Peter Farnan; The Sharp

The Sharp chronology
Spinosity (1992)	This Is the Sharp (1993)	Sonic Tripod (1994)

Singles from This Is the Sharp
- 1. "Train of Thought" Released: May 1993; 2. "Scratch My Back" Released: August 1993; 3. "Yeah I Want You" Released: November 1993

This Is the Sharp is the debut studio album by Australian pop-rock band The Sharp. It was released in September 1993 and peaked at number 13 on the ARIA Charts.

At the ARIA Music Awards of 1994, the album was nominated for Breakthrough Artist – Album.

== Track listing ==
1. "Scratch My Back"
2. "Talking Sly"
3. "Train of Thought"
4. "Don't Waste My Time"
5. "Kiss Me Again"
6. "Yeah I Want You"
7. "Caught in the Deep"
8. "Closer"
9. "Waiting for the Next Thing to Happen"
10. "Dark Sunglasses"
11. "Love Kiss"
12. "You Don't Know Me"
13. "Can I Love"

== Charts ==
Chart performance for This Is the Sharp
Chart (1993–1994)	Peak position
Australian Albums (ARIA)	13

== Release history ==
Release history and formats for This Is the Sharp
Country	Date	Format	Label	Catalogue
Australia	September 1993	CD	East West/Warner	4509935102
