= Puberty Song =

Single by The Mavis's

from the album Pink Pills
- Released: December 1998
- Genre: Indie rock
- Label: Festival Mushroom
- Producer(s): Kalju Tonuma; The Mavis's

The Mavis's singles chronology
"Lever" (1998)	"Puberty Song" (1998)	"Coming Home" (2000)

"Puberty Song" is a song by Australian alternative rock group, The Mavis's. The song was released in December 1998 as the fourth and final single from their second studio album, Pink Pills (1998). The single peaked at number 92 on the ARIA Charts.

At the ARIA Music Awards of 1999, the song earned Kalju Tonuma a nomination for Engineer of the Year.

== Track listing ==
CD Maxi (MUSH01830.2)
No.	Title	Length
1.	"Puberty Song" (single version)	3:54
2.	"Lever" (First World Club mix)	5:51
3.	"Snow White Line" (DJ Harry mix)	5:39
4.	"Cry" (Pink Bits mix)	4:08

== Charts ==
Chart performance for "Puberty Song"
Chart (1998)	Peak position
Australia (ARIA)	92
