= Shreen (band) =

- Origin: Melbourne, Victoria, Australia
- Years active: 1995–present
- Spinoff of: Nursery Crimes
- Members: Phil Rose; Dave Dixon; James Lynch; Scott MacArthur; James McInnes

Shreen are an Australian supergroup from Melbourne. They formed after the breakup of Nursery Crimes. They released one full-length album, the 11 track Accelerate (Hypnotised). Their single "Beautiful Loser" achieved high rotation on Triple J. On 14 December 1995 the band performed on the RMITV show Under Melbourne Tonight

== Members ==
- Phil Rose (Nursery Crimes)
- Dave Dixon (Nursery Crimes)
- James Lynch (Soulscraper, Discordia)
- Scott MacArthur (Loves Ugly Children, The New Black)
- James McInnes (Nursery Crimes)

== Discography ==
- Accelerate (1995) - Hypnotised
- "Beautiful Loser"
