= Songwriting competition =

Song composition contest

A songwriting competition is a contest whereby musicians submit original music to a third party or forum, generally to win a prize or some other benefit. Songwriting competitions have existed long before the advent of the Internet, but today many are conducted through websites or musician forums. An example is the John Lennon Songwriting Contest in New York, which was founded by Yoko Ono in 1997 and has existed both online and offline. Other important songwriting competitions are the Unisong International Song Contest in Los Angeles or the International Songwriting Competition in Nashville.

Winners receive money prizes exposure and airplay of their songs, sometimes recording contracts. Songwriting competitions, such as the 2FM Song Contest for song-writers aged under 21, are often called "career-boosts".

A variation on the theme of songwriting competitions is ComProsers, whose inaugural contest asks participants to read a short story first and create a piece of music inspired by that story.

Yet another variation is the Write-With-A-Hit-Maker songwriting contest. This annual event sponsored by the 20+ year old Durango Songwriters Expo provides the winning songwriter with the rare opportunity to write a song with a bona fide hit songwriter. Hit songwriters who have participated in this event include Jeff Silbar ("Wind Beneath My Wings"), Kim Williams ("Three Wooden Crosses"), and Pam Sheyne ("Genie in a Bottle"). Some of the WWAHM song contest winners, including Alissa Moreno and Richard Harris, have gone on to have hits themselves and find their way onto the Billboard charts.

Song competitions can also be used to generate discussion and raise awareness of important social and political issues such as the Change the World With Your Song Song Competition in which contestants write about a number of themes based around important social and political issues.

On June 3, 2015, American Songwriter magazine announced a new music / songwriting competition initiated by Fiverr, called The Big Hook.

Songwriting competitions differ from singing competitions, such as Pop Idol and its spinoffs in various countries, because the latter do not require that the music submitted or performed be original; and instead the music there has usually been recorded by other artist previously and is often well known. American Idol however, later launched a subsidiary songwriting competition of its own.
