= Upstyledown =

Studio album by 28 Days
- Released: July 2000
- Genre: Rap rock, punk rock
- Label: Sputnik; Mushroom
- Producer: Kalju Tonuma, Andy Baldwin

28 Days chronology
Here We Go (2000)	Upstyledown (2000)	Stealing Chairs (2002)

Singles from Upstyledown
- 1. "Rip It Up" Released: May 2000; 2. "Goodbye" Released: August 2000; 3. "Song for Jasmine" Released: November 2000

Upstyledown is the second studio album by Australian punk band 28 Days produced by Kalju Tonuma. It was released in July 2000 and debuted at No. 1 on the Australian ARIA Charts and was certified platinum.

At the ARIA Music Awards of 2001, the album was nominated for Breakthrough Artist – Album, losing out to The Avalanches' Since I Left You.

== Track listing ==
All tracks are written by 28 Days

No.	Title	Length
1.	"The Bird"	1:53
2.	"Know the Score"	2:40
3.	"Sucker"	3:32
4.	"Jedi vs the Krust"	0:28
5.	"Goodbye"	3:37
6.	"Time for Us to Leave"	0:12
7.	"Rip It Up"	3:39
8.	"Song for Jasmine"	4:01
9.	"I Remember"	2:27
10.	"Spicy Fingers"	0:10
11.	"Rollin Gang"	1:59
12.	"What You Know"	3:41
13.	"Don't Touch My Turntables"	0:42
14.	"Deadly Like" (featuring Pound System)	3:50
15.	"Information Overload"	3:26
16.	"Kill the Fake (Seshoo)" (featuring Uzumaki)	3:26

All tracks are written by 28 Days

Bonus CD-ROM (Video)
No.	Title	Length
1.	"Kool"	2:29
2.	"La Tune"	1:58
3.	"Live"	1:22
4.	"Police"	0:57
5.	"Rip It Up"	3:37
6.	"Suckers"	3:34

== Charts ==
=== Weekly charts ===
Chart (2000)	Peak position
Australian Albums (ARIA)	1
New Zealand Albums (RMNZ)	33

=== Year-end charts ===
Chart (2000)	Position
Australian Albums (ARIA)	47

== Certifications ==
Region	Certification	Certified units/sales
Australia (ARIA)	Platinum	70,000^{^}
^{^} Shipments figures based on certification alone.

== Release history ==
Country	Date	Format	Label	Catalogue
Australia	July 2000	CD, CD+CD-ROM	Sputnik / Mushroom	MUSH332802 / MUSH332805
Japan	2001	CD	Sony Music Japan International	SCRS 2472

== See also ==
- List of number-one albums of 2000 (Australia)
