= Venus Returning =

Studio album by The Mavis's
- Released: 20 May 1996
- Recorded: Sing Sing Studios
- Genre: Indie rock
- Label: Mushroom
- Producers: Kalju Tonuma, The Mavis's

The Mavis's chronology
Venus Returning (1996)	Pink Pills (1998)

Singles from Venus Returning
- 1. "Moon Drone Gold" Released: 1995; 2. "Thunder" Released: March 1996; 3. "Box" Released: June 1996; 4. "Lost" Released: 1996

Venus Returning is the debut studio album by Australian pop band The Mavis's, released in May 1996 by record label Mushroom. It was produced by Kalju Tonuma (Nick Barker). Australian musicologist Ian McFarlane described how it "highlighted the band's brash sound, which mixed the Thomas siblings' idiosyncratic, imperfect vocal blend, crashing guitars, sugar-frosted melodies, goofy keyboard embellishments and odd instrumentation (sitar, Tibetan bells and Indian banjo)." "Thunder" was listed on the national youth radio Triple J audience poll, Hottest 100 of 1996, at No. 92. The album peaked at No. 76 on the Australian ARIA Albums Chart.

== Track listing ==
1. "Moon Drone Gold" – 3:10
2. "Thunder" – 3:32
3. "Box" – 3:59
4. "Giant" – 3:32
5. "Do You Have a Brother?" – 2:54
6. "Supa*Star" – 3:28
7. "See-Saw" – 3:06
8. "The Land That Time Forgot" – 2:59
9. "Sleep" – 2:51
10. "Lost" – 3:55
11. "Ribcage" – 3:53
12. "Ghosts of the Night" – 3:09

== Charts ==
Chart performance for Venus Returning
Chart (1996)	Peak position
Australian Albums (ARIA)	76
