= Role Models (advertisement) =

2016 US presidential election advertisement

- Client: Hillary Clinton 2016 presidential campaign
- Running time: 60 seconds
- Release date: July 14, 2016
- Produced by: Droga5
- Country: United States

"Role Models" was a political advertisement commissioned during the 2016 United States presidential election by Democratic nominee Hillary Clinton's campaign. The advertisement featured young children watching television sets that played clips of Republican nominee Donald Trump making offensive or off-hand remarks, including that Mexican immigrants were "rapists", and that he could "stand in the middle of Fifth Avenue and shoot somebody" without losing voters.

The advertisement, which first aired on July 14, 2016, ran on national cable channels, online, and on local television in nine battleground states. (Note: Released on July 14 in Virginia, Ohio, Colorado, New Hampshire, Iowa, Florida, Nevada and North Carolina. Released on September 2 in Arizona.)

== Background and content ==
"Role Models" was released by Democratic nominee Hillary Clinton's presidential campaign on July 14, 2016, approximately one week before the opening of the Republican National Convention in Cleveland, Ohio, and one day before Trump announced his vice-presidential running mate, Mike Pence. The 60-second advertisement, produced by advertising agency Droga5, aired on national cable television, online, and on local TV channels in nine battleground states. "Role Models" drew on a strategic vulnerability that Clinton's campaign had identified through polling; a June 2016 Bloomberg News poll asking likely voters which candidate—Clinton or Republican nominee Donald Trump—"would be a good role model for children" showed Clinton up 27 points, 52% to 25%.

Set to somber music, "Role Models" features clips of Trump making controversial and/or offensive statements as children watch on their television sets. The advertisement featured clips of the following statements made by Trump:

- "I love the old days. You know what they used to do to guys like that (Note: Referring to a man protesting Trump at a campaign rally in Nevada.) when they were in a place like this, they'd be carried out on a stretcher, folks."
- "And you can tell them (Note: Referring to businesses that relocated from the United States to Mexico.) to go fuck themselves!"
- "I could stand in the middle of Fifth Avenue and shoot somebody and I wouldn't lose any voters, OK? It's like incredible."
- "When Mexico sends its people. They're bringing drugs. They're bringing crime. They're rapists."
- "You know you could see, there was blood coming out of her (Note: Referring to Fox News reporter Megyn Kelly.) eyes, blood coming out of her wherever."
- "You go to see this guy, (Note: Referring to Serge F. Kovaleski, a disabled reporter, who Trump imitated by flailing and jerking his arms around as he spoke.) I don't know what I said! Agh! I don't remember!"

The advertisement then cuts to text that reads "Our children are watching...What example will we set for them?", before closing with a clip of Clinton's victory speech from the Democratic primary: "Our children and grandchildren will look back at this time — at the choices we are about to make, the goals we will strive for, the principles we will live by — and we need to make sure that they can be proud of us."

== Reception ==
Writing for Slate, journalist Seth Stevenson said that the advertisement was "ingenious" and "extremely effective". Politico called "Role Models" one of the best campaign advertisements of the 2016 election cycle.

NPR later wrote that "Role Models" was an example of Clinton's campaign "purposefully baiting" and "goading" Trump, with Clinton advisor Jennifer Palmieri telling the broadcaster that Trump later dissected the advertisement point by point during a campaign speech, drawing further attention to his own remarks.
