= Stealing Chairs =

Studio album by 28 Days
- Released: September 2002
- Recorded: 2001
- Genre: Rap rock, punk pop
- Length: 40:46
- Label: Universal
- Producer: Machine, Andy Baldwin

28 Days chronology
Upstyledown (2000)	Stealing Chairs (2002)	Extremist Makeover (2004)

Singles from Stealing Chairs
- 1. "Say What?" Released: November 2001; 2. "Take Me Away" Released: August 2002; 3. "What's the Deal?" Released: October 2002

Stealing Chairs is the third studio album by Australian punk band, 28 Days. It was released in September 2002 and peaked at number 6 on the ARIA Charts and was certified gold.

== Track listing ==
(Tracks 13 to 27 are all 4 seconds of silence)

No.	Title	Length
1.	"Say What" (with Apollo 440)	3:18
2.	"Early Mornings"	3:10
3.	"True Story"	3:04
4.	"A General"	3:01
5.	"Tunnel Vision"	3:52
6.	"Take Me Away"	3:39
7.	"What's the Deal?"	3:21
8.	"Just to Make You Happy"	3:02
9.	"Pessimy & the Devil"	2:32
10.	"Photos"	3:28
11.	"Eats Away"	1:56
12.	"Stealing Chairs"	3:21
28.	"January"	4:29

Bonus DVD
No.	Title	Length
1.	"Episode V: Enter The Dickhead - The Movie"
2.	"Scott Murray Tribute"
3.	"Jay's Star Wars Room"
4.	"Belgium Assasins [sic]"
5.	"Hamilton Assasins [sic]"	3:37
6.	"Music Videos ("Deadly Like", "Goodbye", "Kool", "La Tune", "Rip It Up", "Rollin Gang", "Song for Jasmine, "Say What?", "Sucker", "Take Me Away")"

== Charts ==
Chart (2002)	Peak position
Australian Albums (ARIA)	6

== Certifications ==
Region	Certification	Certified units/sales
Australia (ARIA)	Gold	35,000^{^}
^{^} Shipments figures based on certification alone.

== Release history ==
Country	Date	Format	Label	Catalogue
Australia	September 2002	CD, CD+CD_Rom	Sputnik Records / Mushroom Records	335712 / 335715
Japan	2002	CD	Sputnik Records	SICP 275
