= Take a Look Inside (Bodyjar album) =

Studio album by Bodyjar
- Released: 1994
- Recorded: Sing Sing Studios, Melbourne
- Genre: Punk rock
- Label: Shagpile, Shock
- Producer: Bill Stevenson, Stephen Egerton

Bodyjar chronology
Take a Look Inside (1994)	Rimshot (1995)

Take a Look Inside is an album by Melbourne-based punk rock outfit, Bodyjar. The line-up were Cameron Baines on guitar, Ben Petterson on vocals and guitar, Grant Relf on bass guitar and backing vocals, and Charles Zerafa on drums. Recorded in 1994 at Sing Sing Studios in Richmond, it was produced and engineered by two members of United States punk band, Descendents: Bill Stevenson and Stephen Egerton. The lead single, "Time to Grow Up", received moderate radio airplay on Melbourne based RRR FM, and on Australian national youth radio station Triple J.

== Track listing ==
1. "Do Not Do"
2. "Time to Grow Up"
3. "Gee and Al"
4. "So Easy"
5. "Nothing's Clear"
6. "Joker"
7. "2 Many Times"
8. "Double Standard"
9. "Punk Ass"
10. "Hardway"
11. "Parking Space"
12. "Take A Look Inside"
