= 28 Days (album) =

Studio album by 28 Days
- Released: 1998
- Recorded: CD
- Genre: Punk rock, rock, rap
- Length: 26:40
- Label: Stubble Records

28 Days chronology
28 Days (1998)	Kid Indestructible (1999)

Singles from 28 Days
- 1. "Sand" Released: 1998

28 Days is the debut studio album by Australian punk rock group 28 Days and was released in 1998.

== Track listing ==
All tracks are written by 28 Days

No.	Title	Length
1.	"Sand"	2:31
2.	"Kool"	2:30
3.	"Empty One"	2:28
4.	"1988"	2:07
5.	"She's Waiting"	1:56
6.	"Friends"	1:46
7.	"Rise Above"	1:49
8.	"He Could Be"	1:32
9.	"This Song's About You"	2:35
10.	"Ball of Hate"	1:11
11.	"28 Days"	1:44
12.	"Do Our Part / La Tune"	4:31

== Credits ==
- Jay Dunne - vocals
- Scott Pritchard - vocals
- Matt Tanner - vocals
- Simon Hepburn - guitar
- Damian Gardiner - bass
- Adam Nanscawen - drums
- Matt Tanner - samples and turn tables

== Release history ==
Country	Date	Format	Label	Catalogue
Australia	1998	CD	Stubble Records	stub004
