= How It Works =

Studio album by Bodyjar
- Released: 21 August 2000
- Recorded: Sing Sing Studios, Melbourne
- Genre: Pop punk, punk rock
- Length: 37:29
- Label: EMI Australia, Nitro
- Producer: Kalju Tonuma, Andy Baldwin

Bodyjar chronology
Singles And Stuff (1999)	How It Works (2000)	Plastic Skies (2002)

Singles from How It Works
- 1. "Not The Same" Released: 19 June 2000; 2. "Fall to the Ground" Released: 7 August 2000; 3. "Feed It" Released: 5 March 2001; 4. "5 Minutes Away (When Punx Attack Magicians)" Released: 6 August 2001

Professional ratings
Review scores
Source	Rating
Allmusic	4/5 stars

How It Works is the fourth studio album from Australian punk-rock group Bodyjar. The album peaked number 19 on the ARIA Charts. The track "Not the Same" was featured in the 2001 skateboarding video game Tony Hawk's Pro Skater 3 as well as the 2002 motocross video game MX Superfly. The album was released in the US through Nitro Records to coincide with the band's appearance on the 2001 Warped Tour.

== Track listing ==
1. "Not the Same"
2. "Feed It"
3. "Ordinary Lives"
4. "Make It Up"
5. "No Payback"
6. "Calling Orson"
7. "Fall to the Ground"
8. "Good Enough"
9. "Five Minutes Away (When Punx Attack Magicians)"
10. "Another Day"
11. "Clean Slate"
12. "Running out of Time"

== Charts ==
Chart (2000)	Peak position
Australian Albums (ARIA)	19

== Release dates ==
Date	Country	Label
21 August 2000	Australia	EMI
March 2001	Japan	JVC
10 July 2001	USA	Nitro
13 August 2001 (Limited 2CD)	Australia	EMI
1 August 2005 (Limited Double Album Pack)	Australia	EMI

== Notes ==
The Japanese issue comes with two bonus tracks -

1) "Self Inflicted" (previously released on Not the Same EP in Australia)
2) "Halfway Around the World" (previously released on Fall to the Ground EP in Australia)

The disc was re-issued in limited numbers in Australia as a 2-CD set which included the You Got Me A Girls Bike You Idiot! EP. This double CD Issue was first released with picture discs identical to the original releases (of How It Works and You Got Me A Girl's Bike You Idiot!), then subsequently with silver discs. On streaming services album was called How It Works (Deluxe).

EMI also released the 2CD version of How It Works with Plastic Skies as a double album promotion in August 2005. Both albums were in their own jewel cases with full original artwork, and both were silver discs. They were packaged together in a card slipcase.
