= Bodyjar =

Australian pop punk band

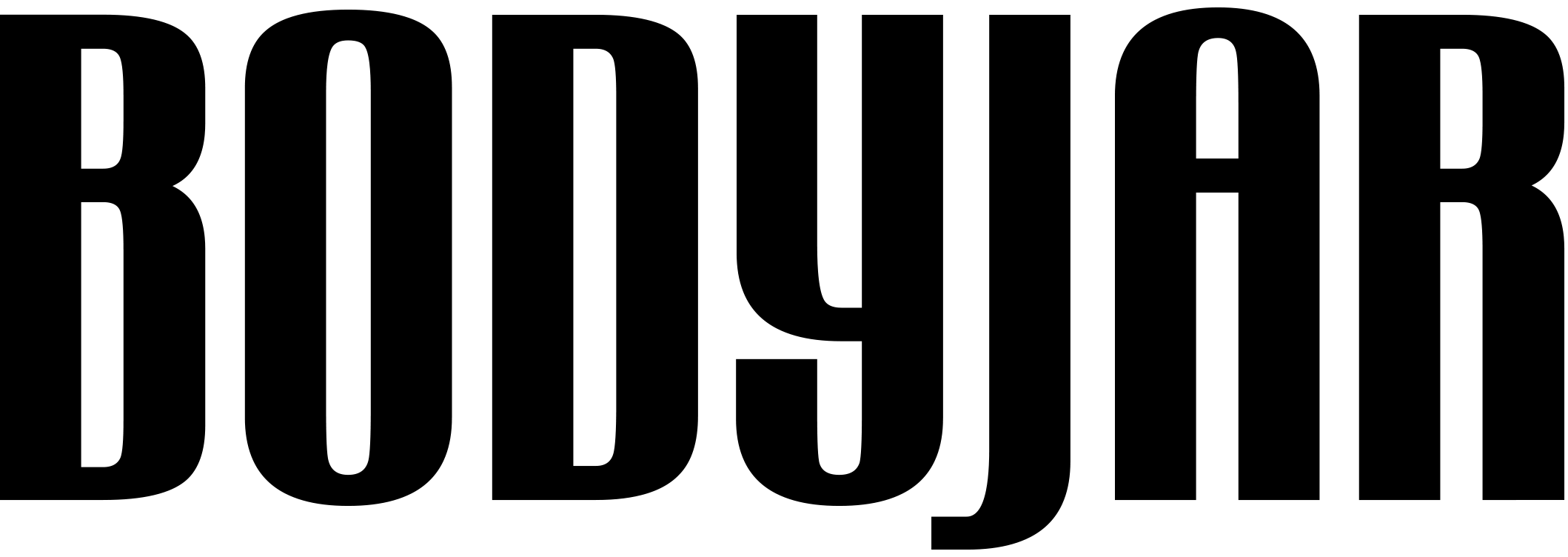

Background information
- Also known as: Damnation, Helium
- Origin: Melbourne, Victoria, Australia
- Genres: Pop punk; punk rock; skate punk
- Years active: 1990–2009; 2012–present
- Labels: Shagpile/Shock; Real Cool / Burning Heart / Revelation; EMI/Capitol; Nitro Records; Shock; UNFD
- Members: Cameron Baines; Nick Manuell; Tom Read; Shane Wakker
- Past members: Ross Hetherington; Ben Petterson; Grant Relf; Benjamin Aitken; Charles Zerafa
- Website: bodyjar.com

Bodyjar are an Australian pop punk band which formed in 1990. They began performing under the name Bodyjar in 1994; their previous names included Damnation (1990–91) and Helium (1992–93). The latter group released an album, You Can't Hold Me Down, in October 1992. As Bodyjar their original line-up were Cameron Baines on vocals and guitar; Ben Petterson on vocals and guitar; Grant Relf on vocals and bass guitar; and Charles Zerafa on drums. In 1995 Ross Hetherington (ex-Bastard Squad, Swamp Rats) replaced Zerafa on drums. In 1999 Tom Read replaced Petterson on guitar and in 2004 Hetherington made way for Shane Wakker on drums.

Bodyjar released six studio albums, Take a Look Inside (1994), Rimshot! (1996), No Touch Red (1998), How It Works (2000), Plastic Skies (2002) and Bodyjar (2005), before disbanding in September 2009. After a hiatus they reformed in March 2012, their next album, Role Model, appeared on 18 October 2013, together with corresponding tour dates.

== History ==
=== 1990–1993: Damnation and Helium ===
In 1990 future members of Bodyjar formed a rock group, Damnation, in Melbourne with Cameron Baines on guitar, Ben Petterson on guitar, Grant Relf on bass guitar and Charles Zerafa on drums. Baines, Petterson and Relf had grown up in the same Melbourne suburb of Vermont and attended the same primary schools. Damnation recorded two demos, Demo and Grow, before changing their name to Helium in 1992, as a pop punk group. That group issued a demo, Bodyjar, in 1992 and followed with an album, You Can't Hold Me Down, on Shagpile Records in October that year. It was co-produced by the band with Phil Rose (of Nursery Crimes) at Argenteuil Studios, Richmond. By 1994 Helium changed their name again, to Bodyjar, as a punk rock band.

=== 1994: Debut studio album, Take a Look Inside ===
Bodyjar line-up of Baines, Petterson, Relf and Zerafa recorded their studio album, Take a Look Inside, at Sing Sing Studios, Melbourne. It was co-produced by Bill Stevenson and Stephen Egerton (both from touring United States band, All) in March 1994. In August 1994 they had their first gig, as Bodyjar, at the Great Britain Hotel, Richmond. A five-track extended play, Time to Grow Up, was issued in that same month. Take a Look Inside was released in September on Shagpile Records and distributed by Shock Records. According to Howlspace website's Ed Nimmervoll "With the help of punk fanzines and all-ages gigs at pubs Bodyjar managed to build a formidable reputation despite grunge". Also in 1994, they supported NOFX at the Prince of Wales in St. Kilda, with Wally Meanie's side project Even, and One Inch Punch (later Mid-Youth Crisis).

=== 1995–1997: Rimshot! and No Touch Red ===
Charles Zerafa was replaced in 1995 by Ross Hetherington on drums – a former member of "hardcore punk outfits", Bastard Squad and Swamp Rats. The group co-headlined a national tour with Pennywise and Blink-182 in December. The band supported No Fun at All and Face to Face on tours of Japan (October 1995), Canada, Europe (March 1996) and then United States (April 1997). On their European and US tours they promoted their next album, Rimshot! (February 1996). It had been recorded in September 1995: the group co-produced with Kaj Dahlstrom (The Bo-Weevils, Nursery Crimes); with a US release on 3 September 1996.

Bodyjar's third album, No Touch Red, was recorded the following year in Montreal over 12 days.

=== 1998–2002 How it Works and Plastic Skies ===
Petterson left the band following the 1999 Big Day Out festival. Facing an impending breakup, the band added Read, formerly of 180 Discord, to the lineup. That year Bodyjar signed with EMI/Capitol, having completed a 33-song demo for their upcoming release. Though independent for the majority of their career, Bodyjar released two studio albums for EMI/Capitol in the early 2000s. The first album for the major label, How It Works, produced by Kalju Tonuma, reached the top 20 on the Australian ARIAnet albums chart in 2000 and achieved gold sales (35,000 copies). The album's first single, "Not the Same", was also featured in a Pepsi ad campaign and the video games Tony Hawk's Pro Skater 3 and MX Superfly.

After their second major label album, Plastic Skies, and the retrospective, Jarchives, featuring new and rare material, failed to build on the success of How It Works, Bodyjar returned to their former label, Shock Records.

=== 2003–2009: Self-titled album and disbandment ===
They released a self-titled album in 2005 after Hetherington left the band in May 2004 while on tour with The Offspring. Hetherington was temporarily replaced for the remainder of the tour by Gordy Forman of Australian punk band Frenzal Rhomb. The role was then filled by Wakker, formerly of the band Channel 3, and he was named the group's permanent drummer later that year.

Despite having their commercial peak seemingly behind them, Bodyjar remained a major attraction on the all-ages circuit in Australia, and continued to tour and play festivals. Selections from their discography have also been repackaged and released for the American and Japanese markets, where they have consolidated live followings.

On 10 January 2008, the band said a new album "looks to be shaping up for late in the year". However, the band announced on 4 September 2009, they would be calling it quits after a farewell tour, which took place between October and December 2009. The band reformed for a one-off gig in April 2011 to celebrate the Royal Artillery Hotel (The Arthouse) venue's last drinks calendar.

=== 2012: Reformation ===
Bodyjar reunited in March 2012 to perform No Touch Red in its entirety at Melbourne's Corner Hotel, together with former tour mates One Dollar Short, Antiskeptic and Game Over. Regarding the show, bassist Relf remarked, "When a good friend of Bodyjar's says they want to start a label and release one of your old albums on vinyl, you don't have to think too long or too hard about the response. No Touch Red kicked some arse back in the day and still holds its head up high all these years later, so I say let there be vinyl and a show to boot."

=== 2013–2016: Role Model ===
As of February 2013, Bodyjar has performed as a support act for various touring bands in Australia, such as The Descendents. Read explained in an October 2013 interview that, following the Descendents tour, the band had "a little bit of money in the bank" and decided to write and record for a new album: "we just thought let's write some songs and if they are good enough we can record them and if they're not then we can spend the money on beer I guess. But they turned out really well."

Satisfied with their new songs, the band announced the release of a new record, Role Model, which is the first collection of new material in eight years. The first single, "Fairytales", premiered on 12 September 2013. Prior to the release of Role Model, Read explained the motivation that underpinned the album:

... we had just finished the No Touch Red tour and I had a conversation with Grant about writing a fast kind of album like that, doing what we are good at and stop fucking around with slower songs and big rock riffs. Just do what comes natural and write for ourselves again. There is a lot of emphasis on having fun this time around, I think that has come through on the record. "Stop enjoying yourself and have some fun".

Read also explained that Tom Larkin of New Zealand band Shihad produced the album at his own studios in Brunswick, Melbourne, Australia, and that the band referenced the sound production of the bands Refused, Foo Fighters and Starmarket for the recording process. Joey Cape, of Lagwagon, and Ahren Stringer, of The Amity Affliction, contributed vocals to the album, while a guitar solo was recorded by Stephen Egerton of Descendents.

Bodyjar enlisted Australian independent music label UNFD to release Role Model on 18 October 2013, and bundle packages that included a skateboard deck, a T-shirt and a stubby holder were released. Baines hired Dutch design company ATTAK to create the artwork for the album.

=== 2017–2022: Terra Firma and New Rituals ===
On 13 October 2017 the band released a new EP, Terra Firma on three vinyl colour-ways limited to 100 copies each.

Bodyjar were one of the first bands to return to live shows following Melbourne's COVID lockdown period. The band returned in January 2021 with a show at 170 Russell.

On 1 December 2021, Bodyjar announced their eighth studio album New Rituals, released on 4 February 2022; 9 years after their previous studio album Role Model. Recording of New Rituals took place throughout 2020 and 2021, a process which was heavily delayed by Melbourne's numerous COVID lockdowns.

=== 2025-present Rare and Ninth Album ===
On 17 September 2025 a new single "Here Lies Caroline" was released.

On 29 March 2026 Bodyjar announced they're working on their ninth studio album.. The band released a new EP Rare on 2 May containing their hard to find songs

On 24 June 2026, the single "Sound of the Stereo" was released..

== Side projects ==
At the beginning of 2007, Baines and Wakker launched a side project called Cola Wars, a moniker that Baines has used for various projects since 1999—Mark Brunott (Automan, The Volume10, and Steelbirds) and Mikey Juler (ex-For Amusement Only) completed the lineup. The band have played under other pseudonyms, such as "Daughters of the Rich" and "William Shatner's Dacks".

Read's and Relf's side project is called Burn The City, which also involves a former member of Australian band One Dollar Short on drums.

== Personal lives ==
Shane Wakker is from the Victorian town of Moe. Cameron Baines's wedding to wife Regan occurred in late April 2012.

Since 2016, Baines has operated Locality Store in Greensborough, which sells skateboards and equipment, music, and apparel.

== Members ==
=== Current members ===
- Cameron Baines – lead vocals, guitar (1990–2009, 2012–present)
- Tom Read – guitar, backing and occasional lead vocals (1999–2009, 2012–present)
- Shane Wakker – drums, backing vocals (2004–2009, 2012–present)
- Nick Manuell – bass, backing vocals (2019–present)

=== Past members ===
- Ben Pettersson – lead vocals, guitar (1990–1999)
- Grant Relf – bass, backing vocals (1990–2009, 2012–2019)
- Charles Zerafa – drums (1990–1995)
- Ross Hetherington – drums (1995–2004)

== Discography ==
=== Studio albums ===
List of studio album, with selected details and chart positions
Title	Album details	Peak chart positions
Title	Album details	AUS
You Can't Hold Me Down (released by Helium)	Released: 1993; Label: Shagpile (SHAGCD 2016); Format: CD	—
Take a Look Inside	Released: September 1994; Label: Shagpile (SHAGCD 2020); Format: CD	—
Rimshot!	Released: February 1996; Label: Shagpile (SHAGCD 2028); Format: CD	—
No Touch Red	Released: 1998; Label: Shagpile (SHAGCD 2040); Format: CD	—
How It Works	Released: August 2000; Label: EMI (5289142); Format: CD	19
Plastic Skies	Released: June 2002; Label: EMI (5397912); Format: CD	37
Bodyjar	Released: September 2005; Label: Shock (JAR05); Format: CD	47
Role Model	Released: October 2013; Label: We Are Unified (UNFD035); Format: CD, download	30
New Rituals	Released: 2 February 2022; Label: Pile of Sand; Format: CD, LP, download	35

=== Live albums ===
List of Live album, with selected details
Title	Album details
Is It Alive	Released: February 2007; Label: Shock (JAR07); Format: CD, Digital download
The End Is Now	Released: 2009; Label: The Hi-Fi Live (THEHIFI005); Format: CD, Digital download; Note: limited edition

=== Compilation albums ===
List of Compilation album, with selected details
Title	Album details
Singles and Stuff	Released: September 1999; Label: Shagpile/ Shock Records (SHAGCD 2044); Format: CD
Jarchives: 10 Years of Bodyjar	Released: 2003; Label: EMI/ Capitol (5958712); Format: CD
Time To Grow Up	Released: 2004 (Brazil only); Label: Tronador Music (TMSS14); Format: CD

=== Extended plays ===
List of Extended plays, with selected details
Title	EP details
Time to Grow Up	Released: 1994; Label: Shagpile (SHAGCD 7010); Format: CD
Gee And Al / Do Not Do	Released: 1995; Label: Shagpile (SHAGCD 7014); Format: CD
Strange Harvest	Released: August 1997; Label: Shagpile (SHAGCD7028); Format: CD
You Got Me a Girls Bike You Idiot!	Released: 2001; Label: EMI Music (CDRP634); Format: Limited Edition CD
Terra Firma	Released: October 2017; Label: We Are Unified (UNFD101); Format: Cd, digital download
Rare	Released: 2 May 2026; Label: Self-released; Format: Digital download

=== Singles ===
Year	Title	Peak chart positions	Album
Year	Title	AUS	Album
1994	"Time To Grow Up"	–	Time To Grow Up
1996	"Glossy Books"	–	Rimshot
1998	"Remote Controller"	–	No Touch Red
1998	"Return to Zero"	–	No Touch Red
1999	"A Hazy Shade of Winter"	–	Singles and Stuff
2000	"Not the Same"	69	How It Works
2000	"Fall to the Ground"	56	How It Works
2001	"Feed It"	60	How It Works
2001	"Five Minutes Away"	–	How It Works
2002	"Is It a Lie"	56	Plastic Skies
2002	"One in a Million"	65	Plastic Skies
2002	"Feel Better"	–	Plastic Skies
2003	"Too Drunk to Drive"	–	Plastic Skies
2003	"17 Years"	–	Jarchives (10 Years of Bodyjar)
2005	"Lights Out "	78	Bodyjar
2013	"Fairytales"	–	Role Model
2013	"Hope Was Leaving"	–	Role Model
2017	"Terra Firma"	–	Terra Firma
2020	"Big Shot"	–	New Rituals
2021	"Get Out Of My Head"	–	New Rituals
2021	"Rain"	–	New Rituals
2025	"Here lies Caroline"	–	–
2026	"Sound of the Stereo"	–	–
