= 28 Days (band) =

Australian rock band

- Origin: Frankston, Victoria
- Genres: Rap rock; pop punk
- Years active: 1996–2007, 2009–present
- Labels: Stubble; Sputnik; Festival Mushroom; Rebel Scum; Modern; SonyBMG; Stomp; P.I.A.S; Mushroom UK; Dogma
- Members: Jay Dunne; Damian Gardiner; Simon Hepburn; Lonny Finn
- Past members: Adam Nanscawen p.k.a. Adam Bomber; Jason Howard; Dan Kerby; Scott Murray; Simon Poulton; Vince Jukic; Matt Bray; Matt Tanner; Adrian Griffin
- Website: www.28-days.com.au

28 Days are an Australian rock band, which formed in 1997, by mainstay members Jay Dunne as lead vocalist, guitarist Simon Hepburn, and bassist Damian Gardiner. Their second studio album Upstyledown (July 2000), peaked at number one on the ARIA Albums Chart. Their singles, "Rip It Up" (May 2000), "Say What?" (November 2001) and "What's the Deal?" (October 2002), all reached the associated ARIA Singles Chart top 40. After declining popularity following their 2004 album, Extremist Makeover, the band released a greatest hits album 10 Years of Cheap Fame (March 2007) before separating later that year. They reformed in 2009 to support long time friends Bodyjar on their End is Now Tour. 28 Days have released no new material since "Unmarked Graves" (April 2015). Their drummer, Scott Murray, died after being struck by a car in November 2001, aged 22.

== History ==
=== 1997–1999: Formation to Kid Indestructible ===
28 Days were formed in Frankston, Victoria in October 1996 by James "Jay" Dunne on lead vocals, Simon Hepburn on lead guitar (the pair had worked together both on graffiti and in several punk and hardcore bands including Mindsnare, S.I.C., and Self Reliance), Damian Gardiner on bass guitar and Adam Nanscawen (p.k.a. Adam Bomber) on drums.

Their self-titled debut album, was released independently in March 1998 via Stubble Records. Music journalist, Ed Nimmervoll, observed it gained, "a wave of encouraging reviews from journalists worldwide, including a 4K rating from Kerrang! in the U.K." Within a year they were signed by Festival Mushroom Records for a new imprint, Sputnik. During 1998 the band added Jay Howard on turntables and then replaced Bomber on drums by Scott Murray. In May 1999 the group released Kid Indestructible, a five-track extended play, which was engineered by Kalju Tonuma. The EP peaked number 69 on the ARIA Charts. National youth radio Triple J played its tracks, "Kool" and "La Tune", on high rotation. At the ARIA Music Awards of 1999, Tonuma was nominated for Engineer of the Year for his work.

=== 2000–2002:Upstyledown and Stealing Chairs ===
28 Days released another five-track EP, Here We Go (February 2000), which included the single, "Sucker". The EP debuted at number 21 on the ARIA Charts. "Rip It Up" was released in May and peaked at number 12. In July they released their second studio album, Upstyledown, which debuted at number one on the ARIA Charts and was certified platinum by ARIA for shipment of 70000 copies. It also reached the top 40 on the New Zealand Albums Chart. Two further singles were released from the album, "Goodbye" and "Song for Jasmine".

The group issued a DVD, When Dickheads Snap (2001), featuring tour shots, and behind-the-scenes footage from concerts in Europe, Japan and Australia. In November 2001 the band released, "Say What?", a collaboration with British electronic group, Apollo 440, which reached number 23 on the ARIA Charts. On 18 November 2001 Scott Douglas Murray died, aged 22, after being struck by a car while walking home after band practice.

Vince Jukic joined in August 2002 as Murray's replacement on drums. The band released "Take Me Away", in that month, as the lead single from their third studio album, Stealing Chairs (September 2002). The album peaked at number six and was certified gold. "What's the Deal?" was released in October and appeared at number 32.

=== 2003–2007: Extremist Makeover and hiatus ===
In February 2003, the band received negative publicity when they and their fans were accused of causing damage worth $4,500 at a concert by rival Sydney-based alt-rock band, the Drugs. The damage was allegedly in response to an open letter that the Drugs' lead singer, Ian Baddley (Matt Downey), had posted on his band's website. Baddley wrote that, at 28 Days' 2003 Big Day Out performance in Sydney, Dunne had provided "improper, unhealthy and bigoted messages of hate and vilification [which] are far worse then [sic] anything I've ever heard from a member of Rammstein." A report in The Age concluded that Baddley was "accusing [Dunne] of being homophobic and using hateful labels." Dunne did not reply to Baddley, and denies being homophobic; he described the situation as "a bit gay". 28 Days were not charged by police despite the Drugs' accusations.

28 Days issued a single, "Like I Do" (March 2004), followed by "Use It" (August) and "Birthday" (October), but none reached the top 50. Their fourth studio album, Extremist Makeover (October 2004), peaked at number 31 and the group left Festival Mushroom in the following month. A month before the album appeared, Matt Bray was replaced by Adrian Griffin on drums. In March 2006, the band self-released a six-track EP, Bring 'Em Back, and another DVD, When Dickheads Snap 3 which was only available at 28 Days shows. The band announced their 10 Years of Cheap Fame Tour and a compilation album of the same name appeared in March 2007. The band retired late in 2007.

=== 2009–2018: Reformation and Lost Songs ===
28 Days reformed in 2009 with the line-up of Dunne, Gardner, Hepburn and Griffin. In May they released a new demo on their MySpace page. They supported Bodyjar's farewell tour in November of that year and played the Fistful of Awesome showcase at Melbourne's Hi Fi Bar, with up and coming rock acts. In April 2010, 28 Days released a single, "Sing It to Me". In 2013 they issued, "Amber Afternoons", and another six-track EP, Lost Songs, which is a collection of rare tracks. Their final single, "Unmarked Graves", appeared in April 2015. Subsequently, no new material and their official website has not been updated since mid-2013. They continue to play live regularly despite no new music being in the works.

== Discography ==
=== Studio albums ===
List of studio albums, with selected details and chart positions
Title	Album details	Peak chart positions		Certification
Title	Album details	AUS	NZ	Certification
28 Days	Released: 1998; Label: Stubble (stub004); Format: CD	—	—	
Upstyledown	Released: July 2000; Label: Sputnik / Mushroom (MUSH332805); Format: CD, CD+CD-ROM	1	33	ARIA: Platinum
Stealing Chairs	Released: September 2002; Label: Sputnik / Mushroom (335712); Format: CD, CD+DVD	6	—	ARIA: Gold
Extremist Makeover	Released: October 2004; Label: Sputnik / Mushroom (338275); Format: CD	31	—	

=== Compilation albums ===
List of compilation albums, with selected details
Title	Album details
10 Years of Cheap Fame	Released: March 2007; Label: Rebelscum Records (28D0010); Format: CD, Digital download

=== Extended plays ===
List of extended plays, with selected details and chart positions
Title	EP details	Peak chart positions
Title	EP details	AUS
Kid Indestructible	Released: May 1999; Label: Sputnik (SPUT001); Format: CD	69
Here We Go	Released: February 2000; Label: Sputnik, Mushroom (MUSH019202); Format: CD	21
Bring 'Em Back	Released: March 2006; Label: Rebelscum (MMRSR001); Format: CD, digital download	—
Lost Songs	Released: 2013; Label: Self-released; Format: Digital download	—

=== Singles ===
List of singles, with selected chart positions
Title	Year	Peak chart positions	Certification	Album
Title	Year	AUS	Certification	Album
"Ball of Hate"	1997	(Note: "Ball of Hate" was released as a 7" single only)		28 Days
"Sand"	1998	—		28 Days
"Kool"	1999	(Note: "Kool" was released as a radio-only single, which was ineligible to chart in 1999)		Kid Indestructible
"La Lune"	1999	(Note: "La Lune" was released as a radio-only single, which was ineligible to chart in 1999)		Kid Indestructible
"Sucker"	2000	(Note: Sales of "Sucker" counted toward the EP Here We Go)		Here We Go
"Rip It Up"	2000	12	ARIA: Gold	Upstyledown
"Goodbye"	2000	50		Upstyledown
"Song for Jasmine"	2000	57		Upstyledown
"Say What?" (with Apollo Four Forty)	2001	23		Stealing Chairs
"Take Me Away"	2002	42		Stealing Chairs
"What's the Deal?"	2002	32		Stealing Chairs
"Like I Do"	2004	69		Extremist Makeover
"Use It"	2004	75		Extremist Makeover
"Birthday"	2004	66		Extremist Makeover
"Boom"	2006	—		Bring 'Em Back
"Sing It to Me"	2010	—		Lost Songs
"Amber Afternoons"	2013	—		Lost Songs
"Unmarked Graves"	2015	—		Non-album single

== Awards and nomination ==
=== ARIA Music Awards ===
The ARIA Music Awards are annual awards, which recognises excellence, innovation, and achievement across all genres of Australian music. 28 Days were nominated for five awards.

Year	Nominee / work	Award	Result
1999	Kalju Tonuma for Kid Indestructible	Engineer of the Year	Nominated
2000	"Rip It Up"	Breakthrough Artist – Single	Nominated
2000	"Rip It Up"	Best Alternative Release	Nominated
2000	"Rip It Up"	Single of the Year	Nominated
2001	Upstyledown	Breakthrough Artist – Album	Nominated
