= Kalju Tonuma =

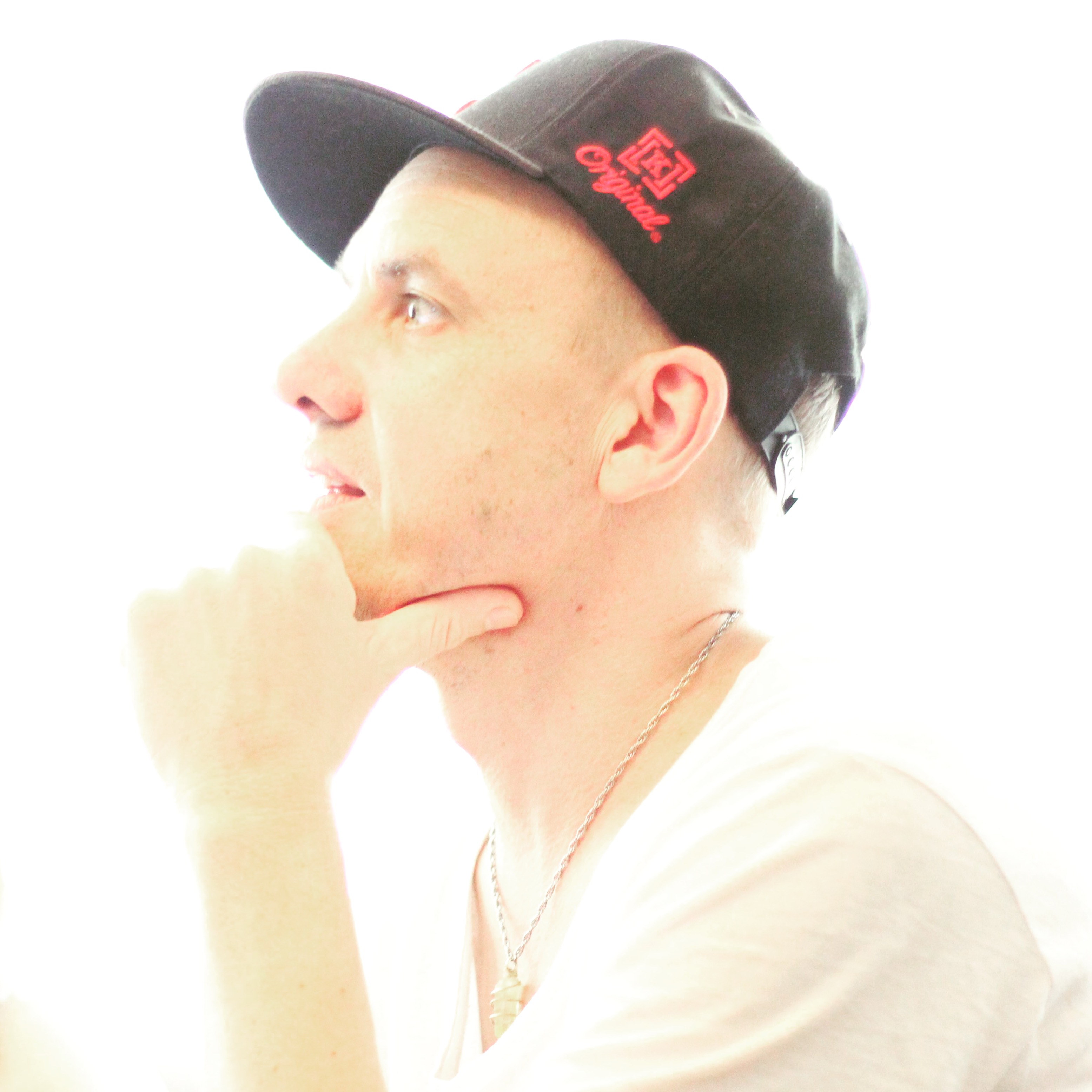

Background information
- Origin: Australia
- Genres: Rock, Pop, Alternative, Psychedelic Folk, Electro-Pop, Electronic, Alt-Country, Metal
- Occupations: Record Producer, Audio Artist, Drummer, Performer, Songwriter
- Years active: 1985–present
- Label: Of One Kind
- Website: kaljutonuma.com

Kalju Tonuma is an Australian music producer, songwriter, drummer and performer of Estonian descent. He is one half of the production team MEJU (pronounced "me-you") which he founded with Megan Bernard in 2014. He also manages record label Of One Kind and live-stream venue The B Side. Tonuma also performs as the drummer for Anactoria, Megan Bernard and The Indulgence and Peter Farnan and The Home Bodies.

He began his career in 1989 at Platinum Studios in South Yarra, Australia. He has been nominated for a number of Australian Recording Industry Association (ARIA) Music Awards. These include 'Engineer of the Year' (1994) for This Is the Sharp by The Sharp, ‘Engineer of the Year’ (1999) for Kid Indestructible by 28 Days; Felicity Hunter's "Hardcore Adore"; and The Mavis's "Puberty Song", as well as ‘Engineer of the Year’ and ‘Producer of the Year’ (2001) for Superheist’s The Prize Recruit. In 2007, he completed a Master of Music Degree (M.Mus.) at Queensland University of Technology (QUT).

== Gold and Platinum records ==
- 1995 - The Sharp - GOLD (album) - This Is The Sharp
- 1997 - The Mavis's - GOLD (single & album) - Cry/Pink Pills
- 2000 - 28 Days - DOUBLE PLATINUM (album) - Upstyledown GOLD (single) - Rip It Up
- 2005 - Bodyjar - GOLD (album) - How It Works
- 2009 - The Temper Trap - PLATINUM (album) SILVER (UK album) - Conditions
- 2009 - The Living End - DOUBLE PLATINUM (album) - White Noise
- 2010 - Superheist - GOLD (album) - The Prize Recruit

== Awards and nominations ==
- 1994 - Nominated for Engineer Of The Year (ARIA Music Awards)
- 1999 - Nominated for Engineer Of The Year (ARIA Music Awards)
- 2001 - Nominated for Engineer Of The Year (ARIA Music Awards)
- 2001 - Nominated for Producer Of The Year (ARIA Music Awards)

== Discography ==
As producer, mixer and/or engineer

Year	Artist	Song/Album	Producer	Engineer	Mix	Note
2016	Taipan Tiger Girls	Live At The Melbourne Town Hall			Yes	
2016	Taipan Tiger Girls	2			Yes	
2016	Video Video	Planet Of Storms			Yes	
2015	Suiciety	Crawling Machine Edition		Yes		
2013	Polygon Palace	Sunburnt Shadows			Yes	
2013	Polygon Palace	Starpilots			Yes	
2013	Dom Italiano & The Upbeat Mafia	Way Out			Yes	
2009	Various & Baterz – Great Big Squiddy Fun: A Baterz Tribute/Baterz For Beginners	Morning After			Yes	
2009	The Temper Trap	Down River (from Conditions)		Yes		
2009	All Left Out	The Conquest		Yes		
2005	The D4	Out Of My Head			Yes	
2005	Jimmy Barnes with Mahalia Barnes	Gonna Take Some Time Double Happiness			Yes	
2005	K-Oscillate	K-Oscillate		Yes		
2004	Rob Mills	Up All Night - "That's All You Are"			Yes	
2004	Infusion	Six Feet Above Yesterday		Yes	Yes	(tracks: 2, 8, 9, 12)
2004	Lydia Denker	One Perfect Day			Yes	
2003	Evermore	My Own Way			Yes	
2003	Evermore	Oil & Water			Yes	
2003	Evermore	Slipping Away			Yes	
2002	28 Days	Stealing Chairs			Yes	
2002	The Butterfly Effect	Crave			Yes	
2001	Area 7	Say It To My Face	Yes	Yes		
2001	28 Days	Sucker		Yes		
2001	Superheist	The Prize Recruit	Yes	Yes		
2001	28 Days and Apollo 440	This Is Not a Set-Up and Airplanes from Say What?	Yes	Yes	Yes	
2000	Superheist	Have Your Way 8 Miles High	Yes		Yes	
2000	Mudhead	Mudhead		Yes		
2000	28 Days	Here We Go		Yes		
2000	The Screaming Jets	Shine Over Me		Yes		
2000	The Screaming Jets	Higher With You		Yes		
2000	The Screaming Jets	Scam		Yes		
2000	Superheist	Crank The System		Yes		
2000	28 Days	Rip It Up		Yes		
2000	28 Days	Upstyledown		Yes		
2000	Bodyjar	How It Works			Yes	
2000	Insurge	Globalization			Yes	
1999	Insurge	"Feast or Famine"			Yes	
1999	Lisa Miller	As Far As Life Goes		Yes		
1999	Rebecca's Empire	Welcome			Yes	
2000	Deadstar	Somewhere Over The Radio		Yes		
1999	Felicity Hunter	Hardcore Adore			Yes	
1999	28 Days	Kid Indestructible		Yes		
1998	Mark Seymour	Home Again		Yes		
1998	Beliicose	Illusion			Yes	
1998	Christopher Marshall	Strange Waters, Small Mercies		Yes		
1998	Cold Chisel	The Last Wave Of Summer		Yes		
1998	Hunters & Collectors	Suit Your Style		Yes		
1998	Hunters & Collectors	Juggernaut		Yes		
1998	The Mavis's	Pink Pills		Yes		
1997	Boom Crash Opera	Fizz from Dreaming Up A Fire			Yes	
1997	Mark Seymour	Last Ditch Cabaret		Yes		
1997	Mark Seymour	King Without A Clue		Yes		
1996	Frenzal Rhomb	Disappointment			Yes	
1996	Frenzal Rhomb	Not So touch Now			Yes	
1996	Frenzal Rhomb	Punch In The Face			Yes	
1996	Insurge	Soul 4 Sale			Yes	
1996	Insurge	Speculator			Yes	
1996	Insurge	ak 47			Yes	
1996	The Body Electric	I Don't Want It			Yes	
1996	Jane McCracken	Giraffes Never Forget			Yes	
1996	Peter Lillie	Poetry and Western		Yes		
1996	Deadstar	Don't It Get You Down		Yes		
1996	Deadstar	Milk		Yes		
1996	Nude	Bent As A Dali		Yes		
1996	Deadstar	Sex Sell		Yes		
1996	Deadstar	She Loves She		Yes		
1995	Insurge	Political Prisoners		Yes		
1995	Richard Pleasance	Mythology			Yes	
1995	Skunkhour	Feed Strange Equation			Yes	
1995	Skunkhour	Did You Write It All Down? Up To Our Necks In It		Yes		
1995	Skunkhour	Sunstone Part Of The Solution		Yes	Yes	
1995	Boom Crash Opera	Tongue Tied		Yes		
1995	Hunters & Collectors	Living...In Large Rooms and Lounges		Yes		
1995	Hunters & Collectors	Living Single...In Large Rooms and Lounges		Yes		
1995	Horsehead	Liar		Yes		
1994	Horsehead	Sun		Yes		
1994	Area 7	Demo Tape		Yes		
1994	The Sharp	Sonic Tripod		Yes		
1994	The Sharp	Honest and Sober		Yes		
1994	The Sharp	Alone Like Me	Yes	Yes		
1994	Boom Crash Opera	Gimme		Yes		
1994	The Breadmakers	The Night The Moon Forgot To Rise		Yes		
1994	Scarymother	Tai Laeo	Yes			
1994	Scarymother	Looking Down	Yes			
1994	Hunters & Collectors	Easy	Yes			
1994	Hunters & Collectors	Back In The Hole		Yes		
1994	Hunters & Collectors	Demon Flower		Yes		
1994	David McComb	Love Of Will		Yes		
1994	Crowded House	Pineapple Head		Yes		
1994	Killing Joke	Pandemonium		Yes		
1994	Insurge	I.M.F.	Yes			
1993	Truckasaurus	Truckasaurus		Yes		
1993	The Sharp	Train of Thought		Yes		
1993	No Comply	Buzz		Yes		
1993	Wings	Bazooka Penaka		Yes		
1993	The Sharp	Scratch My Back		Yes		
1993	Crowded House	Together Alone		Yes		
1993	The Sharp	This Is the Sharp	Yes			
1993	The Makers	Hokey Pokey	Yes			
1992	David Hosking	Slow Runners		Yes		
1992	Joe Creighton	Hollywell		Yes		
1992	Josie Jason And The Argonauts	Medusa Goes To Market		Yes		
1992	The Sharp	Spinosity		Yes		
1992	Soulscraper	Heard It All Before		Yes		
1993	Aqualads	So Good		Yes		
1991	Cezary Skubiszewski	SOUNDeSCAPE		Yes		
1991	The Killjoys	Spin		Yes		
1991	Third Eye	Third Eye		Yes		
1990	Straitjacket Fitz	Melt		Yes		

== MEJU single/album releases ==
- Eternal (May 2023)
- Well Done (April 2020)
- Change (May 2020)
- Turnaround (June 2020)
- All Is Good (November 2020)
- Used To Have A Job feat. Pesky Bones (Peter Farnan) (November 2020)

== MEJU productions ==
- Anactoria - Good Mind
- Khristian Mizzi - Hold Onto Me
- Datson + Hughes - Flowers and the Axe
- Kate Jukes & The Blue Healers - Heart One
