= Music of Adelaide =

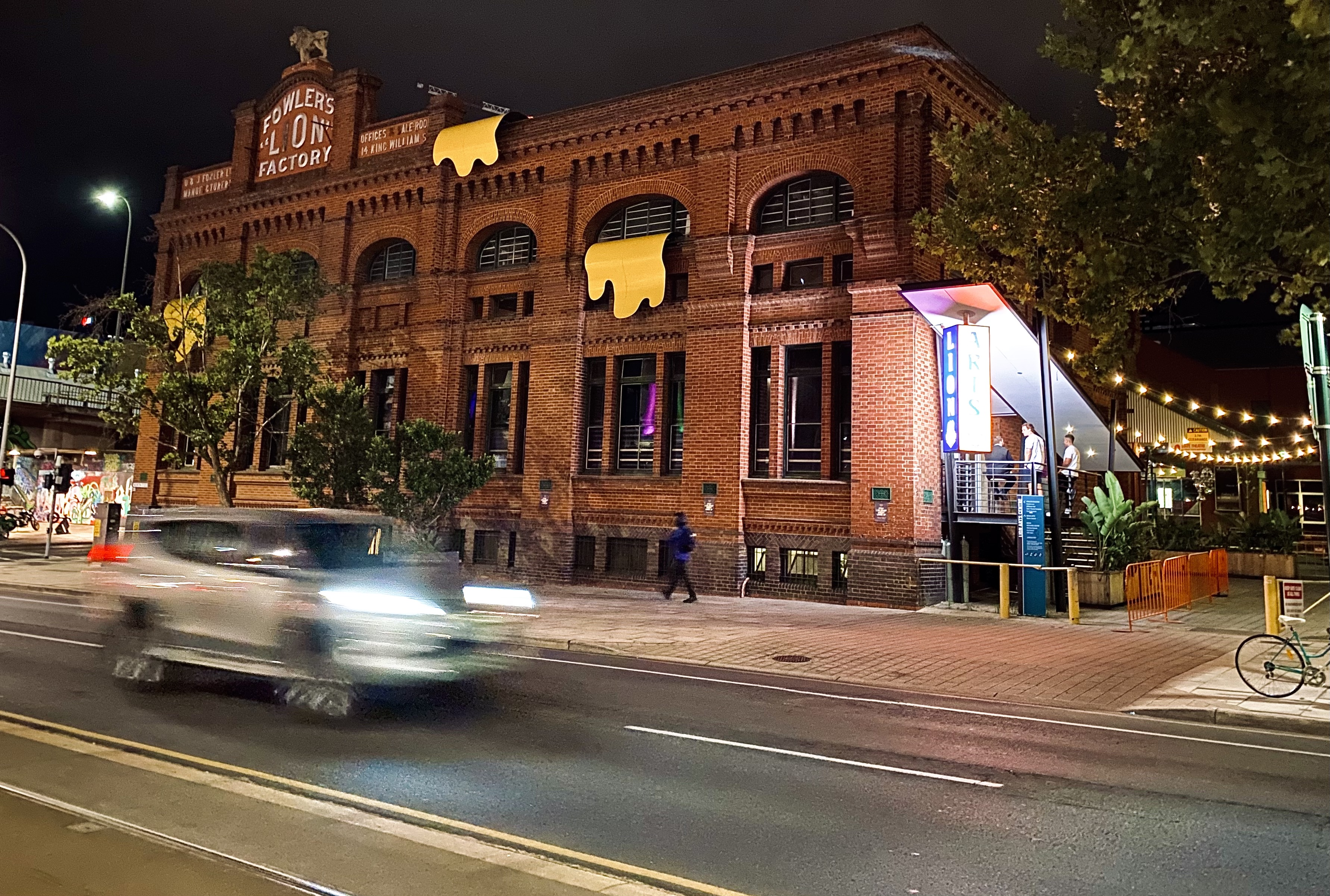
The Lion Arts Centre in Adelaide's West End at night. The venue has hosted live music since 1986.

Music of Adelaide includes music relating to the city of Adelaide, South Australia. It includes all genres of both live and recorded music by artists born or living in the city, live music events happening in the city, and other aspects of the music industry relating to Adelaide.

Adelaide is a UNESCO City of Music. It enjoys several annual music festivals and awards, and possibly has more live music venues per capita than any other capital city in the Southern Hemisphere. Organisations such as Music SA and the Music Development Office (MDO), backed by the state government, help to nurture the live music industry and the careers of emerging artists.

Artists of some renown such as Sia, Paul Kelly, Redgum, Cold Chisel, Adelaide Symphony Orchestra, Hilltop Hoods, No Fixed Address and Guy Sebastian originate from the city.

== Live music ==
=== 2013: Reverb report leads to new support ===
In 2012, the Don Dunstan Foundation, in partnership with Adelaide City Council, the Australia Council, Arts SA, Adelaide Fringe, the Department of the Premier and Cabinet and Regional Development Australia Barossa, hired British music promoter Martin Elbourne as Thinker in Residence on a project named "Reverb". The project aimed "to create collaboration and unified action for a healthy, more sustainable music scene" in South Australia. A report based on his recommendations was produced in 2013, entitled The future of live music in South Australia.

As a result of Elbourne's report, the Music Development Office (MDO) and adjunct St Paul's Creative Centre were created by the state government (then under Arts SA, now CreateSA) in 2014, with the goal of "build[ing] pathways into creative and industry development, with city vibrancy and economic benefit being the ultimate outcomes", which it does by facilitating grants, fellowships and other means of developing the careers of contemporary musicians. St Paul's Creative Centre was closed in 2023.

A new independent body called Musitec and an advisory body known as the Music Industry Council were also established.

=== City of Music ===
Adelaide was awarded a UNESCO City of Music title from the United Nations in late 2015, after an application driven by the Festival Centre, the Music Development Office and Adelaide City Council. It was the 19th city to gain the status.

In 2015, it was said that there were more live music venues per capita in Adelaide than any other capital city in the southern hemisphere, and Lonely Planet labelled Adelaide “Australia’s live music city”.

=== 2017–2020: Live Music Action Plan ===
In 2017 the City of Adelaide produced a report entitled Adelaide: City of Music: Live Music Action Plan 2017−2020, after holding its first Live Music Summit to coincide with a visit by other global UNESCO Cities of Music on 8 March 2017. The report outlined the council's strategic plan and role in sustaining live music in the city.

=== Live music events ===
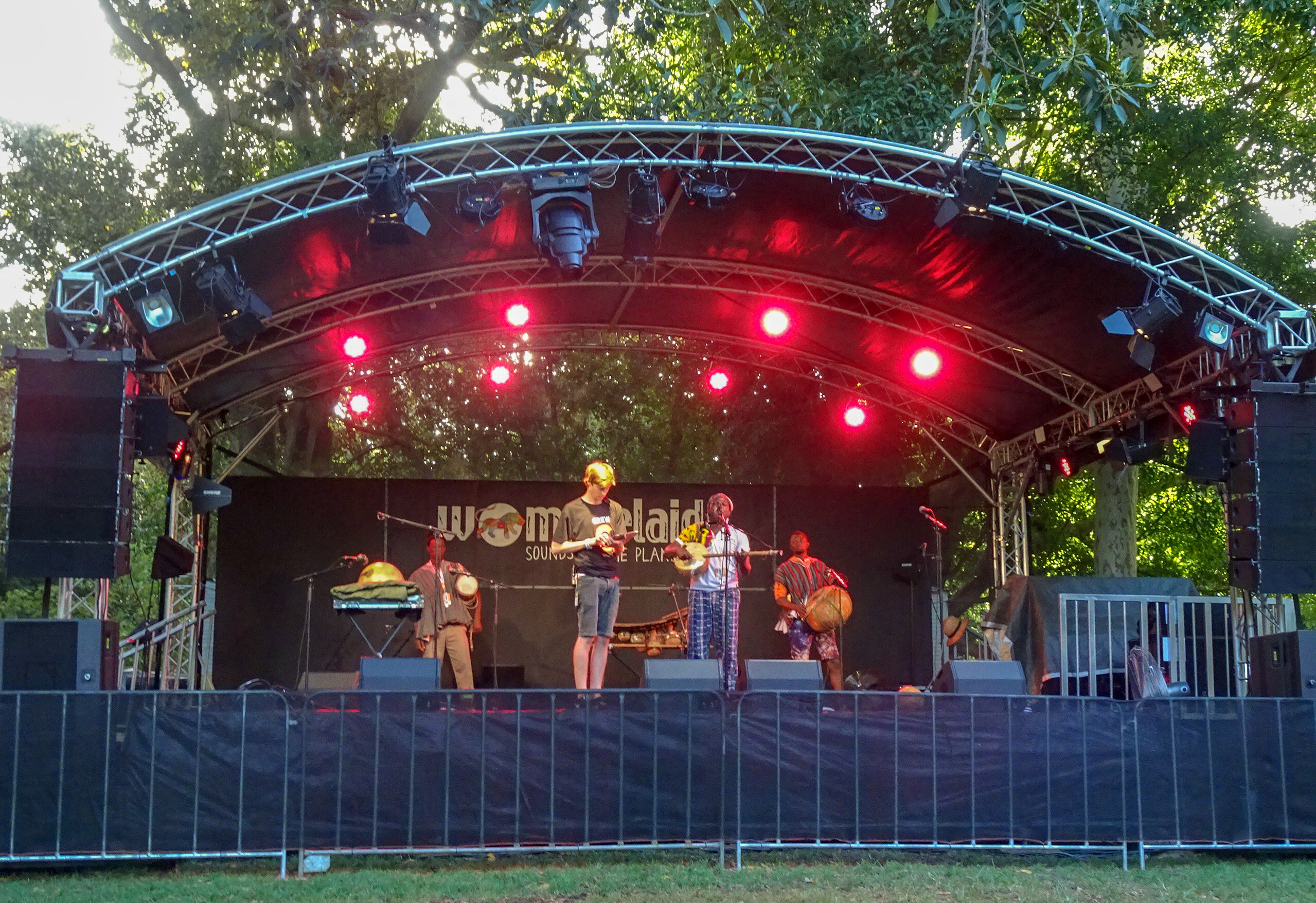
Musicians on a stage at WOMADelaide 2020

The city and surrounding area showcases many different genres of music with international and local artists in events such as the Adelaide Festival of Arts, Barossa Music Festival, Adelaide Fringe, the world music festival WOMADelaide (held annually in Botanic Park), the Adelaide Guitar Festival and the Adelaide Cabaret Festival.

Music SA is a not-for-profit organisation founded in 1997 to promote, support and develop contemporary music in South Australia, which it does by providing training at many levels, professional development advice and live performance opportunities. Among its other activities, it has run the annual Umbrella: Winter City Sounds event since 2016, growing each year. Described as "a grass roots organic creation that is made up of local venues and mainly local performers", it offered over 350 live events in 2018. In association with the biennial Adelaide Guitar Festival, it presents "Guitars in Bars" each year, as part of Umbrella.

The touring music festival, St Jerome's Laneway Festival, visits Adelaide each February with a range of contemporary artists, since 2014 at Hart's Mill in Port Adelaide.

The first Adelaide Jazz Festival was held in 2023.

== Classical music ==
The Adelaide Symphony Orchestra was founded in 1937, with William Cade as conductor. The ASO often plays for the State Opera of South Australia, the Adelaide Youth Orchestra and Adelaide Chamber Singers.

== Music education ==
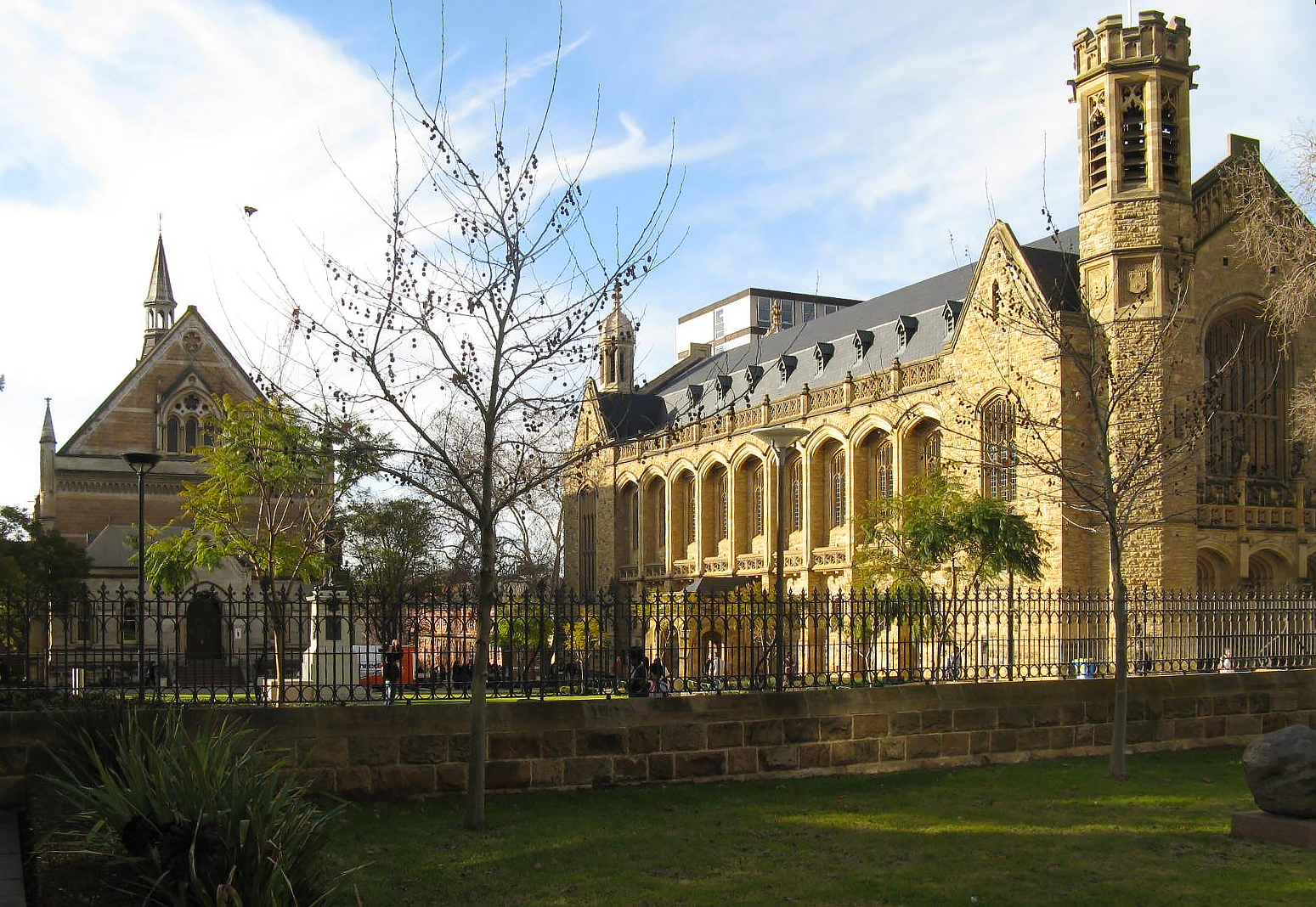
The front of Bonython Hall and the Adelaide Conservatorium at the University of Adelaide.

Music education starts in primary and secondary public and private schools across the state. A number of public schools (19 as of 2019 have been designated "music focus schools" by an Education Department program called Instrumental Music (IM). Some of these are the APY Lands schools, Marryatville High School, Open Access College and Whyalla High School.

The primary tertiary academy of music is the Elder Conservatorium at the University of Adelaide.

In the south-east of the state at Mount Gambier, James Morrison opened the James Morrison Academy of Music – a tertiary level, dedicated jazz school offering a degree in jazz performance.

== Music organisations ==
As well as those mentioned above (Music SA, Music Development Office, etc.) there are other organisations based in Adelaide which focus on various aspects of the music industry.

SCALA (Songwriters, Composers, and Lyricists Association) is a non-profit, incorporated association, founded in November 1987 in Adelaide. Its goal is to support and encourage songwriters, composers, and lyricists in any style and genre, regardless of their level of skill and experience. It runs a venue for original music, workshops, the annual FOOM (Festival of Original Music) Song Competition, and regularly releases albums of original music (the 23rd such CD being released in 2015). SCALA also hosts special events, often at the Wheatsheaf Hotel in the inner western suburb of Thebarton, such as "Showcasing Aboriginal Artists" in June 2019.

== Awards and events ==
From 2017 to 2020, the South Australian Government’s newly established Live Music Events Fund promised funding to the AIR (Australian Independent Record Labels Association) Awards and concurrent music conference, to take place at the Queen's Theatre in Adelaide. The events take place in July, along with Music SA's Umbrella: Winter City Sounds, a program of live music across Adelaide, and a couple of food and wine festivals in the city.

Music SA presents the annual South Australian Music Awards (SAM Awards), which replaced the Fowler's Live Awards from 2015, with support from the MDO, APRA AMCOS, and other sponsors. The 2019 Awards are to be held at the Bonython Hall in November.

SCALA presents the annual FOOM (Festival of Original Music) Song Competition, with the finals awards event held in September at the Wheatsheaf Hotel.

The Robert Stigwood Fellowship Program was established by the MDO in 2014, named in honour of South Australian expat music entrepreneur Robert Stigwood. Fellowships are offered annually, providing mentorship and professional development to local musicians and entrepreneurs by Stu MacQueen and Dan Crannitch of Wonderlick Entertainment. Past winners have included Teenage Joans, East Av3, George Alice, West Thebarton, Tkay Maidza, Electric Fields, and Bad Dreems. In 2024, Dem Mob, Nathan May, and Coldwave were among the artists granted the fellowships.

In September 2023, the MDO provided funding for the formation of the Independent Live Venues Alliance (ILVA), comprising seven independent music venues in South Australia: the Grace Emily Hotel, Jive, and the Broadcast Bar in the city centre; inner-metro venues The Governor Hindmarsh and Wheatsheaf Hotel; along with the Semaphore Workers Club in Semaphore and the Murray Delta Juke Joint on the Fleurieu Peninsula. The group's first event was the four-day "Everyday Event", with 14 gigs hosted across the venues between 19 and October 2023.

== Local radio ==
Local community radio stations Fresh 92.7 and Radio Adelaide play and promote local music.

== Venues ==
Music venues for live music of all types and for musicians at all levels of experience include the Adelaide Entertainment Centre, Thebarton Theatre, Adelaide Festival Centre, Elder Hall, Adelaide Town Hall, Nexus Multicultural Arts Centre, Lion Arts Factory, The Gov, and a host of smaller pubs, theatres and halls.

=== List ===
- Adelaide Entertainment Centre
- Adelaide Festival Centre
- Adelaide UniBar
- Crown & Anchor (The Cranker)
- Exeter Hotel
- Governor Hindmarsh Hotel (The Gov)
- Grace Emily Hotel
- Lion Arts Factory
- The Jade, formerly Jade Monkey
- Jive
- The Highway Hotel, Plympton (occasional)
- Rhino Room
- Rocket Bar & Rooftop
- Thebarton Theatre (Thebby)
- The Hotel Metropolitan (The Metro)
- The Wheatsheaf Hotel (Wheaty)

== Musicians of note ==
Adelaide has produced a number of popular bands and musicians, including Australian hip-hop crew Hilltop Hoods, pub-rock act Cold Chisel (and soloist Jimmy Barnes), and Australian Idol winner Guy Sebastian.

Other popular bands include Atlas Genius, Testeagles, Eric Bogle, The Mark of Cain and the Superjesus. American Ben Folds has also lived in the city, inspiring his song titled "Adelaide" from the album Super D.

Electric Fields, winners of the 2016 Emily Burrows Award and Best New Talent in the 2017 National Indigenous Music Awards as well as being a contestant for representing Australia at the Eurovision Song Contest, hail from Adelaide.

=== List ===
The following is a list of some artists, past and present, originating in Adelaide and/or based in Adelaide.

- Adelaide Symphony Orchestra
- Adelaide Youth Orchestra
- Amber Calling
- Atlas Genius
- Australian Pink Floyd Show
- Bad//Dreems
- Bit by Bats
- Chalice
- City Riots
- Clowns of Decadence
- Coerce
- Cold Chisel
- Double Dragon
- Electric Fields
- Embodiment 12:14
- Exploding White Mice
- Fear and Loathing
- Fire! Santa Rosa, Fire!
- Fraternity
- Funkoars
- Fury
- Guy Sebastian
- Headband
- Hilltop Hoods
- Hindley Street Country Club
- I Killed the Prom Queen
- In Fiction
- Iwantja (band)
- JAB
- James Taylor Move
- Jimmy Barnes
- King Snake Roost
- Leader Cheetah
- Lowrider
- Mere Theory
- No Fixed Address
- Orianthi
- Paul Kelly
- Redgum
- Reece Mastin
- Seraphs Coal
- Sia
- Screaming Believers
- Testeagles
- The Angels
- The Audreys
- The Dairy Brothers
- The Hot Lies
- The Mad Turks from Istanbul
- The Mark of Cain
- The Masters Apprentices
- The Open Season
- The Shaolin Afronauts
- The Sundance Kids
- The Superjesus
- The Sweets of Sin
- The Transatlantics
- The Vibrants
- Unitopia
- Universum (band)
- The Urban Guerillas
- Virgin Black
- Wes Carr
- Where's the Pope?
- Wolf & Cub
- Wrench
- Young Adelaide Voices
- Zephyr Quartet
- Zoot (band)

== See also ==
- Adelaide Music Collective
- List of festivals in South Australia
- SA Music Hall of Fame
