= ACE Open =

Coordinates: 34°55′21″S 138°35′34″E

- Former name: Contemporary Art Centre of South Australia & Australian Experimental Art Foundation
- Established: 2017
- Location: Lion Arts Centre, Adelaide
- Type: Contemporary art gallery
- Director: Patrice Sharkey
- CEO: Louise Dunn
- Chairperson: Kate Irving
- Website: aceopen.art

ACE Open (Adelaide Contemporary Experimental) is a contemporary visual art organisation based in Adelaide, South Australia, established in 2017 after the Contemporary Art Centre of South Australia and the Australian Experimental Art Foundation (AEAF) were merged, creating a new organisation.

== History ==
The Experimental Art Foundation (EAF) was created in the Adelaide suburb of St Peters in 1974 by a breakaway group of CACSA members, with the intention of focusing on "more radical, multi-disciplinary and performance work". These artists and theorists, initiated by Donald Brook, and joined by Bert Flugelman (who had moved from Sydney at Brook's suggestion), Ian North, Clifford Frith, and Phil Noyce, wanted to promote the idea of art as "radical and only incidentally aesthetic", and encourage new approaches to creating art. Its stated mission was "to assist, promote and develop, through production, exhibition, distribution and the encouragement of debate, art and art practices that are analytical, critical and experimental, which challenge established thinking and expand cultural discourse". According to Brook, the EAF was "an engine for shaping beliefs about the meaning of works of art and the point of making them". Its exhibitions displayed the work of both Australian and international experimental and performance artists; In 1976, artist Phillip Gerner gave a 24-hour performance as a human jam-tasting facility, after having a feeding tube and catheter inserted into his body.

Printmaker Ruth Faerber, reviewing an exhibition of Adelaide art at the Art Gallery of NSW in 1977, compared the EAF with the Progressive Art Movement, which was "motivated by a strong Marxist sociopolitical direction, agreed to a shared program for action and a sense of immediate imperative". By contrast the EAF, did not commit to a set of agreed aims, and stated that they had an "open ended" attitude against mainstream, non-conformism as against entrenched doctrines, "experimentation as against patrician formalism".

In 1992 the re-purposed factory building which became the Lion Arts Centre included a purpose-built gallery, artist studios, offices and the Dark Horsey Bookshop, which focused on art-related publications. Renamed the Australian Experimental Art Foundation (AEAF) along the way, the organisation ran a residency program, which supported several leading South Australian artists. The AEAF was mainly funded by the federal government through the Australia Council and the Government of South Australia through Arts SA.

From August 2016 the Contemporary Art Centre of South Australia (CACSA) started talks to merge with AEAF, after two rounds of severe funding cuts to the Australia Council in the federal government budgets of 2014/15 and 2015/16. Arts SA provided funding for the two organisations to cover operational costs for 2017, which enabled planning for the merger, which was named ACE Open. After the merger had been decided, the Australia Council provided further funding to ACE Open to help with its setup costs.

The new gallery opened its inaugural exhibition, BLACKFLAG, featuring the work of South Australian painter Christian Lock, on 15 March 2017.

== Description ==
The organisation, which is also known as Adelaide Contemporary Experimental, is located in the Lion Arts Centre (the former location of the AEAF) in the West End of North Terrace, in an area specifically designed for artistic use, including a gallery, office space and artist's studios. It also incorporates a free space, formerly the Dark Horsey bookshop, which can be used for events and other purposes, and includes the former Feast Festival rooms across the laneway. It presents an annual program of free exhibitions by South Australian, Australian and international artists, and hosts events including artist talks, workshops, celebrations and screenings.

ACE Open is a member of Contemporary Art Organisations Australia (CAOA, formerly CAOs), a network of "public, independent, non-collecting contemporary art organisations" from around Australia that serves is an advocacy body for Australian small to medium contemporary visual arts bodies, thus helping to promote the work of living artists.

== Governance ==
ACE Open's inaugural CEO in 2017 was Liz Nowell, former CEO of CACSA. Nowell was appointed director of the Institute of Modern Art Brisbane in March 2019.

In March 2021 the artistic director was Patrice Sharkey, and executive director (ED) is Louise Dunn (who previously led Nexus Arts, 2012–2019). Rainer Jozeps was chair of the board, which included artist James Darling AM and writer and museum curator Jared Thomas.

Sharkey left in February 2024 and the end of February 2024, when Danni (Danielle) Zuvela became artistic director. As of June 2024 Louise Dunn remains ED, while Amanda Pepe is chair. The board includes entrepreneur and film producer Anton Andreacchio and artist Yhonnie Scarce.

== Notable exhibitions ==
From 1 June to 10 August 2024, ACE Open is running an exhibition curated by curated by Alexandra Nitschke, entitled Entities: The Concepts and Post-Object Exhibitions. This exhibition showcases the work of the Contemporary Art Society (CAS) and the Experimental Art Foundation (EAF), and is partly based on former exhibitions held by these entities: the 1974 CAS exhibition Concepts (which included works by Mike Parr); and the 1976 EAF exhibition Australian and New Zealand Post-Object Show – A Survey. It also includes other original materials, such as posters, essays, and video clips which demonstrate some of the experimental artists' radical practices.
