= Fuse Festival =

Music festival in Adelaide, 1996–2013

Coordinates: 34°55′24.10″S 138°35′44.13″E

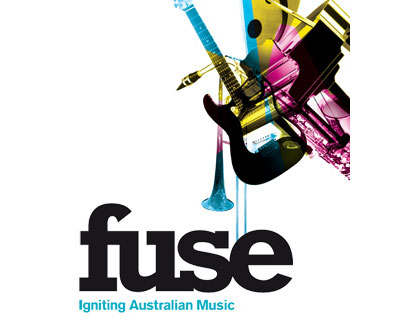
- Fuse 2011 Poster
- Genre: New Australian Music
- Dates: mid-February
- Locations: Adelaide, South Australia
- Years active: 1996–2013?
- Organiser: Alistair Cranny
- Website: Official website – archived

Fuse or Fuse Festival, formerly Music Business Adelaide and Eat the Street, was an Australian contemporary music event held annually in the South Australian capital of Adelaide, from 1996 until 2012 or 2013. It showcased Australian musicians covering a wide range of genres in venues in the West End of Adelaide to industry professionals and fans, growing to three days in November 2003.

The Fuse conference was a branch of the event, with international and Australian delegates. Both the festival and the conference aimed at imparting skills to emerging talent in the industry as well as networking.

Fuse was a not-for-profit, largely government-funded event, managed by Music SA and the Adelaide Fringe, with a focus upon deriving outcomes for all those who attend the events.

The Fuse events finished after 2012, after which there was a Fuse Presents program, which presented a travelling scholarship to a musician in 2013.

== Early history ==
Fuse Festival first ran as Music Business Adelaide in 1996 as an industry development conference, based loosely upon the South By Southwest (SXSW) model for music conferences. It was a non-profit event, supported by state (largely through Arts SA and federal (Australia Council) government funding. In 2001, it published the compilation CD "Eat the Street" selected from music played at the event.

By 2003, the name had changed to Fuse Festival.

Music SA were at least partly responsible for Fuse.

In 2006 the move to house Fuse Festival within the Adelaide Fringe organisation was instrumental to the development of the event, part of the Fringe's mission statement being to "encourage, support and assist independent artists in the development and presentation of their work".

In 2007, Peter Garrett gave a speech at the conference.

== Fuse 2008 ==
In 2008 Fuse focused on audience development, covering festivals, touring, social networking, promotion and media and publishing. In conjunction with Fuse Festival, the South Australian Film Corporation announced an initiative to help support South Australian musicians and filmmakers to collaborate.

Speakers for 2008 included: Angela Beal, Martin Elbourne, Matthew Proft, Michael Chugg, Nathan McLay, Owen Orford, PJ Murton, Rev Moose and many others.

=== Explode ===
"Explode", a celebration and networking time for the delegates and conference attendees, was held to herald the beginning of the conference. Eight bands were selected from around Australia to play and radio stations Nova and ABC Triple J held competitions to allocate two remaining slots on this bill. The winners were, respectively, The Transatlantics and Eva Popov.

Explode Bands for 2008 were: The Devoted Few, The Transatlantics, FunkOars, Leah Flanagan, City Riots, New Season Black, Eva Popov, Leader Cheetah, Tin Alley

=== Ignition ===
"Ignition", an uncurated event, was the open showcase for the Fuse Festival. Any band could register to attend the conference and play a show, by finding a venue and negotiating with other bands performing that night.

57 bands registered to play Ignition that year, in 25 venues in the Adelaide city centre.

== Fuse 2009 ==
Fuse 2009 was opened by keynote speaker Glenn Wheatley. This was the first year the Explode showcase took place in Rymill Park. The Ignition showcase night featured a large number of bands.

=== 2009 Explode Bands ===
The 2009 Explode bands were: Behind Crimson Eyes, Cloud Control, Poetikool Justice, The Shiny Brights, The Sundance Kids, FisherKing, Jess Ribeiro and the Bone Collectors, and The Touch.

== Fuse 2010 ==
The 2010 Fuse conference was opened by keynote speaker John Woodruff. The Ignition night again featured a large number of bands.

=== 2010 Explode Bands ===
The 2010 Explode Bands were: KingFisha, The Beards, Mayfield, Foxx on Fire, Delta, The Paper Scissors, The Swiss, and Hungry Kids of Hungary.

== Fuse 2011 ==
For 2011 Fuse changed the structure of the festival, working more closely with the Adelaide Fringe in order to improve the benefits for showcase bands. "Fuse West" and "Fuse East" split what previously was the "Ignition" showcase night. On the final night of the festival, eight bands would take the Fuse stage to coincide with the Adelaide Fringe Opening night. There were two days of conference, and masterclasses in management and songwriting.

== Fuse 2012 ==
Fuse West, Fuse East and Fuse@Fringe

== 2012–2013: Fuse Presents ==
Fuse Presents was a new program slated for 2012–2013 to help support and inspire South Australian musicians and industry representatives in the development of their business and craft.

In 2013, multi-instrumentalist and composer Alies Sluiter won the 2013 Fuse Presents SXSW Travel Award to the United States.

As of 2019, it appears to have been defunct since 2013.
