= Ráv Thomas =

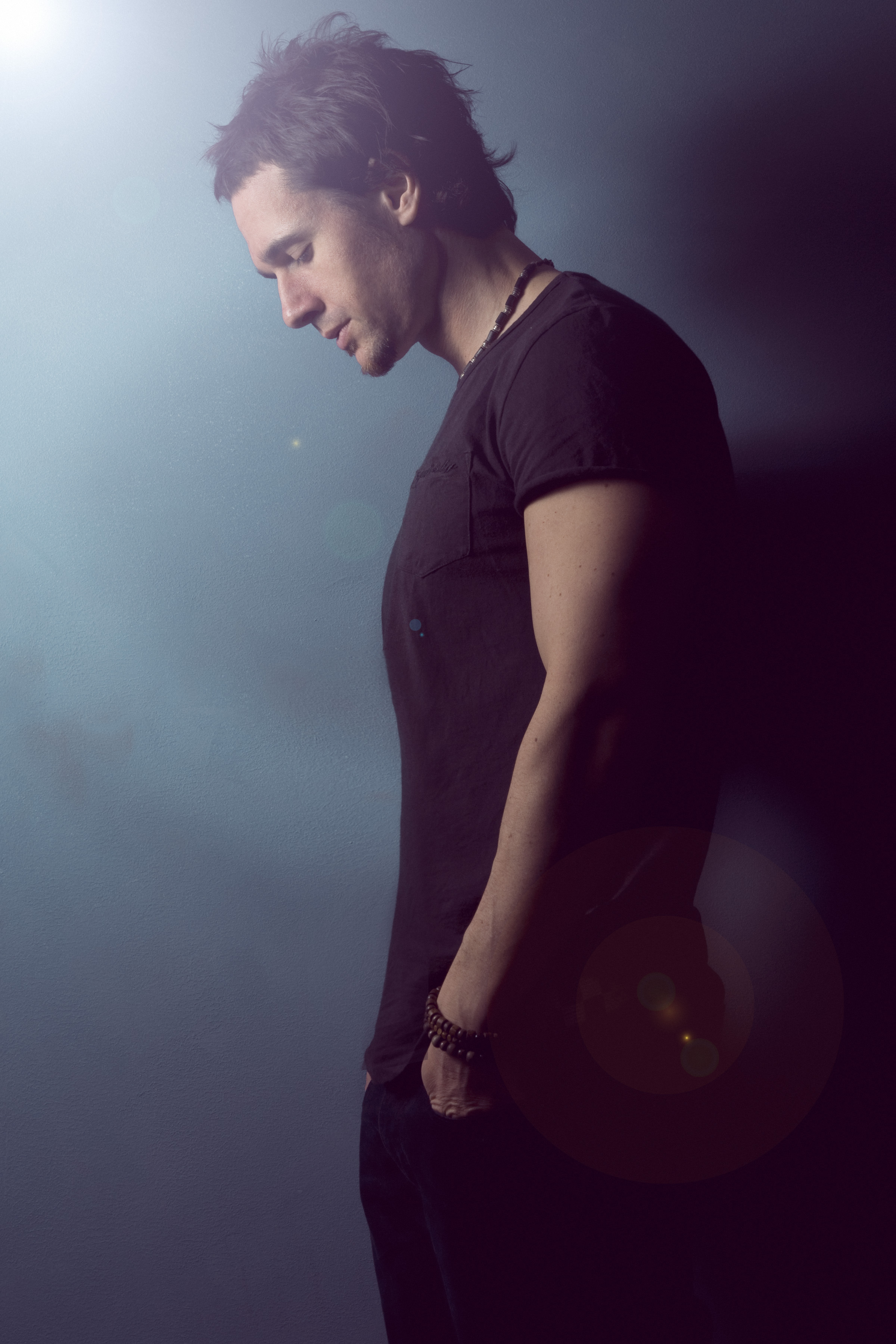
- Photo Taken in Melbourne, Australia 2010

Background information
- Born: Melbourne, Australia
- Genres: Rock, pop, alternative rock
- Years active: 2007–present
- Labels: Independent
- Website: www.ravthomas.com.au

Ráv Thomas is a solo singer-songwriter from Launceston, Australia. In 2009 Ráv Thomas toured Australia extensively performing with multi ARIA award winner Vanessa Amorosi, Evermore, Thirsty Merc, Kate Ceberano, Jimmy Barnes, Mental As Anything, Diesel, Toni Childs, James Reyne.

In August 2009, Thomas charted consecutively and later peaked at number 2 on the ARIA singles charts with debut EP Lily which also reached number 2 on the AMO (Australian Music Office)and number 2 on the AIR Charts (Australian Independent Record Labels Association).

In 2010, Thomas released Like a Game Show Host which was recorded at Woodstock Studios and produced by ARIA nominated Record producer, engineer Robin Mai (John Butler, Augie March, Jet, The Temper Trap.) The lead single Like A Game Show Host later charted at no 1 on the ARIA physical singles charts.

== History ==
=== Early years ===
In the early years Ráv Thomas grew up playing piano and began singing to audiences while still a child. He first started writing original music from the age of 7 in his hometown of Launceston, Tasmania.

He played piano through primary school, and by the time he reached high school in Launceston he was proficiently playing guitar and later formed his first rock band.

=== Name ===
Ráv's first name is (pronounced "Rarv") – is short for Ravi – the acute accent (Á) changes the ‘a’ sound to ‘ah’ or ‘ar’.

== Discography ==
=== Singles ===
List of singles, with selected chart positions
Title	Year	Peak chart positions		
Title	Year	AUS	ARIA Physical	AIR
"Lily"	2009	86	2	2
"Like a Game Show Host"	2010	62	1	—

== See also ==
- Music of Australia

== Sources ==
- ARIA
- ARIA
- Myspace
- CMI
- Robin Mai
- ARIA
- Newswire
- Auspop
- Auspop
- Flop of the Pops
- What News
