= Roxie's =

Roxie's may refer to:

- Roxie's (Adelaide), a former bar-restaurant in Adelaide, South Australia
- Roxie's (Las Vegas), a former brothel in Las Vegas, Nevada, US
