= Tin Alley =

Australian rock band

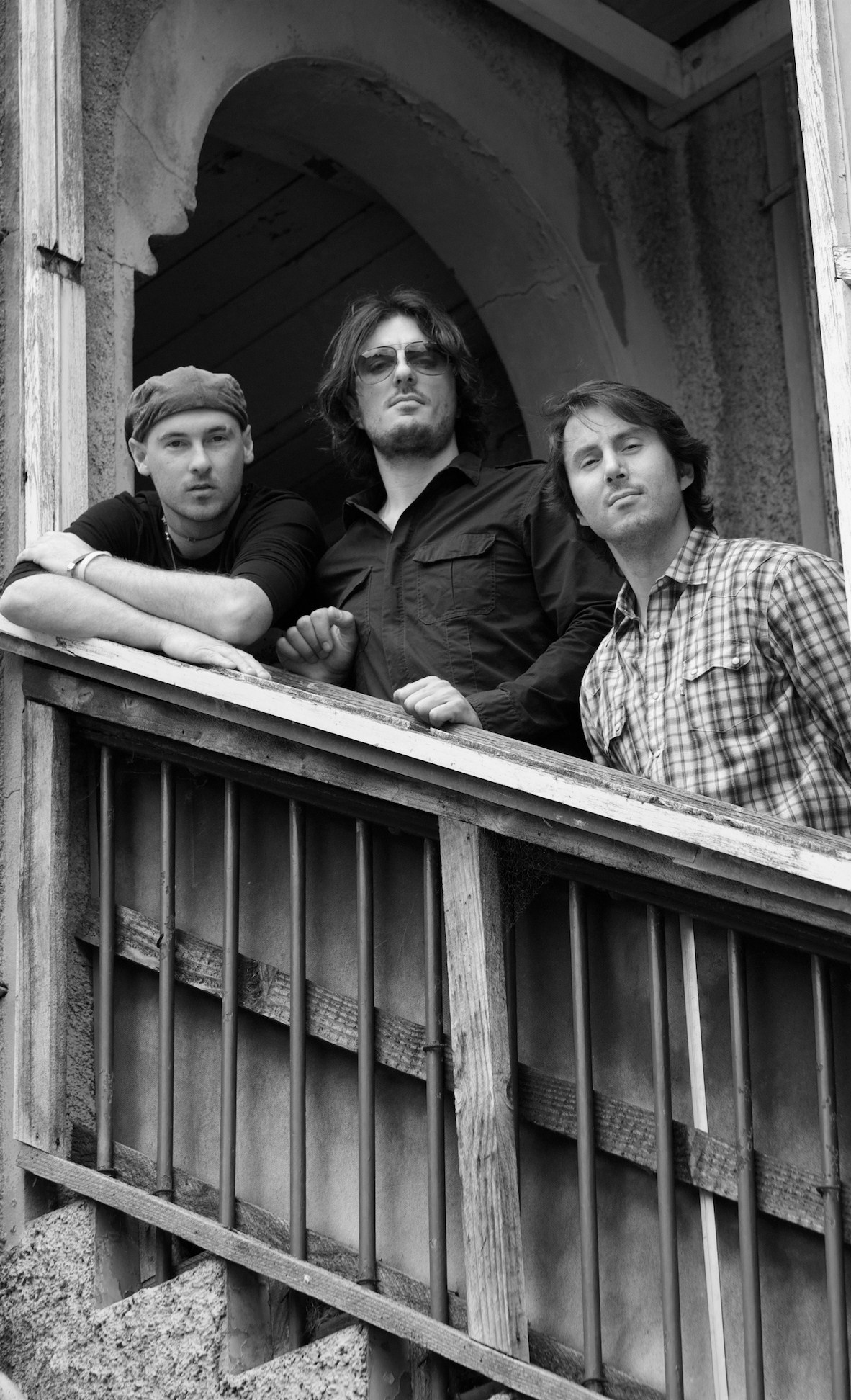
- Tin Alley in the Old Convent, 2 July 2009

Background information
- Origin: Melbourne, Victoria, Australia
- Genres: Rock, new wave, alternative rock
- Years active: 1998–2016
- Label: Independent
- Past members: Jim Siourthas; Peter Hofbauer; Paul Siourthas; Stefan Waltersson; Kesh Charitra; Andrew Carter; Kieran Murphy; Nicholas van Niel
- Website: Official website

Tin Alley are an Australian rock band from Melbourne formed in 2007 by brothers Paul and Jim Siourthas, and Peter Hofbauer.

The band released one studio album, Everyturn (2007). Tin Alley's first single, "In Your Hands", charted consecutively and peaked at number 13 between John Butler and Sneaky Sound System in the Australian indie charts.

In 2009, Tin Alley's release "Out of Control" reached number 1 on the Australian Music Office charts and was at number 1 on the Australian Independent Record Labels Association charts for five consecutive weeks. In November 2009, "Out of Control" reached no.7 on the ARIA Australian singles charts and was in the ARIA Charts top 20 for six consecutive weeks. In early 2010, Tin Alley had a special dance version of "Out of Control" mixed by Luke Chable. In February 2010, the Luke Chable Vs Tin Alley "Out of Control" dance mix was used on many shows and radio playlisted programs Australia wide. In August 2010, "Out of Control" was featured and marketed internationally by the fashion company Billabong as part of the 2010 Designers Closet Series.

In mid August 2010, Tin Alley released Monster (Pop), a special pop edit taken from the group's original rock version mixed by David Treahearn and Rob Haggett in the UK. Soon after its release, lead singer and guitarist Jim Siourthas left the band for personal reasons.

In July 2011, Stefan Waltersson briefly joined the group and in September Tin Alley released "Ride the Wave", written by Jim Siourthas, Peter Hofbauer & Paul Siourthas, which was voted by the music network as a top ten release (a song recorded the previous year) in Queensland. "Ride The Wave" and "Bounce Back" were later played nationally on commercial play-listed programs.

During the "Bounce Back" release in September 2011, Paul Siourthas signed an endorsement with Australian guitar manufacture Maton. March 2013 saw Andrew Carter join the group to finalise the line up as lead vocalist which then saw the addition of guitarist Kieran Murphy, a member of Carter's previous band.

In December 2013 Tin Alley returned to the studio where they recorded The Ghost EP in Queensland. March 2014 saw the group release the first of three tracks under The Ghost EP titled "Chosen Few".

== History ==
=== Early years ===
Tin Alley signing autographs at the PAOK Soccer Club Headquarters in November 2008. Left to right: Paul Siourthas, Jim Siourthas, Paok Director, Peter Hofbauer.

Brothers Jim and Paul Siourthas grew up in Reservoir. Paul received his first guitar at age eight.

The Siourthas brothers formed the group Everything in early 1998 with friends Bill Wall and Angelo on Bass. In 1998 drummer Peter Hofbauer of Austrian descent read an ad in The Sunday Herald and after two auditions joined the band Everything.

In 2006, after producing some demo recordings at Melbourne records, Paul invited numerous labels and profile managers to various shows and showcases. In the process, Jim helped facilitate their progression in musical style from Indie rock to the more hard rock approach that is now their trademark. On the strength of these demos, Mark Huxley took the band to meet with executives at MGM Distribution where they were immediately signed to a distribution deal.

=== 2007 ===
Tin Alley's debut album, entitled Everyturn, was released in Australia on 17 October 2007, released along with its lead single, "In Your Hands". It peaked at number 13 and 17 consecutively in the AIR Charts. Due to the success of Tin Alley's first independent release, another single from the album was released through MGM titled "Polar Bear".

The video clip for Polar Bear was filmed and directed in the United States of America by producer Max Rubitzky and proved to be an underground university hit in the United States. The track Polar Bear was only a digital release through MGM, unlike "In Your Hands" which was marketed to Australian record stores.

In mid-2007, Tin Alley was voted in as 3RRR album of the week and soon found themselves playing on numerous TV shows such as The Breakfast Show and doing guest appearances and acoustic performances on various radio stations.

In December 2007 Tin Alley were struck down with the near loss of Drummer Peter Hofbauer from a serious motorbike accident stopping the band in the midst of their first Australian tour.

It takes more than broken bones to keep me away from what I love most.

— Peter Hofbauer

=== 2008 ===
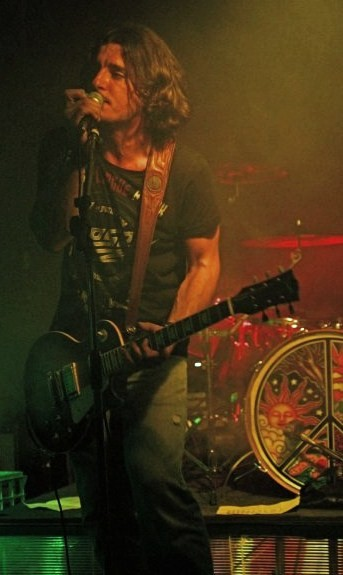
Tin Alley live at the FUSE Festival in South Australia, 2008.

In late 2008, Tin Alley were back and began work on their second release Crossing Paths. The EP was written and recorded in Queensland and produced by Stuart Stuart who has also worked with The Veronicas and Small Mercies and many other Australian artists.

=== 2009 ===
For any band worth their salt, there comes a time in their evolution when they get tired of messing around—a point of all-or-nothing.
And when that point is reached, the world around them—producers, promoters, fans—seem to come together in an unspoken recognition that something big is about to happen. For Tin Alley, that time is now.

— Jesse Shrock, 05/08/09

In October 2009, the title track Out of Control was released to national radio as the lead single from the 2010 EP release Crossing Paths. The track Out of Control was written by Tin Alley and had spawned from drummer Hofbauer's near death experience at the age of 27.

The number 27 had led Tin Alley to delve deep into the history of the 27 Club that further led them basing the lyrics in general on that theme and even quoting Kurt Cobain's last words in his suicide note "Best to burn out bright than fade into the night" in the final seconds of the track.

In early November 2009 Tin Alley made the top 100 on the ARIA Charts and in the weeks to follow Out of Control also made No.1 spots on AIR Charts and AMO "Australian Music Office" Charts for six consecutive weeks and later peaked at number 7 on the ARIA Australian Singles Chart in early December. The track "Out of Control" also featured as mover of the month on the Jägermeister AIR Charts and was the fourth most added track to National radio and a week later got inducted into the 27 club hall of fame.

Unplugged Session Tour 2009 / 2010

During the bands Out of Control release Tin Alley were busy on their national Unplugged Sessions Tour. The Media Acoustic Tour kick started in Queensland that spanned across Australia over a four-month period from November 2009 to March 2010. While the band were in Sydney Jim mentioned on the Ugly Phil show on Triple M:

It was a tough time for the band being on the road for days on end. We were up for 25 hrs one day and running late for an Interview and at that time we were under a lot of pressure"

— Jim Siourthas Triple M 12/03/10

In December Tin Alley came back to Melbourne to play a special showcase performance supporting Boom Crash Opera for their Christmas party in Melbourne along with other guests on the night such as Taxiride.

"Tin Alley Interview On Hot100 " (03/12/2009)
Interview with Tin Alley on the Hot 100 Show.

=== 2010 ===
Tin Alley were invited to assist Juke Kartel on their Return To Australia Tour with other special guests Electric Mary. The group's success to date from the Out of Control release had created landmark achievements and new opportunity's for the band. Following the success of Out of Control in late December 2009 Tin Alley received notice that Luke Chable was offering to create a special dance version of the band's rock track.

In the weeks to follow Tin Alley accepted and the track was later received and backed by commercial and community radio stations in Australia and also received spins on commercial stations in the UK and United States and received a Top Ten review in The Music Network. Lead singer Jim Siourthas later went on to mention in an interview on Nova 96.9 he was not to happy at first listen with Luke's vocal effects on his voice however he was still very pleased to have Luke collaborate with Tin Alley and liked the dance version.

Tin Alley were fortunate enough to showcase on the Friday night at the Melbourne Moomba Festival before bad weather and storms hit the Melbourne districts the following days resulting in headlining act Vanessa Amorosi and other performances being canceled on the Saturday and Sunday.

== Band name ==
Tin Alley's original logo.

The name Tin Alley was taken from the name of a laneway at Melbourne University where the brothers studied and regarding how they chose their name, Jim Siourthas states: "The name is something we thought about for a long time, and we wanted it to be something that we can relate to and the name Tin Alley was always on the books but Everything seemed to be more punchy at the time," Jim has said.

== Musical style and influences ==
Compared with the other hard rock bands of the late 1990s, Tin Alley's style is noticeably less heavy and harkens back to the classic rock music of the 1970s. Tin Alley has cited many punk rock and classic rock bands as influences, including The Who, The Doors, and Ramones. Tin Alley's success to date has been attributed to its sound, which fuses "the riff-heavy stadium rock of the '70s with the grit and anger of '80s post-punk, without ever neglecting hooks and choruses".

By early 2006 the band began to incorporate more funk influences into its music. The band's 2007 album Everyturn was a deliberate break from the musical style of Tin Alley's earlier sound.

The songs on the album featured elements of garage rock, worldbeat, and experimentalism which was somewhat of a return to the straight forward rock approach of the band's early work in Everything, when the band dabbled with experimental art rock and folk rock elements on 2001's "NYC". Some of the band's tracks on the 2007 album Everyturn was cited as a return to the band's early sound. The band's upcoming album, Crossing Paths, contains elements of pop and new wave.

Tin Alley's lyrical topics range from personal to social and political concerns ("Looking Up", "Get By" and "In Your Hands"). The band's lyrics have often invoked the use of storytelling and have included themes of freedom, individualism, and sympathy for troubled individuals.

The dynamic began to change when Paul went from guitar to bass and during the Everything era. Siourthas said in 2007, "Even though there is now only one guitar, I think there's maybe more room now, Peter will pull back and play a solid beat and Jim will do a power chord thing, and I fit into all that."

== Discography ==
=== Albums ===
- Everyturn (2007)

=== EPs ===
- Crossing Paths (2010)
- The Ghost EP (2014)

=== Charted singles ===
List of singles, with selected chart positions
Title	Year	Peak chart positions
Title	Year	AUS
"Out of Control"	2009	43

== See also ==
- Music of Australia

== Sources ==
- Rave Magazine
- MGM Distribution
- ARIA
- National Library of Australia
- PBS
- The Music
- Faster Louder
- Channel 31
- Triple J
- rage
- Oz Music Scene
- Neos Kosmos
- Girl
- Australian Music Office
- AIR Charts
- Christie Jayaratnam Eliezer
- Access All Areas
- ARIA Charts
- Aus Pop
- Facebook
