= Sébastien Nasra =

Founder of M for Montreal

Sébastien Nasra is the founder and president of music festivals and conferences M for Montréal and Mundial Montréal.

== Career ==
Nasra is a former musician, who also studied law. In 1994, when he was 23, he foundedAvalanche Productions, a multi-service agency that launched the careers of The Soul Attorneys, Jorane, Taima, Elisapie, Beast, Thus Owls, and Avalanche Sound Publishing.

In 2006, with the help of his friend and mentor Martin Elbourne (Glastonbury, The Great Escape), Nasra founded a new festival, conference and export platform that he named M for Montréal. The festival platformed numerous artists, including Patrick Watson, We are Wolves, Duchess Says, Of Monsters and Men, Besnard Lakes, Plants & Animals, The Barr Brothers, Blue Hawaii, Half Moon Run, Mac DeMarco.

In 2011, Nasra and his friend Derek Andrews, a Canadian programmer, adapted M for Montreal's formula to create a world music festival, Mundial Montréal. It is the only event of this kind in North America.

Nasra has served on the board of directors of organizations like the SOCAN, the APEM/PMPA (Quebec Professional Music Publishers Association) and ADISQ (Quebec's Professional Independent Music Industry & Trade Association). He was also mandated by the government to develop their initiative, Planète Québec.
