= The Mill, Adelaide =

Multidisciplinary arts organisation in Adelaide, Australia

The Mill is an multidisciplinary arts organisation and venue in Adelaide, South Australia, focused on independent artists. Founded in 2013 by Amber Cronin and Erin Fowler, The Mill provides studio space and a small theatre, and runs a range of programs to support creative artists.

== History ==
The Mill was founded in 2013 by visual artist Amber Cronin and performance artist Erin Fowler. Cronin became artistic director of The Mill.

In 2016, The Mill expanded, partnering with international organisations, including Sweden's ilDance; Rumah Sanur in Indonesia; and German cross-platform label Average Negative.

In 2018 the co-founders handed The Mill over to a new leadership team, led by performer and choreographer Katrina Lazaroff as director, with Tim Watts as general manager. In 2020 the director role evolved into CEO and artistic director.

Under Lazaroff, the focus started expanding from an emerging artists to a more general and holistic aim to support the careers of artists in Adelaide and South Australia, including those in mid-career.

The centre grew from 39 to 57 studios in 2022–2023. In 2023, after St Paul's Creative Centre closed, The Mill acquired some of their furnishings. In 2023 The Mill extended the lease on its Angas Street premises for a further three years, but were hoping to find another CBD venue capable of housing a larger theatre, rehearsal space, studios, a tools workshop, and an expanded gallery. On 16 June 2023 it celebrated its 10th anniversary with an event held at the premises.

In 2025, The Mill was able to expand into an empty warehouse loft behind its Angas Street home, adding 15 new workspaces (a total of 70 studios) and becoming the largest creative studio precinct in South Australia.

== Description ==
The Mill is a multidisciplinary arts centre and organisation located at 154 Angas Street in Adelaide city centre. As of September 2025 it is headed by CEO Katrina Lazaroff, with Tim Watts as general manager. It is governed by a board, headed by chair Ana Koch.

Its mission statement is to be "the sum of all arts". The Mill supports many types of local artists and creatives, firstly by providing studios to work in, and secondly by offering a range of programs to support artists and creators, such as masterclasses and workshops that assist with exploration of their practice as well as developing relationships in their industries.

As of 2023 the venue has a 50-seat theatre, which size suits the independent sector. It is used by the Adelaide Fringe for live performance, among other uses.

The Mill has forged connections with interstate organisations, including (as of 2023 Dancehouse in Melbourne and Brand X in Sydney, (Note: Brand X is a similar organisation in Sydney.) and co-runs an emerging producer program in conjunction with Metro Arts in Brisbane.

The Mill is funded by the Government of South Australia via CreateSA; the City of Adelaide; the Australian Government via Creative Australia; and the Adelaide Fringe Artist Fund, along with a number of corporate and private sponsors. In 2025, CreateSA is supporting a First-Nations-led dance program.

== Recognition ==
In 2023, The Mill won the Ruby Award for Outstanding Contribution by an Organisation or Group.

== Exhibitors and performers ==
Artists who have had residencies, performed, worked, or exhibited at The Mill include:

- Drag artist and dancer Kween Kong (who was an artist-in-residence)
- Sydney dancer and choreographer Kate Champion (an artist-in-residence, as part of the Choreographic Futures program)
- Photographer Che Chorley
- Visual artist Ida Sophia (winner of the Ramsay Award in 2023)
- Jewellery maker Naomi Murrell
- Tattoo artist Jaya Suartika
- Shoemaker Beccy Bromilow
- Audio engineer Emily Bettison
- Multi-disciplinary artist Dave Court
- Photographer Bri Hammond (artist-in-residence, March 2025)
- Visual artist Lucky Smith
- Furniture maker Peter Owen
- Visual artist Dai Trang Nguyen
- Theatre-maker and puppeteer, Sulochana Dissanayake; founder of touring Sri Lankan puppetry company, Power of Play
