= David Day (broadcaster) =

Australian radio broadcaster (1951–2015)

- Born: 1951; New South Wales, Australia
- Died: 1 May 2015 (aged 63–64); Adelaide, South Australia
- Other name: Daisy Day
- Occupation: Radio broadcaster
- Years active: 1960s–2015

David "Daisy" Day (1951 – 1 May 2015) was an Australian radio broadcaster. He is known for his work in Adelaide, South Australia and for founding the South Australian Music Hall of Fame.

== Biography ==
Day began his disc jockey career at 16 in Moree, New South Wales, before moving to Adelaide in 1973 to work firstly at 5KA, then SAFM and, in 1995, Triple M.

In 2013, Day published his autobiography Rock Jock.

Day died on 1 May 2015, aged 63.

== AMC and the SA Music Hall of Fame ==
Day was responsible for founding the South Australian Music Hall of Fame at the Goodwood Institute in the inner-south Adelaide suburb of Unley, after his friend and colleague, John Vincent, with whom he had discussed the idea, had died in 2009. The SA Music Hall of Fame inducts South Australian, musicians deserving of the recognition, including big names such as Cold Chisel and Masters Apprentices as well lesser known local musicians.

Gary Burrows of the Australasian Performing Right Association (APRA) introduced Day to Enrico Morena, who established the Adelaide Music Collective (AMC), and the two collaborated to mount the AMC Sessions. AMC is a collective of Adelaide music industry professionals who cooperate and collaborate with the common aim of developing and promoting Adelaide as a musical hub.

In December 2015, the SA Hall of Fame moved from the Goodwood Institute building to St Paul's Creative Centre in Pulteney Street in Adelaide city centre, which also hosts Music SA and various other music industry bodies. In October 2019, they expanded and moved into an annex in the centre.

The AMC was incorporated as the Adelaide Music Collective Incorporated in July 2016 and has traded as the AMC SA Music Hall of Fame since July 2017. After receiving criticism from the public and the press for mismanagement, self-promotion, and failing to hold appropriate AGM meetings and elections for the organisation, Enrico Morena also faced backlash for awarding his friends without due process. Additionally, he falsely promoted the organisation as a registered non-profit when it was not. As a result, Morena stepped down as chairman of the AMC SA Music Hall of Fame. Instead of properly transferring leadership, he de-registered the company on August 13, 2024. The organisation had to be saved and re-registered by David Day's widow, Annette Day, on August 20, 2024.
