= M for Montreal =

Music festival in Montreal, Canada

- Genre: Music festival
- Locations: Montreal, Quebec, Canada
- Years active: 2006–present
- Founders: Sébastien Nasra, Martin Elbourne
- Website: www.mformontreal.com

M for Montreal (M pour Montréal) is an annual 4-day music event produced by Avalanche Prod that is held in various venues in Montréal, Québec. It usually takes place on the third weekend of November.

== Description ==
M for Montreal is an independent organization whose stated mission is to help artists export their music outside Quebec and Canada. It was founded in 2006 by Sebastien Nasra and British festival programmer Martin Elbourne. The festival is divided into two parts: a conference, including panels and workshops, and a festival, which showcases around 100 bands annually. More than 200 international delegates attend M for Montreal.

Past notable acts include: Mac DeMarco, Grimes, Patrick Watson, Half Moon Run, Of Monsters and Men, Coeur de Pirate, Blue Hawaii, M83, The Stills, Pierre Lapointe, Foxtrott, A Tribe Called Red, and more.

== Events ==
M for Montreal also produces events at South by Southwest (SXSW), The Great Escape Festival, CMJ Music Marathon, Canadian Music Week (CMW), North by Northeast (NXNE), Iceland Airwaves and Festival Les Inrocks in Paris. Additionally, M programs events throughout the year in Montreal, partnering with organizations such as OUMF and Quartier des Spectacles. The festival has also worked with Planète Québec and Québec in Hollywood on events taking place in the United States.
