= Frank Counsell =

Australian architect

Francis Hedley Counsell FRAIA (14 May 1864 – 4 February 1933), always known as "Frank", was a South Australian architect known for pioneering use of reinforced concrete in the state.

== Early life and education ==
Frank was born at Somerton, South Australia the third son of James Counsell, partner in the firm of Whyte, Counsell & Co., merchants and shipowners. He was educated at Glenelg Grammar School and St Peter's College, Adelaide.

== Career ==
Counsell began working life as a clerk with the Bank of Adelaide, then joined the architectural firm of James Cumming, while studying at Adelaide's School of Design.

Around 1885 he left Adelaide for Melbourne, where after working as draughtsman for several firms, he gained employment with the Victorian Railways, and was responsible for the work on several country stations, notably Maryborough (of which Mark Twain wrote a humorous piece) and Ballarat.

He returned to Adelaide, where for a year or so he worked for Edward Davies and Cavanagh, then moved to Perth, Western Australia, where he gained more experience with railway stations, then returned to South Australia where his interstate experience gained him design work on the Adelaide railway station. In 1903 he left government service and started his own practice, then in 1926 became a partner with his previous employer as Davies Wooldridge and Counsell, with whom he was still working at the time of his death.

Notable works in Adelaide were an additional floor to the Advertiser building in 1907 (the first use of steel-reinforced concrete on the Hennebique principle in South Australia), the D. & J. Fowler "Lion" building on North Terrace (now the Lion Arts Centre) in 1905, the State Bank building and the Liberal Club building, also on North Terrace, in 1925.

He was a prolific writer of "Letters to the Editor" on a wide range of topics.

== Family ==
On 11 July 1900 Frank Counsell married Ellen Florence Moody of Maitland, South Australia. They had two daughters; (Ruth) Elma Counsell (25 July 1904 – ), who married H. J. Trevorrow, and Gwenneth H. "Gwen" Counsell (1906 – ). Their home was "Avarua" on Beach Road, Brighton.

== Source ==
- Collins, Susan Counsell, Frank Architects of South Australia website
