= Flight of the Ancients =

Studio album by The Shaolin Afronauts
- Released: 2011
- Genre: Afrobeat, Funk, Jazz
- Length: 45:30

The Shaolin Afronauts chronology
Flight of the Ancients (2011)	Quest under Capricorn (2012)

Flight of the Ancients is a 2011 album by The Shaolin Afronauts. It was nominated for several music awards, including the 25th ARIA Award in the world music category.

== Track listing ==
No.	Title	Length
1.	"Journey Through Time"	5:16
2.	"Rise with the Blind"	4:36
3.	"Flight of the Ancients"	5:47
4.	"Shaolin Theme"	4:38
5.	"Kilimanjaro"	6:27
6.	"Shira"	7:39
7.	"The Quiet Lion"	6:23
8.	"The Scarab"	4:55

== Personnel ==
Musicians and recording personnel:

- Alto Saxophone – Chris Soole
- Arranged By – Lachlan Ridge*, Ross McHenry
- Baritone Saxophone, Bass Clarinet – Jon Hunt (2)
- Bass – Ross McHenry
- Congas – Tim Wilsdon
- Design – Kano172
- Drums – Kevin van der Zwaag
- Guitar – Dylan Marshall, Kahil Nayton, Lachlan Ridge*
- Mastered By – Pete Maher (2)
- Mixed By – Tom Barnes (6)
- Percussion – Joel Prime, Tim Bennett (2)
- Producer – Ross McHenry
- Recorded By – Corey Hosking (tracks: B1, B3), Gabriel Agostino (tracks: B1, B3), Tom Barnes (6) (tracks: A1 to A4, B1, B4)
- Shekere, Percussion [Hand Percussion] – David van der Zwaag
- Tenor Saxophone – Adam Page
- Trumpet – Chris Weber (4)
- Written-By – Lachlan Ridge* (tracks: A4), Ross McHenry (tracks: A1 to A3, B1 to B4)
