= National Live Music Awards of 2016 =

Annual Australian music awards ceremony

- Date: 29 November 2016
- Venue: The Basement, Sydney, Australia

Highlights
- Most wins: Ngaiire (3)

The National Live Music Awards of 2016 are the inaugural National Live Music Awards. The event took place on 29 November 2016.

Award director, Larry Heath said: "Artists like Ngaiire are the beating heart of the contemporary live music scene in Australia and to be able to recognise her for that, alongside dozens of other winners around the country, is what these awards were designed for. I look forward to seeing the event evolve and develop in the years to come and continuing to spread our love for live music around the country, solidifying our place both locally and internationally one of the healthiest live music scenes in the world." The awards took place across 8 venues all around Australia, encompassing and representing every State and Territory, making the National Live Music Awards an industry first.

== National awards ==
Nominations and wins below.

Live Act of the Year

| Artist | Result |
|---|---|
| Gang of Youths | Nominated |
| King Gizzard and the Lizard Wizard | Nominated |
| Tame Impala | Nominated |
| The Smith Street Band | Won |
| Violent Soho | Nominated |

Live Voice of the Year

| Artist | Result |
|---|---|
| David Le'aupepe (Gang of Youths) | Nominated |
| Georgia Maq (Camp Cope) | Nominated |
| Montaigne | Nominated |
| Ngaiire | Won |
| Paul Dempsey | Nominated |

The Heatseeker Award

| Artist | Result |
|---|---|
| Alex Lahey | Nominated |
| Camp Cope | Won |
| Julia Jacklin | Nominated |
| Methyl Ethel | Nominated |
| Sampa The Great | Nominated |

- The Heatseeker Award recognises a rising star on the Australian live circuit, who have gone from unknown to selling out rooms around the country over the last 12 months.

Live Bassist of the Year

| Artist | Result |
|---|---|
| Donny Benét (Jack Ladder & The Dreamlanders) | Won |
| Jonathan Zwartz | Nominated |
| Kelly-Dawn Hellmrich (Camp Cope) | Nominated |
| Ross McHenry (Shaolin Afronauts) | Nominated |
| Tom Tilley (Client Liaison) | Nominated |

Live Drummer of the Year

| Artist | Result |
|---|---|
| Benjamin Masters (Tapestry) | Nominated |
| Laurence Pike (PVT) | Nominated |
| Paris Jeffree (The Avalanches, Colorstarr) | Nominated |
| Simon Ridley (DZ Deathrays) | Won |
| Steve Judd (Karnivool, The Veronicas) | Nominated |

Live Guitarist of the Year

| Artist | Result |
|---|---|
| Gareth Liddiard | Won |
| Gideon Bensen | Nominated |
| Harts | Nominated |
| Kirin J. Callinan | Nominated |
| Oscar Dawson | Nominated |

Live Instrumentalist of the Year

| Artist | Result |
|---|---|
| Happy Axe (Emma Kelly) | Nominated |
| Johann Beardraven (The Beards) | Won |
| Lachy Doley | Nominated |
| Sophie Hutchings | Nominated |
| Tara John (Joni In The Moon) | Nominated |

Live Electronic Act (or DJ) of the Year

| Artist | Result |
|---|---|
| Alison Wonderland | Nominated |
| Flume | Won |
| Rüfüs Du Sol | Nominated |
| Safia | Nominated |
| Slumberjack | Nominated |

Live Hard Rock Act of the Year

| Artist | Result |
|---|---|
| DZ Deathrays | Nominated |
| High Tension | Nominated |
| Northlane | Nominated |
| Totally Unicorn | Nominated |
| Violent Soho | Won |

Live Hip Hop Act of the Year

| Artist | Result |
|---|---|
| A.B. Original | Nominated |
| L-FRESH the Lion | Nominated |
| Remi | Nominated |
| Sampa The Great | Nominated |
| Tkay Maidza | Won |

Live R&B or Soul Act of the Year

| Artist | Result |
|---|---|
| Hiatus Kaiyote | Nominated |
| Mojo Juju | Nominated |
| Ngaiire | Won |
| Odette Mercy & Her Soul Atomics | Nominated |
| Sampa The Great | Nominated |

Live Roots Act of the Year

| Artist | Result |
|---|---|
| All Our Exes Live in Texas | Nominated |
| Kim Churchill | Nominated |
| Ruby Boots | Nominated |
| Tash Sultana | Won |
| The Pierce Brothers | Nominated |

Best Live Music Festival or Event

| Festival or Event | Result |
|---|---|
| Bluesfest, Byron Bay | Nominated |
| Dark Mofo, Tasmania | Won |
| Falls Music & Arts Festival | Nominated |
| St Jerome's Laneway Festival | Nominated |
| Splendour in the Grass | Nominated |

International Live Achievement (Group)

| Group | Result |
|---|---|
| Boy & Bear | Nominated |
| Holy Holy | Nominated |
| King Gizzard and the Lizard Wizard | Nominated |
| Rüfüs Du Sol | Nominated |
| Tame Impala | Won |

International Live Achievement (Solo)

| Group | Result |
|---|---|
| Courtney Barnett | Won |
| Meg Mac | Nominated |
| Tkay Maidza | Nominated |
| Troye Sivan | Nominated |
| Vance Joy | Nominated |

Industry Achievement

| Group | Result |
|---|---|
| Danny Rogers (Laneway Festival / Lunatic Entertainment) | Nominated |
| Evelyn Morris (LISTEN) | Nominated |
| Damian Cunningham & John Wardle (Live Music Office) | Nominated |
| Sounds Australia | Won |
| Jaddan Comerford (UNIFIED) | Nominated |

== State and Territory awards ==
- Note: Wins only.

ACT Awards
| Award | Winner |
|---|---|
| Live Act of the Year | Glitoris |
| Live Voice of the Year | Citizen Kay |
| Live Venue of the Year | The Phoenix |
| Live Event of the Year | Groovin' The Moo |

Northern Territory Awards
| Award | Winner |
|---|---|
| Live Act of the Year | Apakatjah & Tapestry |
| Live Voice of the Year | Colin Lillie |
| Live Venue of the Year | Epilogue Rooftop |
| Live Event of the Year | Wide Open Space Festival |

- NT Live Act of the Year was a tie.

NSW Awards
| Award | Winner |
|---|---|
| Live Act of the Year | Gang of Youths |
| Live Voice of the Year | Ngaiire |
| Live Venue of the Year | Newtown Social Club |
| Live Event of the Year | King Street Crawl |
| All Ages Achievement | Black Wire Records |

Queensland Awards
| Award | Winner |
|---|---|
| Live Act of the Year | Violent Soho |
| Live Voice of the Year | MKO |
| Live Venue of the Year | The Triffid |
| Live Event of the Year | BIGSOUND |

South Australian Awards
| Award | Winner |
|---|---|
| Live Act of the Year | Bad//Dreems |
| Live Voice of the Year | Naomi Keyte |
| Live Venue of the Year | The Grace Emily Hotel |
| Live Event of the Year | WOMADelaide |

Tasmanian Awards
| Award | Winner |
|---|---|
| Live Act of the Year | Luca Brasi |
| Live Voice of the Year | Jed Appleton |
| Live Venue of the Year | The Republic Bar |
| Live Event of the Year | Dark Mofo |

Victorian Awards
| Award | Winner |
|---|---|
| Live Act of the Year | King Gizzard and the Lizard Wizard |
| Live Voice of the Year | Paul Dempsey |
| Live Venue of the Year | The Corner Hotel, Richmond |
| Live Event of the Year | St. Jerome's Laneway Festival |

West Australian Awards
| Award | Winner |
|---|---|
| Live Act of the Year | Methyl Ethel |
| Live Voice of the Year | Keira Owen |
| Live Venue of the Year | Mojos |
| Live Event of the Year | St Jerome's Laneway Festival |
