= Shaolin Afronauts =

The Shaolin Afronauts
- Origin: Australia
- Genres: Afrobeat, Funk, Jazz
- Years active: 2008–present
- Labels: Freestyle, Meccca
- Spinoff of: The Transatlantics
- Members: Ross McHenry, Kevin Van Der Zwaag, Lachlan Ridge, Andrew Crago, Luca Spiler, Adam Page, John Hunt, Chris Weber, Dylan Marshall, Jarrad Payne

The Shaolin Afronauts are an Afrobeat band based in Adelaide, Australia. Their music is heavily influenced by West African Afrobeat artists such as Fela Kuti, but also incorporates elements of avant-garde jazz, soul and other traditional African and Cuban percussive rhythms. They describe their music as "interstellar futurist afro-soul".

== Career ==
=== 2008–2010: Origins and style ===
Founded in 2008 out of a fascination with Afrobeat and creative improvised music, seven out of the ten band members were also members of The Transatlantics, who met at the University of Adelaide. The Transatlantics favoured many different styles of music, especially that of West and East Africa, but the breakaway group wanted to create something a bit looser and more interpretative, less arranged. The group started out as a side project, but found it worked well together from the start. Bassist Ross McHenry says that he was inspired by the Afrobeat music he heard at WOMADelaide as a child, and he likes to write and play music infused with soul and guided by intuition.

The musicians particularly styled their music after the Afrobeat style of Fela Kuti and his Africa '70 band and other West African music. A lesser but important influence was the 1970s avant-garde jazz movement, especially artists like Sun Ra and Pharoah Sanders. Their sound also incorporates soul and traditional African and Cuban percussive rhythms.

As of May 2020, the Shaolin Afronauts' Facebook page describes their music as "interstellar futurist afro-soul".

=== 2011–present: album releases ===
In 2011, they played at WOMADelaide. The song "Kilimanjaro" was the first release by the band. Later in 2011, they were signed to Freestyle records and saw the release of their debut album, Flight of the Ancients. The album was featured on Radio National Breakfast and garnered considerable attention on community radio, streetpress and Triple J.

In January 2012 the band recorded their second album, Quest under Capricorn, with an expanded ensemble of 18 musicians.

In September 2014, the band released their third album, Follow the Path. Also in 2014, the band played at Glastonbury. They continued to play regular gigs around Adelaide and occasional gigs and festivals elsewhere, including the two-day Blenheim Music and Camping Festival in the Clare Valley, north of Adelaide, in 2015.

In October 2016, Shaolin Afronauts played the Kennedys Creek Music Festival in Victoria. The three-day festival was held from 21 to 23 October 2016 at the Kennedys Creek Public Hall grounds and featured the band among its lineup of Australian performers.

In July 2017 the group reprised their Quest under Capricorn performance at The Gov as part of the Umbrella: Winter City Sounds festival and played with their usual complement at Here's to Now at Coriole Vineyards in December of the same year.

As part of the Adelaide Festival in March 2020, the Afronauts performed a show called "Mad Max Meets The Shaolin Afronauts", where the classic dystopian thriller, the first Mad Max film, was played with subtitles, with accompanying score played live by the band. They played 10 songs, starting with "Kilimanjaro" and finishing with "Baie de Sangareya".

== Discography ==
=== Albums ===
Title	Details
Flight of the Ancients	Released: 24 June 2011; Label: Freestyle Records; Format: 1×CD (FSRCD085), 1×LP (FSRLP085), digital download
Quest Under Capricorn	Released: 13 July 2012; Label: Freestyle Records; Format: 1×CD (FSRCD095), 1×LP (FSRLP095), digital download
Follow the Path	Released: 5 September 2014; Label: Freestyle Records; Format: 2×CD (FSRCD106), 1×CD (PCD24347), 2×LP (FSRLP106), digital download
The Fundamental Nature of Being	Released: 16 September 2022; Label: Freestyle Records; Format: 5×LP box (FSRLP140BOX), 5×LP (FSRLP135, FSRLP136, FSRLP137, FSRLP138, FSRLP139), 5×CD (FSRCD135, FSRCD136, FSRCD137, FSRCD138, FSRCD139), digital download

== Awards and nominations ==
=== ARIA Music Awards ===
The ARIA Music Awards is an annual awards ceremony that recognises excellence, innovation, and achievement across all genres of Australian music. They commenced in 1987.

Year	Nominee / work	Award	Result	Ref.
2011	Flight of the Ancients	Best World Music Album	Nominated	

=== Fowler's Live Music Awards ===
The Fowler's Live Music Awards took place from 2012 to 2014 to "recognise success and achievement over the past 12 months [and] celebrate the great diversity of original live music" in South Australia. Since 2015 they're known as the South Australian Music Awards.

Year	Nominee / work	Award	Result (wins only)
2012	Shaolin Afronauts	Best New World Artist	Won
2014	Shaolin Afronauts	Best New World Artist	Won

=== National Live Music Awards ===
The National Live Music Awards (NLMAs) commenced in 2016 to recognise contributions to the live music industry in Australia.

Year	Nominee / work	Award	Result	Ref.
2016	Ross McHenry (Shaolin Afronauts)	Live Bassist of the Year	Nominated	
2023	Shaolin Afronauts	Best Jazz Act	Nominated	

== Band members ==
=== Current ===
Members as listed on their Facebook page as of May 2020:

- Ross McHenry - Bass guitar and leader
- Kevin van der Zwaag - Drums
- Jarrad Payne - Percussion
- Dylan Marshall - Guitar
- Lachlan Ridge - Guitar
- Adam Page - Woodwind
- Jason McMahon - Woodwind
- Chris Weber - Trumpet
- Jon Hunt - Woodwind
- Tim Bennett - Percussion
- Django Rowe - Guitar
- Brenton Foster - Keyboards

=== Past credits ===
On Flight of the Ancients (2011):

- Kevin van der Zwaag, drums
- Lachlan Ridge, guitar
- Kahil Nayton, guitar
- Dylan Marshall, guitar
- Jon Hunt, baritone saxophone and bass clarinet
- Chris Soole, alto saxophone
- Chris Weber, trumpet
- Joel Prime, percussion
- Tim Bennett, percussion
- David van der Zwaag, shekere and hand percussion
- Tim Wilsdon, congas
- Ross McHenry, bass and leader

Collaborators on Quest under Capricorn (2012):

- Derek Pascoe - Tenor saxophone
- Andrew Crago - Saxophones
- Max Franklin - Saxophones
- David van der Zwaag - Percussion
- Joel Prime - Percussion
- Pat Thiele
- Sam Eads
- Kyra Schwartz
- Luca Spiler - Trombone, Bass trombone

At Blenheim Festival, March 2015:

- Ross McHenry - Bass guitar
- Kevin van der Zwaag - Drums
- Jarrad Payne - Percussion
- Dylan Marshall - Guitar, synthesiser
- Lachlan Ridge - Guitar
- Adam Page - Tenor saxophone, flute
- Jason McMahon - Baritone saxophone
- Tim Bennett - Percussion
- Chris Weber - Trumpet
- Stephen McEntee - Trombone

== Individual work ==
=== Ross McHenry ===
Ross McHenry released an album, Child of Somebody, in July 2016, which was recorded in New York and includes artists Marcus Strickland, Mark de Clive-Lowe, Tivon Pennicott, Duane Eubanks and Corey King. He also formed the Ross McHenry Trio, with New Zealand drummer Myele Manzanza and pianist Matthew Sheens, who played at the Melbourne International Jazz Festival in June 2016 and released an album, The Outsiders, to critical acclaim in 2017. McHenry and Tara Lynch, original Transatlantics vocalist, are married and have a daughter born around 2014.

The Fowler's Live Music Awards took place from 2012 to 2014 to "recognise success and achievement over the past 12 months [and] celebrate the great diversity of original live music" in South Australia. Since 2015 they are known as the South Australian Music Awards. In 2014, McHenry won Best Jazz Artist

The National Live Music Awards (NLMAs) are a broad recognition of Australia's diverse live industry, celebrating the success of the Australian live scene. The awards commenced in 2016. In 2016, Henry was nominated as Live Bassist of the Year.

=== Dylan Marshall / Didier Kumalo ===
Composer and guitarist Dylan Marshall hails from Cape Town, South Africa, where he was inspired by local pioneers of jazz such as Abdullah Ibrahim and Chris McGregor, as well as other African musicians, including Bembeya Jazz National, OK Jazz, and Super Biton de Ségou. His musical influences also include 80s electro-funk, 70s jazz-rock and hip hop music. In 2017, he formed a five-piece band called Didier Kumalo, which pays tribute to some of the classic African jazz ensembles, but influenced by contemporary musical techniques and styles, including electronic and acoustic. Didier Kumalo is scheduled to play at WOMADelaide in March 2023.

=== Adam Page ===
Adam Page is a multi-instrumentalist, composer, music educator, and record producer, who has collaborated with both local and international musicians and orchestras.

In 2025 he is collaborating with the Australian Dance Theatre on a work celebrating the company's 60th anniversary, called A Quiet Language.

Page has won the following awards:

- 2007: Best Music by an Emerging Artist - Adelaide Fringe
- 2009: Best Solo Show - New Zealand Fringe
- 2009: Best Music – New Zealand Fringe
- 2011: Best Music – Adelaide Fringe
- 2016: Best Jazz Artist - South Australian Music Awards - Co-winner, with Ben Todd
- 2016: Best Music – Melbourne Fringe
- 2017: Best Music - Adelaide Fringe
- 2017: Best World Music Artist - South Australian Music Awards
- 2018: Best Jazz Artist - South Australian Music Awards - Co-winner, with Ben Todd
- 2023: UNESCO City of Music Best International Collaboration - South Australian Music Awards
