= The Open Season =

Rock band from Australia

- Origin: Adelaide, Australia
- Genres: Rock, Pop, Alternative
- Years active: 2004–2008
- Labels: Pee Records
- Members: Stephen McGrath (Guitar, Lead Vocals); Jeremy Gryst (Guitar, Vocals); Damian Slattery (Bass); Travis Wright (Drums, Vocals)
- Past members: Sam Mehran; Ben Mann
- Website: Myspace

The Open Season were a four-piece alternative rock band from Adelaide, South Australia.

The Open Season formed in December 2004. The group is known for combining gutsy Aussie rock vocals and heavy melodic guitar riffs and have shared stages with bands such as New Found Glory, Lagwagon, Motion City Soundtrack, Behind Crimson Eyes, Matchbook Romance, The Audition, Parkway Drive, Mere Theory, After The Fall, Kisschasy, Gyroscope, In The Grey, Forgetting Yesterday, Angela's Dish, Straylight Run, Stolen Youth, Sunset Avenue, Something With Numbers, Trial Kennedy, Horsell Common, The Hot Lies, and The Getaway Plan. The Open Season toured nationally numerous times.

In 2005, only days after releasing their demos online, the band signed with label Pee Records and released an EP, Chase. The EP debuted at no 1 on the SA Real Music Charts (AWESAM) and sold out of its first pressing within a few weeks. Tracks from Chase and Before We Start have received airplay on Nova FM and Australian national youth radio station Triple J, including being voted by the Australian public as one of the Top 40 charted releases of 2005 on Stuart Harvey's Short Fast Loud on Triple J.

Local dB magazine said in regards to a live show they played; "Pleasant surprise number one: Adelaide's own The Open Season. Despite the fact that I love their debut CD-EP 'The Chase', I'd only managed to check the guys out live once before, and a horrible mix at Fowler's left me disappointed with their live show. Tonight, however, with a crisp mix blasting out of the Uni Bar front of house, The Open Season proved themselves impressively tight and entertainingly energetic. This band is ace; if you like a bit of emo and you aren't into local music yet, buy 'Chase' and get down to an Open Season show. Now. "

BLUNT magazine noted "The Open Season really seem to know what they're doing, and what they're doing is leading a substantial change."

In an interview with dB magazine, The Open Season talked of how the band formed "I was surprised at their youth, given their accomplished and solid sound. I'd assumed they'd have been older, or at least had some sort of serious Adelaide band credentials. "Well, nothing really that established,' McGrath shrugs when I ask whether they'd been in previous groups. "We're only, like, 21, but with Damo [Slattery], the bass player, we had been in a pop-punk band called Too Many Malcolms. Then we started a band called Open Season, but that fell through and we just recycled the name. And Travis [Wright, drums] and Jeremy [Gryst, guitar] had been in a few things, but I don't know if they'd actually played shows. We just started out a three-piece - I'd met Trav probably a year before we started jamming properly - and we tried to get a few songs together and then decided we should get a second guitar player, so Jez came in."

The band released a second EP, Before We Start on 13 June 2007 on Pee Records.

With the release of Before We Start, the band gained some international presence. DIE SHELLSUIT, DIE! Magazine, UK noted "The "sound" to The Open Season is a big honking major label style slickness....."Blinded By Tradition" could break the UK Top 40 if it had the right backing. It's that certain amount of mass appeal mixed with an underground edge to it that could make it a winner".

The Open Season played their last official show on Friday 29 February 2008 at Fowlers Live in Adelaide.

In March 2010, The Open Season reemerged to play a one-off sold-out reunion show at Enigma Bar in Adelaide.

== Discography ==
=== Albums/EPs ===
- Chase — Pee Records (PCD007) (2005)
- Before We Start — Pee Records (PCD018) (13 June 2007)

=== Demos ===
- Demo — Pee Records (2004)
