= Thinker in Residence =

South Australian government program

Thinkers in Residence is a program in Adelaide, South Australia, designed to bring leaders in their fields to work with the South Australian community and government in developing new ideas and approaches to problem-solving, and to promote South Australia. Initiated by the state government in 2000 as Adelaide Thinkers in Residence and a global first, it was run by the South Australian government from 2003 to 2012, when funding ceased.

In 2013 by the Don Dunstan Foundation hosted Thinker Martin Elbourne to help revitalise the local music industry. After an hiatus for three years and a formal transition to the Foundation in 2016, the annual program restarted under the Foundation, with a slight change in focus and enabling multiple Thinkers to focus on one issue each year. A new model introduced in 2017 focussed on social capital, while also addressing job creation. It was known as the Social Capital Residencies program from 2017 to 2018.

== History ==
The concept of the Thinkers in Residence program was announced by the Hon Mike Rann, South Australian Opposition Leader, in November 2000. It was inspired by Greg Mackie's Adelaide Festival of Ideas. Invited guests would spend three months in Adelaide, assisting the government and community in tackling problems and exploring opportunities for the state. Rann, after his election as Premier in 2002, funded the Thinkers program, which ran from 2003 for nine years.

The program was intended to bring leaders in various fields to work with the South Australian community and government in developing new ideas and approaches to problem-solving, and to promote South Australia.

In 2012 Rann’s successor, Premier Jay Weatherill, discontinued the Thinkers program as a budget-saving measure.

In 2013 the Don Dunstan Foundation hosted the first residency outside of government, in that year with a particular focus on South Australia's live music industry. The residency of Martin Elbourne was very successful, leading to the establishment of St Paul's Creative Centre and the Music Development Office, along with the designation of Adelaide as a UNESCO City of Music.

The Thinkers in Residence program formally transitioned in 2016 to the Don Dunstan Foundation, with a slight change in focus and enabling multiple Thinkers to focus on one issue each year. Three Thinkers were hosted under the "Social Capital Residencies program" in 2017–8, when the new model focussed on social capital, while also addressing job creation. and as of 2019 is still running.

== Contributions ==
Established as a global first in 2003, it was a social innovation developed in South Australia to address challenges and explore opportunities, through the development of new policies and reform of systems.

The program resulted in more than A$200 million of investment in new programs and infrastructure from 2003 to 2013, in South Australia and across the country, with the federal government providing about half of this. Overall, it has helped guide the state government's response to many important issues, including health, education, water, climate change, manufacturing, transport and road safety.

In 2011 a representative of the Adelaide City Council wrote a testimonial letter to the Thinkers in Residence program highlighting the program's "positive influence in the development of strategies and policies for enhancing the City."

- As a result of the work of Thinker Baroness Professor Susan Greenfield, the Royal Institution of Australia and the Australian Science Media Centre were established in Adelaide.
- Thinkers Professor Stephen Schneider and Herbert Girardet assisted the SA government in developing its renewable energy and climate change policies, which have led to South Australia having 31% of its electricity coming from wind and solar power.
- Rosanne Haggerty, from New York, advised the government on how better to tackle rough sleeping homelessness. Her "Common Ground" program involved the multimillion-dollar construction of specialist inner-city apartments in Adelaide. Common Ground has now been adopted in other states.
- Fred Hansen, a Thinker in Residence from Portland, Oregon, convinced the government to invest in expanding its tram network. He also advised the government to make strategic, rather than reactive, investments in infrastructure. Mr Hansen is now the head of Adelaide’s Urban Renewal Authority, overseeing the $1 billion Bowden Village development and other projects.
- Professor Laura Lee, former Head of Architecture at Carnegie Mellon University, proposed the establishment of an Integrated Design Commission to encourage a better and more cohesive design culture in Adelaide.
- Professor Göran Roos, from the UK, advised the South Australian and Federal governments on advanced manufacturing strategies.
- Canada’s Fraser Mustard and Italy’s Carla Rinaldi advised the SA government on reforms to early childhood education, including state-wide measurement of progress in children’s development through the Australian Early Development Index.
- Geoff Mulgan's contribution led to the establishment of the Australian Centre for Social Innovation
- The Wellbeing and Resilience Centre (Martin Seligman)
- As a result of Martin Elbourne's 2013 report, the Music Development Office and adjunct St Paul's Creative Centre was created by the state government (then under Arts SA, now Dept of Innovation & Skills) in 2014, with the goal of "build[ing] pathways into creative and industry development, with city vibrancy and economic benefit being the ultimate outcomes", which it does by facilitating grants, fellowships and other means of developing the careers of contemporary musicians. A new independent body called Musitec, and an advisory body known as the Music Industry Council were also established.

== Thinkers and their reports ==
Thinkers and their reports are listed below.

- Allyson Hewitt (2017 & 2019)
- Ilse Treurnicht (2018 & 2019) – advising on Lot Fourteen redevelopment
- Nonie Brennan (2019)
- Martin Elbourne (2013) – The future of live music in South Australia (2013)
- Carla Rinaldi (2012–2013) – Re-imagining Childhood
- Martin Seligman (2012–2013) – The State of Wellbeing
- Alexandre Kalache (2011–2) – The Longevity Revolution
- John McTernan (2011)- Are you being served?
- Göran Roos (2011) – Manufacturing into the future
- Fred Wegman (2010) – Driving down the road toll by building a Safe System
- Fred Hansen (2009–2010) – All on board: Building vibrant communities through transport
- Peggy Hora (2009–2010) – Smart Justice: Building Safer Communities, Increasing Access to the Courts, and Elevating Trust and Confidence in the Justice System.
- Laura Lee (2009–2010)
- Genevieve Bell (2008–9) – Getting Connected, Staying Connected: Exploring South Australia's Digital Futures
- Andrew Fearne (2008) – Sustainable Food and Wine Value Chains
- Geoff Mulgan (2007–8)- Innovation in 360 Degrees: Promoting Social Innovation in South Australia
- Ilona Kickbusch (2007) – Healthy Societies: Addressing 21st Century Health Challenges
- Dennis Jaffe (2007) – The Future of Family Business in South Australia
- Fraser Mustard (2006–7) – Investing in the Early Years: Closing the gap between what we know and what we do
- Stephen Schneider (2006) – Climate Change: Risks and Opportunities
- Rosanne Haggerty (2005–6) – Smart Moves: Spending to Saving, Streets to Home
- Susan Greenfield (2004–5) – Getting the Future First
- Peter Wintonick (2005) – Southern Screens : Southern Stories Building a New Screen Culture in South Australia
- Maire Smith (2003–4) – Developing a Bioeconomy in South Australia
- Peter Cullen (2004) – Water challenges for South Australia in the 21st Century
- Blast Theory (2003–4) – New media, art and a creative culture
- Charles Landry (2003) – Rethinking Adelaide: ‘capturing imagination’
- Herbert Girardet (2003) – Creating a Sustainable Adelaide
