= MusicSA =

South Australian non-profit organisation that promotes local music

MusicSA, originally AusMusic SA, is a non-profit organisation whose aims are to promote, support and develop contemporary music in South Australia. It was formerly legally registered as South Australian Contemporary Music Company Ltd. It presents the annual South Australian Music Awards, puts on the two-week celebration of live music, Umbrella: Winter City Sounds, and organises a number of other musical events throughout the year. It also provides training, professional development advice, and live performance opportunities for musicians.

== History ==
AusMusic SA was established on 23 July 1997 as the South Australian Contemporary Music Development Company, trading as AusMusic SA. In 2004, Music SA Online was established, and in 2005 the organisation started the Contemporary Music Program in 29 secondary schools. From 2007 to 2010, it ran the Louder Than Words Festival in regional SA, and from 2008 to 2012 the Coopers Alive Festival. It also managed the Fuse Festival.

In 2010, MusicSA became a registered training organisation, and in the same year AusmusicSA was re-branded as MusicSA. The organisation engaged in several collaborations with other partners, such as Flinders University, the Australian Independent Record Labels Association (AIR) Awards, and local radio stations, and has also published several guides relevant to the contemporary music industry.

In 2015 Lisa Bishop (who is also deputy chair of Adelaide Fringe and a film producer), became CEO/general manager of MusicSA.

In 2015 MusicSA took over responsibility for the Fowlers Live Music Awards, renamed the South Australian Music Awards (or SA Music Awards).

Umbrella: Winter City Sounds, a two-week live music festival, was launched in 2016, which in 2017 put on 300 events, funded by the Australia Council and the South Australian Tourism Commission and has been an annual event, until the cancellation in 2020 owing to the COVID-19 pandemic. It was scheduled to run from mid-July in 2021, but 80 live music events in the first week had to be cancelled owing to a 7-day lockdown across the state.

In 2017 MusicSA launched the Girls to the Front music education program for teenage girls. Owing to complicated funding rules introduced during the COVID-19 pandemic, MusicSA did not spend its entire budget provision for the 2022–23 financial year. With audiences not back to their pre-pandemic levels, the organisation feared that around A$6m of spending allocated for the live music sector had been taken back by the government.

The organisation was rebranded from Music SA to MusicSA in 2022, per the 2021 and 2022 annual reports.

== Description and governance ==
MusicSA's focus has broadened since its inception, from an organisation with a focus on music courses in schools to a nationally recognised industry body which "educates,...advocates, promotes, mentors, supports and markets artists and industry personnel and focusses on building a thriving contemporary music community in SA".

From sometime before 2007 until 2015, MusicSA was located on Level 1 of the Lion Arts Centre, with the address given as "Fowlers Building" for some of that time.

From 2015 it was situated in St Paul's Creative Centre in Pulteney Street, Adelaide city centre. As of April 2025, it occupies premises at Shop 4 in Cinema Place, off Rundle Street in the city.

Christine Schloithe was appointed CEO in May 2022, and is still in the position as of April 2025. As of April 2025 John Glenn chairs the board, which comprises five directors.

== Activities ==
MusicSA's activities are aimed at benefiting the music industry in South Australia. To that end, it manages an informative SA music website; runs contemporary music workshops and training programs in schools; provides professional development services for artists and practitioners; runs music business events and seminars; provides opportunities for live performances; runs an accredited music business training program; runs Vocational Education Training (VET) programs for secondary schools; and since 2015 has been responsible for the SA Music Awards.

In collaboration with the Live Music Office, it creates the Live Music Census, which analyses the music supply chain in South Australia, including song-writing, retail, manufacturing, recording studios, dedicated music media, education, and live music gigs and festivals.

In addition to these, it puts on a number of events and programs: Umbrella: Winter City Sounds, a two-week festival; Adelaide Sounds, a live music series performed at Adelaide Airport every Friday afternoon and alternate Saturdays and Sundays since 2013; Bands On Track, a competition in which the winners get to play as support acts at the Superloop Adelaide 500 after-race concerts, and Clip It! music video competition. Umbrella: Winter City Sounds 2019 featured hundreds of acts in small venues across greater Adelaide.

In July 2017, Music SA created an event known as Scouted, an event run as part of Umbrella: Winter City Sounds and in conjunction with Australian Independent Record Labels Association (AIR), with the aim of giving a platform to some of South Australia's most prominent unsigned musical talents, spread across venues in Adelaide's East End. The first event featured electronic duo Electric Fields, Young Offenders, Bec Stevens, Alana Jagt, Timberwolf, Heaps Good Friends and others. The event helped to boost the participants' careers, and the 2018 event was held at around the same time as the AIR Awards and Indie-Con.

In the summer of 2018, Music SA and the City of Adelaide presented a series six of lunchtime and early evening concerts called "Rock The Square", to showcase up-and-coming music talent in Adelaide. Lunchtime and evening concerts in Victoria Square/Tarndanyangga featured newcomers Kashaguava, Camp Coyote, Naomi Keyte, Cowboys of Love, hot mess, Madura Green, Alana Jagt, and Corey Theatre Music.

In November 2023, MusicSA launched Good Music Month, with 2,000 artists participating in 650 live music events. The concerts put on as part of the Adelaide 500 car race fall within the month, which in 2024 include The Cruel Sea, Crowded House, Ocean Alley, Cold Chisel, Meg Mac, The Superjesus, Tonix, and J-Milla. The SA Music Awards were held at the Dom Polski Centre on 7 November, and included live shows by West Thebarton and other local acts, as well as Guy Sebastian. Notestock, a mini-festival launched by The Note in 2023, finished off the month, at UniBar on 29 November.

== South Australian Music Awards ==
Fowler's Live Music Awards started in 2012, and these were renamed the South Australian Music Awards (or SA Music Awards or SAM Awards) when custodianship was handed to Music SA in 2015.

== Funding ==
=== General funding ===
To implement its 2023–2025 strategic plan, MusicSA receives funding from the Government of South Australia through the Music Development Office (MDO), after several years of interrupted funding during the COVID-19 pandemic. It had previously received funding from the government through Arts South Australia and the Department of Innovation and Skills, and also received project funding from the City of Adelaide, the Australian Hotels Association (AHA, SA Branch), APRA/AMCOS, and the Live Music Events Fund. As of April 2025 it also receives funding from AHA, Aon Adelaide, and APRA/AMCOS.

In November 2018, after Minister for Industry and Skills David Pisoni had attended the 2018 SA Music Awards, the Government announced more than A$500,000 in funding to support the growth of live music in South Australia. Pisoni praised MusicSA for its work in raising the profile of the awards and the local music industry.

=== Funding for Indigenous musicians ===
In January 2019, Music SA announced the establishment of a new scholarship and internship plan for Aboriginal and Torres Strait Islander musicians, made possible by the support of an anonymous donor, whose contribution was matched by Music SA.

In April 2019, just before the election, the federal government announced its Australian Music Industry Package, which included A$22.5 million to provide small businesses with grants, capped at A$10,000 and spread over four years, to fund artist programming and improving infrastructure for live performances. With this package came a commitment to establishing a national development program to help Indigenous musicians and groups tour and record, with the program and funding to be administered by Music SA.
