= Crown & Anchor, Adelaide =

Pub in Adelaide, South Australia

Crown & Anchor
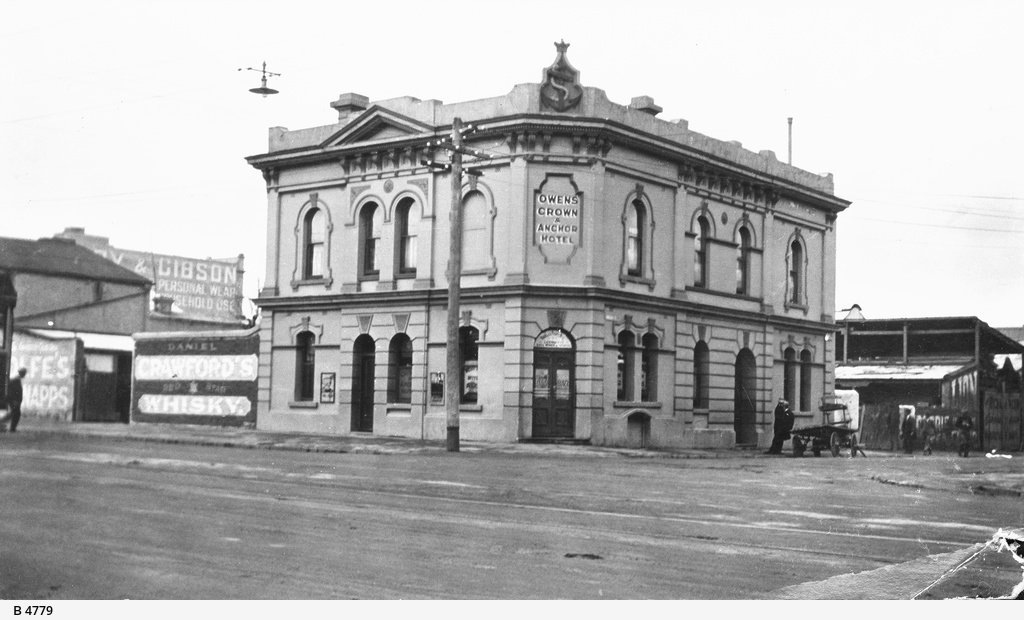
- c. 1928, before renovation

General information
- Architectural style: 1879 (current) building neoclassical, but 1929 alterations changed the facade significantly
- Location: 196-198 Grenfell Street
- Coordinates: 34°55′25″S 138°36′30″E
- Year built: Pub established in previous building 1853; rebuilt 1879
- Renovated: 1928–9
- Cost: £1,534

Technical details
- Floor count: 2

Design and construction
- Architect: Thomas English

Website
- www.crownandanchorhotel.com.au

The Crown & Anchor Hotel, affectionately known as The Cranker, is a pub in Grenfell Street, Adelaide, South Australia, known for its longstanding live music scene. The current building was designed by noted colonial architect, former mayor of Adelaide, and parliamentarian Thomas English and built in 1879, but it was extensively remodelled and extended in 1928 to designs by Milne, Evans, and Russell.

In 2024, the pub was threatened with demolition and redevelopment into a tall residential building, with only the facade remaining. However, after extensive protests and intervention by the Premier of South Australia, Peter Malinauskas, the building was saved, and further legislation passed to protect other live music venues in the Adelaide city centre.

== History ==
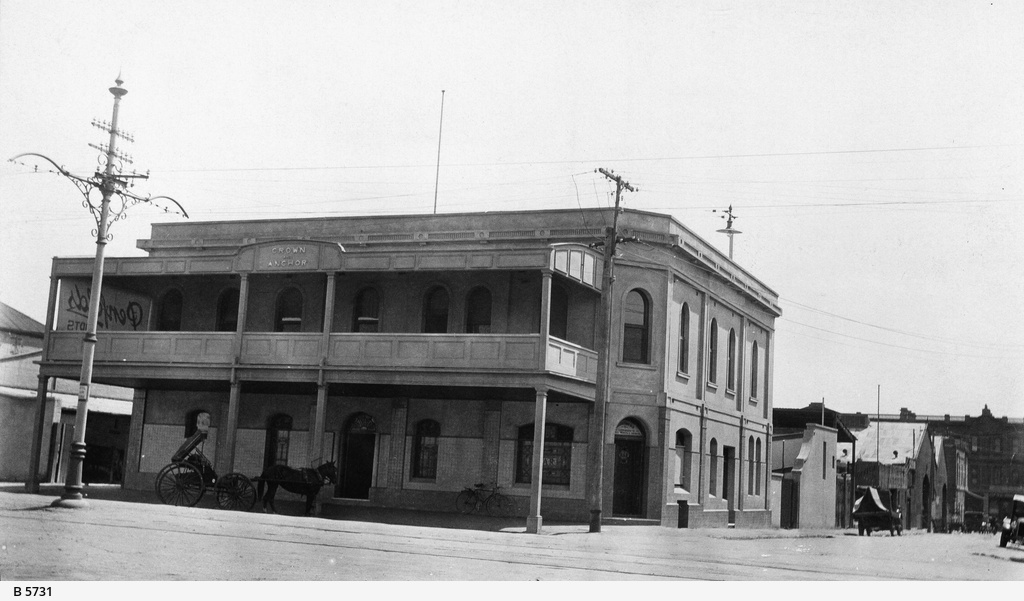
Crown & Anchor, 1930, after expansion and renovation

Not long after the establishment of the colony of South Australia and the city of Adelaide, in 1844 the Union Brewing & Malting Company began operations on Union Street, with the street being named after the brewery. It continued to operate until 1902. The Union Inn Arms Hotel (or just Union Inn) was built in 1847 on the site on the corner of Grenfell and Union Streets in Adelaide city centre, known as town acre 97.

A new building was built by 1853, when the Crown & Anchor Hotel was first licensed to sell alcohol. The hotel dug its own rock-lined well to use as a water source, and this is still in existence in the basement in May 2024, located in the north-east corner of the front bar, below the pool tables. On 28 March 1853 licensee James Ellery, who had for the previous six years hosted the Beresford Arms, announced his purchase of "Crown and Anchor, late the Union Inn, Grenfell-Street East", where "the extensive premises" would enable him to accommodate his old friends" and others, and that the premises included "good stabling and stockyards". From June of that year, a number of "select" balls were held at the inn.

In March 1879 it was reported that the Crown & Anchor, along with several other inns in Adelaide, had "insufficient or poor accommodation, and are also little or much out of repair: in need of repair". In August 1879, leading colonial architect Thomas English called for tenders to undertake the construction work to rebuild the hotel, and a new two-storey building was constructed to replace the former single-storey building later that year to English's designs, costing around £1,534. English & Soward advertised for tenders for stabling at the rear of the building in March 1880.

In October 1928, architects Milne, Evans, and Russell submitted their plans for extensions and alterations to the building. The work was completed in 1929, with the alterations costing £5,000.

In 1983, the interior was remodelled.

=== Proprietors ===
James Ellery was the first licensee of the newly built Crown & Anchor in 1853.

In 1877, C. O'Leary was the licensee. In June 1878, George Beck was landlord, and had his licence extended in 1879 and 1880. He was charged and fined with selling liquor out of hours in 1889. In February 1891, Beck retired from the Crown and Anchor Hotel and moved to the Adelaide Hills with his wife to try his hand at cattle farming, and W.H. Fairlie took over the role as publican. In 1892 Peter Murphy took over, but after being charged with several crimes, relinquished the role to James Logan in 1893. In 1896 the licensees were John Brelag and Henry H. Higgins, who, like several before them, were fined for illegally serving liquor on a Sunday.

In September 1907 it was reported that Mrs. J. Calnan had become the new manager, with the article opining that the pub sold "the best beer in the market in the South Australian Brewing Coy's [sic] celebrated West- End Ale". On 21 June 1908 Mrs Calnan's husband, John Gilbert, died at the Crown and Anchor, aged only 38.

In September 1910, Mary Ann Jakeman was the licensee. She had a dispute which went to court regarding a ring which she alleged had been stolen from her by barman W.T. McPharlin. In May 1914, Louisa Buckingham and Harriet A. Miers, were joint licensees of the Crown and Anchor, and were taken to court for various breaches of the law, including serving liquor on Sundays, as did their successors, Louis P. Morgan and, in 1921 and 1925, George Owens.

Several more proprietors were charged with serving liquor unlawfully, including Mrs Susan Owens, who was the proprietor in 1930 and was charged in 1939. Publicans in the 1940s included Thomas John Street, W. Harrison, and Donald James

Henry Charles Bishop was the proprietor in 1952.

In 2017 Gerry Karidis bought the hotel and got the licence applied over the adjoining site, which became Roxie's, a bar-restaurant, in 2018. At this time, the event venue Chateau Apollo as well as a new restaurant upstairs, Midnight Spaghetti, were developed by new publican Tom Skipper, who became manager of all of the venues.

=== Associated incidents ===
On 2 May 1871, the landlady of the Crown and Anchor Hotel was arrested for stealing a dress from a local widow. In June 1877, the hotel was the site of an investigation by the city coroner, after the death of a man in the street nearby.On 8 June 1878, when George Beck was landlord, a resident charged another man with theft, so Beck held him until police arrived. The man was found guilty of stealing from three other residents as well, and was sentenced to a sentence of six months with hard labour. Many other crimes were reported to have occurred at the hotel over the years, mostly theft, with residents included among the victims as well as the perpetrators. Illegal gambling was reported a number of times.

It was reported that on 18 June 1932 a horse bolted from the Crown & Anchor stables onto Grenfell Street, and was later hit by a car in Pirie Street. The car was damaged but the horse was not badly injured.

=== Music ===
From the 1990s onwards, live music became a regular feature in the band room of the Crown & Anchor, which became affectionately known as "the Cranker". Musical styles have included rock, garage, punk, folk, and indie music. Aside for numerous local bands, many famous acts played including Tex Perkins, Kim Salmon, Fiona Horne, Rob Snarski, The Spazzys, Dan Luscombe (of The Blackeyed Susans), Lou Barlow (of Dinosaur Jr), and Todd Rundgren in 2018.

The front bar has often hosted a free DJ set by members of some big names while touring Adelaide, including The Hives, members of The Dandy Warhols, Pond, and Tame Impala. As of February 2025, DJ TR!P, aka Tyson Hopprich, entertains the crowd on a Wednesday night, when the Cranker sells schooners of beer (285ml / 10 fl oz in SA) for A$3 between 8pm and 10pm, since 26 February 2000.

The Crown & Anchor has built a significant reputation in the history of live music in Adelaide, and remains the few in the city centre that still host live music. As of 2024 the pub hosts around 25 to 30 bands a week.

=== Threat of demolition (2024) ===
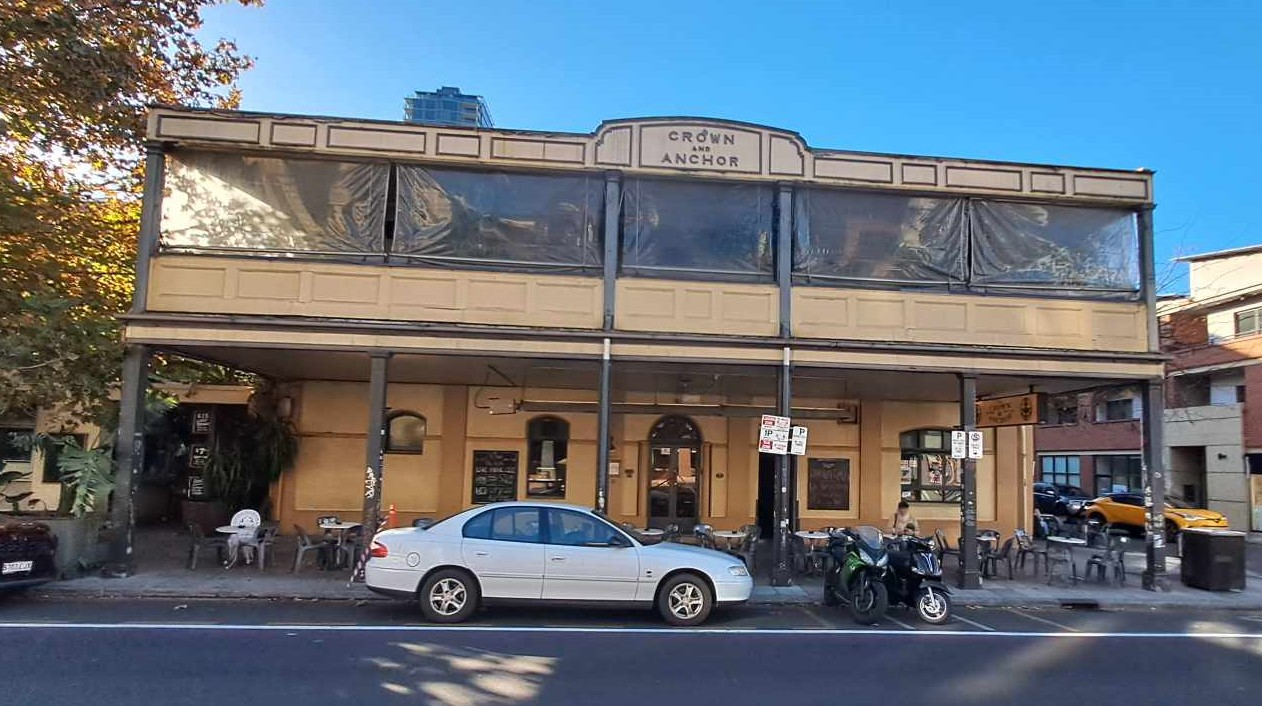
Crown & Anchor, Grenfell Street facade (May 2024)

The Crown & Anchor was heritage-listed on 1 November 2001 as a "Local Heritage Place (Townscape)". However this heritage listing only covered the facade, meaning that the rest of the building can be demolished. In 2013 South Australian developer Karidis Corporation purchased the land next to the hotel, at 188 Grenfell Street, and put in an application to construct a 13-storey residential building, but this did not proceed. They acquired the hotel in 2016.

In March 2024, it was revealed that Singaporean developer Wee Hur Holdings had lodged plans to transform the site at 188 and 196 Grenfell Street into multi-level student accommodation. Roxie's, a bar and restaurant, and an event venue called Chateau Apollo are also at the address. The proposal involved "partial demolition and adaptive reuse" of the buildings, with a new shop and other amenities on the ground floor. Plans of the proposed development were published on the PlanSA website on 19 April 2024, showing that nothing but the facades on Grenfell and Union Streets would be left under the proposal. These would be restored to their 1920s form, but without the balcony, and the front bar would be transformed into retail areas and a laundry and waste room. There would be 17 floors of studio apartments.

There was a public outcry at the news. A petition was launched to save the pub, and groups and events were created on social media, to "Save the Cranker". In April 2024, musicians from around the country posted pictures of themselves holding "Save the Cranker" signs. In mid-April the pub was inducted into the South Australian Music Hall of Fame, for its long commitment to original live music. Australian Greens MLC (state Legislative Council member) Rob Simms introduced a motion to state parliament calling on the Malinauskas government to strengthen heritage laws protect the venue, especially in light of Adelaide's status as a UNESCO City of Music. During the last week of April, the building was provisionally listed on the South Australian Heritage Register (that is, state heritage-listed rather than local), meaning that the entire building was protected it until its heritage values could be assessed. Thousands turned out at a rally on 28 April 2024, which was attended by MLCs Rob Simms and Michelle Lensink (Liberal), as well as the Lord Mayor of Adelaide Jane Lomax-Smith. The protests attracted national news coverage, and Superjesus bassist Stuart Rudd called the pub a "launchpad" for the band's career.

Premier Peter Malinauskas applied for the pub to be listed on the State Heritage Register, giving the building further protection, rather than simply opposing demolition. Rob Simms proposed an amendment to the state heritage laws, which only recognised architectural value, and not the cultural and social value of a site. On 2 May 2024, it was reported that a watered-down version of Simms' motion had passed the Legislative Council. Both the built heritage of the hotel and wider intended development site across to Frome Street are part of the state heritage application, which is as of 18 August 2024 was being considered by the South Australian Heritage Council.

The Government Architect at the Office for Design and Architecture SA, Kristeen McKay, reviewed and assessed the plan proposed by Wee Hur, and published her report on 17 June 2024. Overall, she did not support the current plans, being concerned about the shape, mass, and colour of the building, and its impact on the character of its surrounds, and also voiced concerns about the internal layouts of the residences. She recommended retaining the present usage of the pub.

On 18 August 2024, Premier Peter Malinauskas announced to approximately 2,000 people who had gathered in the city for another "Save the Cranker" protest that the plans had been changed and the pub would remain as a live music venue, with no tower block built above it. Under the deal brokered with the developers, the residential tower would be built on the adjoining plot, on the present site of Roxie's and Chateau Apollo, and would be 10 storeys taller than the original plan above the pub (29 instead of 19), subject to assessment. The Crown and Anchor would have to be closed for some time during the construction period, during which its live music room would have soundproofing added. He said that the state government would introduce "special-purpose legislation to secure the long-term future of the Crown and Anchor Hotel as a live music venue and provide ongoing protection for key live music pubs in the City of Adelaide against noise complaints from future residents". On 11 September 2024, the SA Government passed new legislation, including amendments by Robert Simms, giving the Crown & Anchor the same protection from demolition as state heritage places. The pub has to move out around March 2025 for up to two years as part of the deal struck with Wee Hur, whose altered plans for the site adjacent to the pub had been approved. The legislation also designates the entire Adelaide CBD as a "live music venue area", and will give protection to selected live music venues.

=== Temporary relocation (2025) ===
In March 2025 it was announced that the Crown & Anchor would be temporarily relocated in the Edinburgh Castle Hotel ("the Ed Castle") on Currie Street from July 2025 for two years, to allow construction to take place on the adjoining site. The Ed Castle closed in 2018 owing to a large student accommodation tower block being built behind it. The Cranker team and music programme would go with the move, and the pub kitchen would be utilised to provide meals. Roxie's and Chateau Apollo will close on 25 May, while Midnight Spaghetti will close in mid-July when the pub moves.

== Architecture ==
The design of the 1853 building designed by Thomas English is neo-classical style, with arched windows decorated by surrounding mouldings, and the facade is rendered. On the parapet above the corner entrance, it has a moulded crown and anchor insignia. However, the 1929 alterations were extensive, and included removal of many of the decorative features, as well as the addition of a long balcony along the Grenfell Street frontage.

There is a stone wall running northwards from Grenfell St along the boundary between Roxie's and Chateau Apollo, part of the original hotel stables that are listed on the hotel title.

== Location and services ==
The Crown & Anchor's address is (until July 2025) 196-198 Grenfell Street, also known as 35-39 Union Street, as it is on the corner of the two streets. "The Cranker" (at this location) hosts live music or comedy seven nights a week, many with free entry, and serves meals upstairs at "Midnight Spaghetti", and is open from Monday to Saturday from 12pm until 3am, and Sunday from 2pm until 3am. The event venue Chateau Apollo and bar restaurant Roxie's are also part of the establishment on Grenfell Street.

The publican, since 2017 and as of the time of the move in mid-2025, is Tom Skipper. Skipper had formerly co-owned The Maid and Magpie on Magill Road, Stepney, for seven years, before establishing food truck La Cantina, followed by Little Miss Mexico in January 2013 and various other restaurants, including Superfish, which became Chateau Apollo when he took over the management of The Cranker.

== Accolades ==
In April 2024, the pub was inducted into the South Australian Music Hall of Fame, for its long commitment to original live music.

In October 2024, the Cranker was named Best Live Music Venue at the 2024 Australian Hotels Association SA Awards for Excellence.

== See also ==
- List of oldest companies in Australia
