= Adelaide Youth Orchestra =

Australian symphony orchestra

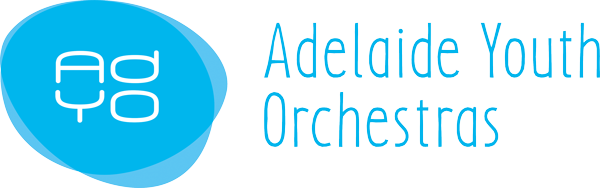
Logo

The Adelaide Youth Orchestra is an 80-member symphony orchestra based in Adelaide, South Australia.

The youth orchestra itself comprises members aged between 12 and 25 years. Four further ensembles fall under the AdYO banner - The Adelaide Youth Wind Orchestra (AdYWO), The Adelaide Youth Sinfonia (AdSi), catering mainly for middle school aged musicians, Adelaide Youth Winds (AYW) and the Adelaide Youth Strings (AYS), for string players aged 8 to 12.

AdYO performs a series of concerts during each year, including a major concert at the Adelaide Town Hall supported by all the ensembles of the Youth Orchestra organisation, and at Christmas.

== See also ==
- List of youth orchestras
