= Lion Arts Centre =

Arts centre in Adelaide, Australia

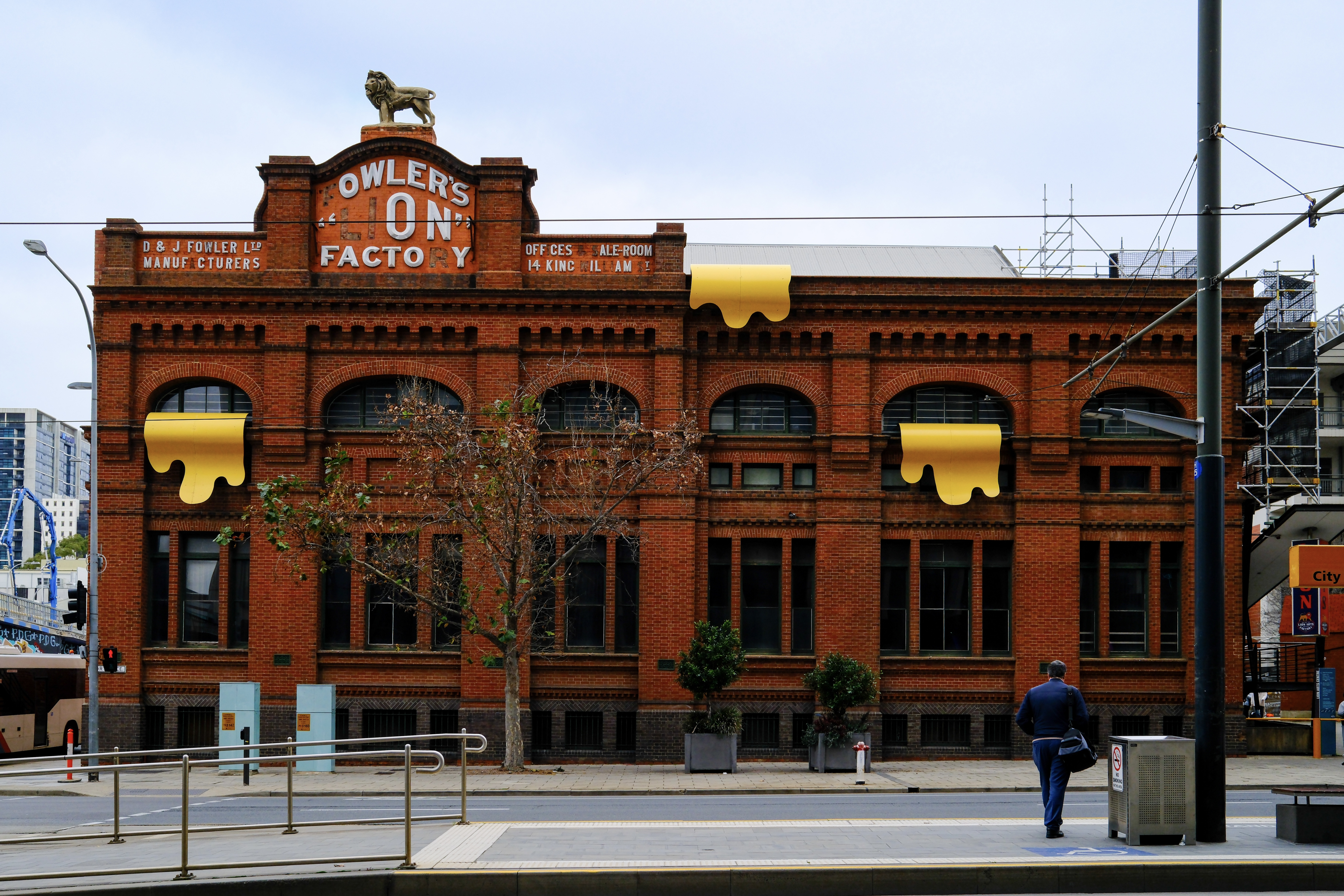
The Lion Arts Centre in August 2026

The Lion Arts Centre, also known as Fowler's Lion Factory and Fowlers Building, with the main music venue within known as the Lion Arts Factory (formerly Fowler's Live), is a multi-purpose arts centre, including studios, galleries, music and performance centres, and offices in Adelaide, South Australia. It is situated on the corner of North Terrace and Morphett Street in Adelaide's West End, in a refurbished and repurposed factory once owned by wholesale grocers D. & J. Fowler Ltd. With its distinctive red brick federation-style architecture, the 1906 building designed by Frank Counsell is state heritage-listed.

After its use as a factory ceased, the building started being used as a performance space. It was known as the Living Arts Centre from about 1986 until 1992, during which time the building was renovated, converted and renamed to Lion Arts Centre.

== History ==
=== The building ===
The Fowler's "Lion" Factory, with its distinctive parapet topped by a statue of a lion, was designed by architect Frank Counsell in federation style for D. & J. Fowler Ltd in 1906. The brickwork was built by W. Sander & Sons, while the lion statue took three months to be carved by a Melbourne stonemason, John Patrick Jackson. The building is noted for its high-quality brick detailing and the well-designed composition of the facade. The building was used for packaging Fowler's Lion brand of flour, and the (original and now restored) signage on the parapet still says 'Fowler's "Lion" Factory'. Fowler's wide range of Lion brand products, trademarked in 1886, were very popular.

The original symmetrical shape of the facade was destroyed in 1966, when the eastern wing was demolished for the widening of Morphett Street and the construction of two new bridges across North Terrace and the River Torrens.

=== Conversion to arts use ===
D & J Fowler was only taken over by Southern Farmers Ltd in 1982-83, but the factory lay vacant from around the middle of the 20th century, until the space was revived in the 1970s as offices and performance space for the Adelaide Fringe Festival, which included live music and was known as the Fringe Club.

In 1984, there was a Steering Committee appointed to investigate the feasibility of the Living Arts Centre, the precursor to the Lion Arts Centre, with the full conversion of the building planned in 1991. (Note: This is noted in the State Library Catalogue, on the catalogue entry for Papers relating to the Lion Arts Centre [mixed material] (1991): "This series comprises: minutes of meetings; questionnaires; brochures; correspondence; and interior design plans for the refurbishment and tenancy of the Crafts Council of South Australia and the Jam Factory at the Lion Arts Centre (previously known as the Living Arts Centre)." See also Report of the Steering Committee Appointed to Investigate the Feasibility of the Living Arts Centre (1984) and Lion Arts Centre Stage 2 development strategy (1993?) (See SLSA catalogue.)) AusStage lists ten sources which list performances at the Living Arts Centre between February 1986 and February 1990 (and one in 1994, but this may be an anomaly). In 1992 the factory and surrounds was converted into an arts centre, henceforth known as the Lion Arts Centre, which became home to a variety of arts organisations.

In 1988, a copy of the lion was installed on the parapet, the original having moved with D & J Fowler. The yellow material seen slurping over the wall from the roof would represent custard, signifying the shift from industrial-commercial use of the building to arts use. The Lion brand of custard powder is still on sale as at 2022 <https://079.drakes.com.au/lines/lion-custard-powder-vanilla-375g>.

== 1992–present ==
After the creation of the centre in 1992, its tenants moved in, including the Media Resource Centre, Dance Hub SA, and Craftsouth (formerly Craft Association of South Australia), a not-for-profit supporting visual artists and designers.

As of 2019, the Lion Arts Centre accommodates the Media Resource Centre, Nexus Arts, ACE Open galleries and studios, the State Theatre Company of South Australia offices and Guildhouse (formerly Craftsouth).

The JamFactory and Mercury Cinema are adjacent and sometimes regarded as part of the complex.

In November 2024 the state government announced a new program, called LOFT, in collaboration with the Australian Dance Theatre (ADT). The program, beginning in mid-2025, will include a dedicated space at Lion Arts, to be used for residencies and mentorship of dancers developing new dance works, with administrative support from ADT. Works developed in the LOFT space, located in the 1st floor studio formerly occupied by Dance Hub SA (which closed in mid-2024), would be showcased as part of Adelaide Fringe in 2026.

== Music ==
=== Music House ===
In 2000–2001, Music House at the Lion Arts Centre was established, to provide in order to promote and develop the contemporary music industry in South Australia. It occupied Level 1 of the building until 2002.

=== Music SA ===
From sometime before 2007 until 2015, the not-for-profit training and music promotion organisation Music SA was located on Level 1, with the address given as "Fowlers Building" for some of that time.

=== Fowler's Live ===
On 4 July 2003, the music venue named Fowler's Live opened on the ground floor. It hosted a wide range of live music, including The Bellrays, Paul Dempsey, Ben Kweller, and Sonic Youth. The Fowler's Live Music Awards ran from 2012 to 2014, before being rebranded as the South Australian Music Awards in 2015. The lease ended and Fowler's Live closed at the end of 2018.

=== Lion Arts Factory ===
With a tender process selecting the new lessees of the venue in August 2018, Ross Osmon and Craig Lock from Five Four Entertainment and Hugo Pedler from West Oak Hotel, along with design collaborators Sam, Simon and Tim Pearce of Frame Creative, put together a pitch and won the lease to start operating from 1 January 2019, under the name Lion Arts Factory.

After a major renovation in January 2019, the ground floor, basement and mezzanine are occupied by The Lion Arts Factory, a live music venue. Previously boarded windows had been opened up to let light in, paint stripped off the red brick walls, the main stage extended to 13 metres (43 ft) and the mezzanine reopened. Downstairs is the Coopers Green Room, with chesterfield sofas.

The emphasis is on live music, but management is also keen to host other forms of performing arts, in particular theatre and comedy. All genres of music–heavy metal, rock and goth, punk, electric, hip-hop, house and others–are featured. Capacity is 500 and the venue opens until 5am on weekends. The venue hosted Adelaide Fringe performances from 2020.

The venue won the South Australian Music Awards' Best Venue award for two years in a row, and contributes around A$7 million to the local economy annually.

Along with all live music venues, the Lion Arts Factory has been badly impacted by the COVID-19 pandemic in Australia, losing over 250 shows as of October 2021. The co-owners of the venue and Five Four Entertainment have asked for financial assistance from the state government, and a five-year extension of their lease, to keep their businesses from ruin.
