= The Transatlantics =

- Origin: Adelaide, Australia
- Genres: Deep funk, R&B
- Years active: 2007–2018
- Labels: Freestyle Records, Mecca Records
- Spinoffs: The Shaolin Afronauts
- Website: Archived website

The Transatlantics were a funk and soul band from Adelaide, South Australia, formed in 2007.

== Biography ==
The band was formed in 2007 by Adelaide-born musicians Ross McHenry, Lachlan Ridge, Kevin Van Der Zwaag and singer Tara Lynch, after they met at university. The band came to prominence through gigs with artists such as Eddie Bo, Roy Ayers and Ohmega Watts.

In 2008, some of the band members formed a new band, intended as a side-project to explore a freer style of music, calling themselves the Shaolin Afronauts. Both bands continued to make music in the following years.

After garnering a following within Adelaide throughout 2008, the Transatlantics embarked on a national tour in 2009 with soul diva Marva Whitney. The tour was cancelled when Whitney collapsed on stage at a performance at The Falls Festival in Lorne, Victoria. Despite this setback, the band continued to tour and were signed to Freestyle Records to release their self-titled, debut album in October 2010.

By this time, the band had grown to eight members. Most of the songs were their own, but the album included a cover of the Presets' "Talk Like That". Reviewers compared the band to the Melbourne deep funk band The Bamboos and American diva Sharon Jones.

The four original members still formed the core of the band as of 2011, with their ranks swollen to number ten musicians by 2012, when they recorded their second album. The Transatlantics second album, Find My Way Home, was released in October 2012. The vocals of the now three female vocalists (Tara Lynch having been joined by Naomi Keyte and Laura Knowling) were praised by one reviewer.

The band stopped working together from July 2013, until they returned to performing in January 2017. According to their Facebook page, they performed at the Melbourne Bowling Club in May 2018 and at the Grace Emily in Adelaide in December 2018.

== Discography ==
=== Albums ===
Title	Album details
The Transatlantics	Released: 11 October 2010; Label: Freestyler Records (FSRCD080); Format: CD, DD, LP
Find My Way Home	Released: 15 October 2012; Label: Mecca Records (MECCD002); Format: CD, DD

== Awards and nominations ==
=== National Live Music Awards ===
The National Live Music Awards (NLMAs) commenced in 2016 to recognise contributions to the live music industry in Australia.

Year	Nominee / work	Award	Result	Ref.
2016	Naomi Keyte	South Australian Live Voice of the Year	Won	
2023	Naomi Keyte	Best Folk Act	Nominated	
2023	Naomi Keyte	Best Live Voice in SA	Nominated	

== Individuals ==
=== Naomi Keyte ===
Before joining the Transatlantics, Keyte was in the indie band Gold Bloom, which performed at Laneway and Fuse Festivals and released an EP, Sidelines, on 22 September 2012.

Naomi Keyte released a solo album, Melaleuca, in 2017, a " a 10-track homage to Adelaide’s natural landscape", and was subsequently nominated for three South Australian Music Awards: Best Release, Best Folk, and Best Female Artist. She played at festivals Here's to Now in 2017, the Basket Range Festival and WOMADelaide in 2018 and OzAsia in 2019. She released a single called "Travelling Woman" in May 2020.

=== Tara Lynch ===
Original vocalist Tara Lynch married bass player Ross McHenry (leader of Shaolin Afronauts and a jazz trio since 2016), changing her surname to McHenry, and they have at least one child together, born around 2014. As of 2016 she was working for History SA.

== Members ==
As of 2010, the band members were listed as:

- Randall (Lachlan?) "Country" Ridge jnr – Guitar
- Kyra Schwarz – Trombone
- Kevin van der Zwaag – Drums & Good Vibes
- Chris Weber – Trumpet
- Tara Lynch – Vocals
- Jon "Sugarcane" Hunt – Baritone Saxophone
- Ross McHenry – Bass
- Kahil Nayton – Guitar

As of March 2012, the line-up was:

- Tara Lynch – Vocals
- Naomi Keyte – Vocals
- Laura Knowling – Vocals
- Randall "Country" Ridge jnr – Guitar
- Kyra Schwarz – Trombone
- Kevin van der Zwaag – Drums
- Chris Weber – Trumpet
- Jon "Sugarcane" Hunt – Baritone Saxophone
- Ross McHenry – Bass
- Dylan Marshall – Guitar
