= Australian Music Office =

The Australian Music Office is a division of the Australian Trade Commission (Austrade), a government agency which helps Australian companies succeed in export and international business. The Australian Music Office works with other Austrade posts to promote and ease entry of Australian artists and music companies into overseas markets.

The Australian Music Office helps to support and develop the Australian music industry by giving direct referrals and advice on export logistics, strategy and trends. They act as a liaison between various industry groups and develop partnerships to increase exposure and visibility of Australians in music abroad. The Australian Music Office identifies opportunities, helps plan strategy, and exposes clients to a network of customers that are normally difficult to access due to geography and industry expertise.

== History ==
As a result of the expansion of resources from the landmark AUSFTA agreement, The Australian Music Office was formed in August, 2005 as a new initiative by the Australian Government’s Trade commission. The purpose of the Australian Music Office is to help contemporary Australian musicians and artists pursue export around the world through innovative export initiatives.

== Offices ==
The Australian Music Office is a sub-office within The Australian Trade Commission (Austrade). Austrade has over 60 offices worldwide. There are arts, culture and entertainment export advisors in many of the offices; the main music offices are located in Los Angeles, London and Frankfurt. Bands and artists are required to first contact their local Austrade advisor in their home state, for initial advice and referrals to Austrade's international network. There are currently 17 Austrade offices and TradeStart offices in regional and rural areas throughout Australia.

In December 2016, APRA announced that it is establishing a new music industry association Australians in Music, to be set-up in Los Angeles and Nashville alongside Australians in Film.

== Export Market Development Grant (EMDG) ==
In 2005-06, 61 existing and potential music industry exporters received a total of $1.4 million in Export Market Development Grants, and generated $5.6 million in exports. Recent music industry recipients of Export Market Development Grants include Australian band John Butler Trio, music manufacturer and distributor Stomp and the Australian Youth Orchestra. The Australian Government's Export Market Development Grants (EMDG) scheme assists businesses enter into export and become sustainable exporters by reimbursing up to 50 per cent of their eligible export promotional expenses above a $15,000 threshold. The scheme supports a wide range of industry sectors and products, including inbound tourism and the export of intellectual property and know-how. The Australian Government offers grants up to $150,000 to Australian companies looking to export their product.

Typical covered expenses include:

- Travel costs and daily allowances for promotional visits, including trade show attendance.
- Production of marketing materials including promotional CDs.
- Certain costs associated with overseas in-store promotions, performances, or promotional loss-making tours.
- Advertisements, promotional literature, and some website expenses.

== Online Presence ==
The Australian Music Office maintains an online presence through the organisation’s website and on Myspace. The Australian Music Office has also established online partnerships with a number of music companies including AIR (Association of Independent Record Labels), Australian Music Online, Roocast and New Found Frequency.
