= CreateSA =

South Australian government agency

CreateSA is a business unit within the Department of the Premier and Cabinet (DPC) of the Government of South Australia, responsible for funding for the arts and the cultural heritage in South Australia. It originated as a separate agency called Arts South Australia (later Arts SA) in around 1996. In 2019 most of its functions were taken over by the DPC under Premier Steven Marshall, while some went to the Department for Education and others to the Department for Innovation and Skills. In September 2023, under the Malinauskas government, the arts were once again brought together under DPC. On 31 March 2025, as part of the new 10-year cultural policy, "A Place to Create", Arts SA was officially renamed CreateSA. Andrea Michaels, as Minister the Arts, is responsible for the body and the policy.

== History ==
=== Arts SA/Arts South Australia ===
Arts SA was created primarily as a funding body around 1996, (Note: The date was arrived at by interrogating the SLSA catalogue here. Previous to 1996, records were linked to the Dept for the Arts & Cultural Development (1993/4–1996), Dept for the Arts & Cultural Heritage (c.1991–3) and Dept for the Arts (1987–1990).) at which time it fell under the Department of Transport, Urban Planning and the Arts (DTUPA). It was responsible for the development of and funding for the arts sector within South Australia, and was responsible for nine statutory corporations and a number of not-for-profit arts organisations.

In September 1997, Arts Minister Diana Laidlaw and then new CEO Timothy O'Louglin completely restructured Arts SA. Previously, it had operated under art form divisions, but the new structure created three divisions: arts leadership, professional development and emerging artists; cultural tourism and export; and the development of new commissions, events and festivals.

From 2015 until August 2018, Arts South Australia was headed by Peter Louca, former chief of staff to Minister Jack Snelling and one-time Labor Party candidate for the federal seat of Mayo. Peter Louca instigated the re-branding of Arts SA to Arts South Australia in 2016.

In 2016, following significant federal funding cuts experienced by several South Australian small to medium arts organisations, Arts South Australia was criticised by Arts Industry Council for South Australia for not providing enough financial support to the independent arts sector. In 2016 Arts South Australia operated with a budget of $140 million, less than one percent of the state budget. It was then a division of the Department of State Development, overseen by the Minister for the Arts. In 2016 Arts South Australia established the campaign "Made In Adelaide" to export and promote South Australian artists at the Edinburgh Fringe Festival.

=== 2018 Marshall government ===
Premier Steven Marshall became responsible for the portfolio after being elected in March 2018, with the arts coming directly under DPC. After August 2018, responsibilities were dispersed (see below).

His government released their "Arts & Culture Plan 2019-2024" in 2019.

=== 2023 Malinauskas government ===
In September 2023, under the Malinauskas government, the arts were once again brought together under DPC, in a "united arts portfolio", with Andrea Michaels as Minister for Arts (appointed March 2022). The minister started work on developing a new cultural policy, due to be released in mid-2024.

Former City of Adelaide CEO Clare Mockler was appointed executive director of Arts South Australia in January 2025, to commence once her term as interim CEO of the South Australian Museum ends. Former artistic director of the Adelaide Festival, Ruth Mackenzie, was appointed to oversee finalisation and publication of the policy.

On 31 March 2025, following a consultation process involving over 2,000 community members, a new 10-year cultural policy, "A Place to Create" was launched by the government. This policy aligns with the federal government's cultural policy, "Revive" as well as the state's economic policy. At the same time, Arts South Australia was officially renamed CreateSA. CreateSA is a business unit within the South Australian Government responsible for looking after the arts, cultural, and creative industries.

== Responsibilities (current) ==
=== Artlab Australia ===
Artlab Australia is a government agency that "provides expert services for the preservation, care and management of the state's cultural collections". It works mainly for and in collaboration with major South Australian collecting institutions, but also provides services and support for collections that are maintained by various communities around the country as well as internationally, on a fee-for-service basis.

Established as the State Conservation Centre of South Australia in 1985, the unit has been located in the North Terrace cultural precinct since its beginning, between the Migration Museum and the Art Gallery of South Australia (street address 70 Kintore Avenue).

The specialist staff who work on the conservation of materials are mostly graduates of a University of Canberra program on the Conservation of Cultural Materials. They are qualified to work on a range of materials, including paper, photographs, textiles, sculptures, and heritage building features in the laboratories, and also provide advice on optimum storage conditions for collections. Artlab serves libraries, museums, art galleries, Aboriginal art and craft centres, and many other clients. Artlab Australia is one of few rare book conservation services in Australia, and also cares for large technology items. Other conservation and restoration of other types include "murals and decorative paintwork, historic interiors, mosaic and terrazzo floors, stained glass windows, carved timberwork, carpets and curtains, furniture and other fittings such as lights, balustrades and decorative railings".

Restoration projects have included the reredos at St Peter's Cathedral, Adelaide and chapels at New Norcia monastery in Western Australia. Artlab has also undertaken several projects outside of Australia, including cultural preservation in Bali in partnership with the Indonesian Government and others, funded by the World Bank, and work in Taipei and Hong Kong.

Artlab's services include disaster preparedness planning, environmental management of display and storage conditions in order to prevent deterioration, and research and analysis that contributes to both the development of conservation practice and to a greater knowledge and understanding of cultural artefacts and works of art. It also offers preventive conservation for collections, training of conservators through internships, conservation capacity building projects overseas, and education and advisory services to support communities in the preservation of their cultural heritage. Artlab has given courses in several Asian countries, and in 1999 developed a training package called reCollections.

As of 2005, Artlab Australia employed 25 staff, which made it the largest conservation facility in Australia. It operated as a business enterprise within Arts SA, with initial investment made by the South Australian government and possessing the capability and policy to run a commercial service. At that time, Artlab warned of the "critical skills shortage...within the heritage industry", and the need for providing courses for people to become stone masons, wheelwrights, carriage makers, and gilders.

On 12 September 2024, Sarah Feijen was appointed as the director of Artlab Australia.

=== Music Development Office ===
CreateSA includes the Music Development Office (MDO) which was established in 2014 to develop policy to support, build, and grow the local music industry.

The MDO was established as a result of a report by British music promoter Martin Elbourne as Thinker in Residence, an initiative supported by the Don Dunstan Foundation, state government, City of Adelaide, and others, in 2014, along with the adjunct St Paul's Creative Centre, with the goal of "build[ing] pathways into creative and industry development, with city vibrancy and economic benefit being the ultimate outcomes", by facilitating grants, fellowships, and other means of developing the careers of contemporary musicians.

The MDO delivers support through grant programs as well as strategic initiatives designed to develop creative intellectual property, business growth, and industry development for artists, live music venues, event promoters, and other music businesses in South Australia. As of 2025 it is implementing the "2023-25 MDO Strategic Plan: Supporting Revival", while consultation on a new strategic plan is under way.

=== Other responsibilities ===
CreateSA has supports Aboriginal and Torres Strait Islander arts through its "Aboriginal and Torres Strait Islander Arts Strategy for South Australia". This supports initiatives such as the First Nations Emerging Playwrights Fellowship, which is being supported by Brink Productions, a statewide network of First Nations creatives, a First-Nations-led dance program at The Mill, a writing program, and various workshops, as well as running a grants program. Its advisory panel is made up of Aboriginal and or Torres Strait Islander leaders in SA.

Funding is provided by CreateSA for a number of organisations, including the statutory authorities (art gallery, museum, SAFC, Adelaide Festival, etc.); major organisations (such as Adelaide Film Festival, Australian Dance Theatre, Music SA, etc.), various youth organisations, including Northern Sound System, and other small-to-medium non-profit arts bodies.

== People ==
Ministers for the arts have been:

- Diana Laidlaw (1993–2002)
- Mike Rann (5 March 2002 – 21 October 2011), while also serving as Premier
- John Hill (21 October 2011 – 21 January 2013)
- Jay Weatherill (21 January 2013 – 26 March 2014), while also serving as Premier
- Jack Snelling (26 March 2014 – 17 September 2017)
- Jay Weatherill (18 September 2017 – 19 March 2018), while also serving as Premier
- Steven Marshall (March 2018 – March 2022)
- Andrea Michaels (March 2022 – present), along with the portfolios of Small and Family Business, and Consumer and Business Affairs

Chief executives of Arts SA included:

- Timothy O'Loughlin (1997–2000) (Note: No earlier mention of a CEO before 1997 was found, so it seems likely that O'Loughlin was the first.) (afterwards promoted to CEO of DTUPA)
- Kathie Massey (December 2000 – 2004)
- Greg Mackie (2004–2008)
- Alexandra Reid (2009–2015)
- Peter Louca (2010–2018)

== Responsibilities (historic) ==
=== Arts South Australia until 2018 ===
Statutory Authorities reporting to the Arts South Australia were:

- Adelaide Festival Corporation
- Adelaide Festival Centre Trust
- Art Gallery of South Australia
- Carrick Hill
- Country Arts SA
- History Trust of South Australia
- South Australian Film Corporation (SAFC)
- South Australian Museum
- State Library of South Australia (SLSA)
- State Opera of South Australia
- State Theatre Company of South Australia (STCSA)

Other organisations under their umbrella included:

- Adelaide Film Festival
- Carclew (centre for youth performing arts development)
- JamFactory
- Music SA (formerly AusMusicSA, established 23 July 1997)
- The Music Development Office (MDO), responsible for the management of the Contemporary Music Grants Program and the Jon Lemon Artist-in-Residence Program, as well as a number of other grants.
- Patch Theatre Company
- Windmill Theatre Company

Other responsibilities included:

- The South Australian Ruby Awards (from 2006), which recognise outstanding achievement in South Australia's arts and culture sector.
- Management of Australia's oldest intact mainland theatre, The Queens Theatre (2010–2018; then taken over by GWB McFarlane Theatres).

=== August 2018 transfers and creations ===
In August 2018, the Department for Education took over Carclew, History Trust of South Australia, and the Patch and Windmill Theatre Companies

The Department for Innovation and Skills assumed responsibility for the SAFC, Adelaide Film Festival, JamFactory, Music SA, Music Development Office, and the newly-created GamePlus (for the video game industry)

Responsibility for the eleven statutory authorities (listed above) were transferred to the Arts and Culture section within the Department of the Premier and Cabinet (DPC). DPC also provided funding to Australian Dance Theatre, Adelaide Fringe, Adelaide Symphony Orchestra, and Tandanya National Aboriginal Cultural Institute, and took over management of the Ruby Awards and the Made in Adelaide Awards.

SLSA assumed management of the Adelaide Festival Awards for Literature.
