= Nexus Arts =

Arts organisation in Adelaide, Australia

Nexus Arts, formerly a collective known as the Multicultural Arts Workers Committee, then Nexus Multicultural Arts Centre, is a not-for-profit contemporary arts organisation and venue in Adelaide, South Australia.

== History ==
Nexus began as an artist collective called the Multicultural Arts Workers Committee, which helped to nurture public appreciation of the growing number of culturally diverse arts and artists, as well as helping some of the new artist migrants to resettle in Adelaide.

In 1984 the Committee remodelled itself into the Nexus Multicultural Arts Centre, to provide spaces to bring the multicultural artists' work to South Australian audiences and to help connect the diverse communities, and in 2015 the name was changed to Nexus Arts.

Its exhibitions were affected by the COVID-19 pandemic in Australia, but it adapted by putting exhibitions online, including an exhibition entitled I Am Because You Are: Illustrations Of Existence, featuring the work of Wamala Kyeyune Joseph and local emerging artist Tailor Winston in May 2020.

== Description ==
Nexus Arts is located in the Lion Arts Centre, in the Adelaide's West End. It hosts live music shows and other events, including Adelaide Fringe events. It also has a visual arts program and gallery space.

Nexus are the only contemporary arts organisation with a focus on culturally and linguistically diverse (CALD) practice. It supports both CALD and First Nations artists by providing programs and opportunities for them, and provides exposure for these artists to a broader Australian audience.
