= Martin Elbourne =

English performing arts promoter

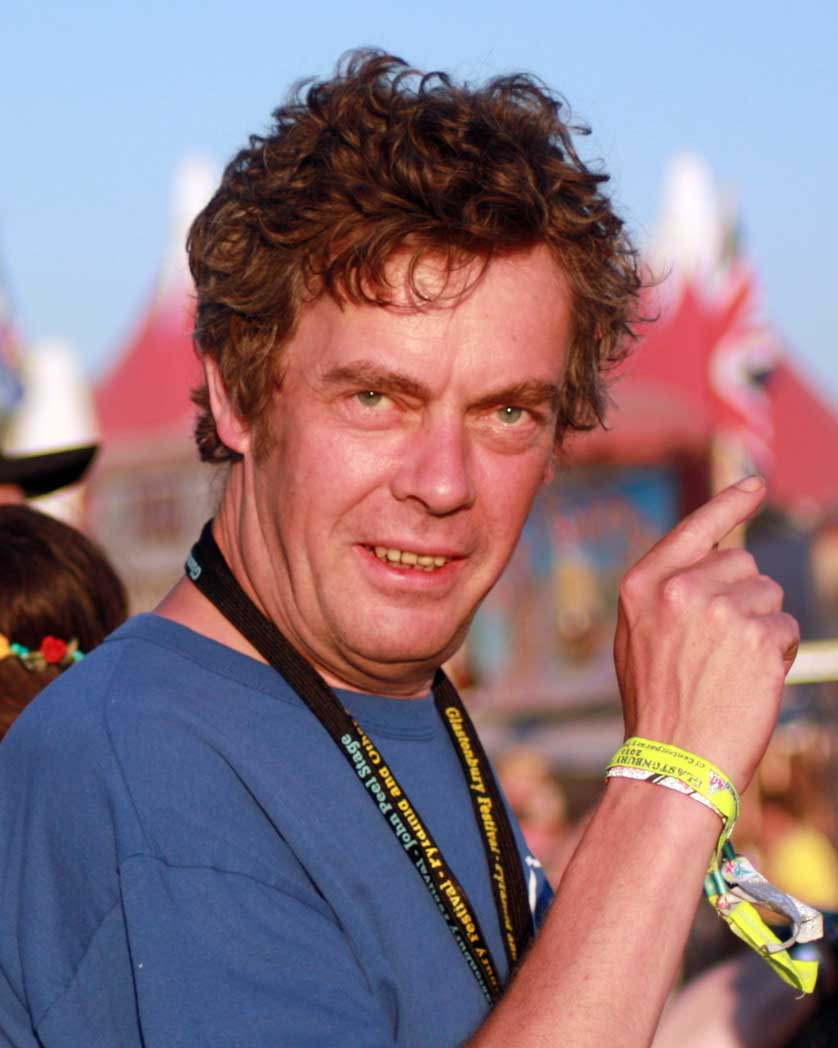
- Martin Elbourne Glastonbury 2010
- Born: 19 January 1957; Carlisle, Cumberland, England
- Citizenship: UK
- Occupation: Promoter of the performing arts
- Years active: 1972–present
- Known for: Performing arts promotions, Glastonbury Festival, The Great Escape

Martin Elbourne (born 19 January 1957 in Carlisle, Cumberland) is an English performing arts promoter. Elbourne was brought up near the village of Knebworth, Hertfordshire. His first job, at age fifteen, was working for the local stately home Knebworth House which in the mid-seventies became the biggest venue in the United Kingdom for outdoor shows and hosted bands such as Led Zeppelin, The Rolling Stones and Pink Floyd.

He is best known as the promoter of rock concerts and is a well-known figure for his work in music and music festivals in the UK. He has been an advisor to, and one of main bookers for, the Glastonbury Festival for 30 years and has helped and advised numerous other festivals.

== Career ==
Born on 19 January 1957 in Carlisle, Cumbria, Elbourne grew up in Hertfordshire, north of London. In 1977, he set up his own political party the Epicurean (ethical hedonist '0' movement) which won the student union elections. One of the election pledges was to open up the student union venue to non-students, leading it to become the main venue in Bristol for punk and post-punk bands. He studied Economics at Bristol University, in South West England earning an Honours B.A. The main bar at the university is still named after the Epicurean movement.

He started promoting bands outside of the student union and became involved with the Ashton Court Festival, then the largest free event in the UK, and started going to Glastonbury. Upon leaving university he founded the award-winning Bristol Recorder, a combined vinyl LP compilation and a magazine. This led to his meeting local resident Peter Gabriel. Elbourne and Gabriel among others ended up funding and co-promoting the first WOMAD Festival. Whilst critically acclaimed, the resultant financial losses led to Gabriel playing a reformed Genesis Concert and Elbourne relocating to London.

Elbourne ended up working for Rough Trade as a booking agent. His most famous clients were New Order and The Smiths. His relationship with New Order continued until the death of Rob Gretton. He managed various bands including Green on Red, David Rudder, and Gaye Bykers on Acid, and gradually became more involved with the Glastonbury Festival, ending up as its main booker.

In 2003, Elbourne co-founded The Great Escape Festival, held in Brighton, which has music industry related conferences during the day and features live music in the evenings.

Sébastien Nasra collaborated with Elbourne and, in 2006, co-founded M for Montreal, a platform for showcasing local musicians and helping them expand their international networks.

U.K.-based artist manager Stephen Budd, Jon Mac, who co-founded The Great Escape; Vijay Nair, the managing director of India-based promoters and artist management company Only Much Louder; and Elbourne organized the NH7 Weekender Rock Festival in India in 2010.

In 2012, the Don Dunstan Foundation, in partnership with Adelaide City Council, the Australia Council, Arts SA, Adelaide Fringe, the Department of the Premier and Cabinet and Regional Development Australia Barossa hired Elbourne as a thinker-in-residence on a project named "Reverb". The project aimed "to create collaboration and unified action for a healthy, more sustainable music scene" in South Australia. A report based on his recommendations was produced in 2013, entitled The future of live music in South Australia.

Martin Elbourne co-founded the Music Cities Convention with consultancy Sound Diplomacy in 2015, with the first edition taking place alongside the Great Escape Festival.

In May 2021 Elbourne became a Councillor for Reigate and Banstead representing the Liberal Democrats UK, and was re-elected in May 2024.
