= I Love You (Teen Jesus and the Jean Teasers album) =

2023 debut studio album

Studio album by Teen Jesus and the Jean Teasers
- Released: 6 October 2023
- Studios: Eddie's, Rye, Victoria
- Genres: Punk rock; bubblegum
- Length: 37:06
- Label: Domestic La La
- Producer: Oscar Dawson

Teen Jesus and the Jean Teasers chronology
Pretty Good for a Girl Band (2022)	I Love You (2023)	Glory (2025)

Singles from I Love You
- 1. "Lights Out" Released: 30 March 2023; 2. "Never Saw It Coming" Released: 7 June 2023; 3. "I Used to Be Fun" Released: 27 July 2023; 4. "Salt" Released: 6 September 2023

I Love You is the debut studio album by Australian rock band Teen Jesus and the Jean Teasers, released on 6 October 2023 through Domestic La La. Produced by Oscar Dawson, the record marks a sonic departure from their previous work, "balancing bubblegum pop, ear-bashing rock and thunderous punk." Upon release, I Love You peaked at number 6 on the ARIA Albums Chart.

At the 2023 J Awards, the album was nominated for Australian Album of the Year.

At the AIR Awards of 2024, the album was nominated for Best Independent Rock Album or EP, while "I Used to Be Fun" was nominated for Best Independent song. Oscar Dawson was nominated for Independent Producer of the Year for his work on this album, and Domestic La La was nominated for Independent Marketing Team of the Year.

At the 2024 ARIA Music Awards, the album won Teen Jesus and the Jean Teasers the Michael Gudinski Breakthrough Artist.

== Background and composition ==
In May 2022, Teen Jesus and the Jean Teasers released their debut extended play (EP), Pretty Good for a Girl Band. The lyrical matters of I Love You are mostly based on events from the band members' personal lives since then, from enduring relationship breakdowns, to moving states and changing jobs. According to the band, the songwriting is much more personal than their debut. For example, in "Never Saw It Coming", drummer Neve van Boxsel opens up about her experiences with sexual assault.

Produced by Oscar Dawson of Holy Holy, I Love You was in production for over a year. It is their most diverse work, and according to The Canberra Times, a "far cry from the punk-driven sounds of the band's [debut] EP." This sonic evolution was made possible due to collaborating with other artists and working closely in the studio.

This feels so much more of a representation of all of us and our music tastes because this is the first body of work, we've all collaborated on.

— Neve van Boxsel

"Never Saw it Coming" is the band's first acoustic song, and the first to be written and sung by van Boxsel. It was released as the second single to introduce listeners to a new sound from the band. "Salt" is the band's first collaboration, performed with Melbourne band the Grogans. The two bands decided to work on it together when they met on tour in 2022.

== Release and promotion ==
On 30 March 2023, the band released the lead single "Lights Out," their first new song since their 2022 EP. According to the band, the song was written about "claiming your sexuality, confidence and not caring about what the drunk strangers in a Canberra nightclub will think of you." "Lights Out" was supported by a music video directed by band drummer Neve van Boxsel.

The second single, "Never Saw It Coming," followed on 7 June. The album title, cover artwork and track listing were announced the next day, and the release date was 8 September 2023, although this was later changed to 6 October 2023. "I Used to Be Fun" was issued on 27 July as the third single, when the band announced a nationwide album tour. On 6 September, a fourth single, "Salt," was released.

A deluxe edition, titled I Love You Too, features three additional tracks and was released on 20 September 2024.

== Critical reception ==
Professional ratings
Review scores
Source	Rating
The Arts Desk	3/5 stars
The AU Review	5/5 stars
Clash	7/10
Rolling Stone	4/5 stars

The album was met with positive reviews. Writing for The AU Review, Dylan Marshall said I Love You featured a "mix of full-blown punk moments, mixed in with earnest love songs and a genuinely lovely smattering of indie rock," calling the album a "belter from start to finish." Thomas Green of The Arts Desk said its tracks tend towards "catchy new wavey power pop or snarling numbers raging at mistreatment in love/sex," concluding the band had found a unique space in the music scene.

== Track listing ==
All tracks are written by Anna Ryan, Jaida Stephenson, Neve van Boxsel and Scarlett McKahey, unless otherwise noted.

I Love You track listing
No.	Title	Writer(s)	Length
1.	"I Used to Be Fun"	Alex Markwell; Ryan; Stephenson; van Boxsel; McKahey	2:41
2.	"Treat Me Better"	Oscar Dawson; Ryan; Stephenson; van Boxsel; McKahey	3:36
3.	"Backseat Driver"		3:33
4.	"I Love You"		3:06
5.	"Your House My House"		2:17
6.	"Salt" (featuring the Grogans)	Ryan; van Boxsel	3:07
7.	"I Don't Want It"		2:49
8.	"Cayenne Pepper"		0:40
9.	"Ahhhh!"		2:28
10.	"Lights Out"	Dawson; Ryan; Stephenson; van Boxsel; McKahey	2:54
11.	"Toe Bone"	Adam Newling; Ryan; Stephenson; van Boxsel; McKahey	3:35
12.	"Never Saw It Coming"		3:07
13.	"Kissy Kissy"		3:07
Total length:			37:00

I Love You Too track listing
No.	Title	Length
14.	"Dull" (featuring Softcult)	3:15
15.	"Please Me"
16.	"We Thought It Would Be a Good Time But It Was a Bad Time"

Notes

- "Ahhhh!" previously appeared on the band's 2022 EP, Pretty Good for a Girl Band.

== Personnel ==
Credits reflective of liner notes.

Musicians

- Teen Jesus and the Jean Teasers – writing, performing
- Oscar Dawson – writing (tracks 2, 10)
- Alex Markwell – writing (track 1)
- Adam Newling – writing (track 11), additional guitars (tracks 2, 13)

Technical

- Oscar Dawson – producer, mixing
- Leon Zervos – mastering
- James Tidswell – producer (track 9)

== Charts ==
Chart performance for I Love You
Chart (2023)	Peak position
Australian Albums (ARIA)	6
