= The Rot That Grows Inside My Chest =

2023 studio album by Teenage Joans

Studio album by Teenage Joans
- Released: 13 October 2023
- Genre: Pop-punk
- Length: 40:14
- Label: Domestic La La
- Producer: Jarred Nettle

Teenage Joans chronology
Taste of Me (2021)	The Rot That Grows Inside My Chest (2023)

Singles from The Rot That Grows Inside My Chest
- 1. "Superglue" Released: 2 May 2023; 2. "Candy Apple" Released: 10 August 2023; 3. "5 Things I Can Taste" Released: 22 September 2023

Professional ratings
Review scores
Source	Rating
Wall of Sound	8.5/10

The Rot That Grows Inside My Chest is the debut studio album by Australian indie rock duo Teenage Joans, released on 13 October 2023 via Domestic La La. Produced by Jarred Nettle, who worked with the duo on their debut EP Taste of Me (2021), the album "indicate[s] a sonic diversity previously unheard of by the band." It was supported by three singles and a national tour from November 2023.

At the AIR Awards of 2024, the album was nominated for Best Independent Punk Album or EP.

At the 2024 ARIA Music Awards, the album was nominated for Best Hard Rock/Heavy Metal Album.

== Release and promotion ==
Teenage Joans signed to Domestic La La in early 2022, and released the lead single "Superglue" on 2 May 2023. On 10 August, the band announced the title and track listing of their debut studio album, with the scheduled release date of 13 October. The cover artwork was designed by Melbourne graphic designer Giulia McGauran. A second single was also issued the same day, titled "Candy Apple". On 22 September 2023, "5 Things I Can Taste" was released as the third single.

In November 2023, the band embarked on a national tour supporting the album.

== Composition ==
Produced by Jarred Nettle, The Rot That Grows Inside My Chest marks a sonic departure from their previous work, influenced by the sound of 5 Seconds of Summer and Camp Cope. Some tracks like "Ruby Doomsday" and "Moneymoneymoney" include string arrangements and trumpets for the first time by the band.

Some songs were in the works for years before their debut EP Taste of Me (2021) was released – "Honey (And Other Sweet Things)" and "Superglue" were both written in 2019. "Sweet Things Rot" was written by guitarist Cahli Blakers when she was 16, before she had even met her bandmate, drummer Tahlia Borg. Most newer album tracks were written at Borg's house.

== Short film ==
In January 2024, the band released their debut short film, a visual accompaniment for The Rot That Grows Inside My Chest. It was directed by Jamie Al Kayyali and stars the duo playing fictionalised versions of themselves, soundtracked by album's tracks. They held premiere screenings in Sydney, Melbourne and Adelaide.

== Track listing ==
All tracks are written by Cahli Blakers and Tahlia Borg.

The Rot That Grows Inside My Chest track listing
No.	Title	Length
1.	"Hospital Bed"	2:01
2.	"Honey (And Other Sweet Things)"	3:23
3.	"Superglue"	3:24
4.	"Yoke"	2:34
5.	"Candy Apple"	3:46
6.	"You're Not the President"	2:45
7.	"Sweet Things Rot"	1:58
8.	"Ruby Doomsday"	3:34
9.	"My Dentist Hates Me!!!"	3:01
10.	"Moneymoneymoney"	3:24
11.	"Tennis Skirt"	3:04
12.	"5 Things I Can Taste"	3:56
13.	"Kaleidoscopes"	3:24
Total length:		40:14

== Personnel ==
Musicians

- Cahli Blakers – vocals, guitar, bass guitar, writing
- Tahlia Borg – vocals, drums, writing
- Emma Luker – strings
- Lewis Tito – trumpet

Technical and promotional

- Jarred Nettle – producer, mixing
- Cahli Blakers – producer (track 7)
- Samuel K Sproull – mastering
- Giulia Giannini McGauran – cover art

== Charts ==
Chart performance for The Rot That Grows Inside My Chest
Chart (2023)	Peak position
Australian Albums (ARIA)	59
