= Taste of Me =

EP by Teenage Joans
- Released: 28 May 2021
- Genres: Alt-rock; indie rock; pop-punk
- Length: 17:51
- Labels: Teenage Joans (independent); Domestic La La
- Producer: Jarred Nettle

Teenage Joans chronology
Taste of Me (2021)	The Rot That Grows Inside My Chest (2023)

Singles from Taste of Me
- 1. "Something About Being Sixteen" Released: 15 January 2021; 2. "Ice Cream" Released: 26 March 2021; 3. "Wine" Released: 27 May 2021

Taste of Me (Note: Stylised in all caps.) is the debut extended play by Australian alternative rock duo Teenage Joans, released independently through Domestic La La on 28 May 2021. The EP was solely written and recorded by members Tahlia Borg and Cahli Blakers, with production handled by Jarred Nettle.

Preceded by three singles—"Something About Being Sixteen", "Ice Cream", and "Wine"—Taste of Me received critical acclaim, was the recipient of Best Release and Best Cover Art at the 2021 South Australian Music Awards, and peaked at number 7 on the ARIA Top 20 Vinyl Albums Chart.

== Background ==
Taste of Me is the duo's first new music since their single "Three Leaf Clover" in 2020, which was the winning track in the 2020 Triple J Unearthed High competition, and ranked at number 87 in Triple J's Hottest 100 of 2020. The EP also follows an extensive period of touring for the duo.

== Composition ==
Each of the songs were written throughout 2019.

"Ice Cream" is a "delectable hit of fun alt-rock", which showcases "the girls' dynamism at its strength", whilst "Something About Being Sixteen" is "a coming-of-age anthem" with "big riffs and even bigger personality".

== Release ==
On 26 March 2021, Taste of Me was announced, alongside the release of second single "Ice Cream". On 30 March, the duo revealed the EP's tracklist and artwork on Twitter. On 28 May 2021, Taste of Me was independently released, on digital download and streaming formats. On 27 July, Taste of Me received a vinyl release. On 28 April 2023, a deluxe edition vinyl of the EP was released in two colour variants, containing both previously released singles—"By the Way" and "Three Leaf Clover", an acoustic version of "Wine", and a Montgomery remix of "Terrible". Each were limited to 300 copies apiece.

== Promotion ==
=== Singles ===
"Something About Being Sixteen" was released on 15 January 2021 as the lead single. "Ice Cream" was released on 26 March 2021 as the second single. "Wine" was released on 27 May 2021 as the third and final single. "Wine" reached number 84 on Triple J's Hottest 100 of 2021.

=== Live performances and tour ===
On 27 March 2019, the duo appeared on 101.5 FM Radio Adelaide's Breakfast program with Zoe Kounadis and Tom Mann, debuting an unreleased song titled "Therapist" and discussing their forthcoming releases. On 26 March, alongside the EP's announcement, the duo announced a headline tour with the Chats. The tour includes dates in Byron Bay, Wollongong, and Canberra.

== Critical reception ==
Professional ratings
Review scores
Source	Rating
The AU Review	4/5 stars
The Music	4/5 stars

Dylan Marshall of The AU Review labelled Taste of Me "five tracks of undeniably fun and charismatic guitar hooks". He continued: "A sign of a good song is being able to enjoy it irrespective of your age or personal music preferences, and on Taste of Me, these songs are in abundance." The Music's Keira Leonard gave the EP a positive review, writing that it "contains all the perfect methods and madness of an Aussie indie release, while remaining unlike any band before them." She continued, saying: "their five-track debut certainly won't get tiring. It's angsty, wholesome, unified and so damn fun." Joe Dolan, another writer for The Music, was also positive, calling the EP "incredible", stating it "offers a splendid sampler to the music of the group." Dolan added that "it's an all out, upbeat rock release that is devoid of any implied immaturity by their age", and concluded by comparing the release favourably to that of Camp Cope and Courtney Barnett. NME Australia journalist Alex Gallagher described the EP as "a thrilling formal introduction to their cathartic, bittersweet pop-punk", stating that "[it] makes clear why Teenage Joans have resonated so strongly with their passionate community – and why they'll stick around."

=== Mid-year lists ===
Taste of Me was listed on the Music's "Top 25 Albums of 2022 (So Far)" list.

== Awards and nominations ==
=== South Australian Music Awards ===
Year	Nominee / work	Award	Result	Ref.
2021	Taste of Me	Best Release	Won	
2021	Samuel Graves and Eve Burner for Taste of Me	Best Cover Art	Won	

== Commercial performance ==
Taste of Me debuted and peaked at number 7 on the ARIA Top 20 Vinyl Albums Chart, on the chart dated 8 May 2023.

== Track listing ==
All tracks are written by Tahlia Borg and Cahli Blakers. All tracks produced by Jarred Nettle, unless otherwise noted.

Taste of Me track listing
No.	Title	Length
1.	"Ice Cream"	3:30
2.	"Apple Pie"	3:17
3.	"Something About Being Sixteen"	3:33
4.	"Therapist"	3:22
5.	"Wine"	4:09
Total length:		17:51

Taste of Me physical deluxe edition
No.	Title	Producer(s)	Length
6.	"Terrible"	Nettle	3:38
7.	"By the Way"	Ben David	2:51
8.	"Three Leaf Clover"	David	3:16
9.	"Wine (Acoustic)"	Nettle	4:43
10.	"Terrible (Montgomery remix)"	Phoebe Parkinson	3:41
Total length:			18:09

== Personnel ==
Adapted from the deluxe EP's liner notes.

=== Musicians ===
- Tahlia Borg – vocals, writing, drums (all tracks)
- Cahli Blakers – vocals, writing, bass guitar, guitar (all tracks)

=== Technical ===
- Jarred Nettle – production (1–6, 9)
- Ben David – production (7–8)
- Phoebe Parkinson – production (9)
- Samuel K. Sproull – mastering (all tracks)

=== Promotional ===
- Eve Burner – artwork
- Samuel Graves – photography
- Will Johnstone – photography

== Charts ==
Chart performance for Taste of Me
Chart (2023)	Peak position
Australian Vinyl Albums (ARIA)	7

== Release history ==
Taste of Me release history and details
Region	Date	Edition	Format(s)	Label	Catalogue	Ref.
Various	28 May 2021	Standard	Digital download; streaming	Teenage Joans (independent)	Not applicable	
Australia	27 July 2021	Standard	LP	Teenage Joans (independent)	TJOANS0001	
Australia	28 April 2023	Deluxe	LP (Limited to 300 copies each)	Domestic La La	DLL028LP / DLL028LPA	
