= Pretty Good for a Girl Band =

2022 EP by Teen Jesus and the Jean Teasers

EP by Teen Jesus and the Jean Teasers
- Released: 13 May 2022
- Genre: Punk rock; riot grrrl
- Length: 15:01
- Label: Domestic La La
- Producer: James Tidswell; Alex Lahey

Teen Jesus and the Jean Teasers chronology
Creepshow (2017)	Pretty Good for a Girl Band (2022)	I Love You (2023)

Singles from Pretty Good for a Girl Band
- 1. "Ahhhh!" Released: 23 July 2021; 2. "Miss Your Birthday" Released: 16 November 2021; 3. "Girl Sports" Released: 29 March 2022

Pretty Good for a Girl Band is the debut extended play (EP) (Note: Technically their debut EP was Creepshow (2017) but it has since been "scrubbed out of existence" and has been removed from streaming services. A preponderance of publications call Pretty Good for a Girl Band their debut instead.) by Australian rock band Teen Jesus and the Jean Teasers, released on 13 May 2022 via Domestic La La. Produced by James Tidswell and Alex Lahey, the record won Best Independent Punk Album or EP at the 2023 AIR Awards and received three other nominations for the band.

== Composition ==
Lyrical themes on Pretty Good for a Girl Band include facing the misogyny that the female band members face, with lead singer Anna Ryan describing "Girl Sports" as: "a big middle finger to all the men that have treated us like we’re less than in the music industry". The track was inspired by bass guitarist Jaida Stephenson's male dentist who told her she should "stick to girl sports".

Sonically, the bassline in "Girl Sports" was inspired by the song "War" by English rock band Idles. Further, the slow burning closing track "Bull Dragon" was musically inspired by "505" by Arctic Monkeys. Lyrically, Stephenson said the band wanted to channel the same emotional energy as the work of Waax.

In terms of recording, Stephenson said that one of the tracks was recorded two and a half years prior to the EP's release. "Girl Sports" was massively altered in the studio, with the band saying they cut out half a verse, re-wrote the chorus and completely changed the arrangements and instrumentation.

== Release ==
The lead single, and the band's first after signing to Domestic La La, "Ahhhh!" was released on 23 July 2021. It later polled at number 117 in the Triple J Hottest 200 of 2021. On 16 November, the second single "Miss Your Birthday" was released, which was co-written by Alex Lahey.

On 29 March 2022, the band announced the title, cover art and release date of their debut EP. The news was accompanied by its third and final single, "Girl Sports", which was described by Ellie Robinson from NME as a "notedly darker cut for the Canberra-native quartet" featuring "more grisly guitar runs, snappy, cymbal-heavy drums and cutthroat lead vocals". The track later polled at number 55 in the Hottest 100 of 2022. The band embarked on a nationwide tour supporting the EP in August 2022.

== Critical reception ==
Professional ratings
Review scores
Source	Rating
Under the Radar	8/10
Wall of Sound	8/10

Writing for Under the Radar, Andy Von Pip concluded that the record is a "spiky and impressive debut EP that fizzes with modern riot grrrl energy and swaggering melodies and encourages you to push back against reductive societal expectations and follow your own path".

Reviewing for The AU Review, Dylan Oxley said Pretty Good for a Girl Band is "bursting with energy and irony". He praised Ryan's songwriting, writing their "candid lyrics are more reflective than angsty and the whole group channels their inner punks with an assertive eloquence".

Ebony Story of Wall of Sound said "every song is basically a singalong" and praised the EP's catchy choruses and lyrics, making for a satisfying debut. She concluded that "it hits all the spots you've been waiting to itch since [the band] first hit the scene".

== Track listing ==
All tracks are written by Anna Ryan, Jaida Stephenson, Neve van Boxsel and Scarlett McKahey, unless otherwise noted.

Pretty Good for a Girl Band track listing
No.	Title	Writer(s)	Producer	Length
1.	"Ahhhh!"		James Tidswell	2:24
2.	"Up to Summit"	Alex Markwell; Ryan; Stephenson; Boxsel; McKahey	Tidswell	3:32
3.	"Miss Your Birthday"	Alex Lahey; Ryan; Stephenson; Boxsel; McKahey	Tidswell	2:48
4.	"Girl Sports"		Lahey	3:14
5.	"Bull Dragon"		Lahey	3:01
Total length:				15:01
