= Playback 808 =

Australian independent record label

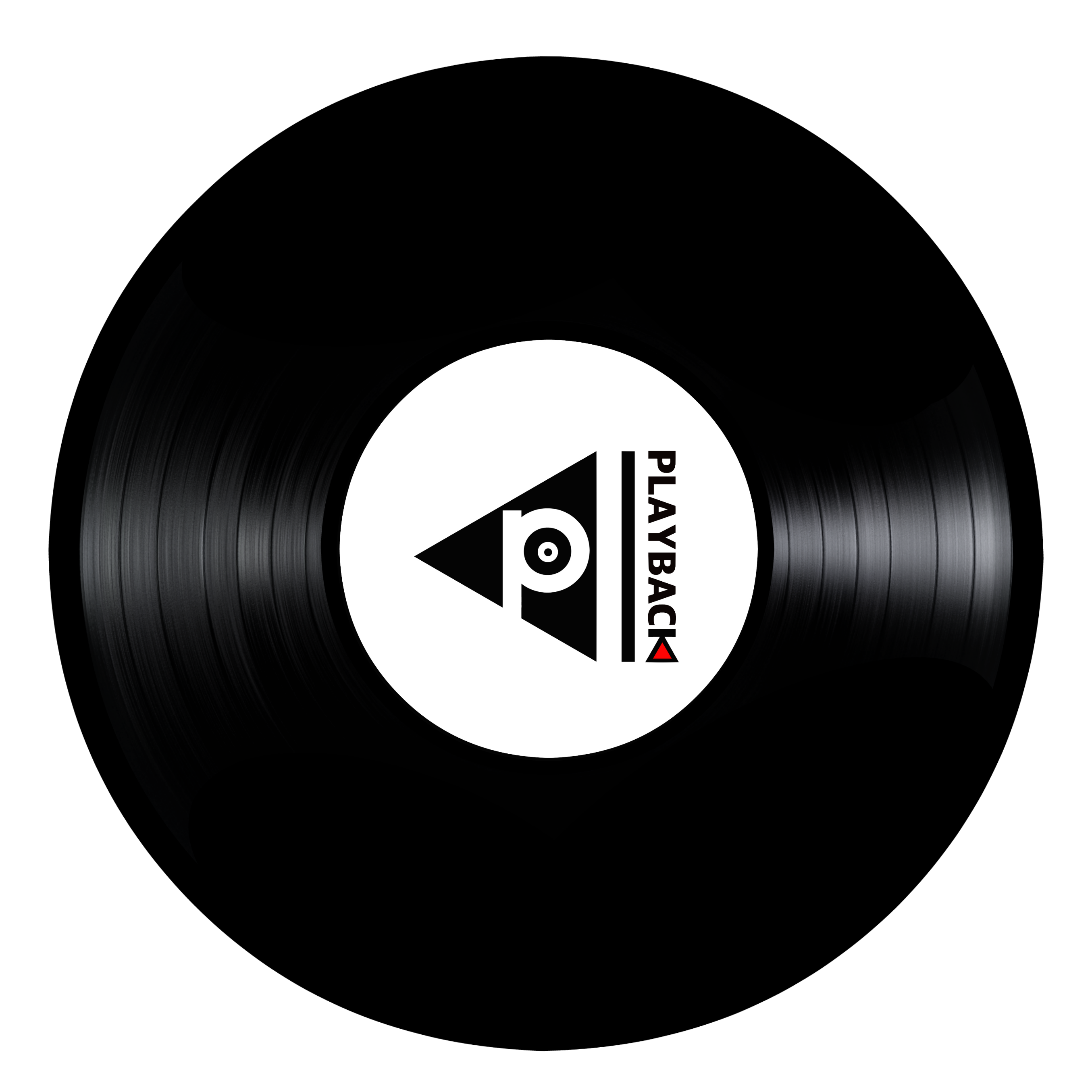
- Playback Records
- Parent company: Playback Records
- Founded: 2011
- Founder: DyspOra
- Status: Active
- Distributor: Independent
- Genre: Hip hop - R&B - Soul
- Country of origin: Australia
- Location: Adelaide

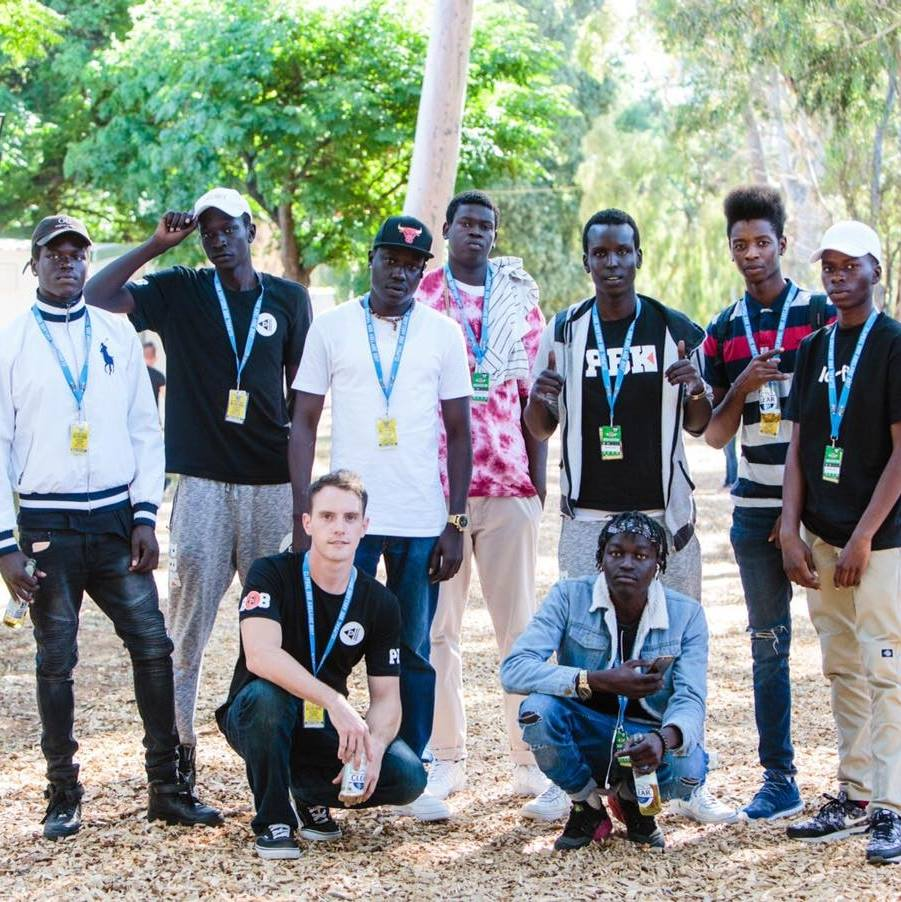
Playback 808 Artists backstage at Clipsal 500, Adelaide 2017

Playback 808 is an Australia-based independent record label and creative movement founded in 2011 by recording artist, activist and poet Gabriel Akon (a.k.a. DyspOra). The imprint is independently distributed and releases most of its content digitally.

Artists include E L K, NeSs, Eman, Ajak, Lord Levi, Elsy Wameyo and DyspOra himself working with producers JC, LC, Will Fortune & the Artful Dodger. Playback 808 produces hip-hop, rhythm & blues, and soul music from Adelaide, South Australia.

== History ==
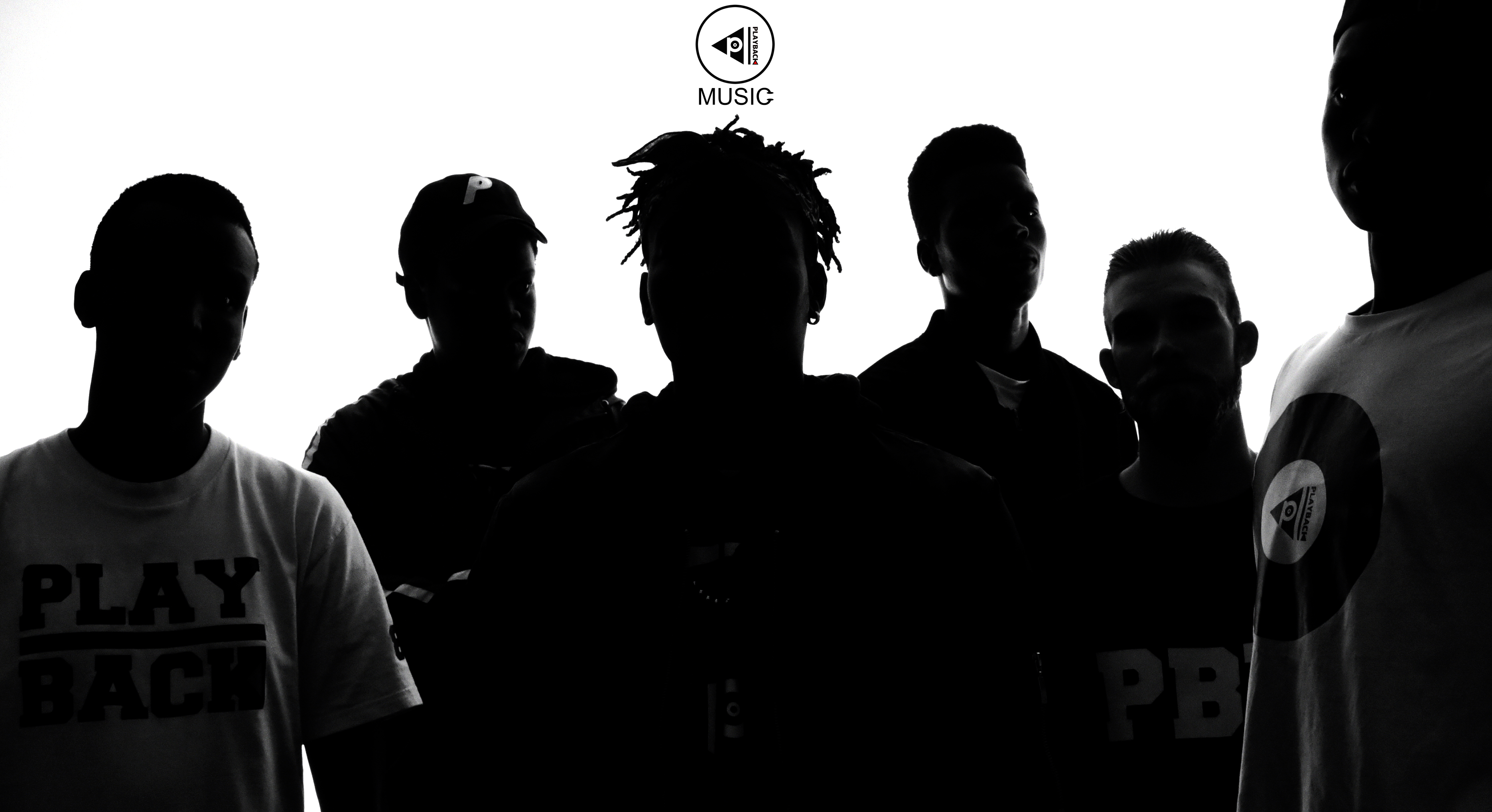
PBK808 Music, NSS 2016

The label's roots can be traced back to DyspOra's last year in high school and the 2011 release of his first mixtape, "S2ML". The South Sudanese Australian artist spent his youth working on his rhythm and poetry skills while paying close attention to the diversifying hip-hop culture in Australia.

Several early recording sessions with close friend and local producer Luke "LC" Chapman led DyspOra to bring his cousin Eman to the makeshift studio. Citing the growing influence of the internet on an evolving music industry, DyspOra shared his vision of creating a label and creative movement that focused on overlooked talent.

Playback 808 was established and upon the label's founding, Eman, Ajak, Kuei & NeSs joined and the small team began recording with in-house producer JC. The songs and freestyle sessions were then filmed by local director T Vision and uploaded to YouTube, where they began to build a following. Despite the buzz they were generating, the young MCs were still considered outsiders by the wider Australian hip-hop community and thus had limited opportunities to perform in the city's live music venues. They began appearing on stage at community events and giving impromptu live performances at parties.

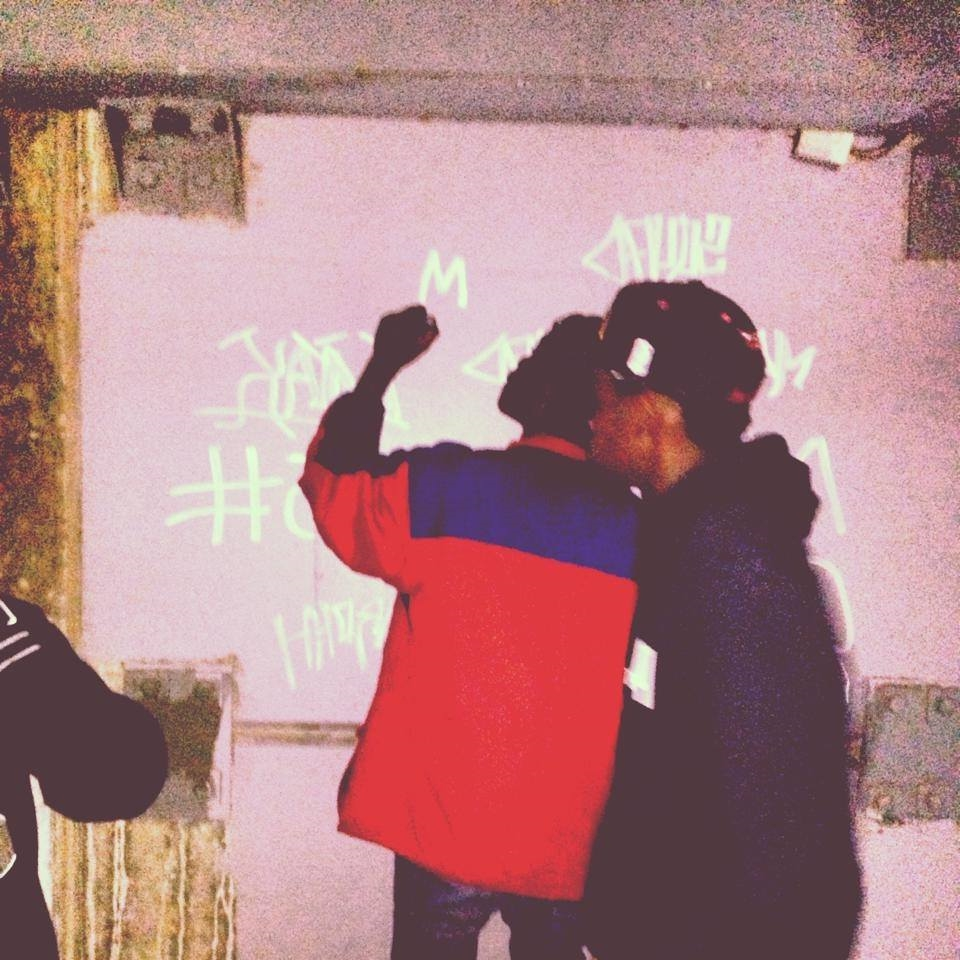
NeSs, Death Before Dishonour

With a roster of mostly teenagers, the imprint prioritised artist development and began attracting some of Adelaide's most promising young artists, songwriters, producers, engineers and video directors. Following a 2014 visit to East Africa, DyspOra heard songs from MAJIIK's unreleased project for the first time and invited him to join the label. Upon MAJIIK's return to South Australia, he, DyspOra & Eman unleashed 'TERROR', a single which "drops you straight into a war zone".

In 2015, a 15-year-old E L K began accompanying Eman to the studio where he carefully studied his creative peers and immersed himself into the Playback 808 ecosystem before being initiated the following year. The teenage lyricist "shows maturity and confidence well beyond his years, with his charismatic, demanding flow one that complements the smooth jazz production on LUV"; his first EP release through Playback 808. Melbourne-based Lord Levi is a member of the GRMLNS collective and the most recent addition to the Playback 808 roster. The 18-year-old lyricist took the internet by storm after several viral videos and a recent remake of Quentin Miller's "Potential".

Playback 808 took part in the Northern Sound System's N1 recording program and released several singles in 2016 including "Tranquillity", "Suspect", "Jump off" and "Scrimmage". Later that year, ABC News broadcast a feature story on Playback 808 nationally. Following a successful PBK808 showcase in the summer of 2016, Playback 808 artists were chosen to perform at the 2017 Clipsal 500 alongside The Hilltop Hoods, Seth Sentry, Aaradhna, Funkoars, Vents & K21. Shortly after their Clipsal 500 appearance, members of the label supported Kerser on his Tradition national tour and performed live at the Art Gallery of South Australia.

== Description and credits ==
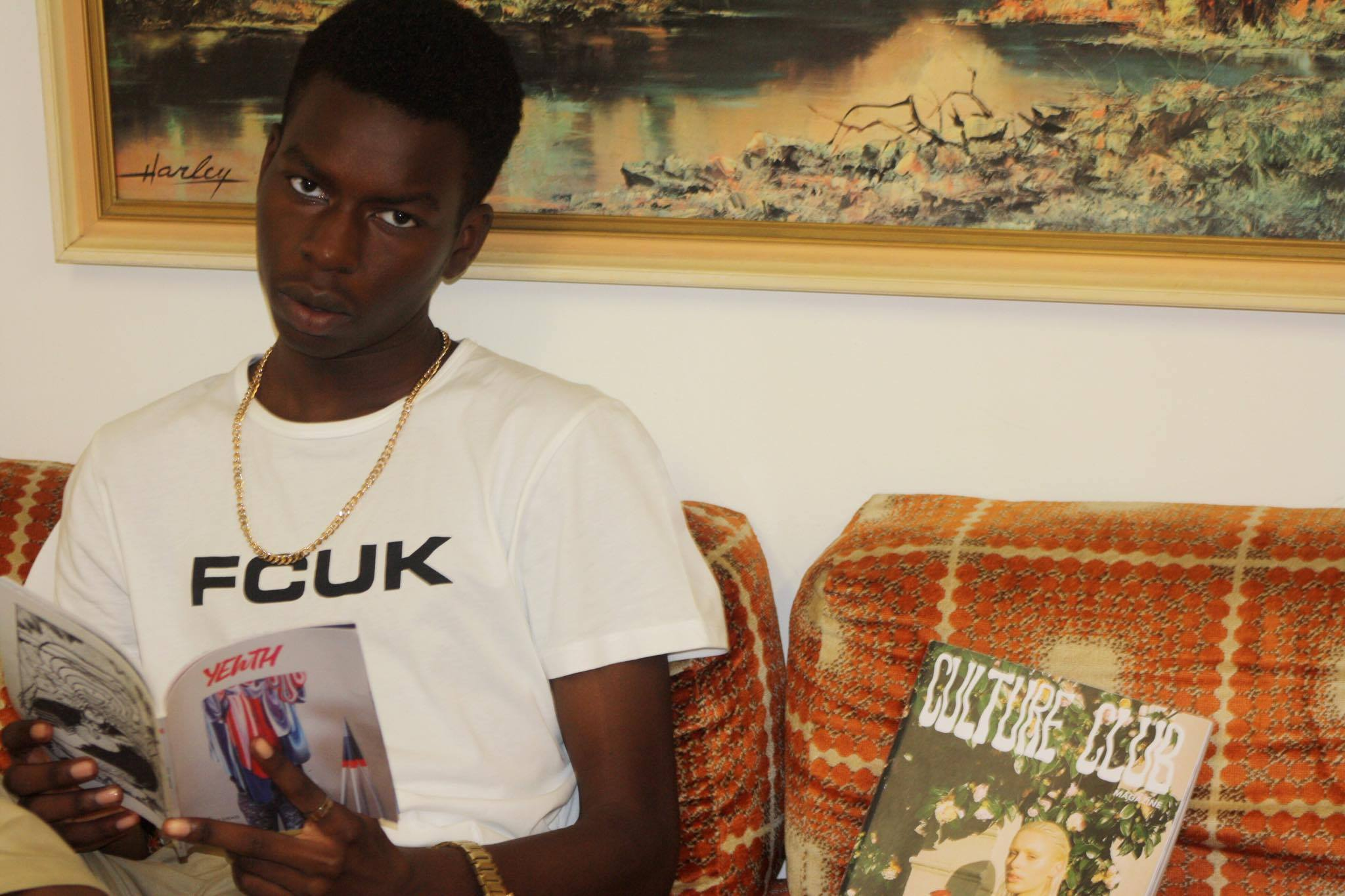
Playback 808's youngest Artist, ELK 2017

Playback808 produces a mix of hip-hop, rhythm & blues, and neo-soul music. Their artists have featured in magazines such as Rolling Stone, ToneDeaf, TheAuReview, YEWTH, Complex and Swampland, and played at Clipsal 500, Root down festival, Groovin The Moo, Scouted (part of Umbrella: Winter City Sounds), South Australian Music Awards, Miss Africa, refugee advocacy events, the Art Gallery of South Australia, Adelaide Fringe, Sanaa Festival, and the Adelaide Festival.

== Artists ==
Artists signed to Playback 808 include (as of July 2018):

- DyspOra
- Eman
- NeSs
- Ajak
- E L K /èlk/ELK
- Lord Levi
- Elsy Wameyo (the first woman signed to the label)
- Majiik

== In-house producers ==
- MetaBeats
- Lo-fly
- The Artful Dodger

== Discography ==
=== Mixtapes ===
- Soundtrack 2 My Life - DyspOra (2011)
- CTMD - DyspOra (2013)

=== Extended Plays (EPs) ===
- LUV - èlk
- REBELUTION - DyspOra (May 16, 2019)
