= Northern Sound System =

Music education centre for youth in Adelaide, South Australia

Northern Sound System (NSS) is a dedicated youth centre focused on music, broadcasting, and other creative industries, located in Elizabeth, a northern suburb of Adelaide, South Australia.

== Background ==
The Northern Sound System was established in 2007 by the City of Playford, assisted by funding from the Australian Government, and is located in a converted basketball stadium at 71 Elizabeth Way, Elizabeth. Created partly to help high youth unemployment in the area, it gives young people the opportunities to learn skills they might not acquire elsewhere.

== Programs and facilities ==
NSS has offered programs, courses or workshops in various skills, including DJing, hip hop music, youth choir, gaming, animation, songwriting, and music production. Some of the programs are run as after-school programs. One of the lead music educators at the centre as of 2021 is member of synth-pop band Heaps Good Friends, Nick O'Connor. It has evolved over the years to include the teaching of technical skills, and also teaches sound engineering, lighting, event production, photography, and digital content creation.

It includes recording studios, a live music venue accommodating around 400 people, spaces for rehearsal, and provides opportunities for young people to develop their musical talents and connect with people in the music industry and audiences. It also has facilities for live broadcasts, and caters for the creation of content for podcasts, YouTube, radio programs, and Twitch streaming.

== Events and collaborations ==
In 2016, a video projection of young musicians from NSS was shown at the Zimbardo Centre in Katowice, Poland, as part of the as part of the zDOLNE PODZIEMIE festival. The collaboration came about through Adelaide and Katowice both being UNESCO Cities of Music.

In December 2020, a project called Pixelated North was launched, which involved the creation of NSS within the videogame Minecraft by young people at NSS.

In 2026, a new project called "Next Wave: Building Creative Careers" partners young musicians with videographers and photographers, who provide them with a music video as well as mentorship.

As part of the 2026 Adelaide Fringe in February through March, NSS is holding performances at its location and the Launch Pad skate park.

=== WOMADelaide collaboration ===
In January 2021, NSS partnered with WOMADelaide in a collaboration known as WOMADelaide x NSS Academy, to provide training and development program for emerging Aboriginal South Australians and multicultural artists. The year-long programme was developed in partnership with Aboriginal-owned production company Balya Productions, includes workshops, masterclasses and live gigs, and aims to provide connections to professional mentors for 10 local musicians or groups, to help them develop performing skills.

The program identified 10 artists in its first year or operation, with MRLN x RKM (Marlon Motlop and Rulla Kelly-Mansell) supporting Vika & Linda and Midnight Oil at WOMADelaide, held at King Rodney Park that year. Other artists involved in the 2021 programme included:

- Jimmy Jamal Okello, aka Sokel
- Barnaba$
- Elsy Wameyo
- Estee Evangeline
- Katie Aspel
- Tilly Tjala Thomas
- Dem Mob
- Sonz of Serpent

Sokel, Elsy Wameyo, and Sonz of Serpent performed on the Zoo Stage and Frome Park Pavilion at Botanic Park at WOMAD in 2022.

In the second round of WOMADelaide x NSS Academy, seven artists were selected in mid-2022, including Dem Mob, singer-songwriter Elizabeth Ruyi, Sierra Leone-born singer-songwriter WaiKid, and Māori hip hop artist Taiaha.

In July 2023, WOMADelaide and NSS Academy selected ALITA, Nestor Again, Nimpala Rose, Rob Edwards, and Sofia Menguita as mentees for the program.

In 2025, indie band Pomegranates, led by Neo, took to the NSS stage at WOMADelaide. Neo started at NSS aged 14, and, after taking a lighting technician internship, started working there.

== Recognition ==
In 2018, educator Nick O'Connor was awarded the Geoff Crowhurst Memorial Award at the Ruby Awards, in recognition of his "outstanding contribution to community cultural development".

In November 2021, WOMADelaide x NSS Academy won the Best Innovation award at the South Australian Music Awards.

== Alumni ==
Alumni of the centre not mentioned above include:

- Tkay Maidza
- Pinkish Blu
- George Alice
- Teenage Joans
- DyspOra
- TOWNS
