= Taste of Me (disambiguation) =

Taste of Me is a 2021 EP by Teenage Joans.

Taste of Me may also refer to:

- "Taste of Me", a 2013 song by Gala
- "Sabor a Mí" (Spanish for "Taste of Me"), a 1959 bolero by Álvaro Carrillo
