= 2023 J Awards =

19th Annual J Awards

J Awards of 2023
- Date: 13 November 2023
- Venue: Australia
- Website: abc.net.au/triplej

Television/radio coverage
- Network: Triple J

The 2023 J Awards are the 19th annual J Awards, established by the Australian Broadcasting Corporation's youth-focused radio station Triple J.

The eligibility period for releases took place between November 2022 and October 2023. The nominations were announced on 1 November 2023 and winners will be announced on 13 November 2023. G Flip and Genesis Owusu were nominated in two categories. The award for Australian Live Act of the Year is new for 2023, celebrating live music.

== Awards ==
=== Australian Album of the Year ===
Albums chosen for their creativity, musicianship and contribution to Australian music.

List of Australian Album of the Year nominees
Artist	Album	Result
Angie McMahon	Light, Dark, Light Again	Nominated
G Flip	Drummer	Won
Genesis Owusu	Struggler	Nominated
Gretta Ray	Positive Spin	Nominated
Holy Holy	Cellophane	Nominated
Lastlings	Perfect World	Nominated
Matt Corby	Everything's Fine	Nominated
Polaris	Fatalism	Nominated
Teen Jesus and the Jean Teasers	I Love You	Nominated
Troye Sivan	Something to Give Each Other	Nominated

=== Double J Artist of the Year ===
The artists who impressed Double J with their musical excellence and contribution to Australian music.

List of Double J Artist of the Year nominees
Artist	Result
Bad//Dreems	Nominated
Briggs	Won
Jen Cloher	Nominated
Kylie Minogue	Nominated
RVG	Nominated

=== Australian Video of the Year ===
This award celebrates creativity, originality and technical excellence in music videos.

List of Australian Video of the Year nominees
Director	Artist and Song	Result
Nick Rae, Brayden Carter, Corey Webster	3% featuring The Presets – "Our People"	Nominated
Joshua Moll, Oliver Kirby, Calmell Teagle, Catherine Stratton	Cat & Calmell – "Feel Alive"	Nominated
Toby Morris	Middle Kids – "Bootleg Firecracker"	Nominated
Kyle Caulfield	Royel Otis – "Kool Aid"	Nominated
Moonboy Studios	Shaba featuring Uzi – "4K to the Middle East"	Won

=== Unearthed Artist of the Year ===
Five artists set for massive things.

List of Unearthed Artist of the Year nominees
Artist	Result
Big Wee	Nominated
Dice	Nominated
Felivand	Nominated
The Grogans	Nominated
Miss Kaninna	Won

=== Australian Live Act of the Year ===
New for 2023.

Australian Live Act of the Yea nominees
Artist	Result
G Flip	Nominated
Genesis Owusu	Won
Julia Jacklin	Nominated
King Gizzard and the Lizard Wizard	Nominated
King Stingray	Nominated
