= West Thebarton =

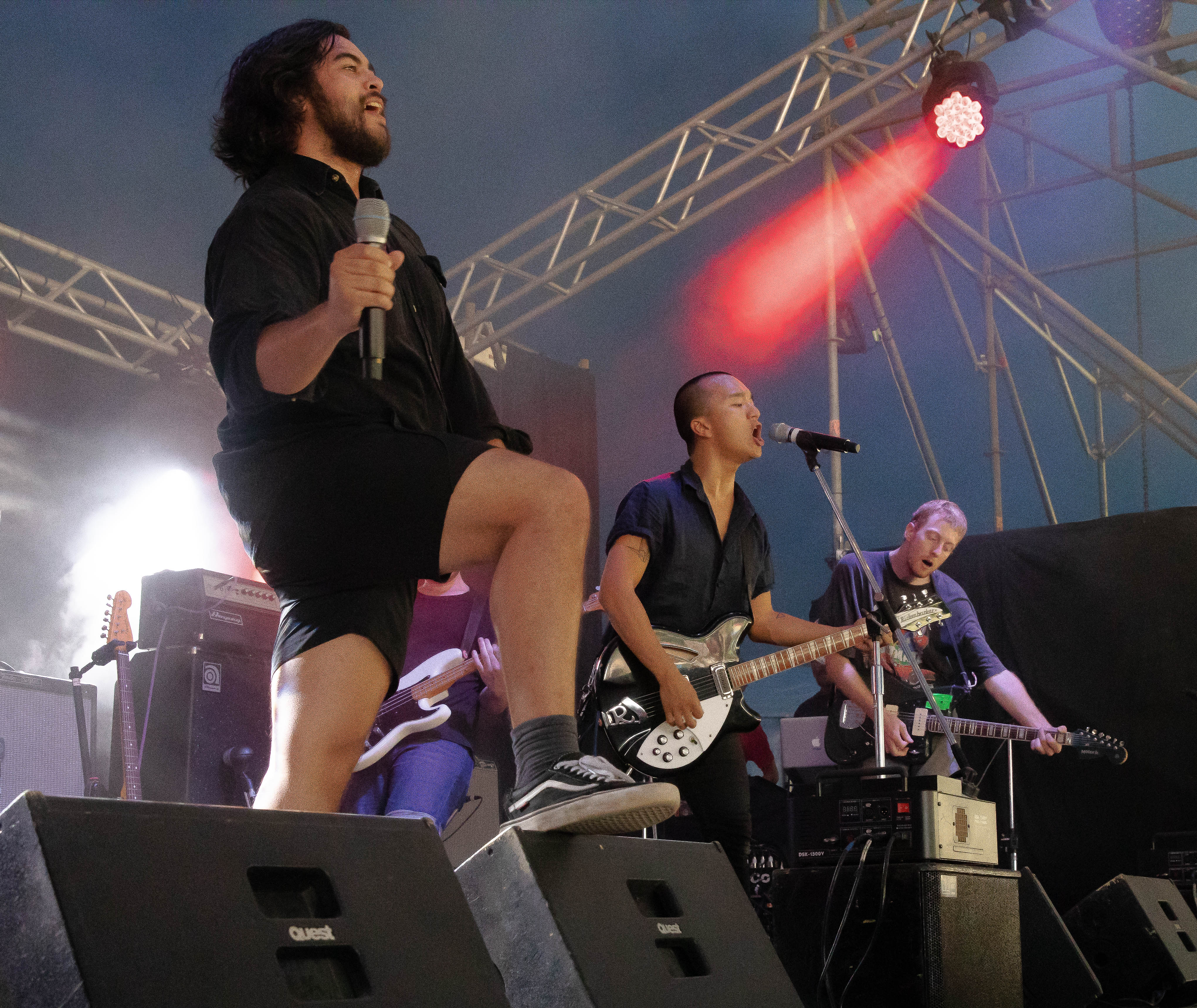

Background information
- Origin: Adelaide, Australia
- Genre: Pub rock, Garage punk
- Years active: 2013–present
- Label: Domestic La La
- Members: Josh Healey; Tom Gordon; Caitlin Thomas; Nick Horvat; Ray Dalfsen; Brian Bolado
- Past members: Josh Battersby; Hugh Black; Will Spooner-Adey; Alex Christophel
- Website: www.westthebarton.com

West Thebarton, previously known as West Thebarton Brothel Party, is an Australian rock band from Adelaide.

== History ==
West Thebarton cut their teeth practising in a studio in West Thebarton Road, in the western Adelaide suburb of Thebarton, hence the name of the band.

They released their debut album Different Beings Being Different in 2018.

In April 2023, they released "George Michael", the lead single from the upcoming EP Victory.

== Members ==
Current members

- Ray Dalfsen – lead vocals, guitar (2013–present)
- Josh Healey – guitar, backing vocals (2013–present)
- Tom Gordon – guitar, backing vocals (2013–present)
- Brian Bolado – guitar, percussion, backing vocals (2013–present)
- Nick Horvat – bass (2015–present)
- Caitlin Thomas – drums (2017–present)

Former members

- Josh Battersby – guitar (2013–2023)
- Hugh Black – drums (2015–2017)
- Will Spooner-Adey – bass (2013–2015)
- Alex Christophel – drums (2013–2015)

== Discography ==
=== Studio albums ===
Title	Album details	Peak chart positions
Title	Album details	AUS
Different Beings Being Different	Release date: 18 May 2018; Label: Domestic La La (DLL003); Formats: CD, digital download, LP streaming	45
Mongrel Australia	Scheduled: 22 March 2024; Label: Domestic La La; Formats: CD, digital download, LP, streaming	TBA

=== Live albums ===
Title	Album details
Live at the Exeter	Release date: 2015; Label: Rad Jams Exchange (RAD-001); Formats: Cassette

=== Extended plays ===
Title	EP details
West Thebarton Brothel Party	Release date: 30 July 2015; Label: Mirador Records (MIRAR0010); Formats: CD, digital downtown, LP, streaming
Victory	Scheduled date: 2 June 2023; Label: Formats: streaming

=== Singles ===
Title	Year	Album
"Red or White"	2016	non album single
"Moving Out"	2017	Different Beings Being Different
"Dolewave"	2017	non album single
"Bible Camp"	2017	Different Beings Being Different
"You've Got the Love" (Triple J Like a Version)	2018	Like a Version
"Tops"	2019	TBA
"George Michael"	2023	Victory
"Desire"	2023	Mongrel Australia
"Humble Heart"	2024	Mongrel Australia
"Tapes"	2024	Mongrel Australia

== Awards and nominations ==
=== AIR Awards ===
The Australian Independent Record Awards (commonly known informally as AIR Awards) is an annual awards night to recognise, promote and celebrate the success of Australia's Independent Music sector.

Year	Nominee / work	Award	Result	Ref.
2019	Different Beings Being Different	Best Independent Hard Rock, Heavy or Punk Album	Nominated	

=== ARIA Music Awards ===
The ARIA Music Awards are a set of annual ceremonies presented by Australian Recording Industry Association (ARIA), which recognise excellence, innovation, and achievement across all genres of the music of Australia. They commenced in 1987.

Year	Nominee / work	Award	Result	Ref.
2018	Different Beings Being Different	Best Hard Rock/Heavy Metal Album	Nominated	

=== National Live Music Awards ===
The National Live Music Awards (NLMAs) commenced in 2016 to recognize contributions to the live music industry in Australia.

Year	Nominee / work	Award	Result	Ref.
2018	West Thebarton	Live Act of the Year	Nominated	
2018	West Thebarton	International Live Achievement (Band)	Nominated	
2018	West Thebarton	South Australian Live Act of the Year	Won	
2020	themselves	South Australian Live Act of the Year	Nominated	
2023	Themselves	Best Live Act in SA	Nominated	

=== South Australian Music Awards ===
The South Australian Music Awards (SAM Awards) exist to recognise, promote and celebrate excellence in the South Australian contemporary music industry and take place annually in Adelaide, South Australia every November.

Year	Nominee / work	Award	Result	Ref.
2018	themselves	Best Group	Won	
2018	Different Beings Being Different	Best Release	Won	
2018	"Bible Camp"	Best Song	Won	
2018	themselves	People's Choice Rock Award	Won	
