= Glory (Teen Jesus and the Jean Teasers album) =

2025 studio album

Studio album by Teen Jesus and the Jean Teasers
- Released: 7 November 2025
- Length: 29:16
- Label: Community Music
- Producer: Catherine Marks

Teen Jesus and the Jean Teasers chronology
I Love You (2023)	Glory (2025)

Singles from Glory
- 1. "Balcony" Released: 25 April 2025; 2. "Unscarred" Released: 27 June 2025; 3. "Mother" Released: 27 August 2025; 4. "Bait" Released: 15 October 2025; 5. "Wonderful" Released: 7 November 2025

Singles from Glory (Deluxe)
- 1. "Bath Water" Released: 31 March 2026; 2. "Go Waste My Time" Released: 24 April 2026

Glory is the second studio album by Australian rock band Teen Jesus and the Jean Teasers. It was announced on 27 August 2025, alongside single "Mother" and was released on 7 November 2025. Upon announcement, the album was described as "an exploration of confidence, disgust, infatuation, and power set against indie rock you can strut to."

The album was promoted with release events in Melbourne, Sydney and Canberra over 7–9 November 2025.

The album will be supported by the eight-date Australian and New Zealand Glory Album Tour in May 2026. A deluxe edition was released on 24 April 2026, with its lead single "Bathwater" on 31 March 2026.

At the AIR Awards of 2026, it was nominated for Best Independent Rock Album or EP. At the 2026 ARIA Music Awards it was nominated for Best Group and Best Rock Album.

== Critical reception ==
Sian Cain from The Guardian said "Glory sounds a lot grander than anything they've done before; as punchy and contagious as the best of I Love You, but with a darker, synthy sound."

Fem Music felt that "Glory captures a band fully in command of their identity. (Producer Catherine) Marks and the band spent five intensive weeks at a remote studio in New South Wales perfecting their vision — experimenting freely, throwing out what didn't fit, and arriving at the truest version of their sound."

Mary Varvaris from The Music said "Glory is an album brimming with empowering energy that explores themes of infatuation, disgust and self-acceptance. Musically, the songs are widescreen indie-rock you can strut to, sing along to and cry to. It proudly captures messy nights out, mascara smeared, and a phone battery on 1%. It's eye rolls and Cher Horowitz-level sass."

Paul Cashmore from Noise11 called it their "most self-assured, emotionally charged and musically adventurous work to date."

== Track listing ==
Glory track listing
No.	Title	Length
1.	"Watching Me Leave"	2:29
2.	"Balcony"	3:25
3.	"Turn Around"	2:11
4.	"Talking"	2:44
5.	"Daylight"	3:31
6.	"Mine"	2:10
7.	"Mother"	4:05
8.	"Bait"	2:12
9.	"Unscarred"	3:01
10.	"Wonderful"	3:22
Total length:		29:16

Glory (Deluxe) track listing
No.	Title	Length
1.	"Bath Water"	2:29
2.	"Go Waste My Time"	2:55
3.	"Talking" (stripped back)	3:32
4.	"Daylight" (stripped back)	3:55
5.	"Mine" (stripped back)	2:33
6.	"Wonderful" (stripped back)	3:43

== Charts ==
Chart performance for Glory
Chart (2025)	Peak position
Australian Albums (ARIA)	9
