= Dear Seattle =

Australian indie rock band

- Origin: Sydney, Australia
- Genres: Indie rock; garage rock
- Years active: 2013–present
- Labels: Domestic La La
- Members: Brae Fisher; Jeremy Baker; Lachlan Simpson; Lewis Armstrong
- Past members: Josh Williams; Samuel Bauermeister; Josh McKay; Nick Crameri

Dear Seattle are an Australian indie rock band from the Northern Beaches of Sydney, New South Wales. The band consists of four members: Brae Fisher, Jeremy Baker, Lachlan Simpson and Lewis Armstrong. They have released three studio albums and two EPs to date.

The band have performed at many Australian festivals including; Groovin the Moo, Unify Gathering, Festival of the Sun, and Party in the Paddock.

== History ==
Dear Seattle's formed in Sydney in 2013 and band began posting songs on Triple J's Unearthed, which gained them rotation across the Triple J network. In February 2019, the band released their debut studio album Don't Let Go, which was produced by James Tidswell (Violent Soho).

In 2019, Dear Seattle covered Missy Higgins "The Special Two" for Triple J's Like a Version.

== Members ==
Current members

- Brae Fisher – lead vocals (2015–present), rhythm guitar (2013–present), backing vocals (2013–2015)
- Lachlan Simpson – lead guitar, backing vocals (2013–present)
- Jeremy Baker – bass, backing vocals (2014–present)
- Lewis Armstrong – drums (2024–present)

Former members

- Josh Williams – bass (2013–2014)
- Samuel Bauermeister – lead vocals (2013–2015)
- Josh McKay – drums (2013–2023)
- Nick Crameri – drums (2024)

== Discography ==
=== Albums ===
Title	Details	Peak chart positions
Title	Details	AUS
Don't Let Go	Released: 15 February 2019; Label: Domestic La La (DLL005CD); Format: CD, DD, streaming	45
Someday	Released: 2 September 2022; Label: Domestic La La; Formats: CD, LP, DD, streaming	31
Toy	Released: 17 January 2025; Label: Domestic La La; Formats: CD, LP, DD, streaming	4

=== EPs ===
Title	Details
Words Are Often Useless	Released: 17 April 2013; Label: Dear Seattle; Format: Digital download
Dear Seattle	Released: 14 July 2017; Label: Domestic La La; Format: CD, digital download, streaming

=== Singles ===
Title	Year	Album
"Our Agreement"	2013	Words Are Often Useless
"Momentarily"	2015	Non-album single
"The Meadows"	2016	Dear Seattle
"Afterthought"	2017	Dear Seattle
"Maybe"	2018	Don't Let Go
"Daytime TV"	2019	Don't Let Go
"Try"	2019	Don't Let Go
"The Special Two" (Triple J Like a Version)	2019	Like a Version
"In My Head"	2021	Someday
"Way Out"	2021	Someday
"Nothing's Stopping Me Now"	2023	Toy
"idc"	2023	Toy
"Sungazer"	2024	Toy
"Evergreen"	2024	Toy
"Say What You Want"	2024	Toy
"Counting Hours"	2024	Toy

== Awards ==
=== AIR Awards ===
The Australian Independent Record Awards (commonly known informally as AIR Awards) is an annual awards night to recognise, promote and celebrate the success of Australia's Independent Music sector.

Year	Nominee / work	Award	Result
2020	Don't Let Go	Best Independent Punk Album or EP	Nominated
