= Teenage Joans =

Australian indie rock duo

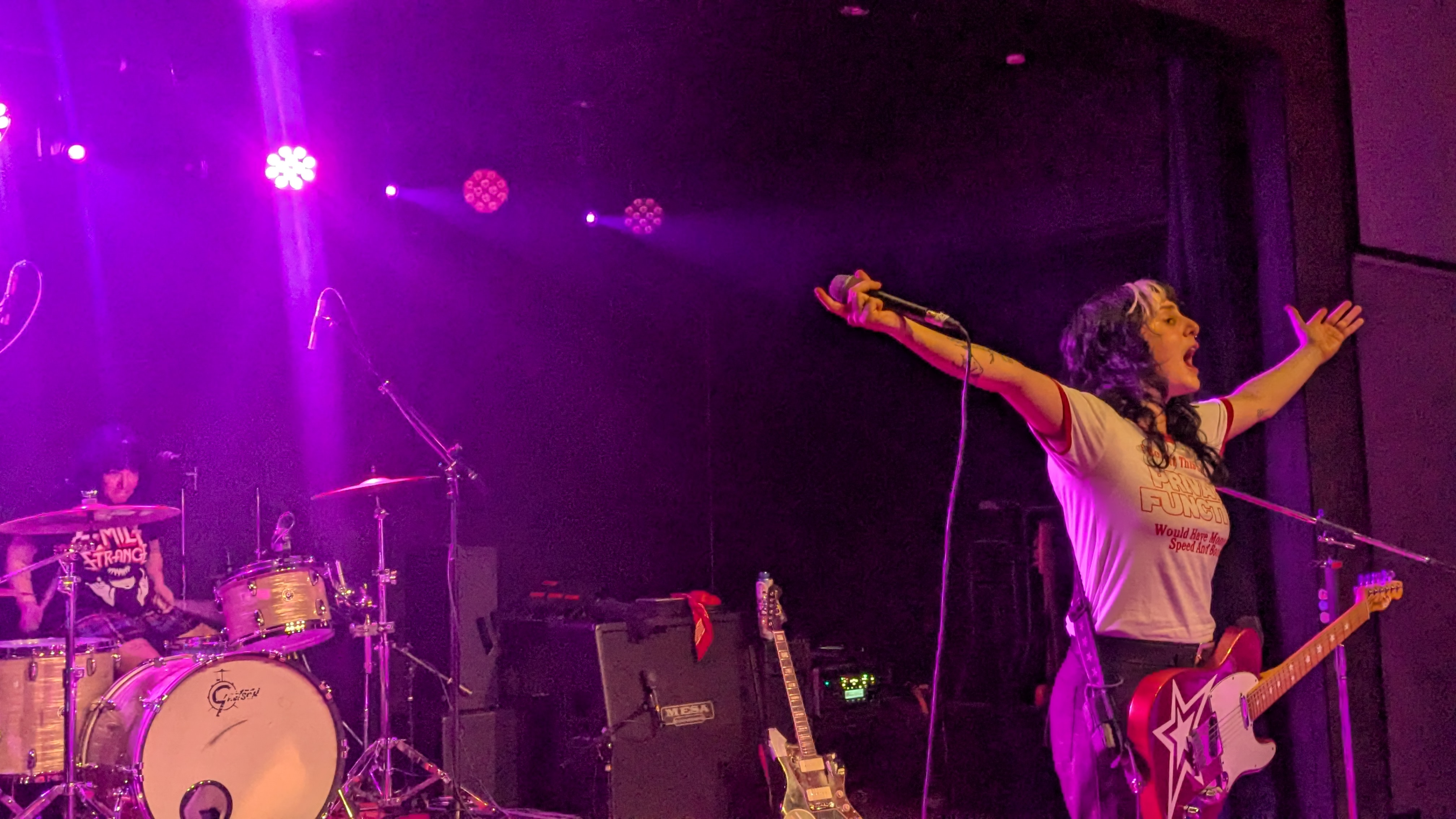

Background information
- Origin: Adelaide, South Australia, Australia
- Genres: Indie rock; pop; punk rock; rock
- Years active: 2018–present
- Labels: Domestic La La; Juicebox Records (independent); Teenage Joans
- Members: Tahlia Borg; Cahli Blakers
- Website: www.teenagejoans.com.au

Teenage Joans are an Australian indie rock and punk rock duo from Adelaide, South Australia, who formed in 2018. The duo consists of vocalist and drummer Tahlia Borg and vocalist and guitarist Cahli Blakers.

The duo rose to prominence with their debut single "By the Way". Their second single, "Three Leaf Clover", was released in March 2020 and became the winning song of Triple J's 2020 Unearthed High competition. Their debut extended play, Taste of Me, was released on 28 May 2021. They released their debut studio album, The Rot That Grows Inside My Chest, in October 2023, and an accompanying short film in 2024.

The duo have been the recipients of multiple awards, winning South Australian Live Act of the Year at the 2019 National Live Music Awards, and six awards at the 2021 South Australian Music Awards, including Best Group, Best New Artist, Best Punk Artist, Best Release (for Taste of Me), Best Cover Art and Best Song (for "Something About Being Sixteen").

== Career ==
=== 2018–2020: Formation and "By the Way" ===
The pair met in 2018 when introduced by a mutual friend at Northern Sound System when Blakers was searching for a band-mate. At the time of their music releasing, Borg attended Gleeson College, making the band eligible for the Unearthed High competition, which they went on to win. They performed at Laneway Festival and A Day of Clarity in 2019.

=== 2021–2022: Taste of Me ===
On 14 January 2021, Teenage Joans released "Something About Being Sixteen", the lead single from their debut extended play. On 26 March, the duo released the single "Ice Cream", and announced their forthcoming debut EP, Taste of Me. On 27 May, they released the single "Wine". Taste of Me was released on 28 May 2021. Taste of Me received positive reviews, and was included in Australian music publication The Music's mid-year list of their top 25 albums of the year to date. On 19 November, the duo were announced as the recipients of seven awards at the 2021 South Australian Music Awards. On 6 March 2022, the duo were announced to support Foo Fighters alongside the Chats on the Australian leg of their upcoming tour, before all tour dates were cancelled following the death of Foo Fighters drummer Taylor Hawkins. On 29 April, they release the single "Terrible" and announced that they had signed to record label Domestic La La, run by James Tidswell of Violent Soho.

=== 2023–present: The Rot That Grows Inside My Chest ===
On 2 May 2023, Teenage Joans returned with their first new song since early 2022. "Superglue" was released alongside a music video, followed by "Candy Apple" on 10 August 2023. That same day, the band announced their debut studio album, The Rot That Grows Inside My Chest, would be releasing on 13 October 2023 as their first album release with Domestic La La.

In 2024, the band released their debut short film, a visual accompaniment for The Rot That Grows Inside My Chest. It was directed by Jamie Al Kayyali and stars the duo playing fictionalised versions of themselves. They held premiere screenings in Sydney, Melbourne, and Adelaide.

Teenage Joans are scheduled to play at new festival in the Adelaide suburb of Modbury, A Day in the Gully, on 28 February 2026, along with Ball Park Music, The Living End, Chet Faker, Pete Murray, and others.

== Artistry ==
=== Musical style and influences ===
Musically, Teenage Joans are an indie rock, pop, punk rock, and rock band, with the duo self-describing their sound as "juicebox punk-pop". They list Waax, Camp Cope, and Sophie Hopes of Tired Lion as musical influences. The duo have stated that they intend for their music to reflect a more modern take on the punk music made popular by Blink-182 and Thirty Seconds to Mars.

=== Songwriting and lyrical themes ===
Teenage Joans say their lyrics "feel nostalgic and feel like [something] you could consume as a young person, but also have a heavier kind of meaning that people can relate to," with frontwoman and guitarist Cahli Blakers stating that one of their favourite things to do when writing is "juxtaposing serious topics using childlike metaphors in order to get the point across in a different way."

== Band members ==
- Tahlia Borg (born 2002) – vocals, drums
- Cahli Blakers (born 2001) – vocals, guitar

== Discography ==
=== Studio albums ===
List of studio albums, with title, release date, label, formats, and selected chart positions shown
Title	Studio album details	Peak chart positions
Title	Studio album details	AUS
The Rot That Grows Inside My Chest	Released: 13 October 2023; Label: Domestic La La; Formats: CD, LP, digital download, streaming	59

=== Extended plays ===
List of studio albums, with title, release date, label, formats, and selected chart positions shown
Title	EP details	Peak chart positions
Title	EP details	AUS
Taste of Me	Released: 28 May 2021; Label: Teenage Joans; Formats: LP, digital download, streaming	— (Note: Taste of Me did not enter the ARIA Top 100 Albums Chart, but did peak at number 7 on the ARIA Top 20 Vinyl Albums Chart on 8 May 2023.)

=== Singles ===
List of singles, with title, year released, and album details shown
Title	Year	Album
"By the Way"	2019	Non-album singles
"Three Leaf Clover"	2020	Non-album singles
"Something About Being Sixteen"	2021	Taste of Me
"Ice Cream"	2021	Taste of Me
"Wine"	2021	Taste of Me
"Terrible"	2022	Non-album single
"Superglue"	2023	The Rot That Grows Inside My Chest
"Candy Apple"	2023	The Rot That Grows Inside My Chest
"5 Things I Can Taste"	2023	The Rot That Grows Inside My Chest
"Girl from the Record Shop" (with Frank Turner)	2024	Undefeated
"1800-Painless" (with Between You & Me)	2024	Non-album single
"Sweet and Slow"	2025	TBA
"My Heart's Dead"	2025	TBA
"Bandits"	2026	TBA
"Coming Up from Hell"	2026	TBA

== Filmography ==
- The Rot That Grows Inside My Chest: The Film (21 mins, 2024)

== Awards and nominations ==
The Teenage Joans were awarded a Robert Stigwood Fellowship, which provided mentorship and professional development, by the Music Development Office in SA.

=== AIR Awards ===
The Australian Independent Record Awards (commonly known informally as AIR Awards) is an annual awards night to recognise, promote and celebrate the success of Australia's Independent Music sector.

Year	Nominee / work	Award	Result	Ref.
2022	Teenage Joans	Breakthrough Independent Artist of the Year	Nominated	
2024	The Rot That Grows Inside My Chest	Best Independent Punk Album or EP	Nominated	
2024	Janine Morcos for Teenage Joans The Rot That Grows Inside My Chest	Independent Publicity Team of the Year	Nominated	

=== ARIA Music Awards ===
The ARIA Music Awards are a set of annual ceremonies presented by Australian Recording Industry Association (ARIA), which recognise excellence, innovation, and achievement across all genres of the music of Australia. They commenced in 1987.

Year	Nominee / work	Award	Result	Ref.
2024	The Rot That Grows Inside My Chest	Best Hard Rock/Heavy Metal Album	Nominated	

=== J Awards ===
The J Awards are an annual series of Australian music awards that were established by the Australian Broadcasting Corporation's youth-focused radio station Triple J. They commenced in 2005.

Year	Nominee / work	Award	Result	Ref.
2021	Themselves	Unearthed Artist of the Year	Nominated	

=== National Live Music Awards ===
The National Live Music Awards (NLMAs) commenced in 2016 to recognize contributions to the live music industry in Australia.

Year	Nominee / work	Award	Result	Ref.
2019	Themselves	South Australian Live Act of the Year	Won	
2023	Themselves	Best Live Act in SA	Nominated	

=== South Australian Music Awards ===
The South Australian Music Awards (previously known as the Fowler's Live Music Awards) are annual awards that exist to recognise, promote and celebrate excellence in the South Australian contemporary music industry. They commenced in 2012.

Year	Nominee / work	Award	Result (wins only)	Ref.
2021	Teenage Joans	Best Group	Won	
2021	Teenage Joans	Best New Artist	Won	
2021	Teenage Joans	Best Punk Artist	Won	
2021	Taste of Me	Best Release	Won	
2021	Taste of Me	Best Cover Art	Won	
2021	"Something About Being Sixteen"	Best Song	Won	
2021	Themselves	City of Adelaide Exceptional Live Performance Award	Won	
2024	Teenage Joans	Best Group	Won	

=== Triple J Unearthed High ===
Year	Nominee / work	Award	Result	Ref.
2020	Themselves	Unearthed High Competition	Won	
