= Germein =

Australian pop band

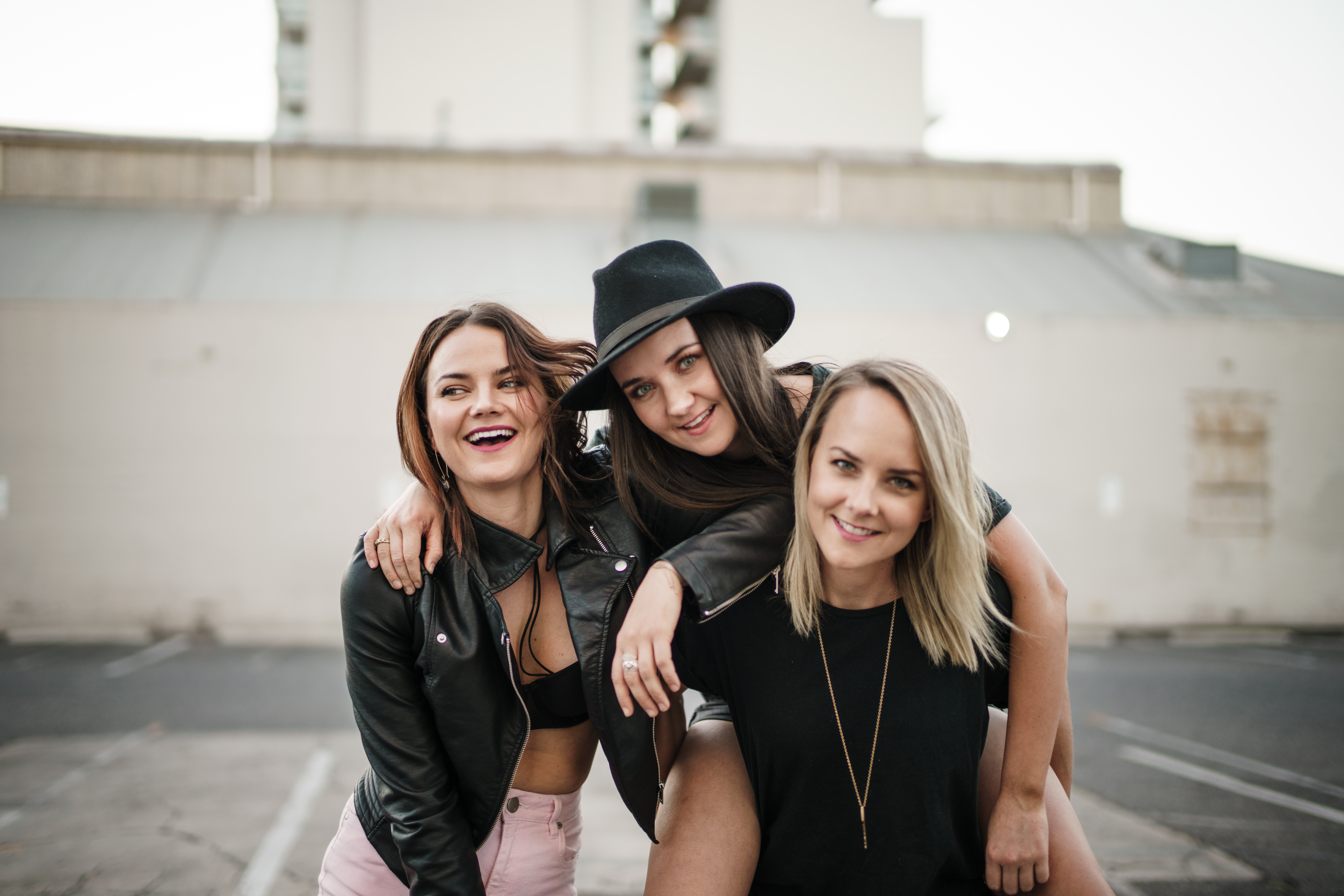

Germein is a pop band based in Adelaide, South Australia. Previously known as the Germein Sisters, its members are three siblings, Georgia Germein, Ella Germein, and Clara Germein.

They have toured Europe, China, New Zealand and Australia. Their 2013 debut album, Because You Breathe, was recorded in Ireland.

In 2018, the band played a 15-date stadium tour in the UK, supporting British group Little Mix on their Summer Hits Tour, performing to audiences of up to 35,000 people. That same year, they recorded the single "Knocking At My Door", as a follow-up to their previous track "Talking", which had received national airplay in Australia.

== Members ==
=== Georgia Germein ===
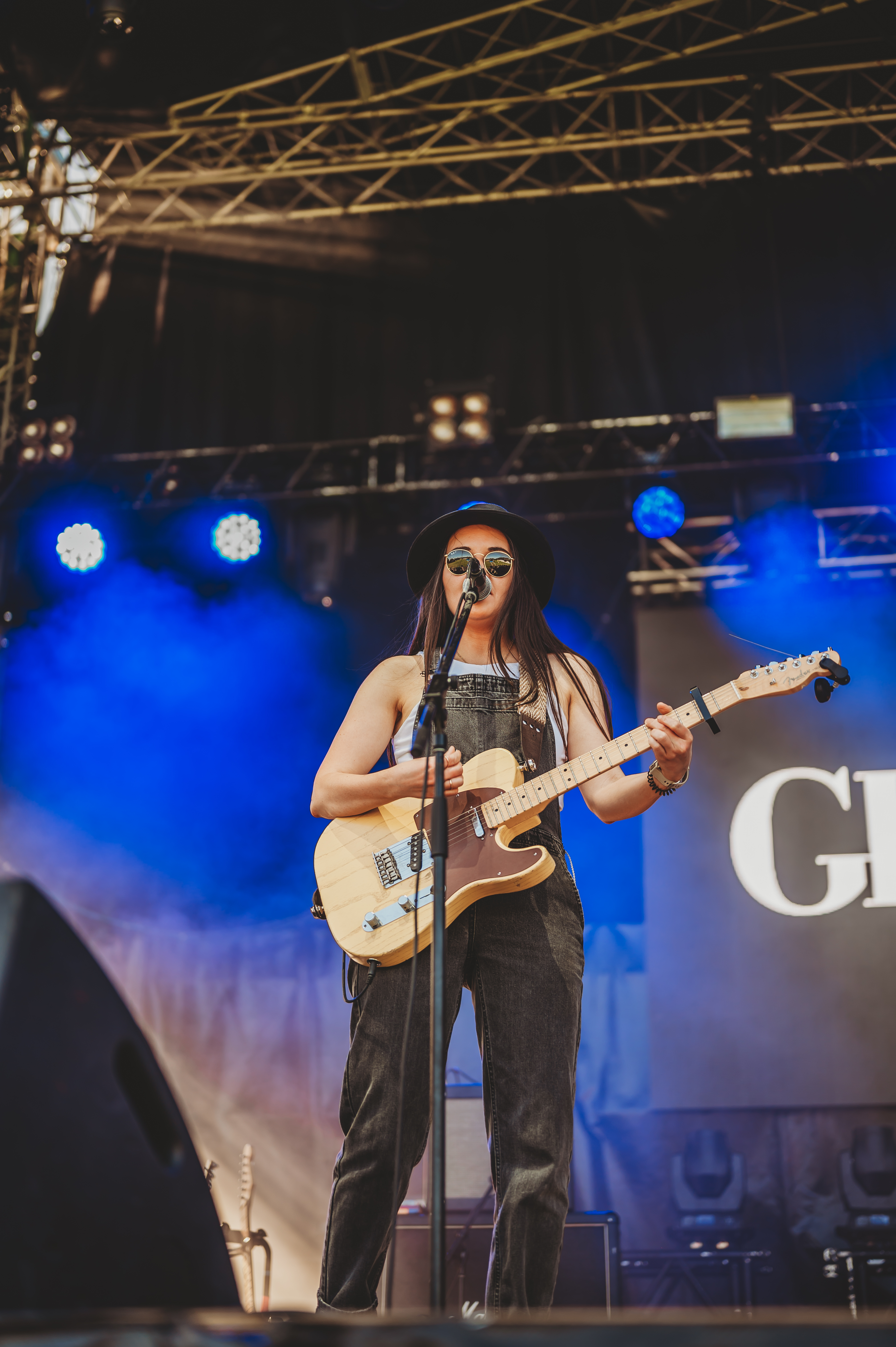
Georgia Germein on Guitar

Georgia Germein is an acoustic pop singer-songwriter. She performs solo (vocals, guitar/piano) as well as with her two sisters as the band Germein. Prior to the formation of the band, Georgia released a solo album, Take My Hand, in 2010.

Georgia grew up in the bush in the Adelaide Hills. She has undertaken various charitable activities including working in the Kalahari, South Africa, and Nepal, acting as a youth ambassador for World Vision in 2010. Georgia has been the recipient of awards including seven ASME Young Composers Awards. In 2007, she received the South Australian Premiers Award and achieved a semi-finalist status in the International Songwriting Competition. In 2009, she was announced as the National winner of the Young Bloods Radio Competition for Nova.

=== Ella Germein ===
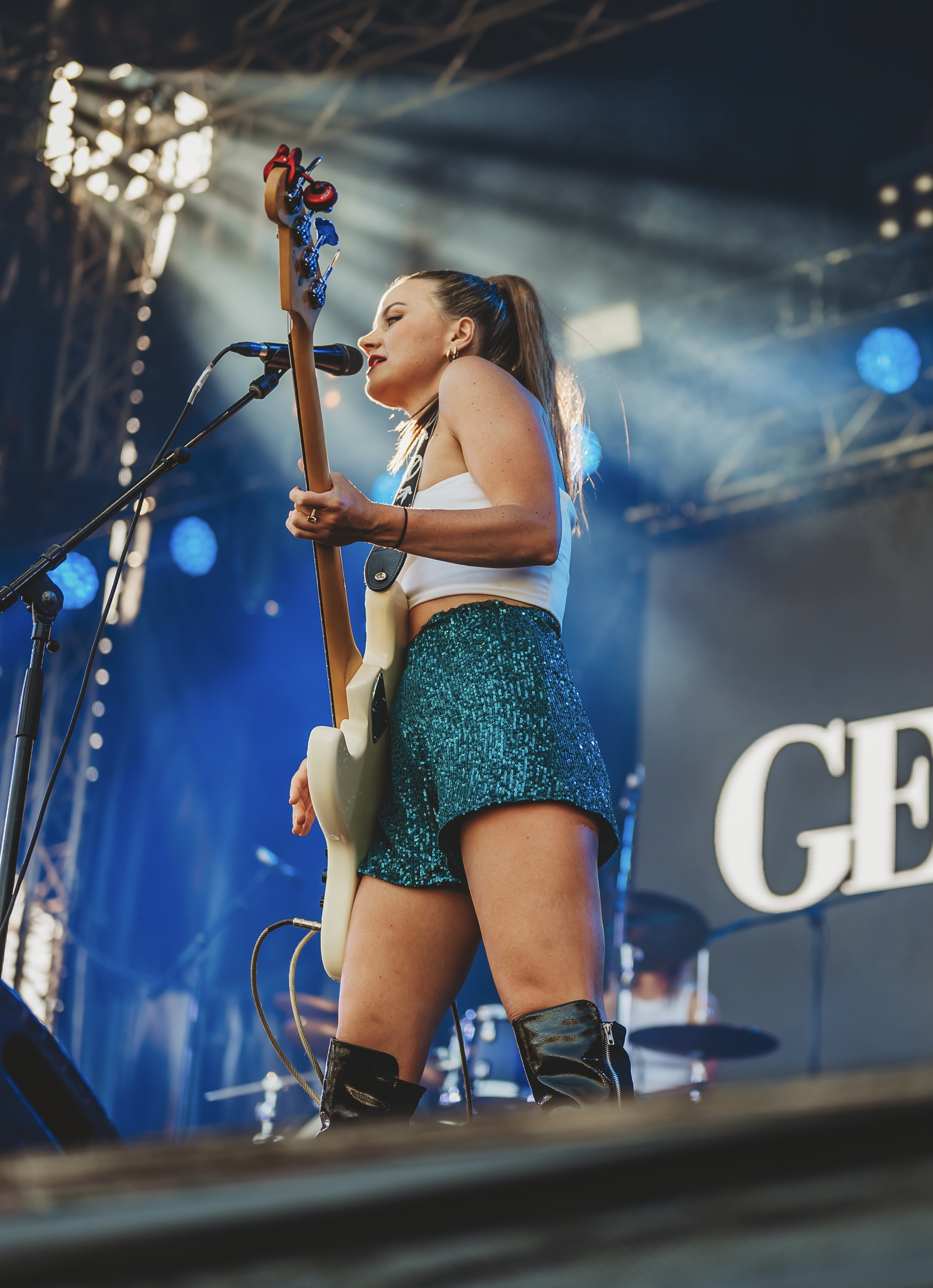

Ella Germain plays bass, electric cello, and sings backing vocals with the band. She studied and works in the media arts and communications field, including television presentation.

=== Clara Germein ===
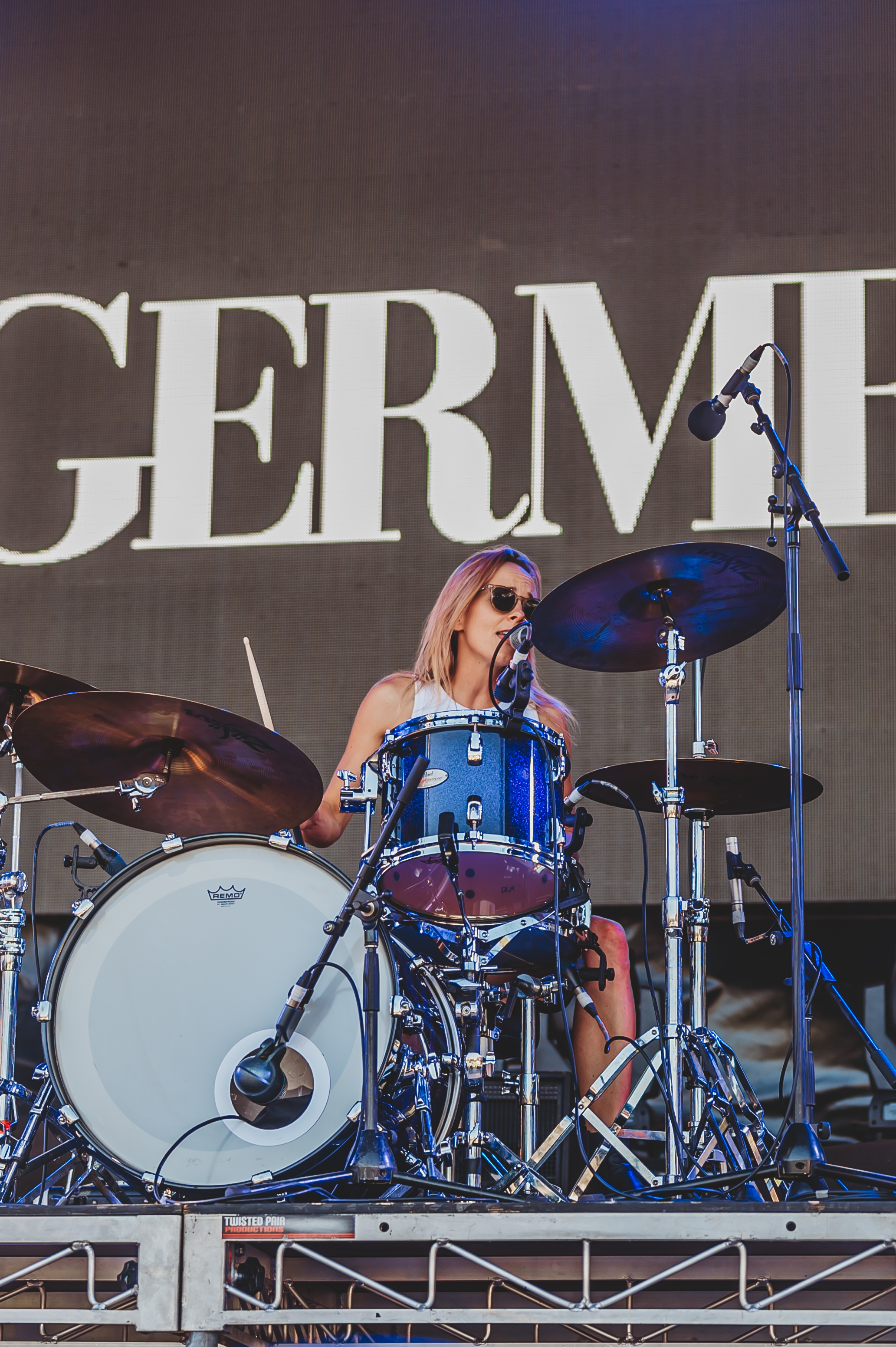
Clara Germein

Clara Germein plays drums with the band.

== Discography ==
=== Studio albums ===
Title	Details
Because You Breathe	Released: 6 September 2013; Label: Germein / MGM Distribution (GG20913); Formats: CD, Digital Download
Germein	Released: 2019; Label: Germein / MGM Distribution (GSG2019); Formats: CD, Digital Download, streaming

== Awards ==
=== South Australian Music Awards ===
The South Australian Music Awards (previously known as the Fowler's Live Music Awards) are annual awards that exist to recognise, promote and celebrate excellence in the South Australian contemporary music industry. They commenced in 2012.

Year	Nominee / work	Award	Result (wins only)
2019	Germein	People's Choice Pop Award	Won
2020	Germein	People's Choice Pop Award	Won
