= DyspOra =

- Born: Gabriel Akon c. 1994; Wau, South Sudan
- Occupations: Rapper; poet; activist
- Years active: 2012–present
- Musical career
- Genres: Hip hop
- Instrument: Vocals
- Label: Playback 808

Gabriel Erjok Majer Akon (born c. 1994), known professionally as DyspOra (pronounced "die-spora"), is a South Sudanese-born Australian rapper and activist. He is the founder of the music collective and independent record label Playback 808, and released the 8-track EP, The AustrAlien, in partnership with the not-for-profit organisation Music in Exile in April 2020, after a series of singles and shorter collaborations. He calls his brand of hip hop "Sonic Activism", as he uses his music as a tool to influence social change.

== Early life ==
Born around 1994 as Gabriel Erjok Majer Akon, he spent his first seven years living in Kakuma refugee camp in Kenya, before migrating to South Australia as a 10-year-old with his family in 2004. Attending school in Adelaide, he wrote poetry, and soon became a socially-conscious rapper called DyspOra.

== Career ==
Akon established Playback808 as an independent hip hop collective in 2011 and later (around 2017) as a record label.

Akon attracted national attention in 2017 after performing his song "Open Road" with Elsy Wameyo live on Tonightly with Tom Ballard on ABC TV. He has performed at many major music festivals and events. He challenges racism in Australian society and the music business. He cites the music and leadership of Bob Marley and Fela Kuti as sources of inspiration, saying that had he not listened to them, he may have chosen a legal or medical career.

In January 2019 Akon released "The One Freestyle", in which he takes aim at Australian police and the vilification of Sudanese people in Australia. He thinks that racism, as something which he and his loved ones experience constantly, is not being addressed with enough urgency in Australia, and believes in the power of music to influence people.

On 17 April 2020, Akon released his first EP, The AustrAlien, on all platforms, after a preview on Triple J. The 8-track mini-album was produced in partnership with the not-for-profit organisation Music in Exile (which showcases refugee and migrant artists), and features Elsy Wameyo, Lord Levi, NeSs and producers from Playback 808.

"When I succeed I am Australian, but when I fail I am African", he said as he announced its release. "It’s about wanting to belong, but still feeling alienated... I call them, 'Australiens'. They are the ones that want to be Australian, but they get treated like aliens, so they're somehow on the fringes. They are the biggest potential this country could ever have because of what they could add to this country. All the nation has to do is invest in them".

== Community work and activism ==
Akon calls his brand of hip hop "Sonic Activism", as he uses his music as a tool to influence social change. He has given TEDx Youth talks at universities and is a big believer in giving back, and is regarded as one of the most influential hip hop artists in South Australia empowering young people through his music.

His community work includes giving his time to helping disadvantaged young people in the northern suburbs of Adelaide, running weekly music sessions for up to 70 people at Northern Sound System in Elizabeth. With the live sessions interrupted by the COVID-19 pandemic in Australia, Akon helped to supply the young musicians with microphones, and has kept in touch using Zoom video chat. He has proven an inspiration to young artists such as Kaye Lou and Phylo.

He is an ambassador for the Timpir Foundation, an organisation he founded himself to provide education to more than 1,400 children in South Sudan and in refugee camps in Kenya.

Akon addressed the crowd at the Black Lives Matter protest in Adelaide on 6 June 2020, saying that he stood with Indigenous Australians in their fight against racism and injustice.

== Discography ==
=== Extended plays ===
Title	Details
AustrAlien	Released: April 2020; Label: Music in Exile; Format: DD, streaming

=== Singles ===
Year	Title	Album
"Blood of My Blood (B.O.M.B.)"	2018	AustrAlien
"Open Wide" (featuring Elsy Wameyo)	2018	AustrAlien
"808 Star"	2019	AustrAlien
"AustrAlien"	2020	AustrAlien

== Recognition and awards ==
The South Australian Music Awards (previously known as the Fowler's Live Music Awards) are annual awards that exist to recognise, promote and celebrate excellence in the South Australian contemporary music industry. They commenced in 2012. DyspOra won Best Male Artist in 2017.

Akon received the Youth Award for 2018 at the Governor's Multicultural Awards in South Australia in 2019, for his "outstanding youth and community work for the local and international community".

Akon was a state finalist in the 2020 Young Australian of the Year awards and was also nominated for the Channel 7 Young Achievers awards in the same year.
