= Teen Jesus and the Jean Teasers =

Australian rock band

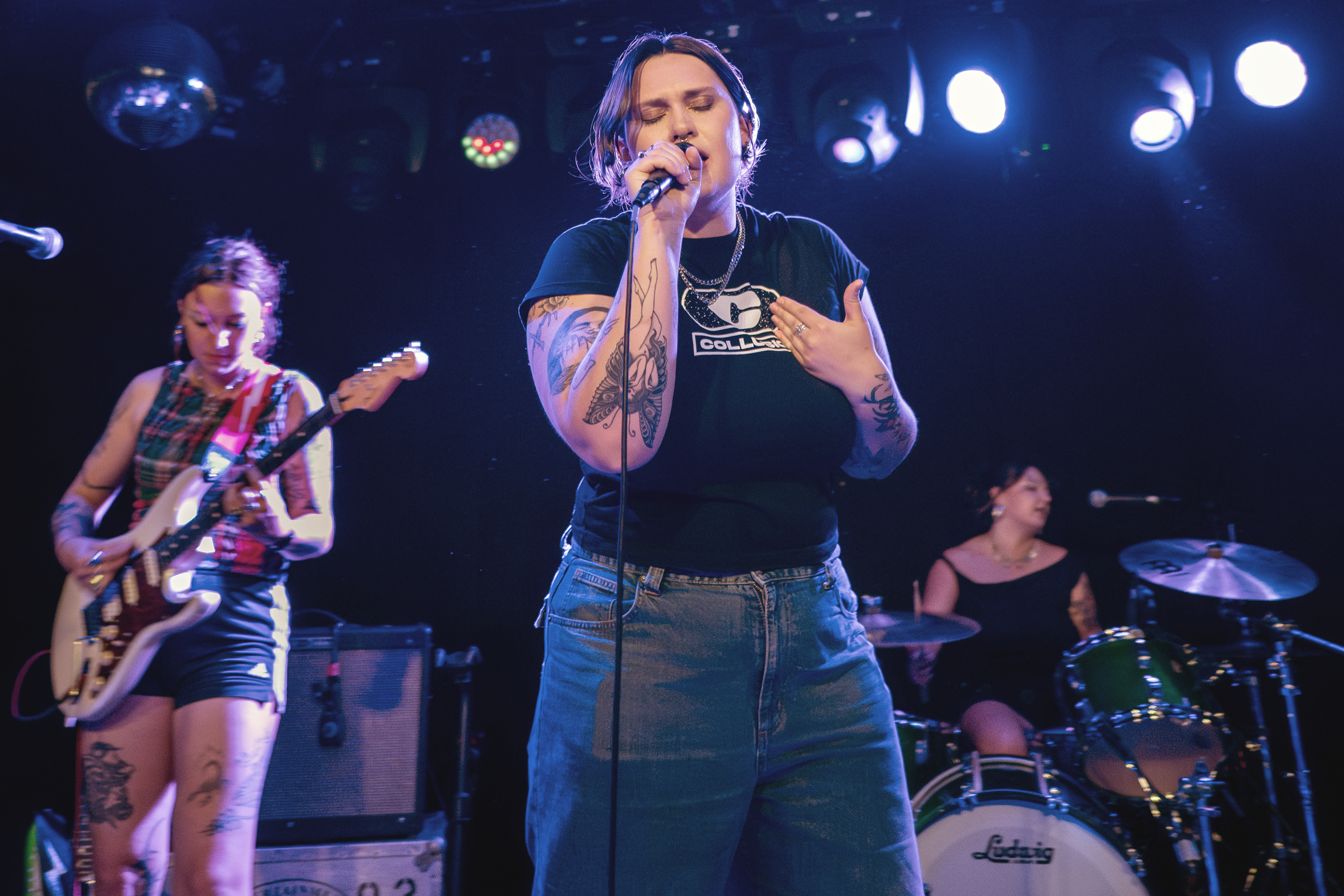
- Teen Jesus and the Jean Teasers performing in Los Angeles, 2025

Background information
- Origin: Canberra, Australia
- Genres: Riot grrrl; punk rock; post-grunge
- Years active: 2015–present
- Label: Domestic La La
- Members: Anna Ryan; Neve van Boxsel; Scarlett McKahey; Jaida Stephenson
- Past members: Pip Gazard
- Website: www.teenjesusandthejeanteasers.net

Teen Jesus and the Jean Teasers are an Australian rock band formed in Canberra in 2015. The group consists of vocalist Anna Ryan, guitarist Scarlett McKahey, drummer Neve van Boxsel, and bassist Jaida Stephenson. Their debut extended play, Pretty Good for a Girl Band, was released in 2022 through Domestic La La and won Best Independent Punk Album or EP at the 2023 AIR Awards. Their debut full-length album, I Love You, was released in 2023 and peaked at number 6 on the ARIA Albums Chart. Their most recent album, Glory, was released in November 2025.

== History ==
=== 2015–2020: Formation and early releases ===
The band was formed in July 2015 when all five original members – singer Anna Ryan, guitarist Scarlett McKahey, drummer Neve van Boxsel, keyboardist Pip Gazard, and bassist Jaida Stephenson – were 15-year-old students at the Orana Steiner School in Weston, a suburb of Canberra. Some of the band members also came from Wollongong and Melbourne. Van Boxsel had been playing drums since she was 10; Ryan had been singing for all their childhood; and McKahey had started on cello at a young age. The band was originally called Vinyl Fluid, then Dandelion and the Enigmas; their current name was coined by McKahey's uncle.

In June 2019, the band released "I Like That You Like That", and were named as a Triple J Unearthed feature artist. The same year, they performed at the Australian festivals Bigsound, Groovin' the Moo, the Laneway Festival, and the Falls Festival; among other touring.

In February 2020, the single "Desk Chair" was released, with Hayden Davies of the music publication Pilerats praising it for being "gritty and rough-around-the-edges in the most charming of ways."

=== 2021–2022: Pretty Good for a Girl Band ===
The band signed with Domestic La La in 2021. Their first single with the label, "Ahhhh!", was released in July of that year. In the Triple J Hottest 200 of 2021, the song made it to number 117. In May 2021, the band performed at a number of festivals in the United Kingdom. The single "Miss Your Birthday", co-written by Alex Lahey, was released in November 2021.

Their debut EP Pretty Good for a Girl Band was released in May 2022. The single "Girl Sports", was described by Ellie Robinson from NME as a "notedly darker cut for the Canberra-native quartet" featuring "more grisly guitar runs, snappy, cymbal-heavy drums and cutthroat lead vocals." The band embarked on a nationwide Australian tour supporting the EP in August 2022.

=== 2023–2024: I Love You ===
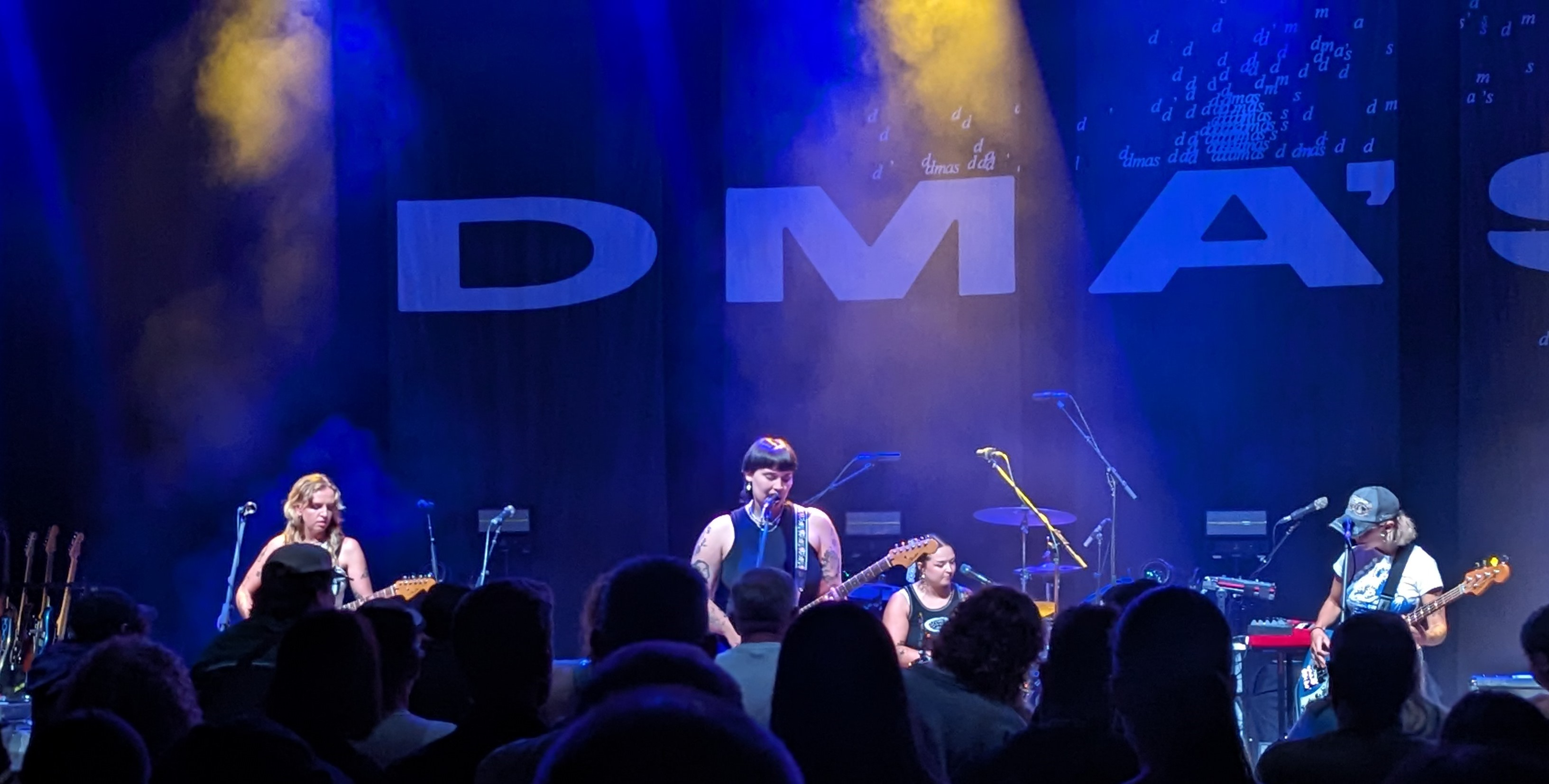
Teen Jesus and the Jean Teasers opening for the DMA's in Wodonga, October 2023.

In March 2023, the band released the song "Lights Out". "Never Saw It Coming" followed in June. Those two songs were previews of the band's first full-length album, I Love You, which was released in October 2023. An expanded version of the album called I Love You Too was released in September 2024.

The band opened for Foo Fighters in Australia in Fall 2023. Shortly before the release of I Love You, guitarist Scarlett McKahey announced a hiatus from touring due to postural orthostatic tachycardia syndrome, and Meg Holland filled in during live shows. McKahey later returned to touring and Holland remained as rhythm guitarist during live shows. The band was invited to serve as the opening act for Pearl Jam during an American tour in Spring 2025.

=== 2025–present: Neve solo EP, Tour with Pearl Jam, and Glory ===
On 26 February 2025, Neve released her debut solo song titled "Bones", along with "Someone Everyone Wants to Know" on 26 March as a precursor to her solo debut EP Playgirl, released on 28 March. The EP also contained the songs "Playgirl" and "Coming Home". The EP has a stripped back, raw, honest, and softer feel in comparison to the band's sound; she wrote, recorded, and produced the entire EP herself in her bedroom.

Across May 2025, Teen Jesus and the Jean Teasers served as the opening act for Pearl Jam on the continuation of their Dark Matter tour in the United States, playing in Nashville, Raleigh, and Pittsburgh. Whilst in North America, the band performed headlining shows in New York, Toronto, and Los Angeles.

On 23 April 2025, the band released "Balcony" as a single with an accompanying music video. A second studio album, Glory, was released on 7 November 2025.

== Artistry ==
The band cites the riot grrrl movement as well as Cherry Glazerr, Dream Wife, and WAAX as their biggest influences. Anna Ryan, the bands lead vocalist, has said the intention in their lyrics are intended "to create music that is relatable and meaningful" to "women especially". The band's lyrics have often alluded to events that have impacted their lives – "Girl Sports" is specifically written about a comment made by Stephenson's male dentist to "stick to girl sports", and their debut EP's title is derived from remarks made by some listeners' surprise at the band's ability.

== Band members ==
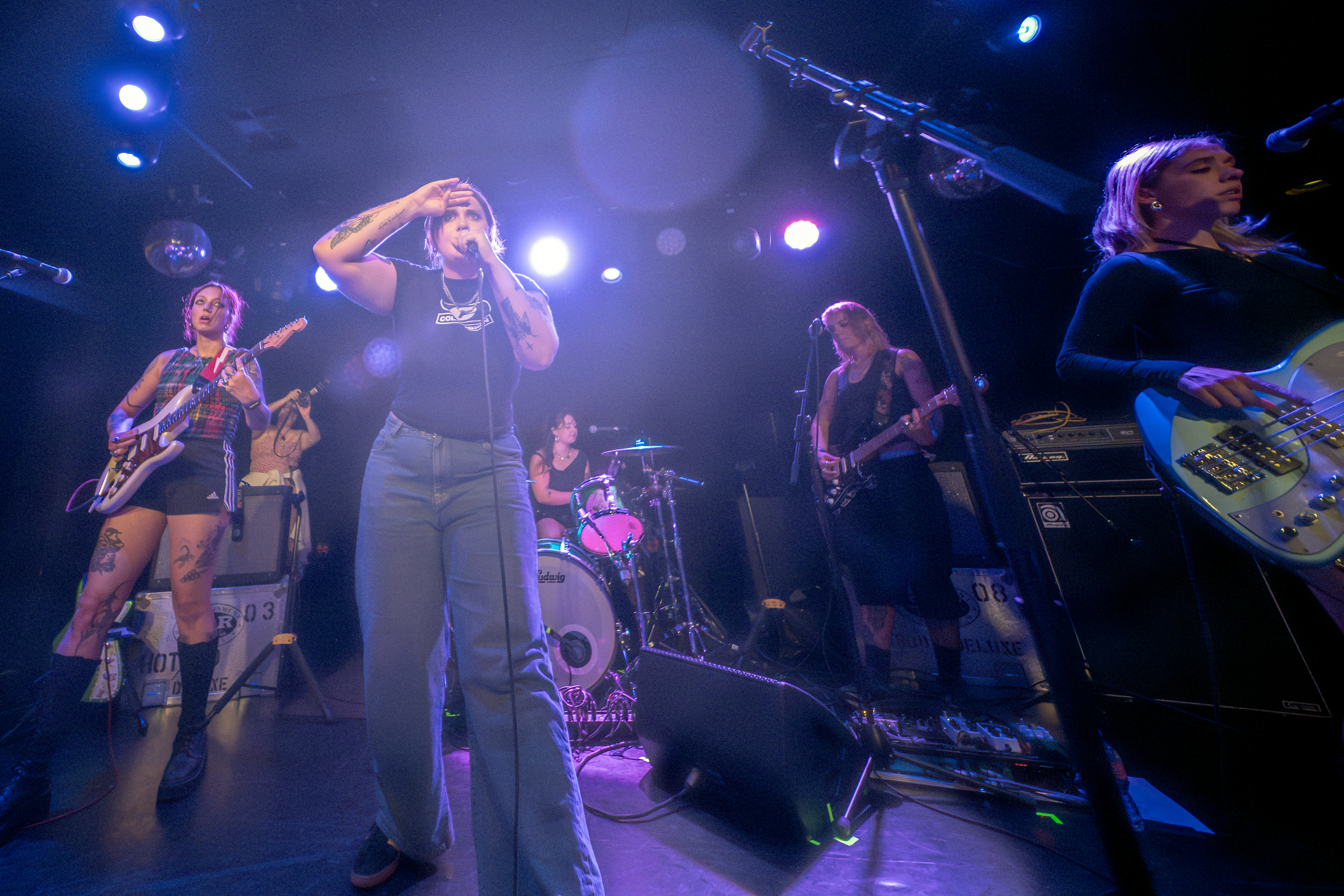
From left: McKahey, Ryan, van Boxsel, Holland and Stephenson, performing in 2025.

Current members

- Anna Ryan – lead vocals, rhythm guitar (2015–present)
- Scarlett McKahey – lead guitar, backing and occasional lead vocals (2015–present) (Note: In August 2023, McKahey announced she would be stepping back from performing live due to her diagnosis with postural orthostatic tachycardia syndrome. She remained a band member, however, and returned to full-time touring a year later.)
- Neve van Boxsel – drums, backing and occasional lead vocals, acoustic guitar (2015–present)
- Jaida Stephenson – bass guitar, backing vocals (2015–present)

Current touring musicians

- Meg Holland – rhythm guitar, backing vocals (2023, 2024–present), lead guitar (2023–2024) (Note: Holland fulfilled lead guitar duties when McKahey was not performing live with the band, but has otherwise played Ryan's rhythm guitar parts. As such, Ryan has largely not played guitar live since 2023.)

Former members

- Pip Gazard – keyboards (2015–2018)

== Discography ==
=== Studio albums ===
List of studio albums, with selected details and peak chart positions shown
Title	Details	Peak chart positions
Title	Details	AUS
I Love You	Released: 6 October 2023; Label: Domestic La La; Formats: CD, LP, digital download, streaming	6
Glory	Released: 7 November 2025; Label: Community Music / Mom + Pop; Formats: CD, LP, digital download, streaming	9

=== Extended plays ===
List of EPs, with release date and details shown
Title	Details
Creepshow (Note: While technically their debut EP, the band has stated Creepshow has been "scrubbed out of existence" and has been removed from streaming services. They prefer Pretty Good for a Girl Band to be labeled as their debut.)	Released: 28 August 2017; Label: Teen Jesus and the Jean Teasers (independent); Format: Digital download
Pretty Good for a Girl Band	Released: 13 May 2022; Label: Domestic La La; Formats: Digital download, streaming

=== Singles ===
List of singles, with year released and album name shown
Title	Year	Album
"We're All Henry" (Note: "We're All Henry" was originally a part of the Creepshow EP, and is the only song not removed from streaming services.)	2017	Non-album singles
"I Like That You Like That"	2019	Non-album singles
"See You in a Bit (I Still Care)"	2019	Non-album singles
"Desk Chair"	2020	Non-album singles
"Ahhhh!"	2021	Pretty Good for a Girl Band
"Miss Your Birthday"	2021	Pretty Good for a Girl Band
"Girl Sports"	2022	Pretty Good for a Girl Band
"Lights Out"	2023	I Love You
"Never Saw It Coming"	2023	I Love You
"I Used to Be Fun"	2023	I Love You
"Salt"	2023	I Love You
"Dull" (featuring Softcult)	2024	I Love You Too
"Please Me" (featuring The Linda Lindas)	2024	I Love You Too
"Balcony"	2025	Glory
"Unscarred"	2025	Glory
"Mother"	2025	Glory
"Bait"	2025	Glory
"Wonderful"	2025	Glory
"Bath Water"	2026	Glory (Deluxe)
"Go Waste My Time"	2026	Glory (Deluxe)

== Awards and nominations ==
=== AIR Awards ===
The Australian Independent Record Awards (commonly known informally as AIR Awards) is an annual awards night to recognise, promote and celebrate the success of Australia's Independent Music sector.

Year	Nominee / work	Award	Result	Ref.
2023	Teen Jesus and the Jean Teasers	Breakthrough Artist of the Year	Nominated	
2023	Pretty Good for a Girl Band	Best Independent Punk Album or EP	Won	
2023	Domestic La La: Teen Jesus and the Jean Teasers – Pretty Good for a Girl Band	Independent Marketing Team of the Year	Nominated	
2023	Genna Alexopoulos: Teen Jesus and the Jean Teasers – Pretty Good for a Girl Band	Independent Publicity Team of the Year	Won	
2024	"I Used to Be Fun"	Independent Song of the Year	Nominated	
2024	I Love You	Best Independent Rock Album or EP	Won	
2024	Domestic La La: Teen Jesus and the Jean Teasers – I Love You	Independent Marketing Team of the Year	Nominated	
2024	Oscar Dawson: Teen Jesus And The Jean Teasers – I Love You	Independent Producer of the Year	Nominated	
2026	Glory	Best Independent Rock Album or EP	Nominated	

=== APRA Awards ===
The APRA Awards are held in Australia and New Zealand by the Australasian Performing Right Association to recognise songwriting skills, sales and airplay performance by its members annually.

Year	Nominee / work	Award	Result	Ref.
2024	"I Used to Be Fun"	Song of the Year	Shortlisted	
2024	Scarlett McKahey, Anna Ryan, Jaida Stephenson and Neve van Boxsel (Teen Jesus and the Jean Teasers)	Emerging Songwriter of the Year	Nominated	
2025	"Salt"	Most Performed Rock Work	Nominated	
2026	"Balcony"	Song of the Year	Shortlisted	

=== ARIA Music Awards ===
The ARIA Music Awards is an annual award ceremony event celebrating the Australian music industry.

Year	Nominee / work	Award	Result	Ref.
2024	I Love You	Michael Gudinski Breakthrough Artist	Won	
2026	Glory	Best Group	Nominated	
2026	Glory	Best Rock Album	Nominated	

=== J Awards ===
The J Awards are an annual series of Australian music awards that were established by the Australian Broadcasting Corporation's youth-focused radio station Triple J. They commenced in 2005.

Year	Nominee / work	Award	Result	Ref.
2023	I Love You	Australian Album of the Year	Nominated	

=== Rolling Stone Australia Awards ===
The Rolling Stone Australia Awards are awarded annually by the Australian edition of Rolling Stone magazine for outstanding contributions to popular culture in the previous year.

Year	Nominee / work	Award	Result	Ref.
2023	Teen Jesus and the Jean Teasers	Best New Artist	Nominated	
2024	"I Used to Be Fun"	Best Single	Nominated	
2024	Teen Jesus and the Jean Teasers	Best New Artist	Nominated	
2025	Teen Jesus and the Jean Teasers	Best Live Act	Shortlisted	
