= The Grogans =

Australian garage rock band

- Origin: Melbourne, Victoria, Australia
- Genres: Garage rock; surf rock
- Years active: 2016–present
- Labels: Cousin Will
- Members: Quin Grunden; Angus Vasic; Jordan Lewis

The Grogans are an Australian garage rock band from Melbourne. The trio consists of lead vocalist and guitarist Quin Grunden, guitarist Angus Vasic, and drummer Jordan Lewis. Since forming in 2016, they have released three extended plays and four studio albums, most recently, Stagger in 2025. Their sound is inspired by surf rock from the 1960s.

== History ==
Melbourne students Quin Grunden and Angus Vasic had been friends for years in high school. In 2016, Grunden met Jordan Lewis, who had recently moved to the area. The trio began jamming together and formed the Grogans. They independently released their debut extended play (EP), Catceyed, in December 2016, and its follow-up, Twangs N' Cans, in June 2017. The band's third EP, Grogan Grove, was issued in June 2018. It contains "Lemon to My Lime", their first single to receive airplay on national youth radio station Triple J.

The Grogans' debut studio album, Just What You Want, was written and recorded within one week in Torquay, Victoria, and released in October 2019. It was the first album to be issued under their manager Will Stoeckel's independent record label, Cousin Will. The album was supported by an Australian tour from November. It was followed-up with Day / To / Day, released in November 2020, which was preceded by the single "Got A Girl". Writing for Tone Deaf, Alexander Pan called the track a "step forward for the trio" which pays homage to a more "60s surf sound". "Money Will Chase You" from that album was certified Gold by the Australian Recording Industry Association (ARIA) in 2025.

In October 2022, the Grogans released their third studio album, Which Way Is Out. Described by Bryget Chrisfield of Beat as "psychedelic, seductive and dripping with soul", the record features a more present psych-rock influence. It was supported by a 26-date Australia and New Zealand tour from February 2023. The band made their first appearance on the live music programme, Like a Version, in September 2023 where they performed a cover of the Kinks' 1964 single "You Really Got Me". The trio's fourth album, Find Me A Cloud, was released in October 2023 amidst performing several shows across Europe and the United Kingdom. It was named the weekly feature album by Triple J who described it as a "surf-rock, sun-drenched album full of energetic guitars and heartfelt songwriting". The Find Me a Cloud Tour continued in Australia in March 2024.

In November 2023, the Grogans were nominated for Unearthed Artist of the Year at the 2023 J Awards.

In April 2025, the group released "Roundabout", the third single from their fifth studio album Stagger.

== Artistry ==
The Grogans cite surf rock from the 1960s as a major influence for their sound, as well as contemporary acts like Hockey Dad and Tame Impala. With the release of their third album, Augustus Welby of Rolling Stone said their expanding palette spanning blues rock and vintage psychedelic pop took notes from the Beatles and the Kinks.

== Discography ==
=== Albums ===
List of albums, with selected chart positions
Title	Album details	Peak chart positions
Title	Album details	AUS Artist
Just What You Want	Released: 7 October 2019; Label: Cousin Will Records (CWR-001); Format: CD, LP, digital	—
Day / To / Day	Released: 13 November 2020; Label: Cousin Will Records (CWR-003); Format: CD, LP, digital	—
Which Way Is Out	Released: 13 November 2020; Label: Cousin Will Records (CWR-010); Format: LP, digital	17
Find Me a Cloud	Released: 20 October 2023; Label: Cousin Will Records (CWR-015); Format: LP, digital	15
Stagger	Released: 23 May 2025; Label: Community Music (CM-032); Format: CD, LP, digital	9

=== Extended plays ===
List of EPs, with selected details
Title	Details
Cacteyed	Released: December 2016; Label: Self-released
Twangs N' Cans	Released: June 2017; Label: Self-released
Grogan Grove	Released: June 2018; Label: Cousin Will Records

=== Certified songs ===
Title	Year	Certifications	Album
"Money Will Chase You"	2019	ARIA: Gold	Just Want You Want
