= Elsy Wameyo =

- Born: Elsy Wameyo; Nairobi, Kenya
- Occupations: Singer; songwriter; rapper; producer
- Years active: 2018–present
- Musical career
- Genres: Hip hop; Soul
- Instrument: Vocals
- Labels: Playback 808; Music in Exile

Elsy Wameyo, also known as ELSY, is a Kenyan Australian singer-songwriter and rapper, whose style ranges from hip hop to the fusion of traditional African music with contemporary rap and R&B. Based in Adelaide, South Australia, Wameyo was awarded Young Kenyan of the Year in 2018, and won People's Choice Best Hip Hop Award at the annual South Australian Music Awards in 2019. Her first studio album, Saints Sinner, was released in July 2024.

== Early life ==
Wameyo was born in Nairobi, Kenya, and migrated to Australia with her family in 2006, when she was seven years old.

== Music career ==
Wameyo has performed at Laneway and Groovin' the Moo festivals, and was a featured artist with triple j Unearthed. As of 2019 she was signed with the independent record label created by her mentor, Gabriel Akon, aka DyspOra, Playback 808, but her November 2021 single, "Nilotic", was released on the Music in Exile label.

Lady Leshurr and Masego have shown interest in her music, and she has also played alongside Adrian Eagle, Printz Board, Aminé, Sampa the Great, Hilltop Hoods, and Duckwrth. In October 2018, she appeared as ELSY, as one of two support acts for DOBBY (along with DyspOra) at Nexus Arts in Adelaide, as part of the OzAsia Festival.

Her work is informed by her strong belief in God, and she sees her talent as a gift from God. In 2019 she did not feel her African roots to be a huge influence on her music, but the response to her music in Kenya was enthusiastic when Akon took samples there. Her music is influenced by the gospel tradition as well as contemporary R&B, and in 2022 she cited Kendrick Lamar, Little Simz and Ludwig Göransson (who composed the music for the film Black Panther (film) as her biggest musical influences. She produces her own music, and directed her music video for her 2022 single "River Nile".

Her first single, "Intuition" was released in early 2018. This was followed by "Outcast" in November 2019 and "Pastor" in February 2020. "Outcast" tells a personal story, largely based on the experience of growing up as an African in Australia, and the effect that racism has had on her and her peers. Both singles received positive reviews. It also explores the concept of "home" for African Australians.

She was studying full-time at university as of 2019, and also singing in her church. She spent some time travelling over the northern winter in 2019–2020, in Europe, the US and Kenya, during which she had a break from songwriting. Her 2020 single, "Pastor" uses an upbeat rhythm to explore feelings of anger, as she explores identity and belonging from the point of view of her parents, migrating to Australia.

She performed at WOMADelaide in March 2022.

Her first EP, Nilotic was released on 1 April 2022, featuring the singles "River Nile" and "Nilotic", and four other tracks. Its name is a nod to her Nilotic roots, and the title track (released November 2021 on the label Music in Exile) is more overtly political, addressing issues of culture, race and police brutality. She mentioned Ota Benga, Trayvon Martin and George Floyd as part of her inspiration for the track.

Her single "River Nile" is featured in the mobile football video game EFootball 24 as one of the in-game soundtracks.

In May 2024, Wameyo announced her debut studio album Saint Sinner would be released on 26 July 2024. The album, which was co-produced with Wuod Omollo and Polycarp Otieno, includes collaborations with musicians in the rural Naivasha region of Kenya as well as Nairobi singer Okello Max. The styles range from Afrobeat to the fusion of traditional African musical styles with contemporary rap and R&B.

== Discography ==
=== Albums ===
List of albums, with selected details
Title	Details
Saint Sinner	Released: 26 July 2024; Label: Self-released

=== Extended plays ===
List of EPs, with selected details
Title	Details
Nilotic	Released: 1 April 2022; Label: Music in Exile
Wameyo	Released: 28 November 2025; Label: Elsy Wameyo

=== As lead artist ===
Title	Year	EP
"Intuition"	2018	TBA
"Daily"	2018	TBA
"Outcast"	2019	TBA
"Pastor"	2020	TBA
"Never There"	2020	TBA
"Time Flies"	2021	TBA
"Nilotic"	2021	Nilotic (EP)
"River Nile"	2022	Nilotic (EP)
"Make Way" (with Motez)	2023	Non-album single
"Sinner"	2024	Saint Sinner
"Piny Lara"	2024	Saint Sinner
"Umva"	2024	Saint Sinner
"Coquer" (with Ywaya Tajiri)	2024	Saint Sinner
"Size Four"	2025	
"Wameyo"	2025	Wameyo
"Crash Out"	2025	Wameyo

=== As featured artist ===
Year	Title	Album
2018	"Seven" (Holas May feat. Elsy Wameyo)	
2018	"Open Wide" (DyspOra feat. Elsy Wameyo)	AustrAlien
2020	"Long Road" (Stefan Rossi feat. Elsy Wameyo)	

== Awards and nominations ==
- 2018: Winner, Young Kenyan of the Year at the Kenyan Association of South Australia (KASA)
- 2021: Winner, Carclew Creative Achievement Award at the 7NEWS Young Achiever Awards - SA

=== AIR Awards ===
The Australian Independent Record Awards (commonly known informally as AIR Awards) is an annual awards night to recognise, promote and celebrate the success of Australia's Independent Music sector.

Year	Nominee / work	Award	Result	Ref.
2026	Wameyo	Best Independent Hip Hop Album or EP	Nominated	

=== J Awards ===
The J Awards are an annual series of Australian music awards that were established by the Australian Broadcasting Corporation's youth-focused radio station Triple J. They commenced in 2005.

Year	Nominee / work	Award	Result	Ref.
2022	Elsy Wameyo	Unearthed Artist of the Year	Won	

=== South Australian Music Awards ===
The South Australian Music Awards, also known as SA Music Awards, commonly SAM Awards, formerly Fowler's Live Music Awards (FLMA), are annual awards that exist to recognise, promote and celebrate excellence in the South Australian contemporary music industry.

Year	Nominee / work	Award	Result	Ref.
2018	Elsy Wameyo	Best New Artist	Nominated	
2018	Elsy Wameyo	Best World Music	Nominated	
2019	Elsy Wameyo	People's Choice Hip Hop Award	Won	
2026	Elsy Wameyo	Best Solo Artist	Won	
2026	Elsy Wameyo	Best Music Video	Won	
2026	Elsy Wameyo	Best Hip Hop	Won	
