= South Australian Music Awards =

Annual music awards in South Australia

- Location: Adelaide, South Australia
- Country: Australia
- Presented by: Music SA
- First award: 2012; 14 years ago (as Fowler's Live Music Awards)
- Final award: Current
- Website: southaustralianmusicawards.com.au

The South Australian Music Awards, also known as SA Music Awards, commonly SAM Awards, formerly Fowler's Live Music Awards (FLMA), are annual awards that exist to recognise, promote and celebrate excellence in the South Australian contemporary music industry. They take place in Adelaide, South Australia every November. The venue has varied over the years.

== Background and history ==
The South Australian Music Industry Awards (SAMIAs) concluded in 2005.

The inaugural South Australian Music Awards took place in November 2015, after having been known as the Fowler's Live Music Awards (FLMA) from 2012 to 2014, when custodianship was handed to Music SA. Fowler's Live (since 2018 and as of 2021 Lion Arts Factory) was a popular Adelaide live music venue. Major partners are as of 2019 the South Australian Government's Music Development Office (in the Department of Innovation & Skills), The Music, Moshtix & Australian Hotels Association.

== Eligibility and awards ==
=== Eligibility ===
All applicants must have commercially released the entered work between the eligible period of 1 August to 31 July (of the award year). All applicants must have at least 50% of their band members residing in South Australia or they must identify and promote themselves as being South Australian. All applicants should be registered with APRA AMCOS. All entered works must be original compositions.

=== Award winners ===
People's choice awards are 100% voted for by the public via themusic.com.au. For the Industry and Major awards, a judging panel consisting of ten local and five national industry peers is selected each year. The panel includes a diverse range of gender, age and culture.

== 2012–2014: Fowler's Live Music Awards ==
=== 2012 ===
The 2012 Fowler's Live Music Awards took place at Fowlers on 1 November 2012 to "recognise success and achievement over the past 12 months [and] celebrate the great diversity of original live music" in South Australia. 20 industry and five public voted awards were handed out. The winners are listed below.

Genre awards

- Best Acoustic Artist – The Audreys
- Best Country Artist – Tracey Pans & Claypan
- Best Electronica Artist – The Killgirls
- Best Folk Artist – Heather Frahn
- Best Hip Hop Artist – Hilltop Hoods
- Best Indie Artist – Fire! Santa Rosa, Fire!
- Best Jazz Artist – Bottleneck
- Best Metal Artist – Truth Corroded
- Best New World Artist – Shaolin Afronauts
- Best Pop Artist – Leader Cheetah
- Best Punk Artist – Coerce
- Best Rock Artist – Lady Strangelove
- Best Emerging Blues Artist – Carla Lippis & The Martial Hearts
- Best Emerging Contemporary Music Artist – Johnny McIntyre
- Best Music Initiative – Moving Music
- Best Music Manager – Daisy Brown
- Best Music Organisation or Individual – Alice Fraser
- Best Music Video – "You Should Consider Having Sex with a Bearded Man" by The Beards
- Achievement Awards – Sacha Sewell, El Dorado

People's Choice Awards

- Most Popular SA Release – Tales of Love & Loss by The Borderers
- Most Popular SA Band / Artist – The Borderers
- Most Popular Live Music Venue – The Governor Hindmarsh Hotel ("The Gov")
- Most Popular SA Live Music Event – WOMADelaide
- Most Popular Regional Band / Artist – Eviscerate

=== 2013 ===
The 2013 Fowler's Live Music Awards took place in November 2013. The winners are listed below.

Genre awards

- Best Acoustic Artist – Kaurna Cronin
- Best Blues Artist – Don Morrison
- Best Country Artist – Amber Joy Poulton
- Best Electronica Artist – isima
- Best Folk Artist – Heather Frahn
- Best Hip Hop Artist – Jimblah
- Best Indie Artist – Bad//Dreems
- Best Jazz Artist – The Airbenders
- Best Metal Artist – Truth Corroded
- Best Pop Artist – The Beards
- Best Punk Artist – The Mark of Cain
- Best Rock Artist – Tracer
- Best Roots Artist – The Bearded Gypsy Band
- Best Music Initiative – A Band On Boat
- Best Music Manager – Ricky Kradolfer (City Riots)
- Best Music Organisation or Individual – Pilot Records
- Best Music Video – "Desert" by Messrs
- Achievement Awards – Tam & Anne Boakes

People's Choice Awards

- Favourite SA produced and Recorded Artist Release of the Year – One More Tear by Echo & The Empress
- Favourite SA band / Artist – Ice on Mercury
- Favourite SA Live Music Venue – Governor Hindmarsh Hotel ("The Gov")
- Favourite SA Live Music Event – WOMADelaide
- Favourite SA Music Media Source – Rip It Up magazine

=== 2014 ===
The 2014 Fowler's Live Music Awards took place on 13 November 2014. Organiser Peter Darwin said "It is humbling to see the level of support both within the industry and from the music loving public for the FLMA's. The event has become a great celebration, and well-deserved recognition for our quality artists!" The winners are listed below.

Genre awards

- Best Acoustic Artist – Timberwolf
- Best Blues Artist – Lazy Eye
- Best Country Artist – Sandra Humphries
- Best Electronica Artist – Tkay Maidza
- Best Hip Hop Artist – Allday
- Best Indie Artist – Sparkspitter
- Best Jazz Artist – Ross McHenry
- Best Metal Artist – Truth Corroded
- Best Pop Artist – The Beards
- Best Punk Artist – Paper Arms
- Best Rock Artist – Bad//Dreems
- Best Roots Artist – Shaolin Afronauts
- SA Songwriters(s) of the Year – Bad//Dreems
- Best Music Initiative – The Porch Sessions
- Best Music Manager – Jason North & Greg Shaw
- Best Music Organisation or Individual – The Jam Room
- Best Music Video – "Grace" by Timberwolf
- Achievement Awards – Ross McHenry and Gordon Andersen

People's Choice Awards

- Favourite SA Song of the year – "Tempest" by Julia Henning
- Favourite SA band / artist – Julia Henning
- Favourite SA live music venue – Governor Hindmarsh Hotel ("The Gov")
- Favourite SA live music event – WOMADelaide
- Favourite SA music media source – Rip It Up magazine

== 2015–present: SAM Awards ==
=== 2015 ===
The 2015 South Australian Music Awards took place on 10 November 2015. The Ryan Freeman Live Music Award, created in honour of Ryan Freeman, a live music fan who died in 2009, was awarded to Kelly Menhennett who also received $4000 to assist her career. 2015 marks Music SA's inaugural custodianship of the rebranded awards. The winners are listed below.

Genre awards

- Best Release – Tkay Maidza
- Best Female – Tkay Maidza
- Best Male – Timberwolf
- Best Group – Grenadiers
- Best New Artist – Skies
- Best Song – Tkay Maidza
- Best Songwriter – Chris Panousakis (Timberwolf)
- Best Live Act – Bad//Dreems
- Best Music Video – "Switch Lanes"[ Tkay Maidza (directed by Sachio Cook)
- Best Cover Art – Skies (Cover art by Jack Vanzet)
- Best Producer – Motez
- Best Manager – 5/4 Entertainment
- Best Music Venue – The Governor Hindmarsh Hotel
- Best Festival / Music Event – WOMADelaide
- Most Popular Artist – Truth Corroded
- Ryan Freeman Live Music Award – Kelly Menhennett
- Fowler's Live Achievement Award – Robert Dunstan, BSide Magazine (for sustained contribution to the local music industry)

=== 2016 ===
The 2016 South Australian Music Awards took place on 10 November 2016. The winners are listed below.

Genre awards

- Best Release – Bad//Dreems
- Best Female – MANE
- Best Male – Jesse Davidson
- Best Group – Bad//Dreems
- Best Aboriginal or Torres Strait Island Artist – A.B. Original
- Best New Artist – A.B Original
- Best Song – Tkay Maidza
- Best Music Video – "Kazoo" by God God Dammit Dammit (directed by Aaron Schuppan)
- Best Cover Art – Brokers (Cover art by James Packer)
- Best Manager – Craig Lock
- Best Music Venue – Grace Emily Hotel
- Best Festival / Music Event – WOMADelaide
- Best Engineer – Tom Barnes
- Best Studio – Mixmasters Studios
- Ryan Freeman Live Music Award – Kaurna Cronin
- Lifetime Achievement Award – Gary Burrows
- Best International Collaboration – "Do It Right" by Tkay Maidza (with Martin Solveig)

Public Voted Categories

- Most Popular Blues/Roots Artist – Ben Ford-Davies
- Most Popular Country Artist – Max Savage
- Most Popular Electronic Artist – Motez
- Most Popular Experimental / Avant-garde Artist – Sparkspitter
- Most Popular Folk / Acoustic Artist – Ben Ford-Davies
- Most Popular Heavy Artist – Stabbitha & The Knifey Wifeys
- Most Popular Hip Hop Artist – Koolta
- Most Popular Jazz Artist – Adam Page & Ben Todd

=== 2017 ===
The 2017 South Australian Music Awards took place on 9 November 2017 at the Thebarton Theatre. The winners are listed below.

Genre awards

- Best Group – A.B. Original
- Best Male Artist – DyspOra
- Best Female Artist – Tkay Maidza
- Best Aboriginal or Torres Strait Islander Artist – A.B. Original
- Best New Artist – Heaps Good Friends
- Best Release – Reclaim Australia by A.B. Original
- Best Song – "January 26" by A.B. Original featuring Dan Sultan
- Best Music Video – "January 26" by A.B. Original featuring Dan Sultan (Directed by Richard Coburn)
- Best Cover Art – Stuart Highway by The Bitter Darlings (cover art by Henry Stentiford)
- Best Manager – Craig Lock
- Best Music Venue – Grace Emily Hotel
- Best Festival / Music Event – Porch Sessions
- Best Engineer – Tom Barnes
- Best Studio – Chapel Lane Studios
- Ryan Freeman Live Music Award – Robert Dunstan
- Best International Collaboration – House of Songs Project
- Lifetime Achievement Award – The Governor Hindmarsh Hotel

Public Voted Categories

- Most Popular Blues/Roots Artist – Wanderers
- Most Popular Country Artist – The Bitter Darlings
- Most Popular Electronic Artist – Abbey Howlett
- Most Popular Experimental / Avant-garde Artist – Timberwolf
- Most Popular Folk Artist – The Winter Gyspy
- Most Popular Heavy Artist – Ice On Mercury
- Most Popular Hip Hop Artist – A.B. Original
- Most Popular Jazz Artist – Ross McHenry
- Most Popular Pop Artist – Rachael Leahcar
- Most Popular Punk Artist – Young Offenders
- Most Popular Rock Artist – Bad//Dreems
- Most Popular World Music Artist – Adam Page

=== 2018 ===
The 2018 South Australian Music Awards was hosted by Zan Rowe and took place at Thebarton Theatre on 8 November 2018. The winners are listed below.

Genre awards

- Best Group – West Thebarton
- Best Solo Artist – MANE
- Best New Artist – Adrian Eagle
- Best Aboriginal or Torres Strait Island Artist – A.B. Original
- Best Release – Different Beings Being Different by West Thebarton
- Best Song –"Bible Camp" by West Thebarton
- Best Music Video – "Better" by Mallrat (Directed by Rory Pippan – Young Black Youth)
- Best Cover Art – Neon Tetra (Cover art by Jack Fenby)
- Best Manager – Craig Lock
- Best Music Venue – Crown and Anchor Hotel
- Best Studio – Ghostnote Recording Studio
- Best Engineer – Mario Spate
- Best Music Festival / Event – A Day of Clarity
- Best International Collaboration – Zephyr Quartet
- Ryan Freeman Live Music Award – Max Savage
- Lifetime Achievement Award – Tam Boakes

Public Voted Categories

- Most Popular Blues/Roots Award – Ollie English
- Most Popular Country Award – The Heggarties
- Most Popular Electronic Award – Motez
- Most Popular Experimental Award – Abbey Howlett
- Most Popular Folk Award – Laura Hill
- Most Popular Heavy Award – Dirty Pagans and Hidden Intent
- Most Popular Hip Hop Award – Tkay Maidza
- Most Popular Jazz/Art Music Award – Adam Page
- Most Popular Pop Award – Heaps Good Friends
- Most Popular Punk Award – Young Offenders
- Most Popular Rock Award – West Thebarton
- Most Popular World Music Award – The Coconut Kids

=== 2019 ===
The 2019 South Australian Music Awards took place in Bonython Hall at the University of Adelaide on 22 November 2019. Kelly Menhennett, Jimblah, Stellie, Jess Day, Horror My Friend and Electric Fields gave live performances.

There were a few changes in 2019. The APRA/AMCOS Emily Burrows Award, instituted in 2001 in memory of Emily Burrows, a former APRA AMCOS membership representative and compliance officer and awarded to a South Australian artist or band, was included in the ceremony. The "World Music" category was replaced with "Soul/Funk/RnB", and the "Best Engineer" category was split into "Best Live Engineer" and "Best Studio Engineer". The winners are listed below.

General Awards

- Best Group - Horror My Friend
- Best Solo Artist - Adrian Eagle
- Best Aboriginal or Torres Strait Island Artist – Electric Fields
- Best New Artist - Jess Day
- Best Release - "A-OK" by Adrian Eagle
- Best Song – "Turned Loose" by Horror My Friend
- Best Music Video - "Wedding" by Horror My Friend (Directed by Ryan Sahb)
- Best Cover Art - "Caffeine" by Dress Code (Cover art by Jack Fenby)
- Best Manager - Alex Karatassa
- Best Music Festival / Event - Stonecutters / Porchland
- Best Music Venue – Lion Arts Factory
- Best Studio - Wundenberg's Recording and Rehearsal Studios
- Best Engineer - Mario Spate
- Best International Collaboration – Slava and Lenny Grigoryan with Beijing Duo as part of the Adelaide Guitar Festival
- Lifetime Achievement Award – Neville Clark

People's Choice Awards

- Blues/Roots Award - Ollie English
- Country Award - The Cut Snakes
- Electronic Award - Electric Fields
- Experimental Award - Sons of Zöku
- Folk Award - Ukulele Death Squad
- Heavy Award - Hidden Intent
- Hip Hop Award – Elsy Wameyo
- Jazz Music Award - Adam Page
- Pop Award – Germein
- Punk Award - Wing Defence
- Rock Award - TOWNS
- Soul/Funk/RnB Award - Wanderers

=== 2020 ===
The 2020 South Australian Music Awards took place on 3 November 2020 at UniBar Adelaide. The inaugural presentation of a new award, the Innovation Award, was presented by CityMag magazine. The winners are listed below.

General Awards

- Best Group - Wing Defence
- Best Solo - Jess Day
- Best Aboriginal or Torres Strait Islander - Jessica Wishart
- Best New Artist - Siberian Tiger & Slowmango
- Best Release - "Soulitude" by Motez & Friends by Wing Defence
- Best Song - "Affection" by Jess Day
- Best Music Video - "Soulitude" by Motez (Motez, Pilot Studio, Mapped Design, Daggers Production, Kelsey Pedler)
- Best Cover Art - "Shaping Distant Memories" by Lost Woods (cover art by Todd Fischer)
- Best Manager - Matthew Khabbaz
- Best Innovation - play / pause / play
- Best Music Educator - Nick O'Connor (Northern Sound System)
- Best Studio - Ghostnote
- Best Studio Engineer / Producer - Mario Spate
- Best Live Technician - Luke Hancock
- Best Small Festival/Event - The Porch Sessions
- Best Major Festival/Event – St Jerome's Laneway Festival Adelaide
- Best Venue - Lion Arts Factory
- Best International Collaboration Award - "Maula Ya Ali" by Farhan Shah and Udan Khatola with Ustad Islamuddin Meer sahib.
- Community Achievement Award - Craig Armstrong
- Emily Burrows Award - Seabass

People's Choice Awards

- Blues & Roots - Ollie English
- Country - Jessica Wishart
- Electronic - Motez
- Experimental - Sons of Zöku
- Folk- Naomi Keyte
- Heavy - NO NO NO NO NO
- Hip Hop - We Move Like Giants
- Jazz - Django Rowe
- Pop - Germein
- Punk - Wing Defence
- Rock - TOWNS
- Soul/Funk/RnB - Wanderers

=== 2021 ===
The 2021 South Australian Music Awards took place on 18 November 2021 at the Old Adelaide Gaol.

General Awards

- Best Group - Teenage Joans
- Best Solo - Motez
- Best Aboriginal or Torres Strait Islander - Tilly Tjala Thomas
- Best New Artist - Teenage Joans
- Best Release - Taste of Me by Teenage Joans
- Best Song - "Something About Being Sixteen" by Teenage Joans
- Best Music Video - "Poppy" by Glowing (Harry Nathan)
- Best Cover Art - "Taste of Me" by Teenage Joans (cover art by Samuel Graves & Eve Burner)
- Best Manager - Rachel Whitford
- Best Innovation - WOMADelaide x NSS Academy
- Best Music Educator - Alison Hams
- Best Studio - Chapel Lane Studios & Wundenberg's Recording Studio (tie)
- Best Studio Engineer / Producer - Kiah Gossner
- Best Live Technician - Lisa Lane Collins
- Best Small Festival/Event - Space Jams South Coast Tour
- Best Major Festival/Event – WOMADelaide
- Best Venue - Jive

Special Awards

- City of Adelaide Exceptional Live Performance Award - Teenage Joans
- Adelaide Unesco City of Music Best International Collaboration - Lazaro Numa
- Emily Burrows Award - Tilly Tjala Thomas
- Rosanna and Neville Clark Award - Ryan Martin John And Aidan Cibich
- Music SA Community Achievement Award - Mick Wordley

People's Choice Awards

- Blues & Roots - Cal Williams Jr
- Country - Ricky Albeck & The Belair Line Band
- Electronic - Motez
- Experimental - Sons of Zöku
- Folk - Siberian Tiger
- Heavy - Kitchen Witch
- Hip Hop - Boffa
- Jazz - Chelsea Lee
- Pop - G-Nat!on
- Punk - Teenage Joans
- Rock - TOWNS
- Soul/Funk/RnB - Mum Thinks Blue

=== 2022 ===
The 2022 award-winners were:

- Best Song – "River Nile" by Elsy Wameyo
- Best Group – Electric Fields

=== 2023 ===
The 2023 South Australian Music Awards took place on 8 November 2023.

- Hall of Fame - Paul Kelly
- Best New Artist - The Empty Threats
- Best Regional Artist - DEM MOB
- Best Aboriginal Or Torres Strait Islander Artist - DEM MOB
- Best Solo Artist - Alana Jagt
- Best Song -The Empty Threats "Evil Eye"
- Best Release - Slowmango Hypercolour Miscellaneous
- Best Group - Bad//Dreems
- Best Manager - Rachel Whitford
- Best Regional Live Music Venue or Live Music Activation - Adelaide Guitar Festival - On The Road 2023
- Best Live Music Venue - Crown & Anchor
- Best Studio - Wundenbergs
- Best Cover Art - Kaspar Schmidt Mumm & The Bait Fridge - 'Hypercolour Miscellaneous' By Slowmango
- Best Music Video - Conor Mercury Movies for "Bills" By Carla Geneve
- Best Music Educator - Kurunpa Kunpuntjaku (DEM MOB)
- Best Studio Engineer/Producer - Lewis Wundenberg
- Best Live Technician - Nathan D'agostino
- Best Small Music Festival or Event - Some Shine Festival
- Best Major Music Festival or Event - Vintage Vibes Festival
- Most Popular Blues & Roots - Dojo Rise
- Most Popular Country - Mark Curtis And The Flannelettes
- Most Popular Electronic - Electric Fields
- Most Popular Experimental or Art Music - SONS OF ZOKU
- Most Popular Folk- Ukulele Death Squad
- Most Popular Heavy - Stabbitha and the Knifey Wifeys
- Most Popular Hip Hop - DEM MOB
- Most Popular Jazz - 5 Sided Cube
- Most Popular Pop - The Tullamarines
- Most Popular Punk - Teenage Joans
- Most Popular Rock - Mums Favourite
- Most Popular Soul, Funk or RnB - Mum Thinks Blue
- Neville Clark Award - Todd Pergallini & Jase Ess
- Emily Burrows Award - DEM MOB
- Best International Collaboration - Adam Page
- Community Achievement Award - Girls Rock! Adelaide

=== 2024 ===
2024 awardees included:

- Hall of Fame – Guy Sebastian
- Best New Artist – Aleksiah (Alexia Damokas)
- Best Solo Artist – Aleksiah
- Most Popular Pop Artist – Aleksiah
- Emily Burrows Award – Aleksiah
- Best Song – "Ceiling Fan" by Swapmeet
- Best Release – Oxalis, by Swapmeet
- Best Group – Teenage Joans
- Best Aboriginal or Torres Strait Islander Artist – Electric Fields
- Best Regional Artist – DEM MOB
- best live music venue – Crown & Anchor
- Best Large Music Festival – Adelaide Beer & BBQ Festival
- Best Small Music Festival – Space Jams
- Best Studio Engineer or Producer – Lucinda Machin
- Artists' Manager Award – Rachel Whitford
- Neville Clark Award, for song production graduates – Matt Stasinowsky and Joshua Rocca
- Community Achievement Award – The Sisters of Invention

=== 2025 ===
The 2025 awards took place on 28 October 2025 and hosted by Sosefina Fuamoli and Troy Sincock. awardees included:

==== Major Awards ====
- Best Song – "Clothes Off" by Aleksiah
- Best New Artist – Ella Ion
- Best Regional Artist – DEM MOB
- Best Solo Artist – Aleksiah
- Best Group – Oscar the Wild
- Best Aboriginal or Torres Strait Islander Artist – DEM MOB
- Best Release – Cry About It by Aleksiah

==== Industry Awards ====
- Best Cover Art – Towns (Dan Steinert)
- Best Large Music Festival – Adelaide Beer & BBQ Festival
- Best Live Music Photograph – Elise De Simoni (Amyl and the Sniffers)
- Best Live Music Venue – Lion Arts Factory
- Best Live Technician – Luke Hancock
- Best Manager – Hannah Louise
- Best Music Educator – DEM MOB
- Best Music Video – Grace Stewart (Moon Made – Effie Isobel)
- Best Music Venue/ Festival/Event –Limestone Coast Beer & BBQ Festival
- Best Small Festival – Porch and Recreation
- Best Studio – Wizard Tone Studios
- Best Studio Engineer / Prodocuer – Mario Späte & Lucinda Machin
- Collaboration Award – Mark Ferguson
- Community Achievement Award – Nat Edwards
- Neville Clark Award – Michael Esterhuizen and Lisa Burns
- Year 10 Award – Rob Edwards

==== People's Choice Awards ====
- Blues & Roots – Laura Hill
- Country – River Rose
- Electronic – Tonix
- Experimental and Art – Violet Harlot
- Folk – Ella Ion
- Heavy – Raccoon City
- Hip Hop – DEM MOB
- Jazz – Live Slug Reaction
- Pop – aleksiah
- Punk – Lola
- Rock – Oscar the Wild
- Soul/ Funk/ r&b – Wanderers
