= Domestic La La =

Australian record label

- Parent company: Unified Music Group
- Founded: 2017; 9 years ago
- Founder: James Tidswell
- Country of origin: Australia
- Official website: domesticlala.com

Domestic La La is an Australian record label founded in 2017 by Violent Soho guitarist James Tidswell. It is a subsidiary of Unified Music Group. Prominent signings include Dear Seattle, Teen Jesus and the Jean Teasers, Teenage Joans and West Thebarton.

== History ==
Domestic La La, named after a Violent Soho song, was founded in 2017 by the band's guitarist James Tidswell. The label is managed under Unified Music Group. Its first two signings were Adelaide rock band West Thebarton and Sydney grunge group Dear Seattle.

== Record club ==
The label has released ten seven-inch singles through their own subscription service, Domestic La La Record Club. Each issue features two tracks from different groups, with the first featuring "Ivan" by West Thebarton's backed with "Dark Shadows" by Stork.

== Artists ==
- Dear Seattle
- Divers
- Loser
- Teen Jesus and the Jean Teasers
- Teenage Joans
- The Terrys
- West Thebarton
