= Sweet as Sin (disambiguation) =

Sweet as Sin is a 2012 book about candy.

Sweet as Sin may also refer to:

- "Sweet as Sin", a song from the English version of the Fey album Dulce Tentación
- "Sweet as Sin", a song by INXS released with the singles "This Time" and "What You Need"
- "Sweet as Sin", a song by The Lust-O-Rama

== See also ==
- As Sweet as Sin, 2006 album by the Bleeders
- The Sweets of Sin, Australian pop band
