= Hired Gun (disambiguation) =

Hired gun refers to a mercenary soldier, hired professional killer or "torpedo", or someone who conducts themselves like a mercenary in non-military affairs.

Hired Gun may also refer to:

== Role ==
- Session musician or "hired gun", a musician who's been hired by a studio or band to play his part on the album or record
- Hired gun, an informal name for an expert witness hired by a prosecutor/litigant or defendant in a court case to testify on their behalf for whom the Daubert standard rule of evidence applies

== Arts, entertainment, and media ==
- Hired Gun (Microsoft), a video game development team
- Hired Gun, an Australian country music band, The Hired Guns (1996–2010) started as The Lizard Train
- "Hired Gun", a song from Bad Brains' album I Against I
- "Hired Gun", a song from Chris Rea's album Shamrock Diaries
- The Hired Gun (1957 film), a 1957 Western directed by Ray Nazarro
- Hired Guns, a 1993 video game from Psygnosis

== See also ==
- Go Gorilla Go
- Hired Hand (disambiguation)
