= Exploding White Mice =

Australian punk-pop band

- Origin: Adelaide, South Australia, Australia
- Genre: Punk-pop
- Years active: 1983–1999
- Labels: Greasy Pop, Festival, Bigtime, Normal, Shock, Au Go Go, Bastard
- Past members: Paul Gilchrist; Andy MacQueen (deceased); Gerry Barrett; Craig Rodda; Jeff Stephens; David Bunney; Dave Mason; Jack Jacomos; Andrew Bunney

Exploding White Mice were an Australian punk-pop band from Adelaide which formed in 1983 with Paul Gilchrist on vocals, Andy MacQueen on bass guitar, Gerry Barrett on guitar, Craig Rodda on drums and Giles Barrow on rhythm guitar. In 1984 Barrett was replaced by Jeff Stephens on guitar – later also on lead vocals. In 1985 Rodda was replaced on drums by David Bunney. The group released four studio albums, Brute Force and Ignorance (August 1988), Exploding White Mice (1990), Collateral Damage (1992) and We Walk Alone (1994). The band toured Europe twice before disbanding in April 1999.

== History ==
=== 1983-1999 ===
Exploding White Mice were formed in 1983 in Adelaide when Paul Gilchrist on vocals played a one-off show as a cover band at a party with Andy MacQueen on bass guitar (ex-The Deviants, Crunch Pets), Gerry Barrett on guitar (Del Webb Explosion) and Craig Rodda on drums (Screaming Believers). The band's name was taken from a scene in the 1979 film Rock 'n' Roll High School, where a laboratory mouse spontaneously explodes upon exposure to music by The Ramones. Aside from The Ramones other major influences include Radio Birdman, MC5, The Stooges, Johnny Thunders and American 1960s garage punk. The party gig went so well that the group decided to play regularly. One show was attended by Giles Barrow, who joined on rhythm guitar. In 1984 they started a residency at the Cathedral Hotel. Barrett left near year's end and was replaced on guitar by Jeff Stephens (Firm Grip, Spitfire, Tombstone Shadow).

Initially Exploding White Mice were a covers band, then they began working on original tunes. In 1985 after adding David Bunney on drums (Zippy & the Coneheads), they released a six-track extended play, A Nest of Vipers, on Australia's Greasy Pop Records. It was produced by Kim Horne. Also in 1985 their track, "Down on the Street" appeared on the label's compilation album, An Oasis in a Desert of Noise. In 1986 Sydney rock publication, RAM, named Nest of Vipers as the best Australian record of the year. The record was issued in the US on Bigtime Records, renamed as In the Nest of Vipers, but despite selling several thousand copies, the group received no royalties as Bigtime became insolvent soon after. During 1986 and 1987 the group regularly toured major Australian cities and put out 7" singles. In March 1987 they issued the single, "Blaze of Glory" with a B-side being a cover of John Kongos' hit, "He's Gonna Step On You Again". In August 1988 they issued their debut LP, Brute Force and Ignorance, which had been recorded and engineered by Kim Horne at Soundtrack Studios. Shortly before its release, Barrow left and was replaced by Dave Mason, formerly of Primevils. In 1989 Jack Jacomos replaced Mason in turn.

In 1990 the group toured Europe and released a half-studio, half-live self-titled LP on Normal Records. Shortly after, Gilchrist left and Stephens took over on lead vocals. In early 1991 they began recording a new album, Collateral Damage, again at Soundtrack Studios. However, when the Greasy Pop label went out of business that year, they could not find a local distributor and released it in 1992 on Normal Records in Germany and NKVD Records in the United States. David's brother Andrew Bunney (Zippy and the Coneheads) joined on rhythm guitar. The group's final album was 1994's We Walk Alone, on Au Go Go Records, Lucky Records (US), Subway (Europe) and 12" LP Rock & Roll Inc 008 (Spain). The group had a cameo appearance on John Winter's 1994 film The Roly Poly Man portraying a "punk-rock bar-band from Hell". In 1995 they re-released Nest of Vipers with bonus tracks on Bastard Records. In 1996 they issued the EP Prepare to Die, toured Europe with German band, The Richies. Exploding White Mice disbanded in April 1999.

=== After disbandment and other activities ===
From 1985, Gerry Barrett joined Dust Collection – a psychedelic and garage-punk covers band – which performed a 25th anniversary gig in September 2009.

In 1997, Andrew Bunney co-produced a five-track EP, Loose, for Adelaide-based punk rockers, The Gels, which was issued on Bastard Records. In 2002 Jeff Stephens co-produced two tracks for The Gels' five-track EP, Somebody Someday. In August 2003, Stephens co-produced that group's debut album, Never Mind the Title, Here's The Gels, which was launched in November. The track, "We Don't Get no Radio Play" featured an excerpt from Exploding White Mice's "Enemies".

In 2010, David Bunney joined Black Chrome - a first wave Adelaide punk band formed in the 1970s.

As of March 2012, Jack Jacomos worked as a mental health nurse.

Bassist Andy MacQueen died suddenly on 27 May 2018.

In 2023, Jeff Stephens joined Adelaide hardcore punk band, Where’s The Pope? for their reunion gig.

== Discography ==
=== Studio albums ===
Title	Details	Peak chart positions
Title	Details	AUS
Brute Force and Ignorance	Released: August 1988; Label: The Greasy Record Company, Festival Records (L 38912); Format: LP, CD, MC	60
Exploding White Mice	Released: June 1990; Label: The Greasy Record Company, Festival Records (L 30288); Format: LP, CD, MC	90
Collateral Damage	Released: 1992; Label: Normal Records (NORMAL 144); Format: LP, CD	—
We Walk Alone	Released: 1994; Label: Au Go Go (ANDA 172); Format: CD	—

=== Extended plays ===
Title	Details
A Nest of Vipers	Released: 1985; Label: Greasy Pop Records (GPR 115); Format: LP, CD, Cassette
Prepare to Die	Released: 1997; Label: Subway Records; Format: LP

=== Singles ===
Year	Single	Peak chart positions	Album
Year	Single	AUS	Album
1987	"Blaze of Glory" / "He's Gonna Step on You Again"	—	non album single
1988	"Fear (Late at Night)" / "Without Warning"	—	Brute Force and Ignorance
1989	"Breakdown Number 2" / "Bury Me"	—	Brute Force and Ignorance
1989	"Make It" / "Ain't It Sad"	149	non album single
1990	"I Just Want My Fun"	96	Exploding White Mice
