= List of shipwrecks in 1984 =

The list of shipwrecks in 1984 includes ships sunk, foundered, grounded, or otherwise lost during 1984.

table of contents
1984
Jan	Feb	Mar	Apr
May	Jun	Jul	Aug
Sep	Oct	Nov	Dec
Unknown date

== January ==
=== 1 January ===
List of shipwrecks: 1 January 1984
Ship	State	Description
Keta	United States	The fishing vessel was destroyed by fire at Olsen Island (60°52′15″N 147°33′30″W) on the south-central coast of Alaska.
Kristen	United States	The fishing vessel was destroyed by fire and sank off a location identified as "Esther Island Light" on the coast of Alaska. The wreck report does not specify whether the incident occurred off the Esther Island Light in Prince William Sound on the south-central coast of Alaska or off the Esther Island Light (57°50′45″N 136°26′00″W) at the south end of Lisianski Stait in the Alexander Archipelago in Southeast Alaska.
Rare Earth	United States	The pleasure craft sank after colliding with an iceberg in Columbia Bay (60°56′30″N 147°05′30″W) on the south-central coast of Alaska.

=== 3 January ===
List of shipwrecks: 3 January 1984
Ship	State	Description
Fairplay X	West Germany	The tug ran aground in the Hayle estuary, Cornwall, United Kingdom.

=== 5 January ===
List of shipwrecks: 5 January 1984
Ship	State	Description
Mahajak Progress	Thailand	The cargo ship caught fire off Sattahip and was abandoned. Later declared a constructive total loss and was scrapped.

=== 16 January ===
List of shipwrecks: 16 January 1984
Ship	State	Description
Pergo	Netherlands	The cargo ship was abandoned in the North Sea off Norway. She sailed crewless on auto-pilot for 200 nautical miles (370 km) and ran aground south of Dunbar, East Lothian. The ship was salvaged and taken to Leith.

=== 22 January ===
List of shipwrecks: 22 January 1984
Ship	State	Description
Mary Lou	United States	The 86-foot (26.2 m) fishing trawler capsized and sank with the loss of two lives off Cape Decision on the coast of Southeast Alaska after a large wave struck her. There were three survivors.

=== 24 January ===
List of shipwrecks: 24 January 1984
Ship	State	Description
Radiant Med	Liberia	The cargo ship foundered off Guernsey, Channel Islands after a hatch cover was smashed in heavy seas. Seventeen of the 26 crew were lost. Nine survivors were rescued by the frigate Casabianca (Marine Nationale) and taken to St Peter Port.

=== 26 January ===
List of shipwrecks: 2 January 1984
Ship	State	Description
Navena	United Kingdom	The 33.41-metre (109.6 ft) fishing vessel sprung a leak and developed a list in severe weather off Flamborough Head and was abandoned. The crew were rescued by a Royal Air Force helicopter. The vessel was towed to Scarborough the next day where she was beached, later capsizing. Salvage attempts in March failed. Salvaged in May and taken to Tees and declared a constructive total loss and beached 27 May.

== February ==
=== 1 February ===
List of shipwrecks: 1 February 1984
Ship	State	Description
Skaros	United Kingdom	Iran–Iraq War: The bulk carrier was struck by an Iraqi Exocet missile in the Bandar Imam Khomenei Channel and set on fire. Declared a constructive total loss, later scrapped

=== 7 February ===
List of shipwrecks: 7 February 1984
Ship	State	Description
Midnight Sun 1	Panama	The cargo ship foundered off Ouessant, France in a storm. Eight of the nineteen crew were lost.

=== 14 February ===
List of shipwrecks: 14 February 1984
Ship	State	Description
Kyowa Maru No. 11	Japan	The fishing trawler sank with the loss of 14 lives in the Bering Sea approximately 120 nautical miles (220 km; 140 mi) north of Atka Island in the Aleutian Islands after colliding with the vessel Anyo Maru No. 15 (Japan). There were eight survivors.

=== 15 February ===
List of shipwrecks: 15 February 1984
Ship	State	Description
Camilla Weston	United Kingdom	The coaster collided with a German ship in fog 8 nautical miles (15 km) off Cromer, Norfolk and sank. The five crew were rescued.

=== 25 February ===
List of shipwrecks: 25 February 1984
Ship	State	Description
Mia Dawn	United States	The seiner ran aground and sank in bad weather at Tolstoi Point (55°22′N 161°30′W) on the south coast of the Alaska Peninsula near Unga Island in the Shumagin Islands.
Pescasa-15	Nicaragua	Contra War: The fishing vessel was sunk by mines at El Bluff, Nicaragua. Two of her crewmen were wounded.
Pescasa-27	Nicaragua	Contra War: The fishing vessel was sunk by mines at El Bluff, Nicaragua. Seven of her crewmen were wounded and two were missing.

== March ==
=== 1 March ===
List of shipwrecks: 1 March 1984
Ship	State	Description
Charming	(United Kingdom) Jersey	Iran–Iraq War: The cargo ship was struck by an Iraqi missile and set on fire. The fourteen crew abandoned ship, which then ran aground at Bandar Khomenei.

=== 4 March ===
List of shipwrecks: 4 March 1984
Ship	State	Description
Becky Thatcher	United States	The historic sternwheel texas-deck paddle steamer, operating as a showboat theater, sank at her mooring in the Muskingum River at Marietta, Georgia, when low river water caused her hull to strike sharp submerged concrete rubble. She was refloated and repaired, and she returned to service in June 1985.

=== 12 March ===
List of shipwrecks: 12 March 1984
Ship	State	Description
Harjan	Norway	The whaler was wrecked off Finnmark.

=== 27 March ===
List of shipwrecks: 27 March 1984
Ship	State	Description
Unknown	Nicaragua	Contra War: Two unidentified shrimp boats were sunk by mines at Corinto, Nicaragua.

=== 29 March ===
List of shipwrecks: 29 March 1984
Ship	State	Description
Arcely Perez	Nicaragua	Contra War: The fishing vessel was sunk by mines at Corinto, Nicaragua.
Eldia	Malta	The cargo ship was driven ashore at Orleans, Massachusetts, United States in a hurricane. She was refloated two months later, and scrapped in 1985.
San Albino	Nicaragua	Contra War: The fishing vessel was sunk by mines at Corinto, Nicaragua.
Sea Vamp	United States	The fishing vessel capsized and sank near Sitka, Alaska.

=== 30 March ===
List of shipwrecks: 30 March 1984
Ship	State	Description
Ane Katrine	West Germany	The trawler was sunk off Jutland, Denmark after her nets were snagged by the Chilean submarine Simpson (Armada de Chile) which was then undergoing trials. The three crew were killed.

== April ==
=== 11 April ===
List of shipwrecks: 11 April 1984
Ship	State	Description
No 5 dumb hopper barge	Australia	A redundant hopper barge owned by the Government of South Australia was scuttled about 17.5 kilometres (10.9 mi) south east of Ardrossan in Gulf St Vincent in South Australia during April 1984 in order to create an artificial reef for recreational fishing use following the prohibition of access to the waters within 550 metres (1,800 ft) with the nearby wrecksite of Zanoni.

=== 20 April ===
List of shipwrecks: 20 April 1984
Ship	State	Description
Sonia	Spain	After the patrol vessel Aisling and an unidentified patrol vessel (both Irish Naval Service) caught her fishing illegally in Irish waters during a gale on the evening of 19 April and she fled, resulting in a five-hour chase in which the Irish vessels fired 596 rounds at her as warning shots before discontinuing pursuit, the 330-gross register ton fishing vessel sank in the Irish Sea off England about 45 nautical miles (83 km; 52 mi) northwest of Land's End. The cargo ship Achat (West Germany) rescued three members of her 16-person crew, and a Royal Air Force Sea King helicopter from RAF Brawdy picked up the other 13.

=== 26 April ===
List of shipwrecks: 26 April 1984
Ship	State	Description
Tadoussac	Canada	The lake freighter ran aground in the St. Clair River in heavy ice. The vessel was freed on 28 April.

=== 28 April ===
List of shipwrecks: 28 April 1984
Ship	State	Description
Sharon D	United States	During a voyage from Dillingham to Kodiak, Alaska, the fishing vessel flooded and sank in the Gulf of Alaska about 50 nautical miles (93 km; 58 mi) south of Kodiak after a large wave broke over her stern. A United States Coast Guard helicopter hoisted all three members of her crew off the roof of her wheelhouse before she sank.

== May ==
=== 15 May ===
List of shipwrecks: 15 May 1984
Ship	State	Description
Hermes	United States	The freighter, a former U.S. Navy buoy tender (254 GRT 1943), was sunk as an artificial reef one mile (1.6 km) off the south end of Bermuda.

=== 16 May ===
List of shipwrecks: 16 May 1984
Ship	State	Description
Unknown speedboats	Nicaragua	Contra War: Action off Lausika: Two Contra-operated "Piranha" speedboats were sunk by Nicaraguan Navy craft.

=== 27 May ===
List of shipwrecks: 27 May 1984
Ship	State	Description
Laleham	United Kingdom	The cargo ship was wrecked on the north coast of Sable Island, Nova Scotia, Canada.
Navena	United Kingdom	The damaged 33.41-metre (109.6 ft) fishing vessel was beached at Tees. She was later refloated 7 March, 1985 and taken to Sunderland for repairs. Eventually scrapped after being declared uneconomical to repair.

=== Unknown date ===
List of shipwrecks: unknown May 1984
Ship	State	Description
Unknown speedboat	Nicaragua	Contra War: A Contra-operated speedboat was sunk by Nicaraguan Air Force aircraft.

== June ==
=== 3 June ===
List of shipwrecks: 3 June 1984
Ship	State	Description
Buyuk Hun	Turkey	The ship was attacked by Iraqi fighter aircraft on 3 June 1984 while underway in ballast from Tutunciftlik, Turkey to Kharg Island, Iran. Two Exocet missiles hit the superstructure and the engine room, starting a fire, killing three crew members and injuring two. The vessel was later towed to Bushir, Iran, where the wreck was declared a total loss and sold to Taiwanese breakers in 1986.
Marques	United Kingdom	The barque sank off Bermuda with the loss of nineteen crew.

=== 8 June ===
List of shipwrecks: 8 June 1984
Ship	State	Description
Stena of Sitoo	United Kingdom	The schooner struck a floating object in the North Sea whilst on a voyage from Amsterdam, Netherlands to Lowestoft, Suffolk and was holed below the waterline. HMS Ambuscade (Royal Navy) went to her assistance. Pumps were flown out by helicopter and a lifeboat towed her in to Harwich, Essex.

=== 9 June ===
List of shipwrecks: 9 June 1984
Ship	State	Description
Silver Clipper	United States	The fishing vessel sank 28 nautical miles (52 km; 32 mi) northwest of Dutch Harbor, Alaska.

=== 20 June ===
List of shipwrecks: 20 June 1984
Ship	State	Description
HMS Jupiter	Royal Navy	The Leander-class frigate collided with London Bridge and was severely damaged.

=== 20 June ===
List of shipwrecks: 20 June 1984
Ship	State	Description
Charles H McKay	Australia	The hopper barge collided with Yeu Man (Panama) at Melbourne and sank. All eight crew were rescued.

== July ==
=== 17 July ===
List of shipwrecks: 17 July 1984
Ship	State	Description
HMS Devonshire	Royal Navy	The County-class destroyer was sunk as a target in the North Atlantic Ocean during exercises by the submarine HMS Splendid (Royal Navy).

=== 23 July ===
List of shipwrecks: 23 July 1984
Ship	State	Description
Irene Dawn	United States	The 42-foot (12.8 m) fishing vessel was destroyed by fire in Raspberry Strait (58°02′N 153°00′W) between Afognak Island and Raspberry Island in Alaska's Kodiak Archipelago. The fishing vessel Joanice T (United States) rescued everyone on board.
Wild Canary	United States	The 28-foot (8.5 m) cabin cruiser sank in Chatham Strait in the Alexander Archipelago in Southeast Alaska north of Port Alexander, Alaska, with the loss of one life.

=== 26 July ===
List of shipwrecks: 26 July 1984
Ship	State	Description
HMS Confiance	Royal Navy	The Confiance-class tug was sunk as a target in the North Sea.

=== 29 July ===
List of shipwrecks: 29 July 1984
Ship	State	Description
Arendsee	East Germany	South African Border War: The cargo ship was sunk in Luanda harbor by South African frogmen using limpet mines. Later raised but scuttled in open waters.
Columbus C.	Panama	The cruise ship rammed the harbour breakwater and sank at Cádiz, Spain.

=== 30 July ===
List of shipwrecks: 30 July 1984
Ship	State	Description
Alvenus	United Kingdom	The tanker ran aground off New Orleans, Louisiana, cracking the hull and spilling some of her 14,700,000 US gallons (56,000,000 L) of crude oil.

== August ==
=== 3 August ===
List of shipwrecks: 3 August 1984
Ship	State	Description
Euphoria	United States	The crab-fishing vessel capsized approximately 100 nautical miles (190 km; 120 mi) southeast of Yakutat, Alaska. Her crew of three survived.
Rosemary	United States	The 88-foot (26.8 m) fishing vessel burned and sank in Bristol Bay off Alaska.

=== 4 August ===
List of shipwrecks: 4 August 1984
Ship	State	Description
Wellwood	Cyprus	MV Wellwood The 122-metre (400.3 ft) motor cargo ship ran aground in 6 metres (20 ft) of water on Molasses Reef in the Key Largo National Marine Sanctuary in the Florida Keys about 6 nautical miles (11 km; 6.9 mi) south of Key Largo, Florida. She was refloated 12 days later.

=== 5 August ===
List of shipwrecks: 5 August 1984
Ship	State	Description
Vicky Lynn	United States	The 31-foot (9.4 m) seiner sank in the Gulf of Alaska near Cape Chiniak (57°37′N 152°10′W), on Kodiak Island after a large wave washed over her open deck. The United States Coast Guard rescued all four members of her crew, who had escaped the sinking vessel in a skiff.

=== 14 August ===
List of shipwrecks: 14 August 1984
Ship	State	Description
Golden Provider	United States	The 78-foot (23.8 m) fishing vessel sank in Bristol Bay 65 nautical miles (120 km; 75 mi) northwest of Port Heiden, Alaska. The fishing vessel Smaragd (United States) rescued her crew of four from a life raft.

=== 20 August ===
List of shipwrecks: 20 August 1984
Ship	State	Description
ChapeaSue	United States	The 69-foot (21.0 m) fish tender sank in the Gulf of Alaska near Hinchinbrook Entrance (60°20′N 146°50′W) on the south-central coast of Alaska.
Lavelta Lynn	United States	The fishing vessel sank 4 nautical miles (7.4 km; 4.6 mi) off Black Bay (59°31′N 150°13′W) in Southeast Alaska southwest of Seward, Alaska.

=== 21 August ===
List of shipwrecks: 22 August 1984
Ship	State	Description
Lady C	United States	The crab-fishing vessel sank in Kennedy Entrance (59°00′30″N 152°00′00″W) at the entrance to Cook Inlet near Perl Island on the south-central coast of Alaska.
Zingara	Italy	The cargo ship ran aground in the Straits of Tiran, Red Sea.

=== 24 August ===
List of shipwrecks: 24 August 1984
Ship	State	Description
Evelyn	United States	The fishing vessel sank near Chugach Island (59°07′N 151°40′W) on the south-central coast of Alaska.

=== 25 August ===
List of shipwrecks: 25 August 1984
Ship	State	Description
Mont Louis	France	The ro-ro cargo ship, on a voyage from Dunkirk, France to the Riga, Soviet Union, collided in dense fog 11 nautical miles (20 km) off Ostend, Belgium, with the ropax ferry Olau Britannia (West Germany), from Vlissingen, Netherlands, for Sheerness, United Kingdom. There were no crew or passenger casualties. Mont Louis' cargo included 30 special sealed barrels containing 225 tonnes (221 long tons) of uranium hexafluoride. The 30 containers were subsequently recovered undamaged.

== September ==
=== 2 September ===
List of shipwrecks: 2 September 1984
Ship	State	Description
Samantha G	United States	The 74-foot (22.6 m) vessel burned and sank off Alaska.

=== 3 September ===
List of shipwrecks: 3 September 1984
Ship	State	Description
Jeanie	United States	The fishing vessel burned and sank at Point Retreat (58°24′45″N 134°57′15″W) in Southeast Alaska northwest of Juneau, Alaska. The Alaska Marine Highway System ferry LeConte (United States) rescued her crew of two.

=== 12 September ===
List of shipwrecks: 12 September 1984
Ship	State	Description
Hilma Hooker	Colombia	The 236-foot (72 m), 1,026-ton cargo ship sank at anchor off Kralendijk, Bonaire, Netherlands Antilles.

=== 17 September ===
List of shipwrecks: 17 September 1984
Ship	State	Description
Sealuck	Malta	The cargo ship ran aground on a reef off Hamilton, Bermuda.

=== 28 September ===
List of shipwrecks: 28 September 1984
Ship	State	Description
Swanny	United States	The seiner was wrecked on the northeast tip of Montague Island at the entrance to Prince William Sound on the south-central coast of Alaska.

=== 30 September ===
List of shipwrecks: 30 September 1984
Ship	State	Description
Curlew	United States	While towing the vessel Kelly Ann (United States), the 48-foot (14.6 m) fishing vessel ran aground and sank near Herendeen Island (55°04′N 159°25′W) in Alaska's Shumagin Islands with the loss of three lives. Kelly Ann rescued her sole survivor.

== October ==
=== 2 October ===
List of shipwrecks: 2 October 1984
Ship	State	Description
Stella Croce	Panama	The bulk carrier collided with another Panamanian vessel and sank at Taichung, Taiwan. Eight crew reported to be missing.

=== 20 October ===
List of shipwrecks: 20 October 1984
Ship	State	Description
Sonia	Spain	The fishing trawler sank off the Cornish coast of Great Britain following a pursuit by Irish Naval Service patrol vessel LÉ Aisling; there were no casualties.

=== 29 October ===
List of shipwrecks: 29 October 1984
Ship	State	Description
Venus	Philippines	The ferry sank off Marinduque Island. Of the 242 people on board, 114 were rescued by two Philippine Navy ships and a fishing vessel.

== November ==
=== 2 November ===
List of shipwrecks: 2 November 1984
Ship	State	Description
Mar del Labrador	Spain	The fishing trawler sank in the Gulf of Alaska 25 nautical miles (46 km; 29 mi) southwest of Kodiak, Alaska. Her entire crew of 30 survived and was rescued by the fishing vessel Dona Genoveva (United States).

=== 5 November ===
List of shipwrecks: 5 November 1984
Ship	State	Description
Unidentified ferry	Philippines	Typhoon Agnes: The ferry capsized and sank off Romblon in the Philippines with the loss of 440 lives.

=== 13 November ===
List of shipwrecks: 13 November 1984
Ship	State	Description
Bottom Line	United States	The 98-foot (29.9 m) fishing trawler sank near the south end of Alaska's Kodiak Island approximately 50 nautical miles (93 km; 58 mi) south of Cape Chiniak (57°37′N 152°10′W). Her crew of five, wearing survival suits, was pulled from the water by three Polish fishing vessels.

=== 17 November ===
List of shipwrecks: 17 November 1984
Ship	State	Description
Cape Race	United States	The 145-to-150-foot (44.2 to 45.7 m) barge sank in 60 to 70 feet (18 to 21 m) of water in Long Island Sound 1.5 nautical miles (2.8 km; 1.7 mi) south of Sheffield Island near Norwalk, Connecticut. She apparently pulled the tug Celtic (United States), which was towing her, down with her, and her wreck remains connected to the wreck of Celtic by a towing hawser.
Celtic	United States	The 85-foot (25.9 m) tug sank in 60 to 70 feet (18 to 21 m) of water in Long Island Sound 1.5 nautical miles (2.8 km; 1.7 mi) south of Sheffield Island near Norwalk, Connecticut, with the loss of her entire crew of five, whose bodies were recovered by police divers. She apparently was pulled under by the barge she was towing, Cape Race (United States), when Cape Race sank. Celtic's wreck remains connected to the wreck of Cape Race by a towing hawser.

=== 20 November ===
List of shipwrecks: 20 November 1984
Ship	State	Description
Dotty G	United States	While at anchor during a gale, the seiner capsized and sank in Zaikof Bay (60°19′N 146°58′W) on the coast of Montague Island off Southcentral Alaska. An 11-year-old boy perished.

=== 21 November ===
List of shipwrecks: 21 November 1984
Ship	State	Description
Topeka	Panama	The cargo ship ran aground off Coatzacoalcos, Mexico and was wrecked with the loss of two of her 27 crew.

=== 22 November ===
List of shipwrecks: 22 November 1984
Ship	State	Description
Fylrix	United Kingdom	The coaster capsized and sank off Plymouth, Devon. Three crew rescued by a helicopter from RFA Engadine (Royal Navy) and landed on HMS Brilliant (Royal Navy). The remaining four crew were rescued by the Plymouth lifeboat.

=== 23 November ===
List of shipwrecks: 23 November 1984
Ship	State	Description
Mercedes I	Venezuela	The cargo ship was driven ashore at Palm Beach, Florida, during the late November 1984 nor'easter. She was later salvaged and sunk as an artificial reef in March 1985.

=== 27 November ===
List of shipwrecks: 27 November 1984
Ship	State	Description
Lena Wessels	West Germany	The coaster ran aground off Lowestoft, Suffolk, United Kingdom. The five crew were rescued by helicopter.

=== 29 November ===
List of shipwrecks: 29 November 1984
Ship	State	Description
USCGC Campbell	United States Coast Guard	USCGC Campbell The Treasury-class cutter was sunk as a target in the Pacific Ocean northwest of Kauai, Hawaii, at 22°48′N 160°06′W.

=== 30 November ===
List of shipwrecks: 30 November 1984
Ship	State	Description
Cimbria	United States	The 50-foot (15.2 m) crab-fishing vessel sank off Cape Trinity (56°44′51″N 154°08′47″W) near Egg Island (56°53′35″N 154°13′00″W) on the south coast of Alaska's Kodiak Island. A skiff from Akhiok, Alaska, rescued her crew of three.

== December ==
=== 5 December ===
List of shipwrecks: 5 December 1984
Ship	State	Description
Intrepid	United States	The fishing vessel was blown onto rocks and wrecked near Seguam Pass in the Aleutian Islands, 130 nautical miles (240 km; 150 mi) southwest of Dutch Harbor, Alaska. Other fishing vessels rescued her crew of five.

=== 7 December ===
List of shipwrecks: 7 December 1984
Ship	State	Description
Lady Chilel	Gambia	The ferry sank in the Gambia River at Ballingho. Four people were killed and twenty injured out of the 98 people on board.

=== 23 December ===
List of shipwrecks: 23 December 1984
Ship	State	Description
Mercury	Honduras	The coaster foundered off Tumpat, Malaysia (5°50′N 102°36′E). She was on a voyage from Songkhla to Singapore.

=== 29 December ===
List of shipwrecks: 29 December 1984
Ship	State	Description
Nes Puk	West Germany	The cargo ship ran aground in the River Suances, Spain. She was refloated on 7 January and returned to service.

=== Unknown date ===
List of shipwrecks: Unknown date 1984
Ship	State	Description
Permeke	Belgium	The cargo ship ran aground in the River Scheldt at Hansweert. She was refloated with assistance from 10 tugs and returned to service.

== Unknown date ==
List of shipwrecks: Unknown date 1984
Ship	State	Description
Guayra	Argentina	The floating hotel was destroyed by fire at Puerto Piramide.
Machitis	Hellenic Navy	The Algerine-class minesweeper was sunk as a target off Crete.
Suffolk Maid	Unknown	The 122.75-foot (37.41 m), 302-ton former trawler that was being converted into a cargo ship went aground at St. Croix during a hurricane. Refloated and scuttled in Butler Bay in December 1985.
Warren P. Marks	United States	The Liberty ship was scuttled off the coast of North Carolina.

== See also ==
- Lists of shipwrecks
