= D'Amore-McKim School of Business =

Business school of Northeastern University

Coordinates: 42.340°N 71.088°W

Northeastern University D'Amore-McKim School of Business
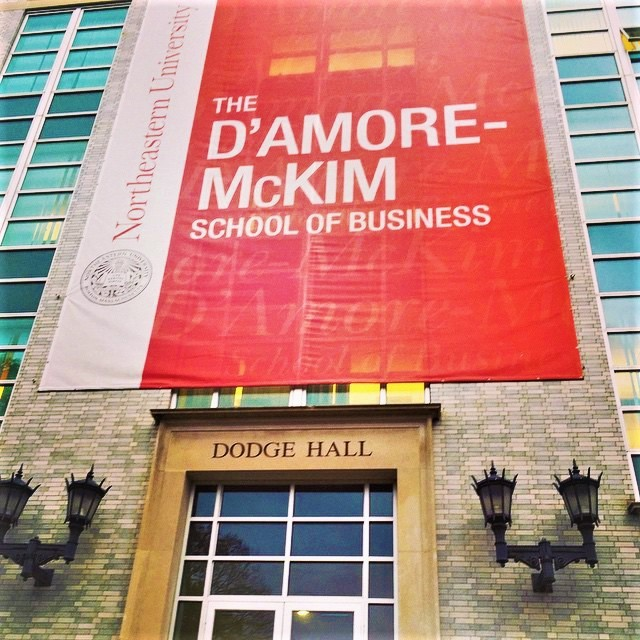
- The D'Amore-McKim School of Business at Northeastern University
- Type: Private
- Established: 1922
- Affiliations: Northeastern University
- Dean: Emery Trahan; Interim Dunton Family Dean
- Faculty: 205
- Undergraduates: 5,054
- Postgraduates: 1,548
- Location: Boston, Massachusetts, U.S.
- Campus: Urban
- Website: damore-mckim.northeastern.edu

The D'Amore-McKim School of Business is the business school of Northeastern University in Boston, Massachusetts. The business program was founded in 1922, followed by the Graduate School of Business Administration in 1952.

Northeastern University's cooperative education program, which allows students to alternative semesters of study and full-time professional experience, works with more than 4,000 employers in nearly 50 countries around the world.

The D'Amore-McKim School has more than 50,000 living alumni, including graduates from both the graduate and undergraduate programs, in 137 countries globally.

== History ==
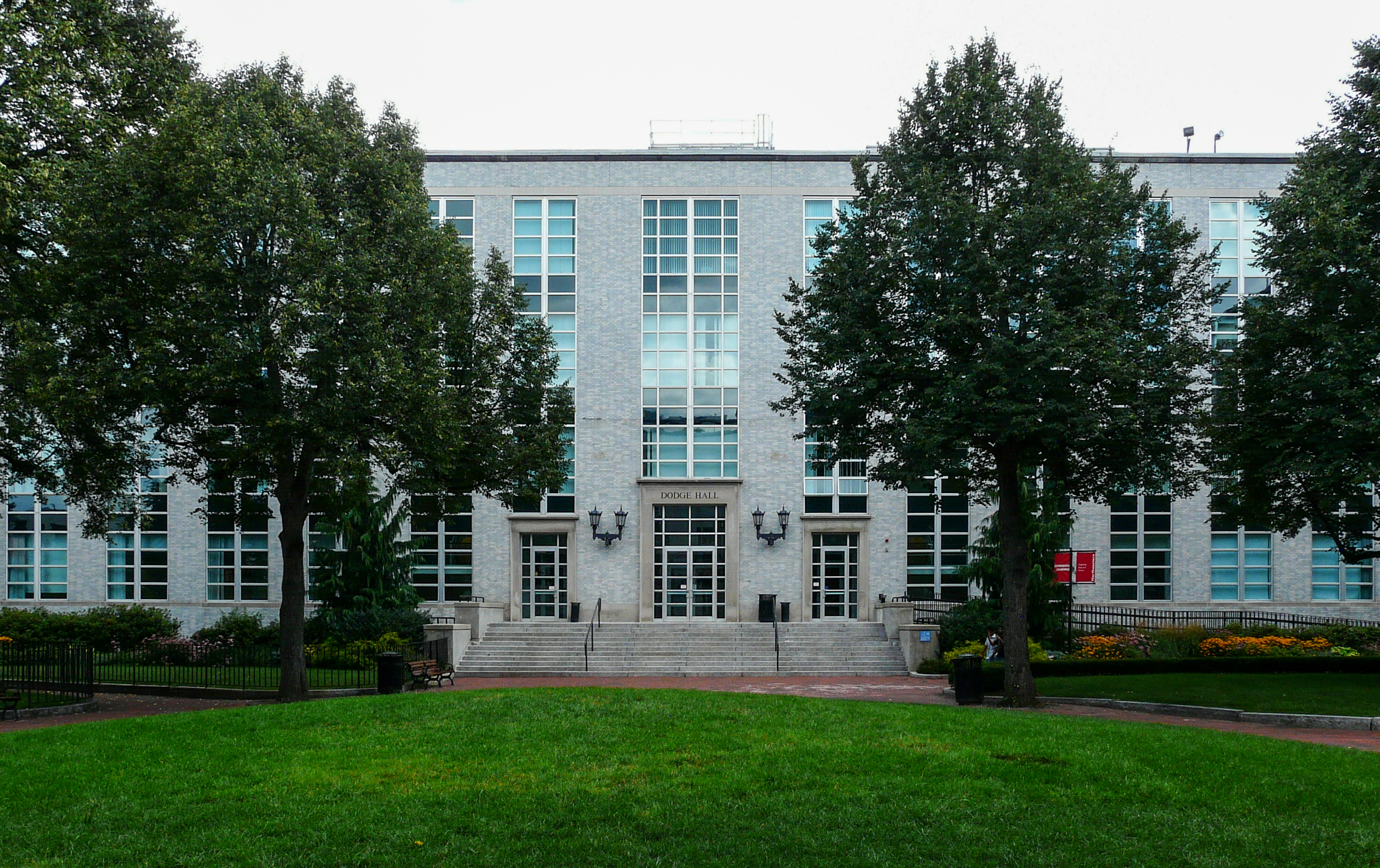
Dodge Hall

The D'Amore-McKim School of Business can trace its history back to the earliest days of Northeastern's existence, when commerce and industry courses were offered in 1907 by the School of Commerce and Finance of the Boston Young Men's Christian Association (YMCA). The fundamental aim of the school was to provide students with courses in commerce, accounting and finance in preparation for business positions. During that first year, 25 courses were offered, 18 instructors were hired and 208 students enrolled. Through evening study, B.C.S. and M.C.S degrees were eventually offered. After years of consideration, a School of Business Administration opened in September 1922, offering courses in general business, industrial management, marketing, finance and accounting. The first two years of the four-year program were devoted to learning sound business principles and the last two years were dedicated to specialization leading to definite marketable skills. The first MBA program was launched in 1951 as part of an Evening Division, and in 1958 the program became part of the Graduate School.

The business school is housed in Dodge Hall on Krentzman Quadrangle off Huntington Avenue in Boston. Constructed in 1952, it was named for Robert Gray Dodge, chairman of Northeastern's Board of Trustees from 1936 to 1959. The basement of the five-story building once housed the university's main library, from 1952 until 1990, when Snell Library opened.

=== Naming donation ===
On September 12, 2012, Northeastern University announced a $60 million gift by alumni Richard D'Amore and Alan McKim, as "the largest philanthropic investment in the university's history...[and] the fourth-largest gift to name a business school in the United States." As a result of the gift, Northeastern's College of Business Administration was renamed the D'Amore-McKim School of Business. It was the first college or school to be named at Northeastern.

== Academics ==
In the fall 2023, the D'Amore-McKim School had 6,602 total students, including 5,054 undergraduate students and 1,548 graduate students. Nearly 31 percent of students hail from more than 100 countries outside of the U.S.

The school reports that 99 percent of undergraduate students completed at least one co-op placement, including 49 percent who completed two co-op experiences and 34 percent who completed three experiences. Nearly 91 percent of undergraduates completed degree requirements in 6 years or less, after taking advantage of the co-op program. It also reports that 100 percent of graduate students in the full-time MBA program completed at least one corporate residency placement at a leading company or startup and that 100 percent of graduate students in the Master of Science (MS) in Accounting/MBA program completed a corporate residency placement at one of the Big Four or Global Five accounting firms.

The D'Amore-McKim School's undergraduate programs offers BSBA and BSIB degrees and the graduate school offers MS and MBA degrees. Master of Science degrees are offered in Accounting, Taxation, Finance, International Business, and Technological Entrepreneurship. The school also offers several certificates including Advanced Study in Management, Supply Chain Management, and Technological Entrepreneurship. The D'Amore-McKim School of Business is accredited by the Association to Advance Collegiate Schools of Business (AACSB).

MBA Programs

The full-time MBA is a 60-credit program that can be completed in 24 months of full-time study, including a six-month paid corporate residency. The curriculum has a globalization requirement which is fulfilled through the Global Projects Course, an international consulting project. Students complete a required course curriculum in their first year followed by an elective based curriculum determined by their chosen career track in their second year. Career tracks include Finance, Marketing, and Operations & Supply Chain Management.

The school also offers High Tech MBA, Online MBA, Online MSF, Online MST and Executive MBA programs. In addition to their MBA and MS programs, Northeastern offers dual degrees combining the MBA degree with an MS or JD. Dual degree programs include MS Finance/MBA, MS Accounting/MBA, MS Nursing/MBA, and JD/MBA. The MS Finance/MBA and MS Accounting/MBA are obtained solely through the D'Amore-McKim School of Business, while the MS Nursing/MBA and the JD/MBA are obtained jointly through the School of Nursing and School of Law, respectively.

== Rankings ==
Business school rankings

United States
- QS MBA: 71
- Bloomberg MBA: 58
- USNWR MBA: 68

Global
- QS MBA: 201–250

In 2013, the undergraduate business school ranked 25th in the nation according to Business Week and in 2014 it ranked 19th. Northeastern also ranked No. 4 in Forbes magazine as one of "America's Most Entrepreneurial Campuses." The EMBA program is ranked in the top 50 in the U.S. by the Financial Times and No. 21 in the nation by US News. The Finance Department is ranked No. 2 in the nation by Advances in Financial Education in terms of the number of publications in financial journals. In addition, undergraduate students have dominated case competitions against other Boston area business schools, winning nine of the last 11 Business School Beanpot competitions. The full-time MBA program was ranked #51 in the 2012 Bloomberg Businessweek report. The program moved up five places since the last report published in 2010. Employer surveys have moved the Program from #57 to #48 nationally.

== Notable Alumni ==
- Alan Mckim - Founder, Clear Harbors.
