= The Good China =

Studio album by Icecream Hands
- Released: 21 May 2007
- Recorded: January–March 2007
- Studio: Sing Sing Studios, Melbourne
- Genre: Rock
- Length: 42:07
- Label: Dust Devil Music
- Producer: Jimi Maroudas and East Van Parks

Icecream Hands chronology
You Can Ride My Bike: The Best of the Icecream Hands (2004)	The Good China (2007)	No Weapon But Love (2020)

Professional ratings
Review scores
Source	Rating
The Herald Sun	3.5/5 stars
Sunday Herald Sun	3/5 stars
The Age	4/5 stars
The Courier-Mail	4/5 stars
The Australian	4/5 stars

The Good China is the fifth studio album by Australian rock band Icecream Hands. It was released in 2007. The credits on the liner notes included a fictional producer, East Van Parks. Guitarist Charles Jenkins explained: "We were jealous of bands being able to afford big-name producers so we were forced to invent our own. We were driving near Albury and saw this van park, Easts, so East Van Parks it became. It's been really enjoyable having this fictional character as our producer. Sometimes when we reach a crossroads, we say, 'What would East do here?' "

Jenkins, until then the band's main songwriter, stepped back on the album, writing or contributing to just five of the album's 11 songs. "This is more (bassist Douglas Lee Robinson's) record," he told The Age. "He really forced it through. I enjoyed making this record, because I could lie on the couch in the studio, and didn't have to be there every day. These days other people are writing the songs, so they have more of a say." Guitarist Marcus Goodwin noted that Jenkins had taken "a bit of a back seat" because the two solo albums he had released since the previous Icecream Hands album had given him more of an outlet for his own material. "He feels the band has been together a long time, we're all songwriters in our own way and he has opened it up a bit more," he said.

One of Jenkins' songs, the acoustic ballad "My Mother Was a Dancer", concludes the album. Jenkins said he was attempting to write a country song for his publishing company but was unable to get the track working musically in that form. "I thought it could be a quiet folk song that could end China. Doug got hold of it and put the Beach Boys on it. I wasn't sure if that's what I wanted, but it ended up working beautifully."

Jenkins said "In the Back Seat of a Stolen Car" had its beginnings when the song's co-writer, John Harley, offered up the opening line: "Last night I cried myself to sleep in the back seat of a stolen car." Jenkins said: "I don't know if other writers do this, but it helps me write the song when I imagine someone else singing it. Because of that line I had a Lucinda Williams-type voice singing it. As I was writing it John gave me the line that brought it home, 'Last night I jumped through a stained-glass window in my wedding gown'. Then it made sense, I knew why she was in the back seat of the stolen car."

== Track listing ==
1. "Come Along" (Douglas Lee Robertson, Marcus Goodwin) — 3:51
2. "In the Back Seat of a Stolen Car" (Charles Jenkins, John Harley) — 4:26
3. "Holding On" (Goodwin) — 3:40
4. "Say That You Want Me Some More" (Jenkins) — 2:01
5. "Anyway" (Robertson) — 3:28
6. "Launceston" (Jenkins) — 5:17
7. "Everything You Are" (Derek G. Smiley, Douglas Lee Robertson) — 3:37
8. "Weak at the Knees" (Jenkins) — 4:19
9. "This is What I Want" (Goodwin) — 3:31
10. "Everyone's Waiting" (Robertson) — 4:23
11. "My Mother Was a Dancer" (Jenkins) — 3:27

== Personnel ==
- Marcus Goodwin — guitar
- Charles Jenkins — guitar, vocals
- Douglas Lee Robertson — bass, vocals
- Derek G. Smiley — drums, vocals

=== Additional personnel ===
- Matthew Vehl — piano, keyboards
- East Van Parks — glockenspiel ("Come Along")
