= Broken UFO =

Studio album by Icecream Hands
- Released: August 2002
- Recorded: 2001–2002
- Studios: Yikesville, Melbourne
- Genre: Rock
- Length: 52:49
- Label: Rubber Records
- Producers: Shane O'Mara and East Van Parks

Icecream Hands chronology
Sweeter Than the Radio (1999)	Broken UFO (2002)	You Can Ride My Bike: The Best of the Icecream Hands (2004)

Professional ratings
Review scores
Source	Rating
The Age	4/5 stars
The Age	4/5 stars
The Courier-Mail	4.5/5 stars
The Herald Sun	3.5/5 stars

Broken UFO is the fourth album by Australian rock band Icecream Hands. It was released in August 2002.

A single, "Rain Hail Shine", was nominated for the ARIA Award for Best Independent Release at the ARIA Music Awards of 2002.

== Track listing ==
(All songs by Charles Jenkins except where noted)

1. "Broken UFO" — 3:05
2. "Coming After You Again" — 4:42
3. "Beautiful Fields" — 3:15
4. "Head Down" (Marcus Goodwin) — 3:33
5. "Stay in the Same Room" — 3:35
6. "The Diplomat's Daughter" — 4:00
7. "Why'd You Have to Leave Me This Way" — 3:27
8. "When the Show is Over" (Douglas Lee Robertson) — 4:05
9. "Because You're Young" — 4:02
10. "Come Down Come Down" — 3:11
11. "Rain Hail Shine" — 3:44
12. "Waterproof" — 3:51
13. "Leaving All the Best" — 4:08
14. "Happy in the Sky" (Robertson) — 4:11

== Personnel ==
- Marcus Goodwin — guitar
- Charles Jenkins — guitar, vocals
- Douglas Lee Robertson — bass, vocals
- Derek G. Smiley — drums, vocals

=== Additional personnel ===
- Garrett Costigan — pedal steel
- Ian Whitehurst — saxophones
- Eugene Ball — trumpet
- Stephanie Lindner — violin
- Caerwen Martin — cello
- Shane O'Mara — guitar
- Rebecca Barnard — backing vocals
- Matthew Vehl — hammond organ

== Charts ==
Chart (2002)	Peak position
Australian Albums (ARIA)	84
