= Alan McKim =

American businessman

- Born: United States
- Education: MBA
- Alma mater: Northeastern University
- Occupation: Businessman
- Years active: 1980 to present
- Known for: Founder, Chairman, and CEO of Clean Harbors
- Awards: Honorary Doctorate, Massachusetts Maritime Academy

Alan S. McKim is an American businessman and the founder, chairman, and CEO of Clean Harbors Environmental Services, Inc., the leading provider of environmental, energy and industrial services throughout North America, in 1980. In January 2012, Alan McKim's Family Foundation donated $5 million to the South Shore Hospital of Weymouth. He is also a member of the board of trustees at Northeastern University and on 12 September 2012, he joined Richard D'Amore to donate $60 million to the College of Business Administration. It was the 4th largest donation to a business school in US history. In honour of the donation, Northeastern renamed its business school to the D’Amore-McKim School of Business.
