= Icecream Hands =

Australian musical group

- Origin: Melbourne, Victoria, Australia
- Genre: Power pop
- Years active: 1992–2004, 2007–2008, 2011, 2019
- Labels: Rubber; Shock; BMG; Not Lame; Dust Devil
- Spinoff of: The Mad Turks from Istanbul
- Members: Charles Jenkins; Derek G Smiley; Douglas Lee Robertson; Marcus Goodwin
- Past members: Arch Larizza; Dom Larizza
- Website: icecreamhands.com.au

Icecream Hands (also seen as Ice Cream Hands) are a power pop band formed in Melbourne, Victoria in 1992 as Chuck Skatt and His Icecream Hands with Charles "Chuck Skatt" Jenkins as lead singer-songwriter and rhythm guitarist, Arturo "Arch" Larizza on bass guitar, his brother Dom "Benedictine III" Larizza on lead guitar and Derek Smiley on drums. They shortened the name and released a self-titled extended play on Rubber Records in 1992. After a year Douglas Lee Robertson had replaced Arch on bass guitar.

In 1997 Marcus Goodwin replaced Dom on lead guitar and their second album, Memory Lane Traffic Jam was released in the United States (US) on Not Lame Recordings; it was acclaimed by AllMusic reviewer, Stephen Thomas Erlewine as "immediately catchy, but [the songs] grow stronger upon each listen – a hallmark of a truly fine pop album." They were twice nominated for an Australian Recording Industry Association (ARIA) Music Awards.

While on hiatus from 2004-2007, Jenkins pursued his solo career before briefly reuniting the band which released another album, The Good China, in 2007. Jenkins then issued his third solo album in 2008, while other band members became involved in separate projects.

== History ==
=== 1992–1998: Travelling... Made Easy and Memory Lane Traffic Jam ===
Charles Jenkins had been a solo artist in Adelaide where, as Chuck Skatt, he formed The Mad Turks from Istanbul as their vocalist in 1984 with Dominic Larizza (as Dom Benedictine III) on drums and later on guitar, Martyn Christopher on bass guitar and Matthias Eckhardt on guitar. The band relocated to Melbourne by 1989, renamed as The Mad Turks after Eckhardt left, Jenkins took up rhythm guitar, and they disbanded there in 1991. Jenkins and Larizza recruited his brother Arturo "Arch" Larizza (ex-The Saints) on bass guitar and Derek Smiley on drums to form Chuck Skatt and His Icecream Hands in 1992. The name was shortened to Icecream Hands which Jenkins took from the lyrics of a 1984 Robyn Hitchcock song "Flavour of Night" (from I Often Dream of Trains) and is an English term for masturbation. Their debut release, Ice Cream Hands was a six-track Extended play (EP) on independent label Rubber Records and distributed by Shock Records.

In 1993 they released a full-length album, Travelling... Made Easy, and Douglas Robertson replaced Arch Larizza on bass guitar—Arch re-united with Chris Bailey (ex-The Saints) in Bailey's backing band. Travelling... Made Easy was released in Europe in 1995 on Blue Rose Records with four additional tracks and was described as "quite an accomplished and ambitious effort". In Australia they released their second EP, Supermarket Scene in 1994 followed by two more EPs Olive in November 1995 and Here We Go 'Round Now in July 1997. On 11 June 1997 the band performed on the RMITV show Under Melbourne Tonight.

In 1997 they released their second full-length album, Memory Lane Traffic Jam. By then Rubber Records was being distributed by BMG and the album was released in the United States on Not Lame Recordings. Three bonus tracks were added to the US release, which was acclaimed by AllMusic reviewer, Stephen Thomas Erlewine as "immediately catchy, but [the songs] grow stronger upon each listen -- a hallmark of a truly fine pop album".

=== 1999–2003: Sweeter Than the Radio and Broken UFO ===
Sweeter Than the Radio, co-produced by Icecream Hands and Wayne Connolly, was released in 1999. Just prior to the recording of the album, Marcus Goodwin (ex-Yolk) had replaced Dom Larizza on lead guitar. One of the singles, "Nipple" was written by Jenkins about an early girlfriend who attracted his attention at a bus stop. With a lack of commercial success they nevertheless achieved critical acclaim when the album was nominated for the ARIA Award for Best Adult Contemporary Album in 2000. Their next album, Broken UFO, produced by Shane O'Mara and East Van Parks, contained the track, "Rain, Hail, Shine" which was nominated for the ARIA Award for Best Independent Release at the ARIA Music Awards of 2002.

=== 2004–2006: Hiatus ===
In 2004, Rubber Records released a 2×CD greatest hits collection, You Can Ride My Bike: The Best of the Icecream Hands.

While on hiatus, Jenkins pursued his solo career to release two albums, Bungalow (2004) and The City Gates (2005) on Parole Records.

=== 2007–present: Occasional reformations and solo careers ===
Icecream Hands briefly reunited for The Good China, released in 2007 on the independent label Dust Devil Music. Jenkins returned to his solo work and released Blue Atlas on Dust Devil Music in 2008. Robertson (as "Doug Root") joined Melbourne-based alternative rock group Root! in 2008, he had guested on their debut album, Root! (2007). They released a second album, Get Up Yourself in 2009. Smiley also briefly joined ROOT as Smiley Root and recorded Surface Paradise with them before moving to his next project Buff Uncle. As from January 2010, Goodwin and Smiley performed briefly as a duo, Buff Uncle.

In early 2019, the band reformed for a tour commemorating the 20th anniversary of the release of "Sweeter Than The Radio". On August 21, 2020, they released No Weapon But Love, their first album in 13 years. Due to COVID-19 lockdowns, the band were unable to perform an album launch until January 2021, when they played at the Northcote Social in Melbourne.

== Members ==
- Charles Jenkins – vocals, guitar
- Derek Smiley – drums, vocals
- Douglas Lee Robertson – bass guitar, vocals
- Marcus Goodwin – guitar, vocals

== Discography ==
=== Studio albums ===
Title	Details	Peak chart positions
Title	Details	AUS
Travelling... Made Easy	Released: 1993; Label: Rubber Records (RUB029); Format: CD	—
Memory Lane Traffic Jam	Released: August 1997; Label: Rubber Records/BMG (74321511622); Format: CD	—
Sweeter Than the Radio	Released: 1999; Label: Rubber Records/BMG (74321693132); Format: CD	—
Broken UFO	Released: August 2002; Label: Rubber Records (RUB142); Format: CD	84
The Good China	Released: May 2007; Label: Dust Devil Music (DDCD0107); Format: CD	—
No Weapon But Love	Released: August 2020; Label: Self-released (ICH 101); Format: CD, LP, streaming	—
Giant Fox Pineapple Tree	Released: 7 November 2025; Label: Self-released (ICH 102); Format: CD, LP, streaming	38

=== Compilation albums ===
List of compilation albums, with selected details
Title	Details
You Can Ride My Bike: The Best of the Icecream Hands	Released: 2004; Label: Rubber (RUB189); Format: 2×CD

=== Extended plays ===
List of extended plays, with selected details
Title	Details
Ice Cream Hands	Released: 1992; Label: Rubber (RUB023); Format: CD
Supermarket Scene	Released: 1994; Label: Rubber (RUB036); Format: CD
Olive	Released: 1995; Label: Rubber (RUB045); Format: CD

== Awards and nominations ==
=== ARIA Music Awards ===
The ARIA Music Awards is an annual awards ceremony that recognises excellence, innovation, and achievement across all genres of Australian music.

Year	Nominee / work	Award	Result	Ref.
2000	Sweeter Than the Radio	Best Adult Contemporary Album	Nominated	
2002	"Rain Hail Shine"	Best Independent Release	Nominated	
