= Susan Benjamin =

American historian

Susan Benjamin has researched communications and the cultural and political history of food for almost 40 years. She is founder of True Treats, the nation's only research-based candy and confection store, which was listed by Food Network magazine, delish.com and Holiday Lettings, Trip Advisor's international arm, as one of the nation's top 50 “Sweet Spots.” A former communications strategist and college professor, she participated in a White House initiative under Bill Clinton and George W. Bush, and has written nine books on related subjects, and published in legal journals, newspapers and online publications.

== Education ==
Susan studied philosophy and writing at Boston University and Bennington College and received her master's degree in Writing where she worked with her mentor, C.Michael Curtis, former senior editor of The Atlantic. As a college professor and consultant, she mentored PhDs at Harvard and MIT, and taught at Emerson College and in the academics department of Berklee College of Music.

== Works ==
Ms. Benjamin founded True Treats in 2010. Benjamin's 10th book, Sweet as Sin: The Unwrapped Story of How Candy Became America’s Pleasure, (Rowman & Littlefield, 2016) covers North America's history of candies and confections. Benjamin describes these candy stories as rich and deep, from a national, political, and human rights level. It also made the Smithsonian's "Best of Books about Food" for 2016. More recently, she has discussed the history of candy and confections on National Public Radio, Voice of America, ABC News Hour Radio, CNBC, The History Channel and many more. Articles featuring Ms. Benjamin have appeared in such places as Salon.com, the Huffington Post, Vice/Munchies.com, the Arizona Republic, the Sacramento Bee, Woman’s Day and Bon Appetit, among many others. Ms. Benjamin gives book signings and presentations at museums, historical societies and other venues throughout the nation, including the Smithsonian Museum of American History, the Deadwood Museum in South Dakota, and the Mount Vernon Gardens and Hotel, where the New York Times cited her talk as one of the top five events of the weekend.
