= You Can Ride My Bike: The Best of the Icecream Hands =

Compilation album by Icecream Hands
- Released: December 2004
- Genre: Rock
- Label: Rubber Records

Icecream Hands chronology
Broken UFO (2002)	You Can Ride My Bike: The Best of the Icecream Hands (2004)	The Good China (2007)

You Can Ride My Bike is a compilation album by Australian rock band Icecream Hands. It was released in 2004. The album was released as both a single disc—with all but one of the tracks taken from the band's first four albums—and a double disc containing b-sides and outtakes.

== Track listing ==
=== Disc one ===
(All songs by Charles Jenkins except where noted)

1. "The Way She Drives" — 1:55
2. "The Ocean Floor" — 4:35
3. "Home" — 3:18
4. "Supermarket Scene" — 2:45
5. "Winter's Tune" — 3:21
6. "Paper Bird" — 3:10
7. "Olive" — 2:39
8. "Here We Go 'Round Now" — 3:57
9. "Dodgy" (Charles Jenkins, Douglas Lee Robertson) — 2:44
10. "Spirit Level Windowsill" — 2:27
11. "Nipple" — 3:40
12. "Yellow and Blue" (Robertson) — 2:32
13. "Gasworks Park" — 5:18
14. "Picture Disc From the Benelux" (Derek G. Smiley, Douglas Lee Robertson, Charles Jenkins) — 3:17
15. "The Obvious Boy" — 3:26
16. "Rain Hail Shine" — 3:44
17. "Broken UFO" — 3:06
18. "Beautiful Fields" — 3:15
19. "Head Down" (Marcus Goodwin) — 3:33
20. "Why'd You Have to Leave Me This Way?" — 3:27
21. "When the Show is Over" (Robertson) — 4:06
22. "Music by the Metre" — 4:05

=== Disc two ===
(All songs by Charles Jenkins)

1. "Sanity Can" — 1:51
2. "Riverside" — 2:49
3. "Sobersides" — 3:03
4. "Struggle Town" — 2:20
5. "Bend" — 2:06
6. "Early Morning Frost" — 4:24
7. "Miller" — 2:40
8. "Visiting Girl" — 3:18
9. "Ed's General Store" — 2:56
10. "It's Always Going to Get You" — 4:20
11. "You Should Know By Now" — 3:20
12. "I Bet It's Warm Up There" — 3:15
13. "Three Minute Song" — 3:35
14. "Letterbox" — 2:55
15. "The Ballad of Human Nature" — 2:15
16. "Can You Slide" — 3:00
17. "Forest Hill" — 2:12
18. "When The Bullshit Comes" — 2:45
19. "Look At You Now" — 3:57
20. "Sometimes" — 3:22
21. "My Lights Are Green" — 3:31

== Personnel ==
- Marcus Goodwin — guitar
- Charles Jenkins — guitar, vocals
- Douglas Lee Robertson — bass, vocals
- Derek G. Smiley — drums, vocals
