= Safety-Kleen =

Industrial waste management company

Safety-Kleen Systems, Inc.
- Type: Subsidiary
- Industry: Industrial waste management
- Founded: 1963; 63 years ago, in Milwaukee, Wisconsin, U.S.
- Founder: Ben Palmer, Don Brinckman
- Headquarters: Richardson, Texas, U.S.
- Products: Parts washer, Oil Re-refining, Recycling, Motor oil recycling
- Revenue: $1+ billion
- Number of employees: 4,500
- Parent: Clean Harbors
- Website: www.safety-kleen.com

Safety-Kleen Systems, Inc. is a company that provides services such as collecting and recycling oil, providing industrial cleaning, and handling industrial waste. In addition, their products include cleaning equipment, antifreeze and coolant, windshield cleaner, and re-refined oil products.

== History ==
Safety-Kleen was started in the late 1950s and early 1960s when Ben Palmer invented the parts washer which he decided to lease to customers and service by removing and replenishing the solvent in the machines. In 1968, the Safety-Kleen business was acquired by Chicago Rawhide, and under the leadership of Don Brinckman Safety-Kleen became a publicly traded company and had significant growth for the next 30 years, eventually joining the Fortune 500. In 1973, a UK-based off-shoot of Safety-Kleen was created. And in 1998 Safetykleen Europe, without a hyphen, separated from the US organisation to become a separate company that now operates in 14 countries in Europe and beyond.

In 1998, Safety-Kleen fell victim to a hostile takeover by Laidlaw Environmental. Afterwards, the financial situation of the company deteriorated and finally the company filed for and re-emerged from Chapter 11 bankruptcy. In this period, the company concealed the challenges of the merger from the public, and in 2002, civil and criminal charges were filed by the SEC and the United States Attorney's Office against Safety-Kleen and four of its former senior executives for "perpetrating a massive accounting fraud from at least November 1998 through March 2000." A $200 million judgement was subsequently enforced by a Canadian court.

The company successfully emerged from bankruptcy and refinanced its senior debt in 2005.

In 2012, Clean Harbors acquired Safety-Kleen.

Safety-Kleen is also an official partner of NASCAR as part of the NASCAR green initiative.
