= Where's the Pope? =

- Origin: Adelaide, South Australia, Australia
- Genres: Hardcore punk, thrash metal
- Years active: 1985–1999, 2005, 2006
- Labels: Reactor, Greasy Pop, Resist
- Past members: see Members list below

Where's the Pope? were a hardcore punk band from Adelaide, South Australia formed in 1985 with mainstays Frank Pappagalo on vocals and Robert Stafford on bass guitar. In June 1988 they issued Straightedge Holocaust on Reactor Records and in March 1990, after some line-up changes, they released Sunday Afternoon BBQ's on Greasy Pop Records. In March 1999 their final album, PSI appeared on Resist Records before they disbanded that year. Reunion gigs occurred in 2005, 2006, 2023 and 2024.

== History ==
Where's the Pope? were a pioneering hardcore punk, thrash band formed in Adelaide, South Australia in 1985. The group were formed by Frank Pappagalo on vocals, Robert Stafford on bass guitar, Phil Curran on guitar and Phil Rady on drums. They became known for their energetic and chaotic live performances, and also for bringing a United States-type sound to the local punk scene. They released four albums, toured the eastern states on numerous occasions, supported international acts and played at two Big Day Out concert series, including a main stage performance in front of thousands of loyal and new fans. The popularity of Where's the Pope? led to increased acceptance of punk, hardcore bands into mainstream venues throughout Adelaide. Although the group went through many line-up changes they maintained an intensely loyal following among the skating and surfing fans, and southern and coastal areas of Australia. The group featured on skate or bmx videos including ones on Volatile Visions. In 1986 Curran was replaced on guitar by Geoff Goddard.

In June 1988, Where's the Pope? released an eight-track album, Straight-Edge Holocaust, on Reactor Records. At about this time, Rady was replaced on drums by Jacob Curtis. In March 1990, the line-up of Pappagalo, Stafford, Goddard and Curtis, issued their album, Sunday Afternoon BBQ's on Greasy Pop Records. According to Rhys Davies, on Kill from the Heart website, it was "different from the first record. Lyrically the record was devoted almost entirely to beer, while musically the band seemed to have shed its loose, hardcore edge". Soon after Goddard was replaced by Jack Jacomas on guitar and Curtis was replaced by Rady returning on drums, although he was replaced in turn by Scott Nadebaum. By 1992 Goddard had returned on guitar. In July 1994 they issued a self-titled six-track extended play with all the lyrics written by Pappagalo and music composed by the group. In 1994 Goddard was replaced by Scott Kivelhan on guitar. Alex Madigan on guitar replaced Kivelhan in 1998. In March 1999 the group issued their final album, PSI, which was produced by Tony Nesci for Resist Records.

The line up for their final show was: Frank Pappagalo on vocals, Rob Stafford on bass guitar, Scott Nadebaum on drums, Alex Madigan on guitar. The band split in 1999 just after releasing their final album, PSI, on Resist Records. One of their final shows was at the Holdfast Hotel in Glenelg and two more shows were scheduled to accommodate all the fans. Where's the Pope? reunited in January 2005 for a show at the Enigma Bar, Adelaide, selling out within an hour of the doors opening. Another reunion gig occurred in June 2006.

== Members ==
- Frank Pappagalo – vocals (1985- 2085)
- Robert Stafford – bass guitar (1985–1999)
- Phil Curran – guitar (1985–1986)
- Phil Rady – drums (1985–1988, 1990–1991)
- Geoff Goddard – guitar (1986–1990, 1992–1994)
- Jacob Curtis – drums (1988–1990)
- Scott Nadebaum – drums (1992–1999)
- Jack Jacomas – guitar (1990–1991)
- Scott Kivelhan – guitar (1994–1998)
- Alex Madigan – guitar (1998-1999)

== Discography ==
- Honk, I Am Jesus (May 1986, cassette self-release)
- Straight-Edge Holocaust (June 1988, Reactor Records MX300226)
- Sunday Afternoon BBQ's (March 1990, Greasy Pop GPR 149)
- Where's the Pope? (July 1994, self-release)
- PSI (March 1999, Resist Records)
