= Sweeter Than the Radio =

Studio album by Icecream Hands
- Released: 1999
- Recorded: January 1999
- Studio: Hothouse Studios, St Kilda
- Genre: Rock
- Length: 48:00
- Label: Rubber Records
- Producer: Icecream Hands, Wayne Connolly

Icecream Hands chronology
Memory Lane Traffic Jam (1997)	Sweeter Than the Radio (1999)	Broken UFO (2002)

Sweeter Than the Radio is the third album by Australian rock band Icecream Hands. It was released in 1999 and was nominated for the ARIA Award for Best Adult Contemporary Album at the ARIA Music Awards of 2000.

== Track listing ==
(All songs by Charles Jenkins except where noted)

1. "Can Anyone Be Hypnotised?" — 3:21
2. "Spiritlevel Windowsill" — 2:26
3. "Dodgy" (Charles Jenkins, Douglas Lee Robertson) — 2:40
4. "Rise, Fall & Roll" — 3:07
5. "Nipple" — 3:41
6. "Yellow & Blue" (Robertson) — 2:31
7. "Gasworks Park" — 5:18
8. "Picture Disc From the Benelux" (Derek G. Smiley, Douglas Lee Robertson, Charles Jenkins) — 3:18
9. "Bad Hip" — 3:07
10. "You Could Be Reported" — 4:12
11. "Giving It All Away" — 3:43
12. "Stupid Boy" — 3:05
13. "Magic Pudding Blues" — 1:54
14. The Obvious Boy" — 3:28
15. "Seawall" — 2:01

== Personnel ==
- Marcus Goodwin — guitar
- Charles Jenkins — guitar, vocals
- Douglas Lee Robertson — bass, vocals
- Derek G. Smiley — drums, vocals

=== Additional personnel ===
- David Owen — keyboards ("Can Anyone Be Hypnotised?", "Dodgy")
- Elroy Falcon — guitar ("Dodgy," "Bad Hip," "Magic Pudding Blues")
- Anita Quayle — cello
- Craig Harnath — keyboards ("Gasworks Park")
