= Clean Harbors =

American environmental company

Clean Harbors, Inc.
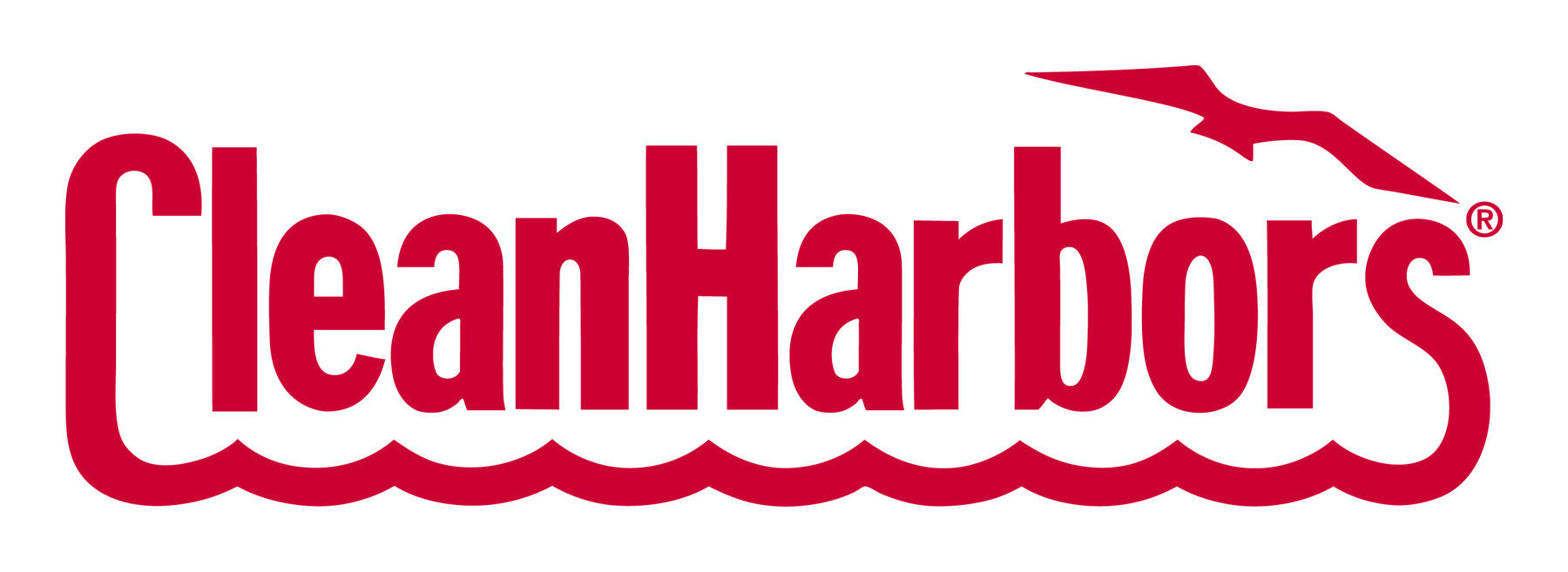
- Type: Public
- Traded as: NYSE: CLH; S&P 400 component
- Industry: Waste management
- Founded: 1980; 46 years ago
- Founder: Alan McKim
- Headquarters: Norwell, Massachusetts, U.S.
- Number of locations: 870
- Area served: United States; Canada
- Key people: Alan McKim (chairperson); Michael L. Battles (co-CEO and co-president); Eric W. Gerstenberg (co-CEO and co-president); Eric J. Dugas (CFO)
- Services: Environmental & Industrial
- Revenue: ▲US$6.03 billion (2025)
- Net income: ▼US$391 million (2025)
- Owner: Alan McKim (4.8%)
- Number of employees: 25,232 (2024)
- Subsidiaries: Safety-Kleen
- Website: cleanharbors.com

Clean Harbors, Inc., headquartered in Norwell, Massachusetts, is a provider of waste management and industrial services for commercial customers, specializing in the collection, transportation, treatment, and disposal of hazardous waste, but also offering services for non-hazardous waste. The company has 870 operating locations in 630 properties in the U.S. and Canada including a network of over 100 waste disposal facilities such as incinerators, landfills (seven hazardous waste landfills and two non-hazardous waste landfills), treatment, storage and disposal facilities. It also owns Safety-Kleen, the largest re-refiner and recycler of used oil in North America. In 2024, the company received 91% of its revenues in the United States and 9% of its revenues in Canada. In 2024, the company's revenues primarily came from the following industries: chemical industry (15%), manufacturing (14%), refineries (13%), automotive industry (8%), utilities (6%), base and blended oils (5%), oil and gas industry (5%), transportation (4%), government (4%) and retail (3%).

The company is ranked 586th on the Fortune 500.

== History ==
Clean Harbors was founded in 1980 in Brockton, Massachusetts, by Alan McKim as a four-person tank cleaning business.

In November 1987, the company became a public company via an initial public offering.

In 1984, the company removed 130,000 gallons of fuel oil from the tanker Eldia, which became the largest ship to have been beached off Cape Cod.

=== Acquisitions ===
#	Date	Company	Price	Description of Assets	Ref(s).
1	1989	Chem Clear		Aqueous waste treatment with facilities in Baltimore, Chicago and Cleveland; first major acquisition outside of New England.	
2	1995	Kimball, Nebraska Incinerator Facility		Waste incinerator facility acquired from Amoco; first RCRA-certified incinerator.	
3	February 2002	Chemical Services Division of Safety-Kleen	$46.3 million	55 service centers and 33 waste management facilities; expanded chemical and waste disposal services.	
4	August 2006	Teris	$52.7 million	Incinerator and treatment, storage and disposal facilities; extended reach to California.	
5	February 2008	Recycling facilities in Chicago and Hebron, Ohio from Safety-Kleen	$12.5 million in cash and the assumption of $3 million in liabilities		
6	August 2009	Eveready	C$464 million	Services for the oil and gas industry; expanded into Canada.	
7	June 2011	Peak Energy Services	C$$202 million	Oil and gas surface rentals for liquid, solid and sludge processing.	
8	December 2012	Safety-Kleen	US$1.25 billion	Used oil recycling and re-refining, and parts washers.	
9	April 2015	Thermo Fluids	$85 million	Recycles used oil, solvents and oil filters.	
10	September 2016	Emerald Services		Oil and wastewater recycling services.	
11	July 2017	Lonestar West	C$44 million	Daylighting and hydro excavation services.	
12	October 2021	HydroChemPSC	$1.25 billion	Provider of industrial cleaning, specialty maintenance and utilities services; acquired from Littlejohn & Co.	
13	May 2023	Thompson Industries	$110 million	Industrial service operations in the Southeastern United States.	
14	March 2024	Hepaco	$400 million	Environmental and emergency response capabilities.	
15	May 2024	Noble Oil Services		Industrial waste and wastewater services.	
16	May 2026	Terra Nova Solutions	$225 million	Used oil collection and vacuum gas oil re-refining.	
17	August 2026	EnviroServe	$470 million	End-to-end waste management and waste storage capabilities.	

== See also ==
- List of cleaning companies
- List of S&P 400 companies
