= Del Webb Explosion =

- Origin: Adelaide, South Australia
- Genres: Pop; Soul; Rock
- Years active: 1980–1983, 2025-
- Labels: Empty Dogma, Greasy Pop

Del Webb Explosion was an Australian seven-piece band active in Adelaide, South Australia, between 1981 and 1983. The group has been described as a brass-based pop band influenced by British soul and new wave acts, particularly the UK soul revival movement associated with bands such as Dexys Midnight Runners. The band was founded in 1980 by Peter Flierl, shortly after his return to Australia from the United Kingdom, where he had been influenced by contemporary British soul and pop music, including Dexys Midnight Runners and their offshoot group The Bureau. Del Webb Explosion performed its first live concert at the Union Hotel in Adelaide on 7 December 1981.[1] The band remained active for approximately 20 months, performing regularly on the local live music circuit until 1983. The name Del Webb Explosion was suggested by early guitarist Gerry Barrett. It was derived from the name of American construction magnate and real estate developer Delbert Eugene Webb, with the word “Explosion” added to complement the energetic style of the group.

== History ==
=== Beginning ===
Peter Flierl (bass guitar, backing vocals, songwriting) initiated the formation of the band by placing an advertisement in a local newspaper seeking musicians to form an eight-piece soul/pop group performing a mixture of original material and cover versions. Drummer Heinz Stein responded early to the advertisement and became an initial collaborator. Vocalist Mankyboddle, guitarist Barrett, and tenor saxophonist Pasetto joined soon afterwards, forming the core lineup.

Rehearsals began with several early compositions by Flierl alongside soul standards and a number of songs by Dexys Midnight Runners, primarily drawn from their debut album Searching for the Young Soul Rebels. The group’s early lineup was completed with the addition of trumpeters Daniel Clements and Rob Symons. The band made its live debut supporting local Adelaide group The Screaming Believers, at the Union Hotel. The performance introduced Del Webb Explosion to local audiences, after which the group performed regularly on the Adelaide live music circuit for approximately the following 12 months.

Although Pasetto contributed significantly to the arrangement of brass parts for Peter Flierl’s early compositions, he left the band prior to its initial recording sessions at the now-defunct Pepper Recording Studios in North Adelaide. Symons also departed the group around this time.

Following these departures, Del Webb Explosion recruited Burton on alto saxophone and Berrington on tenor saxophone. This lineup recorded the band’s debut single, “One Way Love”, backed with “Going Home”, at Pepper Recording Studios. The single was released on the local independent label Empty Dogma Records and achieved moderate sales within Adelaide, contributing to increased local recognition for the band.

To further promote the release, the band self-financed a music video filmed at various suburban locations around Adelaide. Although the group did not perform extensively outside the metropolitan area during this period, it maintained a regular live performance schedule, building a following through appearances at inner-city venues including the Tivoli Hotel, Angas Hotel, and frequent performances at the University of Adelaide Bar.

=== Middle ===
A heavy schedule of gigging from the outset created a level of interest from some of the major record labels in Adelaide. However, cracks were beginning to show in the band with some members clearly not having the same commitment as others. It was around this time that Barrett was replaced by Oldman on lead guitar duties. Although still unsigned, the band decided to foray into the studio a second time to record the Mankyboddle penned "Gardening as Finer Art" backed with Flierl's "Too Late The Hero". Funds were tighter this time around for the band which resulted in a 'live' rendition of "Too Late The Hero" (recorded some weeks earlier at an Adelaide Uni Bar gig) becoming the B-side. The new single was released on local alternative record label, Greasy Pop Records and despite not having a video clip to accompany it, continued to increase the profile of the band with record company representatives. Keyboardist, Glenn Errington also left the band during this period to be replaced by Peter Flierl's multi-instrumentalist brother, Vic Flierl on keyboards at many 'live' performances by the band. Although the band continued to receive praise for their exciting stage performances, the band seemed to have "more factions than a Labor Party conference", largely due to musical differences, commitment and direction.

=== End ===
Only 13 months into its existence and with a recording contract virtually on its doorstep, the band split with Flierl, Stein and Burton departing to form another band, Plan B, while Mankyboddle, Clements, Berrington & Oldman continued without them. The band returned to public performances some 4 months later under the banner "Del Webb Explosion – Back without Geno", possibly meaning that the earlier Dexys' influence which was such a major part of Flierl's basis for forming the band, was no longer in existence. In fact, when questioned about Geno at a show at the Tivoli in 1983, Mankyboddle said "Geno was dead" Even though the final Line-Up didn't produce any records, it made some very popular live recordings in which the new material took center stage. According to Mankyboddle, new member Kim Webster (later New Romantics) on keyboards was an important facet of the new direction the band took. Del Webb Explosion Mark III was the attempt to forge, in this kind of band line-up, a more original band from what for a long time was essentially a cover band. The final break up in the end was due to a lack of commitment to go "professional", i.e. interstate, even though the actual band personalities and individual musicianship were much better matched. So, in the end it wasn't so much friction, as the lack of ambition of some of the new members. The reformed band permanently broke up in late 1983.

=== Beyond Del Webb ===
Flierl, Stein and Burton quickly re-grouped to form Plan B which re-commenced gigging virtually the same week as the 'new' Del Webb Explosion. Following the second and final implosion of Del Webb Explosion, Mankyboddle joined forces with Steve Z to form The Sweets of Sin, an experimental crossover pop-band with strong modern classical and jazz influences.

== Members ==
=== Original ===
- Peter Flierl
- Heinz Stein
- Gerry Barrett
- Raimondo Pasetto
- Glenn Errington
- Daniel Clements
- Rob Symons
- Frank Moller (later Frank Mankyboddle)

=== Additional/Short Term ===
- Andy Berrington
- John Oldman
- Russell Burton
- Vic Flierl
- Kim Webster
- John Hastings
- Chris Woods

=== Current ===
- Peter Flierl
- Patrick Stapleton
- Rob Williams
- Adrian Miller
- Cameron McCracken Smith
- Gavin Atkinson
- Phillip Allen
- Paul Matthews
- Brett Sody

== Discography ==
- One Way Love b/w Going Home - Single - Empty Dogma (1981)
- Gardening as Finer Art b/w Too Late the Hero - Single - Greasy Pop Records (1982)
