= No 5 dumb hopper barge =

Wrecked barge at Ardrossan, South Australia

History
- Name: No 5 dumb hopper barge
- Operator: Department of Marine and Harbours, Government of South Australia
- Builder: Poole and Steel
- Out of service: 1978
- Fate: Scuttled to form artificial reef

General characteristics
- Type: hopper barge
- Length: 140 ft 0 in (42.67 m)
- Beam: 30 ft 4 in (9.25 m)
- Draft: 13 ft 6 in (4.11 m)

No 5 dumb hopper barge, since being scuttled known as the No. 5 Barge, Zanoni Barge and Ardrossan Barge, was a hopper barge which was built in 1911 at Balmain in New South Wales by Poole & Steel for the then Marine Board of South Australia, an agency of the Government of South Australia. She was part of a fleet of vessels used to dredge the shipping approaches to Port Adelaide and other ports in South Australia. Her specific role was to hold spoil from the dredging process and convey it under tow to a dumping site. In 1978, she became redundant after the purchase of two self-propelled barges.

Following the prohibition of access to the waters within 550 metres (1,800 feet) of the historic wrecksite of Zanoni, the barge was scuttled during the week ending 13 April 1984 about 17.5 kilometres (10.9 miles) south east of Ardrossan in Gulf St Vincent in South Australia in order to create an artificial reef available for recreational fishing use. The scuttling site, an official ship graveyard, is located at 34°31′48.88″S 138°03′47.04″E.

== See also ==
- List of shipwrecks of Australia
- List of shipwrecks in 1984
- Ship graveyard
