= Greasy Pop Records =

- Founded: 1980
- Founder: Doug Thomas
- Status: Inactive
- Distributor: Festival
- Genre: indie rock, indie pop, post-punk, detroit, power-pop, hardcore punk
- Country of origin: Australia
- Location: Adelaide, South Australia
- Official website: greasypop.com

Greasy Pop Records was an Australian independent record label established by Doug Thomas (musician with The Dagoes and with The Spikes) in 1980 in Adelaide. Greasy Pop Records predominantly signed South Australian artists including Exploding White Mice, Where's the Pope?, Del Webb Explosion and The Mad Turks from Istanbul. As from 2006, the label was owned by Pete Hartman-Kearns and Monique Laver. According to I-94 Bar's Patrick Emery, Greasy Pop "was the focus of much of the city’s vibrant music scene, putting out great records ... Much of the Greasy Pop stable was based on the Detroit-via-Birdman thing – it's interesting that while Adelaide continues to share a cultural affinity closer to Melbourne than Sydney, its musical influences arguably owe more to the Sydney and the Birdman sound than the art-school aesthetic of Melbourne".

== History ==
Greasy Pop Records was an independent record label founded by Doug Thomas in 1980. From May 1978 Thomas was a guitarist for Adelaide-based indie rock group The Dagoes (as Frankie Thomas). In February 1980 Thomas financed The Dagoes extended play, The Dagoes Sell Soul which was "American-oriented rock'n'roll" and was the debut release by Greasy Pop. Late in 1982 The Dagoes disbanded and early in 1983 Thomas formed a "hard-edged, swampy acid-pop" band, The Spikes, which also released its material on Greasy Pop. In 1985, Greasy Pop issued a compilation album of tracks, An Oasis in a Desert of Noise, by its popular artists: Exploding White Mice, The Mad Turks from Istanbul, The Spikes, Primitive Painters, Dust Collection, Plague, Garden Path, Verge, Ded Nats, On Heat and Primevils. In 2006, Greasy Pop issued a DVD, An Oasis in a Desert of Celluloid, with 33 music videos. As from August 2006, the label was owned by Pete Hartman-Kearns and Monique Laver. According to I-94 Bar's Patrick Emery, Greasy Pop "was the focus of much of the city’s vibrant music scene, putting out great records ... Much of the Greasy Pop stable was based on the Detroit-via-Birdman thing – it's interesting that while Adelaide continues to share a cultural affinity closer to Melbourne than Sydney, its musical influences arguably owe more to the Sydney and the Birdman sound than the art-school aesthetic of Melbourne".

== Artists ==
- Aunty Raylene
- Batteries not Included
- Bloodloss
- The Dagoes
- Liz Dealey and the Twenty Second Sect
- Ded Nats
- Del Webb Explosion
- Devil's Cabaret
- The Dust Collection
- The Every Brothers
- Exploding White Mice
- Garden Path
- Greg Williams
- Handmedowns
- Iron Sheiks
- July 14th
- The Lizard Train
- The Mad Turks from Istanbul a.k.a. The Mad Turks
- Morning Glory
- The Philisteins
- Plague
- Play Loud
- Pumpernickel
- Primitive Painters
- Screaming Believers
- The Spikes
- Undecided
- Where's the Pope?
- Neptune Lollyshoppe
