= Charles Jenkins (Australian musician) =

Australian musician (born 1966)

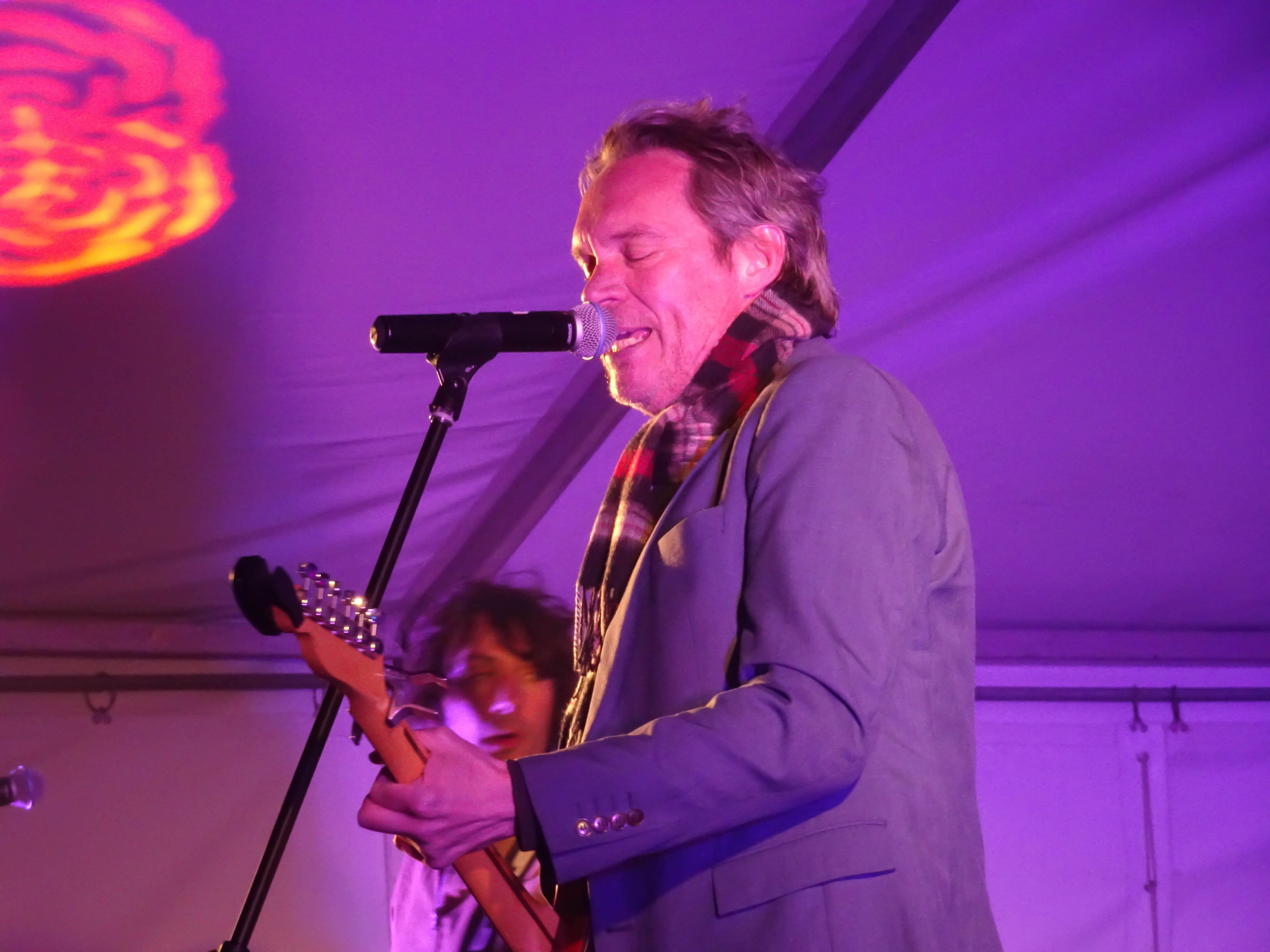
- Jenkins performing in Semaphore, South Australia, 2017

Background information
- Born: 1966 (age 59–60); Mildura, Victoria, Australia
- Instruments: Vocals, guitar
- Labels: Parole Records, Dust Devil Music, Rubber Records, Silver Stamp Records

Charles Jenkins (born 1966) is an Australian musician based in Melbourne, Victoria. He is a member of Icecream Hands, has released eight solo albums and is a member of Charles Jenkins and the Zhivagos.

== Early life ==
Following his birth in Mildura, Victoria, Jenkins moved to Adelaide, South Australia.

== Career ==
Jenkins started as a solo performer and later joined the band The Mad Turks From Istanbul. In 1989, Jenkins relocated to Melbourne, Victoria, Australia with the band, but the Mad Turks disbanded soon after the move and Jenkins formed a new band called 'Icecream Hands'. The band formed in 1992 and was originally named 'Chuck Skatt and His Icecream Hands'. Jenkins revealed in 2007 that the first of the five albums that Icecream Hands recorded, Travelling... Made Easy , sold poorly and he attributed this to "too many chords and too many words".

Icecream Hands functioned as a band for 16 years and Jenkins has stated that becoming a father significantly affected the manner in which he wrote songs for the quartet, as he was forced to exercise a greater degree of self-restraint: "I'm very fond of that album (Memory Lane Traffic Jam) because of the heartache that went into it. It was a real struggle."

The band's third album Sweeter than the Radio was released in 1999 and the independent label they were signed to had secured an arrangement with major label Bertelsmann Music Group, otherwise known as BMG. Up until that point, the band had never received the backing of a corporate music company and subsequently released five songs from their BMG-backed work, followed by constant touring. Jenkins explained afterwards: "I never saw (the lack of chart success) as a missed opportunity. I thought we were lucky just to have a major label."

By the time the third album Sweeter Than The Radio was released, again through independent Melbourne, Australian label Rubber Records, but BMG was no longer involved and Jenkins spoke of "one girl in Melbourne" handling duties by that stage. Prior to the band's fifth album, a 'best of' compilation, titled The Best of the Ice Cream Hands - You Can Ride My Bike was released by Rubber Records on the first day of 2004. Containing 43 songs, the live performance that coincided with the release of the compilation was described by an Australian music journalist as "strong, poetic songs filled the show with moments of sweet sonic purity. Melbourne is lucky to have them [Icecream Hands]."

During periods of inactivity by the members of Icecream Hands, Jenkins recorded three solo albums, including Bungalow from 2004. As a solo artist, Jenkins released a total of four studio albums between 2004 and 2010, and 2010's Blue Atlas, released on Dust Devil Music, introduced the public to a new band called the Zhivagos. Writing for website Mess + Noise, JP Hammond concluded that "There's no better soundtrack of hope [Blue Atlas] to close 2008."

Charles Jenkins and the Zhivagos have released three studio albums as of January 2014: Walk This Ocean (2010), Love Your Crooked Neighbour with Your Crooked Heart (2012) and Blue Atlas (2010). Released on Silver Stamp Records, Love Your Crooked Neighbour with Your Crooked Heart received a 4-star rating from music journalist Iain Shedden, who, writing for The Age newspaper, stated:

There's a smattering of gospel-tinged singalong, exquisitely crafted balladry and melodic invention in the mix as well, all matched by a sharp tongue and an ear for a killer hook.

Jenkins received a grant from the Australia Council in 2013 to record an album centred upon the theme of water. Along with band members Dave Mine, Davey Lane, Art Starr and Matty Vehl, Jenkins created Too Much Water in the Boat that consists of songs such as "Sweet Mildura", "Seven Creeks (the cross dresser Steve Hart)" and "The Barrel Song". On 3 January 2014, Jenkins's band previewed the album on "The Inner Sleeve", Paul Gough's program on the ABC's Radio National network. Gough described Jenkins's work as "wry, insightful pop songs that have more to say than most". Too Much Water in the Boat was produced and engineered by Justin Rudge, and features backing harmonies from ex-Icecream Hands member Douglas Lee Robertson, described by Jenkins as "extraordinary".

== Discography ==
=== Albums ===
List of albums, with selected details
Title	Details
Bungalow	Released: 2004; Format: CD; Label: Parole Records (PAR-001)
The City Gates	Released: 2005; Format: CD; Label: Parole Records (PAR-002)
Blue Atlas (as Charles Jenkins & The Zhivagos)	Released: 2008; Format: CD, Digital; Label: Devil Dust Records (DDCD0308)
Walk This Ocean (as Charles Jenkins & The Zhivagos)	Released: 2010; Format: CD, LP, Digital; Label: Devil Dust Records (DDCD0310)
Love Your Crooked Neighbor With Your Crooked Heart (as Charles Jenkins & The Zhivagos)	Released: September 2012; Format: CD, Digital; Label: Silver Stamp Records (SSR 001)
Too Much Water in the Boat (as Charles Jenkins & The Zhivagos)	Released: February 2014; Format: CD, LP, Digital; Label: Silver Stamp Records (SSR 002)
The Last Polaroid (as Charles Jenkins & The Zhivagos)	Released: 2017; Format: CD, LP, Digital; Label: Silver Stamp Records (SSR 004)
When I Was On the Moon	Released: March 2019; Format: CD, LP, Digital; Label: Silver Stamp Records (SSR 005)
When I Was In My Room	Released: April 2020; Format: Digital; Label: Charles Jenkins
Radio Sketches	Released: February 2022; Format: CD, LP, Digital; Label: Silver Stamp Records (SSR 007)

== Awards and nominations ==
=== EG Awards / Music Victoria Awards ===
The EG Awards (known as Music Victoria Awards since 2013) are an annual awards night celebrating Victorian music. They commenced in 2006.

Year	Nominee / work	Award	Result
2012	"Pray My Dear Daughter"	Best Song	Nominated
2012	Charles Jenkins	Best Male	Nominated
2014	Too Much Water in the Boat	Best Folk Roots Album	Won
