= July 14th (band) =

Australian folk rock music band

- Also known as: The Every Brothers, the Everys
- Origin: Adelaide, Australia
- Genres: Folk; rock; pop
- Years active: 1984–1999
- Label: Greasy Pop

July 14th were an Australian folk and rock band formed in 1984 in Adelaide by Terry Bradford on guitar and vocals, Robyn Habel on lead vocals and bass guitar, and Rod Ling on guitar and vocals. They issued three albums, Australian Bite (1985), Cut It Live (1986) and Till We Meet Again (1988). Bradford, as Terry Every, formed a folk and pop side project, the Every Brothers, in 1986 with Greg Williams (as Greg Every) on acoustic guitar and vocals. In 1987, July 14th disbanded, and Habel, on double bass and vocals, joined the Every Brothers. That group released three albums, Picks and Pens (1986), Everyone (1989) and Junk Factory (1998) before disbanding in 1999. Habel had undertaken a solo career from 1993. Bradford became a record label manager.

== 1984–1988: Early years ==
July 14th were formed in April 1984 in Adelaide as a folk and rock band by Terry Bradford on guitar and vocals (ex-Instamatix), Roy Ezinger on drums (ex-U-Bombs, Mutes), Robyn Habel on bass guitar and lead vocals, and Rod Ling on guitar and vocals (both ex-Empty Vessels). Bradford, Habel and Ling each celebrate birthdays on 14 July. Their debut single, "Me and My Gun", was issued in September 1984 via Greasy Pop, which was written by Bradford. Soon after, Tom Cowsill (ex-Odyssey, Montage) replaced Ezinger on drums.

The group released their debut album, Australian Bite, on 14 July 1985, which was produced by Jim Barbour. David Day, in SA Great It's Our Music 1956-1986 (1987), observed, "[it's] an exciting performance record... [which] highlighted the virtuoso talent of guitarist [Ling] in the rich, crafted songs from the pen of [Bradford]". The Canberra Times' Andrew Ferrington felt the band attempted "to prick a political consciousness and, although the lyrics don't quite hit the mark, the music is fascinating – a cross between whatever new wave is and post holocaust sparse, spare, thin, instrument work. It definitely grows with each listening."

July 14th provided the soundtracks for two documentaries, ABC-TV's Searching for Women in History and the American The Zanoni Project (1986), on the Zanoni (1865) shipwreck. Andrew Mills (ex-Desperate Measures, Speedboat) replaced Cowsill on drums in early 1986 and the band released a cassette album, Cut It Live, later that year. It had been recorded at various venues from April to September.

Bradford, p.k.a. Terry Every, began an acoustic folk pop duo, the Every Brothers, as side project with Greg Williams p.k.a. Greg Every on acoustic guitar and vocals. Williams was a member of Play Loud. The duo's debut extended play, Picks and Pens, was issued on Greasy Pop in August 1986. July 14th recorded their second studio album, Till We Meet Again, in 1987 but disbanded later that year with the album appearing posthumously in 1988.

== 1988–1999: Later years ==
Habel on double bass and vocals and Mills on drums joined the Every Brothers in 1988. They signed with Polydor, which issued three singles, "This Town" (January 1988), "Paved with Gold" (July) and "Eyes for the Blind" (December). They shortened their name to the Everys and released a studio album, Everyone, in February 1989. Victor Harbor Times' writer noticed, the "band plays music with clean, uncluttered harmonies that do not overpower the songs... the diversity of styles they incorporate in their songs, has meant they can't be easily categorised". The group were inactive from 1990. Outside performing Bradford established a record label, Round.

Robyn Habel undertook a solo career. She released her self-titled album by March 1993 via Rounder. Mike Gribble felt, "[her] enchanting vocal prowess... [on the album is] subtle yet its impact lies deep in clever lyrics and sophisticated and fresh arrangements." At the 1993 South Australian Music Industry awards Habel won categories for most outstanding songwriter, female vocalist, performer and release. Habel's second solo album, Red, was issued in August 1995. Australian musicologist Ian McFarlane observed, "[it] encompassed folk, blues and funk, all of which provided a good showcase for Habel's clear vocal style." To tour in support of her album, Habel formed the Rain as her backing band with James Aujard on guitar, Tim O'Donnell on keyboards, Trent Edwards on bass guitar and Nick Southgate on drums.

In 1996 Round issued July 14th's self-titled album. Bradford and Williams reformed the Every Brothers in 1997 and released another album, Junk Factory (February 1998) via Round, which McFarlane described as "swinging pop songs".

== 2000–present ==
Habel continued her solo performance career and also lectured in jazz at Adelaide University's Elder Conservatorium of Music into the 2000s. She released another solo album, Sun Come Shine, in 2008, which was produced by Michael Carpenter for Albert Music. Steve Jones of dBMagazine.com.au caught her performance in March 2009 at the Spiegeltent, she was able to "excel beyond her usual high standard [as] the acoustics here are superb, and every breath and nuance of Habel's remarkably wide vocal range, not forgetting her band the Rain's fantastic backing, came through crystal clear as they, and we the audience enjoyed a brilliant mix" by the live sound engineer. Bradford continued to manage Round into the 2000s. He was a member of another band, the Holiday, and also ran a weekly radio show, Hillbilly Hoot.

== Discography ==
=== Studio albums ===
- Australian Bite (14 July 1985) – Greasy Pop (GPR 114)
- Till We Meet Again (1988) – Greasy Pop (GPR 134)
- Everyone (by the Everys) (February 1989) – Polydor (837 321-1, 837 321-4, 837 321-2)
- July 14th (1996) – Round (CDRR023)
- Junk Factory (February 1998) – Round (CDRR032)

=== Live albums ===
- Cut It Live (late 1986) – Greasy Pop (GPR TAPE 3)

=== Extended plays ===
- Picks and Pens (by the Every Brothers) (August 1986) – Greasy Pop (GPR 123)
