= The Mad Turks from Istanbul =

Australian power pop band

- Also known as: The Mad Turks
- Origin: Adelaide, South Australia, Australia
- Genre: Power pop
- Years active: 1984–1991
- Labels: Greasy Pop, Festival
- Spinoffs: Icecream Hands
- Past members: Charles Jenkins; Dominic Larizza; Martyn Christopher; Matthias Eckhardt; Steve Caon; Phil Magnay

The Mad Turks from Istanbul were an Australian power pop band from Adelaide. They formed in 1984 with mainstays Chuck Skatt (aka Charles Jenkins) on lead vocals (later also on rhythm guitar), and Dom Benedictine III (Dominic Larizza) on drums (later on guitar). In 1987 they issued their debut album, Cafe Istanbul, on Greasy Pop Records. In 1989 the band relocated to Melbourne as The Mad Turks to release their second album, Toast in 1990. The group disbanded in late 1991 with both Skatt and Benedictine forming Icecream Hands.

== History ==
The Mad Turks from Istanbul formed in 1984 in Adelaide with Chuck Skatt (Charles Jenkins) on vocals, Dom Benedictine III (Dominic Larizza) on drums, Martyn La Merde (Martyn Christopher) on bass guitar and Hank M Turk (Matthias Eckhardt) on guitar. According to Skatt, "Chuck Skatt was a name I'd been using in high school to offend people and it suited the silly arse punk bands we were in". The Mad Turks had formed from local acts Crunch Pets, Rigormortis, Faith by Force and the Dysentry Bags and were signed by Greasy Pop Records. In 1985 they provided a track, "Yet You Wonder Why", for their label's compilation album, An Oasis in a Desert of Noise. They performed on a bill alongside punk rockers The Celibate Rifles and fellow Adelaide band The Sweets of Sin. In 1986 Steve Caon joined on drums and Benedictine moved over to guitar and in October they released their debut single, "Lolene". In November 1987 they issued their debut album, Cafe Istanbul and second single, "Holding My Breath". A third single, "Looking Forward to Destroy" followed in May 1988.

In 1989 Turk left the band and Skatt started playing rhythm guitar, the group relocated to Melbourne and became The Mad Turks. Jenkins described the basis for the change, "The problem was ... you could live off the dole as a musician really easily in Adelaide, so there was plenty of money for recreational vices. A little bit too easy. When I got to Melbourne, it was time to get it together". There they released their second album, Toast (1990, Greasy Pop). In early 1990, La Merde was replaced on bass guitar by Phil Magnay from Perth band The Jackals. Toast spawned three singles, "Tempers Flare" (May 1989), "The Last Time" (November) and "Walking Disaster" (March 1990). In late 1991 management problems, poor promotion by Festival and low attendances at gigs resulted in the group disbanding. In 1992 Skatt and Benedictine (now as Larizza) went on to form Icecream Hands (initially as Chuck Skatt and His Icecream Hands).

== Discography ==
=== Studio albums ===
List of albums, with selected details and chart positions
Title	Album details	Peak chart positions
Title	Album details	AUS
Cafe Istanbul	Released: November 1987; Format: LP, CD, cassette; Label: The Greasy Record Company / Festival Records (L 38830)	72
Toast (As Mad Turks)	Released: March 1990; Format: LP, CD, cassette; Label: The Greasy Record Company / Festival (L 30162)	55

=== Singles ===
List of singles, with selected chart positions
Year	Title	Peak chart positions	Album
Year	Title	AUS	Album
1986	"Lolene"/"Seeing Was Believing"	—	Cafe Istanbul
1987	"Holding My Breath"/"All Those Words"/"Prostitute My Brain"	85	Cafe Istanbul
1988	"Looking Forward to Destroy"/"Given My Number"	—	Cafe Istanbul
1989	"Tempers Fire"/"American Hearthrob"	127	Toast
1989	"The Last Time"/"Elusive Dream"	—	Toast
1990	"Walking Disaster"/"Holding My Breath"	—	Toast
