= The Sweets of Sin =

Australian pop band

- Also known as: Ship of Fools
- Origin: Adelaide, South Australia, Australia
- Genres: Crossover, pop, classical, jazz
- Years active: 1985–1994, 2002–present
- Labels: Jarra Hill, Larrikin, Kip
- Members: Frank Mankyboddle; Engel Musehold; Andreas Peters
- Past members: Steve Z Daniel O'Shea Clements; Dirk Lang; Helge Krause; Mirko Breder; Thomas Pertzel
- Website: www.the-sweets-of-sin.com

The Sweets of Sin are an Australian experimental crossover pop band with strong modern classical, jazz and performance influences. The group formed in Adelaide in 1985 by Frank Mankyboddle (aka Frank Möller) on vocals, guitar and percussion; and Steve Z (Stephen Lock) on soprano and tenor saxophones, French horn, flute, clarinet, keyboards, vocals and keyboard programming. The band's name was from Ulysses by James Joyce on the instigation of Steve Z. They relocated to Sydney in 1986 and issued a self-titled debut album in 1987 on Jarra Hill Records. The group moved to Berlin in 1989 and disbanded there in 1994. Mankyboddle reformed the group in 2002 and they issued Me-ism in 2004.

== History ==
=== Adelaide: 1985–86 ===
In 1985 The Sweets of Sin were formed in Adelaide by Frank Mankyboddle (vocals, percussion, guitar, songwriting) who had been the lead-singer of an 8-piece new soul band, Del Webb Explosion (1980–83), and Steve Z (French horn, saxophones, keyboard, composition) previously playing with Empty Vessels.

In 1984 Mankyboddle, known as Frank Möller, had formed Ship of Fools immediately after leaving Del Web Explosion. He was joined by Z (aka Stephen Lock) who provided the band's name, The Sweets of Sin, from the novel, Ulysses, by James Joyce. Both Mankyboddle and Z wanted to change their musical styles, they were influenced by modern classical (but also baroque) composers: Stravinsky, Ravel, Messiaen, Debussy, Reich, Arvo Pärt and Cage; to pop artists: Japan, Talking Heads, Kate Bush, Laurie Anderson, Dead Can Dance, Hector Zazou and King Crimson. Their sound formed around modal harmonies and intensive rhythmic patterns. They started performing as a two-piece with theatrical antics, at concert nights sometimes wedged between punk rockers, The Celibate Rifles, and power pop group, The Mad Turks from Istanbul, irritating conservative reviewers. By 1986 the duo realised that Adelaide did not support their style and moved to Sydney adding Daniel O'Shea Clements – previously the trumpeter in Del Webb Explosion – on drums, percussion and vocals.

=== Sydney: 1986–89 ===
The Sweets of Sin's move to Sydney resulted in their being seen by Larrikin Records' Bill O'Toole at a Balmain world music venue. Their debut self-titled album was issued in 1989 by Jarra Hill Records under the Larrikin Records label. Australian Rolling Stone's Mark Demetrious found The Sweets of Sin "boast a rich potpourri of instruments and influences, the latter including Middle Eastern, Chinese, cabaret and German electronic. But where the likes of Kraftwerk and Can were often sterile and mechanistic, this album is bursting with life and is as beautifully evocative as it is musically literate". Even though uneasy with the "world music" description, they were open to its influences, which are seen in "Can Hatice" (their rendition of a Kurdish song performed by Ibrahim Tatlises) and "The Gang of Four on Holiday in Sudan". They issued "Experiment with Me" as the debut single in 1987, it had been written by Stephen Lock. Critics praised the band, however this did not translate into making a living. Their residency at the Sandringham Hotel (which they held, irregularly, for a couple of years) did not develop their artistic ambitions so they decided they would interest a larger and more experimental-minded European audience.

=== Berlin: 1989–94 ===
The Sweets of Sin relocated to Berlin after living in the West German countryside for six months in early 1990. Their early time in Europe were characterised by a sharing attitude, with members varying in their joy at having communal access to money, cigarettes and living space for three was on the bedroom floor of a family's flat in the industrial, provincial Ruhr region.

The Sweets of Sin developed musically by venturing into jazz, playing standards and some originals by Steve Z, under the name Kool Skool. They added a fourth member – Dirk Lang on bass guitar – and then lived in the inner eastern Berlin suburb of Prenzlauer Berg, just as The Berlin Wall came down. There were concerts at Volksbühne, the Franz Club, and at Objekt 5 in Halle; tours to Poland, Prague, the Metz Festival in France and through Belgium; with positive reviews in Tagesspiegel and Tip. However, personal differences led to the group's break up in 1994.

=== 2002–present ===
In 2002, Mankyboddle reformed The Sweets of Sin with Lang, now on guitar. Initially they played acoustically with a new acoustic bass player, Helge Krause. In 2004 their second album, Me-ism, was released on KIP-records, which had re-released their first album as a CD in Europe. After the departure of Krause in 2004 and Lang in 2006, Mankyboddle restructured the band with Thomas Pertzel and Andreas Peters, playing electronics, drums and wind instruments.

== Members ==
=== Current ===
- Frank Mankyboddle (aka Frank Möller) – vocals, percussion, guitar, songwriting
- Andreas Peters – electronics, drums, wind instruments
- Helmut Engel–Musehold – saxophones, flutes, midicontrollers

=== Former ===
- Steve Z (aka Stephen Lock) – soprano & tenor saxophones, French horn, flute, clarinet, keyboards, vocals, keyboard programming
- Daniel O'Shea Clements – drums, percussion, vocals
- Dirk Lang – bass guitar, guitar
- Helge Krause – acoustic bass guitar
- Thomas Pertzel – saxophone, melodica, vocals
- Mirko Breder

== Discography ==
- The Sweets of Sin – Jarra Hill Records JH2011 (1987) LP, Kip-Records (1991) (KIP 8008) CD
- Me-ism (2004) Kip-Records (KIP 8009)
