= Hired Hand =

Hired hand may refer to

- Hired hand an employee
- Ranch hand or cowboy
- Hired Hand, an artist with Fake Four Inc. record label
- The Hired Hand, a Western film
