= Zanoni (1865) =

Protected shipwreck in South Australia

Coordinates: 34°30′43.8″S 138°03′48.4″E

History
- Name: Zanoni
- Owner: Thomas Royden & Son
- Builder: W. H. Potter & Co
- Launched: 1865
- Maiden voyage: 14 February 1866 Liverpool to Lima, Peru
- Fate: Sank in bad weather, 1867

General characteristics
- Type: Barque
- Tonnage: 330 tonnes / 338 tons
- Length: 139 feet (42 m)
- Propulsion: Sail
- Crew: Captain plus 13 crew

Zanoni was a ship built in Liverpool, England in 1865 by W. H. Potter & Co as a 338-ton composite barque. It was owned by Thomas Royden & Sons who intended to use it for the East India trade.

It sank in Gulf St Vincent in South Australia in 1867. The wreck is now the best-preserved merchant ship wreck remaining in South Australia from the 19th century.

== Voyages ==
Zanoni left Liverpool on 14 February 1866 for Lima, Peru. There she unloaded the cargo from England and loaded 400 tons of guano bound for Port Louis, Mauritius. At Port Louis, she loaded 4551 bags of sugar for Port Adelaide, South Australia. and arrived on 13 January 1867. She unloaded the sugar, then loaded 15 tons of bark and some wheat, and proceeded up the coast on 2 February to Port Wakefield to load more wheat, intending to return to Port Adelaide then return to England.

The ship encountered a violent squall on the way from Port Wakefield back to Port Adelaide carrying the bark and a total of 4025 bags of wheat and sank without trace. The 16 people on board (captain, 13 crew and two stevedores) were all rescued, but the hull was not located until 1983.

== The wreck ==
Despite several searches and a £100 reward in the weeks following the sinking, Zanoni was not found in 1867. A new attempt to find it in the early 1980s gained information from a retired fisherman and the wreck was found and identified, about 2 nautical miles (3.7 km; 2.3 mi) northeast of the position the survivors had reported, 15 kilometres (9.3 mi) southeast of Ardrossan, in 18 metres (59 ft) of water.

The site of the wreck of Zanoni is now protected by a 550 metres (1,800 ft) exclusion zone declared under the South Australian Historic Shipwrecks Act 1981 on 26 May 1983. No boating of any kind is permitted inside this zone, in an attempt to protect what remains of the ship from damage from fishing nets and boat anchors.

The No 5 dumb hopper barge (also known as the Zanoni Barge) was scuttled in 1984 1 nautical mile (1.9 km; 1.2 mi) south of Zanoni to provide an alternative artificial reef for fishing and diving. An American documentary, The Zanoni Project, on the shipwreck was broadcast in 1986. Adelaide-based band July 14th provided its soundtrack.

== See also ==
- List of shipwrecks of Australia
- List of shipwrecks in 1867
- Ship graveyard#Australia
