= The Lust-O-Rama =

Norwegian garage rock band

The Lust-O-Rama was a Norwegian garage rock band active 1989–1993, started by Geir “Bulle” Underdal of Matchstick Sun with vocalist Arne Thelin from The Cosmic Dropouts.

== Discography ==
- The In-Crowd E.P. A1: I Want You A2: Hey Hey Hey B1: Baby Baby B2: Don't Love Her 1990
- The Lust-O-Rama EP A1: Do Be Doo A2: Don't Love Her B1: Up And Down B2: Sweet As Sin
- Smells Like Teenage Psychosis EP A1: When I'm Gone A2: Midnight Train B1: Ooh Poo Pah Doo B2: Margio 1992
- Good Morning Little Schoolboy A1: Mr. Nobody A2: Can't Give You Anything B1: I'm Walkin' Babe B2: Get The Picture 1996
- Why? EP A1: Why? A2: Hold B1: Night Of The Phantom B2: Do You Like What You See? 1993
- Darkside E.P. A1: If You'll Be Mine A2: Be So Fine B1: I Don't Love Her B2: Werewolf
