= The Lizard Train =

Australian rock band

- Also known as: The Dumb Earth, The Hired Guns
- Origin: Adelaide, South Australia, Australia
- Genres: Rock
- Years active: 1985–2010
- Labels: Greasy Pop, Shagpile/Shock, Pop Gun, Rubber, Hour of Need/Sony, Laughing Outlaw
- Past members: Shane Bloffwitch; David Creese; Phil Drew; Chris Willard; Mark Ford; Adam Kyle Spellicy; Glendon Blazely; Kiernan Box; Phil Kakulas; Simon Whithear

The Lizard Train were an Australian rock band from Adelaide which formed in early 1985. They released five albums, Slippery (September 1987), The Ride (1990), Get Yer Wah Wahs Out (1992), Couch (1993) and Everything Moves (1995). Australian rock music historian, Ian McFarlane, contrasted their early work as "a melange of screaming guitars did battle over a rumbling rhythm section. Yet, beneath the distorted riffs and lyrical angst, the band boasted a melodic and harmonic sensibility usually disregarded in such aggressive music" with later work "brimming with powerful, dark songs and inspired musicianship".

Chris Willard and David Creese went on to form the Dumb Earth in 1993 then relocated the new band to Melbourne which issued an album, Walk the Earth in June 1997. Music journalist, Andy Turner, described their sound as a "brain-melting amalgamation of avant-garde jazz and slide guitar". In 1996 a side-project, The Hired Guns, was formed to play late 1960s and early 1970s psychedelic country rock. Founders of all three groups were David Creese on drums, chimes and vocals; and Chris Willard on lead vocals, lead guitar, and bass guitar. The Dumb Earth's second album, Blessings in Disguise, appeared in 2001. The Hired Guns debut album, Between Here & the Night, was issued the following year. In November 2002 Willard left The Dumb Earth, by mid-2005 the group had disbanded and Creese pursued a solo career. Willard continued with The Hired Guns until it disbanded in late 2010.

== History ==
=== Adelaide years (1985–1995) ===
The Lizard Train were formed in Adelaide in early 1985 with Shane Bloffwitch (ex-Risque Humour) on bass guitar and vocals; David Creese (Risque Humour) on drums, chimes and vocals; Phil Drew on guitar and vocals; and Chris Willard (Head On, Crawling Eye, Acid Drops, Revenge of the Gila Monsters) on lead guitar and lead vocals. Willard's former bandmate and then-girlfriend, Liz Dealey, formed her own band, Liz Dealey and the Twenty Second Sect. The Lizard Train's first gig was in May 1985 and their first recording was as backing musicians on Liz Dealey and the Twenty Second Sect's debut single, "The Wailing House", in 1986. In late 1989 Willard recalled the band's formation:

We've been around since early 85, and I was in a band before that called the Acid Drops with Liz Dealy [sic] and a couple of other people, and I split off in late 84, and I'm a friend of Phil, and we got together and started jamming with the idea of getting a band together. And I sort of knew Dave and Shane... they'd been in a band called Risque Humour, and we bumped into them through a mutual friend who became our sound engineer and they said let's have a jam, so we all got together and it all started from there, just jamming in Shane's lounge until we got a little more serious and hit the practice room.

— Chris Willard, Gardner, Steve (Fall 1989). "The Lizard Train", Noise for Heroes.

In August 1986 The Lizard Train released their debut extended play, Thirteen Hour Daydream, on Greasy Pop Records. Its four tracks had been recorded in December the previous year at Adelaide's Studio 202 with Kim Horne engineering and producing. Australian music historian, Ian McFarlane, described the EP, "a melange of screaming guitars did battle over a rumbling rhythm section. Yet, beneath the distorted riffs and lyrical angst, the band boasted a melodic and harmonic sensibility usually disregarded in such aggressive music".

From August to October 1987 The Lizard Train undertook their first tour of Europe where the EP had gained some popularity in France and Germany. In September that year they issued their debut studio album, Slippery, which McFarlane observed was "slightly less supercharged (though still effective)". Its lead single, "Beauty Underground" had appeared in June and was followed in October by "Ever Been There?". Drew left in December, according to Willard "we'd found that the three of us couldn't get on with Phil anymore so we asked him to leave", and the group continued as a trio. They toured Europe again and then in September 1989 they started recording their second album, The Ride, at Bartels St Studio with Tony Elliot producing. It appeared the following year with a single, "She Gets Me". McFarlane felt the album "stands as the high point in the band's career, a work brimming with powerful, dark songs and inspired musicianship".

In October–November 1991 they recorded their next album, Get Your Wah Wahs Out, with Elliot producing again. By 1992 they had signed with Shock Records' label, Shagpile Records and released the album that year. McFarlane felt the title was apt as it "featured an unsettling sonic assault of wah wah and fuzzed guitar effects that was remarkably intriguing by the same token". In October 1993 they followed with a six-track album, Couch, produced by Darren McBain, Dave Lokan and Lizard Train; and recorded at Big Sound Studios in April.

In March 1995 the next album, Everything Moves, appeared; it was preceded by its associated single, "It all Came from Nothing", a month earlier. They were produced by Steve Albini (Nirvana, The Breeders, The Jesus Lizard) at Mixmasters Studio in Belair. Both albums "maintained the noise factor as well as the song quality". In May that year they issued a five-track extended play, Inertia, also produced by Albini. By that time they had relocated to Melbourne and became The Dumb Earth. In a 1998 interview with Slide Show Fanzine Willard recalled The Lizard Train's music as "a sort of heavy pop / psychedelic band".

=== Melbourne years (1995-current): The Dumb Earth vs The Hired Guns ===
By May 1995 The Lizard Train's Creese and Willard, now on bass guitar and backing vocals, had relocated to Melbourne and formed The Dumb Earth with Mark Ford on saxophone and Adam Kyle Spellicy on guitar and vocals. According to music journalist, Andy Turner, their sound was "brain-melting amalgamation of avant-garde jazz and slide guitar". In December 1994 they had recorded their debut single, "Taxi Me Through" while still in Adelaide, at The Basement with Grant Sullivan producing – it was released the following year on Pop Gun Records. By June 1997 they had signed with Rubber Records and issued their debut album, Walk the Earth, which was produced by Martyn Robinson at Domestic Bliss Studios. The majority of tracks were written by Creese alone with three co-written by Creese and Willard. Willard described their "playing sort of dark jazz /blues filmic music".

By 2001 Ford had been replaced on saxophone by Simon Whithear who also provided clarinet and backing vocals; the line-up was expanded by the addition of Glendon Blazely on trombone, trumpet, tuba and backing vocals; Kiernan Box on piano and piano accordion; and Phil Kakulas on double bass. The Dumb Earth's second album, Blessings in Disguise, was released in September that year with David Nelson producing at the Yarn Factory for the Hour of Need label and was distributed by Sony Music. By November 2002 had Willard left the group and was replaced by Justin Avery on bass guitar. By mid-2005 The Dumb Earth had disbanded and Creese pursued a solo career.

Back in 1996 Creese, Spellicy and Willard, now on lead guitar and lead vocals, had formed a side-project, The Hired Guns, with Anthony Paine (also in Snout) on bass guitar and backing vocals. This group played late 1960s and early 1970s psychedelic country rock. In 1998 they released a split/single "Blue Sunday" backed by a track by The Dearhunters. In 2002 they issued their debut album, Between Here & the Night, on Laughing Outlaw Records. By 2005 Creeese had left The Hired Guns but Willard continued with the group until it disbanded in late 2010.

== Discography ==
=== Studio albums ===
The Lizard Train

- Slippery – Greasy Pop Records GPR 132 (September 1987)
- The Ride – Greasy Pop Records GPR 156 (1990)
- Get Your Wah Wahs Out – Shagpile Records/Shock Records SHAG CD 0010 (1992)
- Couch – Shagpile Records/Shock Records Shag CD2014 (October 1993)
- Everything Moves – Shagpile Records/Shock Records SHAGCD2022 (March 1995)

The Dumb Earth

- Walk the Earth – Rubber Records RUB 069CD (June 1997)
- Blessings in Disguise – Hour of Need HON001 (September 2001)
- Dry Land – UXB Recordings uxb811 (2005)

The Hired Guns

- Between Here & the Night – Laughing Outlaw Records LORCD-048 (2002)
- You Know Something – (10 September 2010)
- Golden Home – (2014)

=== Compilation albums ===
The Dumb Earth

- Old Days Rarities (1993–2004) – Hour of Need HON002 (2004)

=== Extended plays ===
The Lizard Train

- Thirteen Hour Daydream – Greasy Pop Records GPR 117 (August 1986)
- Inertia – Shagpile Records/Shock Records SHAGCD7015 (May 1995)

The Dumb Earth

- Auld Lanxiety Attack Rubber Records/BMG (February 1999)

The Hired Guns

- Flyin' One Sided Records ONE001 (2009)

=== Singles ===
The Lizard Train

- "Beauty Underground" (1987)
- "Ever Been There?" (1987)
- "Motorcycle of Love" (1988)
- "She Gets Me" (1990)
- "It all Came from Nothing" (1995)

The Dumb Earth

- "Taxi Me Through" (1995)
- "Tailem Bend" (1998)
