= Sweet as Sin =

2016 nonfiction book by Susan Benjamin

First edition (publ. Prometheus Books)

Sweet as Sin: The Unwrapped Story of How Candy Became America’s Pleasure is a 2016 nonfiction book written by Susan Benjamin. It focuses on the history of candy and its importance in American culture. The book details the history of the birth of sweets from the harvesting of the marshmallow plant in ancient Egypt to the mass-produced candy innovations of the twentieth century. The book also covers the history of chocolate, botanical sweets, and candied nuts. Benjamin describes these candy stories as rich and deep, from a national, political, and human rights level.

== Reviews ==
The Washington Independent wrote: "She is obviously passionate about her mission to place candy in an historical and cultural context."

Portland Book Review wrote: "The book is full of research and black and white photos, but lacks much in true substance."
