= Screaming Believers =

Australian 1980s rock music band

- Origin: Adelaide, South Australia, Australia
- Genres: Rock
- Years active: 1981–1991
- Labels: Empty Dogma/EMI, Greasy Pop
- Past members: Graeme Burdett; Paul Hughes; Rees Hughes; Craig Rodda; Ken Sykes; John Cavuoto; Cloudi Katern; Chris Lambden; Jodie Peterson; Dave Goulden

Screaming Believers were an Australian rock group formed in Adelaide in 1981. Mainstay members were Paul Hughes on vocals and saxophone, Craig Rodda on drums and Ken Sykes on guitar and vocals. They released two studio albums, Communist Mutants from Space (1985) and Refugees from the Love Generation (1988), before disbanding in 1991. A compilation album, Stories from the Other Side (2010), was issued.

== History ==
Adelaide rock group, Screaming Believers, were formed in mid-1981 by Graeme Burdett on guitar, Paul Hughes on vocals and saxophone, Rees Hughes on bass guitar, Craig Rodda on drums and Ken Sykes on guitar and vocals. Burdett, Paul Hughes, Rodda and Sykes had all been members of the Shreds with Richard Opolski on bass guitar. That group had formed in early 1980 and when Rees Hughes replaced Opolski on bass guitar in the following year they were renamed. Rees Hughes and Rodda had also been bandmates in guitar pop band, Fools Apart in early 1981.

They recorded four live tracks in September 1981 at the Union Hotel, Adelaide, which were issued in 1981 as their debut extended play, Show Me Your Money, via Empty Dogma/EMI. They supported shows by visiting artists, the Human League, Psychedelic Furs and John Cooper Clarke. The Australian group's debut single, "My Eyes" (February 1984) was released via Greasy Pop. Woroni's reviewer felt, "It's refreshing, clever, slightly ska-ish, and sufficiently assertive to be a bloody good rock number." Screaming Believers provided two tracks, "I Want to Have You" and "Unprofessional" to Greasy Pop's sampler album, Greasy Selection (March 1985).

The rock group began recording their debut album, Communist Mutants from Space (June 1985), late in the previous year with Bob Allen as producer-engineer. Andrew W Ferrington of The Canberra Times notices "[it] is plainly surprising... most of the music is guitar based, sounds range from the whole spectrum of rock and roll - from beat to psychedelic, from 1950s sounding guitar music to modern... a lot of subtle sounds that only come out after a close listening." Burdett had been replaced on guitar by John Cavuoto (ex-the Innocents) before it appeared. Cloudi Katern took over bass guitar from Rees Hughes later that year.

Chris Lambden replaced Katern on bass guitar after the second studio album, Refugees from the Love Generation (March 1988) had been recorded. Lambden was replaced in turn by Jodie Petersen. Screaming Believers had recorded an unreleased album and disbanded in 1991. Australian musicologist Ian McFarlane determined, that their recordings "were brimming with refined songs and highly proficient, melodic guitar thrash. That they failed to attract a wider audience is a great shame." A compilation album, Stories from the Other Side, was issued in 2010 via Early Bird Records. According to its liner notes it had been recorded during a weekend in 1987 with the line-up of Burdett, Paul Hughes, Rees Hughes, Rodda and Sykes.

== Members ==
- Graeme Burdett – guitar (1981-1985)
- Paul Hughes – vocals, saxophone (1981-1991)
- Rees Hughes – bass guitar (1981-1985)
- Craig Rodda – drums, percussion (1981-1991)
- Ken Sykes – guitar, vocals (1981-1991)
- John Cavuoto – guitar (1985-1991)
- Cloudi Katern – bass guitar (1985-1988)
- Chris Lambden – bass guitar (1988)
- Jodie Peterson – bass guitar (1988-1991)
- Dave Goulden - manager, percussion (1981-1985)

== Discography ==
=== Studio albums ===
- Communist Mutants from Space (June 1985) – Greasy Pop (GPR 111)
- Refugees from the Love Generation (March 1988) – Greasy Pop (GPR 135)

=== Compilation albums ===
- Stories from the Other Side (2010)

=== Extended plays ===
- Show Me Your Money (1981) – Empty Dogma/EMI (DOG-001)

=== Singles ===
- "My Eyes" (1984)
- "Sandra" (1987)
