= Eldia =

Coordinates: 41.78274°N 69.93433°W

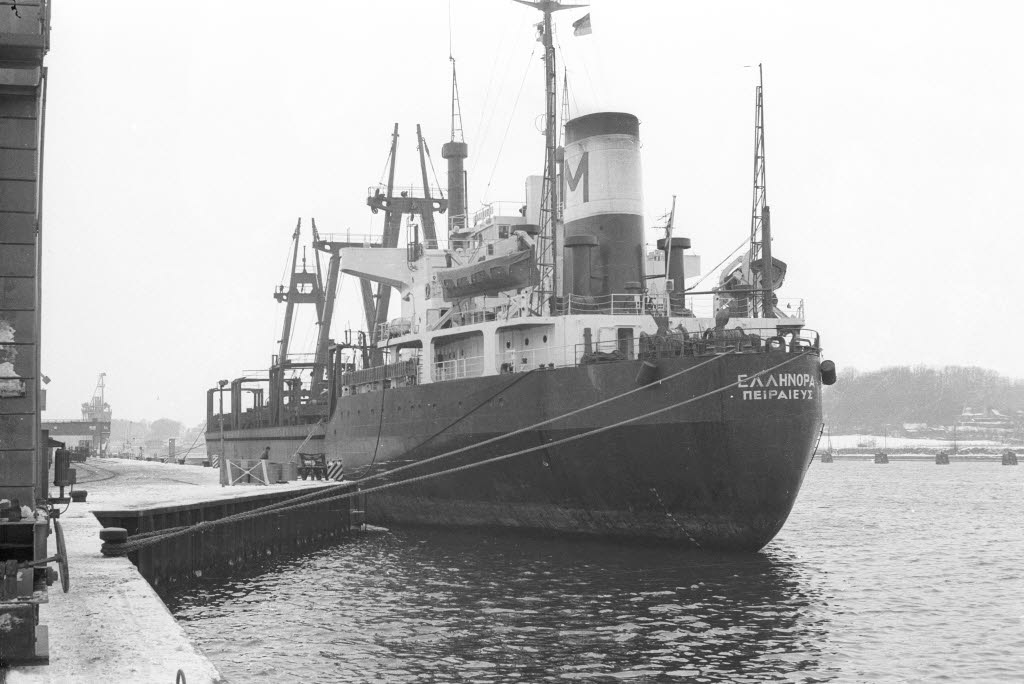
- The ship as Ellinora in 1976

History
- Name: Eldia
- Owner: Thenamaris
- Builder: Sanoyas Hishino Meisho; Osaka, Japan
- Completed: 1966
- Out of service: Grounded, March 29, 1984
- Identification: Call sign: 9QHI; IMO number: 6608660
- Fate: Scrapped

General characteristics
- Type: Freighter
- Tonnage: 9,807 GT; 15,568 DWT
- Length: 473 ft (144 m)
- Propulsion: Oil / Screw
- Crew: 23

Eldia was a steel freighter which was blown ashore in East Orleans, Massachusetts on March 29, 1984. The ship, which was owned by the Greek company Thenamaris Inc. and registered in Malta, was refloated two months later by the salvage company Donjon Marine who received title to the ship as payment. A year later the ship was scrapped.

== Circumstances of wreck ==
After delivery of its load of Colombian sugar in Saint John, New Brunswick Eldia was hit by a storm delivering 80-mile-per-hour (129 km/h; 70 kn) winds. This storm was part of a period of extreme weather which caused President Ronald Reagan to pledge federal disaster relief. Running for the open sea without cargo or ballast, and therefore riding high on the waves, Eldia was unable to match the strength of the storms. Her captain, Ernesto Garces, was also hampered by her lack of contemporary electronic technology for monitoring the weather, which had enabled other ships in the area to anticipate the problems that would come with the storm and take appropriate action; all he could do was monitor radio broadcasts. He attempted to bring the ship under control but was forced onto Nauset Beach at around 4pm. Two hours later the ship was abandoned by its crew of 23 Filipinos, who were rescued by a helicopter from Air Station Cape Cod.

Due to the ease of access to the area New England residents crowded to see the sight when the weather improved. One estimation is that approximately 150,000 did so. The town collected US$81,693 by charging $2 a day for visitors' car parking, and many businesses conducted a lot of additional trade during this curious period.

The wreck was drawn back off the beach on May 17, 1984, taken to a scrapyard in Rhode Island and then on to another at Staten Island. The ship was reportedly cut up in either 1985 or 1989.

== Archive material ==
The Orleans public library maintains a collection of memorabilia related to Eldia including photos, accounts and official records. A local coffeehouse and market in East Orleans was named after the famous ship but was closed in 2006. The original owners of the shop donated their collection of Eldia images, original paintings, newspaper articles and personal accounts to the Orleans Historic Society.

== Former names ==
- Wakabasan Maru - 1966 to 1973
- Ellinora - 1973 to January 24, 1981
- John - 1981 to November 21, 1982
