= Badlands (disambiguation) =

Badlands are a type of terrain with clay-rich soil, and are found in regions with arid climate.

Badlands, Bad lands or Badland may also refer to:

== Places ==
=== Canada ===
- Municipal District of Badlands No. 7, Alberta, a former municipal district

=== United States ===
- Philadelphia Badlands, a section of North Philadelphia, Pennsylvania
- Badlands National Park, South Dakota
  - Badlands Observatory, an astronomical observatory named after the South Dakota Badlands
  - Badlands Wilderness, a wilderness area located entirely within the national park
- The Badlands (California), a mountain range

== Arts and entertainment ==
=== Films ===
- In the Badlands, 1909 film with Hobart Bosworth, Betty Hartem and Tom Santschi
- The Bad Lands, a 1925 film starring Harry Carey
- Bad Lands (1939 film), an American western film starring Robert Barrat
- Badlands (film), a 1973 Terrence Malick film
- Into the Badlands (film), 1991 Western horror film
- Badland (2007 film), a German-American drama film directed by Francesco Lucente
- Bad Land: The Road to Fury, UK released title of the 2014 film Young Ones
- Badland (2019 film), an American western film starring Kevin Makely
- Bad Lands (2023 film), a Japanese drama film directed by Masato Harada
- Predator: Badlands, a 2025 film set in the Predator universe

=== Music ===
==== Bands ====
- Badlands (band), an American hard rock band formed by Jake E. Lee
- Badlands, a British band formed by John Sloman

==== Albums ====
- Badlands (Badlands album), a 1989 album by the band of the same name
- Badlands (Dirty Beaches album), a 2011 album by Dirty Beaches
- Badlands (Peter Erskine), a 2001 album
- Badlands (Halsey album), a 2015 album by Halsey
- Badlands, a 1978 album and song by Bill Chinnock
- Badlands, a 2013 album and song by Trampled Under Foot

==== EPs ====
- Badlands (EP), a 2013 EP by Australian group Bad Dreems

==== Songs ====
- "Badlands" (song), by Bruce Springsteen, 1978
- "Badlands", a song by AC/DC from Flick of the Switch
- "Badlands", a song by Metal Church from Blessing in Disguise
- "Bad Lands", a song by Zion I & The Grouch from Heroes in the City of Dope
- "Badlands", a song by Mumford & Sons (with Gracie Abrams) from Prizefighter
- "Badlands", a song by Kevin Morby from Little Wide Open

==== Other ====
- Badlands (Swedish musical act), a Swedish semi-electronic music project formed by producer Catharina Jaunviksna

=== Publications ===
- Bad Land: An American Romance, a 1996 travelogue by Jonathan Raban
- Badlands, a comic book mini-series by Steven Grant
- Badlands, a 1975 novel by Robert Kroetsch about the Red Deer Valley of southern Alberta
- Badlands, a 2025 novel by Douglas Preston and Lincoln Child

=== Television ===
- "Badlands" (Backup), a 1995 episode
- "Badlands", an episode of Generator Rex
- "Badlands", an episode of Jewel Riders
- Into the Badlands (TV series)

=== Video games ===
- Badland (video game), released in 2013
  - Badland 2, a sequel of the mobile game
- Badlands (1984 video game), a laserdisc game by Konami
- Badlands (1990 video game), an arcade game published by Atari Games
- Badlands, a playable map in Team Fortress 2
- Badlands, a zone in World of Warcraft

=== Other ===
- Badlands (Star Trek), a location in the fictional Star Trek universe
- Badlands (role-playing game), published 1991
- The Badlands, one of the six sectors of Mars in Red Faction: Guerrilla

== People ==
- Annette Badland (born 1950), English actress
- Badlands Booker (born 1969), American hip hop artist and competitive eater

== Other uses ==
- Operation Badlands, part of the Iraq War that began in 2003
- Battle of the Badlands, fought in Dakota Territory in 1864 between the US Army and several Native American tribes
- Badlands Motor Speedway, a dirt track racing complex in Brandon, South Dakota
- Badlands (San Francisco), a gay bar in San Francisco's Castro District
- Badlands brand fishing and hunting gear, made by the W. C. Bradley Co. subsidiary Zebco Brands
