= Gujarat LGBTQ Pride =

LGBTQ event in Gujarat, India

LGBT Pride marches have been held in the Indian state of Gujarat in various cities since 2013. The first LGBT pride march was held in Surat on 6 October 2013. Since then, pride march in the state has been held in Ahmedabad and Vadodara.

== History ==
=== 2013 ===
The first pride march in Gujarat was held in Surat on 6 October 2013. The march was organised by LGBT activist Swagat Shah. Over 150 participants from across Gujarat and Mumbai took part. The march started from New Civil Court and ended at Kargil Chowk. On 1 December, a 2nd pride march was held in Ahmedabad. The march started from IT building at and ended at Gandhi Ashram. Ahmedabad mayor Meenaxiben Patel was the chief guest and flagged off the march. Participants included school students, students from IIMA and parents of LGBTQ people. Manvendra Singh Gohil did not participate in the pride and said one should not be aping the West.

=== 2014 ===
In 2014, pride march was organised in Vadodara city on 30 November from Genda Circle to Chakli circle. On 29 November, ‘Best of Kashish’ - a movie package of the best films screened at the Kashish Mumbai International Queer Film Festival- were screened, followed by dance, music and other art performances showcasing local talent of Vadodara at Swastik Auditorium at Ellora Park area . Another march was held in Ahmedabad on 1 December from Bata House to Income Tax Circle. Over 300 people took part in the 2nd pride held in Ahmedabad.

=== 2018 ===
Pride March was held in Ahmedabad after a gap of 4 years on 24 February. The march began from Kanoria Centre for Arts and ended at Darpana Academy of Performing Arts and was attended by 200 people. A queer conference titled Sambandh too was organised a day before the march. The city of Vadodara held a pride march under the banner Vadodara Samman Yatra on 1 July. The march started from Dairy Den Circle and culminated at Yog Niketan.

=== 2019 ===
In 2019, Ahmedabad pride March was held on 24 February from Ankur Char Rasta to the Darpana Academy. A panel discussion SamBandh: Dissident sketches were held as part of the pride celebration.

=== 2020 ===
In 2020, Gandhinagar city celebrated its first pride parade on February 10. It was held at the Tibetan Market ground in Sector 6. Due to Covid pandemic, Pride month celebrations were restricted in the State. However, Virtual pride celebration Global Pride was hosted, one of whose organizers was Manvendra Singh Gohil.

=== 2022 ===
The Gandhinagar Pride Parade was organised by the Gandhinagar Queer Pride Foundation on September 25, 2022, at Satyagrah Chavni in Gandhinagar. The parade also had two auto-rikshaw services for people who can't walk. The first drag show in the state also happened. The parade was also live streamed on OTT platform EORTV.

=== 2023 ===
In 2023, pride march happened in Vadodara, organized by Lakshya Trust and in Gandhinagar. In Gandhinagar, as a part of this, Queer Mela was conducted to empower LGBTQ+ entrepreneurs; a play called ‘Dang’s Oral Folklore: The Tale of Kanasari’ was performed by P S Chari and his group; Wildlife photography exhibition was conducted and animated film were also screened.

=== 2024 ===
In 2024, LGBT March happened in Surat and Ahmedabad. The members of Sweekar - the Rainbow Parents, group for parents of LGBTQ Children also attended.

=== 2025 ===
In 2025, the pride march was held in Vadodara. It was organised by Lakshya Trust and Queerabad.
