= TriPride =

Annual LGBTQ parade and festival

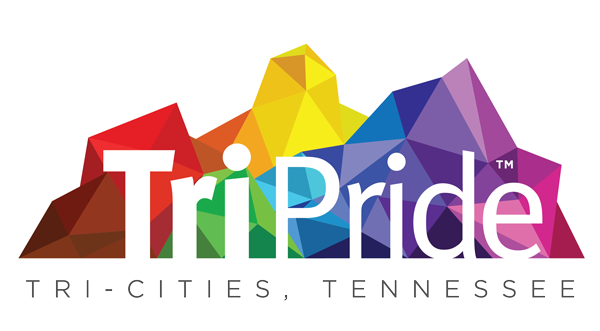
- Status: Active
- Frequency: Annually
- Location: Tri-Cities, Tennessee
- Inaugurated: September 15, 2018
- Organiser: TriPride TN, Inc.
- Website: www.tripridetn.org

TriPride is an annual LGBTQ parade and festival rotating between the cities of the Tri-Cities region in Northeast Tennessee and Southwest Virginia: Johnson City, Kingsport, and Bristol, Tennessee/Bristol, Virginia.

== History ==
=== 2018 ===
The first festival was held in September 15, 2018 at Founders Park in Johnson City. Over 10,000 people were in attendance for the event which included the first large pride parade in the Tri-Cities region.

One of the primary criticisms of the year one festival was the large police presence and perimeter that was established around the event. This was as a result of intelligence from the FBI. Over 240 officers from Johnson City and surrounding jurisdictions participated in the security of the event. The only two arrests made at the festival were for public intoxication.

=== 2019 ===
The year two festival occurred on September 7, 2019 in downtown Kingsport, Tennessee. The pride event was the first in the city's history. The festival's 2019 theme focused around the 50th anniversary of the Stonewall riots, with a particular reference to the social progress that's been made since those riots occurred in 1969. The theme was "Look How Far We've Come."

=== 2020 ===
The year three festival was to happen on August 29, 2020 in downtown Bristol, Virginia and Bristol, Tennessee. Organizers cancelled the 2020 parade and festival event due to the COVID-19 crisis. In June 2020, TriPride organizers offered free rainbow Pride Flags to any person in the community that wanted one as a way of celebrating LGBTQ+ Pride month.

=== 2021 ===
The annual festival was to happen on October 16, 2021 in downtown Bristol, Virginia and Bristol, Tennessee. The parade and festival were cancelled for the second year in a row, again due to the COVID-19 crisis. The festival was expecting an attendance of over 10,000 people.

== Organizational structure ==
The managing organization, TriPride TN, Inc., is a registered 501(c)(3) non-profit. There is a board of directors, amongst whom are an executive committee responsible for the day-to-day governing of the organization. Each board member serves a two-year term. The President and Vice President are an exception in that they serve a three-year term to ensure an overlap between boards between elections.
