= Bad Dreems =

Australian rock band

Bad//Dreems
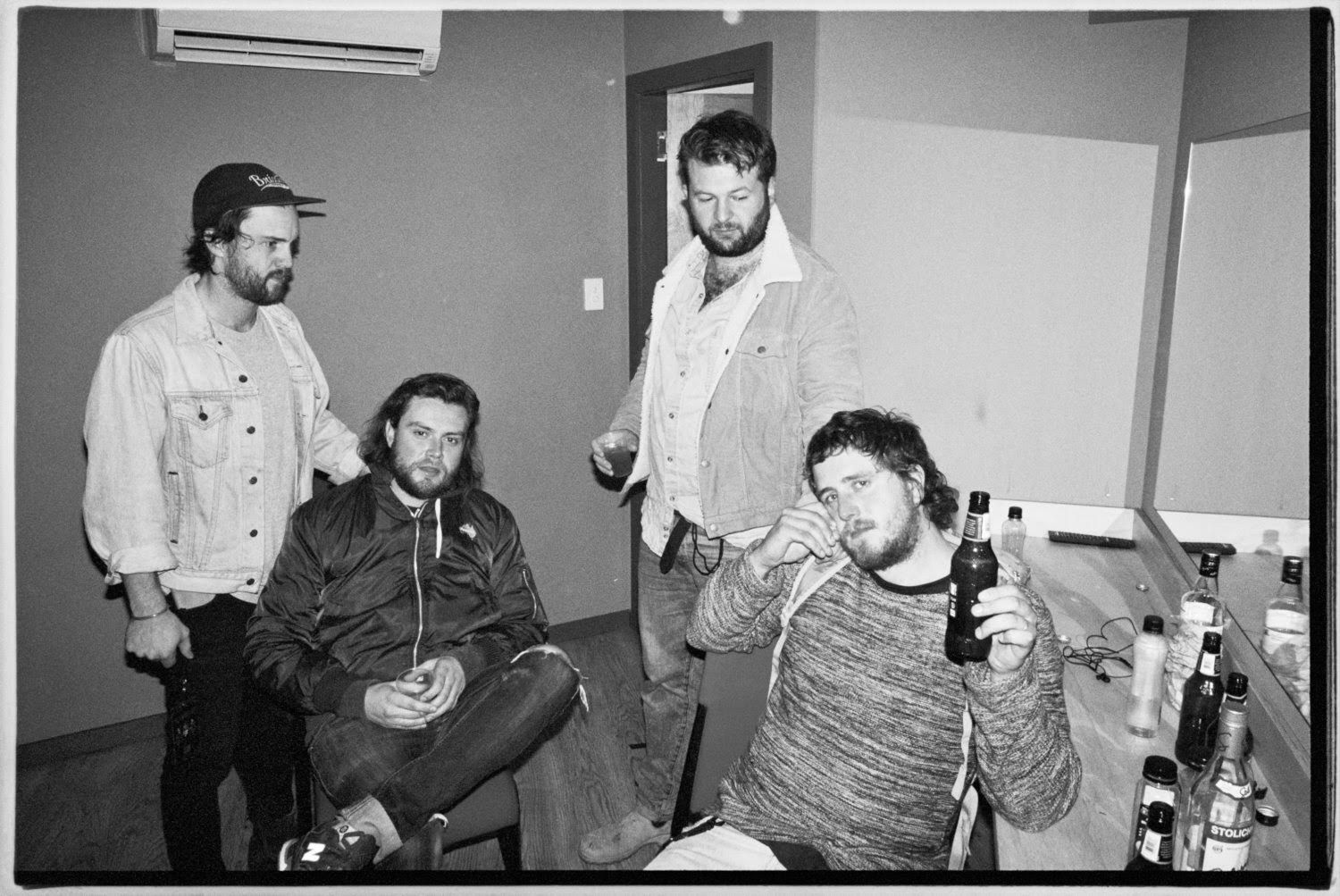
- Bad Dreems backstage at The Enmore Theatre, Sydney, in 2016

Background information
- Also known as: Young'n (2011–2012)
- Origin: Adelaide, South Australia
- Genres: Alternative rock; garage rock; pub rock; indie rock
- Years active: 2011–2026
- Labels: Farmer & the Owl; Ivy League; Mirador; Gutto Records
- Spinoffs: Wedding Motel
- Spinoff of: Dardanelles, The Shiny Brights
- Past members: Alex Cameron; Ben Marwe; Miles Wilson; Ali Wells; Deon Slaviero; James Bartold
- Website: www.baddreems.com

Bad Dreems (stylised as Bad//Dreems) were an Australian rock band from Adelaide, South Australia. The band was co-founded in 2011 by lead vocalist Ben Marwe, lead guitarist Alex Cameron, bassist James Bartold and drummer Miles Wilson. Rhythm guitarist Ali Wells joined the band in 2017, having toured with the band since 2014, while Bartold departed the band in 2022 and was replaced by Deon Slaviero. The band first formed in 2011, releasing their debut EP in 2013. They released five studio albums to date, with all of them reaching the top 40 on the ARIA charts. The group performed alongside the likes of Midnight Oil, DMA's, the Scientists and the Chats, and have toured internationally on numerous occasions.

== History ==
=== 2011–2013: Origins and Badlands ===
Bad//Dreems were formed in the middle of 2011, after guitarist Alex Cameron had moved back to Adelaide following a stint in Melbourne as a member of indie-rock band Dardanelles. While playing at a local football club, Cameron crossed paths with Ben Marwe, with whom he began writing songs. Soon, the pair were joined by drummer Miles Wilson and bassist James Bartold, who had both played with Marwe's brother Wolfgang in the now-defunct band The Shiny Brights.

Originally adopting the name Young'n, the group officially solidified their original lineup in August 2011, playing a small handful of shows around their native Adelaide and honing their skills in a warehouse next to the West End Brewery. Influenced by an array of Australian artists from the '70s and '80s, including The Saints, Paul Kelly, and The Go-Betweens, as well New Zealand artists from the Flying Nun Records label, and similarly styled groups from the US, including the Wipers and The Replacements, Bad//Dreems' musical style was initially dubbed "outsider rock" by the press, though the group have since distanced themselves from this classification.

Working with Johnny Mackay of Children Collide, Bad//Dreems recorded their first songs towards the end of 2011, releasing debut single "Chills" (paired with B-side, "Close2God") on 3 January 2012.

In July 2012, Bad//Dreems released their next single, "Too Old". The following month, the group embarked on their first large-scale tour of the country, performing across Australia with Dune Rats as the main support acts for Children Collide during their Monument album tour.

Throughout the end of 2012 and the start of 2013, Bad//Dreems began working with Paul "Woody" Annison to record their debut EP, Badlands. Released in July 2013 via independent label Mirador Records, Badlands featured a re-recorded version of debut single "Chills", along with a handful of other singles, including "Tomorrow Mountain" and "Caroline", which were issued as singles.

In December 2013, Bad//Dreems were named as part of triple j Unearthed's annual Next Crop list, appearing alongside the likes of The Bennies, Cosmo's Midnight, and Gang Of Youths.

=== 2014–2015: Dogs at Bay ===
Across 2014, Bad//Dreems played dozens of live shows, performing alongside names such as Regurgitator, King Gizzard & the Lizard Wizard, Violent Soho, the Scientists and Cosmic Psychos. In March 2014, the group performed one of their largest shows to date, appearing at the Clipsal 500 concert series on the same bill as Empire Of The Sun and Kimbra.

The following month, the band announced the release of new single "Dumb Ideas" and their subsequent signing to Ivy League Records. The single was recorded in Melbourne with producer Mark Opitz, best known for his work with Australian acts such as INXS, Cold Chisel, and The Angels, and was issued as a double A-side 7" single with "My Only Friend" in August 2014.

In October 2014, Bad//Dreems embarked on their first US tour, performing eight shows between Los Angeles and New York City, and playing alongside bands such as Tkay Maidza, Dune Rats and Cloud Nothings. For these US shows, guitarist Ali Wells played in Alex Cameron's stead due to his commitments as a surgeon. Wells would later repeat this in May 2015 during the group's debut UK tour, and would later occasionally step in at live shows for several years to play rhythm guitar – in turn, freeing up Marwe to focus solely on vocals.

In August 2015, the group released their debut album, Dogs at Bay. The record, recorded with both Opitz and Colin Wynne, debuted at #33 on the ARIA charts, and in 2021, was named in the "Honourable Mentions" section of Rolling Stone Australia's list of the 'Greatest Australian Albums of All Time'.

In September 2015, the group played a headline show at Adelaide venue Fowler's Live which was recorded and released by local record label Rad Jams Exchange. The following month, the group made their debut as part of triple j's Like a Version series, performing a cover of The Weeknd's "Can't Feel My Face" with guest vocals from Isabella Manfredi from Sydney outfit The Preatures.

In November 2015, The Go-Betweens' Robert Forster guest-programmed an episode of Australian music programme Rage, broadcasting Bad//Dreems' "My Only Friend" and describing the track as "a masterpiece of Australian rock". Two years later, Forster would join the band during their performance at the Splendour in the Grass festival, playing the song with the band, along with a version of The Go-Betweens' "Spring Rain".

=== 2016–2017: Gutful ===
In 2016, Bad//Dreems returned to the studio with Opitz and Wynne to record their second album, Gutful. The band gave fans their first taste of the new album in October 2016, sharing lead single "Mob Rule". The track was critical of racist attitudes throughout Australia, and was described as "painting a disturbing picture of dystopic Australia with pure pub rock perfection".

In February 2017, the band shared their next single, "Feeling Remains". The single was also accompanied by a video which saw Bad//Dreems joined by former Recovery host Dylan Lewis as they performed a set in the style of the long-defunct programme.

Bad//Dreems released Gutful in April 2017, with the record debuting at #23 on the ARIA charts. In an interview released alongside the record, guitarist Alex Cameron explained that Gutful saw the band trying to push towards more of '70s-influenced post-punk sound, with the focus being that of capturing the group in their live element with little additional production.

Later in 2017, Bad//Dreems were chosen as one of the support acts for the Adelaide leg of Midnight Oil's Great Circle tour, with the band opening Midnight Oil's first South Australian performance in 15 years alongside Spiderbait. Also in 2017, Wells was inducted as a full-time member of Bad//Dreems, expanding the line-up officially to a five-piece.

=== 2018–2019: Doomsday Ballet ===
2018 served as an uncharacteristically quiet year for Bad//Dreems, with the group performing less than ten public shows throughout the year. Towards the end of the year, the group entered Adelaide's Twin Earth Recording with Burke Reid and Jack Ladder to begin the recording of their third album.

In May 2019, the group were announced as the latest signing to Wollongong label Farmer And The Owl ahead of the release of their new album, with lead single "Double Dreaming" released just weeks later. The release of the single coincided with the band's second UK tour, which also featured two support performances for Midnight Oil during the band's appearances at the O2 Apollo in Manchester and the O2 Academy in Brixton.

In October 2019, the group released their third album, Doomsday Ballet, with the record hitting #38 on the ARIA charts, and becoming their third consecutive release to chart within the top 40. In an interview conducted in support of the album, guitarist Alex Cameron explained that the record had emerged from roughly 100 different demos. Meanwhile, a separate interview saw drummer Miles Wilson allude to a stylistic shift within the record's sound, explaining that the band's motto within the studio had been "less pub, more art", indicating a concerted effort to avoid being pigeonholed within the pub rock genre.

In November 2019, Bad//Dreems again appeared as part of triple j's Like A Version series, this time covering the Warumpi Band's "Blackfella/Whitefella" alongside guests Peter Garrett, Emily Wurramara and Mambali. The same month saw the group return to the UK for a 15-date tour supporting The Chats.

In late December, the group's touring prospects were halted as a result of the 2019–20 Australian bushfire season. After the band's appearance at the Lorne edition of Falls Festival was cancelled, the band took part in a fundraising concert alongside These New South Whales, Totally Unicorn, and Eaglemont. In February 2020, the group hosted their own Fire Aid benefit concert, featuring appearances from Pond, Children Collide, The Mark of Cain and West Thebarton. The concert would eventually raise more than $200,000 for the likes of BlazeAid, the CFS, and SAVEM.

=== 2020–2021: Effects of the COVID-19 pandemic ===
In early 2020, Bad//Dreems were one of the many artists affected by the sudden onset of the COVID-19 pandemic. In March 2020, the group were in the midst of another UK tour when the pandemic's impact necessitated a cancellation of all remaining dates and a return to Australia. Frontman Ben Marwe later released a satirical song titled "I Wanna Self-Isolate With You", jokingly dubbing it "lyrically the best work we've done".

In May, the group shared new single "Desert Television". The track had been recorded with Rory Attwell during their time in London, and was released in the aftermath of being forced to cancel a number of regional tour dates due to restrictions imposed as a result of the pandemic.

Bad//Dreems were forced to cancel a total of 22 tour dates throughout 2020, including numerous festival appearances and a full regional tour. The group took part in a number of livestreams during this time, including the Isol-Aid Festival, while Marwe also launched a semi-regular "Sunday Morning Songbook" series. The group made their return to the live stage in November 2020 before embarking on the Small Town Big Sound tour in April 2021.

In September 2021, Marwe announced the launch of his solo project, Wedding Motel. His debut EP, Childhood Beach, was released in November, with the title track also featuring lyrics by Alex Cameron.

=== 2022–2024: Hoo Ha! ===
In January 2022, Bad//Dreems revealed that they were in the process of writing and recording their fourth studio album, working with producer Dan Luscombe at Melbourne's Soundpark Studios In August 2022, the band released the first single from their new album, with "Mansfield 6.0" receiving its debut airing on triple j's Home & Hosed on 3 August 2022. That same month saw the band tour through the Northern Territory as part of the regional touring initiative Guts. A second single, "Jack", followed in October ahead of a national tour in support of the band's two newly released tracks.

In December 2022, bassist James Bartold announced that he was leaving the band in order to spend more time with his family. Split System bassist Deon Salviero has since taken Bartold's place on the live stage, while Children Collide drummer Ryan Caesar briefly replaced Wilson during shows in early 2023.

On 3 March 2023, the group released "See You Tomorrow" and announced their fourth studio album Hoo Ha!, which was released on 19 May 2023

=== 2025–2026: Ultra Dundee and indefinite hiatus ===
In October 2025, the group announced their newly established label, Gutto Records and released "Shadowland". In December 2025, they announced the forthcoming release of Ultra Dundee, their fifth studio album. Upon the album's release in March 2026, the band announced an indefinite hiatus following the conclusion of their Ultra Dundee tour in May.

== Music style and influences ==
The band have cited a number of Australian and North American rock and punk bands of the 1970s and 1980s as their influences, with the likes of post-punk outfits the Wipers, Devo, Joy Division, Wire, and Television specifically informing their own self-described "rough and tumble brand of jangling rock and roll". Likewise, their music itself has seen the band explore ideas of Australian dystopia and isolation, suburban ennui, and male identity, while their earlier work was said by guitarist Alex Cameron to have been inspired by the bizarre and darker side of Adelaide history such as the Beaumont children disappearance, The Family Murders, and the Adelaide Bikie Wars.

As the group have continued, their musical influences and lyrical focuses have also expanded. A review for second album Gutful specifically noted that the band "can go from sounding like AC/DC to Nirvana and even Billy Joel", while also pointing out that the record saw the group "transcend" their earlier post-punk influences.

In an interview surrounding the release of Doomsday Ballet, Cameron cited the likes of Brexit, the resurgence of Pauline Hanson, and the Presidency of Donald Trump as having influenced the political focuses on their third album, though he similarly denied the notion that Bad//Dreems had become a "political band". Meanwhile, a contemporary review of the album saw the band's sound described as "new wave-cum-rock ‘n’ roll".

The group have also been somewhat vocal against the idea of their music being pigeonholed under the all-encompassing genre of pub-rock. In 2017, Cameron explained to Vice that it "certainly isn't a term [they] ever felt comfortable with", while also stating the belief that "if people are going to judge you by an all-encompassing genre term then they can piss off". In 2020, frontman Ben Marwe echoed Cameron's statement, explaining that Doomsday Ballet was composed with the idea of sounding "less pub, more sort of avant-garde art rock".

== Members ==
Final line-up

- Ben Marwe – lead vocals, occasional acoustic guitar (2011–2026), rhythm guitar (2011–2017)
- Alex Cameron – lead guitar, backing vocals (2011–2026)
- Miles Wilson – drums (2011–2026)
- Deon Slaviero – bass (2025–2026; touring musician 2023–2025)
- Mathias Dowle – rhythm guitar, keyboards, backing vocals (2026; touring substitute for Ali Wells)

Former members

- James Bartold – bass, backing vocals (2011–2022)
- Ali Wells – rhythm guitar, backing vocals (2017–2026; touring musician 2014–2017)

Former touring musicians

- Ryan Caesar – drums (2023; substitute for Miles Wilson)

== Discography ==
=== Studio albums ===
Title	Album details	Peak chart positions
Title	Album details	AUS
Dogs at Bay	Released: 21 August 2015; Label: Ivy League (IVY269, IVY 292, IVY293); Formats: CD, LP, digital	33
Gutful	Released: 21 April 2017; Label: Ivy League (IVY358, IVY359); Formats: CD, LP, digital	23
Doomsday Ballet	Released: 18 October 2019; Label: Farmer & the Owl (FATO024); Formats: CD, LP, cassette, digital	38
Hoo Ha!	Released: 19 May 2023; Label: Farmer & the Owl (FATO052); Formats: CD, LP, CS, digital	10
Ultra Dundee	Released: 20 March 2026; Label: Gutto Records; Formats: CD, LP, digital	5

=== Live albums ===
Title	Album details
Live at Fowler's	Released: 11 November 2015; Label: Rad Jams Exchange (RAD-002); Formats: CS, digital
Quality Meats	Released: 13 December 2024; Label: Gutto Records (GUT001); Formats: LP (limited to 300), digital

=== EPs ===
Title	EP details
Badlands	Released: 19 July 2013; Label: Mirador Records (RAD-002); Formats: CD, LP, digital

=== Singles ===
Title	Year	Album
"Chills"	2012	Badlands EP
"Close2God"	2012	Non-album single
"Caroline"	2012	Badlands EP
"Too Old"	2012	Badlands EP
"Tomorrow Mountain"	2013	Badlands EP
"Dumb Ideas"	2014	Dogs at Bay
"My Only Friend"	2014	Dogs at Bay
"Cuffed & Collared"	2015	Dogs at Bay
"Hiding to Nothing"	2015	Dogs at Bay
"Bogan Pride"	2015	Dogs at Bay
"Mob Rule"	2016	Gutful
"Feeling Remains"	2017	Gutful
"Double Dreaming"	2019	Doomsday Ballet
"Morning Rain"	2019	Doomsday Ballet
"Blackfella/Whitefella" (triple j Like a Version)	2019	Non-album singles
"Desert Television"	2020	Non-album singles
"Mansfield 6.0"	2022	Hoo Ha!
"Jack"	2022	Hoo Ha!
"See You Tomorrow"	2023	Hoo Ha!
"New Breeze"	2023	Hoo Ha!
"Shadowland"	2025	Ultra Dundee
"Ultra Dundee"	2025	Ultra Dundee
"Irish Airman"	2026	Ultra Dundee
"Night Shooting"	2026	Ultra Dundee

== Awards and nominations ==
Bad Dreems were awarded a Robert Stigwood Fellowship, which provided mentorship and professional development, by the Music Development Office in SA.

=== AIR Awards ===
The Australian Independent Record Awards (commonly known informally as AIR Awards) is an annual awards night to recognise, promote and celebrate the success of Australia's Independent Music sector.

Year	Nominee / work	Award	Result
2015	"Cuffed and Collared"	Best Independent Single/EP	Nominated
2018	Gutful	Best Independent Hard Rock or Punk Album	Nominated
2020	Doomsday Ballet	Best Independent Rock Album or EP	Nominated

=== ARIA Music Awards ===
The ARIA Music Awards is an annual award ceremony event celebrating the Australian music industry.

Year	Nominee / work	Award	Result	Ref.
2023	Hoo Ha!	Best Rock Album	Nominated	

=== J Awards ===
The J Awards are an annual series of Australian music awards that were established by the Australian Broadcasting Corporation's youth-focused radio station Triple J. They commenced in 2005.

Year	Nominee / work	Award	Result	Ref.
2023	Bad Dreems	Double J Artist of the Year	Nominated	

=== National Live Music Awards ===
The National Live Music Awards (NLMAs) are a broad recognition of Australia's diverse live industry, celebrating the success of the Australian live scene. The awards commenced in 2016.

Year	Nominee / work	Award	Result
2016	Themselves	South Australian Live Act of the Year	Won
2020	Themselves	South Australian Live Act of the Year	Nominated

=== South Australian Music Awards ===
The South Australian Music Awards (previously known as the Fowler's Live Music Awards) are annual awards that exist to recognise, promote and celebrate excellence in the South Australian contemporary music industry. They commenced in 2012.

Year	Nominee / work	Award	Result (wins only)
2013	Bad//Dreems	Best Indie Artist	Won
2014	Bad//Dreems	Best Indie Artist	Won
2014	Bad//Dreems	SA Songwriters(s) of the Year	Won
2015	Bad//Dreems	Best Live Act	Won
2016	Bad//Dreems	Best Release	Won
2016	Bad//Dreems	Best Group	Won
2017	Bad//Dreems	Most Popular Rock Artist	Won
