= Doomsday Ballet =

Studio album by Bad Dreems
- Released: 18 October 2019
- Length: 42:49
- Label: Farmer and the Owl
- Producer: Burke Reid; Jack Ladder

Bad Dreems chronology
Gutful (2017)	Doomsday Ballet (2019)	Hoo Ha! (2023)

Singles from Doomsday Ballet
- 1. "Double Dreaming" Released: 30 May 2019; 2. "Morning Rain" Released: 19 September 2019

Doomsday Ballet is the third studio album by Australian band Bad Dreems. Released in October 2019, it peaked at number 38 on the Australian ARIA Albums Chart, their third consecutive album to reach the top 40.

At the AIR Awards of 2020, the album was nominated for Best Independent Rock Album or EP.

== Album details ==
Guitarist and main songwriter Alex Cameron said, "We probably had 100 songs written, then we'd done 50 multi-track demos ourselves, and from them we chose about 25, and from those, Burke and Jack Ladder chose the final 12, so we were really confident in the songs." The band members all had day jobs in Victoria and South Australia, so writing and demoing was done in "immersive" weekends.

Marwe said the new album was an attempt to "step away" from the pub-rock labels for their previous albums. "Pub rock has a certain stigma to it but if you listen to the maturity of the songs of Don Walker or the Angels, yeah, there is that pub mentality to it but it’s all quite sophisticated. People can call it whatever they want." Elsewhere, Wilson said, "Our motto in the studio with Burke and Ladder was 'Less Pub, More Art' and we really tried to adhere to that".

The song "Gallows" was mostly written by Marwe. Cameron said, "I think it’s about his new fatherhood, and a number of things around that. It’s a very Lou Reed-influenced track. We’ve always loved the track "Coney Island Baby" by Lou Reed, and the way that he uses saxophone and backing vocals. We’ve always wanted to include more horns and other instruments, and we finally got to sneak them in on that track – only because we didn’t end up getting around to recording it in the main session, so we kind of recorded it ourselves."

== Reception ==
Bernard Zuel said, "you can hear the disdain, if not outright anger. And yeah, their views are sometimes objectionable and blunt, with no attempt to defend them in the song. Because that's not the point. As Randy Newman has spent five decades explaining, its a story, it's a type."

X-press Mag noted, "it may not be everyone's cup of tea with its hard style, raw lyrics and intimidating pace (at times) but there is a lot to be appreciated when listened to in full" and a "rich range of diversity". The Sydney Morning Herald agreed, "Their propulsive rants are now counterpointed by evocative textures, their fury has an existential undertow, and their mid-tempo ballads reveal a bittersweet beauty." Rock Sins said, "The slowing of pace in the album’s middle section allows the stark, Larkinesque realism of the lyrics to shine".

== Track listing ==
1. "Morning Rain" – 3:13
2. "Pist Christ" – 1:59
3. "Sonny" – 3:26
4. "Double Dreaming" – 3:08
5. "Harry's Station" – 3:40
6. "Cannonball" – 4:20
7. "Salad" – 3:15
8. "Sally's Place" – 4:29
9. "Low Life" – 2:52
10. "Northern" – 4:17
11. "Younger" – 4:12
12. "Gallows" – 3:58

== Personnel ==
- James Bartold – bass
- Miles Wilson – drums
- Alex Cameron – guitar, violin
- Ben Marwe – vocals, acoustic guitar, piano

=== Additional personnel ===
- Cayn Borthwick – alto saxophone
- Max Dowling – saxophone
- Jack Ladder – guitar, synth, organ, piano
- Daniel Sutton – trumpet
- Burke Reid – producer, engineer
- Paul French – engineer, additional production

== Charts ==
Chart performance for Doomsday Ballet
Chart (2019)	Peak position
Australian Albums (ARIA)	38
