= Global Pride =

Online LGBT Pride event

Global Pride was an online LGBT Pride event, which took place on June 27, 2020. Organized as a response to the international COVID-19 pandemic, which forced the cancellation of most traditional LGBTQ pride events due to social distancing restrictions on large public gatherings, the event featured livestreamed social and cultural programming organized by various LGBT community groups and pride committees around the world. According to a list maintained by the European Pride Organizers Association (EPOA), nearly 500 Pride events have been cancelled around the world.

According to InterPride executive Andrew Baker, "From a digital perspective, our community already has the tools to engage in periods of isolation like this. Our community is experiencing an opportunity to do that in more meaningful ways. Our community is also experiencing a bunch of reminders of why we have those skills."

== Participants ==
Spearheaded by InterPride and EPOA, the event also featured the participation of CSD Deutschland, Fierté Canada Pride, Orgullo Latin America, Svenska Pride, the Sydney Gay and Lesbian Mardi Gras, the UK Pride Organisers Network and the US Association of Prides, as well as individual pride events which are members of the coordinating organizations. Scheduled performers included Pabllo Vittar, Ava Max, Olivia Newton-John, Deborah Cox, Kristine W, Thelma Houston, Bright Light Bright Light, Courtney Act, Steve Grand, Rachael Sage, Adam Lambert, Dixie Chicks, Greg Gould & Inaya Day, as well as a video tribute to the late George Michael as an important figure in LGBTQ history. Speakers included Carlos Alvarado Quesada, the president of Costa Rica; Erna Solberg, the prime minister of Norway; Xavier Bettel, the prime minister of Luxembourg; First Minister of Scotland Nicola Sturgeon, Scarlet Skylar Rae and Manvendra Singh Gohil, a prince and LGBTQ activist from India.

== See also ==
- Impact of the COVID-19 pandemic on the LGBT community
