= Ultra Dundee =

Studio album by Bad Dreems
- Released: 20 March 2026
- Recorded: 2022, May 2025 (Note: "Irish Airman" was recorded in 2022, while the rest of the album was recorded in May 2025.)
- Studio: Mixmasters (Adelaide): Phaedra
- Label: Gutto
- Producer: Dan Luscombe; Bad Dreems

Bad Dreems chronology
Quality Meats (2024)	Ultra Dundee (2026)

Singles from Ultra Dundee
- 1. "Shadowland" Released: 31 October 2025; 2. "Ultra Dundee" Released: 10 December 2025; 3. "Irish Airman" Released: 20 February 2026; 4. "Night Shooting" Released: 20 March 2026

Ultra Dundee is the fifth studio album by Australian band Bad Dreems. It was announced on 10 December 2025, alongside its title track. Ultra Dundee was released on 20 March 2026. The album will be their last before an "indefinite hiatus" following this release and upcoming tour across April and May.

The album debuted at number 5 on the ARIA Chart, the band's highest charting album. Upon hearing this the band said "The last thing we won was the D-grade amateur footy flag, so this is a great honour. Thanks to all our amazing fans who bought an album and the team which helped us release this independently. Catch us on our victory lap around Oz before we hang up the boots indefinitely."

== Reception ==
ABC called it "a big, raw, guitar-driven record that leans into the band's long-running exploration of Australian identity, masculinity and myth."

Al Newstead from Double J said on the album "Bad//Dreems lament our country's poor treatment of the environment and First Nations people. How a lack of leadership and empathy has allowed racism, bigotry, and ignorance to take up primary residence in the modern Australian psyche." Adding the album "cements their status as one of Australia's most criminally underrated bands."

Darryl Sterdan from Tinnitist said "Ultra Dundee is a crystallisation and extension of the vision that began with their seminal debut Dogs At Bay and has continued over their subsequent releases."

== Track listing ==
All tracks are written by Bad Dreems.

1. "Slaughterhouse '85" – 4:16
2. "Ultra Dundee" – 2:58
3. "Shadowlands" – 3:52
4. "January 26" – 5:07
5. "Night Shooting" – 4:18
6. "Kangaroo Skull" – 3:38
7. "Irish Airman" – 4:01
8. "St Francis of Andamooka" – 5:09
9. "Firestorm" – 2:40
10. "Truro" – 4:12

== Personnel ==
Credits adapted from the album's liner notes.

=== Bad Dreems ===
- Alex Cameron – performance, recording, production on all tracks except "Irish Airman"
- Ben Marwe – performance, recording, production on all tracks except "Irish Airman"
- Ali Wells – performance, recording, production on all tracks except "Irish Airman"
- Miles Wilson – performance, recording, production on all tracks except "Irish Airman"

=== Additional contributors ===
- Dan Luscombe – production on all tracks except "Irish Airman"
- Aaron Cupples – mixing
- Tom Barnes – engineering on all tracks except "Irish Airman"
- Joe Carra – mastering
- John Lee – production and engineering on "Irish Airman"
- Mclean Stephenson – cover photography
- Miles Wilson – cover design

== Charts ==
Chart performance for Ultra Dundee
Chart (2026)	Peak position
Australian Albums (ARIA)	5
