= Victor Chikalogwe =

Malawian LGBTQ activist

- Citizenship: Malawian
- Known for: LGBT activism

Victor Pilirani Chikalogwe is a Malawian LGBT activist and coordinator for the refugee project of PASSOP. He was previously programme coordinator for the orphanage Home of Hope. Chikalogwe initially left Malawi after his family rejected him because of his sexuality, moving to South Africa as there were more LGBT protections.
