= Gutful =

Studio album by Bad Dreems
- Released: 21 April 2017
- Studio: Thirty Mill Studios, Melbourne, Australia
- Length: 37:29
- Label: Ivy League
- Producer: Colin Wynne, Mark Opitz

Bad Dreems chronology
Dogs at Bay (2015)	Gutful (2017)	Doomsday Ballet (2019)

Singles from Gutful
- 1. "Mob Rule" Released: May 2016; 2. "Feeling Remains" Released: February 2017

Gutful is the second studio album by Australian band Bad Dreems, released on 21 August 2015 via Ivy League Records. The album peaked at number 23 on the Australian ARIA Albums Chart.

The album was recorded over 12 days with bassist James Bartold telling Scenestr that the title refers to "dissatisfaction with decisions being made and people across the world are having a gutful of everything that's going on." Badtold added, "We don't try to push a political agenda on people. Since our first record, we've tried to express our viewpoint on things that are happening in Australian society."

At the AIR Awards of 2018, the album was nominated for Best Independent Hard Rock or Punk Album.

== Reception ==
Professional ratings
Review scores
Source	Rating
The Guardian	3/5 stars

Andrew Stafford from The Guardian wrote, "There's nothing subtle about this Adelaide rock band's second album, with a meaty sound and choruses made to shout back from the mosh pit."

Chris Bright from Beat Magazine felt that "Overall this is a uniquely bold album from a uniquely bold Aussie band", calling Johnny Irony "an instant pub classic".

Tyler Jenker from Tone Deaf opined that "Gutful is definitely a record that takes an uncompromising look at the current state of affairs, with tracks like 'Mob Rule' sounding like an Aussie revival of Billy Joel's 'We Didn't Start the Fire', and the title track addressing racism, drug use and Donald Trump.” Jenker also said "Gutful also sees the Baddies expanding their horizons somewhat, experimenting by way of the inclusion of a hammond organ in 'Pagan Rage', and taking on a more sombre approach in the closing track, 'A Million Times Alone', which includes a saxophone interjection by Keith Wilson, father of the group's drummer Miles."

== Track listing ==
All songs written and performed by Bad Dreems

1. "Johnny Irony" – 2:29
2. "Mob Rule" – 2:41
3. "Blood Love" – 3:58
4. "Gutful" – 4:06
5. "By My Side" – 3:07
6. "Pagan Rage" – 3:44
7. "1000 Miles Away" – 3:59
8. "Feeling Remains" – 3:13
9. "Nice Guy" – 3:18
10. "Make You Love Me" – 2:45
11. "Million Times Alone" – 4:09

== Personnel ==
- James Bartold – bass
- Miles Wilson – drums
- Alex Cameron – guitar
- Ben Marwe – vocals, guitar
- Ali Wells – guitar

== Charts ==
Chart performance for Gutful
Chart (2017)	Peak position
Australian Albums (ARIA)	23

== Release history ==
Release history and formats for Gutful
Region	Date	Format	Label	Catalogue
Various	21 April 2017	CD; digital	Ivy League	IVY359
Australia	21 April 2017	LP	Ivy League	IVY358
