= Badland (video game) =

2013 mobile video game

- App Store icon
- Developer: Frogmind
- Publishers: Frogmind; Untold Tales (Switch)
- Engine: Cocos2d
- Platforms: Microsoft Windows, OS X, Linux, PlayStation 3, PlayStation 4, Xbox One, Wii U, Nintendo Switch, PlayStation Vita, iOS, Android, Windows Phone 8, BlackBerry 10, Kindle Fire, tvOS
- Release: 4 April 2013: iOS; WW: 4 April 2013; Android; WW: 29 November 2013; Windows Phone; WW: 3 June 2014; BlackBerry 10; WW: 18 February 2015; PS3, PS4, PS Vita; NA: 26 May 2015; EU: 28 May 2015; Windows, OS X, Linux; WW: 28 May 2015; Xbox One; WW: 29 May 2015; Wii U; WW: 30 July 2015; tvOS; WW: 2015; Nintendo Switch; WW: 6 August 2021
- Genre: Adventure
- Modes: Single-player, multiplayer

Badland (stylized BADLAND) is a video game developed and published by Frogmind (now HypeHype). It was first released on iOS and Android in 2013. It was released on Windows Phone 8 in June 2014. There is also a Game of the Year Edition that was released in May 2015 for PlayStation 3, PlayStation 4, PlayStation Vita, Xbox One, Wii U, and Steam for Linux, Microsoft Windows, and OS X. In August 2021 it was released for Nintendo Switch by Untold Tales.

In December 2015, its sequel Badland 2 was released on iOS and Android. For the same platforms, a real-time strategy spin-off, Badland Brawl, was released in September 2018, where gameplay is a mash-up between Angry Birds and Clash Royale. A multiplayer party game spin-off, Badland Party was released in May 2022 on iOS, macOS and tvOS through Apple Arcade.

== Gameplay ==
The player controls a little black creature called a Clony (the plural is Clonies and groups of them are called Clones) through the woods of the game. Beginning in Day I, the game progresses through four stages which consist of Dawn, Noon, Dusk, and Night, each with a separate color scheme and new theme of traps. As the player goes through Day I, egg-shaped machines begin to come out of the water of the background. Heading into the night, the machines begin to turn on and the game becomes harder as the machines become part of the dangers of the forest. Eventually, the character succeeds in disabling the machines and the machines become dormant once again until Day II begins it all over. Most of Day II is similar in plot structure, but smaller octopus-like machines begin to make themselves known and the animals in the forest begin to disappear. The last level includes saving a rabbit that was hanging by its foot and eventually coming to fly in front of a giant eye of one of the machines, leaving a cliffhanger into possible future updates. Also included in the game are possible in-app purchases that continue the story with some of Clony's friends, including ones nicknamed Snorf and Fury, featured in their own level packs.

== Development ==
Badland was created by Finland-based Frogmind Games. In early 2014, level pack Doomsday was released, featuring Fury and his escape from the machine infested woods. Also included is the Daydream level pack in which Snorf escapes, and finding the magic of the forest makes the woods not all as it seems to be. In 2015 a new multiplayer feature was released which allowed up to 4 players to play at the same time. A level editor was added, allowing players to create their own levels and upload them online to "Level World", where other players can play and rate them.

== Reception ==
Reception

Aggregate score
Aggregator	Score
Metacritic	iOS: 85/100; PS4: 76/100; PC: 79/100; XONE: 69/100; WIIU: 80/100

Review score
Publication	Score
TouchArcade	iOS: 4.5/5

The game won Apple Inc.'s 2013 iPad Game of the Year award. It also won the Grand Prix award in the 10th annual International Mobile Gaming Awards. The game has a Metacritic score of 85/100 based on 20 critic reviews.
