= Dogs at Bay =

Studio album by Bad Dreems
- Released: 21 August 2015
- Recorded: 2014–2015
- Studios: Thirty Mill Studios, Melbourne, Australia
- Length: 40:19
- Label: Ivy League
- Producers: Colin Wynne, Mark Opitz

Bad Dreems chronology
Badlands (2013)	Dogs at Bay (2015)	Gutful (2017)

Singles from Dogs at Bay
- 1. "Dumb Ideas" Released: April 2014; 2. "My Only Friend" Released: August 2014; 3. "Cuffed & Collared" Released: March 2015; 4. "Hiding to Nothing" Released: July 2015; 5. "Bogan Pride" Released: November 2015

Dogs at Bay is the debut studio album by Australian band Bad Dreems, released on 21 August 2015 via Ivy League Records. The album peaked at number 38 on the Australian ARIA Albums Chart.

== Reception ==
Professional ratings
Review scores
Source	Rating
News.com.au	3.5/5 stars

Mikey Cahill from news.com.au called the album "mucky", writing, "On their debut album Bad//Dreems place familiar garage grooves next to the Weetbix-and-Jager vocals of Ben Marwe with almost balletic poise."

Chelsea Deeley from Music Feeds wrote, "Throughout the 12 tracks on this album, stories and anecdotes from a mostly typical Australian upbringing are rife. But it's a welcome slice through the heavy imports that are shoved down our ears daily."

Meredith McLean from The AU Review ranked the album as the 29th best Australian album of 2015, saying "Bad//Dreems stand out against other burgeoning Australian rock bands… rather than entering a retrospective psychedelic culture that is growing more and more in Australia, they've gone back to the pleasure of Australia's pure pub rock… This re-visitation of rock receives a welcomed reception from its listeners."

== Track listing ==
All songs written and performed by Bad Dreems

1. "New Boys" – 3:26
2. "Cuffed & Collared" – 2:53
3. "Bogan Pride" – 3:29
4. "My Only Friend" – 2:58
5. "Hiding to Nothing" – 3:24
6. "Naden" – 4:01
7. "Hume" – 3:38
8. "Dumb Ideas" – 2:37
9. "Ghost Gums" – 3:13
10. "Paradise" – 3:52
11. "Blood in My Eyes" – 3:17
12. "Sacred Ground" – 3:31

== Personnel ==
- James Bartold – bass, backing vocals
- Miles Wilson – drums, percussion
- Alex Cameron – lead guitar, backing vocals
- Ben Marwe – lead vocals, rhythm guitar, acoustic guitar

== Charts ==
Chart performance for Dogs at Bay
Chart (2015)	Peak position
Australian Albums (ARIA)	33

== Release history ==
Release history and formats for Dogs at Bay
Region	Date	Format	Label	Catalogue
Various	21 August 2015	CD; digital	Ivy League	IVY292/IVY293
Australia	21 August 2015	LP	Ivy League	IVY269
Australia	21 August 2019	LP (limited edition)	Waxx Lyrical	WAXX001
