= Hoo Ha! =

Studio album by Bad Dreems
- Released: 19 May 2023
- Studios: Soundpark Studios, Melbourne
- Length: 45:07
- Labels: Farmer and the Owl; BMG
- Producer: Dan Luscombe

Bad Dreems chronology
Doomsday Ballet (2019)	Hoo Ha! (2023)

Singles from Hoo Ha!
- 1. "Mansfield 6.0" Released: 5 August 2022; 2. "Jack" Released: 14 October 2022; 3. "See You Tomorrow" Released: 3 March 2023; 4. "New Breeze" Released: 28 April 2023

Hoo Ha! is the fourth studio album by Australian band Bad Dreems. It was announced on 3 March 2023, alongside single "See You Tomorrow". Hoo Ha! was released on 19 May 2023 and peaked at number 10 on the Australian ARIA Albums Chart, becoming the band's first top ten album.

The band described the album as "pub-rock-meets-art-rock", with their rock 'n' roll matched with "literate, visceral lyrics that are equal parts character studies and modern commentary on the darker underbelly of Australia".

At the 2023 ARIA Music Awards, the album was nominated for Best Rock Album.

== Reception ==
Nathan Whittle from Louder Than War said "Where many bands nowadays take pointed aims at those above, on Hoo Ha, Bad//Dreems turn their gaze inwards to often inhabit the characters whose ideals and desires shape their actions, regardless of consequence. It's a tack that adds a personification to the angst that flows through the lyrics, all over a backdrop of great riotous post-pub-punk. Throughout there's a critique of the closed claustrophobic minds of the songs' protagonists, bringing the subject into sharp view " Whittle called the album a "triumph".

Al Newstead from Double J said "Building on the ferocity of 2019's Doomsday Ballet, Hoo Ha! fills in the gaps, weaving punchy political protest with searing sonic assaults that, occasionally, break into disarmingly melodic or atmospheric moments. Think AC/DC covering The Go-Betweens or Midnight Oil at their most intense."

When Bad//Dreems were nominated for Double J Artist of the Year, they wrote Hoo Ha! was, "an unflinching take on the current state of social and political affairs in our country, set to a brand of rock'n'roll that sounds both muscular and vulnerable, as well as completely Australian." Hoo Ha! was also rated their second best album of the year, where it was written, "the band excoriate the cultures of bigotry, xenophobia, greed, and hypocrisy that abound in our great southern land. What makes the album truly great though is the complete absence of self-righteousness."

4ZZZ said, "the band sound bigger, punchier and more confident, with more of a focus on tone than on previous albums. Meanwhile, Marwe appears to have spent even more time developing and refining his lyrics, sharpening each line of commentary and carefully crafting each sinister stereotype. "See You Tomorrow" sounds like the Fall, if Mark E. Smith hailed from regional Australia, drank Resch's instead of real ale, and snorted meth instead of speed."

== Track listing ==
1. "Waterfalls" – 2:58
2. "Mansfield 6.0" – 3:18
3. "Jack" – 3:24
4. "Shame" – 2:58
5. "Mallee" – 4:20
6. "No Island" – 3:12
7. "Southern Heat" – 3:52
8. "Black Monday" – 2:38
9. "Collapse!" – 3:06
10. "New Breeze" – 3:04
11. "Desert Television" – 3:47
12. "See You Tomorrow" – 2:43
13. "Godless" – 4:49
14. "Hoo Ha!" – 0:58

== Charts ==
Chart performance for Hoo Ha!
Chart (2023)	Peak position
Australian Albums (ARIA)	10
