= Single-player video game =

Video game that permits only one player

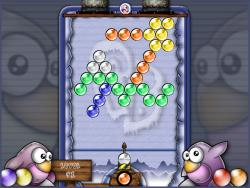
A screenshot of the game Frozen Bubble

A single-player video game is a video game where input from only one player is expected throughout the gameplay. Video games in general can feature several game modes, including single-player modes designed to be played by a single player in addition to multi-player modes.

Most modern console games, PC games and arcade games are designed so that they can be played by a single player; although many of these games have modes that allow two or more players to play (not necessarily simultaneously), very few actually require more than one player for the game to be played. The Unreal Tournament series is one example of such.

== History ==
The earliest video games, such as Tennis for Two (1958), Spacewar! (1962), and Pong (1972), were symmetrical games designed to be played by two players. Single-player games gained popularity only after this, with early titles such as Speed Race (1974) and Space Invaders (1978).

The reason for this, according to Raph Koster, is down to a combination of several factors: increasingly sophisticated computers and interfaces that enabled asymmetric gameplay, cooperative gameplay and story delivery within a gaming framework, coupled with the fact that the majority of early games players had introverted personality types (according to the Myers-Briggs personality type indicator).

Although most modern games incorporate a single-player element either as the core or as one of several game modes, single-player gaming had been viewed by the video game industry as peripheral to the future of gaming, with Electronic Arts vice president Frank Gibeau stating in 2012 that he had not approved one game to be developed as a single-player experience.

The question of the financial viability of single-player AAA games was raised following the closure of Visceral Games by Electronic Arts (EA) in October 2017. Visceral had been a studio that established itself on a strong narrative single-player focus with Dead Space, and had been working on a single-player, linear narrative Star Wars game at the time of the closure; EA announced following this that they would be taking the game in a different direction, specifically "a broader experience that allows for more variety and player agency". Many commentators felt that EA made the change as they did not have confidence that a studio with an AAA-scale budget could produce a viable single-player game based on the popular Star Wars franchise. Alongside this, as well as relatively poor sales of games in the year prior that were principally AAA single-player games (Resident Evil 7, Prey, Dishonored 2, and Deus Ex: Mankind Divided) against financially successful multiplayer games and those offer a games-as-a-service model (Overwatch, Destiny 2, and Star Wars Battlefront 2), were indicators to many that the single-player model for AAA was waning. Manveer Heir, who had left EA after finishing his gameplay design work for Mass Effect Andromeda, acknowledged that the culture within EA was against the development of single-player games, and with Visceral's closure, "that the linear single-player triple-A game at EA is dead for the time being". Bethesda on December 7, 2017, decided to collaborate with Lynda Carter to launch a Public Safety Announcement to save single-player gaming.

A few years later in 2021, EA was reported to have revived interest in single-player games, following the successful launch of Star Wars Jedi: Fallen Order in 2020. The company still planned on releasing live service games with multiplayer components, but started evaluating its IP catalog for more single-player titles to revive, such as a remake of the Dead Space franchise. Around the same time, head of Xbox Game Studios Phil Spencer said that they still see a place for narrative-driven single-player games even though the financial drivers of the market tended to be live service games. Spencer said that developing such games with AAA-scale budgets can be risky, but with availability of services like cloud gaming and subscription services, they can gauge audience reaction to these games early on and reduce the risk involved before releases.

== Game elements ==
As the narrative and conflict in single-player gameplay is created by a computer rather than a human opponent, single-player games are able to deliver certain gaming experiences that are typically absent—or de-emphasised—in multiplayer games.

=== Story ===
Badland 2 Single-player games rely more heavily on compelling stories to draw the player into the experience and to create a sense of investment. Humans are unpredictable, so human players - allies or enemies - cannot be relied upon to carry a narrative in a particular direction, and so multiplayer games tend not to focus heavily on a linear narrative. By contrast, many single-player games are built around a compelling story.

=== Characters ===
While a multiplayer game relies upon human-human interaction for its conflict, and often for its sense of camaraderie, a single-player game must build these things artificially. As such, single-player games require deeper characterisation of their non-player characters in order to create connections between the player and the sympathetic characters and to develop deeper antipathy towards the game's antagonists. This is typically true of role-playing games (RPGs), such as Dragon Quest and the Final Fantasy, which are primarily character-driven and have a different setting.

=== Exceptions ===
These game elements are not firm, fixed rules; single-player puzzle games such as Tetris or racing games focus squarely on gameplay.

== See also ==
- Massively multiplayer online game

== Bibliography ==
- Fullerton, Tracy (2014). Game Design Workshop: A Playcentric Approach to Creating Innovative Games (3 ed.). CRC Press. ISBN 978-1498785877.
- Mitra, Ananda (2010). Digital Games: Computers at Play. Infobase Publishing. pp. 24–39. ISBN 978-0816067862.
- Perron, Bernard; Wolf, Mark J.P. (2014). The Routledge Companion to Video Game Studies. Routledge. pp. 253–256. ISBN 978-1136290503.
