= Guava Lamp =

Defunct gay bar in Houston, Texas, U.S.

- Interactive map of Guava Lamp
- Address: 570 Waugh Dr Houston, TX 77019-2002; Houston, Texas; U.S.
- Coordinates: 29°45′35″N 95°23′56″W
- Type: Gay bar

Construction
- Closed: 2020

Website
- web.archive.org/*/https://www.guavalamphouston.com

Guava Lamp was a gay bar and nightclub in Neartown, Houston, in the U.S. state of Texas. It closed in 2020 after 22 years of operation.

The Pride Superstar, in which contestants sang for a prize, began at Guava Lamp.
