= Badlands (EP) =

EP by Bad Dreems
- Released: 19 July 2013
- Length: 17:21
- Label: Mirador
- Producer: Paul "Woody" Annison; Jack Farley; Johnny Mackay

Bad Dreems chronology
Badlands (2013)	Dogs at Bay (2015)

Singles from Badlands
- 1. "Chills" Released: January 2012; 2. "Caroline" Released: March 2012; 3. "Too Old" Released: July 2012; 4. "Tomorrow Mountain" Released: April 2013

Badlands is the debut extended play by Australian band Bad Dreems, released on 19 July 2013.

The EP comprises songs written throughout the history of the band. Cameron said "Chills" is the first song they ever wrote, whilst "Hoping for" is the most recent. The recording occurred over the space of a year in various recording sessions.

Guitarist Alex Cameron describes the album as "not an album where you really plan the vision and you sit down and map out ten songs and record them in one sitting – it's more of a collection of the singles that we put online, plus a few new songs."

The EP was released on vinyl in September 2020 for Record Store Day.

== Reception ==
Kathy Pollock from 4zzz wrote, "Badlands is a short, fast exploration of isolation, paranoia, and frustration" calling the band's sound as "undeniably Australian".

Patrick Emery from Beat Magazine felt "Bad/Dreems' six song EP Badlands has a veneer of pop elegance, and an abrasive underbelly that makes you think twice about hanging out in [Adelaide] too long".

== Track listing ==
All songs written and performed by Bad Dreems.

1. "Chills" – 2:32
2. "Hoping For" – 3:06
3. "Home Life" – 2:49
4. "Caroline" – 2:17
5. "Tomorrow Mountain" – 3:50
6. "Too Old" – 2:47

== Release history ==
Release history and formats for Badlands
Region	Date	Format	Label	Catalogue
Various	19 July 2013	CD; digital	Mirador	MIRAR005
Australia	26 September 2020	LP	Farmer & The Owl	FAT0026LP
