= Badlands (role-playing game) =

Badlands is a 1991 role-playing game published by Cutting Edge Games.

== Gamplay ==
Badlands is a game in which player characters are members of monstrous races.

== Reception ==
Keith H. Eisenbeis reviewed Badlands in White Wolf #35 (March/April, 1993), rating it a 3 out of 5 and stated that "Compared to the many detailed roleplaying systems on the market today, this game system is extremely simplistic; however, the ideas presented therein are of value to those interested in its unique concept. This game may well appeal to those wishing for a change of pace or those who feel constrained by a strict, clear-cut good and evil setting. Moreover, the races and especially the Badlands setting itself could be incorporated into an existing campaign offering the possibility for many unique adventures."
