= Badlands (San Francisco) =

Gay bar and nightclub in San Francisco, California, U.S.

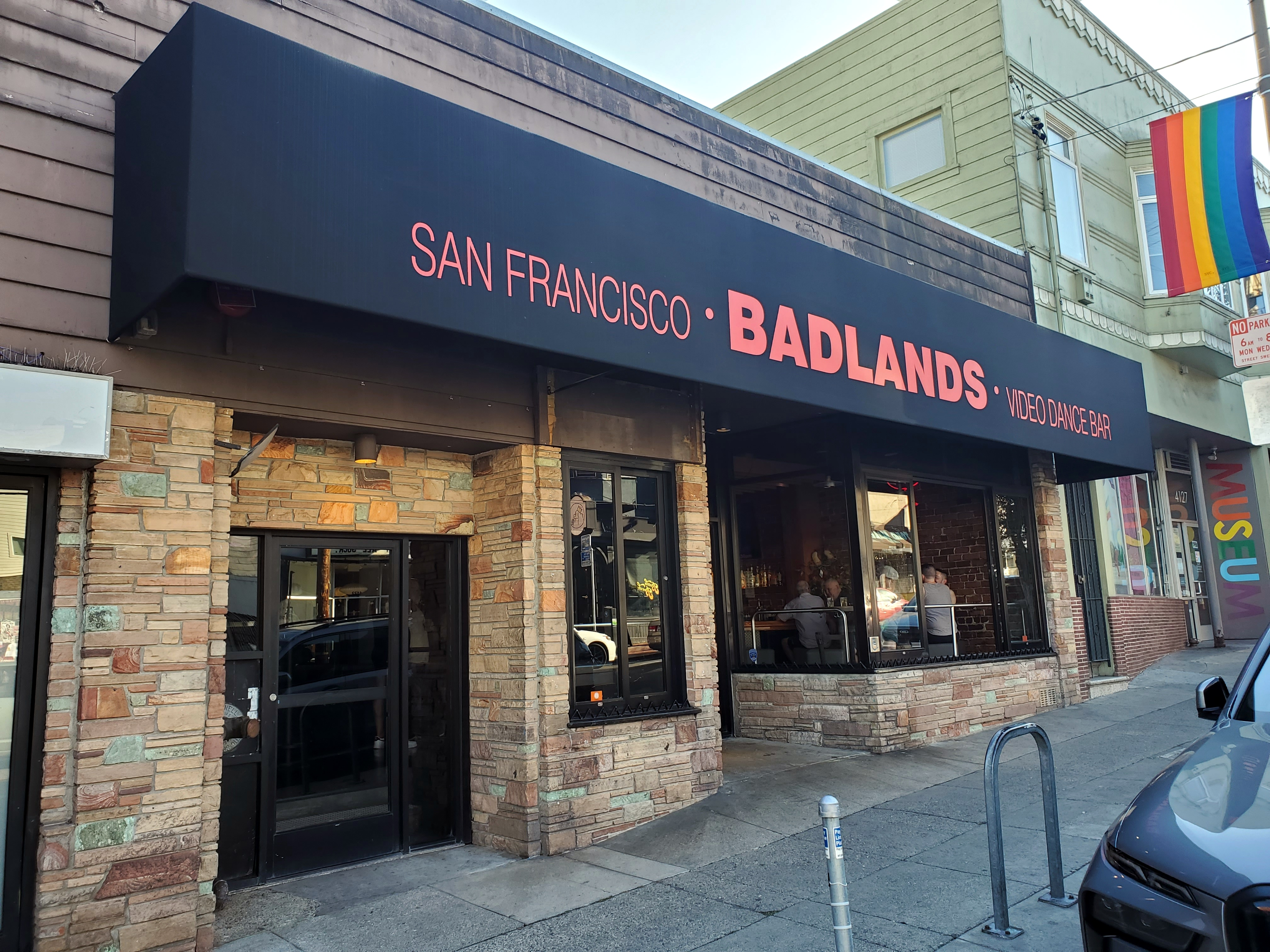
- Badlands shortly after reopening in October 2023
- Interactive map of Badlands
- Address: 4121 18th Street
- Location: San Francisco, California, U.S.
- Coordinates: 37.760740°N 122.435477°W
- Type: Gay bar; nightclub

Construction
- Opened: 1975; October 2023
- Closed: July 2020

Website
- sfbadlands.com

Badlands (sometimes Badlands San Francisco, Badlands SF, or San Francisco Badlands) is a gay bar and nightclub in San Francisco's Castro District, in the U.S. state of California. The bar opened in 1975 and closed in July 2020. It reopened in October 2023.

== Description ==
According to the San Francisco Chronicle, "Most nights attract a healthy crowd to the dance floor, where Britney, Gaga and Madonna rule the playlists." The bar describes itself as "[the Castro's] most popular location for video/music entertainment and dancing.".

== History ==
The bar opened in 1973 as the Watergate West, becoming Badlands in 1975. It was purchased by entrepreneur Les Natali in 1999.

In April 2005, the San Francisco Human Rights Commission investigated claims that the bar discriminated against African American customers and job seekers, finding 13 of 32 complaints to be valid The bar was at risk of losing its liquor license as a result, but the Castro Department of Alcoholic Beverage Control (ABC) found insufficient evidence and the case was closed. The bar was included in Business Insider's 2013 list of "The 10 Best Gay Bars in San Francisco".

== See also ==
- Impact of the COVID-19 pandemic on the LGBTQ community
