= The Shiny Brights =

Indie rock band from Australia

- Origin: Adelaide, South Australia, Australia
- Genres: Rock, Indie, Punk
- Years active: 2008 - present
- Labels: Independent
- Members: Wolfgang Marwe (vocals); James Bartold (guitar); Alex "Rego" Rajkowski (guitar); Chris Plummer (bass); Miles "Buns" Wilson (drums)

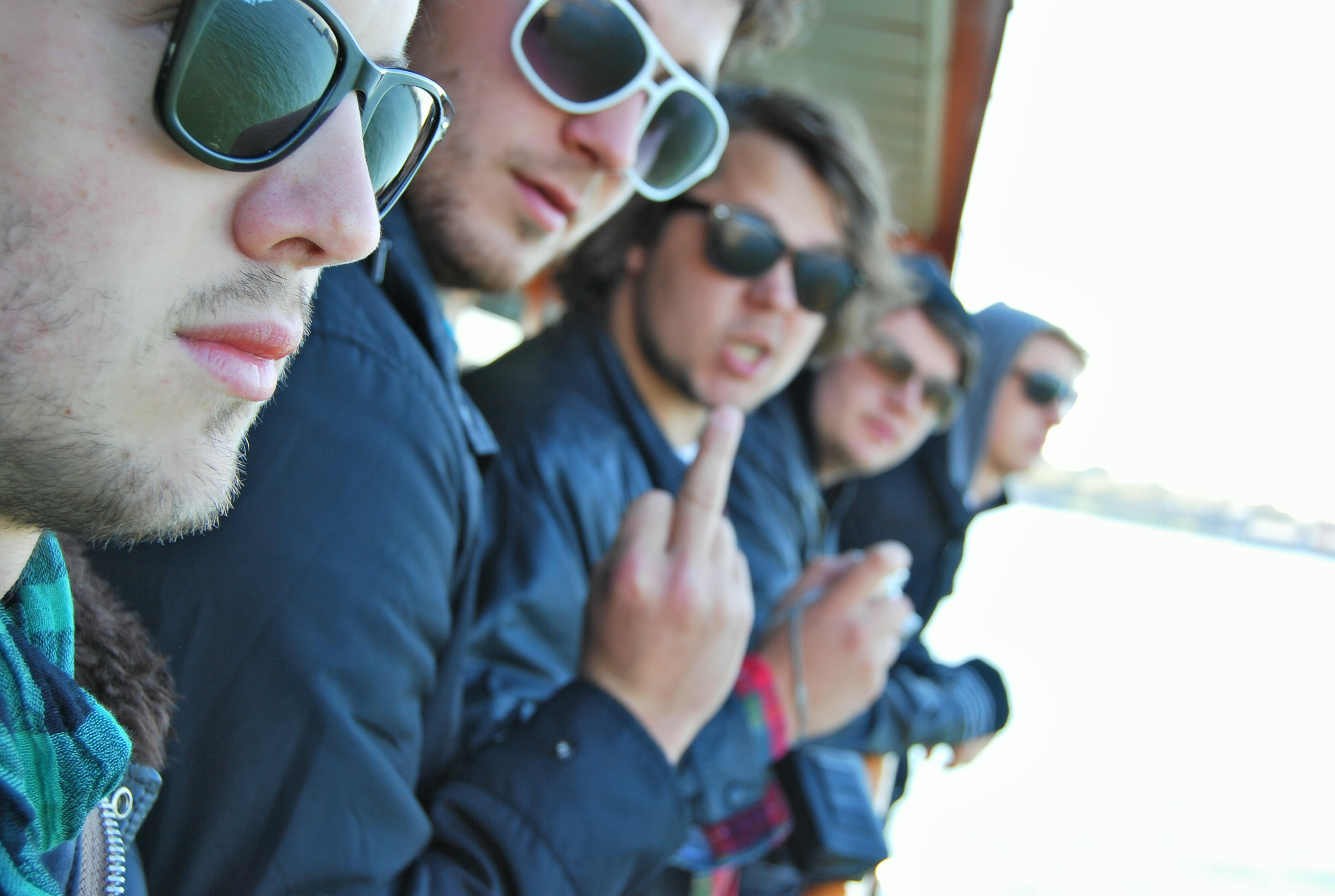
The band in New York

The Shiny Brights are an indie rock band from Adelaide, Australia. The five members have varied tastes in music that all influence their songs; a mix of post-punk, Brit pop and garage rock, held together by lead singer Wolfgang's distinctive voice and the band's four-part gang vocals. They rehearse in a warehouse full of washing machines which inspired the band name, derived from a laundromat franchise in Adelaide called Shiny Brights.

== Members ==
- Wolfgang Marwe - vocals, percussion
- James Bartold – guitar, backing vocals
- Alex "Rego" Rajkowski – guitar, backing vocals
- Chris Plummer - bass guitar, backing vocals
- Miles "Buns" Wilson - drums

== History ==
Wolfgang, James, Chris and Miles all met at high school and formed The Shiny Brights in late 2007, later recruiting Alex to play lead guitar and to take on the duties of driving the tour van.

In September 2008 they digitally released their debut 6-track EP Let's Not And Say We Did and launched it at the renowned Adelaide live music venue The Governor Hindmarsh Hotel. The single "Electric Tigerland" was added to Triple J, Nova and community radio stations around Australia. Let's Not And Say We Did was produced by Chris Doherty at Studios 301 in Sydney and mastered by Oscar Gaona. On the back of this release the band were invited to play at the CMJ Music Marathon in New York, the Parklife Festival, and the Adelaide International Guitar Festival. The band are currently working on their new EP 'Too Many Chiefs' which will be released in early 2010.

The band were selected to support UK act The Wombats as well as supporting Apollo Heights, John Steel Singers and The Vines. In the month of December 2008 they experienced a landslide of band competition wins that put them in the spotlight; they were 'unearthed' by Australian youth radio network Triple J to play at the Big Day Out headlined by acts like Neil Young, Arctic Monkeys, My Morning Jacket, The Prodigy, then they won a Sonicbids competition to play at Southbound Festival in Western Australia, alongside The Hives, Franz Ferdinand, The Kooks, Gomez amongst others, and they also won a Nova Radio competition to play at the Clipsal 500 After Race Concert with The Living End, Gyroscope and The Butterfly Effect. They were named as one of Rip It Up Magazine's 'Hot Six Local Picks for 2009'.
