= Badland 2 =

2015 video game

- App Store icon
- Developer: Frogmind Games
- Publisher: Cheetah Games
- Series: Badland
- Platforms: iOS, Android
- Release: iOS; 17 December 2015; Android; 8 September 2016
- Genre: Puzzle
- Mode: Single-player

Badland 2 (stylized BADLAND 2) is a mobile video game designed by Frogmind Games and released on the iOS and Android platforms. The game was released in December 2015 on iOS and in September 2016 on Android. It is the sequel to Badland.

== Development ==
The game was unveiled by Juhana Myllys, the co-founder and lead designer of the Frogmind Games, who said that the game was the company's attempt to reinvent the first Badland, where they wanted the game to be worthy of the word sequel.

== Gameplay ==
Similar to the first game, the player flies around a little black creature through the woods of the game. Beginning in Day 1 Dawn, the game progresses through four stages (Dawn, Noon, Dusk, and Night), each with a separate color scheme and new theme of traps, but unlike in the first game, the game features new tactics such as flying in both directions, new obstacles such as water, liquids, flamethrower, frost, magma and searing light. The game also features a new mode which makes the creature into a rolling wheel. The game also offers standalone challenges stages for the player to compete against their friends via the online leaderboard. The new version of game also included 3 different modes: survive the longest, save the most clones or reach the end fastest.

== Reception ==
Reception

Aggregate score
| Aggregator | Score |
|---|---|
| Metacritic | 91/100 |

Review scores
| Publication | Score |
|---|---|
| Game Informer | 8.25/10 |
| TouchArcade | 100/100, 5 stars |

Badland 2 received positive reviews from critics, ending up with a Metacritic score of 91. Nathan Reinauer, writing for TouchArcade praised the sequel's updated controls and new mechanics. Game Informer's Matt Miller enjoyed the gameplay and visuals of the game, but criticized the slow pacing of some of the puzzles.
