= PASSOP =

Non profit organisation in South Africa

People Against Suffering, Oppression and Poverty (PASSOP) is a community-based, grass roots non-profit organisation fighting for the rights of asylum seekers, refugees and immigrants in Cape Town, South Africa.

PASSOP offers a range of services including: help desks that offer paralegal advice, integration events and workshops, a Disabled Children Support Project, an African Solidarity Education Project, assistance with documentation issues, ZDP Permits and Appeals, monitoring of Internally Displaced Persons camps and other advocacy and education projects.

== Founding ==
PASSOP was founded in 2007 by a group of Zimbabweans and spearheaded by Braam Hanekom. Though originally established in response to increased tensions between Zimbabwean foreign nationals fleeing Robert Mugabe's increasingly repressive regime and South African citizens who blamed them for crime and unemployment. PASSOP has since become a leading advocate for refugees and immigrants to demand human rights in South Africa. Staffed by volunteers and funded primarily through donations, PASSOP has had a large impact on the debate around the situation of documented and undocumented immigrants in South Africa, vowing to be a "voice for the voiceless". Passop is an Afrikaans word meaning beware. PASSOP is unique amongst other South African non-profit organisations in that it is an advocacy and activist organisation that draws the majority of its members and volunteers from the refugee community.

== History ==
By identifying and exposing corruption within the Home Affairs Department's Refugee Reception Centre, PASSOP has helped to increase the number of asylum seekers being served each day (from around 20 before the creation of PASSOP to now over 200). Through protest action, PASSOP has brought the issues of corruption and xenophobia to the public eye.

In November 2007, PASSOP set the tone for its protest activism in its advocacy for the refugees who were forced to wait in massive queues outside of Cape Town's Department of Home Affairs Refugee Center. At that time, the Department of Home Affairs processed only 20 asylum applications daily, while 600 to 2,000 refugees camped outside the department in a queue circling the block. Many foreign nationals waited in the queue for weeks; one, Adonis Musati, starved to death while waiting to receive asylum documents that he was entitled to by law.

Following this death, PASSOP lodged a complaint with the South African Human Rights Commission (SAHRC) and raised funds to repatriate Musati's body to Zimbabwe. PASSOP members also staged several protests at the Refugee Center and lobbied the Parliament on behalf of those refugees still waiting in the queue. As a direct result, Cape Town's Department of Home Affairs now services between 180 and 300 applications daily.

== Xenophobia and PASSOP ==
There are a large number of immigrants living in South Africa, estimates varying between one and three million. Massive documentation backlogs, poor queue management, corruption, and a general lack of resources at the Refugee Reception Centres across South Africa, coupled with an incoherent immigration policy in general has led to a situation in which most of immigrants in South Africa are undocumented. It is these undocumented immigrants, asylum seekers and refugees that are the most vulnerable, most marginalised section of South Africa's population.

This group of undocumented immigrants is acutely under-represented in labour unions, civil society and community activism efforts, and not represented at all politically. This lack of representation leaves them with compromised access to education, health care, labour rights, shelter, and even the most basic human rights. They are among the most easily and widely exploited individuals in South Africa, and are often made the victims of targeted hate crimes and xenophobic aggression. In 2008, more than 60 immigrants were killed and over 30,000 people were forcefully displaced as a result of xenophobic attacks throughout South Africa. In 2009, the attacks were repeated and over 3,000 people were displaced in the Western Cape alone. PASSOP fights for the rights of this acutely marginalised group of people.

For example, following xenophobic attacks in several informal settlements in the Western Cape and Gauteng in May and June 2008, PASSOP was a vocal member of the Civil Society Task Team, set up by the SAHRC in response to the massive influx of foreign nationals into refugee camps. PASSOP worked closely with both South Africans and foreign nationals to negotiate the refugees' peaceful reintegration into their communities. PASSOP remains a forum in which refugees can speak out about the conditions in which they now live in South Africa. PASSOP works closely with community leaders in the Zimbabwean, Congolese and Somali community structures to address issues, concerns and problems facing refugees and immigrants within Cape Town. In this, PASSOP especially advocates for undocumented immigrants who often have no civil representation.

PASSOP collaborates with students and has many student volunteers from the University of Cape Town who assist and support it in many of its day-to-day functions. Moreover, PASSOP is the beneficiary of the annual Cape Town Zimfest Music festival, first held in the Good Hope centre, Cape Town on 6 September 2008. The musical event features performers including Freshlyground, The Rudimentals, The Dirty Skirts, Ike Moriz, New Altum, Tristan Waterkeyn and Coda.

PASSOP maintains that definitions of refugees and asylum seekers need to be reformulated to take into account breadline refugees. The situation in Zimbabwe is so appalling that people must choose between leaving their homes in search of a means of survival or remaining at home to starve. The economic condition in Zimbabwe is so extreme it constitutes a humanitarian crisis. People in Zimbabwe are so destitute that many are below the breadline, meaning they cannot even afford basic food and are therefore driven out of their own country, seeking subsistence survival in South Africa and other Southern African nations. PASSOP wants to make the South African public aware of the lack of choice people have in their decisions to cross the border. PASSOP is against all xenophobic attacks on immigrants and maintains that the right to freedom and dignity is one of all persons residing in South Africa, whether here legally or illegally. PASSOP has made their disappointment with South African foreign policy known through the media and public protests. PASSOP continues to demand immediate improvement in the services provided to refugees and asylum seekers by the Department of Home Affairs.

== Gallery ==
logo

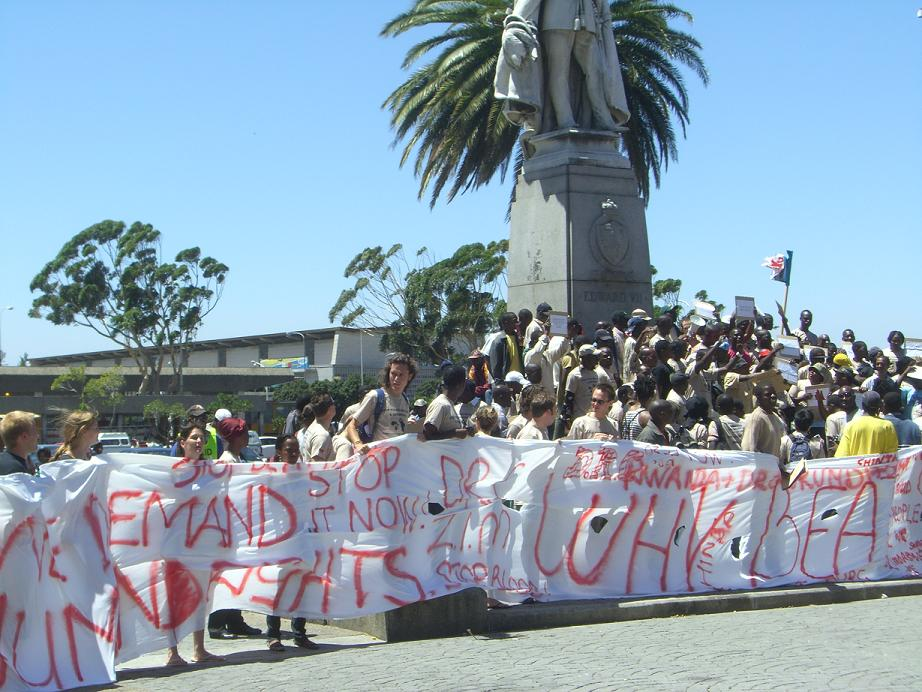
A protest against police brutality and xenophobia Feb 2007

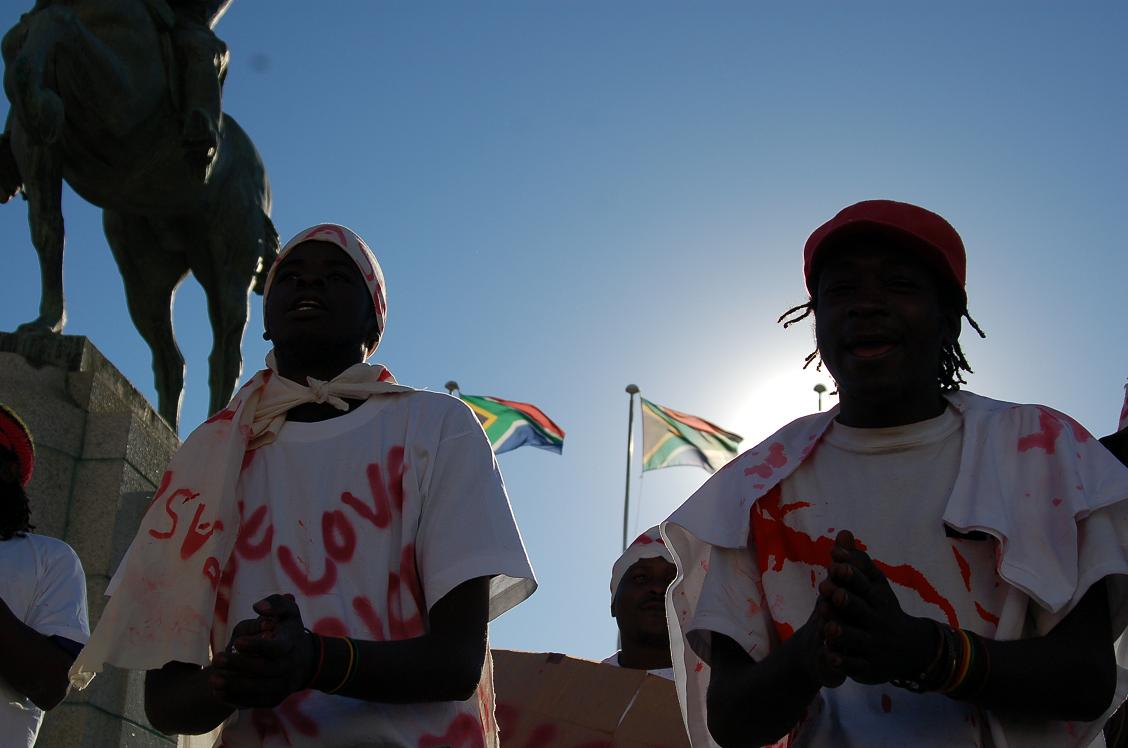
A protest outside of the South African Parliament
