= Manvendra Singh Gohil =

Hereditary Prince of Rajpipla

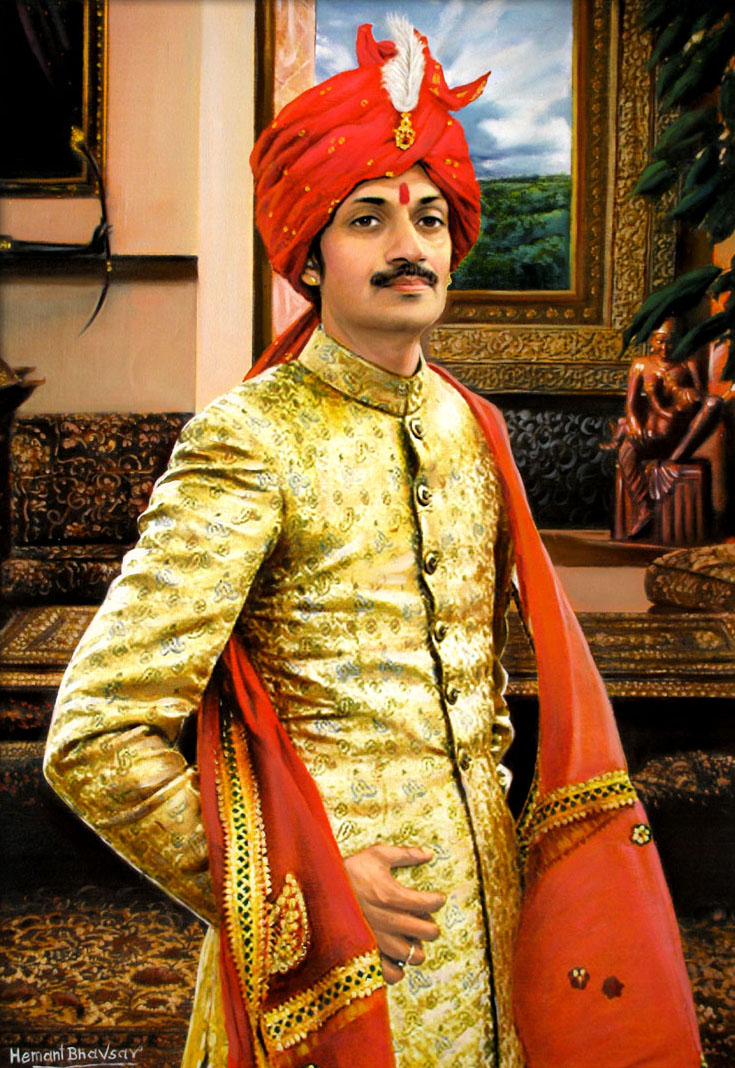
- Born: 23 September 1965 (age 60); Ajmer, Ajmer district, Rajasthan, India
- Spouse: Chandrika Kumari of Jhabua (m. 1991; div. 1992) Cecil DeAndre Richardson (m. 2013)
Names
- Manvendra Kumar Singh Gohil
- House: Gohil dynasty
- Father: Maharana Rajendrasinghji of Rajpipla
- Mother: Rukmini Devi of Jaisalmer
- Religion: Hinduism

Manvendra Singh Gohil (born 23 September 1965) is a son and probable heir of former Maharaja of Rajpipla. He is considered to be the first openly gay prince in the world, and he is known for being one of India's foremost LGBT activists. He is the Managing Director and Co-founder of Search Ends Inclusion Impact, an initiative driving transformative change through inclusive practices. He runs a charity, the Lakshya Trust, which works with the LGBT community.

== Biography ==
He was born in Ajmer, the only son of Maharana Raghubir Singhji Rajendrasinghji Sahib, Maharana of Rajpipla, and his wife, Maharani Rukmini Devi.

In 1971, the government of India "de-recognized" the Indian princes, and Manvendra's father lost the official title of Maharaja and the privy purse (an annual pension) that came with it. The princes adjusted to the new regime; the Rajpipla royals converted their family seat, the Rajvant Palace in Rajpipla, into a tourist resort and location for film-shooting. They also set up a second residence in Mumbai. He was educated at Bombay Scottish School and at the Amrutben Jivanlal College of Commerce and Economics (one of the institutions in the Mithibai College campus in Vile Parle, Mumbai).

His parents entered him into an arranged marriage, and in January 1991, he wed Chandrika Kumari of Jhabua State in Madhya Pradesh.

The marriage remained unconsummated. He says, "It was a total disaster. A total failure. The marriage never got consummated. I realized I had done something very wrong. Now two people were suffering instead of one. Far from becoming normal, my life was more miserable."

His wife filed for divorce after just over a year of marriage. She said in a letter, “I am returning in the same state as I came” and thus confirmed that the marriage was never consummated. Although further requests for marriage were received, he declined them. He suffered a nervous breakdown in 2002.

Upon being informed by psychiatrists that their son was gay, Manvendra's parents accepted the truth, but stipulated that this matter should not be revealed to anyone else. He left Mumbai and began living full-time with his parents in the small town of Rajpipla.

In 2005, Chirantana Bhatt, a young journalist from Vadodara approached Manvendra. He confided his sexual orientation and the mental stress he was going through as a closeted gay man to the journalist. On 14 March 2006, the story of his coming out made headlines. The "coming out" story was first published in the Vadodara edition of Divya Bhaskar, a regional Gujarati language daily of the Bhaskar media group. It was covered the next day in all other editions of Bhaskar groups language newspapers like Dainik Bhaskar (Hindi language) and Daily News Analysis (DNA), an English newspaper. Soon the news appeared in other English and vernacular newspapers across the country, and became a story that they followed up in their gossip and society pages for several weeks afterward. The people of Rajpipla were shocked: Manvendra was burnt in effigy and publicly jeered and heckled. His family accused him of bringing dishonor and disowned him soon after.

He appeared as a guest on The Oprah Winfrey Show on 24 October 2007. He was one of three persons featured in the show entitled 'Gay Around the World'. He inaugurated the Euro Pride gay festival in Stockholm, Sweden, on 25 July 2008.

He featured in a BBC Television series, Undercover Princes, screened on BBC Three in the UK in January 2009 which documented his search for a British boyfriend in Brighton.

Since July 2010, he has served as editor of the gay male-centric print magazine Fun, which is published in Rajpipla. In July 2013, Manvendra married an American man named Cecil "DeAndre" Richardson (né Hilton), a Macy's cosmetics employee for Origins, hailing from Albany, Oregon, and living in Seattle.

In January 2021, the false news of him, along with 50 members of the transgender community, joining the Bharatiya Janata Party was circulated.

== Charitable activities ==
In 2000, he started the Lakshya Trust, of which he is chairman, a group dedicated to HIV/AIDS education and prevention, LGBTQ+ issues and running of India's first gay ashram. A registered public charitable trust, Lakshya is a community-based organisation working for HIV/AIDS prevention among men who have sex with men (MSMs). It provides counselling services, clinics for treatment of sexually transmitted infections, libraries, and condom-use promotion. The trust also trains female field workers who educate women married to MSM about safe sex practices. Lakshya won the Civil Society Award 2006 for its contribution in preventing HIV/AIDS among homosexual men.

The trust also creates employment opportunities for gay men and support for other organisations for MSMs, and plans to open a hospice/old age home for gay men.

Lakshya is a member of the India Network For Sexual Minorities (INFOSEM) and a founding member of the Sexual Health Action Network (SHAN).

In 2007, Manvendra joined the Interim Governing Board of the Asia Pacific Coalition on Male Sexual Health, known as APCOM, a regional coalition of MSM and HIV community-based organisations, the government sector, donors, technical experts and the UN system. He serves as India Community Representative on behalf of INFOSEM, the India MSM and HIV network. Manvendra said of this work, "APCOM is one of the best mediums to bring together different nationalities and develop linkages with others working for HIV and MSM/TG. In India, it will be an important tool to influence authorities to change thinking and broaden outlooks for the betterment of society. APCOM demonstrates the essence of unity and solidarity within diversity."

In January 2008, while performing an annual ceremony in Rajpipla in honour of his great-grandfather Maharaja Vijaysinhji, Manvendra Gohil announced plans to adopt a child, saying: "I have carried out all my responsibilities as the prince so far and will continue as long as I can. I will also adopt a child soon so that all traditions continue". If the adoption proceeds, it will be the first known case of a single gay man adopting a child in India.

In 2018, Manvendra opened up his 15-acre palace grounds to help house vulnerable LGBT people who might otherwise be "left with nothing" when "their families disown them after coming out".

== In popular culture ==
Manvendra Singh Gohil appeared as a guest in three episodes of The Oprah Winfrey Show, as part of the segment called Gays Around the World in 2011, he appeared twice again in 2014 and 2017.

In 2017, he was a special guest in an episode of Keeping Up with the Kardashians titled "India’s first openly gay prince, Manvendra Singh Gohil".

Manvendra was also featured in Cheryl Allison's 2021 documentary Pieces of Us, which profiles people who have experienced anti-LGBTQ hate.
