= Arrows (Australian band) =

Australian emo band

- Origin: Brisbane, Queensland, Australia
- Genres: Indie, emo
- Years active: 2006–2015
- Label: Hobbledehoy Record Co
- Members: Anthony Morgan; Carl Burnett; Anders Cairns; Scott Merillo
- Website: http://www.arrowsmusic.net

Arrows are an Australian band from Brisbane, Queensland, formed in August 2006. The band has released two albums, an EP and two split releases. The line-up consists of Anthony Morgan (guitars, keyboard, vocals), Carl Burnett (bass) Anders Cairns (drums) and Scott Merillo (guitar).

Arrows are on the Hobbledehoy Record Co label, an independent Australian record company that also features Owen, Blueline Medic, This Will Destroy You, Eleventh He Reaches London, Caspian and more.

== Don't Write Poetry ==
In Spring of 2006, Arrows self recorded their debut EP Don't Write Poetry under Burnett's Indoor Children label as a limited release.

The release is titled after and features excerpts from various Charles Bukowski works.

Track listing

1. Untitled
2. Don't Bullshit a Bullshitter
3. The Next Sound You Hear
4. Sleep? I Do Not, Miss
5. My Verses Versus Your Lyrics
6. 10 August 2006
7. Clever

== Split 12" – These Hands Could Separate the Sky ==
After touring with These Hands Could Separate the Sky, the two bands recorded a split 12" record which was originally released in October 2007 by Indoor Children, later to be re-released on CDep / digital by Hobbledehoy Record Co.

Track listing

Arrows

1. Let the Marketing Onslaught Begin
2. You Can Take the Neighbourhood Out of the Boy (But You Can't Take the Boy Out of the Neighbourhood)
3. Don't Interrupt me While I'm Working

These Hands Could Separate the Sky

4. Sedna
5. Sirens (Good Morning Captain)

== Modern Art & Politics ==
In November 2008, Hobbledehoy Record Co released the band's debut full-length Modern Art & Politics. Recorded by David Williams and the band themselves at Via Studios and in various apartments across Brisbane, it was later mixed by Samuel Johnson and mastered by Doug van Sloun (Bright Eyes, Cursive, The Gloria Record), the record flooded "Best of 2008" lists and received praising reviews from all across the world.

In July 2012, the song Whores Will Have Their Trinkets from Modern Art & Politics was used in the Parkway Drive Home is for the Heartless DVD. Debuting at #1 on the ARIA Music DVD charts and reaching Gold status in its first week of sales, the DVD would go on to reach Platinum status shortly after.

Track listing

1. We Only Speak on Weekends
2. Whores Will Have Their Trinkets
3. Someone You Knew But You've Hardly Met
4. Clean Sheets Aren't Just For Keepers
5. Surely Not? Afraid So
6. I Can Hear Your Lungs Rattling
7. She Wore a Cabernet Smile
8. Some Novel I'm Writing
9. May Your Beer and Chin Always Be Held High
10. Pour Me into a Taxi

== Try & Stay Upright ==
Winter of 2010 saw the band record Try & Stay Upright, again using the familiar faces of David Williams, Samuel Johnson and Doug van Sloun for its recording, mixing and mastering respectively. The record was released on multiple formats on Hobbledehoy Record Co 20 September 2010.

The record was again met with positive reviews across Australia and worldwide.

Track listing

1. What Happens at a Gifthorse Show
2. Calling Your Sponsor
3. Try and Stay Upright
4. Always With the Leaving
5. Of Bordeaux and Burgundy
6. No Prizes for Pioneering

== Split 7" – Empire! Empire! ==
Released on 4 September 2012 with North American friends Empire! Empire! (I Was a Lonely Estate) as a collaboration between the band's respective longtime labels Hobbledehoy Record Co and Count Your Lucky Stars Records, this was the fifth release for Arrows. This Split 7" was a long time coming after years of contact between the two bands.

The artwork features Bodhi Thomas, family pet of a close friend to Arrows.

Track listing

Arrows

1. All Passwords Are Brisbane

Empire! Empire! (I Was a Lonely Estate)

4. Turbo Stasis
5. We Did Not Need to Open It to Know It Was There

== Disbandment ==
After announcing their break-up some years earlier, Arrows again regrouped to join emo heavyweights Mineral on their national Australian Tour. This run of shows has proven to be their last.
