= Soundwave (Australian music festival) =

Australian music festival

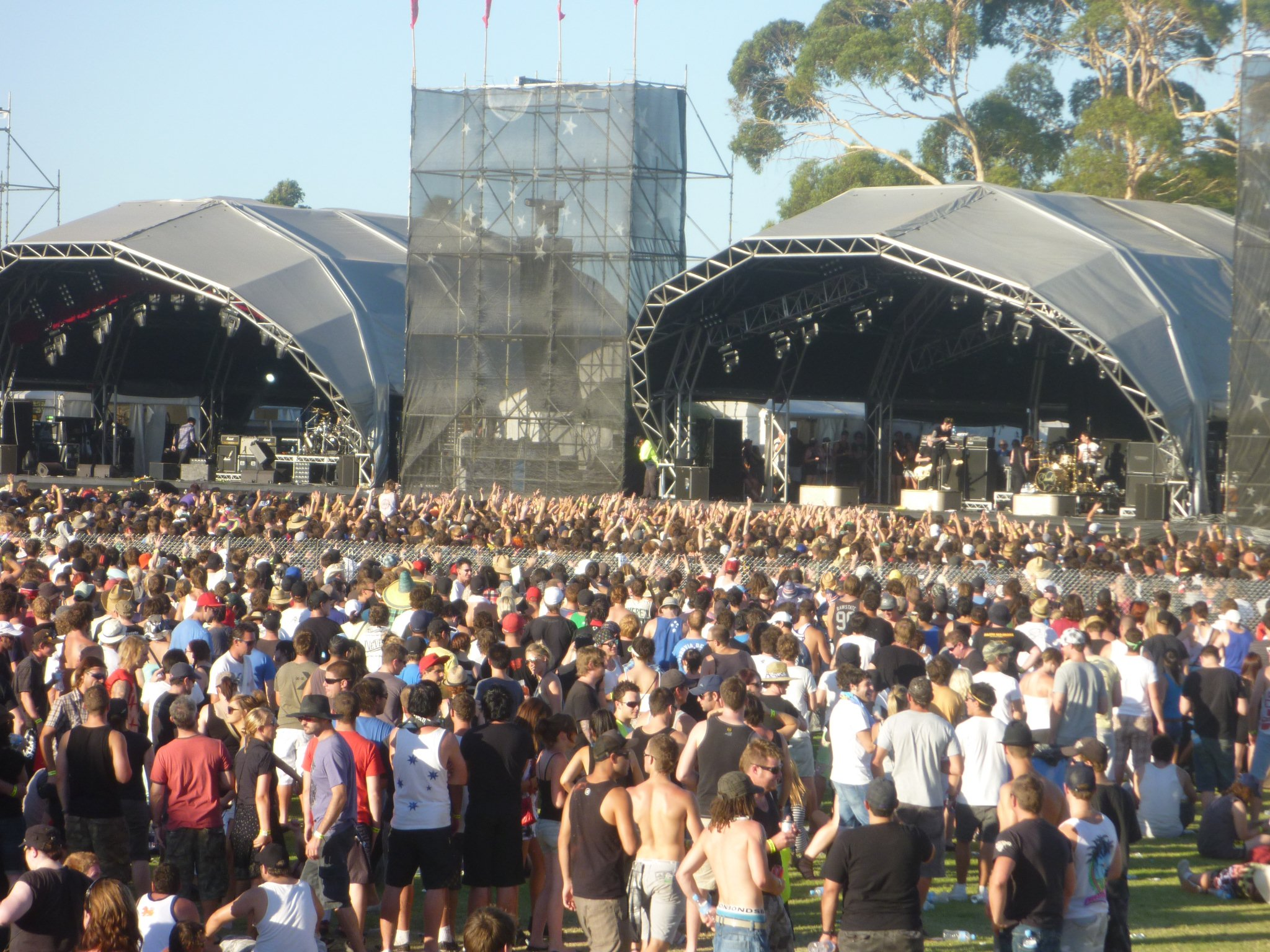
- AFI playing on the main stage at Soundwave Perth 2010
- Genre: Heavy metal; metalcore; alternative metal; alternative rock; punk rock; pop punk
- Dates: mid-February – early March; late January
- Locations: Australia; Perth (2004–2014); Brisbane (2007–2015); Sydney (2007–2015); Melbourne (2008–2015); Adelaide (2008–2015)
- Years active: 2004–2015
- Founders: AJ Maddah
- Website: soundwavefestival.com

Soundwave was an annual music festival held in major cities around Australia, run and promoted by Soundwave Touring. The festival originated in Perth, Western Australia, and began travelling to the other Australian capital cities in 2007. It featured a number of international and Australian music acts from various genres, including rock, metal and punk. The festival has been headlined by Deftones, the Offspring, Incubus, Alice in Chains, Bloodhound Gang, Nine Inch Nails, Faith No More, Jimmy Eat World, Jane's Addiction, Soundgarden, Iron Maiden, Queens of the Stone Age, the Smashing Pumpkins, System of a Down, Slipknot, Green Day, Avenged Sevenfold, Linkin Park, Blink-182 and Metallica.

Soundwave Festival occurred annually until 2015. A 2016 iteration of the festival was planned, but its cancellation was announced on 17 December 2015 by founder AJ Maddah due to poor ticket sales.

== History ==
The Soundwave festival originated in Perth, as a smaller festival known as Gravity Soundwave within the Gravity Games. The Gravity Games were held in South Perth along the Swan River, being based mainly on water-based and action sports. The event was sponsored by Vodafone in its first year, with the company reportedly committing one million dollars to the event. Gravity Soundwave provided the music side of the festival, which took place at McCallum Park alongside the Swan River.

Gravity Soundwave was first introduced in the festival's first year, which was held on 14 and 15 October 2004. American pop punk band Good Charlotte effectively became the first headline act of Soundwave, when they performed in the festival's first night along with Gyroscope and One Dollar Short. The following night featured Unwritten Law, Regurgitator, MxPx, Lagwagon and Last Year's Hero.

The 2005 festival was again presented by Vodafone, being held on the night of 8 October. Gravity Soundwave was headlined by Grinspoon, and also featured American acts Unwritten Law, Reel Big Fish, and Goldfinger.

The third and final year of the Gravity Games festival in Perth was moved to December 2006, instead of October. Gravity Soundwave featured American act Aiden, local Australian bands Gyroscope, Kisschasy, Parkway Drive, The Getaway Plan and New Zealanders Goodnight Nurse.

== 2007 ==
2007 logo

In 2007 the festival expanded to include Sydney and Brisbane, and increased the number of bands performing. A number of the artists featured in the 2007 Festival had previously played at the Soundwave Festival in Perth, including Unwritten Law, MxPx and Parkway Drive.

=== Locations ===
- Riverstage, Brisbane, 24 February 2007
- Sydney Park, Sydney, 25 February 2007
- Robinson Pavilion, Perth, 3 March 2007

=== Lineup ===
- Deftones (USA)
- +44 (USA)
- As Tall as Lions (USA)^{[B]}
- Unwritten Law (USA)
- Thrice (USA)
- MxPx (USA)
- Suicidal Tendencies (USA)
- Hatebreed (USA)
- Juliette and the Licks (USA)
- The Bronx (USA)
- Eighteen Visions (USA)
- Parkway Drive^{[A]}
- Something with Numbers
- Flyleaf (USA)
- Terror (USA)
- Behind Crimson Eyes
- Houston Calls (USA)
- Trial Kennedy
- Forgive Durden (USA)
- Hit the Lights (USA)
- Drive By (USA)
- Blindspott (NZ)

=== Local acts ===
Brisbane

- Doctor Octopus
- The Disables
- Say Nothing

Sydney

- Angelas Dish
- Regular John
- Fifty Sixx

Perth

- Stars Don't Fall
- Calerway
- Avalore

Notes

*A Parkway Drive did not appear in Perth
*B As Tall as Lions replaced The Format

== 2008 ==
The Dear Hunter vocalist Casey Crescenzo performing at Soundwave in Melbourne 2008.

The 2008 Soundwave festival was headlined by The Offspring, along with Incubus and Killswitch Engage and was expanded to include dates in Melbourne and Adelaide, increasing the number of dates from three to five. The expanded Festival featured five stages compared to three the previous year.

=== Locations ===
- Riverstage and Parklands, Brisbane, 23 February 2008
- Sydney Park, Sydney, 24 February 2008
- Melbourne Showgrounds, Melbourne, 29 February 2008
- Bonython Park, Adelaide, 1 March 2008
- Steel Blue Oval, Perth, 3 March 2008

=== Lineup ===
- The Offspring (USA)
- Incubus (USA)
- Killswitch Engage (USA)
- Alexisonfire (CAN) ^{[A]}
- Thursday (USA) ^{[B]}
- Infectious Grooves (USA)^{[C]}
- Plain White T's (USA)
- Motion City Soundtrack (USA)
- Sugarcult (USA)
- Saosin (USA)
- Mindless Self Indulgence (USA)
- As I Lay Dying (USA)
- From Autumn to Ashes (USA) ^{[D]}
- The Starting Line (USA)
- The Fall of Troy (USA)
- Shadows Fall (USA)
- Boys Like Girls (USA)
- Bleeding Through (USA)
- Halifax (USA)
- Scary Kids Scaring Kids (USA)
- mewithoutYou (USA)
- The Matches (USA)
- The Receiving End of Sirens (USA)
- Haste the Day (USA)
- All Time Low (USA)
- Mae (USA)
- Still Remains (USA) ^{[D]}
- As Tall as Lions (USA)
- City and Colour (CAN) ^{[E]}
- Cartel (USA)
- Madina Lake (USA)
- Kevin Devine (USA)
- Socratic (USA)
- Envy on the Coast (USA)
- The Dear Hunter (USA)
- My American Heart (USA)
- Divine Heresy (USA)
- Jim Ward (Sparta) (USA)
- Carpathian

=== Local acts ===
Brisbane

- The Amity Affliction
- Take 21
- The Gift Horse

Sydney

- Trial Kennedy

Melbourne

- Capeside
- Donnie Dureau (Blueline Medic)

Adelaide

- In Fiction
- City Riots

Perth

- Break Even
- Eleventh He Reaches London
- An Evening at Elmwood
- Anime Fire

Notes

*A Alexisonfire replaced Coheed and Cambria, who withdrew from the lineup to support Linkin Park on their US tour
*B Thursday replaced Chiodos, who also withdrew from the lineup to support Linkin Park on their US tour
*C Infectious Grooves replaced Social Distortion, who withdrew from the lineup for unspecified reasons
*D From Autumn to Ashes and Still Remains did not appear in Brisbane or Sydney
*E City and Colour replaced Ace Enders, who withdrew from the lineup for unspecified reasons

== 2009 ==
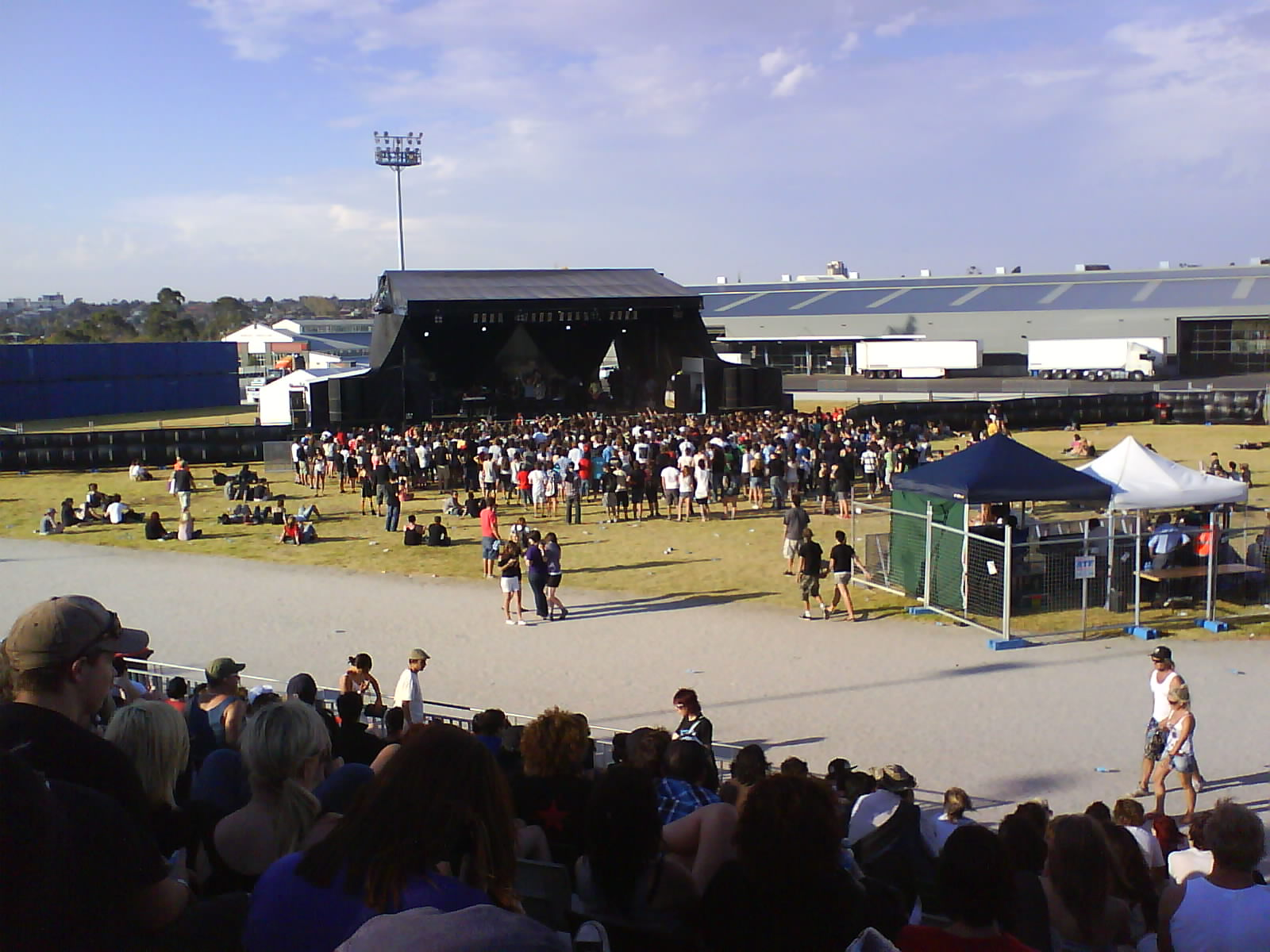
Chiodos performing on the introduced extra sixth stage at Soundwave in Melbourne, 2009.

The lineup for the 2009 festival was announced on 24 September 2008, the headliners were Nine Inch Nails and sub-headliners were Alice in Chains and Bloodhound Gang.

Presenters of British reality stunt TV show Dirty Sanchez and Finnish stuntmen The Dudesons were masters of ceremonies at Soundwave 2009.

This festival featured 55 acts across six stages.

=== Locations ===
- RNA Showgrounds, Brisbane, 21 February 2009
- Eastern Creek Raceway, Sydney, 22 February 2009
- Melbourne Showgrounds, Melbourne, 27 February 2009
- Bonython Park, Adelaide, 28 February 2009
- Steel Blue Oval, Perth, 2 March 2009

=== Lineup ===
- Nine Inch Nails (USA)
- Alice in Chains (USA)
- Bloodhound Gang (USA)
- The Dillinger Escape Plan (USA)^{[A]}
- ~~Scars on Broadway (USA)~~
- Rival Schools (USA)
- Lamb of God (USA)
- Finch (USA)
- Alkaline Trio (USA)
- Billy Talent (CAN)
- The Red Jumpsuit Apparatus (USA)
- Face to Face (USA)
- In Flames (SWE)
- Anberlin (USA)
- The Subways (UK)
- Every Time I Die (USA)
- DevilDriver (USA)
- Funeral for a Friend (UK)
- Less Than Jake (USA)^{[B]}
- Madina Lake (USA)
- New Found Glory (USA)
- From First to Last (USA)
- Bedouin Soundclash (CAN)
- Hellogoodbye (USA)
- Poison the Well (USA)
- Goldfinger (USA)
- Say Anything (USA)
- Unearth (USA)
- Bayside (USA)
- Chiodos (USA)
- Silverstein (CAN)
- Saves the Day (USA)
- Lacuna Coil (ITA)
- 36 Crazyfists (USA)
- Straylight Run (USA)
- Evergreen Terrace (USA)
- Minus the Bear (USA)
- Moneen (CAN)
- Ace Enders (The Early November) (USA)
- I Am the Avalanche (USA)
- Jaguar Love (USA)
- Emery (USA)
- Houston Calls (USA)
- The Audition (USA)
- Attack in Black (CAN)
- InnerPartySystem (USA)
- Valencia (USA)
- Alesana (USA)
- The Riverboat Gamblers (USA)
- Horse the Band (USA)
- Maylene and the Sons of Disaster (USA)
- Underoath (USA)
- Forever the Sickest Kids (USA)
- All that Remains (USA)
- Jack's Mannequin (USA)
- Mike Herrera (USA)^{[C]}
- International Superheroes of Hardcore (USA)^{[C]}

=== Local acts ===
Brisbane

- Forlorn Gaze
- The Amity Affliction

Sydney

- Mission in Motion
- Mary Jane Kelly

Melbourne

- Stealing O'Neal
- House Vs. Hurricane

Adelaide

- Double Dragon
- Isle of Capri

Perth

- Elora Danan

Notes

*A The Dillinger Escape Plan replaced Scars on Broadway
*B Less Than Jake did not appear in Brisbane due to flight delays.
*C Acts were made public in a third announcement and only appeared in Sydney.

== 2010 ==
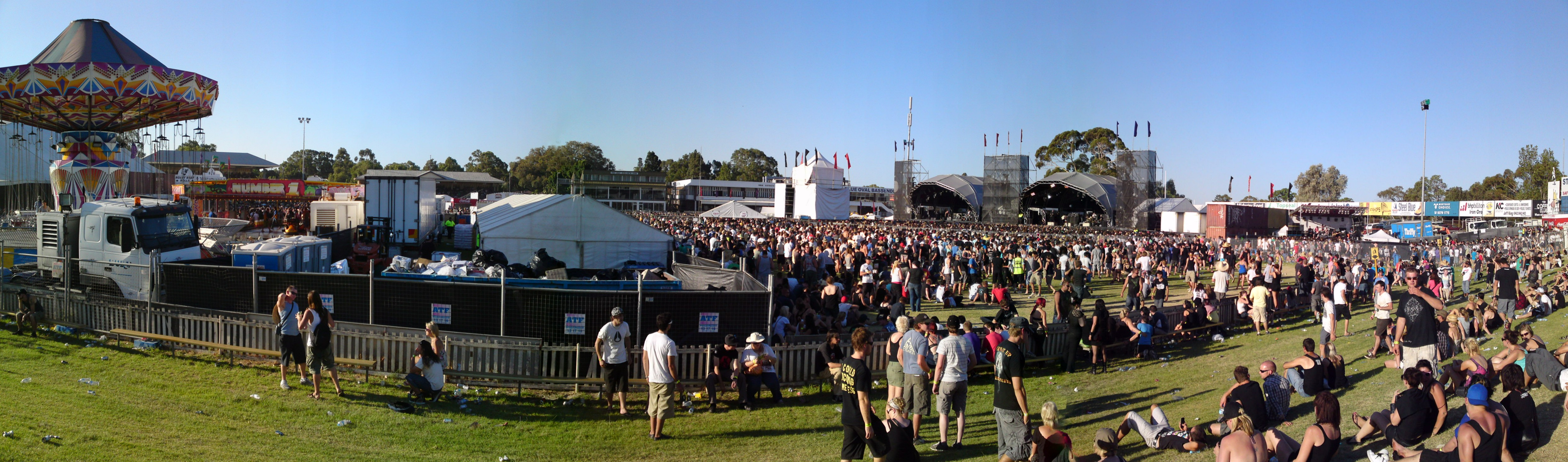
Panorama of Steel Blue Oval during Soundwave, 2010.

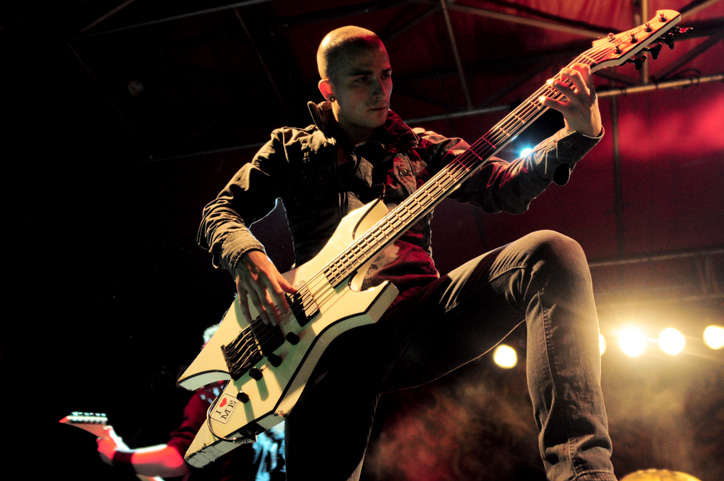
Trivium performing at the Perth Soundwave.

The first lineup announcement for the 2010 festival was made on 13 August 2009, the headliners were Faith No More, Jane's Addiction and Placebo, the lineup also featured Paramore, AFI, Jimmy Eat World (who replaced My Chemical Romance) and HIM.

This festival featured 46 acts across six stages.

=== Locations ===
- RNA Showgrounds, Brisbane, 20 February 2010
- Eastern Creek Raceway, Sydney, 21 February 2010
- Melbourne Showgrounds, Melbourne, 26 February 2010
- Bonython Park, Adelaide, 27 February 2010
- Steel Blue Oval, Perth, 1 March 2010

=== Lineup ===
- Faith No More (USA)
- ~~My Chemical Romance (USA)~~
- Jimmy Eat World (USA) ^{[C]}
- Jane's Addiction (USA)
- Placebo (UK)
- AFI (USA)
- Paramore (USA)
- HIM (FIN)
- Alexisonfire (CAN)
- Taking Back Sunday (USA)
- Trivium (USA)
- Sunny Day Real Estate (USA)
- Eagles of Death Metal (USA)
- The Get Up Kids (USA)
- Enter Shikari (UK)
- Reel Big Fish (USA)
- Meshuggah (SWE)
- Anthrax (USA)
- Glassjaw (USA)
- All Time Low (USA)
- You Me at Six (UK)
- A Day to Remember (USA)
- It Dies Today (USA)
- Escape the Fate (USA)
- Clutch (USA)
- Set Your Goals (USA)
- Anti-Flag (USA)
- Isis (USA)
- Gallows (UK)
- A Wilhelm Scream (USA)
- The Weakerthans (CAN)
- Emarosa (USA)
- Motion City Soundtrack (USA)
- Anvil (CAN)
- Architects (UK) ^{[A]}
- ~~The Devil Wears Prada (USA)~~
- Comeback Kid (CAN)
- The Almost (USA)
- Dance Gavin Dance (USA)
- Four Year Strong (USA)
- Shinedown (USA)
- Whitechapel (USA)
- The Aquabats (USA)
- This Is Hell (USA) ^{[B]}
- ~~Maximum the Hormone (JPN)~~
- Rolo Tomassi (UK)
- Baroness (USA)
- Rx Bandits (USA)
- The Creepshow (CAN)

=== Local acts ===
Brisbane

- Too Late Escape
- Adelle

Sydney

- Heroes for Hire

Melbourne

- Death Audio

Adelaide

- ISAW

Perth

- Vanity

Notes

*A Architects replaced The Devil Wears Prada, who withdrew from the lineup so they could support Killswitch Engage on their US tour
*B This Is Hell replaced Maximum the Hormone, who withdrew from the lineup due to drummer Nao being hospitalized
*C Jimmy Eat World replaced My Chemical Romance, who withdrew from the lineup due to lead singer Gerard Way suffering from severe vocal problems
*D Closure in Moscow were removed from the line up with no explanation or replacement act.

== 2011 ==
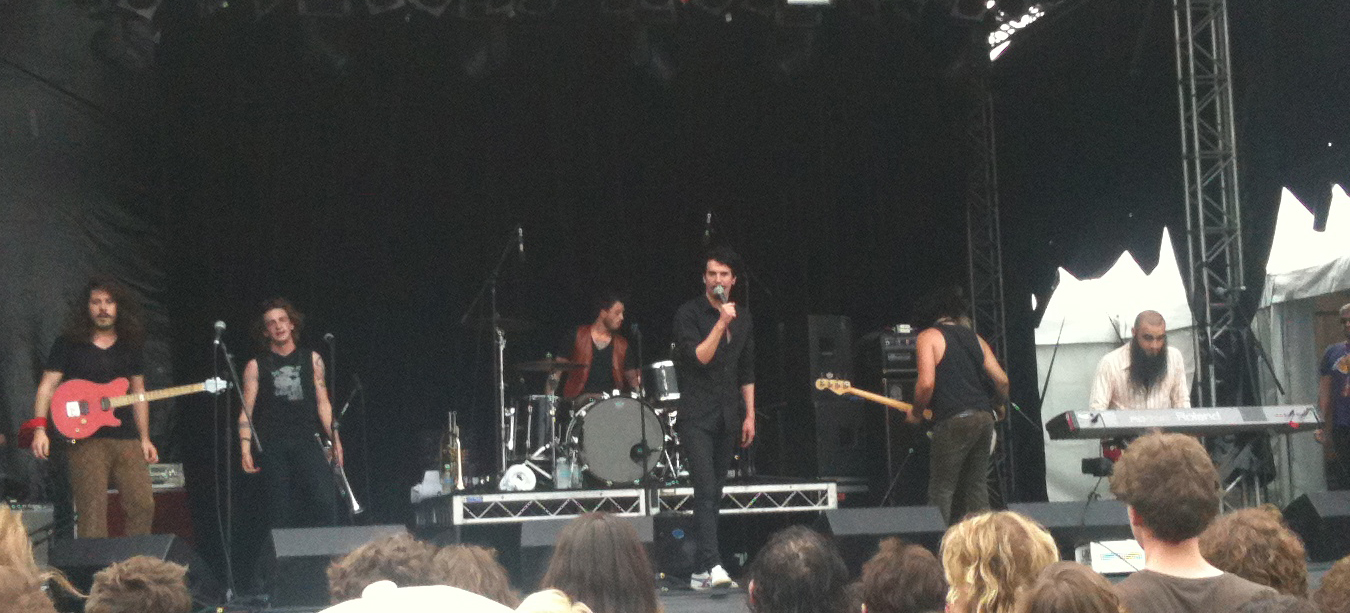
Foxy Shazam performing in Sydney

The first lineup announcement for the 2011 festival was made on 5 August 2010, the headliners were Iron Maiden and Queens of the Stone Age. The lineup also included The Starting Line, who reunited for the festival.

This festival featured 71 acts across eight stages.

=== Locations ===
- RNA Showgrounds, Brisbane, 26 February 2011
- Olympic Park, Sydney, 27 February 2011
- Melbourne Showgrounds, Melbourne, 4 March 2011
- Bonython Park, Adelaide, 5 March 2011
- Claremont Showground, Perth, 7 March 2011

=== Lineup ===
Lineup

- Iron Maiden (UK)
- Queens of the Stone Age (USA)
- Slayer (USA) ^{[A]}
- Rob Zombie (USA)
- Primus (USA)
- Slash (USA)
- Thirty Seconds to Mars (USA)
- Bullet for My Valentine (UK)
- One Day as a Lion (USA)
- Stone Sour (USA)
- ~~Avenged Sevenfold (USA)~~ ^{[B]}
- Sum 41 (CAN) ^{[C]}
- Third Eye Blind (USA)
- Murderdolls (USA)
- Social Distortion (USA)
- Millencolin (SWE)
- Gang of Four (UK)
- New Found Glory (USA)
- Pennywise (USA)
- Bring Me the Horizon (UK)
- Anberlin (USA)
- Dimmu Borgir (NOR)
- The Gaslight Anthem (USA)
- Coheed and Cambria (USA)
- DevilDriver (USA)
- Monster Magnet (USA)
- Sevendust (USA)
- Less Than Jake (USA)
- The Bronx (USA)
- The Amity Affliction
- Silverstein (CAN)
- Terror (USA)
- MxPx (USA)
- Protest the Hero (CAN)
- Melvins (USA)
- 36 Crazyfists (USA)
- Ill Niño (USA)
- The Ataris (USA)
- Fucked Up (CAN)
- Bayside (USA)
- Feeder (UK)
- The Starting Line (USA)
- H_{2}O (USA)
- Mad Caddies (USA)
- The Maine (USA)
- ~~Saxon (UK)~~ ^{[D]}
- Trash Talk (USA)
- Mayday Parade (USA)
- Foxy Shazam (USA)
- The Rocket Summer (USA)
- Never Shout Never (USA)
- The Blackout (UK)
- Polar Bear Club (USA) ^{[E]}
- Asking Alexandria (UK)
- All That Remains (USA)
- High on Fire (USA)
- Dommin (USA)
- The Sword (USA)
- Kylesa (USA)
- We the Kings (USA)
- Blessthefall (USA) ^{[F]}
- There for Tomorrow (USA)
- Breathe Carolina (USA)
- Taking Dawn (USA)
- I See Stars (USA)
- Rise to Remain (UK)
- Nonpoint (USA)
- Veara (USA)
- Every Avenue (USA)
- This Town Needs Guns (UK) ^{[G]}
- International Superheroes of Hardcore (USA) ^{[C]}^{[H]}

=== Local acts ===
Brisbane

- Tria Mera
- Friends with the Enemy

Sydney

- Blatherskite

Melbourne

- Anchors

Adelaide

- Paper Arms

Perth

- Sensory Amusia
- Lacrymae
- Chainsaw Hookers

Notes

*A Slayer pulled out of the Sydney show at the last minute due to Tom Araya being admitted to hospital
*B Avenged Sevenfold withdrew due to a disagreement with promoters over their allocated timeslot
*C Sum 41 only performed in Brisbane and Sydney due to Deryck Whibley's hospitalisation with severe pneumonia. Replaced by International Superheroes of Hardcore
*D Saxon withdrew due to album commitments and family illness
*E Polar Bear Club replaced Alesana, who withdrew from the lineup for unknown reasons
*F Blessthefall replaced A Skylit Drive, who withdrew from the lineup for unknown reasons
*G This Town Needs Guns were added as a bonus band after the two dropouts
*H International Superheroes of Hardcore did not appear in Perth

== 2012 ==
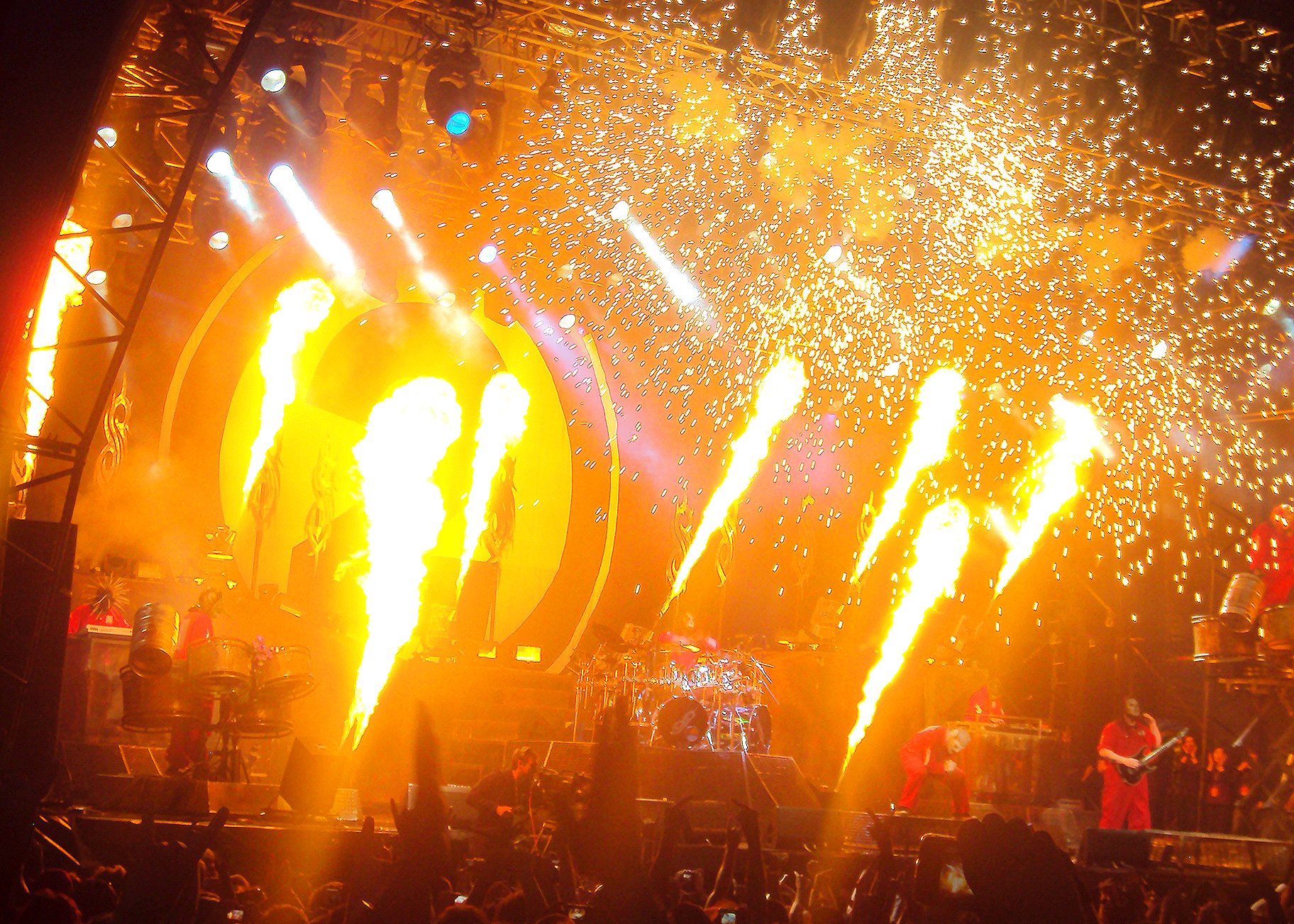
Slipknot performing at Melbourne's Soundwave

The lineup for the 2012 festival was first announced on 7 October 2011. The 2012 Soundwave lineup featured System of a Down, Slipknot, Limp Bizkit and Marilyn Manson.

This was the first time Limp Bizkit had toured Australia in eleven years. Their previous tour was the 2001 Big Day Out festival, which was marred by the death of 16-year-old Jessica Michalik during their performance at the Sydney show. Limp Bizkit singer Fred Durst paid tribute to Michalik at each Soundwave date and openly criticised Big Day Out organisers.

The festival also featured a reunited Coal Chamber, who played their first shows since 2003, and also marked the final shows of emo group Thursday.

This festival featured 95 acts across eleven stages.

=== Locations ===
- RNA Showgrounds, Brisbane, 25 February 2012,
- Olympic Park, Sydney, 26 February 2012
- Melbourne Showgrounds, Melbourne, 2 March 2012,
- Bonython Park, Adelaide, 3 March 2012,
- Claremont Showground, Perth, 5 March 2012,

=== Lineup ===
- System of a Down (USA)
- Slipknot (USA)
- Limp Bizkit (USA)
- Marilyn Manson (USA)
- A Day to Remember (USA)
- ~~Hole (USA)~~
- Bush (UK) ^{[A]}
- Machine Head (USA)
- Lamb of God (USA)
- Bad Religion (USA)
- Mastodon (USA)
- Trivium (USA)
- Alter Bridge (USA)
- In Flames (SWE)
- Lostprophets (UK)
- Staind (USA)
- Switchfoot (USA) ^{[B]}^{[F]}
- Angels & Airwaves (USA)
- The Used (USA)
- Cobra Starship (USA)
- Wednesday 13 (USA)
- You Me at Six (UK)
- Devin Townsend Project (CAN)
- Coal Chamber (USA)
- Unearth (USA)
- Unwritten Law (USA)
- Strung Out (USA)
- Dashboard Confessional (USA)
- Thursday (USA)
- Raised Fist (SWE)
- Dillinger Escape Plan (USA)
- Black Label Society (USA)
- Underoath (USA)
- Saves the Day (USA)
- Circa Survive (USA)
- Steel Panther (USA)
- The Black Dahlia Murder (USA)
- Kids in Glass Houses (UK)
- Meshuggah (SWE)
- The Pretty Reckless (USA)
- Cathedral (UK)
- Paradise Lost (UK) ^{[B]}
- Shadows Fall (USA)
- Tonight Alive
- Jack's Mannequin (USA)
- Fireworks (USA)
- Zebrahead (USA)
- Enter Shikari (UK)
- The Sisters of Mercy (UK)
- Four Year Strong (USA)
- Black Veil Brides (USA)
- Madina Lake (USA)
- Forever the Sickest Kids (USA)
- Hatebreed (USA)
- Biohazard (USA)
- Motionless in White (USA)
- In This Moment (USA)
- Break Even
- Heaven Shall Burn (GER)
- CKY (USA)
- Times of Grace (USA)
- Street Dogs (USA)
- Kvelertak (NOR)
- Gojira (FRA)
- Hyro Da Hero (USA)
- letlive. (USA)
- Hellyeah (USA)
- Cro-Mags (USA)
- Holy Grail (USA)
- Your Demise (UK)
- Kittie (CAN)
- A Rocket to the Moon (USA)
- The Ready Set (USA)
- The Menzingers (USA)
- Dream On, Dreamer
- Attack Attack! (USA)
- Dredg (USA)
- The Smoking Hearts (UK)
- The Summer Set (USA)
- The Cab (USA)
- ~~Black Tide (USA)~~ ^{[E]}
- Relient K (USA)
- VersaEmerge (USA)
- Heroes for Hire
- Kill Hannah (USA)
- Chimaira (USA)
- Watain (SWE)
- Conditions (USA)
- The Dangerous Summer (USA)
- Royal Republic (SWE)
- These Kids Wear Crowns (CAN) ^{[C]}
- Framing Hanley (USA)
- I am The Avalanche (USA)
- Turisas (FIN)
- Cherri Bomb (USA)
- River City Extension (USA)
- Mission in Motion ^{[D]}

=== Local acts ===
Brisbane

- Milestones

Sydney

- The Sweet Apes

Melbourne

- Aitches

Adelaide

- Admella

Perth

- Sensory Amusia

Notes

*A Bush replaced Hole, who withdrew from the lineup due to a dispute with Soundwave promoters
*B Paradise Lost and Switchfoot replaced DragonForce, who withdrew from the lineup due to recording delays
*C These Kids Wear Crowns did not play in Brisbane due to being double-booked for a sold-out arena show with Simple Plan in Canada
*D Mission in Motion did not appear in Melbourne
*E Black Tide withdrew from the lineup due to a family emergency
*F Switchfoot withdrew from the Adelaide and Perth shows due to a family emergency

== 2013 ==
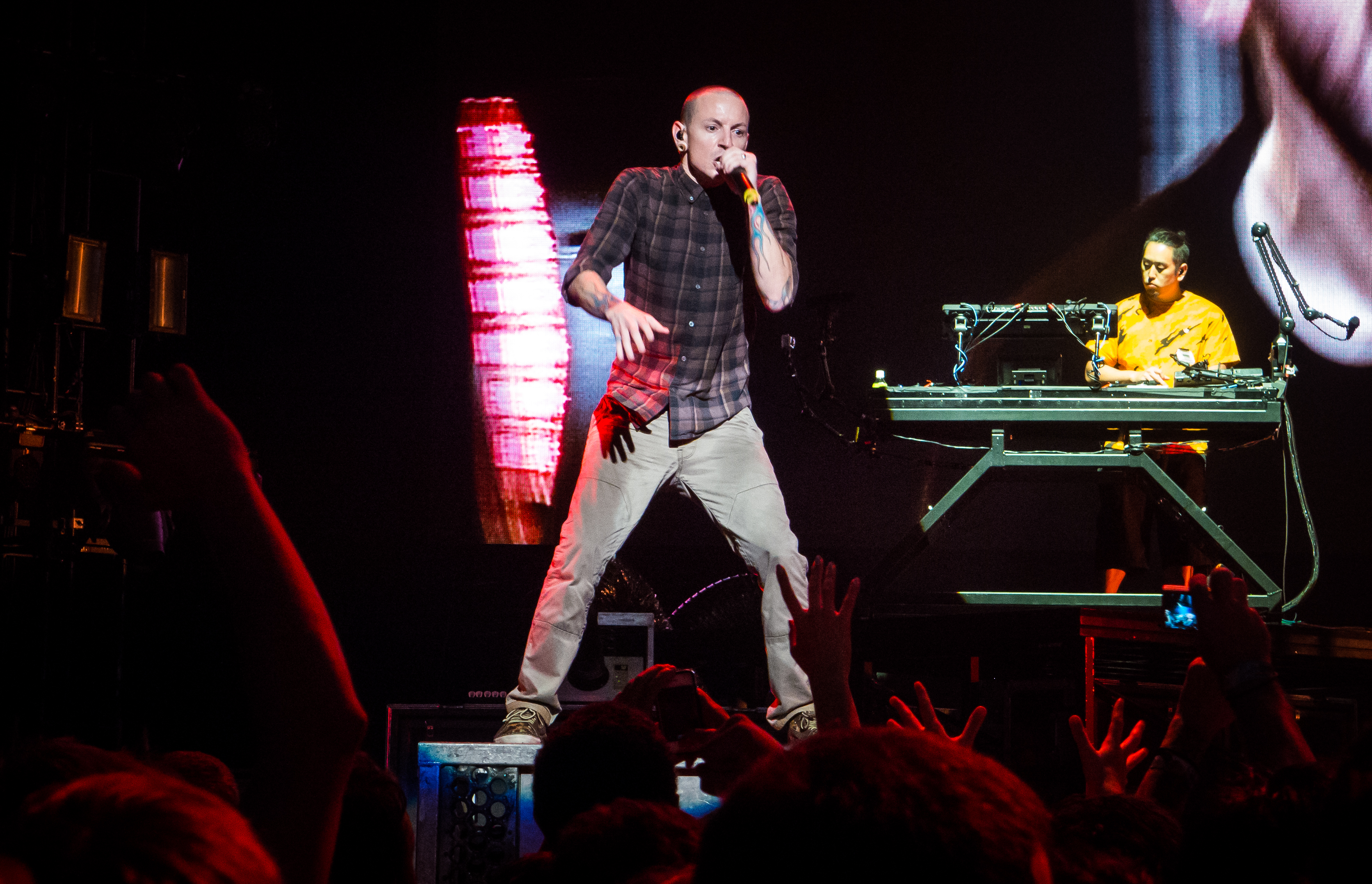
Chester Bennington from Linkin Park performing at Melbourne's Soundwave

The lineup for the 2013 Soundwave Festival was first announced on 8 August 2012, featuring headliners Metallica, Linkin Park and Blink-182, along with sub headliners A Perfect Circle, The Offspring, Garbage, Paramore, Tomahawk, Cypress Hill and Killswitch Engage

This edition of Soundwave was noted for its "drummers' curse", where several bands lost members in the week leading up to the festival:

- Blink-182 drummer Travis Barker was to attempt the long-haul flight and participate in Blink-182's first Australian tour since 2004, saying "[I'm] getting knocked out and getting on a plane to Australia". Barker survived a plane crash in 2008 and suffers from aerophobia. However, after months of counselling and medication, Barker could not overcome his fear of flying and was replaced on the tour by Brooks Wackerman from Bad Religion.
- Anthrax drummer Charlie Benante was replaced by Jon Dette from Animetal USA due to personal issues
- Slayer drummer Dave Lombardo announced on Facebook that he was fired due to a dispute over money, he was also replaced by Jon Dette, who was already filling in for Anthrax and has previously played in Slayer
- The Vandals drummer Josh Freese (formerly of A Perfect Circle and Paramore, both were also on the lineup) was replaced by Alkaline Trio drummer Derek Grant due to other commitments.
- Six Feet Under withdrew from the lineup due to drummer Kevin Talley being injured in a dirtbike accident
- In addition, Shai Hulud vocalist Justin Kraus was hospitalised with chest pain immediately after playing a show in Trenton, New Jersey, he was replaced by Mike Moynihan, who was previously their vocalist between 2009 and 2011
- Gallows guitarist Stephen Carter left the band in the days leading up to the festival, the band continued as a four-piece.

There was also controversy regarding bands such as Pierce the Veil and The Amity Affliction having their sets cut short in Perth due to complaints from local residents – after this Maddah doubted the festival's future in Western Australia.

This festival featured 72 acts across nine stages (eight stages in Perth).

=== Locations ===
- RNA Showgrounds, Brisbane, 23 February 2013
- Olympic Park, Sydney, 24 February 2013,
- Flemington Racecourse, Melbourne, 1 March 2013,
- Bonython Park, Adelaide, 2 March 2013,
- Claremont Showground, Perth, 4 March 2013,

=== Lineup ===
- Metallica (USA)
- Linkin Park (USA)
- Blink-182 (USA)
- A Perfect Circle (USA)
- The Offspring (USA)
- Paramore (USA)
- Slayer (USA)
- Garbage (USA) ^{[A]}
- Anthrax (USA)
- Killswitch Engage (USA)
- Cypress Hill (USA)
- Bullet for My Valentine (UK)
- Tomahawk (USA)
- Stone Sour (USA)
- Bring Me the Horizon (UK)
- Kyuss Lives! (USA)
- Sum 41 (CAN)
- DragonForce (UK)
- All Time Low (USA)
- Flogging Molly (USA) ^{[B]}
- Ghost (SWE)
- Duff McKagan's Loaded (USA)
- Billy Talent (CAN)
- Motion City Soundtrack (USA)
- Mindless Self Indulgence (USA) ^{[C]}
- The Amity Affliction
- The Vandals (USA)
- Sick of It All (USA)
- Kingdom of Sorrow (USA)
- Fozzy (USA)
- The Lawrence Arms (USA)
- Sleeping With Sirens (USA)
- Cancer Bats (CAN)
- The Blackout (UK)
- Gallows (UK)
- Madball (USA)
- Fucked Up (CAN)
- Vision of Disorder (USA)
- Pierce the Veil (USA)
- Periphery (USA)
- The Sword (USA)
- Shai Hulud (USA)
- Of Mice & Men (USA)
- This Is Hell (USA)
- Miss May I (USA)
- Danko Jones (CAN)
- Lucero (USA)
- Woe, Is Me (USA)
- The Wonder Years (USA)
- Polar Bear Club (USA)
- While She Sleeps (UK)
- Cerebral Ballzy (USA)
- The Early November (USA)
- Such Gold (USA)
- ~~Six Feet Under (USA)~~ ^{[D]}
- The Dear Hunter (USA)
- Chelsea Grin (USA)
- Deaf Havana (UK)
- Red Fang (USA)
- Versus The World (USA)
- The Chariot (USA)
- ~~Blood On The Dance Floor (USA)~~ ^{[E]}
- Confession
- Orange Goblin (UK)
- Chunk! No, Captain Chunk! (FRA)
- Sylosis (UK)
- Memphis May Fire (USA)
- Crossfaith (JPN)
- Northlane
- ~~Dr. Acula (USA)~~ ^{[F]}
- Sharks (UK)
- O'Brother (USA)
- Milestones
- Living With Lions (CAN) ^{[G]}
- Puscifer (USA) ^{[H]}
- Malakyte ^{[I]}

=== Local acts ===
Brisbane

- The Schoenberg Automaton

Sydney

- Born Lion

Melbourne

- Party Vibez

Adelaide

- Life Pilot

Notes

*A Garbage did not perform in Sydney due to logistical issues
*B Flogging Molly did not appear in Perth
*C Mindless Self Indulgence did not perform in Melbourne due to logistical issues
*D Six Feet Under were forced to withdraw from the lineup after drummer Kevin Talley was injured in an accident
*E Blood On The Dance Floor withdrew from the lineup due to financial issues
*F Dr. Acula broke up in October 2012 and were subsequently removed from the lineup
*G Living With Lions and Mark Tremonti were added to the lineup on 30 October 2012, but Tremonti pulled out the next day due to clashing tour commitments.
*H Puscifer only played in Sydney and Adelaide, they were originally listed as "Special Guests".
*I Malakyte only played in Brisbane, they were originally listed as "Special Guests"
*J The winners of the Triple J Unearthed competition for Perth, In League, were not able to perform due to time constraints alongside Soundwave's conflict with the Claremont Council

== 2014 ==
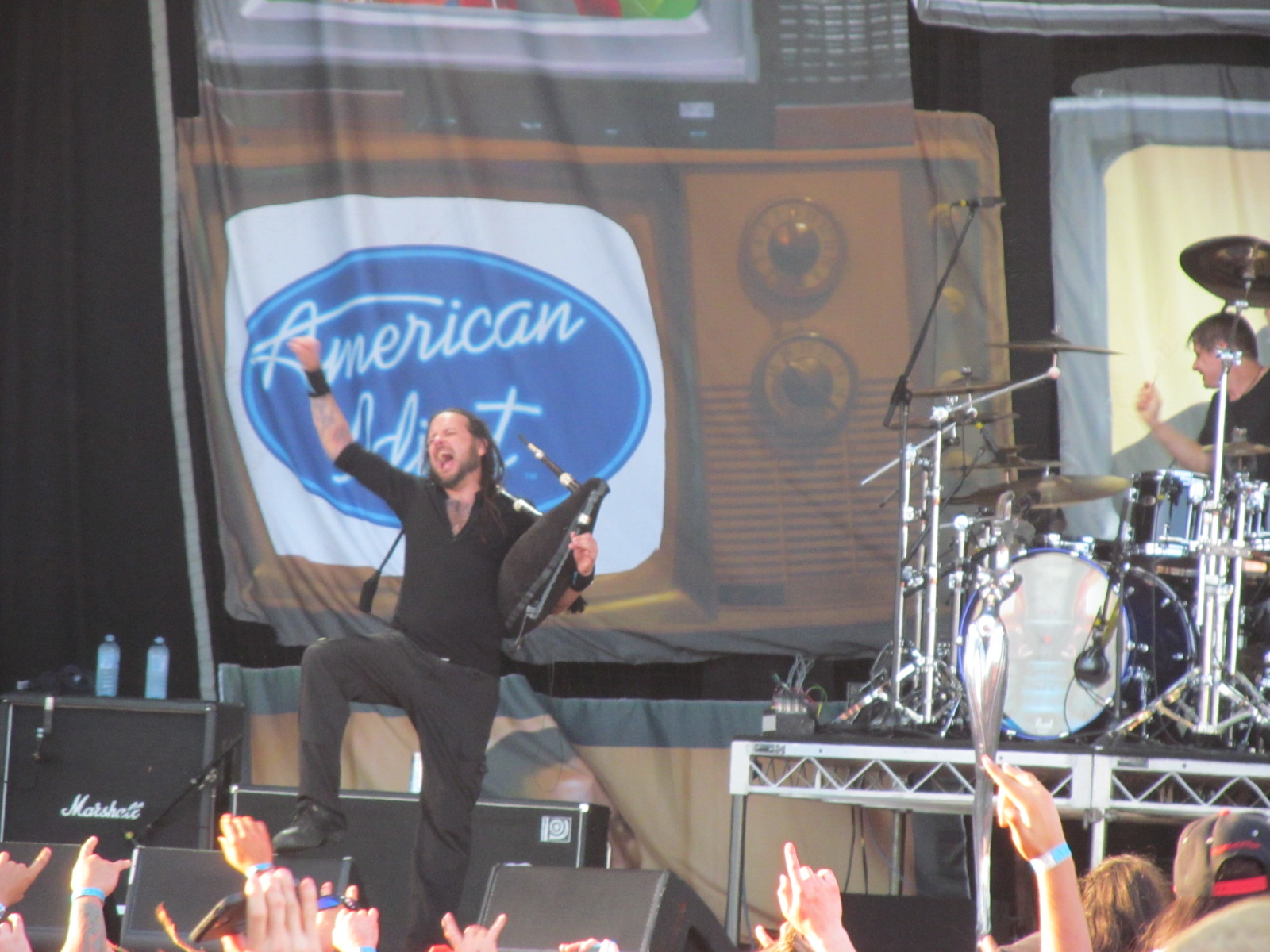
Jonathan Davis from Korn performing at Soundwave in Perth

The lineup for the 2014 festival was first announced on 23 August 2013. The lineup containing 94 bands, featured Green Day, Avenged Sevenfold, Korn and Alice in Chains

The Perth festival was relocated from Claremont Showground to Arena Joondalup, 25 km north of Perth, two weeks before the beginning of the festival due to Soundwave's ongoing conflict with the Claremont Council. Following a similar situation at the Perth leg of Big Day Out in January of that year, which was also relocated from Claremont Showground to Arena Joondalup, AJ Maddah confirmed that 2014 would be the last Soundwave held in Perth, where the festival originated.

=== Locations ===
- RNA Showgrounds, Brisbane, 22 February 2014,
- Olympic Park, Sydney, 23 February 2014,
- Flemington Racecourse, Melbourne, 28 February 2014,
- Bonython Park, Adelaide, 1 March 2014,
- Arena Joondalup, Perth, 3 March 2014

=== Lineup ===
- Green Day (USA)
- Avenged Sevenfold (USA)
- Alice in Chains (USA)
- A Day to Remember (USA)
- Richie Sambora (USA)
- ~~Stone Temple Pilots (USA)~~
- The Living End ^{[A]}
- Rob Zombie (USA)
- ~~Megadeth (USA)~~ ^{[B]}
- Mastodon (USA)
- Placebo (UK)
- HIM (FIN)
- AFI (USA)
- Korn (USA)
- Alter Bridge (USA)
- Trivium (USA)
- Pennywise (USA)
- Jimmy Eat World (USA)
- Down (USA)
- Devildriver (USA)
- The Dillinger Escape Plan (USA)
- Glassjaw (USA)
- Panic! at the Disco (USA)
- Eagles of Death Metal (USA)
- Less Than Jake (USA)
- Mayday Parade (USA)
- Asking Alexandria (UK)
- Biffy Clyro (UK)
- ~~Newsted (USA)~~ ^{[C]}
- ~~Sevendust (USA)~~
- Filter (USA) ^{[D]}
- Rocket from the Crypt (USA)
- Baroness (USA)
- Suicide Silence (USA)
- Clutch (USA)
- Alkaline Trio (USA)
- The Ghost Inside (USA)
- The Porkers
- Gojira (FRA)
- ~~Desaparecidos (USA)~~ ^{[E]}
- ††† (Crosses) (USA)
- Zebrahead (USA)
- Five Finger Death Punch (USA)
- Satyricon (NOR)
- August Burns Red (USA)
- Testament (USA)
- Ill Niño (USA)
- Living Colour (USA)
- Mutemath (USA)
- Black Veil Brides (USA)
- letlive. (USA)
- I Killed the Prom Queen
- Motionless In White (USA)
- Gwar (USA)
- The Black Dahlia Murder (USA)
- Mushroomhead (USA)
- Finch (USA)
- Authority Zero (USA)
- Dream On, Dreamer
- Stiff Little Fingers (UK)
- Thy Art Is Murder
- Graveyard (SWE)
- Pulled Apart by Horses (UK)
- Nancy Vandal
- Bowling for Soup (USA)
- Trash Talk (USA)
- Skindred (UK)
- Dir En Grey (JPN) ^{[F]}
- Volbeat (DNK) ^{[G]}
- Amon Amarth (SWE)
- Terror (USA)
- ~~Whitechapel (USA)~~ ^{[H]}
- Defiler (USA)
- TesseracT (UK)
- Deez Nuts
- The Story So Far (USA)
- 10 Years (USA)
- In Hearts Wake
- Breathe Carolina (USA)
- ~~Hardcore Superstar (SWE)~~ ^{[I]}
- I Call Fives (USA)
- Hactivist (UK)
- Walking Papers (USA)
- Our Last Night (USA)
- Coliseum (USA)
- Devil You Know (USA)
- Your Demise (UK)
- Soil (USA)
- Heaven's Basement (UK)
- The BossHoss (GER)
- Nostalghia
- DARKC3II
- Uncle Acid & the Deadbeats (UK)
- The Defiled (UK)
- Real Friends (USA)
- Upon a Burning Body (USA)
- The Dangerkids (USA)

=== Local acts ===
Brisbane
- Chronolyth
- HELM

Sydney

- Red Bee
- Trophy Eyes

Melbourne

- The Bennies
- King Parrot
- Ceres

Adelaide

- Truth Corroded
- Sierra
- Se Bon Ki Ra

Perth

- Xenobiotic
- Chaos Divine
- Make Them Suffer
- The Decline

Notes

*A The Living End replaced Stone Temple Pilots, who withdrew from the lineup due to scheduling conflicts.
*B Megadeth withdrew from the lineup due to unspecified reasons
*C Newsted withdrew from the lineup due to unspecified reasons.
*D Filter replaced Sevendust, who withdrew from the lineup due to a financial dispute with Soundwave promoters.
*E Desaparecidos withdrew from the lineup for personal reasons.
*F Dir En Grey did not appear in Perth.
*G Volbeat withdrew from the Adelaide and Perth shows due to a family emergency.
*H Whitechapel withdrew from the lineup due to the death of an immediate family member.
*I Hardcore Superstar withdrew from the lineup due to a scheduling dispute with Soundwave promoters.

== 2015 ==
On 28 June 2014, Soundwave announced that it will become a two-day festival, held over two consecutive weekends, with half the bands announced playing day one and the other half playing day two, criss-crossing between Adelaide and Melbourne, then Sydney and Brisbane. AJ Maddah stated on Twitter "Putting the line-up across [two] days enables us to minimise clashes; give bands longer sets, better staging, production [and] infrastructure. I am also hoping that this will give fans better value for money and a less stressful day." AJ Maddah later confirmed that 2015 was the last Soundwave for Adelaide in the foreseeable future as it made a $300,000 loss in 2014, but with the $1,400,000 loss in 2015 due to lackluster ticket sales being too large to subsidise out of the other cities.

=== Locations ===
- Bonython Park, Adelaide, 21 February 2015 (Day One) & 22 February 2015 (Day Two)
- Melbourne Showgrounds, Melbourne, 21 February 2015 (Day Two) & 22 February 2015 (Day One)
- Olympic Park, Sydney, 28 February (Day One) & 1 March 2015 (Day Two)
- RNA Showgrounds, Brisbane, 28 February (Day Two) & 1 March 2015 (Day One)

Day One Lineup

- Faith No More (USA)
- Soundgarden (USA)
- Incubus (USA)
- Lamb of God (USA)
- Ministry (USA)
- Antemasque (USA)
- Gerard Way (USA)
- New Found Glory (USA)
- Fear Factory (USA)
- Steel Panther (USA)
- Falling in Reverse (USA)
- DragonForce (UK)
- Hollywood Undead (USA)
- One Ok Rock (JPN)
- Atreyu (USA)
- The Devil Wears Prada (USA)
- Godflesh (UK)
- The Aquabats (USA)
- Area-7
- Ne Obliviscaris
- Mayhem (NOR)
- Lower Than Atlantis (UK)
- Bayside (USA)
- Nothing More (USA)
- He Is Legend (USA)
- Fireworks (USA)
- King Parrot
- Crown the Empire (USA)
- Icon for Hire (USA)
- Emily's Army/Swimmers (USA)
- ~~Rival Sons (USA)~~ ^{[A]}
- The Interrupters (USA)
- Monuments (UK)
- The Color Morale (USA)
- Sleepwave (USA)
- Patent Pending (USA)
- The Bennies
- Raglans (IRL)
- Deathstars (SWE)
- The Treatment (UK) ^{[B]}
- Terror Universal (USA)

Day Two Lineup

- Slipknot (USA)
- The Smashing Pumpkins (USA)
- Slash featuring Myles Kennedy & The Conspirators (USA)
- Marilyn Manson (USA)
- Fall Out Boy (USA)
- Judas Priest (UK)
- Millencolin (SWE)
- All Time Low (USA)
- Godsmack (USA)
- Killer Be Killed (USA)
- Exodus (USA)
- Tonight Alive
- The Vandals (USA)
- Lagwagon (USA)
- Papa Roach (USA)
- Of Mice & Men (USA)
- Escape The Fate (USA)
- The Wonder Years (USA)
- Twin Atlantic (UK)
- Animals As Leaders (USA)
- Apocalyptica (FIN)
- Fucked Up (CAN)
- ~~Evergreen Terrace (USA)~~ ^{[C]}
- Nonpoint (USA)
- Crossfaith (JPN)
- Butcher Babies (USA)
- King 810 (USA)
- The Swellers (USA)
- Conditions (USA)
- Confession
- coldrain (JPN)
- Le Butcherettes (MX)
- Dayshell (USA)
- This Wild Life (USA)

=== Local acts ===
Brisbane

- Columbus

Sydney

- Bare Bones

Melbourne

- I, Valiance

Adelaide

- A Ghost Orchestra

Notes

*A Rival Sons withdrew from the lineup for personal reasons.
*B The Treatment did not appear in Adelaide.
*C Evergreen Terrace withdrew from the lineup due to drummer Brad Moxey suffering serious injuries in an accident.

== 2016 (cancelled) ==
On 20 March 2015, AJ Maddah stated that Soundwave 2016 would return to the one-day format and would be held in January instead of the usual late February/early March dates. He also later stated that the 2016 lineup would be announced via "drip-feeding" and would also be smaller in order to achieve longer set times for bands.

Bullet for My Valentine was announced as the first act of Soundwave 2016 via the band's social media accounts and the official Soundwave website on 14 August 2015, and over the next four months, Disturbed was announced as the headliner and 24 other bands were added for a total of 26 bands.

=== Locations ===
- RNA Showgrounds, Brisbane, 23 January 2016
- Olympic Park, Sydney, 24 January 2016
- RAS Melbourne Showground, Melbourne, 26 January 2016

=== Lineup ===
- Disturbed (USA)
- Bring Me the Horizon (UK)
- The Prodigy (UK)
- Deftones (USA)
- NOFX (USA)
- Bullet for My Valentine (UK)
- Public Enemy (USA)
- ~~L7 (USA)~~ ^{[A]}
- Refused (SWE)
- Killswitch Engage (USA)
- Metal Allegiance (USA)
- Hatebreed (USA)
- Soulfly (USA)
- Northlane
- Dead Letter Circus
- Ill Niño (USA)
- Relient K (USA)
- frnkiero and the cellabration (USA)
- Nothing but Thieves (UK)
- Frenzal Rhomb
- Failure (USA)
- Lordi (FIN)
- Walls of Jericho (USA)
- Devil You Know (USA)
- Terror Universal (USA)
- Moose Blood (UK)
- DARKC3LL

Notes

*A L7 withdrew from the lineup due to unspecified reasons.

=== Cancellation ===
On 15 December 2015, Maddah tweeted that 2016 would be the final ever Soundwave, stating it was due to "stress and haters", and two days later he tweeted that the festival had been officially cancelled.

Various problems contributed to its cancellation, including:

- Poor ticket sales (Maddah once stated that 2016 would "sell out instantly", but around 20,000 tickets in total had been sold at the time of its cancellation)
- L7 withdrawing from the lineup for unspecified reasons
- Bring Me the Horizon claiming that they weren't officially locked in for the festival despite being announced months beforehand
- The festival's venues reportedly not being booked
- Reports surfacing that Maddah owes over $10 million to all the bands who played the 2015 festival

== Compilation albums ==
Official compilation CDs featuring artists who performed at the festival were released through Shock Records.

- Soundwave 2008 (2008)
- Soundwave 2009 (2009)
- Soundwave 2010 (2010)
- Soundwave 2011 (2011)
- Soundwave 2012 (2012)
- Soundwave 2013 (2013)
- Soundwave 2014 (2014)
- Soundwave 2015 (2015)

== See also ==
- List of historic rock festivals
