= Botany Bay (song) =

1885 English musical burlesque song

"Botany Bay" is a song that can be traced back to the musical burlesque, Little Jack Sheppard, staged at the Gaiety Theatre, London, England, in 1885 and in Melbourne, Australia, in 1886. The show was written by Henry Pottinger Stephens and William Yardley, with music composed and arranged by Wilhelm Meyer Lutz. The show's programme credits "Botany Bay" as "Old Air arr. Lutz". Sheet music from Allan & Co. in Australia credits Florian Pascal, the pseudonym of Joseph Williams Jr. (1847–1923), a music publisher and composer who published the show's music. Pascal composed other numbers in the score but received no credit for "Botany Bay" in the programme.

== Earlier history ==
The song's earlier history is less clear. A song "Botany Bay", catalogued by the British Library as from the 1780s and described as "sung by the Anacreontic Society", has no obvious connection, being concerned with Cook's landing rather than the subsequent deportation of convicts. However, the song's verses have lines in common with Farewell to Judges and Juries which had been performed in 1820. As for the melody, The Era (London) of 25 October 1890 describes it as "written over a hundred years ago", and it appears to have been adapted from the folk song "Mush, Mush", with its refrain "Mush, mush, mush, turaliaddy! Sing, mush, mush, mush, turalia!".

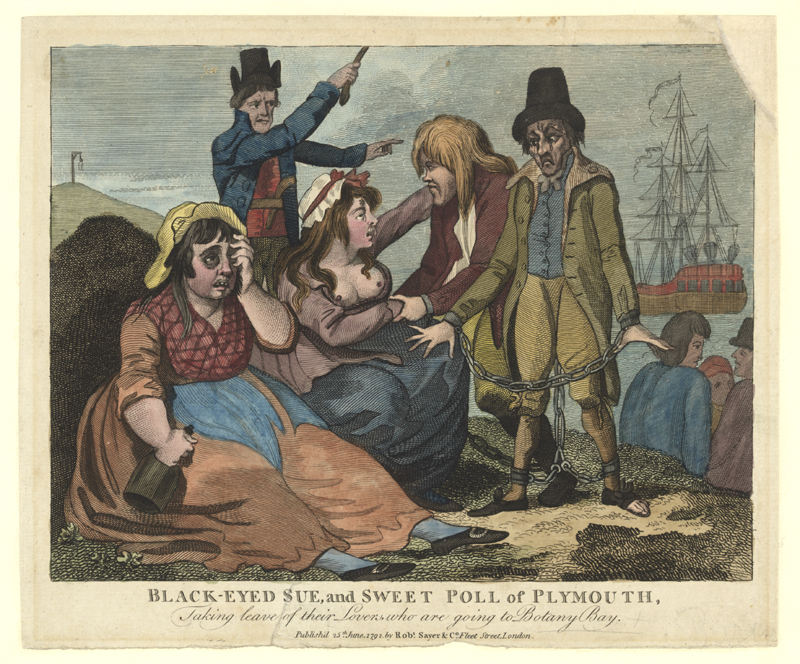
Black-eyed Sue and Sweet Poll of Plymouth taking leave of their lovers who are going to Botany Bay

Botany Bay was the designated settlement for the first fleet when it arrived in Australia in the eighteenth century. It was a settlement intended for the transport of convicts to Australia. The song describes the period in the late 18th and 19th centuries, when British convicts were deported to the various Australian penal colonies by the British government for seven-year terms as an alternative to incarceration in Britain. The second verse is about life on the convict ships, and the last verse is directed to English girls and boys as warning not to steal.

After the production of Little Jack Sheppard, the song became a popular folk song and has been sung and recorded by Burl Ives and many others. It is played as a children's song on compilations, particularly in Australia.

The song is referenced in various documentaries researching the transport of convicts to Australia, although that practice in New South Wales had ended in 1840, 45 years before the song was written.

== Lyrics ==
There are no "official" lyrics to "Botany Bay" and slight variations can be found in different sources and by different performers.

Farewell to old England for ever,
Farewell to my rum coes (Note: also "rum skulls") as well,
Farewell to the well-known Old Bailey
Where I used for (Note: sometimes "Where I once used to…") to cut such a swell.

Chorus:
Singing too-ral-li, oo-ral-li, addity,
Singing too-ral-li, oo-ral-li, ay,
Singing too-ral-li, oo-ral-li, addity,
And we're bound for Botany Bay.

There's the captain as is our commander,
There's the bo'sun and all the ship's crew,
There's the first- and the second-class passengers,
Knows what we poor convicts go through.

'Taint leaving old England we cares about,
'Taint cos we mis-spells what we knows,
But because all we light-fingered gentry
Hops around with a log on our toes.

These seven long years I've been serving now (Note: sometimes "For seven long years I'll be staying here…")
And seven long more have to stay (Note: sometimes "For seven long years and a day…")
All for bashing a bloke down our alley (Note: sometimes "Just for meeting a bloke…")
And taking his ticker away.

Oh, had I the wings of a turtle-dove,
I'd soar on my pinions so high,
Straight back (Note: also "Slap bang…") to the arms of my Polly love,
And in her sweet presence I'd die.

Now all my young Dookies and Duchesses,
Take warning from what I've to say:
Mind all is your own as you toucheses
Or you'll find us in Botany Bay.

== Covers ==
The song "Toorali" on the 2008 album Summerland from Australian band The Herd uses an adapted excerpt from the song "Botany Bay" for its chorus and main verse.

Another song titled "Toorali" by Australian post-hardcore band Eleventh He Reaches London uses parts of the song's chorus, appearing on their 2009 album Hollow Be My Name.

A verse and chorus of the song can also be heard sung by Deborah Kerr, Robert Mitchum, Peter Ustinov, and Glynis Johns in the 1960 film The Sundowners.

Kate Rusby covered the song for her 1999 album Sleepless.

Australian singer Mirusia with Dutch violinist André Rieu performed the song on their album Waltzing Matilda in 2008.

The song can also be heard being sung by itinerant Australian shearers in the US TV miniseries The Thorn Birds (1983).

American band "Primus", on their album Brown album recorded a song called Fisticuffs, talking about the Botany Bay
