= Tertia =

Tertia is the Latin word for "third". In ancient Roman the word often denoted a third daughter of a family.

== People ==
- Aemilia Tertia (circa 230-163 BC), wife of Scipio Africanus
- Junia Tertia (circa 60 BC-22 AD), daughter of Servilia Caepionis
- Licinia Tertia, (1st century BC), wife of Gaius Marius the Younger
- Mucia Tertia (1st century BC), daughter of Quintus Mucius Scaevola
- A woman of the ancient Roman Tertia gens
- Tertia (actress), 1st-century BC actress

== Other uses ==
- SS Tertia, a German cargo ship in service 1922-1924
- Tertia (album), the second album by American band Caspian
- Tertia, a reference to refer to Edith, one of the three Liddell sisters, in Lewis Carroll's poem 'All in the golden afternoon...'
- Tertia, alternative name for the organ stop tierce

== See also ==
- Tertulla (disambiguation), a diminutive
