= The Good Fight for Harmony =

The Good Fight For Harmony

Studio album by Eleventh He Reaches London
- Released: 14 December 2005; 16 August 2008; 8 June 2012
- Recorded: 2005; Bergerk! Studios, Perth, Western Australia
- Genres: Post-hardcore, progressive rock, screamo
- Length: 46:25
- Labels: Hobbledehoy Records; Good Cop Bad Cop
- Producer: Allen Smith

Eleventh He Reaches London chronology
| Diving for Treacher (2003) | The Good Fight For Harmony (2005) | Hollow Be My Name (2009) |

Re-release cover
- Cover of the 2008 Good Cop Bad Cop Records re-release

The Good Fight For Harmony is the debut album by the Australian post-hardcore band Eleventh He Reaches London. The album was initially released independently by the band in December 2005; it was then re-released in August 2008 by Good Cop Bad Cop Records. The album was remastered and released on vinyl by Hobbledehoy Records in June 2012.

In early 2005 Eleventh He Reaches London began recording their first full-length album with Allen Smith at Bergerk! Studios. During this period, the band performed at the Western Australian Music Industry Awards Festival and RTRFM's 'In The Pines', as well as being the only main stage support act on Taste of Chaos' Perth leg of their Australian tour, where they performed to a sold-out Robinson Pavilion. After six months in the recording studio, with the album mastered by Shaun O'Callaghan at Studio Couch, The Good Fight For Harmony was released on 14 December 2005. It reached the top of the local charts, almost selling out of its first pressing within a month and a half. "Say You See Why So" received airplay on Triple J and local radio.

Drummer Mark Donaldson stated: “We never really gave any thought to releasing an EP or singles, because we believe that you can get more enjoyment out of our band across an album. We wanted to release something that was quite cohesive, and had some continuity, with a good hour-long running time.”

== Reviews ==
Stephe Edwards on the Rockus website describes the album as being "a journey in genre-hopping, beauty through the unexpected, angst, reflection, frustration" and "a sound reminiscent of Red Sparowes, with all the care, consideration and humility, but in a much more brutal context."

X-Press Magazine's Mike Wafer stated "Brilliant for what it is, this album is a triumph for expressionist music, but lacks the same jaw-dropping power the band wield from the stage." He went onto to comment that "The advantage of not following traditional song structure and melodic method is that Eleventh can create epics that don't drag on, as it is unimportant as to which part of which narrative you are up to. The disadvantage, however, is that such meandering music often falls very short of being memorable."

== Track listing ==
All songs written by Eleventh He Reaches London.

| No. | Title | Length |
|---|---|---|
| 1. | "Coronation" | 3:25 |
| 2. | "Say You See Why So" | 8:48 |
| 3. | "Swarming" | 9:58 |
| 4. | "What Would Don Juan Say?" | 5:24 |
| 5. | "Ruination" | 1:31 |
| 6. | "Chilson" | 7:01 |
| 7. | "Long Grows The List Of The Live And Dead Pretenders" | 10:18 |

== Personnel ==
- Ian Lenton - vocals/electric guitar
- Jayden Worts - guitar/vocals
- Jeremy Martin - guitar/vocals
- Craig McElhinney - bass guitar
- Mark Donaldson - drums/percussion
