= Waking Season =

Studio album by Caspian
- Released: September 25, 2012
- Recorded: January 2012, April – May 2012
- Studio: Q Division (Somerville, MA); Radar Studios (Clinton, CT); Red Room Studios (Seattle, WA)
- Genre: Post-rock, indie rock, emo
- Length: 57:00
- Label: Triple Crown Records; Hobbledehoy Record Co
- Producer: Caspian and Matt Bayles

Caspian chronology
Tertia (2009)	Waking Season (2012)

Professional ratings
Aggregate scores
Source	Rating
Metacritic	89/100
Review scores
Source	Rating
AbsolutePunk	86%
Alternative Press	4.5/5 stars
Rock Sound	(9/10)
Spin	(8/10)

Waking Season is the third full-length studio album by Beverly, Massachusetts post-rock group Caspian. It is the group's first record to be produced by Matt Bayles and also their first to be released through Triple Crown Records. The album was released in CD, LP, 2XLP, and Digital Download formats on September 21, 2012 in Germany through Make My Day Records and worldwide on September 25, 2012 through Triple Crown Records. An official music video for the opening track "Waking Season" debuted on Vimeo on September 25, 2012 and was directed by Daniel Navetta. The album was later given an Australia / New Zealand release through Hobbledehoy Record Co in January 2014. In an interview with Nothingbuthopeandpassion, guitarist Calvin Joss stated that the album is "anthemically about growth and change".

== Reception ==
=== Critical reception ===
The album has garnered mainly positive reviews, receiving critical acclaim from various publications. The aggregate review site Metacritic assigned an average score of 89 to the album based on 5 reviews, indicating "Universal Acclaim". Spin Magazine's Christopher R. Weingarten labeled Waking Season as "the Best Post-Rock Album of the Year". Similarly, Riley Breckenridge of Alternative Press proclaimed "Waking Season is arguably one of the best records of 2012" citing the album as "fucking gorgeous".

=== Chart performance ===
Chart	Peak position
Billboard Heatseekers Albums	71

== Track listing ==
All songs written and composed by Chris Friedrich, Philip Jamieson, Calvin Joss, Erin Moran and Joe Vickers of Caspian.

No.	Title	Length
1.	"Waking Season"	5:21
2.	"Procellous"	6:13
3.	"Gone in Bloom and Bough"	10:24
4.	"Halls of the Summer"	5:15
5.	"Akiko"	3:33
6.	"High Lonesome"	3:37
7.	"Hickory '54"	6:04
8.	"Long the Desert Mile"	6:10
9.	"Collider in Blue"	2:34
10.	"Fire Made Flesh"	7:49
Total length:		57:00

== Personnel ==
Waking Season album personnel adapted from Allmusic.

Caspian

- Philip Jamieson - Guitar, Keyboards, Synthesizers
- Chris Friedrich - Bass
- Calvin Joss - Guitar
- Erin Burke-Moran - Guitar
- Joe Vickers - Drums

Production

- Matt Bayles - Engineer, Mixing, Producer
- Will Benoit - Additional Production, Engineer
- Ed Brooks - Mastering
- Joe Tooley - Engineer

Artwork

- Philip Jamieson - Art Direction, Design, Photography
- Charles Bergquist - Cover Image
