= An Evening at Elmwood =

Australian post-hardcore/screamo band

An Evening at Elmwood were an Australian screamo / post-hardcore band from Perth, Western Australia formed in January 2007. The band's most notable line-up consisted of Steve Caniglia (screams), Jamie Mallinder formerly Calabrese (vocals, guitar), Michael Chewter (drums, percussion), John Horner (bass), Colyn Prater (guitar) and Ben Broadley (guitar). An Evening at Elmwood released a demo and 2 Independent Releases, An Evening at Elmwood (demo), released in 2007, Can You Keep A Secret in 2007 which propelled the band to the top unsigned artist on MySpace Music for 7 consecutive months, and Learn To Breathe in 2008 which was released shortly before disbanding. The band were known for energetic, explosive performances in addition to humorous antics on and off the stage. "this six-piece band with two vocalists managed not to get hurt while working the stage despite the throwing around of guitars, body parts and a backflip".

The band received radio airplay on various radio stations including Triple J, were featured in Blunt Magazine and had sponsorships from American clothing labels, Glamour Kills Clothing and Pyknic Clothing.

== History ==
=== Formation and early releases (2007) ===
An Evening at Elmwood were formed in Perth by Chris Shalley, John Horner, Robert Livings, Rhys Dixon and Jamie Mallinder.

In 2006, An Evening at Elmwood released a three-track self-titled demo. At the time there were 5 members. Shortly after vocalists Robert Livings & Chris Shalley departed the band, resulting in Jamie Mallinder dropping guitar for vocals then Ben Broadley and Colyn Prater joining the band on guitar. Steven Caniglia then joined the band and that's when everything fell into place. Later that year, An Evening at Elmwood released their debut release Can You Keep A Secret independently. After the release of the EP they toured with He Is Legend and supported Elora Danan, Anime Fire, The Amity Affliction, Remain Opposed, Sydonia, The Rivalry and Angelas Dish.

The same year the band won a spot on the Taste of Chaos Tour by a landslide crowd vote with Frontier Touring. This provided the band with large exposure and the chance to share the stage with notable artists The Used, Rise Against, Aiden, Drop Dead Gorgeous, The Bled, Gallows and Carpathian. Following the tour the band enjoyed sellout headlining shows and media interest before the departure of drummer Rhys Dixon. After auditions Michael Chewter was appointed the band's new drummer.

=== Learn to Breathe (2008) ===
The band released Learn To Breathe in 2008 to sellout crowds on a release tour. The album artwork was designed by Joe Whyte (AFI, Alkaline Trio, Behind Crimson Eyes, I Killed The Prom Queen) who was provided a copy of the record and developed a theme based on the sound. Following its release the band gained widespread popularity and were awarded a place on the Soundwave Festival, where they played with Saosin, Alexisonfire, Cartel, The Offspring, Incubus, As I Lay Dying, City and Colour, Thursday, Killswitch Engage, Motion City Soundtrack, Bleeding Through, All Time Low, Sugarcult and more. Shortly after the success of Soundwave Festival, the band were included on the Vans Boys of Summer tour with Silverstein, Set Your Goals and Elora Danan in addition to tour supports with The Amity Affliction, Elora Danan, Anime Fire, Angelas Dish, Calerway.

The band finished the year by performing at the Hyper Festival, performing with Shihad, Birds of Tokyo, The Getaway Plan and Muph and Plutonic before Jamie Mallinder left the band to move to the UK. Unable to replace the lead vocalist and songwriter, the band decided to break-up early 2009. Several members of the band went on to form or join other bands including in League who were signed to American Label inVogue Records, Game Over Reset, Hooks4Hands, Danger! Earthquake! and Know Your Knot.

== Band members ==
Past Members

- Jamie Mallinder – vocals (2006–2008), guitar (2006–2007); acoustic guitar (2007–2008); Songwriter (2006–2008)
- Steve Caniglia – vocals (2007–2009), Lyricist (2007–2009)
- John Horner – Bass guitar (2006–2009)
- Rhys Dixon – drums, percussion (2006–2008)
- Rob Livings – Vocals (2006)
- Chris Shalley – Vocals (2006)
- Ben Broadley – Guitar (2007–2009)
- Colyn Prater – Guitar (2007–2009)
- Michael Chewter – drums, percussion (2008–2009)

== Discography ==
Demo's and Independent Releases

- An Evening at Elmwood (2006)
- Can You Keep A Secret (2007)
- Learn to Breathe (2008)

== Music videos ==
Official Music Videos

- This is going to get worse before it gets better (2008)
