= In the Room Up There =

Studio album by Elora Danan
- Released: 6 March 2009
- Genre: Post-hardcore; Punk rock Rock
- Length: 51:00
- Label: Boomtown
- Producer: Adam Spark

Elora Danan chronology
We All Have Secrets (2007)	In the Room Up There (2009)

In the Room Up There is the debut studio album by the Australian rock band Elora Danan, released through Boomtown Records on 6 March 2009. It was their first and only full-length album, before breaking up later in 2009.

The band spent months writing and recording the album, which was produced by Birds of Tokyo guitarist Adam Spark.

"Door, Up, Elevator" was the album's first single, and proved to be a breakthrough hit on the Australian radio station Triple J. Frontman George Green explained the song's meaning by saying it is

"inspired by elevator music, and the etiquette that goes on in elevators. I am fascinated by the fact that when people step into an elevator they no longer talk to each other, and they stare at the floor. As soon as people step into a machine, they become machines themselves, so the song is about the human to machine paradox."

— George Green, FasterLouder

The album's second single, "The Greater Good" also went to radio.

Green credits their sound to a love of 1980s era music; "We went back into the musical past and got a lot of inspiration from the '80s, which was probably the best era of music ever. We love the electro-synth proggy era of the '80s, so the album has a lot of similarities to 1980's bands like The Cure, New Order, The Galvatrons and Van She. The last two are probably the best bands ever to come out of the '80s and possibly the history of the universe."

Following the release of the album, they announced their first national headline tour, which took place in April and May 2009. They then toured in support of The Getaway Plan, which was the final tour for each of them.

A review by the alternative rock website AbsolutePunk rated the album at 81% and said "this album will have you thinking about it, repeating its lyrics over in your head and deriving your own meaning from it. Its individuality gives it a life which will not die soon, and I believe that to be an integral part of a great album."

== Track listing ==
All songs written and composed by Elora Danan.

1. "Man of Science" — 3:05
2. "Door, Up, Elevator" — 3:02
3. "Live Together, Die Alone" — 7:06
4. "Sinking, Always Sinking" — 4:41
5. "Ankle Deep" — 3:21
6. "We Could Be More Than This" — 6:50
7. "Ten Bucks Says It's Metaphor" — 6:05
8. "The Greater Good" — 4:09
9. "Motion Without Meaning" — 4:11
10. "Holding Our Heads in Our Hands" — 3:18
11. "Man of Faith" — 5:35
