= Bānhūs =

Studio album by Eleventh He Reaches London
- Released: 4 October 2013
- Recorded: 2009 – 2013 at Studio Sleepwalker's Dread
- Genre: Post-hardcore, progressive rock
- Length: 44:58
- Label: Hobbledehoy Records
- Producer: Eleventh He Reaches London, Ron Pollard

Eleventh He Reaches London chronology
Hollow Be My Name (2009)	Bānhūs (2013)

Bānhūs is the third studio album by the Australian post-hardcore band Eleventh He Reaches London. The name "Bānhūs" comes from the Old English word meaning ‘body’, literally translating as ‘bone-house’. It was released by Hobbledehoy Records in October 2013 with pre-orders being sent out in late September of the same year. The album is notably different from the band's other work as it takes a much darker, somber form.

An outtake from the album, dubbed "Scorpion Entertainment Owes Us $1,000", was released in November 2016 as part of the Hobbledehoy Records compilation album, "Ten Years (Thank You)".

== Track listing ==
All music written by Eleventh He Reaches London, lyrics by Ian Lenton.

No.	Title	Length
1.	"The Dragging Cloud"	8:44
2.	"Code Entwined"	7:10
3.	"Body Unbind"	5:27
4.	"No Funeral"	8:42
5.	"Veil"	1:59
6.	"Glass Harmonium"	6:03
7.	"To Whomever"	6:53

== Personnel ==
- Ian Lenton – vocals, electric guitar
- Jayden Worts – electric guitar
- Jeremy Martin – electric guitar
- Luke Pollard – bass guitar
- Mark Donaldson – drums, percussion
- Ron Pollard – vocals, piano, synthesizer
- Simon Struthers – mastering
