= Constants (band) =

American rock band

- Origin: Boston, Massachusetts; United States
- Genres: Shoegazing, post-hardcore, post-rock, space rock, indie rock
- Years active: 2003–present
- Labels: The Mylene Sheath; Radar Recordings; Make My Day Records; Science Of Silence Records; Stiff Slack Records; Vega Vinyl
- Members: Rob Motes; Orion Wainer; Joel Reynolds; Will Benoit
- Past members: Jon Hassell; Duncan Rich; Ben Fowlie
- Website: constantsound.com

Constants is an American post-rock / shoegaze band from Boston, Massachusetts, United States.

== History ==
=== (2004) Nostalgia for the Future ===
Constants was originally formed as a three piece in 2003, consisting of Will Benoit, Ben Fowlie, and Duncan Rich. Their first album Nostalgia for the Future, was produced by Daryl Rabidoux (The Cancer conspiracy) with production assistance by multi-platinum producer Matt Squire. After the release of "Nostalgia for the Future" on Radar Recordings in 2004, Fowlie left the band to found The Camden International Film Festival, and was replaced by bassist Orion Wainer in 2005.

=== (2006) The Murder of Tom Fitzgerril ===
The band self-produced their follow up EP The Murder of Tom Fitzgerril and began touring in a 66-passenger bus converted to run on waste vegetable oil. Joined on the road by guitarist Jon Hassell (ex-Seneca), the band toured for 10 months straight in 2006, and became a strong proponent of sustainability and green touring. Constants was spotlighted in newspapers and on TV news programs nationwide for their veggie oil fueled 10-month tour. Originally, the album was released in limited hand numbered sleeves with metallic inks, and was later repressed and re-released in a jewel box.

In 2007, Duncan Rich left Constants to pursue a business degree and founded the booking agency Bunce Booking, while Jon Hassell joined the band full-time. Rob Motes (ex-Coma Recovery) moved to Boston from Albuquerque, NM to take over on drums. After releasing a split 7-inch with Caspian in the Spring of 2008, guitarist Jon Hassell left to focus on film-making in Brooklyn, NY, and the band has carried on as a trio since.

The Murder of Tom Fitzgerril was released on CD by Radar Recordings, and on vinyl by Vega Vinyl on June 20, 2008, on 180 gram vinyl in a gatefold jacket.

=== (2009) The Foundation, The Machine, The Ascension ===
The band released a three album set in June 2009 on three different labels worldwide. The albums "The Foundation", "The Machine", and "The Ascension" were released by The Mylene Sheath on 3xLP in the United States, by Make My Day Records in Europe, and Sliff Slack Records in Japan. The Stiff Slack release includes alternate artwork and remixes by Justin K. Broadrick of Jesu and Philip Jamieson of Caspian.

=== (2010) If Tomorrow The War ===
Basic tracks for If Tomorrow The War were recorded at guitarist / vocalist Will Benoit's studio (Radar Studios) – a barn built in 1776 that has been updated and runs on solar energy – in January 2010. The album was produced and mixed by Justin K Broadrick (Jesu, Godflesh) and features guest vocal appearances by Andrew Neufeld (Comeback Kid, Sights & Sounds) and Mike Hill (Tombs). The album was released on vinyl with limited, hand printed artwork created by Interrobang Letterpress via Science of Silence Records in the US, and is also available with artwork from M. Repasch-Nieves (Radar Visual) in a gatefold LP / CD from Make My Day Records in Europe. In Japan, the album is available featuring two additional remixes by the band from Stiff Slack Records.

=== (2012) Pasiflora ===
On May 30, 2012, it was announced that Constants' fifth studio album titled Pasiflora has been set to be released on July 24, 2012, through Mylene Sheath Records. The album was described by Will Benoit as shoegaze, and "full of really dreamy songwriting".

== Band members ==
- Rob Motes – drums
- Orion Wainer – bass
- Joel Reynolds – guitar
- Will Benoit – guitar, vocals, electronics

=== Past members ===
- Jon Hassell – guitar
- Duncan Rich – drums
- Ben Fowlie – bass

== Discography ==
=== Albums ===
- Nostalgia for the Future – (CD/LP, Radar Recordings, 2004)
- The Foundation, The Machine, The Ascension – (The Mylene Sheath, 2009)
- If Tomorrow The War – (CD/LP, Science Of Silence Records, 2010)
- Pasiflora – (The Mylene Sheath, 2012)
- Devotion – (self-released, 2020)

=== EPs ===
- The Murder of Tom Fitzgerril – (CD, Radar Recordings, 2006; LP, Vega Vinyl, 2008)

=== Splits ===
- Split 7-inch with Caspian – (Radar Recordings, 2008)

=== Tribute albums ===
- Songs of Farewell and Departure: A Tribute To HUM (Pop Up Records, 2011)
