= Pasiflora =

- Artwork Design by Michael Repasch-Nieves

Studio album by Constants
- Released: July 24, 2012 (CD); August 21, 2012 (Vinyl)
- Recorded: Radar Studios
- Genre: Shoegaze, indie rock
- Length: 37:57
- Label: The Mylene Sheath (CD, LP) (Sheath039)
- Producer: Will Benoit

Constants chronology
If Tomorrow The War (2010)	Pasiflora (2012)

Professional ratings
Review scores
Source	Rating
Consequence of Sound	2/5 stars
Decoy Music	4/5 stars
PopBlerd!	(A)
Spin	7/10 stars

Pasiflora is the fourth full-length studio album by American rock band Constants. The album was released on July 24, 2012, through The Mylene Sheath in CD and digital download formats. A limited edition vinyl pressing of the album will be made available on August 21, 2012, through The Mylene Sheath as well. The album was recorded at Radar Studios using solar energy.

== History ==
On March 1, 2012, the album's opening track "Sunrise" was made available for streaming on MTV Hive.

On May 30, 2012, the album's release date, cover art, and track listing were revealed.

On July 19, 2012, an official music video for the album track "Passenger" premiered on Alternative Press.

On July 24, 2012, the album was released in CD and digital download formats. The entire album was also made available for streaming on the band's Bandcamp profile.

== Track listing ==
No.	Title	Length
1.	"Sunrise"	5:04
2.	"Hourglass"	3:46
3.	"Passenger"	3:44
4.	"Mourning"	5:05
5.	"Beautiful"	3:16
6.	"Pressure"	4:12
7.	"Sunset"	1:04
8.	"Austere"	3:52
9.	"1985"	3:23
10.	"Crosses"	4:31
Total length:		37:57

== Personnel ==
- Will Benoit – vocals, guitar, production, mixing
- Orion Wainer – bass
- Rob Motes – drums
- Daryl Rabidoux – co-mixing
- Michael Repasch-Nieves/ Radar Visual – artwork design
