= Arash "AJ" Maddah =

Australian music promoter

A.J Maddah is an Australian music promoter, who was the founder of Soundwave and Harvest Music Festival. He was also involved with the Big Day Out, the Australian Warped Tour and was the director of the Billy Hyde Stage Systems. In 2013, he was named as the most powerful person in the Australian music industry by the Australian Music Industry Directory.

On 4 December 2015 American Express filed a bankruptcy case against Maddah in the Federal Court of Australia. The case was filed prior to the cancellation of Soundwave Festival 2016.

In 2016 Maddah said he's "lost everything" since the end of Soundwave.
