= The Four Trees =

Studio album by Caspian
- Released: April 10, 2007
- Recorded: 2006
- Genre: Post-rock, post-metal, ambient
- Length: 60:16
- Label: The Mylene Sheath
- Producer: Caspian

Caspian chronology
The Four Trees (2007)	Tertia (2009)

Professional ratings
Review scores
Source	Rating
Sputnikmusic	4/5 stars
AllMusic	3.5/5 stars

The Four Trees is the debut studio album by Caspian. It was released on Dopamine Records on April 10, 2007 and reissued by The Mylene Sheath on March 13, 2010. The album has been released in CD and double LP format, with an out-of-print limited edition.

== Track listing ==
No.	Title	Length
1.	"Moksha"	9:08
2.	"Some Are White Light"	5:26
3.	"Sea Lawn"	5:23
4.	"Crawlspace"	7:38
5.	"Book IX"	5:44
6.	"The Dropsonde"	2:05
7.	"Brombie"	5:58
8.	"Our Breath in Winter"	3:23
9.	"The Dove"	3:05
10.	"ASA"	7:17
11.	"...Reprise"	5:14

== Personnel ==
Caspian

- Philip Jamieson – guitar, keyboards
- Calvin Joss – guitar
- Chris Friedrich – bass
- Joe Vickers – drums

Production

- Ethan Dussault – engineering, mixing
- Nick Zampiello – mastering
- Anthony Falcetta – art and design
- N. Shumaker – layout assistance
