= If Tomorrow The War =

Studio album by Constants
- Released: September 7, 2010
- Recorded: Radar Studios
- Genres: indie rock, post hardcore, post rock, progressive rock
- Length: 37:50
- Labels: Science Of Silence Records, Makemyday Records
- Producer: Justin K. Broadrick

Constants chronology
The Foundation, The Machine, The Ascension (2009)	If Tomorrow The War (2010)	Pasiflora (2012)

If Tomorrow The War is the third full-length studio album by American rock band Constants. The album was released on September 7, 2010 through Science Of Silence Records (US) and Makemyday Records (worldwide). If Tomorrow The War was later released in a limited edition vinyl format through Interrobang Letterpress with alternate artwork designed by M. Repasch Nieves.

== Reception ==
Professional ratings
Review scores
Source	Rating
Decoy Music	4/5 stars
Exclaim!	(favorable)

== Track listing ==
All tracks are written by Constants.

No.	Title	Length
1.	"Your Daughter's Eyes"	4:30
2.	"The Sun, The Earth"	4:54
3.	"Maya Ruin"	3:26
4.	"In Dreams"	4:42
5.	"A Quiet Edifice"	4:11
6.	"Spider in White"	5:20
7.	"Halloween in New Orleans"	4:03
8.	"The Three Stigmata of Palmer Eldritch"	6:44
Total length:		37:50

== Personnel ==
- Will Benoit – vocals, guitar
- Orion Wainer – bass
- Rob Motes – drums
- Justin K. Broadrick – production
- Mike Hill – guest vocals on tracks 6 and 8
- Comeback Kid – guest vocals on track 2
