= Tertulla =

Tertulla is an ancient Roman nickname for the female cognomen Tertia. Tertia in Latin means "the third daughter". Women with the name include:

- Tertulla (wife of Crassus), wife of Marcus Licinius Crassus, the richest man in Rome
- Arrecina Tertulla, once wife of the future Emperor Titus
- Julia Tertulla, wife of Roman Senator Lucius Julius Marinus Caecilius Simplex
- Atilia Caucidia Tertulla, wife of Roman Senator Appius Annius Trebonius Gallus
- Junia Tertia, often called just "Tertulla", a daughter of Julius Caesar's favorite mistress Servilia
