= Hollow Be My Name =

Studio album by Eleventh He Reaches London
- Released: March 21, 2009
- Recorded: 2007–2008 at Bergerk! Studios
- Genre: Post-hardcore, progressive rock
- Length: 59:56
- Label: Hobbledehoy Records; Good Cop Bad Cop
- Producer: Eleventh He Reaches London

Eleventh He Reaches London chronology
The Good Fight For Harmony (2005)	Hollow Be My Name (2009)	Bānhūs (2013)

Hollow Be My Name is the second album by the Australian post-hardcore band Eleventh He Reaches London. It was released by Good Cop Bad Cop in March, 2009.

Thematically, the album is dark and introspective.

It's about blaming anybody else other than yourself for your own misery. Themes like God, government and father, blaming them for your own problems. There's a definite story in the album. It's not all in order, it's a bit jumbled. It's not necessarily the same protagonist throughout the whole album, but the stories are definitely linked.

— Jeremy Martin

== Track listing ==
All music written by Eleventh He Reaches London, lyrics by Ian Lenton.

No.	Title	Length
1.	"Hollow Be My Name"	5:49
2.	"Britain And Structure"	4:50
3.	"I Am The Bearer, I Stand in Need"	9:32
4.	"Son, You're Almost An Orphan"	3:38
5.	"Oh, Brother"	5:14
6.	"Gaze to the North"	2:14
7.	"Toorali"	5:10
8.	"Hill Of Grace"	3:36
9.	"Girt By Piss"	6:12
10.	"Death Is My Holiday"	2:38
11.	"For The Commonwealth and the Queen"	11:03

Vinyl Bonus Track

No.	Title	Length
12.	"The Slough"	4:42

== Personnel ==
- Ian Lenton – vocals, electric guitar, banjo, percussion
- Jayden Worts – electric guitar, acoustic guitar, vocals, synthesizer, percussion
- Jeremy Martin – electric guitar, acoustic guitar, vocals, keys
- Craig McElhinney – bass guitar
- Mark Donaldson – drums
- Seldon Hunt – artwork
- Al Smith – mixing, mastering
- Mike Wilson – photograph
