= On Circles =

Studio album by Caspian
- Released: January 24, 2020
- Length: 46:16
- Label: Triple Crown

Caspian chronology
Dust and Disquiet (2015)	On Circles (2020)

Singles from On Circles
- 1. "Flowers of Light" Released: November 14, 2019

Professional ratings
Aggregate scores
Source	Rating
Metacritic	71/100
Review scores
Source	Rating
AllMusic	4/5 stars
Under the Radar	7/10

On Circles is the fifth studio album by American band Caspian. It was released on January 24, 2020 through Triple Crown Records.

The first single from the album "Flowers of Light" was released on November 14, 2019.

== Critical reception ==
On Circles was met with generally favorable reviews from critics. At Metacritic, which assigns a weighted average rating out of 100 to reviews from mainstream publications, this release received an average score of 71, based on 4 reviews.

== Track listing ==
On Circles track listing
No.	Title	Length
1.	"Wildblood"	6:53
2.	"Flowers of Light"	5:01
3.	"Nostalgist"	5:56
4.	"Division Blues"	7:01
5.	"Onsra"	4:46
6.	"Collapser"	4:25
7.	"Ishmael"	7:59
8.	"Circles on Circles"	4:15
