= The Foundation, The Machine, The Ascension =

- Album artwork by Ira Bronson

Studio album by Constants
- Released: July 14, 2009
- Genre: Art rock, Space rock, Post hardcore, Post rock
- Length: 58:01
- Label: The Mylene Sheath (CD/LP) (Sheath014)
- Producer: Will Benoit

Constants chronology
The Murder of Tom Fitzgerril (2006)	The Foundation, The Machine, The Ascension (2009)	If Tomorrow The War (2010)

Professional ratings
Review scores
Source	Rating
Allmusic	3.5/5 stars
Blogcritics.org	(mixed)
Crustcake	8/10 stars
Decoy Music	4/5 stars

The Foundation, The Machine, The Ascension is the second studio album by American post rock band Constants. It was released in 2009 in CD and 3LP format.

== Track listing ==
1. "Genetics Like Chess Pieces" – 5:56
2. "Damien" – 3:43
3. "Those Who Came Before Pt. I" – 6:19
4. "Those Who Came Before Pt. II" – 4:02
5. "The Nameless" – 6:16
6. "The Timeless" – 4:29
7. "Identity of Indiscernibles" – 4:30
8. "Eternal Reoccurrence" – 3:21
9. "Abraxas Pt. I" – 5:56
10. "Abraxas Pt. II" – 4:54
11. "Ascension" – 2:23
12. "...Passage" – 6:12

== Personnel ==
- Will Benoit – guitar, vocals, programming
- Rob Motes – drums
- Orion Wainer – bass
