= Tertia (album) =

Studio album by Caspian
- Released: August 11, 2009
- Recorded: February 2009
- Genre: Post-rock, indie rock, emo
- Length: 57:45
- Label: The Mylene Sheath
- Producer: Ethan Dussault

Caspian chronology
The Four Trees (2007)	Tertia (2009)	Waking Season (2012)

Professional ratings
Review scores
Source	Rating
Rock Sound	(8/10)
The Washington Post	(favorable)
Tiny Mix Tapes	2.5/5 stars
PopMatters	8/10 stars

Tertia is the second full-length studio album by the American post-rock band Caspian, released through The Mylene Sheath digitally on August 11, 2009, and physically on September 15, 2009. It is the band's first album to be released on The Mylene Sheath, after previously issuing the vinyl versions of The Four Trees and You Are the Conductor via the company.

Tertia was made available as a full free download on the same day as its digital release, through Gimme Sound. All that was required of the user was registration to the website. The money raised through advertising on the site went to the band, or charities chosen by the band, the site or the user. The album is no longer available for download as of November 2, but may still be streamed for free.

Caspian spent two weeks recording Tertia in February 2009. The album was produced by Ethan Dussault with assistance from Ed Llerena at New Alliance in Cambridge, Massachusetts. Nick Zampiello mastered the recording along with Rob Gonella at New Alliance East. Nate Shumaker (who worked on You Are the Conductor) and PAJ returned on design duties for the project.

== Track listing ==
1. "Mie" - 4:08
2. "La Cerva" - 5:00
3. "Ghosts of the Garden City" - 7:32
4. "Malacoda" - 5:02
5. "Epochs in Dmaj" - 3:25
6. "Of Foam and Wave" - 6:14
7. "Concrescence" - 4:24
8. "The Raven" - 7:00
9. "Vienna" - 5:54
10. "Sycamore" - 9:06
