= We All Have Secrets =

EP by Elora Danan
- Released: 18 August 2007
- Genre: Post-hardcore; Alternative rock
- Length: 25:48
- Label: Boomtown

Elora Danan chronology
Demo 2006 (2006)	We All Have Secrets (2007)	In The Room Up There (2009)

We All Have Secrets is the debut release and first extended play (EP) by the Australian rock band Elora Danan, released through Boomtown Records on 18 August 2007.

The last track, "Thank God For Their Growth in Faith and Love" is a revised version of the song "Stop It, Stop Breathing" from the band's 2006 demo.

Each song is written about a movie. In the lyric booklet there are different colour letters to spell out what movie the song is about.

== Track listing ==
1. "Who Are You? Stop Writing In My Diary!!!" - 3:58 (Identity)
2. "Check Your Smile" - 4:28 (One Hour Photo)
3. "A Place To Be Somebody" - 6:03 (Fight Club)
4. "Parallel Universe" - 5:11 (The Beach)
5. "...,,," - 1:03
6. "Before The Blackout" - 4:28 (The Butterfly Effect)
7. "Thank God For Their Growth In Faith And Love" - 6:46 (The Others)
