= Elora Danan (band) =

Australian alternative rock band

- Origin: Perth, Western Australia
- Genres: Alternative rock, post-hardcore, progressive rock
- Years active: 2006–2009
- Label: Boomtown
- Past members: George Green; Isaac Kara; Ryan Smith; Tim Marley; Matt Thomas; Jay Rendle O’Shea

Elora Danan were an Australian alternative rock band from Perth, Western Australia, formed in late 2006 from various other bands in the local scene who had ended including As A Weapon and Alleged. They took their name from a baby character in the 1988 film Willow.

The band's first release was an extended play (EP) entitled We All Have Secrets in 2007. They then followed up with their debut studio album in 2009, In the Room Up There. The band split up later in 2009.

== History ==
=== Early years (2006) ===
The band's first recordings were some early demos, simply titled "Demo 2006". The release featured two songs, "Stop It, Stop Breathing", and "I Feel Like Saying More". The second song was featured on a Boomtown sampler, and the first song was later re-recorded.

=== We All Have Secrets (2007) ===
After recording the demo in late 2006 the band signed to Boomtown Records, releasing their first official record, the EP We All Have Secrets in mid-2007. The song "Stop It, Stop Breathing" from the demo was reborn as "Thank God For Their Growth In Faith And Love" on the EP, with the only differences being a piano outro at the end of "Thank God...", making it almost two minutes longer than the original version. All other songs on the EP were based on films.

=== In the Room Up There (2008-2009) ===
In mid-2008 the band recorded their first and only studio album titled In the Room Up There. The album was released 6 March 2009 and was produced by Adam Spark, guitarist/producer of Birds of Tokyo. Around the time of this recording the band became a six-piece with the addition of guitarist Tim Marley. The recording was finished in August 2008; however, there was an eight-month delay in its release.

The label didn't want to put anything out between October and February because they are so business minded, and that is when the big internationals are doing their Christmas releases and they didn't want to compete. To us it was, like, instead of looking at it as competition, our music is written now and relevant now to us. The waiting was bad but I guess it made the release more exciting.

— Isaac Kara, 2009

Given the delays in the release of the album, Elora Danan have decided not to further the relationship with Boomtown Records.

We won't be releasing on Boomtown again, but they don't know that yet. A record label does not exist without bands, so they need to treat their bands well.

— Isaac Kara, 2009

The band have played many shows with big bands in their short time of formation including local favorites and international bands including The Getaway Plan, In Fiction, Behind Crimson Eyes, Unwritten Law, Sprung Monkey, New Found Glory and Saosin. The band also played on the local spot at the Soundwave festival in 2009, alongside Nine Inch Nails, Alice in Chains, Bloodhound Gang, The Subways and Underoath.

=== Breakup ===
On 29 May 2009, Elora Danan announced on its MySpace page that they would be disbanding. In an interview with FasterLouder, the band revealed their disapproval of their record label, Boomtown Records, giving a piece of advice to other bands after their experiences; saying "Don’t sign with Boomtown Records!". In an earlier interview when asked if Boomtown were treating them well, frontman George Green told the website, "Fuck no. Those guys have been making us fold all of The Getaway Plan's washing and doing their homework." The band also spoke of the economic problems they faced as a small band, "We owe a lot of money to a lot of people". They were even forced to sell clothing through MySpace to get by. The band explained the breakup by simply stating "these guys just don’t want to be in the band anymore" and "its better this way because everyone likes each other more now."

== Members ==
=== Final line-up ===
- George Green - vocals
- Isaac Kara - guitar, vocals, piano
- Ryan Smith - guitar
- Tim Marley - guitar
- Matt Thomas - bass
- Jay Rendle O’Shea - drums

=== Former members ===
- Caleb Baker - drums

=== New bands after Elora Danan ===
- George Green now fronts a new band, Sleepwalker.
- Other former members of Elora Danan have moved on to play in several new groups including Robutthole, Arms Like Branches, Eunuch Schools and Into The Sea.

== Discography ==
=== Studio albums ===
- In the Room Up There (2009)

=== Extended plays ===
- We All Have Secrets (2007)

=== Singles ===
- "Door, Up, Elevator" (2008)
- "The Greater Good" (2009)

=== Demos ===
Demo 2006

- "Stop It, Stop Breathing"
- "I Feel Like Saying More"
