= Caspian (band) =

American post-rock band

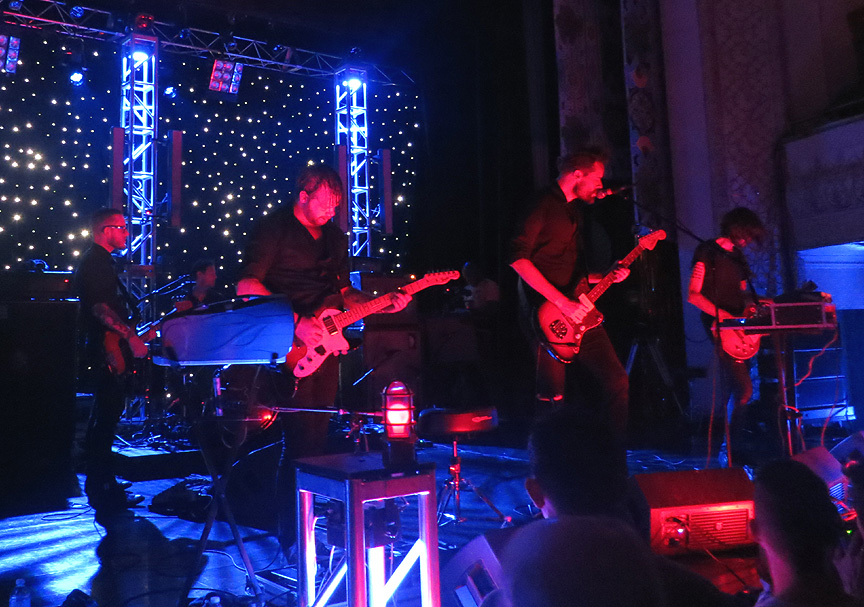
- Caspian in 2014

Background information
- Origin: Beverly, Massachusetts, United States
- Genres: Post-rock, indie rock, instrumental rock, post-metal
- Years active: 2004–present
- Labels: Dopamine; Radar; The Mylene Sheath; Make My Day Records; Triple Crown; Hobbledehoy; Big Scary Monsters
- Members: Philip Jamieson; Calvin Joss; Justin Forrest; Jonny Ashburn; Jani Zubkovs
- Past members: Chris Friedrich; Jon McMahan; Erin Burke-Moran; Joe Vickers
- Website: www.caspian.band

Caspian is an American post-rock band from Beverly, Massachusetts, United States.

== History ==
=== Early history: 2003–2004 ===
Caspian loosely formed in Autumn of 2003 in Beverly, Massachusetts, developing material through the first year of its existence, recording a demo in May 2004 and performing a small number of shows in late 2004 and early 2005, including support for the Japanese post-rock band Mono. The band's first performance took place at The Pickled Onion in Beverly, Massachusetts on August 26, 2004. At the time, the band had not yet chosen the name Caspian and was looking for a vocalist.

=== You Are the Conductor: 2005–2006 ===
In January 2005, the band signed with Dopamine Records, releasing a debut EP, You Are the Conductor in November 2005. This was followed, in January 2006, with the band's first tour of the Northeast comprising four dates in New York, D.C. and Pittsburgh. In April and May 2006, the band embarked on its first full tour of the US, reaching to the west coast and back. A hand pressed, limited edition tour EP was released by the band in September 2006 on their second full tour of the United States.

=== The Four Trees: 2007–2008 ===
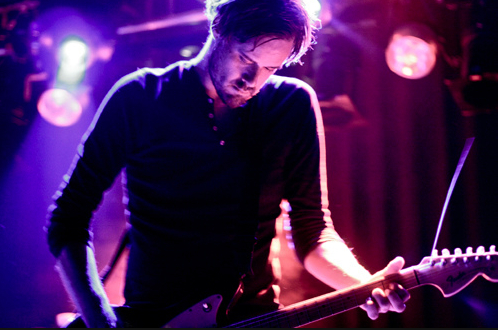
Caspian guitarist Philip Jamieson performing in 013 Tilburg, Netherlands, 2009

Over the course of 2006, the band developed material for a debut album, recording with Ethan Dussault again in August 2006 in Cambridge, Massachusetts at the newly renovated New Alliance Audio. Released on Dopamine Records on April 10, 2007, their debut album, The Four Trees, continued their positive exposure to a growing underground of post-Rock fans. The album was re-released in Europe by Make My Day Records in July 2008. Later that year, they recorded a split 7-inch with fellow Massachusetts band Constants.

Once again Caspian embarked on a three-month-long coast to coast tour of the United States to support the release. After learning that founding member, guitarist Calvin Joss, could no longer fulfill touring duties, Erin Burke-Moran of The Fly-Agaris Sky, was initially recruited to tour in place of Joss, but became a full-time member immediately following their 2007 Spring U.S. Tour. Joss remains an active member of the band and will perform live with the band when scheduling permits.

=== Tertia: 2009–2011 ===
Now officially a 5-piece band, Caspian released a follow-up to their debut called Tertia in Europe on 7 August 2009 and in the US on 15 September 2009. Caspian once again recorded the album in February 2007 at New Alliance Audio with Ethan Dussault.

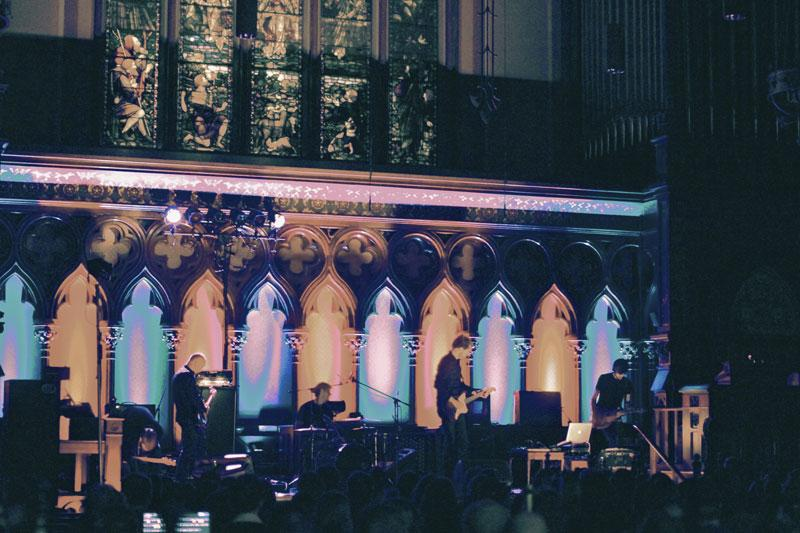
Caspian performing at Old South Church in Boston, Massachusetts, October 2010

To tour the album upon its release, Caspian enlisted Washington DC area guitarist, Jonny Ashburn, and Austin, TX bassist, Jon McMahan to assist. Tertia was supported by two massive European tours (Fall of 2009 and Spring 2010) and a two-month North American tour (March/April 2010) that included opening for Red Sparowes and Fang Island. In July 2010, the band played their first ever shows in China. The two-date "Asian Tour" was July 16 at the Hidden Agenda Live House and the second was on July 17 in Guangzhou, as part of the Qiangyuan Music Festival. The band toured the U.S. in September and October with their October 22 show at the Old South Church in Boston. The show was recorded, and highlights were released on an EP titled Live at the Old South Church in January 2012. The tour continued to Europe in November and December playing support with God is an Astronaut. In 2010, the band performed close to 150 concerts in 33 countries on 3 continents. The band played their final concert of 2010 at the Middle East Downstairs in Cambridge as part of the "Last Night on Earth", the eighth of the series, with Constants, Irepress and Moving Mountains.

=== Waking Season: 2011–2014 ===
In a band blog update in early January 2011, the band said that most of their time over the next year would be spent writing and recording their 3rd full-length album. They performed at the 2011 SXSW Music Festival in Austin, Texas and played an 8-day European tour in April 2011 visiting Russia, Germany, Poland, and the Netherlands including a headline performance at the Dunk!Festival in Zottegem, Belgium.

During the summer of 2011, Caspian refrained from live performances and focused exclusively on writing new material. The band enlisted the services of Matt Bayles to co-produce, engineer, and mix the record, which was recorded at Q Division Studios in Somerville, MA in January 2012 for 3 weeks. Additional recording and production occurred in February 2012 at Radar Studios in Clinton, CT. The album was mixed at Red Room Studios in Seattle by Matt Bayles with the band for 10 days in May, 2012. On July 9, 2012, the band announced that the album title would be Waking Season. The release date was later confirmed to be September 21, 2012, sold via Triple Crown Records. A week before the album's U.S. release, Spin.com posted a full stream of the album and called it "The Post Rock Album of the Year".

The band played a few shows before starting a 16-show-run in support of Minus the Bear and Cursive. Upon completion of that string of dates, Caspian headed to Europe touring from October 10 through November 20, and completed a full U.S. headline tour in February and March 2013 with support from Junius and Native.

On May 26, the band opened up day two of the first Boston Calling Music Festival at the Boston City Hall Plaza. The band played a short and spirited set and it also marked the first time the band played with six members on stage. The band followed up the outdoor show with a free concert in Beverly on July 13.

On August 28, 2013, the band announced via Facebook that bassist Chris Friedrich had died. He was 32 years old.

On August 31, 2013, Caspian performed a benefit show at the Engine Room in Manchester, NH, which had been arranged by Friedrich in support of a close friend in need of a double lung transplant. Previous touring member Jon McMahan and close friend of the band, Jani Zubkovs, filled in on bass for the performance. Following the show, Zubkovs would commit to becoming a full time member of Caspian.

For much of the month of October 2013 the band supported HIM on a European tour. They subsequently returned to the U.S. for a string of dates with 65daysofstatic as co-headliners.

During this tour, the band announced the release of a new EP, entitled Hymn for the Greatest Generation, containing three new songs, as well as a demo and two remixes of songs from Waking Season. Pitchfork began to stream the title track on October 9, 2013, prior to the EP's release on November 11, 2013. Hymn for the Greatest Generation was the final recording on which bassist Chris Friedrich appeared, though it was released after his death.

The album Waking Season was later given an Australia and New Zealand release through Hobbledehoy Record Co. in January 2014.

In March 2014, the band did two shows before departing for a tour of Asia and Australia. The 14-show-tour had the band playing shows in the Philippines, Singapore, six shows in China, Taiwan, and a five shows in Australia.

=== Dust and Disquiet: 2015–2017 ===
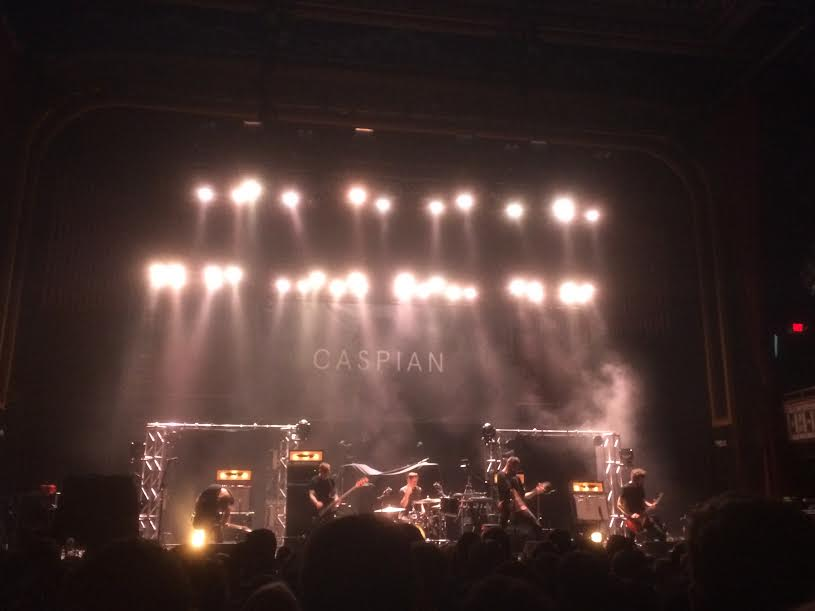
Caspian performing at the Tabernacle in Atlanta, Georgia, on April 23, 2016

In June 2015, Caspian released a 10th anniversary concert film, Live From the Larcom, recorded at the historic Larcom Theatre in their hometown of Beverly, Massachusetts in October 2014. The release was followed by a free screening of the film at the Cabot Theater.

The band began work on their fourth LP in March and April, and began hosting "listening parties" where paying fans were given iPods loaded with tracks from the album and invited to listen and discuss the record. The band also hosted additional parties in Europe in April and May 2015. On June 26, Noisey premiered the first single, "Sad Heart of Mine", off the upcoming record, titled Dust & Disquiet. On September 13, 2015, the band appeared on "Boston Emissions", a radio program airing on WZLX. All six members were in studio for the interview and a number of the new songs were played from the forthcoming record. Dust & Disquiet was released worldwide on September 25, 2015. Along with the single, the band announced U.S. and Canada tour dates for the fall, 2015. The album was the first from the band to include vocals.

On October 20, the band released a short film that was accompanied by a new song, "Castles High, Marble Bright". Alongside the video, the band announced its plan to release the track via "8 Inch". On October 22, the band hit the road in North America once more. The 22 date tour started in Washington DC at the Rock and Roll Hotel and ended on November 19 a Bar Le Ritz, in Montreal, Canada. All shows featured The Appleseed Cast. On the November 1, 2016 stop of the tour, the band was recorded performing live at the Teragram Ballroom in Los Angeles to be later featured on Last Call with Carson Daly. The segment aired on November 15 in the U.S. and it featured "Sad Heart of Mine" as well as a shortened version of "Arcs of Command" in the latter part of the program. This was the band's first appearance on late night television. The band appeared for a second time on the show in February 2017. Recorded at the same venue, the second airing of the show had an abridged performance of "Castles High, Marble Bright".

On 18, February 2017, the band played their first show in Mexico. The band was part of the "Forever Alone Festival" that took place at Foro Indie Rocks in Mexico City. The band was then slated to support Katatonia on their 28-city-tour. The tour opened in Washington D.C. on March 16, and concluded on April 22 when both bands appeared at the New England Metal and Hardcore Festival in Worcester MA. No sooner did the band complete the tour with Katatonia when they played two additional shows in China. On April 29, they played the Strawberry Festival in Shanghai and then on May 1, for a headline show at Modern Sky Lab in Beijing.

=== Touring and On Circles: 2018–2021 ===
In May 2019, Caspian announced they were headed to the studio to record their next record. In a social media post, the band indicated they would be working there for the rest of the month. The initial recording was completed in late-May 2019. On June 11, 2019, longtime friend and collaborator, Justin Forrest, became the new drummer. Forrest had been touring with the band since 2018.

On Circles was released January 24, 2020.

On March 25, 2020, many of the band members were involved with a Q+A on Reddit and answered over 250 unique questions. Pairing up with Audiotree, who had filmed the Cabot Theater show, the band did a 24-hour "ticketed" stream of the show on 30 September 2020. Fans that bought "virtual tickets" were provided a code and a 24-hour window to watch the show as often as they'd like. Prior to the first airing (and during), Jamieson, Ashburn and Zubkovs were all part of the live chat with fans. The band wanted the event to "feel like an actual concert", having said there is no plan to release the show other than this one-off event. The following day, Jamieson and Burke-Moran did an Instagram Live session to further engage fans.

The album, On Circles, was nominated for the "Best Recording Package" Grammy Award. Jordan Butcher was the art director for the album. The demos for On Circles were released via Bandcamp for just a 24-hour period in May, 2021.

=== Departure of Erin Burke-Moran and future performances end of 2022 ===
In the summer of 2021, guitarist Erin Burke-Moran announced his departure from the band. Caspian performed two gigs at The Sinclair, in Cambridge, MA on 30 September and 1 October. Guitarist Calvin Joss performed the Burke-Moran guitar sections. They had a few shows in the US in November where they opened for Murder By Death twice and were supported by Holy Fawn twice.

A few weeks after the short tour Wrapped guitarist Phillip Jamieson announced a "Covers" album, aptly titled "Covers Vol. 1." The 8 track collection was uploaded to his Bandcamp page and Jamieson noted: %100 of all proceeds will be donated to the Petey Greene Program (PGP), a Massachusetts organization that recruits volunteers to support the academic goals of incarcerated and formerly incarcerated people.

In April 2022, the band played two shows in support of the Converge collaboration "Bloodmoon". June 2022 saw the band do a quick North American run of shows (6 total) with Arms and Sleepers as support. On the final night of the tour during the bands soundcheck the venue had electrical issues. The band was moved to another venue last minute, wrapping up the tour with no further concerns. The band had a larger European run of shows (approx. 17) over the summer of 2022.

=== 2023 and 2024, 20th Anniversary ===
In 2023, The band announced via social media two concerts in the US to support Defeater. On 21st, June the band announced the release of "On Circles: The Complete Sessions", a deluxe 2LP limited to 1500 copies and containing three new tracks.

In late November/early December the band headed to Asia for about two weeks worth of shows. The tour was billed along with the band Envy.

2024 marked the 20th anniversary for the band. Although no full-length releases were announced, they did headline at the Post Festival in Indianapolis, Indiana USA in July. They later toured with And So I Watch You From Afar before performing at the ArcTanGent Festival on 17 August.

On 29, November the band celebrated their 20th Anniversary with a home town show at the Cabot Theater. The 13 song set ran just shy of 120 minutes and featured the return of former members Joe Vickers, (who played on Loft) and Erin Burke Moran who performed on "Rioseco". Both guys, as well as Jon McMahon, who played guitar during "Sycamore" re-joined the band to complete the main set with "Sycamore". During the set, Calvin Joss performed a solo acoustic piece called "CMF", a homage to their former bassist Chris Friedrich. During the performance a lone spotlight shone on a bass owned by Friedrich.

=== 2025 ===
The band posted a few images and clips from a studio in the early summer. The band noted it was great to be back at it, but could not confirm anything outside of getting together and getting some song ideas down.

On 21 November the band was announced as a headliner for the Dunk!Festival which is held in Zottegem, Belgium, in May 2026.

The band performed it's lone show US show, and first in 366 days, to a sold out crowd at Sonia in Cambridge Massachusetts on the 30th of November. The band performed a 70 minute set and debuted a new song near the end of the set. The working title of the song is "Burnt Reynolds".

After the Cambridge show the band departed to Australia for three shows in December, visiting Brisbane, Melbourne and Sydney.

=== 2026, Self Titled Album #6 ===
A few still images and short Instagram video clips appeared in February showing the band at work in a recording studio. By April 2026 many band members were posting to their own social media pages updates from the studio. The studio sessions appear to be about two weeks in length. With regard to live shows in 2026, the band did play the Portland House of Music in Portland Maine on Thursday the 7th of May and about a week later (15th May) performed at the Dunk! Festival in Zottegem, Belgium. During the festival set the band noted a new album was complete and they have plans to release in October. The band made its second appearance at Post Festival on 23rd June in Indianapolis, Indiana USA.

On 3rd September 2026 the band posted via socials 10-16-26. An ambient clip played on Instagram, and the band updated their profile picture and banner photo on Facebook. The song was later identified as the first single from the album called "Remain".

On 10, September a new song "Remain" was posted online. This was the same music that appeared in the Instagram post. At 11am ET the same day a "visualizer" version of the video premiered on YouTube. Along with the video premiere announcement many things were confirmed. The band was now with Wax Bodgea, an indie label based out of Philadelphia PA and Brett Romnes of I Am the Avalanche is listed as a producer. Track listing: 1. Hiraeth 2. Far Country 3. Remain 4. A Great Fire 5 No One Left to Tell 6. Waltz for the End

September 30th the band announced via social media the next single was going to be released on October 7, 2026. "Far Country", a song the band had been gigging out since late 2025 with working titles such as "Burnt Reynolds" and "Perkins".

Beginning on 15th October and running until 31st October the band performed in Europe with And So I Watch You from Afar. The tour had a show cancelled in Paris due to issues at the border. The band also had to swap out their tour bus early in the tour, but spirits remained high and reports from fans in attendance were overwhelmingly supportive.

Two additional US dates were added on the 3rd of December in Brooklyn NY at Saint Vitus and 4th December at the Paradise in Boston.

On 14th October the band held a listening party for the new album on their bandcamp page. Confirmed band members in chat answering questions were Jonny and Phil. The band did mention they were awaiting a ferry with tour mates and So I Watch You from Afar The album was played in full just one time.

On October 16, 2026 the self titled sixth album was released The album cover is from an 1875 fire in Boston, Massachusetts.

== Members ==
Current

- Philip Jamieson – guitar, keyboards, synthesizers (2004–present)
- Calvin Joss – guitar, pedal steel guitar (2004–present)
- Jonny Ashburn – guitar (August 2009–present)
- Jani Zubkovs – bass (2013–present)
- Justin Forrest – drums (2018–present)

Former

- Chris Friedrich – bass (2004–2013; his death)
- Jon McMahan – bass (touring only, August 2009—Oct 2022)
- Joe Vickers – drums (2004–2018)
- Erin Burke-Moran – guitar (May 2007 – 2021)

Timeline

== Discography ==
=== Studio albums ===
- The Four Trees (2007)
- Tertia (2009)
- Waking Season (2012)
- Dust and Disquiet (2015)
- On Circles (2020)
- Caspian (2026)

=== Other releases ===
- You Are the Conductor (2005)
- Tour EP (2006)
- Split with Constants (2008)
- Live at Old South Church (2012)
- Hymn for the Greatest Generation (2013)
- Castles High, Marble Bright (2016)
- On Circles: The Demos (2021)
- On Circles: The Complete Sessions (2023)

== See also ==
- List of post-rock bands
