= Blueline Medic =

Australian rock band

- Origin: Melbourne, Victoria, Australia
- Genres: Rock, indie rock
- Years active: 1999–2009 (Reunions: 2010, 2011, 2013–2014, 2017)
- Labels: Fueled by Ramen; Hobbledehoy Record Co. Redline Records; Casadeldisco Records
- Past members: Donnie Dureau; Adrian Lombardi; Dave Snow; Shaun Lohar; Lachlan Hodgson
- Website: bluelinemedic.bandcamp.com

Blueline Medic were an Australian rock band from Melbourne.

== History ==
The group formed in mid-1999 after the downfall of bands Caustic Soda and Mid Youth Crisis from which guitarists Donnie Dureau and Adrian Lombardi were members. In forming the initial lineup they were joined on bass by Dave Snow, formerly of The Bradshaw Figure, and Lachlan Hodgson, who drummed for Caustic Soda, and recorded their first EP, A Working Title in Green, released on Sony.

Shortly after the release, Hodgson left the band and they were dropped by Sony. Shaun Lohoar (who has also played in a number of Melbourne-based bands, most notably Pollyanna) was recruited as the new drummer.

After being signed by Fueled by Ramen (who then licensed their albums to Redline Records for release in Australia), the band released their debut album, The Apology Wars in 2001. The album included the lead single "Making the Nouveau Riche" which was voted into the No. 68 position in the Triple J Hottest 100, 2001. Subsequent releases have included a 12 track compilation with Midtown, The Movielife and Secondbest, their second album Text Bomb in 2003 and a 6-track split EP in 2005 with Ted Leo and the Pharmacists (who subsequently supported Blueline Medic on an Australian tour) on Casadeldisco Records. 2007 saw the release of their third album 42:19.

In 2008, Blueline Medic joined Melbourne label Hobbledehoy Record Co. and released The Middle of the End 7", whom later released 42:19 on vinyl and the CD format (outside of Australia).

Their last show before breaking up for the first time was in January 2009, in Brisbane. For this show, Donnie and Adrian played an acoustic set. In July 2010, they played their first show in 18 months at their "spiritual home" at The Arthouse, Melbourne.

On New Year's Eve 2011/2012, the band played an unannounced 4 song set (with fill-in drummer Chris Cowburn from Loser).

On 13 September 2013, the band played at The Reverence Hotel as part of the Poison City Weekender. The band also played with Bodyjar on a national tour in 2014.

== Discography ==
=== Albums ===
- The Apology Wars (16 July 2001) - Fueled By Ramen / Redline
- Text Bomb (21 March 2003) - Fueled By Ramen / Redline
- 42:19 (21 April 2007) - Casadeldisco Records

=== EPs and singles ===
- A Working Title in Green (August 2000) - Sony / Fueled By Ramen
- New. Old. Rare. Split with Secondbest, Midtown and The Movielife (US Edition has Recover in place of The Movielife and Secondbest credited as Silent*Corporation) (30 September 2002) - Fueled By Ramen / Redline
- Sleepyhead (24 February 2003) - Redline
- Split EP with Ted Leo and the Pharmacists (28 February 2005) - Casadeldisco
- The Middle of the End 7" Vinyl (8 July 2008) - Hobbledehoy
