= Eleventh He Reaches London =

Australian post-hardcore band

- Also known as: Our Lasting Loss
- Origin: Perth, Western Australia, Australia
- Genre: Post-hardcore
- Years active: 1999–2016
- Labels: Good Cop Bad Cop; Hobbledehoy
- Past members: Mark Donaldson; Ian Lenton; Alex Lucas; Jayden Worts; Brad Rowland; Jeremy Martin; Craig McElhinney; Luke Pollard

Eleventh He Reaches London were an Australian five-piece post-hardcore band formed in December 1999 in Perth as Our Lasting Loss. They changed their name in late 2002 and released three studio albums, The Good Fight for Harmony (December 2005), Hollow Be My Name (March 2009) and Bānhūs (October 2013). They disbanded in 2016.

== History ==
=== 1999-2004: Formation ===
Eleventh He Reaches London started in December 1999 as the quartet, Our Lasting Loss, with Mark Donaldson on drums, Ian Lenton on lead vocals and guitar, Alex Lucas on bass guitar and Jayden Worts on lead guitar; all were aged 17.

In 2001 their track, "You Left Me at the Crossroads Like Val Kilmer in Willow", appeared on a various artists' compilation album, Left of Centre 2. It was recorded with Allen Smith producing, at Bergerk! Studios, and mixed and mastered by Rob Swire of Pendulum. Shortly after Lucas left the band and was replaced by Brad Rowland on bass guitar.

They changed their name in late 2002, which comes from an epic poem, Don Juan, by Lord Byron: in its eleventh chapter, the protagonist reaches London. In late 2003 the band released its first extended play, Diving for Treacher. Smith produced, mixed and mastered the three-track EP, their line-up changed again with Craig McElhinney replacing Rowland and the addition of Jeremy Martin, as their third guitarist, adding a new dimension to its sound.

During 2004 Eleventh He Reaches London played supported other artists, Against Me!, Shai Hulud and The Nation Blue. In October of that year they completed four shows in Melbourne. Martin described the group's style in December 2005:

Collectively, we listen to a very diverse range of music, and I think our music reflects this. We all like many of the same artists, but each of us have quite different tastes. All of us enjoy listening to and creating music that is dramatic, and that creates a strong sense of mood... We don't fit neatly into any one scene within Perth, and we are more than happy about this. While some may see it as a disadvantage, for us it means we have the pleasure of performing alongside artists playing a diverse range of styles. Playing with the same bands and to the same crowd week in, week out tends to get tedious, and removes any element of surprise a gig may have. It removes the challenge of attempting to win over punters that haven't seen or heard you before.

=== 2005-2007: The Good Fight for Harmony ===
In early 2005, the band returned to Bergerk! Studios with Allen Smith to record their first studio album. The group performed at the West Australian Music Industry Awards Festival and RTRFM's In the Pines, as well as being the only main stage support act on the Perth leg of Taste of Chaos, where they performed to a sold-out Robinson Pavilion with the Used, Killswitch Engage, Funeral for a Friend, Story of the Year and Rise Against. After six months in the recording studio, with the album mastered by Shaun O'Callaghan at Studio Couch, The Good Fight for Harmony was released on 14 December 2005. It reached the top of the local charts, almost selling out of its first pressing within a month and a half. "Say You See Why So" received airplay on Triple J and local radio.

In 2006 Eleventh He Reaches London started writing for a second album. The band performed as part of the WAMi Festival and won its first WAMi Award (for 'Favourite Newcomer'). The band completed a short Western Australia tour with Gyroscope, supported Les Savy Fav, returned to Melbourne to promote The Good Fight For Harmony, and also supported Coheed and Cambria on their first Australian tour. In 2007, they band played support for Converge, ISIS and Funeral for a Friend on the Perth leg of their respective Australian tours and won a second WAMi Award ('Best Hardcore/Punk Act'). The band received a grant from the Department of Culture and Arts (Western Australia) to assist in the production of the second album.

=== 2008-2011 : Hollow be my Name ===
In 2008 Eleventh He Reaches London released the lead track (on-line), "For the Commonwealth and the Queen", ahead of their second album, Hollow be my Name.

In June that year, bass guitarist McElhinney left the band to pursue a solo project and explore other musical interests. The band signed with Good Cop Bad Cop Records in July 2008, which re-released The Good Fight for Harmony on 16 August 2008. As a result of delay in the band's second album due to line-up changes (with a February 2009 release date) their new record label released a 7" single, "Girt by Piss", on 25 October 2008. Also in October, the band introduced its replacement for McElhinney, Luke Pollard, and undertook a national tour in support of the new single. The B-side of the single, "Hill of Grace", was nominated for the 2008 WAM Song of the Year competition.

The band's second album, Hollow Be My Name, was released on 28 March 2009 on Good Cop Bad Cop Records. Thematically, the album is dark and introspective; Martin explained:

It's about blaming anybody else other than yourself for your own misery. Themes like God, government and father, blaming them for your own problems. There's a definite story in the album. It's not all in order, it's a bit jumbled. It's not necessarily the same protagonist throughout the whole album, but the stories are definitely linked.

— Jeremy Martin

=== 2012-2016: Bānhūs and disbandment ===
In April 2012 the band joined Hobbledehoy Record Co. for vinyl reissues of their previous material.

Their third album, Bānhūs, was released through that label on 4 October 2013. The group disbanded in 2016.

== Members ==
- Mark Donaldson – drums (1999–2016)
- Ian Lenton – lead vocals, guitar (1999–2016)
- Alex Lucas – bass guitar (1999–2001)
- Jayden Worts – lead guitar (1999–2016)
- Brad Rowland – bass guitar (2001–03)
- Jeremy Martin – lead guitar (2003–16)
- Craig McElhinney – bass guitar (2003–08)
- Luke Pollard – bass guitar (2008–16)

== Discography ==
=== Studio albums ===
Title	Details
The Good Fight for Harmony	Released: 2005; Label: Eleventh He Reaches London (EHRL001); Format: CD, digital download, LP
Hollow Be My Name	Released: March 2009; Label: Eleventh He Reaches London (EHRL001); Format: CD, digital download, LP
Bānhūs	Released: October 2013; Label: Hobbledehoy (HOB 026); Format: CD, digital download, LP

== Awards and nominations ==
=== WAM Song of the Year ===
The WAM Song of the Year was formed by the Western Australian Rock Music Industry Association Inc. (WARMIA) in 1985, with its main aim to develop and run annual awards recognising achievements within the music industry in Western Australia.

Year	Nominee / work	Award	Result (wins only)
2013	"Body Unbind"	Rock Song of the Year	Won

=== West Australian Music Awards ===
The West Australian Music Industry Awards (WAMIs) are annual awards presented to the local contemporary music industry, put on annually by the Western Australian Music Industry Association Inc (WAM).

Year	Nominee / work	Award	Result
2006	Eleventh He Reaches London	Favourite Newcomer	Won
2007	Eleventh He Reaches London	Best Hardcore/Punk Act	Won
2010	Eleventh He Reaches London	Best Hard Rock / Metal Act	Won
2011	Eleventh He Reaches London	Best Hard Rock / Metal Act	Won
