= Hobbledehoy Record Co. =

Australian independent record label

- Founded: 2006
- Founder: Tom Majerczak
- Distributor: MGM (AUS/NZ) Cobraside (Rest of World)
- Genre: Indie
- Country of origin: Australia
- Location: Adelaide
- Official website: http://www.hobbledehoyrecords.com

Hobbledehoy Record Co. (/ˈhɒbəldihɔɪ/ HOB-əl-dee-hoy) is an artistic-centric independent record label in Adelaide, Australia. Founded by Tom Majerczak while he was attending university in Melbourne, the label has released notable recordings by Blueline Medic, Owen, Arrows, This Will Destroy You and others.

== Discography ==
(Arranged by date of release)

- Oh Messy Life – 1+1−1=1 – HOB001 (CD, 2006)
- Oh Messy Life – The Literature EP – HOB002 (CD, 2006)
- The City on Film – In Formal Introduction – HOB004 (CD, 2007)
- The Leap Year – With A Little Push A Pattern Appears – HOB005 (CD, 2007)
- Blueline Medic – The Middle Of The End – HOB003 (7", 2008)
- Hey Mercedes – Unorchestrated – HOB006 (LP 12", 2008)
- Arrows / These Hands Could Separate The Sky – Split – HOB007 (CD, 2008)
- Arrows – Modern Art & Politics – HOB008 (CD, 2008)
- Blueline Medic – 42:19 – HOB009 (LP, 2009)
- Blueline Medic – 42:19 – HOB009 (CD, 2009)
- Owen – At Home With Owen – HOB011 (CD, 2009)
- Owen – New Leaves – HOB012 (CD, 2009)
- Jamie Hay – Thieves – HOB010 (7", 2010)
- Arrows – Try and Stay Upright – HOB013 (LP, 2010)
- Arrows – Try and Stay Upright – HOB013 (CD, 2010)
- Arrows – Modern Art & Politics – HOB008 (2xLP, 2011)
- The Leap Year – "With A Little Push A Pattern Appears" – HOB005 (LP, 2011)
- This Will Destroy You – Tunnel Blanket – HOB015 (2xLP, 2011)
- This Will Destroy You – Tunnel Blanket – HOB015 (CD, 2011)
- Braid – Closer To Closed – HOB016 (LP 12", 2011)
- Owen – Ghost Town – HOB017 (LP, 2011)
- Lymbyc Systym – Shutter Release – HOB014 (LP, 2012)
- Eleventh He Reaches London – The Good Fight For Harmony (Remaster) – HOB018 (LP, 2012)
- Arrows / Empire! Empire! (I Was a Lonely Estate) – Split – HOB019 (7", 2012)
- Jamie Hay – King Of The Sun – HOB020 (LP, 2012)
- Jamie Hay – King Of The Sun – HOB020 (CD, 2012)
- Fourteen Nights At Sea– Untitled – HOB021 (CD, 2012)
- Charge Group – Escaping Mankind – HOB022 (LP, 2013)
- Fourteen Nights At Sea– Great North – HOB023 (LP, 2013)
- Fourteen Nights At Sea– Great North – HOB023 (CD, 2013)
- Eleventh He Reaches London – Hollow Be My Name (Remaster) – HOB024 (2xLP, 2013)
- Owen – L’Ami du Peuple – HOB025 (LP, 2013)
- Eleventh He Reaches London – Bānhūs – HOB026 (LP, 2013)
- Eleventh He Reaches London – Bānhūs – HOB026 (CD, 2013)
- The Leap Year – "The Narrowing" – HOB027 (LP, 2013)
- Ceres – "Luck" – HOB028 (LP 12", 2014)
- Caspian – Waking Season – HOB029 (2LP, 2014)
- Ceres – I Don't Want To Be Anywhere But Here – HOB030 (LP, 2014)
- Ceres – I Don't Want To Be Anywhere But Here – HOB030 (CD, 2014)
- Kevin Devine – Bubblegum – HOB031 (LP, 2014)
- Kevin Devine – Bulldozer – HOB032 (LP, 2014)
- Ceres – Selfish Prick – HOB033 (7", 2014)
- This Will Destroy You – Another Language – HOB034 (2xLP, 2014)
- This Will Destroy You – Another Language – HOB034 (CD, 2014)
- Luke Howard – Two & One – HOB035 (LP, 2015)
- Codes in the Clouds - Codes in the Clouds - HOB 053 (LP, 2019)

== See also ==
- List of record labels
