= Step Up (Angelas Dish album) =

Compilation album by Angelas Dish
- Released: 24 January 2009
- Recorded: 2003–2006
- Genre: Indie pop
- Label: Boomtown

Angelas Dish chronology
War on Time (2008)	Step Up (2009)	Walk Into the Sky (2010)

Step Up is the first compilation album from the Australian indie pop band Angelas Dish, released through Boomtown Records Shock Distribution on 24 January 2009.

In January 2009 it was announced that Angelas Dish's former record label, Boomtown Records, would be releasing the retrospective CD including the band's older material. The album features 18 tracks, incorporating the three out of print releases from before their debut album, the Lie Die, My Body Is an Ashtray and self-titled EPs, along with two previously unreleased tracks.

== Track listing ==
1. "On a sign"
2. "Televise"
3. "Lights Out"
4. "Save Me"
5. "Remember You"
6. "The Light On"
7. "Step Up" (hidden track on Lie Die - album booklet reveals the title of this song as "Step Up")
8. "When I'm Gone"
9. "My Screaming Heart"
10. "Lock You Out"
11. "Just a Game"
12. "Engine Stalled"
13. "Clear"
14. "Rollercoaster"
15. "Nightmare"
16. "Closer Friends"
17. "Exploding Bottle of Pain"
18. "Diesel"
- Tracks 1–7 are from Lie Die (2005)
- Tracks 8–11 are from My Body Is an Ashtray (2006)
- Tracks 12–16 are from the self-titled EP (2003)
- Tracks 17–18 are previously unreleased

== Release history ==
Country	Date	Format	Label	Catalogue
Australia	January 2009	Digital download CD	BNM Records	BTR039
