= Young Heretics =

Australian musical group

- Origin: Melbourne, Victoria, Australia
- Genres: Doom metal, alternative metal, pop rock, indie pop
- Years active: 2009–2010
- Labels: CocoHeart (Japan); Boomtown Records (AUS)
- Past members: Kitty Hart; Matthew Wright

Young Heretics were an Australian musical duo based in Melbourne, formed in 2009. The project comprises Kitty Hart and her half-brother, The Getaway Plan frontman Matthew Wright.

After their debut release EP The Dreamers was met with acclaim from the underground music scene worldwide, the siblings followed up with their debut album titled We Are The Lost Loves seven months later. The months in-between were spent touring the country alongside Australian bands Kid Sam, Parades, Jonathan Boulet, Gin Wigmore, Bertie Blackman and Philadelphia Grand Jury.

The self-produced album was recorded with the help of Tom Larkin (of Shihad fame) at three different Melbourne studios.

More than 60 musicians and audio effects by movie maker Peter Jackson were used to create the album. The band caused a stir within the media when they decided to leak the full album for free a month before its official release.

The duo commenced their first full band tour around Australia in July 2010 in support of the album, with Comic Sans, Siren Lines and Guineafowl supporting.

In July 2010 Young Heretics signed to Japanese indie label Cocoheart Records; their album was released into stores in Japan on 22 September 2010.

Kitty Hart is a passionate animal rights activist and member of Animals Australia. Young Heretics headlined World Vegan Day 2010.

In 2011 the band went on hiatus while Matthew records the second album with the rock band The Getaway Plan, and Kitty is writing for indie folk project Magic Spells.

== Members ==
- Kitty Hart
- Matthew Wright

== Discography ==
=== Studio albums ===
- 2010: We Are The Lost Loves

Tracklist:

1. Animal War
2. The Lost Loves
3. Risk / Loss
4. Dark Prince
5. Noah's Ark
6. I Know I'm a Wolf
7. Dream Sequence
8. Bones of a Rabbit
9. 1.01001101001111
10. Come Together
11. Trapperkeeper
12. The Lost Loves (Acoustic Version)
13. Winter Makes a Sleeper

=== Extended plays ===
- 2009: The Dreamers EP

Tracklist:

1. Bones of a Rabbit
2. The Lost Loves
3. Dark Prince
4. Winter Makes a Sleeper
