= Shakedown =

Shakedown or Shake Down may refer to:

- Shakedown (continuum mechanics), a type of plastic deformation
- Shakedown (testing) or a shakedown cruise, a period of testing undergone by a ship, airplane or other craft before being declared operational
- Extortion, a criminal act of coercion or intimidation for personal gain
- A colloquial term for an inspection for contraband inside a prison
- An English term for kuzushi techniques of various Japanese martial arts, which literally means shaking down the opponent

== Music ==
- Shakedown (band), a Swiss musical project formed in 1999
- Shakedown Records, a record label founded by Red Café

=== Albums ===
- Shakedown (album), by the Freemasons, 2007
- Shake Down (album), by Savoy Brown, 1967
- Shakedown or Shake Down, another title for The Best of the Wailers, by the Wailers, 1971
- Shakedown! The Texas Tapes Revisited, by Bobby Fuller, 1996
- Shakedown! (theStart album), 2001

=== Songs ===
- "Shakedown" (Bob Seger song), 1987
- "Shake Down", by Akon from Konvicted, 2006
- "Shakedown", by Behind Crimson Eyes from A Revelation for Despair, 2006
- "Shake Down", by Billy Squier from the St. Elmo's Fire film soundtrack, 1985
- "Shakedown", by Blondie from The Curse of Blondie
- "Shakedown", by Cuban Link from Chain Reaction, 2005
- "Shake Down", by Die Warzau from Disco Rigido, 1989
- "Shakedown", by Kid Rock from Bad Reputation (Kid Rock album)
- "Shake Down", by Mary J. Blige from Growing Pains, 2007
- "Shakedown.", by ThxSoMch, 2026

== Film ==
- The Shakedown (1929 film), an American sports drama directed by William Wyler
- Shakedown (1936 film), an American crime drama directed by David Selman
- Shakedown (1950 film), an American film noir directed by Joseph Pevney
- The Shakedown (1959 film), a British crime drama directed by John Lemont
- Shakedown (1988 film), an American crime action film directed by James Glickenhaus
- Shakedown: Return of the Sontarans, a 1995 made-for-video dramatic spin-off of Doctor Who
- Shakedown (2018 film) an American documentary directed by Leilah Weinraub
- The Shakedown, a 2024 Amazon Prime Video original film

== Books ==
- Shakedown (Angel novel), a 2000 original novel based on the U.S. television series Angel
- Shakedown, the novelisation of Shakedown: Return of the Sontarans by Terrance Dicks
- Shakedown: Exposing the Real Jesse Jackson by Kenneth R. Timmerman
- Shakedown: How Our Government is Undermining Democracy in the Name of Human Rights by Ezra Levant

== Other ==
- Shakedown (Snowboard Games), rider-driven snowboard event
- Shakedown, a supervillain in DC Comics who is a member of Masters of Disaster
- Shakedown (TV series), an Australian television show based on the 2015 Centrelink robodebt scandal
