= In Fiction =

Australian rock band

- Origin: Adelaide, South Australia, Australia
- Genre: Melodic rock
- Years active: 2005–2008
- Label: Boomtown
- Members: Josh Burgan - Guitar/Vocals; Alistair Elkins - Bass; Brad Gilbertson - Vocals; Paul Heitmann - Guitar/Vocals; Tom Crosby - Drums
- Past members: Josh Mann - Guitar (2005); Tristan Stanley - Bass (2005 – Oct 2006); Steve Luscombe - Drums (2005 – May 2007); Ty Alexander - Drums (May 2007 – Nov 2007)
- Website: infiction.com.au

In Fiction were an Australian five-piece melodic rock band from Adelaide.

Having formed in 2005, In Fiction signed to Boomtown Records in 2006 with their debut release The Four Letter Failure and featured as Triple J's "Next Crop" artist as part of AusMusic Month.

The Four Letter Failure peaked at number 86 on the Australian ARIA Charts and stayed in the top 100 for five weeks.

In March 2007, the group released Ghost which peaked at number 85 on the ARIA Chart.

In Fiction frequently tour Australia with a number of bands, including The Matches, Bodyjar, Behind Crimson Eyes and Kisschasy. In Fiction also play many festival tours including the 2007 Vans Boys of Summer Tour, both the 2006 and 2007 Boomtown Showdown tours, the 2008 Adelaide Soundwave Festival and 2008 Push Over Festival.

In Fiction's debut album The Forecast was released on 7 June 2008 featuring the single "Liar Liar".

In late October 2008, the band announced that they would be breaking up indefinitely for personal reasons. As of 2009, three new incarnations of In Fiction have emerged from the previous members which are: The Afterparty (Brad), The Fountainhead (Paul, Alistair and Tom) and The Miracle is Now (Josh).

On 26 June 2010, In Fiction played a reunion show for the grand opening of a new music venue in Light Square, Adelaide.

Another reunion show was also held on 20 August 2011 at Fowlers Live.

== Discography ==
=== Albums ===
List of albums, with selected details
Title	Details
The Forecast	Released: June 2008; Format: CD; Label: Boomtown Records

=== Extended plays ===
List of EPs, with Australian chart positions
Title	EP details	Peak chart positions
Title	EP details	AUS
The Four Letter Failure	Released: August 2006; Label: Boomtown	85
Ghost	Released: March 2007; Label: Boomtown	86
