= Dark Horses (The Getaway Plan album) =

Studio album by the Getaway Plan
- Released: 3 July 2015
- Recorded: November 2014 – March 2015
- Studio: Studios in the City in Brunswick, Victoria, and Sing Sing Studios in Cremorne, Victoria
- Length: 62:31
- Label: Dope Mountain/Independent
- Producer: Samuel K Sproull

The Getaway Plan chronology
Requiem (2011)	Dark Horses (2015)

Singles from Dark Horses
- 1. "Landscapes" Released: 10 June 2015; 2. "Last Words" Released: 3 July 2015

Dark Horses is the third album by Australian alternative rock band the Getaway Plan, released on 3 July 2015.

== Background ==
On 1 November 2014, The Getaway Plan announced plans to release their third full-length record, Dark Horses. The band chose to set up a crowd-funding campaign through PledgeMusic so that they could remain independent and release the album without a record label.

Dark Horses is the first album by the Getaway Plan to be fully written and recorded in Australia. They worked alongside long-time friend and producer Sam K creating the record between November 2014 and March 2015. Dark Horses was recorded at both The Studios in the City in Brunswick and at Sing Sing Studios in Cremorne.

Dark Horses was released on 3 July 2015. The album debuted at No. 10 on the ARIA Albums Chart, marking the band's highest charting position ever in Australia with their debut LP Other Voices, Other Rooms peaking at No. 14 and their sophomore record Requiem reaching No. 17.

== Track listing ==
All lyrics written by Matthew Wright, all songs written by the Getaway Plan.

No.	Title	Length
1.	"Landscapes"	4:08
2.	"F(r)iend"	4:11
3.	"Castles in the Air"	4:49
4.	"Dark Horses"	5:39
5.	"Last Words"	4:34
6.	"Battleships"	5:18
7.	"Dreamer/Parallels" (featuring Freeds)	8:43
8.	"The Means"	5:38
9.	"Baby Bird/Effigy"	7:45
10.	"Monuments"	4:07
11.	"Exodus"	7:39
Total length:		62:31

Japanese bonus tracks
No.	Title	Length
12.	"Lovesick"	4:04
13.	"Mirrors"	3:21

== Personnel ==
- Matthew Wright – vocals, piano, guitar
- Clint Owen Ellis – guitar
- Mike Maio – bass guitar
- Dan Maio – drums, percussion

Additional personnel

- Samuel K Sproull – producer, engineer, mixer, mastering.
- Jon Grace – assistant engineer
- Chris Carmichael – strings on tracks 2, 8, 9.
- Freeds – vocals on track 7

== Charts ==
Chart (2015)	Peak position
Australian Albums (ARIA)	10
Australian Independent Records Chart (AIR Charts)	1
