= Walk Into the Sky =

- Cover photography by Eddie Mallin at monosnaps.com

Studio album by Angelas Dish
- Released: May 2010
- Studio: Allison Audio, Erina, Australia.
- Genre: Rock
- Length: 55:06
- Label: BNM Records
- Producer: Sonny Truelove and Angelas Dish

Angelas Dish chronology
Step Up (2009)	Walk Into the Sky (2010)	Me and You (2011)

Singles from Walk Into the Sky
- 1. "Rapture" Released: September 2010; 2. "Crash" Released: May 2011

Walk Into the Sky is the second studio album by Australian rock band Angelas Dish. It was released in May 2010.

Kill Your Stereo said "The album opens with the anthemic 'Redemption', a song that takes its cues from Jimmy Eat World, and is easily one of the record's highlights. The staggered drums and harmonised wails help to open the album with strength and beauty. Angelas Dish have always had a very mature style of songwriting and this seems to have been amplified once again. Songs like the shimmering 'Crash', show off the excellent production, handled by Michael Baskett, who has made a noticeable difference to the band's sound by giving it a stadium rock feel, mixed perfectly with soft rock moments." They continued saying "The vocal duties, this time shared evenly by brothers Michael and Joshua Harris, are just one of the strengths of the record, but a very important one. They take the forefront on songs like 'Rapture', which uses a mix of effects and clean sounds, as well as some truly stand out harmonies. Another highlight is 'Sorry Lately', driven by an acoustic blues riff which sounds like a brand new song that has been given the unique Dish twist, the relaxed guitar solo is just another example of the mature changes the band have implemented. The record ends with the acoustic finger-picking of 'Have You Around' which is the base for gentle delayed vocals and a recorded conversation about happiness."

== Track listing ==
No.	Title	Length
1.	"Redemption"	4:46
2.	"You Want Me to Give Up"	3:32
3.	"Crash"	3:27
4.	"Part of Me"	4:11
5.	"The Valley (Like You Said I Would)"	4:22
6.	"More Alien"	3:02
7.	"Little Light"	3:08
8.	"Rapture"	3:20
9.	"Sorry Lately"	4:50
10.	"See You in Disneyland"	3:40
11.	"Parachute"	3:37
12.	"Where Did You Go?"	7:37
13.	"Have You Around"	5:33

== Release history ==
Country	Date	Format	Label	Catalogue
Australia	May 2010	Digital download, CD	BNM Records	BNM0013
