= Mere Theory =

Australian rock band

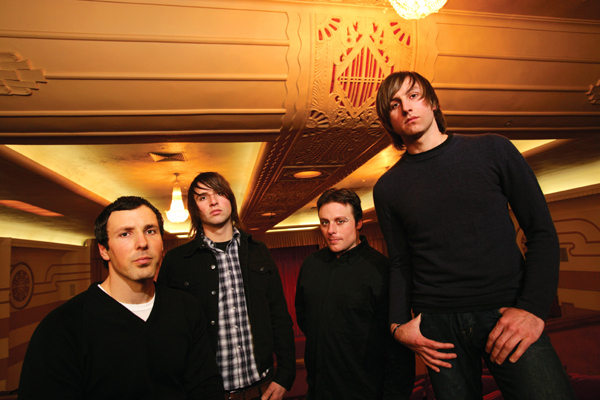

Background information
- Origin: Adelaide, South Australia, Australia
- Genres: Indie, Rock, Progressive
- Years active: 2000–2012
- Labels: Boomtown; Building
- Members: Nigel Black; Chris Mellow; Ross Simpson; David Priest
- Past members: Matt Adey; Nathan Dalton; Ryan Paterson; Richie Wise
- Website: Official website

Mere Theory were a four-piece rock band from Adelaide, Australia.

== History ==
The group formed in late 2000 out of the southern Adelaide surf/hardcore scene, and cite influences ranging from Fugazi, Boysetsfire, At the Drive-in, Cave In, and The Cure. The band started seasonally touring Australian cities from 2002. Mere Theory released their first EP Towering Sun in 2002, and their second EP Disengage in 2004, both through Building Records. They started to receive airplay on ABC's Triple J national radio station, as well as Australian community radio, with the song "Freedom in Mind" from 2004's Disengage. 2005 saw Mere Theory tour with After the Fall, and in 2006 nationally with Gyroscope. The band also played the Big Day Out in 2005, and again in 2007, as well as the Clipsal 500 After Race Concert. Mere Theory have recorded live for Triple J's "Home & Hosed," were a Triple J "Next Crop" Artist, and were listed on the Triple J Hottest 100 poll. They are SAMIA, ArtsSA, and APRA award recipients.

Mere Theory's debut full-length album, Catalan Atlas was released through Boomtown Records in 2007, and was recorded and mixed at Melbourne's Sing Sing Studios with Richard Stolz (Bodyjar, After the Fall). The track "Stabilise" received regular rotation on ABC's Triple J national radio station, with the song making the Triple J Hottest 100 polls. The album received favourable reviews from Rolling Stone: "A Mature, compelling record, and a strong contender for this year’s best album (9/10)"; and Blunt Magazine: "Mere Theory have single-handedly restored my faith in Australian rock...Catalan Atlas is truly the most impressive debut album I have heard this year (4/5)." From Catalan, the single "Gracefully" was released on 7" vinyl, and was produced as a film clip which received television play on Channel V, ABC's Rage, and JTV. An animation was created for the track "Defeating this Feeling" which received "Video Clip of the Week" on ABC television's Rage. Another video was created for the single "Break Through", which features an Adelaide Roller Derby final. The clip uses a special slow-motion camera that was once owned and used by the television show Mythbusters. The group also appeared as the Rove Live house band. In Blunt Magazine issue No. 66, Catalan Atlas was dubbed one of the "Top 100 Albums You Should've Heard in 2007." Their review went on to say "Adelaide foursome Mere Theory took a giant leap in 2007 with their debut album, Catalan Atlas. Taking all the best bits from the likes of Sunny Day Real Estate, Texas Is The Reason and Elliott, then integrating them into their own Oz punk stylings, Mere Theory came out with a rock album of international standard."

In 2007, Mere Theory set out on a national tour in support of their debut album Catalan Atlas, sharing the stage with numerous Australian acts, highlighted with good friends Blueline Medic, as well as Calling All Cars. The band supported Australian act Karnivool nationally in 2008. A third national tour in support of Catalan Atlas, the Australian Atlas Tour took place in the latter part of 2008. In 2009 the band entered Broadcast Studios to record their second album Walking in Storms. The album features group vocals and instrumentalists from some of Adelaide's known rock bands, such as "spoken" vocals from John Scott from the Mark of Cain. Recorded by Evan James (The Mark of Cain, Pharaohs), mixed by Richard Stolz (Bodyjar, After the Fall), Walking in Storms was released through MGM in 2011. Mere Theory toured Walking in Storms nationally in 2012 with friends After the Fall. The Final EP, containing unreleased tracks, was released during what would be Mere Theory's final shows.

== Live performance ==
Mere Theory toured from 2002 to 2012, playing hundreds of shows across Australia, sharing the stage with international contemporaries Millencolin, Alexisonfire, Rufio, Unwritten Law, MXPX, Anberlin, The Juliana Theory, Off Minor, Bouncing Souls, Midtown, Useless ID, Dropkick Murphys, Your Black Star, and Australian acts including Gyroscope, After the Fall, Karnivool, Frenzal Rhomb, Shihad, Bodyjar, Grinspoon, The Butterfly Effect, COG, Kisschasy, The Hot Lies, One Dollar Short, Blueline Medic, 28 Days, Antiskeptic, I Killed the Prom Queen, The Nation Blue, Trial Kennedy, The Bearded Clams, 99 Reasons Why, Thinktank, Seraphs Coal, Embodiment 12:14, Paper Arms, Grenadiers, Floating Me and Horsell Common.

== Discography ==
=== Albums ===
- Catalan Atlas (2007, Boomtown)
- Walking in Storms (2011, MGM)

=== EPs ===
- Towering Sun (2002, Building)
- Disengage (2004, Building)
- Final (2011, Independent)

=== Singles ===
- Gracefully 7" (2007, Boomtown)
