= Wishful thinking (disambiguation) =

Wishful thinking is the formation of beliefs according to what might be pleasing to imagine instead of by appealing to rationality.

Wishful Thinking may also refer to:

== Music ==
=== Performers ===
- Wishful Thinking (Australian band), a pop punk band
- Wishful Thinking (British band), a rock band

=== Albums ===
- Wishful Thinking (Earl Klugh album), 1984
- Wishful Thinking (Neck Deep album), 2014
- Wishful Thinking (Propaganda album), 1985
- Wishful Thinking, by Ed O.G., 2002

=== Songs ===
- "Wishful Thinking" (China Crisis song), 1983
- "Wishful Thinking" (Duncan Sheik song), 1998
- "Wishful Thinking" (Wynn Stewart song), 1959
- "Wishful Thinking", by 4hero from Two Pages, 1998
- "Wishful Thinking", by Alphaville from Salvation (Alphaville album), 1997
- "Wishful Thinking", by Dan Hill
- "Wishful Thinking", by the Ditty Bops from The Ditty Bops, 2004
- "Wishful Thinking", by John Petrucci from Suspended Animation, 2005
- "Wishful Thinking", by Natasha Bedingfield from Roll with Me, 2019
- "Wishful Thinkin'", by Poison from Hollyweird, 2002
- "Wishful Thinkin'", by Sly & the Family Stone from Small Talk, 1974
- "Wishful Thinkin'", by Tony Booth (a.k.a. Johnny Booth)
- "Wishful Thinking", by Travis Tritt from Ten Feet Tall and Bulletproof, 1994
- "Wishful Thinking", by Wilco from A Ghost Is Born, 2004

== Other media ==
- Wishful Thinking (1997 film), an American romantic comedy
- Wishful Thinking (2026 film), an American romantic comedy
- Wishful Thinking (book), a 1973 non-fiction book by Frederick Buechner
- "Wishful Thinking" (Captain N: The Game Master), a television episode
- "Wishful Thinking" (Supernatural), a television episode

== See also ==
- Wishful Drinking, a 2008 autobiographical book by Carrie Fisher
- Wishful Thinking About Winter, a composition by Wayne Slawson
