= Sounds Like Chicken =

Australian band

- Origin: Melbourne, Victoria, Australia
- Genres: Ska, hardcore, reggae, rock
- Years active: 1999–2007
- Label: Boomtown Records
- Members: Nyall Dawson; Nat Kitingan; Dave Powys; Natalie Parker; Joel Dawson; Ben Hobson; Mike Haydon

Sounds Like Chicken were an Australian ska band from Melbourne, which formed in 1999 and disbanded in 2007. They were one of Australia's most well-known ska bands. They were signed to Boomtown Records.

Sounds Like Chicken's musical style included a blend of ska, hardcore, reggae and rock. The band placed a high emphasis on touring and were known for their "high energy" live performances.

Sounds Like Chicken shared stages and toured with bands including Reel Big Fish, Mad Caddies, Crowned King, Hilltop Hoods, Kisschasy, Area-7, Gyroscope, Bodyjar, 28 Days, Killing Heidi, The O.C. Supertones, and Antiskeptic.

Sounds like Chicken also had rotation on the radio station Triple J, mainly with their double A-side single "Take a Bullet to the Grave"/"El Chupanebre" and their other single "Global Domination".

After their breakup, SLC released all their previous recordings under Creative Commons (by-nc-sa), for free online distribution.

The band reformed for a once-off show on 11 May 2014 as a benefit for independent record store Fist2face.

== History ==
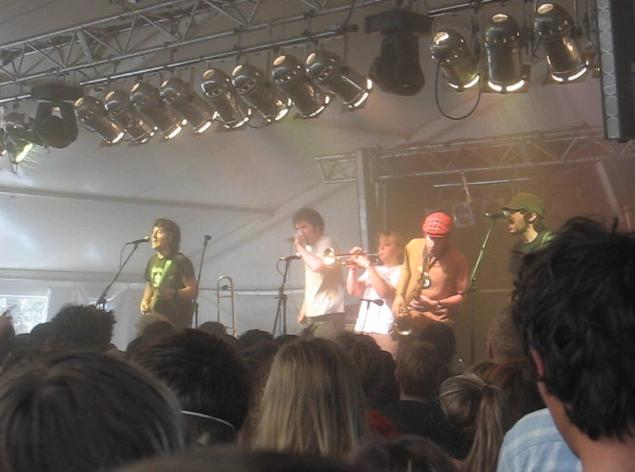
Sounds Like Chicken playing at the Blackstump Christian Musical Festival, 2006

=== Early band history ===
Sounds Like Chicken began in 1999 when Nathanael Kitingan (Nat Kitingan) met Nyall Dawson at Monash University in Melbourne. Nat and Nyall attempted to start an unnamed musical project with Hugh Ogilvy (also from Monash University) featuring Nyall on electric violin, Hugh on guitar and Nat on drums. This trio did not get off the ground and so brothers Joel and Elliot Dawson joined to form Sounds Like Chicken, a ska project taking influences from Voodoo Glow Skulls, The O.C. Supertones, The Insyderz and Five Iron Frenzy. This early lineup was Nyall (vocals), Nat (bass/vocals), Elliot (drums), Joel (sax) and Hugh (guitar).

Sounds Like Chicken's first show was at Joel's 21st birthday party in mid-2000. Hugh left the band at the end of 2000 due to other commitments and was replaced by Tom Dowding on guitar. Tom was an extremely accomplished bass player and so Nat decided to swap to playing guitar so that Tom's talent could be fully utilised. The band decided they needed another horn and so after a number of unsuccessful audition attempts, in 2001 Nat met Natalie Parker at university and invited her to a practice. Natalie was initially apprehensive but was eventually convinced by the boys to join the band. During her second practice she was already laying down trumpet tracks on their first demo recording which ended up becoming the band's self-made demo EP, Slowly Going the Way of the Chicken.

Sounds Like Chicken toured interstate for the first time under this lineup in September 2001, playing in Sydney and Canberra and also at the Black Stump Music Festival. In 2002, Tom Dowding departed from Sounds like Chicken to be replaced by Joshua Diemar on bass. It was in this year that Sounds Like Chicken released their first studio EP, I Am Gibbon, Hear Me Roar, produced by David Carr (Antiskeptic, Taxiride). The EP gave the band airplay on community radio, Christian radio, and Triple J.

=== Boomtown Records era and lineup changes ===
In early 2004, the band were signed to Boomtown Records, a Melbourne-based indie record label distributing through Shock Records and MGM. Deciding that a bigger ensemble was required, Sounds Like Chicken asked long-time friend Dave Powys (ex Staff Discount and Never in Doubt) to join on second guitar, making them a 7-piece band. Dave moved down from Canberra and recorded on the single Global Domination, their first release with Boomtown and distributed through MGM. The single received national airplay and spot airplay on Triple J and was sold out within 2 months of its limited pressing. It was noted that producer Dave Carr's production was a big step up from previous releases.

It was shortly after this that the band decided it was time to move on and the band was without a bass-player. They were booked in to record an album and so asked if Carlos Echeverria (ex Know Exit and Wishful Thinking) would fill in and record bass for them. Their first full-length album, ...Like a Cannonball to the Ocean Floor was released late that year through Boomtown, also doing well on the airwaves. The album drew acclaim from reviewers as a "brilliantly released debut album", although the length of 17 tracks drew some criticism. Sounds Like Chicken did a joint national tour with label-mates Wishful Thinking to launch the album. Carlos officially joined shortly after the album's release.

In early 2005 founding member and manager, Elliot, decided to part ways with the band. Mike "Carcass" Haydon (of Melbourne band The Knockabouts), only 17 at the time, was able to fill the role of drummer. Mike had been a tour roadie for the band for the past 3 years and so was already well-acquainted with their songs. That year Sounds Like Chicken released the second double-A side single off the album, Take a Bullet to the Grave/El Chupanebre through Boomtown Records, and completed a national tour over 3 months to launch it.

On 3 November 2006, founding member, Nyall Dawson, announced his decision to depart the band early in 2007.

Sounds Like Chicken have played and toured with numerous well-known Australian and international acts and have been featured on various international and Australian compilations and soundtracks such as Turn the Other Cheek Volume 1.

== Break up ==
On 18 December 2006 Sounds Like Chicken announced they were calling it a day in a bulletin released on the band's MySpace. The main factors in the breakup was the future departure of Nyall Dawson and other key members of the band, the band stated:

"We guess it’s time for some of us to move on. There was other plans for our lives and with the impending departure of some key members, we felt that SLC would simply not be SLC if we went on without them. We all feel at peace about this decision."

Shortly after, the band announced plans for an Australia wide farewell tour to take place in February–March 2007, along with the release of a final limited-edition compilation disk titled Death to the Crow to coincide with the tour.

Sounds Like Chicken's final show was held at TLC Bayswater, Victoria on Saturday 17 March 2007.

The band's entire discography (except for Death to the Crow) was made available for free download on their website and on Jamendo.

In April 2007, former SLC members Mike Haydon, Dave Powys, Ben Hobson, Nat Kitingan and Joel Dawson together with new addition Paul McCasker formed reggae band San Salvador. They released an EP How To Hear, two singles "Like a Train" and "Spark the Fire" and later the mini-album "Rugged Are The Mountains".

Former members Mike Haydon and Joe Ireland later joined indie band The Middle East which featured two tracks in Triple J's hottest 100 in 2010. Dave Powys also went on to join indie folk band The Paper Kites.

In 2023, former members Joel and Elliot Dawson and Nat Kitingan formed a new project called The Kittyhawks who are now one of Australia’s premier ska punk acts.

== Reunion show ==
On 31 March 2014 it was announced on the band's fan-run Facebook page that they were reforming for a once off show on 11 May 2014 as a benefit for Fist2face record store. The show was held at Ding Dong Lounge and featured supports from Antiskeptic, The Ramshackle Army, Best Before, Payoff and more. The show sold out.

== Members ==
=== Final members ===
- Natalie Parker - Trumpet/vocals
- Joel Dawson - Tenor Saxophone
- Nyall Dawson - Trombone/"Thrashcore" vocals
- Dave Powys - Guitar/vocals
- Nat Kitingan - Guitar/vocals (also played bass guitar in 1999-2000 and on tour in 2006)
- Ben Hobson - Bass guitar
- Mike Haydon (2005 - 2006) - drums

=== Past members ===
- Elliot Dawson (1999 - 2005) - Drums
- Carlos Echeverria - Bass guitar
- Josh "Ramsey" Diemar - Bass guitar
- Joe Ireland - Bass guitar (from the band Know Exit and later Goodnight Combat Fighter and currently in an indie band The Middle East, an unofficial touring member who played numerous shows with SLC around Australia in 2004–2006. The band decided posthumously to credit Joe as an official member, due to his considerable contribution to the group)
- Tom Dowding - Bass guitar
- Hugh "HOgilvy" Ogilvy - Guitar

== Discography ==
=== Singles and EPs ===
- "Slowly Going the Way of the Chicken" (2001)
- "Slowly Going the Way of the Stump" (2001)
- "I Am Gibbon, Hear Me Roar" (2002)
- "Global Domination" (2004)
- "Take a Bullet to the Grave" / "El Chupanebre" (2005)
- "Death to the Crow" (compilation) (2007)

=== Albums ===
- ...Like a Cannonball to the Ocean Floor (2004)

=== Compilation albums ===
- Turn the Other Cheek Volume 1
- Sorry If It Isn't Cool Anymore! (Mushroom Cloud Records, US)
- RP Records Showcase 03 (RP Records)
- Freerider MX (DVD Soundtrack)
- Endtime Records Compilation Volume 1 (Endtime Records)
- The Fight (DVD soundtrack)
- Boomtown Showdown 06 (Boomtown Records, Live DVD)
- Elevation 06 (96 Five FM Brisbane)
