= Horsell Common (band) =

Australian rock band

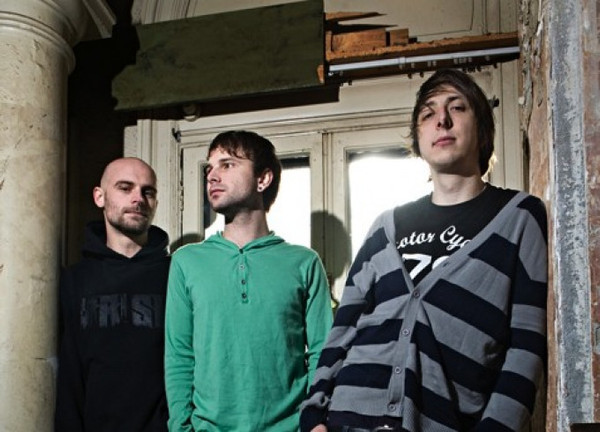

Background information
- Origin: Victoria, Australia
- Genres: Alternative rock, rock
- Years active: 2002–2008, 2010
- Labels: Boomtown Records
- Members: Mark Stewart (vocals/guitars); Luke Cripps (Bass); Leigh Pengelly (drums)
- Website: www.horsellcommon.com

Horsell Common were an Australian band from Melbourne, Victoria. They made their live debut in early 2002, following this up with a string of EPs, and released their first full-length album The Rescue on 29 September 2007. The album peaked at number 100 on the ARIA Charts.

The band is named after a substantial area of conservation land south west of London where the Martians in H.G. Wells' War of the Worlds first landed.

== History ==
=== 2002–2005: A Who's Who Road of Living & Lost a Lot of Blood ===
Horsell Common were a band made up of Mark Stewart (Vocals / Guitar), Luke Cripps (Bass) and Leigh Pengelly (Drums). The band made their live debut in early 2002, and released their debut EP A Who's Who Road of Living in September 2003. The EP featured the band's debut, limited edition 7" vinyl single of "Order".

The EP's second single "In Theory" was released with a film clip starring celebrity criminal and Australian folk hero Chopper Read, which was later banned by the ABC due to its graphic nature.

In April 2005, the band released their second EP Lost a Lot of Blood. The EP was their first for Sydney-based label Set Fire to My Home Records.

=== 2006: The Birds and the Bees &Satellite Wonderland ===
In April 2006 they released a split EP with fellow Melbourne band Trial Kennedy entitled The Birds & the Bees, on which each band recorded an acoustic cover version of their songs.

In September 2006 the band released their fourth EP, titled Satellite Wonderland, which peaked at number 57 on the ARIA Charts.

=== 2007–2008: The Rescue to hiatus ===
After completing their Satellite Wonderland tour in early 2007 Horsell Common set to work on their debut album The Rescue which was recorded at Sing Sing studios with American producer Bruce Haigler, and Engineered by Richard Stolz. The album released on 29 September 2007, and peaked at number 100 on the ARIA Charts.

The film clip for the single "Good from Afar" was filmed in the dissused ballroom at Flinders Street station in mid July. The band is following up the release of their debut album with numerous tours including the Breakout Festival 2007 in Sydney, Melbourne and Brisbane with Grinspoon, The Butterfly Effect, Little Birdy, Gyroscope and Youth Group in September 2007.

During The Rescue tour, Horsell Common commenced a competition on their Myspace page in which bands could enter their best song and Horsell Common would pick the one each state to open for them. The bands that won were; Broadway (Melbourne), Day on Fire (Adelaide), Ember Heart (Hobart), Mad Intentions (Launceston), LameExcuse (Canberra), Rex Banner (Sydney), Returns (Brisbane). The tour was also supported by Melbourne band Trial Kennedy

On 21 January 2008, Drummer Leigh Pengelly announced his parting with the band after the completion of their tour; his last appearance was at the Corner Hotel, Richmond on 5 April 2008. The band were auditioning drummers to replace Leigh but were unable to find a permanent replacement after Bodyjar's Shane Wakker filled in on tour during 2008..

=== 2010: Farewell tour and disbandment ===
On 22 December 2009 Horsell Common announced they were 'getting back together, just so we can break up again' for one final tour over 3 weekends in March 2010, with a gig in Adelaide at the Enigma Bar, Sydney at Spectrum and 2 final gigs at The Arthouse in Melbourne, a venue the band frequented early on in its existence.

Horsell Common released one final CD entitled For Laughter, For Drama, only available to people who purchased a ticket online. It is a compilation album containing 24 tracks; all of the band's releases prior to The Rescue and unreleased tracks from the Satellite Wonderland sessions.

== Discography ==
=== Studio albums ===
Title	Details	Peak chart positions
Title	Details	AUS
The Rescue	Released: September 2007; Label: Boomtown Records (BTR027); Format: CD, digital download	100

=== Compilation albums ===
Title	Details
For Laughter, For Drama	Released: May 2010; Label: Boomtown Records (BTR037); Format: CD

=== Extended plays ===
Title	Details	Peak chart positions
Title	Details	AUS
A Who's Who Road of Living	Released: September 2003; Label: Dork Records (DR04); Format: CD	-
Lost a Lot of Blood	Released: April 2005; Label: Set Fire to My Home (SFR09); Format: CD, Digital Download	-
The Birds and the Bees (with Trial Kennedy)	Released: 4 April 2006; Label: Set Fire to My Home (SFR12); Format: CD, Digital Download	-
Satellite Wonderland	Released: September 2006; Label: Boomtown Records (BTR017); Format: CD, Digital Download	57

=== Singles ===
List of singles, with Australian chart positions
Title	Year	Peak chart positions	Album
Title	Year	AUS	Album
"Order"	2003	-	A Who's Who Road of Living
"In Theory"	2003	-	A Who's Who Road of Living
"The Disaster"	2004	-	Lost a Lot of Blood
"Royal Artillery"	2006	-	Satellite Wonderland
"Good from Afar"	2007	95	The Rescue
"Sing the News"	2008	-	The Rescue
