= Journaux =

Journaux is the plural of the French word Journal, a diary or newspaper. It may also refer to:

- Journaux, nineteen volumes by Julien Green published in Paris, 1938–2001
- Journaux intimes by Charles Baudelaire (1821–1867), compiled after his death and translated into English in 1930
- Journaux (EP), a 2014 4-track EP released by Melbourne band The Getaway Plan
