= J Awards of 2009 =

Annual Australian music awards

- Date: 4 December 2009
- Venue: The Vanguard, Sydney, Australia
- Website: abc.net.au/triplej

The J Award of 2009 is the fifth annual J Awards, established by the Australian Broadcasting Corporation's youth-focused radio station Triple J. The announcement comes at the culmination of Ausmusic Month (November). In 2009, as per 2008, three awards were presented; Australian Album of the Year, Australian Music Video of the Year and Unearthed Artist of the Year. The winner were announced on 4 December 2009.

== Who's eligible? ==
Any Australian album released independently or through a record company, or sent to Triple J in consideration for airplay, is eligible for the J Award. The 2009 nominations for Australian Album of the Year and Australian Music Video of the Year were selected from releases received by Triple J between December 2008 and November 2009. For Unearthed Artist of the Year it was open to any artist from the Unearthed (talent contest), who has had a ground breaking and impactful 12 months from November 2008 and October 2008.

== Awards ==
=== Australian Album of the Year ===
Artist	Album Title	Result
Sarah Blasko	As Day Follows Night	Won
Karnivool	Sound Awake	Nominated
Hilltop Hoods	State of the Art	Nominated
Bertie Blackman	Secrets and Lies	Nominated
Kid Sam	Kid Sam	Nominated
Phrase	Clockwork	Nominated
Paul Dempsey	Everything Is True	Nominated
Philadelphia Grand Jury	Hope is for Hopers	Nominated
Oh Mercy	Privileged Woes	Nominated
Lisa Mitchell	Wonder	Nominated

Richard Kingsmill of Triple J said "It's been fantastic watching Sarah's career build over the last 7 years. We've admired the way she's carved her own niche in an industry that often supports bands more than it does solo artists. Her latest album is another solid body of work that has heard her diversify her song writing and incorporate some great new elements. She's pure class and she thoroughly deserves this award."

=== Australian Video of the Year ===
Director	Artist and Song	Result
Alex Roberts	Art vs. Science - "Parlez vous Francais?"	Won
Yanni Kronenberg and Lucinda Schreiber	Firekites - "Autumn Story"	Nominated
Sam Bennetts	Bluejuice - "Broken Leg"	Nominated
Pradeep Senanayake	Astronomy Class - "Where You At?"	Nominated
Ton Noakes	The Scare - "Could Be Bad"	Nominated
Chris Frey	Karnivool - "Set Fire To The Hive"	Nominated

Brendan Hutchens from Triple J said "There were some outstanding Australian music videos made in 2009 and narrowing down all possibilities to just six nominees was a tough ask. The Art vs Science clip 'Parlez Vous Francais' directed by Alex Roberts has a fantastic original concept, brilliant performances, perfect timing, great design elements, strong camera work and editing that all together produces an interesting relationship with the song and engages the viewer for the full 4 minute duration. It stood out as being brilliant amongst brilliance."

=== Unearthed Artist of the Year ===
Artist	Notes	Result
The Middle East	A musical collective based in Townsville.	Won
Philadelphia Grand Jury	Winners of the Sydney Big Day Out competition.	Nominated
Seth Sentry	A Melbourne hip hop artist.	Nominated
Washington	Winner of the Melbourne Big Day Out competition.	Nominated

Richard Kingsmill said "The Middle East won us and our listeners over with one simple thing - great songs. They really have a magical chemistry and it's exciting to have watched how they've progressed across 2009. Overseas interest is building and their debut album will be one of the anticipated releases of 2010. To think they were on the verge of breaking up before we spotted them on Unearthed makes us feel a little bit warm inside too."
