= Step Up =

Step Up may refer to:

== Film and television ==
- Step Up (franchise), a series of dance films and related media
  - Step Up (film), the 2006 first film in the series
  - Step Up (TV series), a 2018–2022 drama series
- Step Up (The Price Is Right), a former pricing game on the game show The Price is Right

== Music ==
=== Albums ===
- Step Up (Angelas Dish album) or the title song, 2009
- Step Up (Flamin' Groovies album) or the title song, 1991
- Step Up (Tower of Power album) or the title song, 2020
- Step Up (Original Soundtrack), or the title song by Samantha Jade, from the 2006 film

=== Songs ===
- "Step Up" (The Cheetah Girls song), 2006
- "Step Up" (Darin song), 2005
- "Step Up" (Drowning Pool song), 2004
- "Step Up", by Devo from Something for Everybody, 2010
- "Step Up", by Enter Shikari from Common Dreads, 2009
- "Step Up", by Kurupt from Tha Streetz Iz a Mutha, 1999
- "Step Up", by Linkin Park from Hybrid Theory (20th Anniversary Edition), 2020
- "Step Up", by Miss A from A Class, 2010
- "Step Up", by NCT 127 from Blingy, 2026

== Other uses ==
- Step-up converter, or boost converter, a kind of power converter
