= Hold Conversation =

EP by the Getaway Plan
- Released: 13 March 2006
- Recorded: January–February 2006
- Genre: Post-hardcore
- Length: 26:13
- Label: Boomtown
- Producer: Phil McKellar

The Getaway Plan chronology
| The Getaway Plan Demo (2005) | Hold Conversation (2006) | Other Voices, Other Rooms (2008) |

Hold Conversation is the debut EP by the Getaway Plan, released on 13 March 2006.

Tracks from the EP received airplay on Australian national youth radio station Triple J, notably the track "If The Suspense Doesn't Kill Us, Something Else Will..."

This is the last release as a five-piece: guitarist/vocalist Benny Chong departed soon after its release.

== Track listing ==
All lyrics written by Matthew Wright, all music composed by the Getaway Plan

| No. | Title | Length |
|---|---|---|
| 1. | "A Toast to the Burning Estate" | 3:52 |
| 2. | "Vesper" | 3:07 |
| 3. | "Hide Your Children!" | 4:59 |
| 4. | "The New Year" | 3:38 |
| 5. | "If the Suspense Doesn't Kill Us, Something Else Will..." | 4:53 |
| 6. | "An Afterword" | 5:44 |

Bonus tracks
| No. | Title | Length |
|---|---|---|
| 7. | "Strings" (live) | 4:20 |
| 8. | "Quarantined" (live) | 3:03 |

== Personnel ==
- Matthew Wright – Lead vocals, piano
- Clint Splattering – Lead guitar
- Benny Chong – Rhythm guitar, backing vocals
- Dave Anderson – Bass guitar
- Aaron Barnett – Drums, percussion

== Release history ==
| Region | Date | Label | Format | Catalogue |
|---|---|---|---|---|
| Australia | 13 March 2006 | Boomtown | CD, Digital download | BTR012 |
