= Journaux (EP) =

EP by The Getaway Plan
- Released: 1 September 2014
- Recorded: Melbourne, Australia
- Genre: Acoustic
- Label: Self-released
- Producer: The Getaway Plan

The Getaway Plan chronology
Lovesick/Mirrors (2013)	Journaux (2014)	'Dark Horses' (2015)

Journaux is a 4-track EP released by Melbourne band The Getaway Plan on 1 September 2014.

The EP was self-produced by the band and made available as an exclusive download as a part of their PledgeMusic campaign for their new album Dark Horses.

It contains three old songs in a stripped back format and one previously unreleased B-side.

== Track listing ==
No.	Title	Length
1.	"Phantoms (Acoustic)"
2.	"Shadows (Acoustic)"
3.	"Untitled (B-Side)"
4.	"Strings (Piano Version)"
