= Satellite Wonderland =

EP by Horsell Common
- Released: 25 September 2006
- Recorded: Studio One, Melbourne, Victoria
- Genre: Alternative rock, grunge, rock
- Length: 17:28
- Label: Boomtown Records
- Producer: Kalju Tonuma

Horsell Common chronology
The Birds and the Bees (2006)	Satellite Wonderland (2006)	The Rescue (2007)

Satellite Wonderland the fourth EP by Australian band Horsell Common. It contains 5 tracks and it was released on 25 September 2006

== Track listing ==
1. "You" – 2:52
2. "Blood & Wine" – 3:35
3. "Royal Artillery" – 2:49
4. "Stop...Don't Stop" – 3:32
5. "Satellites" – 4:48

== Charts ==
Chart (2006)	Peak position
Australia (ARIA Charts)	57

== Personnel ==
- Mark Stewart – vocals, guitar
- Luke Cripps – bass guitar
- Leigh Pengelly – drums
