= Shadows (The Getaway Plan song) =

- CD Single Cover

Single by The Getaway Plan

from the album Other Voices, Other Rooms
- Released: 2008
- Genre: Emo, alternative rock
- Length: 3:43
- Label: Boomtown Records
- Songwriters: Clint Owen Ellis, Matthew Wright, Aaron Barnett, Dave Anderson

The Getaway Plan singles chronology
"Where the City Meets the Sea" (2008)	"Shadows" (2008)

"Shadows" is the third single to be taken from The Getaway Plan's debut album Other Voices, Other Rooms. In Australia, only 1000 copies were made and the single is considered rare.

== Track listings ==
CD Single

1. "Shadows" - 3:41
2. "Melophobia" - 3:46
3. "Teardrop" (Massive Attack cover) - 5:36

== Charts ==
Chart (2008)	Peak position
Australia (ARIA Charts)	94

== Release history ==
Country	Release date	Format	Label	Catalogue
Australia	8 November 2008	CD Single, Download	Boomtown Records	BTR040
