= War on Time =

Studio album by Angelas Dish
- Released: 23 February 2008
- Recorded: 2007; Malt and Mangrove Studios
- Genre: Indie pop
- Length: 41:48
- Label: BNM Records
- Producer: David Nicholas; Mark Needham

Angelas Dish chronology
Soft November (2007)	War on Time (2008)	Step Up (2009)

Singles from War on Time
- 1. "Soft November" Released: 27 October 2007; 2. "Yeah... But Not Tonight" Released: 2008

Professional ratings
Review scores
Source	Rating
FasterLouder.com	Favourable

War on Time is the debut studio album by Australian indie pop band Angelas Dish, released on 23 February 2008. It was recorded in 2007 at Malt and Mangrove studios with David Nicholas and Mark Needham.

Kill Your Stereo said "It is an album you really have to spin a few times to learn the dips, riffs and lyrics to really enjoy and pick up on all the little things that you may not have in the beginning. In terms of technicality there is nothing strictly bad about this album although I can see where others have developed the notion that it is rather bland and heavy on the pop and commercial sensibilities." Concluding with "This punchy pop record is only the beginning and a warm up for their amazing live shows."

== Track listing ==
1. "Let You Go" – 2:51
2. "Soft November" – 3:47
3. "Seven Years" – 3:14
4. "When the End Comes" – 4:03
5. "Piano Song" – 4:47
6. "Yeah... But Not Tonight" – 3:12
7. "Memory" – 1:48
8. "All in the Stars" – 3:09
9. "The Lucky One" – 4:09
10. "Hollow" – 4:04
11. "Engine Stalled" – 3:13
12. "Paint a Picture" – 3:47

== Release history ==
Country	Date	Format	Label	Catalogue
Australia	February 2008	Digital download, CD	BNM Records	BNM0006
