= Shakedown (Snowboard Games) =

Ride Shakedown.

The Shakedown Original Snowboard Games is a rider-driven snowboard event whose primary goal is to promote snowboarding. Its unique competition format makes the event a laid-back festive gathering that is appreciated by athletes and the fans.

== Description ==
Since its inception in 2002, Shakedown events have drawn in thousands of fans and athletes worldwide. As of 2010, this snowboarding event has multiplied. In fact, the Shakedown started exporting its concept to the United States in 2010/2011 and to Europe in 2011.

At the Shakedown, athletes will take part in a slopestyle competition that demands a mastery of two different disciplines: the big air and the rail setup, which features multiple options revealed only on the first day of competition. Though fans revel in the unveiling of the Shakedown’s best-kept secret, it is also highly anticipated by participants, who must adapt their strategies accordingly.

Athletes have a set time frame in which to perform their judged runs and must announce them before they are carried out in front of the industry players and audience members. There is no pre-determined order. Riders perform when they feel ready. Prize money is awarded to the top athletes.

== History ==
=== Shakedown ===
- 2015 : Shakedown
  - Canada (QC, Mont Saint-Sauveur, Avila section), April 4, 2015
- 2014 : Ride Shakedown
  - Canada (QC, Mont Saint-Sauveur), April 4–5, 2014
- 2013 : Ride Shakedown
  - Canada (QC, Mont Saint-Sauveur), April 5–6, 2013
- 2012: Ride Shakedown
  - Canada (QC, Mont Saint-Sauveur), March 30–31, 2012
- 2011: Ride Shakedown
  - Europe (Germany, Garmisch-Partenkirchen), March 11–12, 2011
  - USA (Washington, near Seattle, The Summit at Snoqualmie), March 18–19, 2011
  - Canada (QC, Mont Saint-Sauveur), April 1–2, 2011
- 2010: Ride Shakedown
  - USA (Washington, near Seattle, The Summit at Snoqualmie), March 12–13, 2010
  - Canada (QC, Mont Saint-Sauveur), April 2–3, 2010
- 2009: Ride Shakedown (Change in title sponsor)
  - Canada (QC, Mont Saint-Sauveur), April 3–4, 2009

=== Empire Shakedown ===
- 2008: Empire Shakedown
  - Canada (QC, Mont Saint-Sauveur), April 4–5, 2008
- 2007: Empire Shakedown
  - Canada (QC, Mont Saint-Sauveur), April 6–7, 2007
- 2006: Empire Shakedown
  - Canada (QC, Mont Saint-Sauveur), March 24–25, 2006
- 2005: Empire Shakedown
  - Canada (QC, Mont Saint-Sauveur), March 26, 2005
- 2004: Empire Shakedown
  - Canada (QC, Mont Saint-Sauveur), April 3, 2004
- 2003: Empire Shakedown
  - Canada (QC, Mont Saint-Sauveur), March 22, 2003
- 2002: Empire Shakedown
  - Canada (QC, Mont Saint-Sauveur), March 23, 2002
