= Behind Crimson Eyes (album) =

Studio album by Behind Crimson Eyes
- Released: 20 March 2009
- Recorded: 2008
- Genre: Post-hardcore, hard rock
- Length: 34:30
- Label: Roadrunner

Behind Crimson Eyes chronology
A Revelation for Despair (2006)	Behind Crimson Eyes (2009)

Behind Crimson Eyes is the second studio album by Australian rock band Behind Crimson Eyes, released through Roadrunner Records on 20 March 2009. The band has released two singles from the album, "Addicted" and "Fighting for Our Lives".

== Track listing ==
1. "Addicted" — 3:07
2. "Fighting for Our Lives" — 3:39
3. "Armageddonouttahere" — 4:24
4. "Death From Above" — 2:47
5. "My Love" — 3:30
6. "Coming Home" — 3:16
7. "I Never Wanted This" — 3:15
8. "This Is Who We Are" — 2:56
9. "Stay with Me" — 4:05
10. "Miss Heartbreaker" — 3:33

== Charts ==
Chart (2009)	Peak position
Australian Albums (ARIA Charts)	56
