= The Getaway Plan =

Australian rock band

- Origin: Melbourne, Victoria, Australia
- Genres: Alternative rock; pop punk
- Years active: 2004–2009; 2010–present
- Labels: Dope Mountain; UNFD; Boomtown
- Members: Clint Owen Ellis; Dan Maio; Matthew Wright; Mike Maio
- Past members: Aaron Barnett; Benny Chong; Dave Anderson; Jase Clarke
- Website: www.thegetawayplan.com

The Getaway Plan are an Australian rock band, which formed in 2004. Founding mainstays are Matthew Wright on lead vocals, piano and rhythm guitar and Clint Ellis on lead guitar. They were joined in 2014 by Dan Maio on drums, and his brother, Mike Maio on bass guitar. Former long-term members are Dave Anderson on bass guitar and Aaron Barnett on drums and percussion.

The Getaway Plan found commercial success in Australia upon the release of their debut studio album, Other Voices, Other Rooms, in 2008. The album peaked at number one on the AIR Charts (Australian Independent Records) and number 14 on the ARIA Albums Chart. Their second studio album, Requiem, appeared in 2011. The group's first self-funded, A double a-sided single is "Lovesick/Mirrors" (2013). The Getaway Plan released their third studio album, Dark Horses, in 2015. It debuted at number ten on the ARIA Albums Chart – their highest position in Australia.

== History ==
=== Formation and Hold Conversation (2004–2008) ===
The Getaway Plan were originally a five-piece band. The original members met in 2002 whilst attending Sandringham College in the southern beachside suburbs of Melbourne, Australia. Playing originally as a four-piece pop-punk/rock band under the name "Thirtyfivehours". Following the breakup of Thirtyfivehours, the remaining members met guitarist, Clint Ellis and new drummer, Aaron Barnett, and recruited them for a new heavier-sounding project. The Getaway Plan's first gig was at a community hall in November '03.

Following a 2004 demo recording, the band signed a record deal with Boomtown Records; Boomtown released the band's debut commercial release, an EP entitled, Hold Conversation. Tracks from the EP received airplay on Australian national youth radio station, Triple J, including medium rotation for the track, "If The Suspense Doesn't Kill Us, Something Else Will..."

Their fellow fifth member, rhythm guitarist/backup singer and long time friend, Benny Chong left the band in 2006.

=== Commercial breakthrough and Other Voices, Other Rooms (2008–2009) ===
In 2007, The Getaway Plan travelled to Florida in the United States to record their debut album with James Paul Wisner. They lived and worked together for over two months to complete the album, titled Other Voices, Other Rooms. Lead vocalist Matthew Wright said of the work behind the album, "It’s the result of over three years touring and about three months of writing".

The band spent 12 weeks writing the album, in a little rehearsal room in Australia. Once enough material had been written, they began a search for a producer. The band opted not to use a local for the job, guitarist Clint Splattering explained, "We couldn’t really find anyone in Australia that we felt was on the same page as us, there are a lot of great producers in Australia but none that we felt were on the same level that we wanted them to be on." After sending out a "bunch of emails", they received a reply from James Paul Wisner, who had previously worked with the likes of The Academy Is..., Dashboard Confessional and Underoath. Wisner ended up producing the album.

The Getaway Plan recorded their first ever music video for the single "Streetlight" in October 2007. The song was released in the beginning of November 2007 through Boomtown and Shock Records, it was the first taste of new material for fans. Following the successful release of "Streetlight" and significant radio airplay on Triple J, the band supported American band My Chemical Romance on their Australian arena tour and opened for The Used on their Australian tour in May 2007.

The band's debut album was released in February 2008, achieving great success for an independent band. Other Voices, Other Rooms debuted at number 14 on the ARIA charts and number 1 on the Australian Independent charts. It was the number 3 Australian album on the ARIA chart. The second single from the album "Where the City Meets the Sea" was released in March 2008, bringing the band airplay on national radio station Nova.

In July 2008 the band performed live nationally on Rove. "Where the City Meets the Sea" was announced the Best Independent Single/EP at the annual AIR Awards.

=== Hiatus (2009–2010) ===
On 25 February 2009, The Getaway Plan announced in their MySpace blog that they would disband in 2009. The band stated:

"There comes a point in everyone's lives where they must sit back and assess if everything is working the way it should be. We have come to a decision that The Getaway Plan will no longer continue to make music together. The past 5 years have been an incredible journey and we would never have been able to say that without the support of each and every one of you.

We are in the final stages of planning one last national tour. Please come along and party with TGP one last time. It would mean the world to us.

This is in no way the end of our careers as musicians. Music is and always will be the biggest part of our lives. Thank you all so much for everything; we are all eternally grateful for your support."

— Aaron, Clint, Dave & Matthew,

==== Post-breakup projects ====
Shortly after the breakup of The Getaway Plan, all members had announced their own projects separately. Wright formed the indie duet Young Heretics with singer/songwriter Kitty Hart. The pair had a Jack and Meg White style mystery surrounding the particulars of their relationship, reported by the media to be brother and sister despite rumours the pair were, in fact, lovers. Young Heretics are now defunct. Ellis and Barnett formed another band called Avalanche for Aeris with Kevin Orr, which has since split up. Barnett was also in a band called, "Saskia" along with Anderson, ex-Anastacia guitarist Jayszun Vandewerff, and Amanda Grafanakis who finished 13th in reality TV show Australian Idol 2008. In 2009, guitarist Clint Ellis joined The Amity Affliction. He left the band in 2011. Aaron was also at one point in the live band for Melbourne hardcore band, Deez Nuts.

=== Reformation and Requiem (2010–2013) ===
On 23 July 2010, it was announced on Facebook that the reality of youth depression had inspired The Getaway Plan to reunite for a one off music event, REVIVAL - This Is Not The End of Your Story, in conjunction with To Write Love on Her Arms, a not for profit movement. The show took place on 24 September 2010 at Billboard The Venue in Melbourne and sold out within an hour of tickets going on sale.

Prior to this event appeared a strange countdown on the band's official site finishing on 27 September at 12:00pm AEST. When the countdown reached zero a picture of the band popped up to replace it. The picture appeared to be the band in a room with their instruments and what also appeared to be song names and BPM's written on a white board. Also appearing were 8 other countdowns running simultaneously, all ending at different points in the future, with the last ending on 19 November. Every time a countdown finished, a short video was posted informing fans of the band's progress. The first video, "01", simply showed Matthew Wright playing a guitar and humming. The next four videos, "02" to "05", featured short interviews with the band members.

On 1 November 2010, the band played at Melbourne under age festival, Another World. The fans didn't know what to expect as the band didn't announce the show themselves and had no talk of it. The band opened with a brand new song never played before. The track was believed to be called "Move Along" as one of the videos on the band's website showed the matching lyrics to the song. The file with these lyrics was named "Move Along". A week later, at the end of one of the countdowns, another video was posted, "06", carrying footage of the band's sound check and setting up for the show. The fans watching also got a glimpse at the setlist and it was confirmed that the new track was named "Move Along". The final video, "07", showed Matthew confessing that he thought the band's break-up had been beneficial, both for the band as a whole, and the band members themselves, as friends.

On 19 November 2010, the band announced through their website that they would officially be reforming. The band announced they would be heading off to Canada in April to record the new album with producer David Bottrill. Along with these two announcements they also announced a tour, dubbed "The Getaway Plan: Reclamation" tour, planned for February 2011 in celebration of their reformation. This marked the end of the countdowns sequenced on their website.

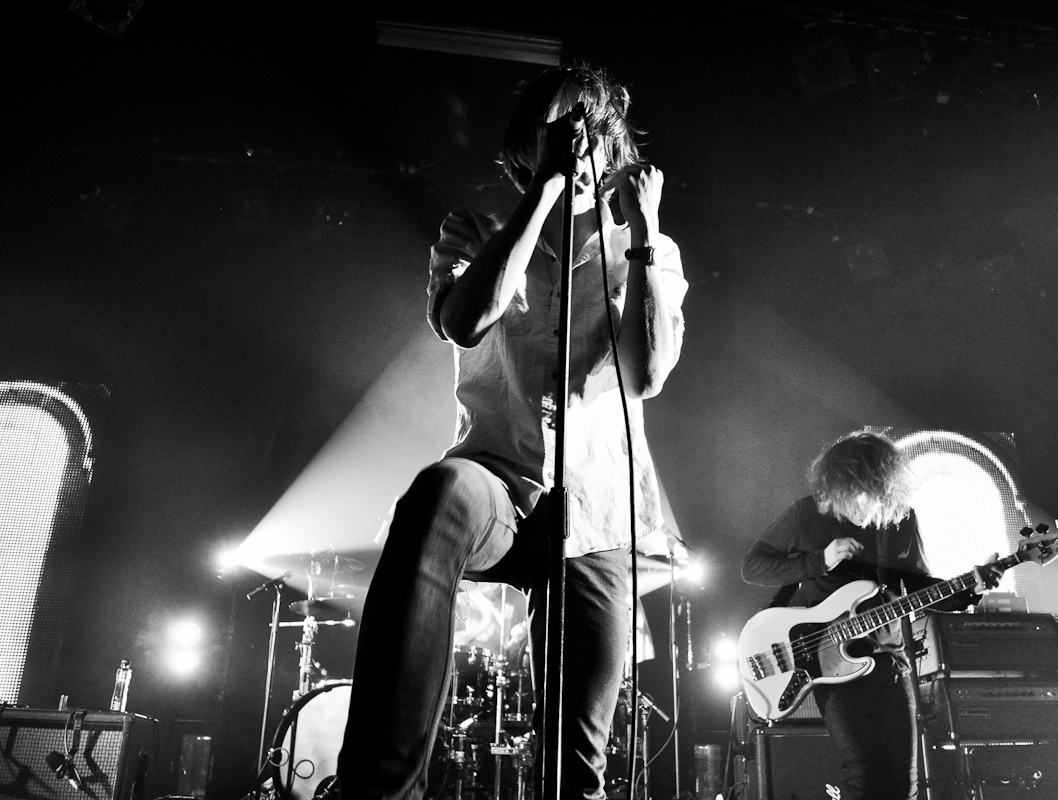
The band performing in 2011

On 14 April 2011, it was confirmed in a short video posted on the band's official website and tumblr that the new album marking their reformation will be called 'Requiem' with a release of September 2011.

During the months of April through September, the band continued to provide blog updates, including 7 webisodes, which featured interviews with band members, giving the public some insight into the recording process of 'Requiem'.

On 18 August 2011, The Getaway Plan released a song, "Phantoms" from their upcoming album, Requiem on their official Facebook page.

On 4 November 2011, Requiem was released through We Are Unified.

=== Line-up changes and departure from label (2013–2014) ===
On 1 July 2013, The Getaway Plan announced that they had decided to part ways with bass player David Anderson and that they were also no longer with their long time record label/management, UNFD. Along with this announcement came the news of their new bass player, long-time friend, Jase Clarke and their first ever fully independent release; A double A-Sided single, entitled "Lovesick/Mirrors". To support the release they also announced their broadest Australian tour in nearly five years.

"Lovesick/Mirrors" was released digitally through iTunes on 12 August 2013. The band also released a limited run of hand numbered, 7-inch vinyl were sold on their online webstore.

The Getaway Plan embarked on their third tour of Europe and the UK in September, 2013, supporting US band Sleeping With Sirens.

On 13 February 2014, The Getaway Plan announced on Facebook that they had decided to parted ways with drummer, Aaron Barnett. With this news also came the announcement of new drummer, Dan Maio.

=== Dark Horses (2014–present) ===
On 1 September 2014, The Getaway Plan announced their plans for their third LP, entitled Dark Horses. The band chose to avoid record labels and remain independent and set up a crowd-funding campaign through Pledgemusic.com. The band self-recorded a 4 track EP entitled 'Journaux' which was made available as an exclusive to pledgers.

Dark Horses was the first album by The Getaway Plan to be fully written and recorded in Australia. They worked with producer, Sam K, creating the album between November 2014 and March 2015.

Dark Horses was released on 3 July 2015. The album debuted at #1 on the AIR Charts and #10 on the ARIA Albums Chart making it the band's highest ever ARIA debut and their first ever entry in to the ARIA top ten.

Not much activity has been shown by the band since the release of Dark Horses, only playing shows and festivals around Australia.

== Former tour manager controversy ==
In March 2010, the band's former touring manager (who had been sacked in 2009), John Zimmerman, was arrested and charged with rape, child pornography and various related offences. In November 2011, he pleaded guilty to the charges and in December 2011 was sentenced to 16 years imprisonment with a non-parole period of 12 years. The charges stem from crimes committed between 2006 and 2010; while Zimmerman was the tour manager for The Getaway Plan, he lured his victims "with offers of concert tickets, or fame and money which never materialised".

Daniel Cribb at TheMusic website said the band assured their fans and the wider public that "they had nothing to do with it". Matthew Wright told Cribb how they dealt with the controversy: "We dealt with it in our own way. We kind of detached ourselves from the situation as much as we could because we just want to play music and that's all that matters to us, and we don't want anything to get in the way of that. We had no association with any of it – as I'm sure the public know. You'd have to be stupid to try and pin something on us".

== Band members ==
Current members

- Matthew Wright – lead vocals, piano (2004–2009, 2010–present), rhythm guitar (2006–2009; 2010–present)
- Clint Owen Ellis (Splattering) – lead guitar (2004–2009, 2010–present)
- Dan Maio – drums, percussion (2014–present)
- Mike Maio – bass guitar (2014–present)

Former members

- Benny Chong – rhythm guitar, vocals (2004–2006)
- Dave Anderson – bass guitar (2004–09, 2010–2013)
- Aaron Barnett – drums, percussion (2004–2009, 2010–2014)
- Jase Clarke – bass guitar (2013–2014)

Timeline

== Discography ==
=== Studio albums ===
| Title | Album details | Peak chart positions | |
| Title | Album details | AUS | AUS Indie |
|---|---|---|---|
| Other Voices, Other Rooms | Released: 9 February 2008; Label: Boomtown, Shock; Formats: CD, CD+DVD, digital download | 14 | 1 |
| Requiem | Released: 4 November 2011; Label: We Are Unified; Formats: CD, LP, digital download | 17 | 2 |
| Dark Horses | Released: 3 July 2015; Label: Dope Mountain; Format: CD, digital download | 10 | 1 |

=== Extended plays ===
| Title | Album details |
|---|---|
| Hold Conversation | Released: 13 March 2006; Label: Boomtown, Shock; Format: CD, digital download |
| Lovesick | Released: 4 October 2013; Label: Warner; Format: Digital download |
| Journaux | Released: 31 August 2014; Label: Self-released; Format: Digital download |

=== Compilation albums ===
| Title | Album details |
|---|---|
| 2004–2009 | Released: 15 May 2009; Label: Boomtown, Shock; Formats: CD, digital download |

=== Demo albums ===
| Title | Album details |
|---|---|
| The Getaway Plan | Released: 2005; Label: Self-released; Formats: CD |

=== Singles ===
| Title | Year | Peak chart positions | Album |
| Title | Year | AUS | Album |
|---|---|---|---|
| "Streetlight" | 2007 | — | Other Voices, Other Rooms |
| "Where the City Meets the Sea" | 2008 | 28 | Other Voices, Other Rooms |
| "Shadows" | 2008 | 94 | Other Voices, Other Rooms |
| "The Reckoning" | 2011 | — | Requiem |
| "Phantoms" | 2013 | — | Requiem |
| "Lovesick" / "Mirrors" | 2013 | — | —N/a |
| "Last Words" | 2015 | — | Dark Horses |

== Awards ==
=== AIR Awards ===
The Australian Independent Record Awards (commonly known informally as AIR Awards) is an annual awards night to recognise, promote and celebrate the success of Australia's Independent Music sector.

| Year | Nominee / work | Award | Result |
|---|---|---|---|
| 2008 | Themselves | Best Independent Artist | Nominated |
| 2008 | Other Voices, Other Rooms | Best Independent Hard Rock/Punk Album | Won |
| 2008 | "Where the City Meets the Sea" | Best Independent Single/EP | Won |
