= A Who's Who Road of Living =

EP by Horsell Common
- Released: September 2003
- Recorded: Atlantis Studios, Melbourne, Victoria
- Genre: Alternative rock, hardcore punk
- Length: 16:01
- Label: Dork Records
- Producer: George Elliot Swanson

Horsell Common chronology
A Who's Who Road of Living (2003)	Lost a Lot of Blood (2005)

A Who's Who Road of Living is the debut EP by Australian alternative rock band Horsell Common. The EP was released in September 2003, and its style consists mainly of hardcore punk with random melodic moments, traces of alternative rock and even, in "Take A Breath", a tribute to hip-hop.

== Recording ==
"A Who's Who Road of Living" was recording at Atlantis Studios in Melbourne, and mixed by George Elliot Swanson. Ten songs were actually recorded during this session; "Recital", "Order", "Dagger", "In Theory", "The First Lines", "Take A Breath", "Broken Hands", "Falling Short", "Stick & Move", and "Plaster Cast". The band felt they were not yet ready to release a full-length album, so they split up the songs; the first six were released on this EP; "Order" was re-released along with "Broken Hands", "Plaster Cast" and "Stick & Move" on the "Order" 7" single in February 2004; and "Falling Short" was released on the "Caddy of the Year" compilation CD from Below Par Records.

== Singles ==
"Order" was released on the afore-mentioned 7" single.

A video was made for "In Theory", featuring Chopper Read and directed by Remo Camerota. This was the band's first video. The song is the shortest on the EP at only 2:09, and is only the song on the EP that consists entirely of clean singing.

== Track listing ==
- "Recital" – 2:43
- "Order" – 2:48
- "Dagger" – 2:38
- "In Theory" – 2:09
- "The First Lines" – 2:10
- "Take a Breath" – 2:33

== Personnel ==
- Mark Stewart – vocals, guitar
- Luke Cripps – bass guitar
- Leigh Pengelly – drums
