= Hope Is for Hopers =

Hope is for Hopers

Studio album by Philadelphia Grand Jury
- Released: September 2009
- Recorded: 2009
- Genre: Indie rock
- Length: 33:28
- Label: Normal People Making Hits/Boomtown
- Producer: Berkfinger

Philadelphia Grand Jury chronology
Hope is for Hopers (2009)	Hope is for the Hopeless (2010)

Hope is for Hopers is the debut album by Sydney indie rock band Philadelphia Grand Jury. It was released in September 2009 and contains their hits "The Good News", "Going to the Casino (Tomorrow Night)", and "I Don't Want to Party (Party)".

At the J Awards of 2009, the album was nominated for Australian Album of the Year.

== Track listing ==
1. "Ready to Roll" – 1:53
2. "The Good News" – 2:59
3. "When Your Boyfriend Comes Back to Town" – 3:09
4. "Wet Winter Holiday" – 3:15
5. "I'm Going to Kill You" – 2:29
6. "Foot in My Mouth" – 2:01
7. "Phillip's Not in Love with You" – 2:41
8. "Growing Up Alone" – 3:21
9. "Going to the Casino (Tomorrow Night)" – 2:54
10. "No You Don't" – 1:32
11. "The New Neil Young" – 4:01
12. "I Don't Want to Party (Party)" – 3:08
  - "Dotty No" (bonus track)

== Personnel ==
- Simon Berckelman
- Joel Beeson
- Calvin Welch
- Dan Williams

== Charts ==
Chart performance for Hope Is for Hopers
Chart (2009)	Peak position
Australian Albums (ARIA)	34
