= Lost a Lot of Blood =

Lost A Lot Of Blood

EP by Horsell Common
- Released: 4 April 2005
- Genre: Alternative rock
- Length: 19:01
- Label: Set Fire To My Home Records
- Producer: D.W. Norton

Horsell Common chronology
A Who's Who Road of Living (2002)	Lost A Lot Of Blood (2005)	The Birds and the Bees (2006)

Lost a Lot of Blood is the second EP by Australian alternative rock band Horsell Common. The EP has a more melodic style than the band's previous EP, A Who's Who Road of Living.

A music video was made for "The Disaster", the band's second video (the first being the video for "In Theory").

== Reception ==
A review at FasterLouder said Horsell Common "...have one up on the rest of the pack – their music comes across as a lot more genuine...the instrumentation is admirable from the three piece, with layered heavy guitars spiralling into tense breakdowns, backed by intermittent machine-gun drumming, and a rhythm section that occasionally belies the heavy direction of the music."

== Track listing ==
1. "The Disaster" - 3:54
2. "Sentenced" - 3:12
3. "This Modern Shame" - 3:53
4. "Look Away" - 4:12
5. "Dean Youngblood" - 3:50

== Personnel ==
- Mark Stewart - vocals, guitar
- Luke Cripps - bass guitar
- Leigh Pengelly - drums
