= The Birds and the Bees (EP) =

The Birds & The Bees

EP by Horsell Common / Trial Kennedy
- Released: 4 April 2006
- Recorded: Backbeach Studios, Melbourne, Australia
- Genre: Alternative rock
- Label: Helltrack Records/Set Fire To My Home
- Producer: DW Norton

Horsell Common chronology
| Lost a Lot of Blood (2005) | The Birds and the Bees (2006) | Satellite Wonderland (2006) |

Trial Kennedy chronology
| Picture Frame (EP) (2006) | The Birds and the Bees (2006) | New Manic Art (2008) |

The Birds and the Bees is split EP between Australian bands Trial Kennedy and Horsell Common, released 4 April 2006. It features three songs by each band, one of them being an acoustic cover of one of the other band's songs.

== Track listing ==
Tracks 1, 2 and 5 are recorded by Horsell Common, tracks 3, 4 and 6 are recorded by Trial Kennedy. Track 5 is Horsell Common's cover of "Knife Light" by Trial Kennedy. Track 6 is Trial Kennedy's cover of "The Disaster" by Horsell Common.

1. "Everlasting" - 3:00
2. "Milk Was a Bad Choice" - 3:38
3. "Sonic Affair" - 4:26
4. "My Idol Who?" - 3:39
5. "Knife Light (acoustic)" - 3:14
6. "The Disaster (acoustic)" - 3:07

== Personnel ==
Horsell Common -

- Mark Stewart - Vocals, Guitar
- Luke Cripps - Bass Guitar
- Leigh Pengelly - Drums

Trial Kennedy -

- Tim Morrison - Lead Vocals
- Stacey Gray - Guitar, Vocals
- Aaron Malcolmson - Bass Guitar
- Shaun Gionis - Drums
