= The Rescue (Horsell Common album) =

Studio album by Horsell Common
- Released: 29 September 2007
- Genre: Alternative rock, grunge, rock
- Length: 42:26
- Label: Boomtown
- Producer: Stephen Haigler

Horsell Common chronology
Satellite Wonderland (2006)	The Rescue (2007)

Singles from The Rescue
- 1. "Good from Afar" Released: 1 September 2007; 2. "Sing the News" Released: 2008

The Rescue is the only studio by Australian band Horsell Common. The album contains 11 tracks and it was released on 29 September 2007. The album entered the Australian Independent Records Charts at #6. and the ARIA Charts at number 100.

== Track listing ==
1. "Good from Afar" - 3:17
2. "Bruise Easy" - 3:00
3. "Automation" - 5:22
4. "Help is on Its Way" - 3:40
5. "Sing the News" - 3:27
6. "Annie, If You're Listening" (featuring Lisa Gammaldi of Capeside) - 3:39
7. "It's OK" - 3:33
8. "I'm Dead" (featuring Stephen Christian of Anberlin) - 5:02
9. "The Sound of Breaking Records" - 2:48
10. "Gone for the Summer" - 3:01
11. "Surgery" - 5:41

== Charts ==
Chart (2007)	Peak position
Australian Albums (ARIA)	100

== Personnel ==
- Mark Stewart - vocals, guitar
- Luke Cripps - bass guitar
- Leigh Pengelly - drums
- Stephen Christian - guest vocals on "I’m Dead"
- Lisa Gammaldi - guest vocals on "Annie, If You’re Listening"
- Stephen Haigler - producer
