= Requiem (The Getaway Plan album) =

Studio album by The Getaway Plan
- Released: 4 November 2011
- Recorded: April 2011 at Phase One Studios in Toronto, Ontario
- Genre: Alternative rock, indie rock
- Length: 47:54
- Label: We Are Unified
- Producer: David Bottrill

The Getaway Plan chronology
Other Voices, Other Rooms (2008)	Requiem (2011)	Dark Horses (2015)

Singles from Requiem
- 1. "The Reckoning" Released: 7 October 2011; 2. "Move Along" Released: 7 March 2012

Requiem is the second album by Australian alternative rock band The Getaway Plan which was released on 4 November 2011.

The album notably sees a departure from the band's previous post-hardcore sound, in favour of more of an alternative rock sound.

== Background ==
On 19 November 2010, the band announced through their website that they would officially be reforming and writing new music. The band headed off to Canada in April to record the new album with producer David Bottrill (Muse, Tool, Silverchair). They tracked the bed tracks at Phase One Studios. Along with these two announcements, they also confirmed a tour, dubbed "The Getaway Plan: Reclamation" tour, beginning in February 2011, in celebration of their reformation. This marked the end of the countdowns sequenced on their website.

On 14 April 2011, it was confirmed in a short video posted on the band's official website and tumblr that the new album marking their reformation was titled "Requiem" with a tentative release of September 2011.

On 18 August 2011, The Getaway Plan released a song, "Phantoms" from the upcoming album on their official Facebook page. The first single, "The Reckoning", was announced in August, with the official video released on 22 September. As revealed in a couple of their videos, the release date for the album was confirmed as 4 November 2011 through We Are Unified.

In late September, the band posted a link to a third new song, "Flying Colours". The link was later taken down. "Flying Colours", as well as two other new songs "February" and "Requiem" were previewed on Richard Kingsmill's triple j radio show on 30 September. Additionally, a song titled "Move Along" was put up, along with "The Reckoning", "Phantoms" and "Flying Colours" on The Getaway Plan's facebook page.

On 1 November, three days before album release, the band created an app for iPhone/iPod touch which contained new music (including "Move Along") and band news. The album was put up for streaming at a day before release.

'Requiem' was released through We Are Unified on 4 November 2011.

== Charts ==
Year	Chart	Peak position
2011	ARIA Albums Chart	#17
2011	Australian Independent Records Chart	#2

== Track listing ==
All lyrics written by Matthew Wright, all music composed by The Getaway Plan

No.	Title	Length
1.	"The Reckoning"	3:38
2.	"Phantoms"	4:04
3.	"Flying Colours"	4:34
4.	"Move Along"	4:08
5.	"February"	4:19
6.	"Coming Home"	4:14
7.	"S.T.A.R.S"	5:22
8.	"Heartstone"	5:07
9.	"Oceans Between Us"	3:57
10.	"Child of Light"	3:59
11.	"Requiem"	4:42
Total length:		47:54

== Personnel ==
- Matthew Wright – Lead vocals, piano, rhythm guitar
- Clint Owen Ellis – Lead guitar
- Dave Anderson – Bass guitar
- Aaron Barnett – Drums, percussion

Additional Personnel

- David Bottrill - Producer, Mixer
- Michael Phillips - Engineer
- Dajaun Martineau - Assistant Tracking Engineer
- Robbie Grunwald - Organ, Keyboards
- Steve Zsirai - Upright Bass on 'Child of Light'
- CJ Bolland - Programming on 'The Reckoning'
- Kevin Fox - Strings, Horns and Woodwinds arrangement
- Sterling Hall School Boys Choir - Vocals on Tracks 1, 6, 7, 8.
- Sharon Riley & The Faith Chorale - Vocals on Tracks 1, 8, 10, 11
