= Good from Afar =

2007 single by Horsell Common

"Good From Afar"

Single by Horsell Common

from the album The Rescue
- Released: 1 September 2007
- Genre: Alternative rock, grunge, rock
- Label: Boomtown Records
- Songwriter(s): Mark Stewart, Luke Cripps, Leigh Pengelly

Horsell Common singles chronology
"Royal Artillery" (2006)	"Good From Afar" (2007)	"Sing the News" (2008)

"Good From Afar" is the first single released from Melbourne band Horsell Common's first album The Rescue. The single entered the Australian Independent Records Chart at #5 and at number 95 on the ARIA Charts.

== Track listing ==
1. "Good from Afar" – 3:18
2. "Good from Afar (Remix)" – 6:10
3. "Weeds" – 3:07
4. "A Praise Chorus" – 4:21
5. "Blood and Wine" – 3:59

== Charts ==
Chart (2007)	Peak position
Australia (ARIA Charts)	95
