= Lovesick / Mirrors =

"Lovesick" / "Mirrors"

Single by The Getaway Plan
- Released: 12 August 2013
- Genre: Indie rock, pop rock
- Label: Self Released
- Songwriter(s): Lovesick: Clint Owen Ellis, Matthew Wright, Aaron Barnett; Mirrors: Clint Owen Ellis, Matthew Wright, Aaron Barnett, D Anderson
- Producer(s): The Getaway Plan, Matt Bartlem

The Getaway Plan singles chronology
"The Reckoning" (2011)	"Lovesick" / "Mirrors" (2013)

"Lovesick" / "Mirrors" is a double A-sided single released by Melbourne band The Getaway Plan on 12 August 2013.

This is the band's first fully independent release and marks The Getaway Plan's departure from their label as well as their parting ways with longtime bass player and founding member, Dave Anderson.

The songs were recorded during the 1st week of July 2013 at Loose Stones studios in Queensland, Australia.

"Lovesick" / "Mirrors" was released digitally through iTunes on 12 August 2013. The band also released a limited run of hand numbered, 7-inch vinyl which were sold on their online web store.

== Track listing ==
All lyrics written by Matthew Wright, all music composed by The Getaway Plan

No.	Title	Length
1.	"Lovesick"	4:04
2.	"Mirrors"	3:21
Total length:		7:25

== Personnel ==
- Matthew Wright – Lead vocals, piano, rhythm guitar
- Clint Owen Ellis – Lead guitar
- Jase Clarke – Bass guitar, vocals
- Aaron Barnett – Drums, percussion

Additional Personnel

- Chris Carmichael – Strings on "Lovesick"
- Matthew Bartlem – Producer
- Tyse Lee – Engineer
- J.R. McNeely – Mixer
- Ted Jensen – Mastering
