= Lie Die =

EP by Angelas Dish
- Released: 2005
- Genre: Indie pop
- Length: 22:01
- Label: Boomtown Records

Angelas Dish chronology
Angelas Dish (2003)	Lie Die (2005)	My Body Is An Ashtray (2006)

Professional ratings
Review scores
Source	Rating
Faster Louder.com	favourable

Lie Die is the second EP by Australian indie pop band Angelas Dish. The EP was released in 2005, through Boomtown Records.

In 2010, Kill Your Stereo said "When Angelas Dish released the Lie Die EP in 2005 it was obvious that this would be a band with longevity, in a scene that had so few. That record was fantastic, there was not a single thing wrong with it, and it quickly gained the band a slew of big name support tours which introduced them to many new fans."

== Track list ==
No.	Title	Length
1.	"On a Sign"	3:55
2.	"Televise"	2:19
3.	"Lights Out"	2:36
4.	"Save Me"	2:35
5.	"Remember You"	3:28
6.	"The Light On"	3:51
7.	"Step Up" (Hidden Track)	3:19

== Release history ==
Country	Date	Format	Label	Catalogue
Australia	2005	Digital download CD	Boomtown Records	BTR008
