= Trial Kennedy =

Australian rock band

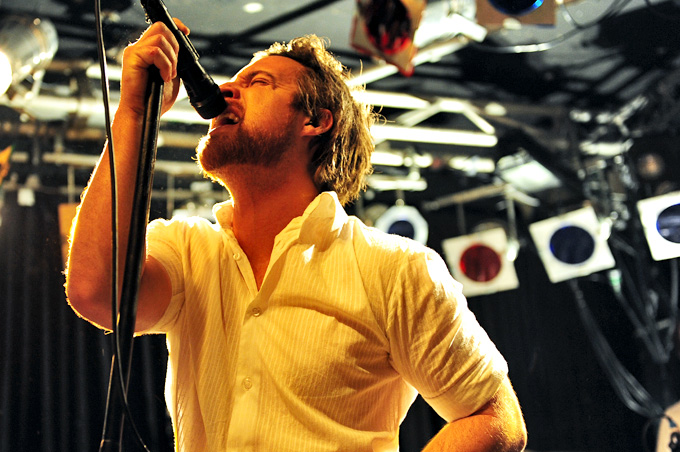
- Trial Kennedy performing at Amplifier Bar

Background information
- Origin: Melbourne, Victoria, Australia
- Genres: Alternative rock; indie rock
- Years active: 2002–2012, 2018
- Past members: Tim Morrison; Stacey Gray; Shaun Gionis; Richard Buxton; Aaron "Big Dog Malco" Malcomson
- Website: trialkennedy.com

Trial Kennedy were an Australian rock band formed in 2002, in Melbourne, Victoria. The band released two albums, both peaked in the Australian top 50. In 2012, the band announced their break-up.

== History ==
=== 2002–2006: Early EPs ===
Trial Kennedy formed in 2002; their first release was an independent extended play (EP), Present for a Day, recorded, engineered and produced by producer Kalju Tonuma. It was released in 2004.

In 2006's, Trial Kennedy released the EP Picture Frame, also produced by Tonuma.

=== 2007–2012: New Manic Art and Living Undesigned ===
Trial Kennedy released their debut studio album, New Manic Art, on 31 May 2008. The album was produced by Nick DiDia and it debuted at number 24 on the ARIA Charts. Singles "Neighbours" and "Colour Day Tours" were instant Triple J anthems.

In September 2010 the band began work on recording their second album at Sing Sing Recording Studios in Melbourne with producer Eric J.

The first song from the second album, titled "Strange Behaviour" was released on 10 November 2010. Australian youth radio station Triple J played this song on high rotation over the summer of 2010/2011. "Best of Tomorrow" was released on 4 March 2011. Living Undesigned was released on 13 May 2011 and peaked at number 48 on the ARIA Charts. Beat Magazine said the album is "powerful [with] fun rock album: dynamic, varied and full of energetic and catchy tunes."

On 16 April 2012, the band announced via Facebook that "For a number of reasons all of us in the band have chosen to close down the project that is Trial Kennedy." The band announced their final tour dates for June 2012 with supports including Foreshadowed, My Echo and Sendfire. Their last gig was at The Corner Hotel, Melbourne, on 23 June 2012.

=== 2013: Post-split activities ===
In April 2013, Tim auditioned for Season 2 of The Voice (Australia) and after having two judges turn their chair he chose Delta Goodrem as his coach. He defeated Oscar Chavesz in the Battle Rounds. He then progressed through the Showdown Rounds as one of the final four members of Goodrem's team left in the competition.

In November 2017, the band announced a live performance for 26 May 2018, to celebrate the ten-year anniversary of the release of New Manic Art.

== Discography ==
=== Studio albums ===
Title	Details	Peak chart positions
Title	Details	AUS
New Manic Art	Released: 31 May 2008; Label: Sony Music Australia (88697313182); Format: CD, CD+DVD, digital download	24
Living Undesigned	Released: 13 May 2011; Label: MGM (TK0003); Format: CD, digital download	48

=== Extended plays ===
Title	Details
Present for a Day	Released: 2004; Label: Trial Kennedy; Format: CD
Picture Frame	Released: 2005; Label: Helltrack Records (HELL03); Format: CD
The Birds and the Bees (with Horsell Common)	Released: 4 April 2006; Label: Set Fire to My Home (SFR12); Format: CD, Digital Download

=== Singles ===
Title	Year	Album
"The Great Escape"	2006	Non-album single
"Neighbours"	2008	New Manic Art
"Colour Day Tours"	2008	New Manic Art
"Sunday Warning"	2008	New Manic Art
"Strange Behaviour"	2010	Living Undesigned
"Best of Tomorrow"	2011	Living Undesigned
"Exology"	2011	Living Undesigned

== Awards and nominations ==
=== AIR Awards ===
The Australian Independent Record Awards (commonly known informally as AIR Awards) is an annual awards night to recognise, promote and celebrate the success of Australia's Independent Music sector.

Year	Nominee / work	Award	Result
2011	Living Undesigned	Best Independent Hard Rock/Punk Album	Nominated
