= Other Voices, Other Rooms (The Getaway Plan album) =

Studio album by The Getaway Plan
- Released: 9 February 2008
- Recorded: July 2007; Florida, USA
- Genres: Post-hardcore; emo; alternative rock
- Length: 40:27
- Label: Boomtown
- Producer: James Paul Wisner

The Getaway Plan chronology
Hold Conversation (2006)	Other Voices, Other Rooms (2008)	Requiem (2011)

Singles from Other Voices, Other Rooms
- 1. "Streetlight" Released: 3 November 2007; 2. "Where the City Meets the Sea" Released: 15 March 2008; 3. "Shadows" Released: 8 November 2008

Other Voices, Other Rooms is the debut album by Australian alternative rock band, The Getaway Plan. The album was released through Boomtown Records on 9 February 2008.

This is the first release as a four piece, with the departure of guitarist/vocalist Benny Chong.

== Production details ==
The album was produced in Florida, United States (US), by James Paul Wisner, who has previously worked with Underoath, The Academy Is... and Dashboard Confessional.

== Release details ==
Three songs from the album were released as singles. The first was "Streetlight", released on 3 November 2007. Boomtown and Shock Records released the second and third singles from the album, "Where the City Meets the Sea" and "Shadows", on 15 March 2008 and 8 November 2008, respectively.

== Track listings ==
All tracks are written by The Getaway Plan, except "Entr'acte" adapted from Miserere originally by Gregorio Allegri.

No.	Title	Length
1.	"Other Voices/Other Rooms"	0:20
2.	"Streetlight"	4:13
3.	"Where the City Meets the Sea"	3:38
4.	"Sleep Spindles"	4:13
5.	"New Medicine (Stay with Me)"	4:09
6.	"Shadows"	3:43
7.	"A Lover's Complaint"	4:30
8.	"Red Flag"	5:08
9.	"Entr'acte"	1:24
10.	"Rhapsody on a Windy Night"	4:18
11.	"Transmission"	5:00

=== Tour edition bonus DVD ===
Live from the Hi-Fi
No.	Title	Length
1.	"The Tempest"
2.	"Streetlight"
3.	"Shadows"
4.	"Sleep Spindles"
5.	"New Medicine (Stay with Me)"
6.	"A Lover's Complaint"
7.	"The New Year"
8.	"Red Flag"
9.	"Where the City Meets the Sea"

Music videos
No.	Title	Length
1.	"Streetlight"
2.	"Where the City Meets the Sea"
3.	"Shadows"

== Personnel ==
- Matthew Wright – Lead vocals, piano, rhythm guitar
- Clint Splattering – Lead guitar
- Dave Anderson – Bass guitar
- Aaron Barnett – Drums, percussion

== Charts ==
The album debuted at #14 on the ARIA charts, before falling to #31. It spent a further two weeks in the chart

Year	Chart	Peak position
2008	ARIA Albums Chart	#14
2008	ARIA Physical Albums Chart	#14
2008	ARIA Australian Albums	#3
2008	Australian Independent Records Chart	#1

=== End of year charts ===
Year	Chart	Ranking
2008	ARIA End of Year Australian Albums	#50

== Release history ==
Country	Release date	Format	Label	Catalogue
Australia	9 February 2008	CD, Digital download	Boomtown Records	BTR030
Australia	8 November 2008	CD+DVD	Boomtown Records	BTR030-B
