= Behind Crimson Eyes =

Australian musical group

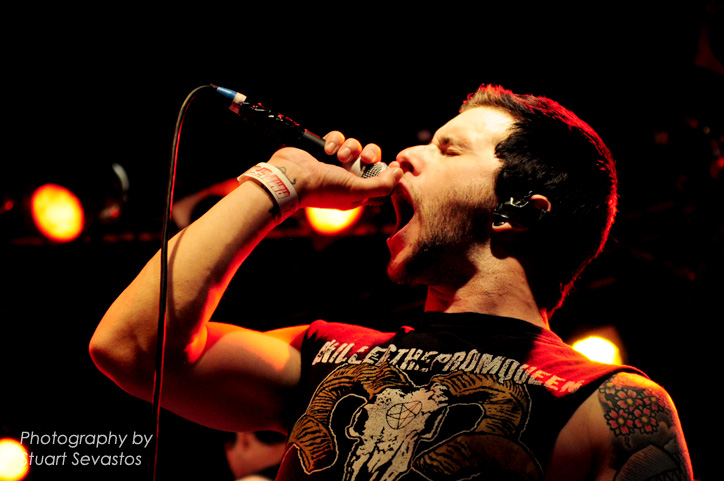

Background information
- Origin: Melbourne, Victoria, Australia
- Genres: Post-hardcore; Emo
- Years active: 2004-present
- Labels: Roadrunner Records; Boomtown Records (2005–2007)
- Members: Josh Stuart (vocals); Aaron Schultz (guitars, vocals); Liam Hennessy (guitars, vocals); Garth Buchanan (bass); Dan Kerby (drums)
- Past members: Kevin Orr (guitar) 2004–2010; Cameron Gilmour (drums) 2007–2009; Prashant 'Baz' Raju (bass) 2004–2007; Steve Szalay (drums) 2004–2007; Bryce Haysom (guitar) 2004
- Website: Official website

Behind Crimson Eyes is a band based in Australia. The band formed in Melbourne, Australia, in 2004. Their line-up currently consists of vocalist Josh Stuart, bassist Garth Buchanan, guitarist/back up vocalist Aaron Schultz and Dan Kerby as drummer.

== Band history ==
Since forming in 2004, Behind Crimson Eyes has played the Melbourne leg of the Taste Of Chaos tour in 2005, after which they sold out all but one show on their national headline tour, clocking up over 150 shows in 2005.

Tracks from their EPs have received airplay on Australian radio station Triple J, featuring on the punk and hardcore show Short Fast Loud, with 3 of their songs making it the high rotation playlist by the end of 2005. The "Prologue" single did well on independent charts in November 2005, receiving airplay on "Australia's most respected commercial radio countdown, Take 40 Australia".

Though only releasing a compilation album in 2007, Behind Crimson Eyes continued to tour Australia. On 20 April 2007, they performed at the free annual Triple J concert, The One Night Stand in the small NSW country town of Cowra. Also, in September 2007, the band joined Welsh metal band, Bullet For My Valentine, on their Australian tour.

They headlined a "jam-packed" schedule of shows in late 2007, including appearances at "Pyramid Rock Festival, Bass In The Dust, Bass In The Grass, Destroy Music, Homebake Festival, Trackside Festival and an abundance of intimate clubs shows."

Behind Crimson Eyes played at the Big Day Out 2008, alongside Rage Against the Machine, Grinspoon, Björk, Enter Shikari and Silverchair. They were also the main support for giant heavy metal band, Iron Maiden. Opening three shows on the Australian leg of their 'Somewhere Back In Time World Tour'. At their three appearances, the band did a cover of Motörhead's 'Ace Of Spades'. They played with Atreyu, Avenged Sevenfold and Bullet For My Valentine on their Australian tour in May 2008.

In September 2008 they opened shows for Disturbed on their Australian tour along with P.O.D. and Alter Bridge.

On 21 January 2010, Kevin Orr announced that he was no longer able to continue playing for BCE, he now has a project where he goes by the alias of Romeo Moon and is set to release his Debut record 'Wander' on 7 May 2014 produced and mixed by Simon Cotter (Courtney Barnett). Cam Gilmour decided to leave BCE not long after Kevin in 2010 you can now see him play on stage with Illy and he also writes his own beats under his own name. Dan Kerby was announced as the replacement drummer for Gilmour.

On 6 January 2011, the band announced they would be taking a 6 to 12-month break. They returned to the live circuit in August 2012 on a headlining tour, presented by Destroy All Lines.

== Albums ==
=== A Revelation for Despair (2006) ===
Behind Crimson Eyes released their debut album A Revelation For Despair on 18 November 2006, through their deal with Roadrunner Records Australia. They broke into the Top 50 ARIA Chart for the first time, with radio support only from Triple J. A Revelation For Despair peaked at No. 43 after entering the chart on 3 December 2006 – 2 weeks after being released.

The 2006 debut album spawned three singles, including "Shakedown", "You've Had Your Chance" and the final one, "The Bonesmen". All 3 had music videos created.

A Revelation For Despair was Behind Crimson Eyes' attempt at a more mainstream direction compared to their previous two EP releases. Featuring rock mixed with elements of the mainstream idea of post-hardcore and pop punk.

=== Self-titled album (2009) ===
Through late 2007 the band were taking some time to write their follow up to A Revelation For Despair. The band announced on their website blog on 6 December 2007, that they had "3 or 4 songs pretty much done". "Behind Crimson Eyes" was released on 20 March 2009. It marked a shift in sound from previous releases, with vocalist Josh Stuart dropping the screaming elements present on previous releases.

On 28 May 2010, Josh Stuart announced the band would be working on a triple EP release.

The first of chapter of these EP's is expected to be released by the end of the year with the subsequent EP's to follow a few months later.

Two songs expected to be on "See You In Hell" are "I'm Gunning For T.G." (the band released a demo of this on their Myspace) and "Hell On Earth" (which the band has been playing live recently).

The band recently played a new song entitled "Fallen Angels" at the Another World Festival in Melbourne.

The EPs release was postponed during 2011 as the band decided to take time off. Writing for the EPs has recommenced as of 2012.

== Awards ==
=== AIR Awards ===
The Australian Independent Record Awards (commonly known informally as AIR Awards) is an annual awards night to recognise, promote and celebrate the success of Australia's Independent Music sector.

Year	Nominee / work	Award	Result
2006	Prologue: The Art of War	Best Performing Independent Single / EP	Nominated
2006	themselves	Most Outstanding New Independent Artist	Nominated

== Discography ==
=== Studio albums ===
List of albums, with selected chart positions
Title	Album details	Peak chart positions
Title	Album details	AUS
A Revelation for Despair	Released: 2006; Label: Boomtown/Roadrunner	43
Behind Crimson Eyes	Released: 20 March 2009; Label: Roadrunner	56
Scream Out Your Name to the Nite	Released: 27 September 2016	—

=== Singles ===
List of singles, with selected chart positions
Title	Year	Peak chart positions
Title	Year	AUS
"Demo"	2004	—
"Pavour Nocturnus"	2005	—
"Prologue-The Art of War" / "Cherry Blossom Epitaph"	2005	63
"Shakedown"	2006	—
"You've Had Your Chance"	2007	—
"The Bonesmen"	2007	—
"Addicted"	2008	—
"Fighting for Our Lives"	2009	—
"Stardust"	2017	—
"Say Bad Things"	2018	—
