= Angelas Dish =

Australian musical group

- Origin: Central Coast, NSW, Australia
- Genres: Indie rock Alternative rock
- Years active: 2003–present
- Labels: BNM Records (2007-2011); Boomtown (2004-2007)
- Members: Michael Harris; Joshua Harris; Peter Clarke; Christopher Allison

Angelas Dish is an Australian indie pop band from the Central Coast of New South Wales, formed in 2003. The four-piece currently consists of songwriting duo, brothers Michael and Joshua Harris, teamed up with bassist Peter Clarke, and drummer Christopher Allison. Michael Harris is the lead singer and most experienced musician of the group. There has been ongoing tension between the brothers, as Joshua has often lived in the shadow of his older sibling, as a result, Joshua Harris has made several solo albums.

Angelas Dish have released five EPs and two studio albums in their fourteen-year career.

== History ==
=== 2003-2006: Beginnings and early EPs on Boomtown Records ===
Angelas Dish formed in 2003 and self-released their self-titled debut EP the same year. In 2004, the band signed with Boomtown Records and released Lie Die in 2005 and My Body Is an Ashtray in 2006. During the release and promotion of these two EPs, the band toured with better known Australian bands, such as Gyroscope, Something With Numbers, After the Fall, Kisschasy and The Butterfly Effect. As well as supporting popular international acts such as Jimmy Eat World, Thirty Seconds to Mars, Anberlin and Copeland.

=== 2007-2010: War on Time & Walk into the Sky on BNM ===
In 2007, Angelas Dish were signed to BNM Records to record their first full-length studio album. On 27 October 2007, Angelas Dish released an EP titled Soft November. The EP peaked at number 51 on the ARIA Charts.

In February 2008, the band released their debut studio album titled, War on Time. It was recorded in Malt and Mangrove Studios on the Central Coast of NSW, with David Nicholas and Mark Needham as producers.

In January 2009, Angelas Dish's former record label, Boomtown Records, released a retrospective album including the band's older material. The compilation album titled Step Up features 18 tracks, incorporating three releases from before their debut album.

In May 2010, Angelas Dish's released their second studio album Walk into the Sky. It was produced by producer Sonny Truelove. Following the album's release, the band left the BNM label

=== 2011-present: Me and You ===
In June 2011, Angelas Dish's self-released the EP Me and You and single "Lost".

At the end of 2011, Angelas Dish left for America with good friend and co-producer Sonny Truelove and went into the studio, with musical talent Michael 'Elvis' Baskette. The band said "We've been financing most of our own records from the very start; so when the opportunity came to co-write with Elvis and have him and Sonny produce our next album there was no holding back - we booked our flights to the US the next day. These new songs are different from our two full-length albums. It sounds like a new band! There's more energy, big ass loud drums, gritty guitars and huge melodic vocal hooks - we love it."

As of 2019, this album has yet to be released. In January 2020, the band confirmed a new EP will be released in 2020.

== Band members ==
- Michael Harris – Vocals, Guitar
- Joshua Harris – Guitar, Vocals
- Peter Clarke – Bass
- Christopher Allison – Drums

== Discography ==
=== Studio albums ===
Title	Details
War on Time	Released: February 2008; Label: BNM Records (BNM0006); Format: CD, digital download
Walk into the Sky	Released: May 2010; Label: BNM Records (BNM0013); Format: CD, digital download

=== Compilation albums ===
Title	Details
Step Up	Released: January 2009; Label: BNM Records (BTR039); Format: CD, digital download

=== Extended plays ===
Title	Details	Peak chart positions
Title	Details	AUS
Angelas Dish	Released: 2003; Label: Angelas Dish; Format: digital download	-
Lie Die	Released: 2005; Label: Boomtown Records (BTR008); Format: digital download, CD	-
My Body Is an Ashtray	Released: July 2006; Label: Boomtown Records (BTR013); Format: digital download, CD	94
Soft November	Released: 27 October 2007; Label: BNM Records (BNM0001); Format: digital download, CD	51
Me and You	Released: June 2011; Label: Angelas Dish; Format: digital download	-

=== Singles ===
Year	Title	Album
2007	"Soft November"	Soft November & War on Time
2008	"Yeah But Not Tonight"	War on Time
2010	"Rapture"	Walk into the Sky
2011	"Crash"	Walk into the Sky
2011	"Lost"	Me and You
