= Where the City Meets the Sea =

"Where The City Meets The Sea"
- CD single cover

Single by The Getaway Plan

from the album Other Voices, Other Rooms
- Released: 2008
- Recorded: 2008
- Genre: Alternative rock
- Length: 3:37
- Label: Boomtown Records
- Songwriters: Dave Anderson, Clint Owen Ellis, Matthew Wright, Aaron Barnett

The Getaway Plan singles chronology
"Streetlight" (2007)	"Where The City Meets The Sea" (2008)	"Shadows" (2008)

Alternative cover
- Digital EP Cover

"Where The City Meets The Sea" is the lead single from the Australian rock band The Getaway Plan's debut album Other Voices, Other Rooms. It reached #28 on the ARIA chart.

== Track listing ==
CD single

1. Where The City Meets The Sea - 3:36
2. The Flood - 3:49
3. Where The City Meets The Sea (Nova 100 acoustic recording) - 3:46

iTunes EP

1. Where The City Meets The Sea - 3:36
2. The Flood - 3:49
3. Where The City Meets The Sea (Nova 100 acoustic recording) - 3:46
4. Streetlight (Live on Triple J)

== Charts ==
The song debuted and peaked at #28, before falling to #39, then exiting top 50. Two weeks later it made two more appearances in the top 50 before exiting again.

=== Weekly charts ===
Chart (2008)	Peak position
Australia (ARIA)	28

=== End of year charts ===
Chart (2008)	Peak position
Australia (ARIA)	34

== Release history ==
Country	Release date	Format	Label	Catalogue
Australia	7 June 2008	CD single, download	Boomtown Records	BTR031
