= A Revelation for Despair =

A Revelation For Despair

Studio album by Behind Crimson Eyes
- Released: 18 November 2006
- Recorded: 2006
- Genre: Post-hardcore
- Length: 42:36
- Label: Boomtown/Roadrunner Records
- Producer: Richard Stolz

Behind Crimson Eyes chronology
A Revelation For Despair (2006)	Behind Crimson Eyes (2009)

A Revelation For Despair is the debut album by Australian hard rock band Behind Crimson Eyes. It was recorded at Sing Sing South, South Yarra and Sing Sing Richmond in Melbourne, Australia. The lead single is "Shakedown". The second single released from the album is "You've Had Your Chance".

== Vocalist Josh Stuart on the album ==
"It's about how this world has lost its way. How everywhere you turn there is something disgusting in disguise. Everyone turns a blind eye but in the end we are all embroiled in its filth. It's about how it tempts us to join this "evil" side and how ultimately we unknowingly promote it. Whether it be by buying violent movies or pornography, idolizing 'rock stars' and other image conscious mediums or indulging in lavish unnecessary material items. We all just close our eyes until it becomes trivial 7pm news and topical conversation. Those who have the power to curb our demise are caught up in corruption, greed and compromised values. In the end this will be all we know and all we see. It will be our god."

== Track listing ==
1. Sex Lies And Homicide – 3:55
2. Children of the Broken Hearted – 2:30
3. Shakedown – 3:15
4. You've Had Your Chance – 3:07
5. White China Doll – 3:48
6. My Crime Against Humanity – 3:23
7. A Love Lost Can Be Beautiful – 2:04
8. I Caused Global Warming – 2:06
9. Your Skin Looks Good on Me – 2:47
10. Dial H For Whore – 3:17
11. The Bonesmen – 3:29
12. The Underworld – 3:07
13. Candy Cane And Pain – 5:53

== Charts ==
Chart (2005)	Peak position
Australian Albums (ARIA Charts)	43
