= Mont Saint-Sauveur =

Ski mountain and resort in Quebec

Sommet Saint-Sauveur
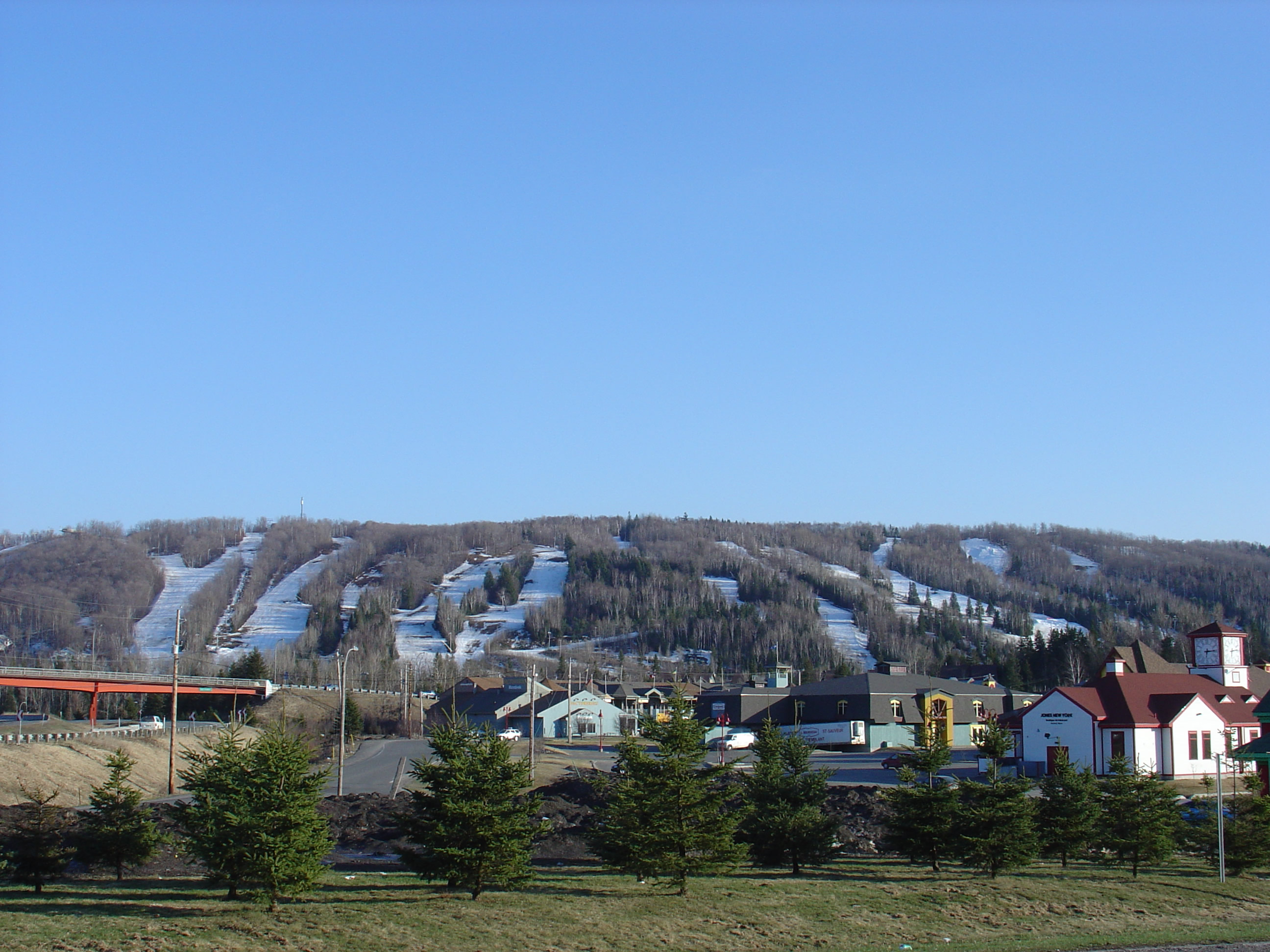

- Location within Quebec
- Location: Saint-Sauveur, Quebec, Canada
- Nearest city: Montreal, Quebec 77 km (48 mi)
- Coordinates: 45°53′08″N 74°09′04″W
- Vertical: 213 m (699 ft)
- Top elevation: 416 m (1,365 ft)
- Base elevation: 203 m (666 ft)
- Skiable area: 142 acres (0.57 km^{2})
- Trails: 40 total 23% Easy; 23% Intermediate; 43% Difficult; 13% Extremely difficult
- Longest run: 1.5 km (0.93 mi)
- Lift system: 8 total 1 detachable six pack 3 detachable quads 2 quadruple chair 1 double chair 1 magic carpet
- Lift capacity: 15,604 skiers/hr
- Snowfall: 460 cm (180 in)
- Snowmaking: 100%
- Night skiing: 27 out of 38 trails
- Website: Sommet Saint-Sauveur

Sommet Saint-Sauveur (French pronunciation: [sɔ.mɛ sɛ̃ so.vœʁ]) (previously Mont Saint-Sauveur), commonly Saint-Sauveur, is a ski mountain and resort located in Saint-Sauveur, Quebec, 45 minutes north of Montreal, Quebec, Canada, in the Laurentian Mountains.

== History ==
Considered the home of Quebec's ski industry, it was here that in 1934, an American named Fred Pabst installed the first ski lift on Hill 70 which rapidly became one of the most popular ski destinations in eastern North America. Eleven years later, a group of businessmen joined with Victor Nymark to form UPHILL LTD. to further develop the site. In 1948, a T-bar, imported from Austria, was installed on Hill 71. Ski lifts on Hills 67 to 72 were installed throughout the following years.

At that time, the site was divided into different lots with different owners. It was not until 1970 that efforts were started to unite the different lots under a common organization under the direction of Jacques G. Hébert. Jacques succeeded in convincing the owners to sell part of their interests to the ski centre. The gradual acquiring of the different lots was finally achieved and in just a few years, the company changed from being a renter to being an owner. Thus, in 1972, Mont Saint-Sauveur resort was born.

During the summer, the park operates as an aquatic theme park.

Sommet Saint-Sauveur is home to Canada's first high-speed six pack chairlift with heated seats. In a $4.7 million investment, in 2019, the « Sommet Express » lift replaced a 1985-built high-speed quadruple lift.

== Description ==
Sommet Saint-Sauveur is known for its world class night skiing and Quebec's longest ski season, with more than 160 days of operation.

Sommet Saint-Sauveur's snow school program is Quebec's most decorated ski school, « Having won numerous prestigious awards in the ski industry ».

== See also ==
- MSSI-Mont Saint-Sauveur International
- List of ski areas and resorts in Canada
