= Firekites =

Australian band

- Origin: Newcastle, New South Wales, Australia
- Genres: Folk, pop, indie
- Years active: 2008–present
- Labels: Spunk, Own Records
- Members: Tim McPhee; Jason Tampake; Ben Howe; Pegs Adams
- Past members: Jane Tyrell

Firekites are an Australian band from Newcastle, New South Wales. The group is composed of Tim McPhee, Ben Howe and Pegs Adams with other members including Jane Tyrrell (The Herd) and Jason Tampake (Josh Pyke). They released their debut album, The Bowery (produced by Wayne Connolly), in 2008 which has had significant airtime on national broadcaster Triple J. Their chalk-drawn animation (by Lucinda Schreiber) video for "Autumn Story" was nominated for a J Award in 2009.

In 2023, writer Andrew McMillen of The Australian included the 2008 band's album The Bowery in a list of albums that he considers "flawless" from recent decades. He wrote:

Rarely are debuts as fully formed and beguiling as that issued by Newcastle band Firekites, which centred shared male-female vocals, pretty acoustic guitar tones, innovative percussion and stunning violin interjections. Best played in the small hours.

The group released its follow-up album Closing Forever Sky in 2014.

== Discography ==
- The Bowery - Spunk/EMI (URA245) (2008)
- Closing Forever Sky (2014)
