= Boomtown Records =

- Founded: 2002
- Founder: Jaddan Comerford
- Status: inactive
- Distributor: Shock Records
- Country of origin: Australia
- Location: Richmond, Victoria, Australia
- Official website: Boomtownrecords.com.au

Boomtown Records was an independent record label founded by Jaddan Comerford in October 2002 and based in Melbourne, Australia. In 2011 the label was rebranded with Staple Management to new company, UNFD.

== History ==
The label was established by Jaddan Comerford when he was 18, after being inspired by thriving independent labels like Epitaph Records.

It is incredible how far everything has come. This is literally something I started in my bedroom when I was eighteen. I had just started a degree at university and I absolutely loved music, so I wanted to do something that involved both of those things.

— Jaddan Comerford

After operating the label out of his basement, Comerford moved into an office building in 2005. In March 2006 Comerford established the Staple Group with two arms; that being Artist Management (Behind Crimson Eyes, The Getaway Plan, Horsell Common and Antiskeptic) and Marketing, which focuses on direct, street level and viral internet marketing (with clients including Warner Music Australia and Hurley Clothing).

Boomtown had its first ever 'Boomtown Showdown Tour' in May 2005, showcasing the label's talent (Behind Crimson Eyes, Wishful Thinking, Angelas Dish and Sounds Like Chicken), which sold out to 800 people in Melbourne. In 2006 the 'Boomtown Showdown Tour' went national with eight shows on the east coast of Australia. The performance in Melbourne, featuring Horsell Common, The Getaway Plan, Angelas Dish, Wishful Thinking and In Fiction, was recorded and released on DVD. The 'Boomtown Showdown Tour' continued in 2007, featuring The Getaway Plan, In Fiction, The Amity Affliction and Elora Danan with thirteen dates across the east and west coasts of Australia, and included the first ever Boomtown Showdown shows in Western Australia.

== Boomtown bands ==
Behind Crimson Eyes

Behind Crimson Eyes (Melbourne) - Boomtown signed the band in late 2004, releasing the band's debut EP, Pavour Nocturnus in 2005. It entered the Australian Independent Record (AIR) charts at number two. The band's follow up, Prologue: The Art of War/Cherry Blossom Epitaph was also released by Boomtown in 2005, spending eight weeks in the Australian charts and peaking at #81. In August 2006 the band went on to sign with US heavy metal label, Roadrunner Records.

The Getaway Plan

The Getaway Plan (Melbourne) - Boomtown released the band's debut album Other Voices, Other Rooms in February 2008. The album debuted at number 14 on the ARIA charts, number three on the Australian ARIA charts and number one on the AIR charts, where it stayed for over a year. The second single from the album, "Where the City Meets the Sea", peaked at number 28 on the ARIA singles charts. The Getaway Plan were nominated for 'Best Australian Independent Artist' at the 2008 Jägermeister AIR Awards. In February 2009 The Getaway Plan formally announced that it would be disbanding following final performances in March, although they have since reformed and released a new album.

Elora Danan

Elora Danan (Perth) - Boomtown released the band's debut Mini-Album We All Have Secrets in 2007 and they toured as part of the Boomtown Showdown in 2007. The band's debut album entitled In the Room Up There was released on 6 March 2009 on Boomtown Records. The label has released two singles from the album "Door, Up, Elevator" and "The Greater Good".

In Fiction

In Fiction (Adelaide) - Boomtown released both the band's EPs, The Four Letter Failure - which reached number 72 on the ARIA singles chart and Ghost which reached number 11. The band's debut album, The Forecast, was released in June 2008.

Horsell Common

Horsell Common (Melbourne) - Boomtown released their debut album The Rescue in September 2007, with the album reaching number six on the AIR album charts. The first single from the album, "Satellite Wonderland", reaching number one on the AIR singles chart.

Mere Theory

Mere Theory (Adelaide) - In June 2007 Boomtown signed Mere Theory and released their debut album 'Catalan Atlas' in September 2007.

Boomtown Records also have exclusive deals for the Australian releases of American artists Blackpool Lights, Lifetime, Copeland and Jonah Matranga.

== List of artists ==
Current We Are Unified roster

- The Amity Affliction
- The Bride
- Dream On, Dreamer
- Buried in Verona
- Deez Nuts
- The Getaway Plan
- House Vs. Hurricane
- Miami Horror
- Northlane
- The Summer Set
- We Are Augustines
- We Came As Romans

Former:

- Angelas Dish
- Behind Crimson Eyes
- Elora Danan
- Sounds Like Chicken
- Horsell Common
- In Fiction
- Mere Theory
- Philadelphia Grand Jury (Boomtown Deal through Normal People Making Hits)
- Wishful Thinking
- Wherewolves (formerly A Year To Remember)

One-Off International Releases

- Copeland
- Blackpool Lights
- The Dear Hunter
- Jonah Matranga
- Envy on the Coast
- The Receiving End of Sirens

== Boomtown releases ==
Cat. #	Artist	Title	Format	Release date
BTR001	Wishful Thinking	Standing Still (2003)	CD/LP	First official Boomtown release
BTR002	Wishful Thinking	I Don't Need You (2003)	CD single	
BTR003	Sounds Like Chicken	Global Domination (2003)	CD single	
BTR004	Wishful Thinking	Kicking Goals, Banging Gongs and High Fives All Round! (2004)	CD/LP	
BTR005	Sounds Like Chicken	...Like a Cannonball to the Ocean Floor (2004)	CD/LP	Debut Album
BTR006	Various Artists	Attack of the Bee Killers (2004)	CD Compilation	
BTR007	Behind Crimson Eyes	Pavour Nocturnus (2005)	CD/DVD	Boomtown's Breakthrough Artist & Release
BTR008	Angelas Dish	Lie Die (2005)	CD/EP	Debut EP
BTR009	Wishful Thinking	"The Day You Went Away" (2005)	CD single	
BTR010	Sounds Like Chicken	"Take a Bullet to the Grave" (2005)	CD single	
BTR011	Behind Crimson Eyes	Prologue: The Art of War/Cherry Blossom Epitaph (2005)	CD single	Double A-side Single
BTR012	The Getaway Plan	Hold Conversation (2006)	CD/EP	Debut EP
BTR013	Angelas Dish	My Body Is An Ashtray (2006)	CD/EP	
BTR014	In Fiction	The Four Letter Failure (2006)	CD/EP	Debut EP
BTR015	Wishful Thinking	You Never See It Coming (2006)	CD/EP	
BTR016	Jonah Matranga	The Three Sketchys (1999-2005) (2006)	CD/LP	First International Release
BTR017	Horsell Common	Satellite Wonderland (2006)	CD/EP	
BTR018	Various Artists	Boomtown Showdown 2006 (2006)	DVD	First Official Boomtown Showcase
BTR019	In Fiction	Ghost (2007)	CD/EP	
BTR020	Behind Crimson Eyes	Scream Out Your Name to the Night (2007)	Re-Release CD/DVD	
BTR021	Copeland	In Motion (2007)	CD/LP	
BTR022	Mere Theory	"Gracefully" (2007)	7"	Debut Single with B-Sides
BTR023	Mere Theory	Catalan Atlas (2007)	CD/LP	Debut Album Release on 1 September 2007
BTR024	Elora Danan	We All Have Secrets (2007)	Mini-Album [EP]	Debut Release on 18 August 2007
BTR025	Blackpool Lights	This Town's Disaster (2007)	CD/LP	Album Release on 18 August 2007
BTR026	Horsell Common	"Good from Afar" (2007)	CD single	Single Released 1 September 2007
BTR027	Horsell Common	The Rescue (2007)	CD/LP	Debut Album Released 29 September 2007
BTR028	Lifetime	Lifetime (2007)	CD/LP	Decaydance / Fueled By Ramen / Boomtown Records
BTR029	The Getaway Plan	"Streetlight" (2007)	CD single	First Single from 'Other Voices, Other Rooms'
BTR030	The Getaway Plan	Other Voices, Other Rooms (2008)	CD/LP	Debut Album Released 9 February 2008
BTR031	The Getaway Plan	"Where the City Meets the Sea" (2008)	CD single	Second Single from 'Other Voices, Other Rooms'
BTR032	In Fiction	Liar, Liar (2008)	CD/EP	
BTR033	In Fiction	The Forecast (2008)	CD/LP	Debut album
BTR034	A Year to Remember (Wherewolves)	Targets (2008)	CD/EP	Debut album
BTR036	The Amity Affliction	Severed Ties (2008)	CD/LP	Debut album
