= Philadelphia Grand Jury =

- Also known as: The Philly Jays
- Origin: Sydney, Australia
- Genres: Indie rock, punk, soul
- Years active: 2008–2011, 2013–2020, 2024–2025
- Label: Normal People Making Hits/Boomtown Records
- Past members: Simon Berckelman; Joel Beeson; Dave Jenkins, Jr. Dan Williams; Sullivan Patten; Calvin Welch; Ivan Lisyak
- Website: http://www.philadelphiagrandjury.com.au

Philadelphia Grand Jury, sometimes known as “The Philly Jays”, were an Australian band from Sydney. The band revolved around the partnership of Joel Beeson (bass, keyboards, guitar, backing vocals) and Simon Berckelman (lead vocals, guitar), who used the stage names MC Bad Genius and Berkfinger respectively. The band performed with several drummers, the most recent of which was Dave Jenkins, Jr. The band self-described as playing music that blends "indie, punk and soul."

== Biography ==
=== 2001–2009: Hope Is for Hopers ===
Beeson originally formed a band called Johnson in 2001 with Berckelman, before creating the indie label Motherlovin' Records in 2004. Subsequent bands included Malcolm X and the Black Auditorium, and Berkfinger and the Sweats, with the latter combining to form Philadelphia Grand Jury in early 2008. In May 2009, the band signed a joint venture deal with Boomtown Records.

In June 2009, the band released "Going to the Casino (Tomorrow Night)" where it received significant play on Triple J and featured on the television mini-series Underbelly: A Tale of Two Cities, also appearing on the soundtrack album. The band's debut album, Hope Is for Hopers, was released on 25 September 2009, reaching No. 34 on the ARIA Albums Chart.

Williams departed from the group in September 2009. Williams' position was temporarily filled by Ivan Lisyak, aka 'Emergency Ivan', before a permanent replacement – American session musician Calvin Welch (Earth, Wind and Fire, Sonny Stitt) – joined the band. At the fourth annual AIR Awards, held on 22 November 2009, Philadelphia Grand Jury won an award for "Best Independent Single or EP" with their single "Going to the Casino".

=== 2010–2011: Break up ===
In October 2010, the band announced that Welch had left the band, as the 'rigours of the road have proved too arduous for the 55-year-old drummer'. Welch's replacement was Berlin-based/Brisbane-born Sullivan Patten (I Heart Hiroshima), who performed with the band on their tour of the United Kingdom, the United States and Australia. Patten finished touring with the band in January 2011.

In March 2011, news surfaced that the band had abandoned work on the follow-up to Hope is for Hopers. When FasterLouder sought a follow-up, they were met with the following statement in regards to the band's current status. "Philadelphia Grand Jury are on something of a hiatus. No need to make it a bigger deal than it is. Creative individuals tend to have more than one project and Philadelphia Grand Jury is just one of Berkfinger's musical personas. Berkfinger is currently focusing on other projects, including moving his recording gear to Berlin to finish the recordings that he has been working on in the various incarnations of studios that he has built over the years." On 2 November 2011 the band posted on their Facebook page that the band had broken up.

=== 2013–present: Summer of Doom, second hiatus and reunion ===
After the split, Beeson moved onto production and remix work under the moniker of Boyhood, while Berckelman relocated to Berlin and began working on a solo project entitled Feelings. Feelings released their debut album, Be Kind Unwind in October 2013. In 2013, Berckelman assembled Beeson and Williams to join him on tour in Australia under the Feelings moniker. The three playing together for the first time in nearly four years immediately sparked rumours of a Philadelphia Grand Jury reunion, which were confirmed with a midnight performance by the band at the 2013 BIGSOUND festival in Brisbane. The band then announced a tour for December 2013, incorporating songs for both Feelings and Philadelphia Grand Jury across two sets.

In late 2014, it was revealed the band would be heading to Berlin in 2015 to record new material. The sessions resulted in the band's second studio album, which had the working title of Ulterior Motif. A new single, "Crashing and Burning, Pt. II," was released in August 2015. The album, now titled Summer of Doom, was released in October 2015. The band would continue to tour infrequently across the remainder of the 2010s, but no new music surfaced until 2019 with the release of stand-alone single "$10K". A second single, "Nervous Breakdown", followed in 2020. The band entered a second hiatus period due to COVID-19, but announced their reunion in 2024 to commemorate the 15-year anniversary of Hope is for Hopers and play a select run of shows from November 2024 to March 2025.

== Discography ==
=== Albums ===
Title	Details	Peak chart positions
Title	Details	AUS
Hope Is for Hopers	Released: October 2009; Label: Boomtown (BTR 046); Format: CD, CD+DVD	34
Summer of Doom	Released: 2015; Label: Normal People Making Hits (Normal003cd, Normal003lp); Format: CD, LP	—

=== Singles ===
Year	Title	Album
2009	"Going to the Casino"	Hope Is for Hopers
2009	"The Good News"	Hope Is for Hopers
2010	"I Don't Want to Party (Party)"	Hope Is for Hopers
2010	"Save Our Town"	Hope Is for Hopers
2015	"Crashing and Burning, Pt. II"	Summer of Doom
2016	"Spend More Time"	Summer of Doom
2019	"$10K"	Non-album singles
2020	"Nervous Breakdown"	Non-album singles

== Awards ==
=== AIR Awards ===
The Australian Independent Record Awards (commonly known informally as AIR Awards) is an annual awards night to recognise, promote and celebrate the success of Australia's Independent Music sector.

Year	Nominee / work	Award	Result
2009	"Going to the Casino"	Best Independent Single/EP	Won
2010	"The Good News"	Best Independent Single/EP	Nominated
2010	Philadelphia Grand Jury	Breakthrough Independent Artist	Nominated
2010	Philadelphia Grand Jury	Most Popular Independent Artist	Nominated

=== J Award ===
The J Awards are an annual series of Australian music awards that were established by the Australian Broadcasting Corporation's youth-focused radio station Triple J. They commenced in 2005.

Year	Nominee / work	Award	Result
2009	Hope is for Hopers	Australian Album of the Year	Nominated
