= Kid Sam =

Australian musical duo

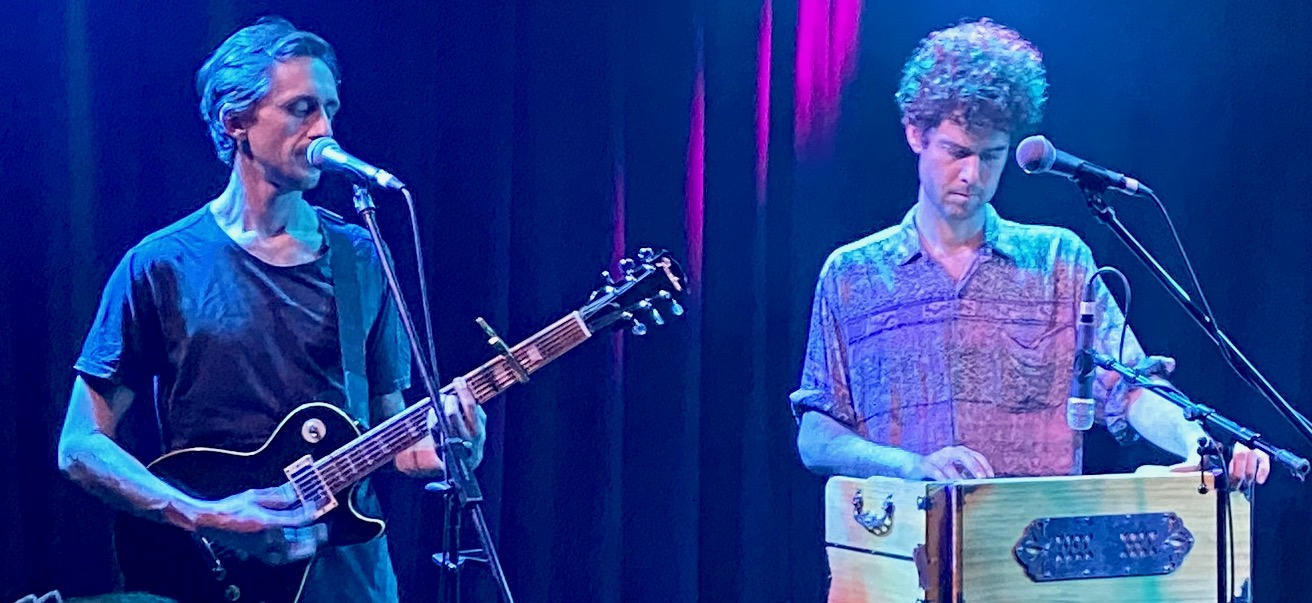
- Kid Sam performing in 2024

Background information
- Origin: Melbourne, Victoria, Australia
- Genres: Rock
- Years active: 2006–2010, 2022–present
- Label: Two Bright Lakes
- Spinoffs: Seagull, Otouto, Where Were You at Lunch
- Members: Kieran Ryan; Kishore Ryan
- Website: Kid Sam on Facebook

Kid Sam are an Australian rock duo from Melbourne consisting of cousins Kieran (vocals and guitar) and Kishore Ryan (drums). The band's first performance was in January 2006, and they started getting airplay on Triple J's "unearthed" program in 2008. Their debut self-titled album was released in 2009 to positive reviews and they went on their first national headline tour in 2010. Kid Sam were nominated for a J Award and the Australian Music Prize. Their final live performance was in August 2010 in Melbourne supporting Grizzly Bear and Here We Go Magic at the Palais Theatre in Melbourne. Both cousins moved on to other projects, with Kishore drumming for bands such as Seagull, Otouto and Where Were You At Lunch since then. Kieran Ryan spent 2011-12 recording a self-titled solo album released in 2013. The duo played a one-off show at their record label's party in April 2015.

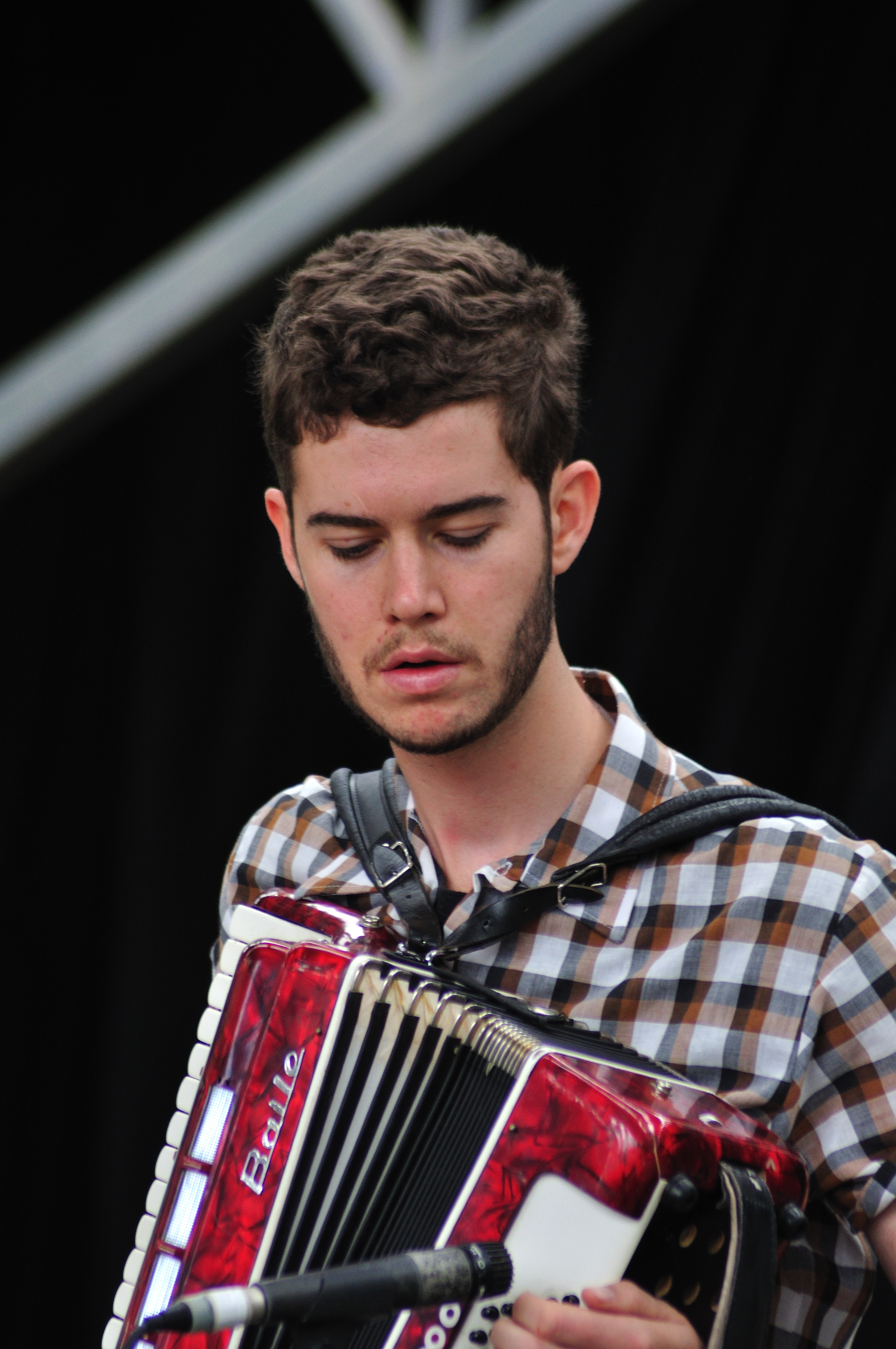
Kid Sam performing at Meredith Music Festival in 2009

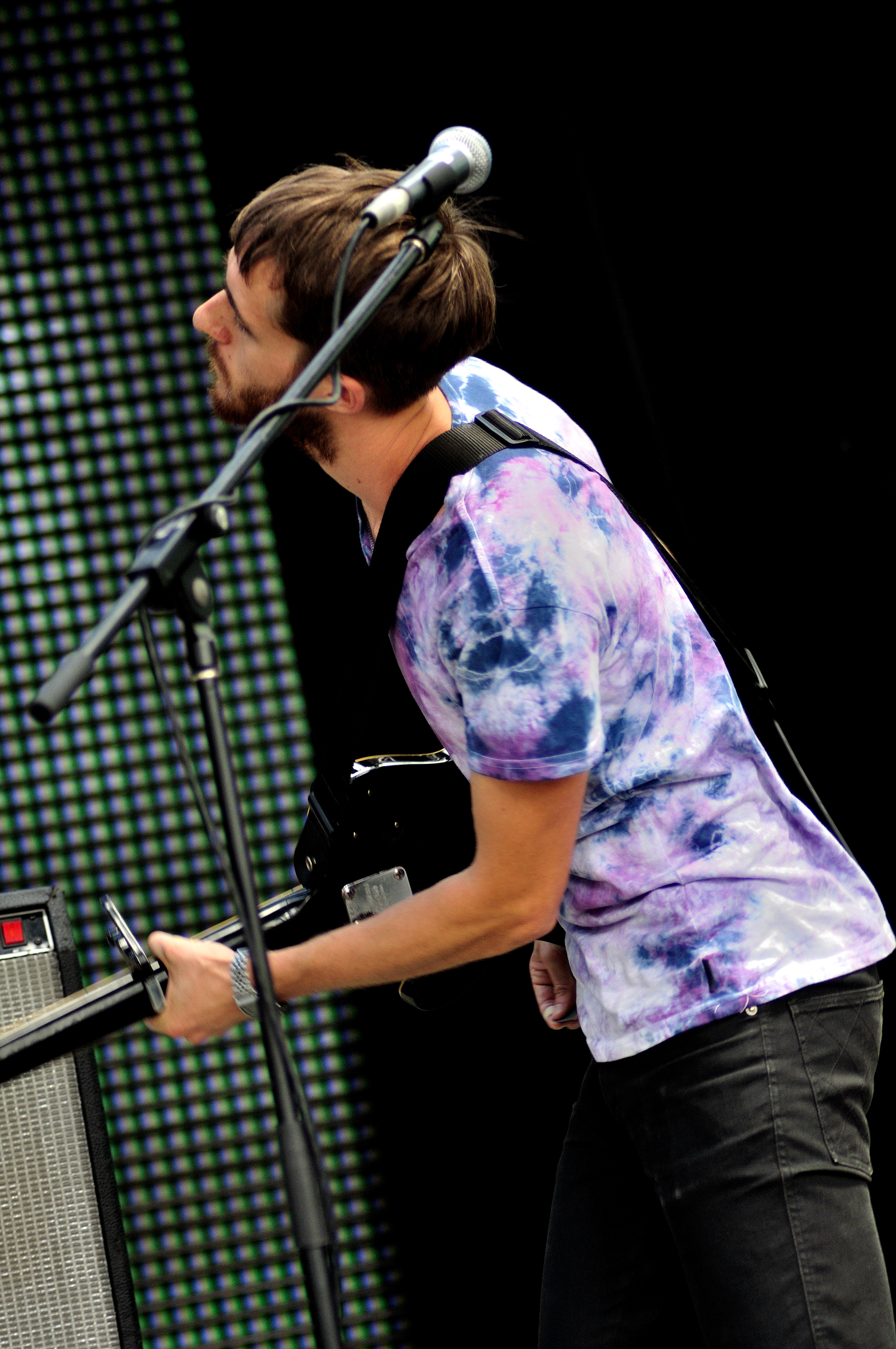

In October 2022, the band posted to their long-dormant Facebook page about a "12 year reunion" show alongside Carla dal Forno at the Bridge Hotel in Castlemaine, with a promise of more to come if it "goes well". In mid-2024 they announced their formal reunion show would be at the Northcote Social Club in Melbourne on 20 September.

== Discography ==
- Kid Sam / Psuche - Tell Tell / We're Mostly Made Of Water (2008, split single) - Two Bright Lakes
- Kid Sam (2009) - Two Bright Lakes

== Awards and nominations ==
=== Australian Music Prize ===
The Australian Music Prize (the AMP) is an annual award of $30,000 given to an Australian band or solo artist in recognition of the merit of an album released during the year of the award. The commenced in 2005.

Year	Nominee / work	Award	Result
2009	Kid Sam	Australian Music Prize	Nominated

=== J Awards ===
The J Awards is an annual series of Australian music awards that were established by the Australian Broadcasting Corporation's youth-focused radio station Triple J. They commenced in 2005.

Year	Nominee / work	Award	Result
J Awards of 2009	Kid Sam	Australian Album of the Year	Nominated
