= My Body Is an Ashtray =

EP by Angelas Dish
- Released: July 2006
- Genre: Indie pop
- Length: 13:38
- Label: Boomtown Records

Angelas Dish chronology
Lie Die (2005)	My Body Is an Ashtray (2006)	Soft November (2007)

My Body Is an Ashtray is the third EP by Australian indie pop band Angelas Dish. The EP was released in July 2006, through Boomtown Records, and it peaked at number 94 on the ARIA singles chart; becoming the band's first charting release.

== Track listing ==
No.	Title	Length
1.	"When I'm Gone"	2:44
2.	"My Screaming Heart"	3:32
3.	"Lock You Out"	3:56
4.	"Just a Game"	3:28

== Charts ==
Chart (2006)	Peak position
Australia (ARIA)	94

== Release history ==
Country	Date	Format	Label	Catalogue
Australia	July 2006	Digital download CD	Boomtown Records	BTR013
