= Wishful Thinking (Australian band) =

Australian band

- Origin: Launceston, Tasmania, Australia
- Genres: Pop punk, punk rock
- Years active: 1997–2006, 2019–Present,
- Labels: Boomtown
- Members: Carl Jackson (guitar, vocals); Lachie Jackson (bass, vocals, guitar); Leigh Thompson (drums, vocals); Alistair Elkins (bass, vocals)
- Past members: Brendan Lichtendonk (drums 98-00); Andrew 'FROG' Hosking (drums 00-01); Jaymes Redsell (drums 2001); Carlos Echeverria (bass 2002-2003)

Wishful Thinking (or Wishful) are an Australian pop-punk band that formed in 1998, disbanded in 2006 and reformed in 2019. The line-up includes Carl W. Jackson on guitar and lead vocals, Alistair Elkins on bass guitar, Lachlan Jackson on guitar, and Leigh Thompson on drums. Brothers Carl & Lachlan Jackson formed the band (with Lachlan on bass) with their neighbour Brendan Lichtendonk on drums in 1998 whilst living in Launceston, Tasmania. Carl & Lachlan relocated the band to Melbourne in 2001 and Leigh Thompson joined on drums. They were one of Australia's "buzz" punk/pop acts and were the first band signed to Boomtown Records in 2002. Wishful Thinking's musical style was pop punk and followed in the style of bands such as Blink 182 and New Found Glory.

== History ==
In the year 2000, Wishful Thinking were signed to local independent record label Spoon Records and toured Australia with US band All Star United. Shortly after, they played mainstage at Australia's Sonfest in Victoria and QLD. It was at this festival that Carl and Lachlan met Leigh Thompson who would later join the band on drums. Wishful then went on to support Millencolin and Area 7 at the Metro in Melbourne. Lachlan left the band at the end of 2001 and Carlos Echeverria joined shortly after on Bass Guitar. Carl, Leigh, and Carlos recorded Wishful Thinkings first Album Standing Still in 2002 which would go on to be the first record released by Boomtown Records. Wishful Thinking received rotation on the radio stations Triple M and Triple J, with their single "I Don't Need You" which was released in 2003.

Carlos left the band in early 2004 and Alistair Elkins Joined on Bass guitar. Carl, Leigh, and Alistair recorded the Album Kicking Goal, Banging Gongs & High Fives All Round and embarked on a national tour with Label-Mates Sounds Like Chicken that included shows in Brisbane, Sydney, Melbourne, Adelaide, and Perth. Their 2004 single "The Day You Went Away" was also featured on Triple J.

During their 13-year hiatus, the band reformed for a once-off show in August 2009 at the Adelaide Uni Bar with S.T.R.

Wishful Thinking also have shared stages and toured with bands such as MXPX, The Getaway Plan, In Fiction, Angelas Dish, Kisschasy, Rufio, Gyroscope, Relient K, The O.C. Supertones, the Porkers, Mach Pelican, and Antiskeptic.

== Critical reception ==
Tim Cashmere of Undercover News reviewed their debut album, Standing Still (2003); he described them as a "Christian-punk act" and felt the album was "none-too-shabby, albeit none-too-original either... The god-fearing punk beats of Wishful Thinking makes an interesting point of difference." Ben Seifu of vibewire.net noticed that "the production is quite professional without being too smooth or processed. The drums in particular are captured reasonably well. But beyond that Standing Still is pretty standard pop punk stuff." Jasper Lee of Oz Music Project opined that it "oozes of punk pop goodness that echoes heroes of said genre such as MXPX. The band's strength lies in their combination of consistent punk power chords with a lyrical depth underpinning their spiritual beliefs."

Steph Brincat of Oz Music Project reviewed the group's second album, Kicking Goals, Banging Gongs & High Five All Round, rating it at four out of five due to the "classic pop-punk sound that we have all come to know and love, without making it sound horrible and generic, and I assure you that I am not being sarcastic or ironic. The music is tight and although it doesn’t stray from the usual pop-punk recipe of repetitive yet catchy bass, guitar and drum explosion, there is variation in their tunes such as interesting little guitar licks and bass solos."

== Reunion and Reformation ==
In December 2018 Wishful Thinking were featured on Radio Station Triple J's Short, Fast, Loud program of Great Australian Bands that had broken Up. This led to a reunion tour in June 2019 that saw Wishful Thinking reforming as a four piece with original member Lachlan Jackson returning to the band on guitar. They played three shows in Melbourne, Adelaide and Sydney with Aussie bands Area 7 and The Porkers. Wishful released a Best-Of compilation album, Dreams Get Left in the Past, to coincide with the reunion. The shows marked 20 years since the release of their first EP, At Last. In 2020 Wishful released Loving Life, a complete collection of both of their full-length albums and 3 EP's. They also released an EP When Mountains Are Too High that consisted of five demo's they had recorded shortly before they broke up. In May 2020 Wishful Thinking released their first new song in 14 years called 'Time to Be Alone' which was first Aired on Triple J on May 22.

== Discography ==
- At Last (1999) E.P.
- ...and then there were two (2001) E.P.
- Standing Still (2003) L.P., Boomtown Records
- I Don't Need You (2003) single, Boomtown Records
- Kicking Goals, Banging Gongs & High Five All Round (2004) L.P., Boomtown Records
- The Day You Went Away single (2004), Boomtown Records
- You Never See It Coming (2006) E.P., Boomtown Records
- Dreams Get Left in the Past (2019) L.P., Independent
- Loving Life: The Complete Collection (2020) L.P., Independent
- When Mountains Are Too High (2020) E.P., Independent
- Time To Be Alone (2020) Single, Independent
