= Finch discography =

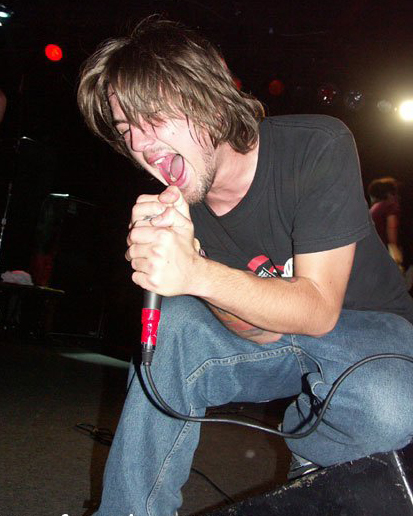
- Vocalist Nate Barcalow
- Studio albums: 3
- EPs: 3
- Live albums: 2
- Singles: 8
- Music videos: 6
- Acoustic album: 1

The discography of the American post-hardcore band Finch consists of three studio albums, two live albums, one acoustic album, three extended plays, eight singles and six music videos.

== Albums ==
=== Studio albums ===
List of studio albums, with selected details, chart positions and sales
Title	Album details	Peak chart positions					Sales
Title	Album details	US	US Heat.	AUS	FRA	UK	Sales
What It Is to Burn	Released: March 12, 2002; Label: Drive-Thru/MCA; Format: CD, CS, 2xLP, DD	99	1	—	113	177	US: 200,000+; WW: 400,000+
Say Hello to Sunshine	Released: June 7, 2005; Label: Drive-Thru/Geffen; Format: CD, CS, 2xLP, DD	24	—	83	170	48	
Back to Oblivion	Released: September 30, 2014; Label: Razor & Tie; Format: CD, LP, DD	103	—	—	—	161	
"—" denotes a recording that did not chart or was not released in that territory.

=== Live albums ===
- A Far Cry from Home (2009, In-n-Out)
- What It Is to Burn – X Live (2014, Tragic Hero)

=== Acoustic albums ===
- Steel, Wood and Whiskey (2015, self-released)

== Extended plays ==
List of EPs, with selected details
Title	Details
Falling into Place	Released: October 9, 2001; Label: Drive-Thru; Format: CD, LP
Finch	Released: July 22, 2008; Label: Finch Music Inc.; Format: CD, DD
Epilogue	Released: December 17, 2010; Label: Self-released; Formats: DD

== Singles ==
Title	Year	Peak chart positions			Album
Title	Year	US Alt	US Main	UK	Album
"What It Is to Burn"	2003	15	35	—	What It Is to Burn
"Letters to You"	2003	—	—	39	What It Is to Burn
"New Beginnings"	2003	—	—	—	What It Is to Burn
"Worms of the Earth"	2003	—	—	—	Underworld Soundtrack
"Bitemarks and Bloodstains"	2005	—	—	82	Say Hello to Sunshine
"Bury White" (Far cover)	2010	—	—	—	Non-album single
"Two Guns to the Temple"	2014	—	—	—	Back to Oblivion
"Anywhere But Here"	2014	—	—	—	Back to Oblivion
"—" denotes a release that did not chart.

== Other appearances ==
Year	Song	Album	Label
2002	"What It Is to Burn" (demo)	Plea For Peace/Take Action, Vol. 2	Sub City Records
2003	"Letters to You" (acoustic)	Punk Goes Acoustic	Fearless Records
2005	"When the Lights Go Out" (Oingo Boingo cover)	Dead Bands Party	Indianola Records

== Music videos ==
Year	Title	Director(s)	Album
2002	"Letters to You"	Brad Scott & Richard Reines	What It is to Burn
2002	"What It Is to Burn"	Alexander Kosta	What It is to Burn
2003	"Worms of the Earth"	Jeff Richter	Underworld soundtrack
2005	"Bitemarks and Bloodstains"	Michael Palmieri	Say Hello to Sunshine
2014	"Anywhere But Here"	Dylan Bell	Back to Oblivion
2015	"Play Dead"	Daniel Wonacott	Back to Oblivion
