= Hordern Pavilion =

Australian entertainment venue

Coordinates: 33°53′38″S 151°13′27″E

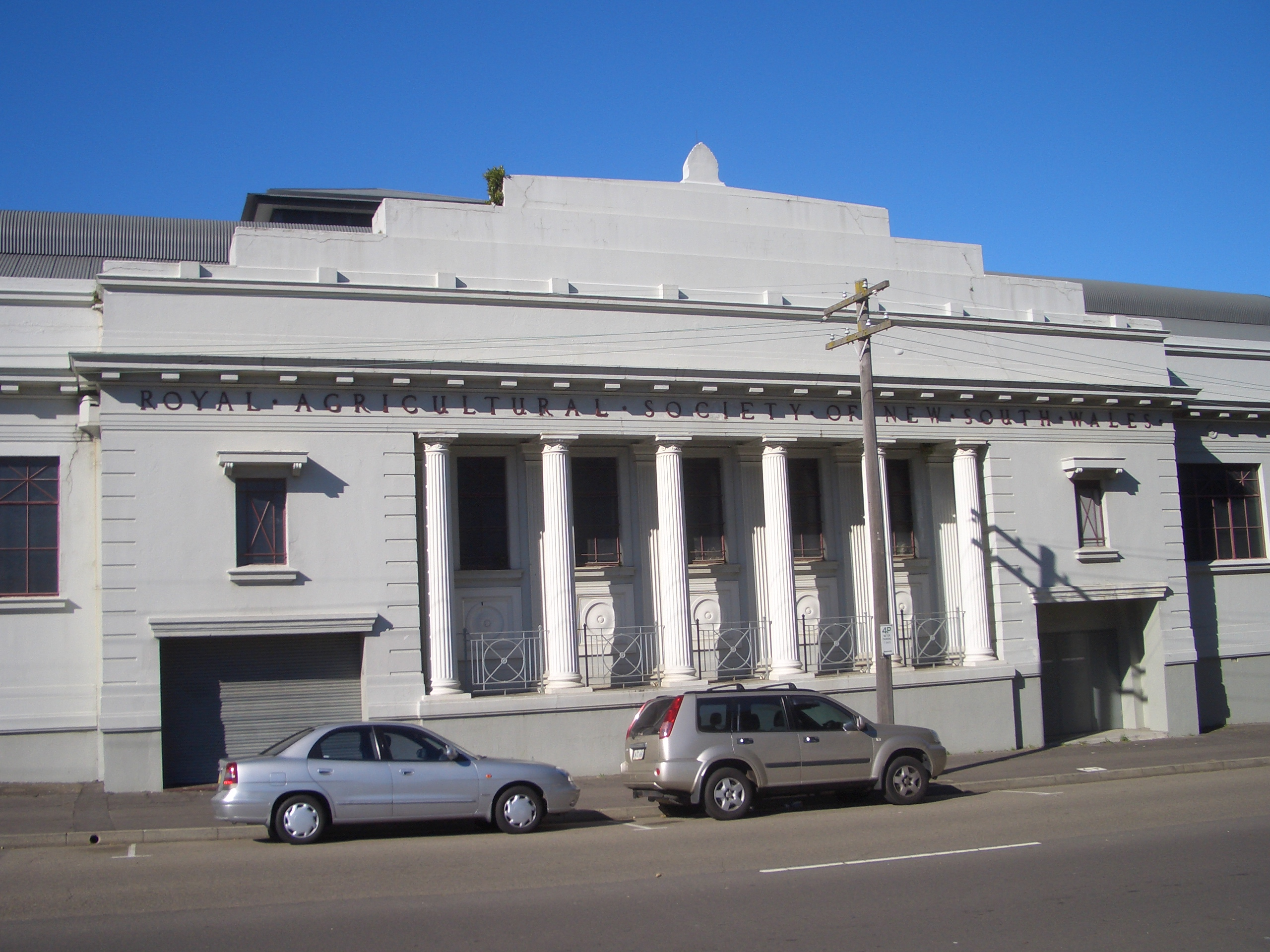
- Interactive map of Hordern Pavilion
- Address: 1 Driver Ave; Moore Park, NSW 2021; Australia
- Location: Entertainment Quarter
- Owner: Centennial Park & Moore Park Trust
- Operator: Playbill Venue Management
- Capacity: 5,500

Construction
- Opened: 2 April 1924
- Renovated: 1972, 1999
- Cost: £45,000 ($4.14 million in 2022 dollars)
- Architects: Trenchard Smith & Maisey

Website
- thehordern.com.au

Hordern Pavilion (known locally as The Hordern) is a building located in Moore Park, Sydney, New South Wales, Australia, on the grounds of the old Sydney Showground. Now known as a sports venue, dance party and music concert venue, the Hordern Pavilion was originally constructed for the Royal Agricultural Society of New South Wales to meet the increasing demands for exhibition space at the Royal Easter Show.

== History ==
The Pavilion was named in honour of the enterprising retail Hordern family, Anthony Hordern & Sons, and Samuel Hordern, who was the president of the Royal Agricultural Society from 1915 to 1941. The building is designed in the Inter-War Academic Classical Style with rendered masonry featuring classical detailing inside and out, including fluted Doric columns, a parapet and an imposing vaulted roof with lantern tower. Designed by Northern Sydney architecture firm Trenchard Smith & Maisey, it cost £45,000 to originally build. The pavilion was officially opened on 2 April 1924 by the Premier, Sir George Fuller. The pavilion has also been the site of championship boxing over the years with, among others, former World Champion Jeff Fenech fighting at the venue.

== Performances ==
- Manfred Mann's Earth Band – 21 May 1972
- Jethro Tull – 11–13 July 1972, 3–5 August 1974 and 14–15 and 19–20 September 1977
- Cat Stevens – 29–30 August 1972 and 1–2 June 1974, with Linda Lewis
- Three Dog Night – 3 December 1972, with the Guess Who and the La De Da's
- Black Sabbath – 16–17 January 1973, with Buffalo and Ticket and 5, 9–11 and 16 November 1974, with AC/DC
- Slade – 6 February 1973 and 21 and 24 February 1974
- Yes – 26–27 March 1973
- Frank Zappa – 23–26 June and 6–8 July 1973, with The Mothers of Invention and Albatross and 20–21 January 1976
- The Jackson 5 – 2 July 1973
- Santana – 25–26 July 1973, 15–16 February 1976, with Sebastian Hardie and 8–10 October 1979, with Eddie Money
- Status Quo – 1 September 1973, 20 November 1974, with Montrose, 2–3 and 9 October 1975, with Snafu, 4–5 December 1976, 21–24 July 1978, 9–10 May 2006 with Deep Purple, 9–10 March 2010 and 27 March 2013
- Procol Harum – 10 September 1973
- Gary Glitter & The Glitter Band – 23 October 1973, with Mississippi
- T. Rex – 3 November 1973
- Little Richard – 13 January 1974
- The Faces – 9 February 1974
- Hush – 17 February 1974, with Sherbet, Geordie and The 69'ers and 4 May 1975, with AC/DC
- Stevie Wright & The Allstars – 24 March and 25 April 1974, with The Le De Das
- Focus – 13–14 July 1974, with Mason's Cure and 31 May and 10 June 1975, with Sebastian Hardie
- Frank Sinatra – 15–16 July 1974
- Lou Reed – 13, 21 and 25 August 1974, with AC/DC, 15, 19 and 21 July 1975 and 29 October 1977
- Muddy Waters – 5 September 1974
- Bo Diddley – 26 September 1974, with Lobby Loyde
- The Mahavishnu Orchestra – 12 and 17 November 1974
- Uriah Heep – 19 and 27 November 1974
- The Skyhooks – 16 December 1974, with AC/DC, 27 March, with Buster Brown and Phil Manning, 22 June 1975, 8 August 1976, with Ol' 55 and 10 December 1977, with Rose Tattoo and The Kevin Borich Express
- The Eagles – 22 January 1975
- The Rory Gallagher Band – 8 February 1975 and 21 February 1980
- Wishbone Ash – 2 and 5 March 1975
- Tangerine Dream – 16 March 1975
- Bad Company – 17 and 19 March 1975, with Chariot
- Split Enz – 29 and 31 March and 23 April 1975 and 16 June 1980, with Matt Finish
- Chuck Berry – 3 April 1975
- Roxy Music – 15 April 1975 with Richard Clapton and 23 April 1975 with Split Enz
- Eric Clapton – 17, 19–20 and 22 April 1975, with The Renée Geyer Band and 13–14 and 20–21 November 1984
- Leo Sayer – 21 May 1975, 20 March 1976 and 5 May 2012, with Dragon
- Sweet – 18 and 28 August 1975
- The Electric Light Orchestra – 1 September 1975
- John Denver – 6–7 October 1975
- Ray Charles – 20–21 October 1975
- Wings – 7–8 November 1975
- Deep Purple – 19–21 November 1975 and 9–10 May 2006, with Status Quo
- AC/DC – 24 December 1975, with The Skyhooks and Ol' 55 and 12 December 1976, with Stars and Punkz
- Neil Diamond – 23–25 February 1976
- Queen – 17–18 April 1976, with The Ray Burton Band and Taste
- Perry Como – 4–5 May 1976
- Sherbet – 27 June 1976, with The Ted Mulry Gang and 12 June and 31 July 1977
- America – 14–15 July 1976, with The Ray Burton Band
- Little Feat – 16 and 18 July 1976
- B.B. King – 9 October 1976 and 14 May 1997
- Rainbow – 11 and 16 November 1976, with Buffalo
- The Robin Trower Band – 8 and 11 February 1977
- Rod Stewart – 18–19 February 1977, with Air Supply and 12–13 February 1979
- Jackson Browne – 24 and 28 February and 12 March 1977, with Maria Muldaur
- Jon English – 10 May 1977
- Bryan Ferry – 15–16 May and 15 and 19 July 1977
- Tina Turner – 2 September 1977
- 10cc – 12 September 1977
- Fleetwood Mac – 17 November 1977 and 27–28 February and 15–17 March 1980
- The Angels – 9 December 1977, 8 November 1978, 6 September 1980, with Jo Jo Zep & The Falcons and Outline, 9 July, with Rose Tattoo and The Choirboys and 28 October, with Rose Tattoo, Richard Clapton and The Machinations, 1983, 24–25 August 1990, with Cheap Trick, 30 August 1992, with The Poor and Rhinobucket and 27 June 2008
- Rose Tattoo – 1 January 1978, 23 and 30 April 1982 and 5 October 2007
- Billy Joel – 11–12 and 15 April 1978
- Foreigner – 13 April 1978, with Cold Chisel
- Meat Loaf & His Neverland Express – 17 and 27 June 1978
- Bob Marley and the Wailers – 27–28 April 1979
- Cheap Trick – 25 October 1979, with Mi-Sex
- The Rumour – 13 November 1979
- Elton John – 25–28 November 1979, 30 November – 3 December 1980 and 16–21 March 1982
- Cold Chisel – 1 January and 31 August 1980, 1 March 1981, with INXS, 3–4, 6–7 and 23 June 2003, 27–28 and 30 January 2004 and 18 April 2012, with Lanie Lane
- The Police – 12 and 21–23 March 1980
- Boz Scaggs – 29 September – 1 October 1980
- The Little River Band – 30 January 1981
- Mi-Sex – 20 March 1981
- John Farnham – 23 April 1981
- Jerry Jeff Walker – 18 May 1981
- Adam and the Ants – 25 September 1981
- The Doobie Brothers – 4–5 November 1981 and 23 April 2014
- Devo – 4–6 February 1982 and 1 August 2008, with Regurgitator and The Eddy Current Suppression Ring
- The Kinks – 19 February 1982
- Duran Duran – 21–22 May 1982
- The Moving Pictures – 9 May 1982, with The Church and The Runners
- The Human League – 26 May 1982
- Hall & Oates – 19 November 1982
- The Church – 18 December 1982, with Dragon, The Little Heroes and The Honeymoon
- Dire Straits – 4–9 March 1983
- Joe Jackson – 7–8 May 1983
- INXS – 7 and 26 April 1984 and 27–28 January 1994, with Urge Overkill
- Midnight Oil – 15 June and 22–29 November 1984 and 1–4 October 1987
- The Cure – 11–12 October 1984
- Twisted Sister – 8 March 1985, with Boss
- Iron Maiden – 7 May 1985, with Boss and 23 October 1992
- Hunters & Collectors – 10 May 1985, with The Stranglers, 8 July 1988, with Paul Kelly and 14 October 1994, with The Baby Animals
- The Motels – 14 August 1985
- Jimmy Barnes – 15 December 1985 and 26–27 September 1989
- The Hooters – 19 December 1985
- Fairport Convention – 14 March 1986
- Stevie Ray Vaughan & Double Trouble – 16–17 March 1986, with The Fabulous Thunderbirds
- Johnny Winter – 6 July 1986
- Orchestral Manoeuvres in the Dark – 30 November and 21 December 1986
- Stryper – 19 June 1987
- Crowded House – 12–14 July 1987, 16 February 1994, with Ed Kuepper and 6 November 2010, with Oh Mercy
- Iggy Pop – 10 February 1989, with The Lime Spiders and The Sun Dogs
- The Hoodoo Gurus – 17 February 1989, with R.E.M. and The Go-Betweens and 15 March and 14–15 April, with You Am I and Redd Kross, 1994
- Metallica – 6 May 1989, with Mortal Sin
- Johnny Diesel & The Injectors – 15–16 August 1989
- Ten Years After – 17 August 1989
- Tone Lōc – 3–4 November 1989
- Ian Moss – 16 November 1989, with The Boom Crash Opera
- Paul Kelly – 25 January 1990
- Debbie Harry – 17 March 1990
- UB40 – 1 April 1990, 4 June 1994, with Chaka Demus & Pliers and 5 February 2008, with Maxi Priest and The Wailers Band
- Skid Row – 11 May 1990
- Erasure – 9 June 1990
- Soul II Soul – 12–13 July 1990
- Anthrax – 30 August 1990
- Depeche Mode – 31 August 1990
- The B-52's – 3–4 September 1990, 1 March 2004, 9 February 2017, with Simple Minds
- The Ramones – 26 January 1991
- Warrant – 27 April 1991
- Jesus Jones – 2 June 1991
- Motörhead – 21 June 1991
- Morrissey – 13 September 1991
- Jane's Addiction – 22 September 1991, with Killing Time and Pearls & Swine
- De La Soul – 12 October 1991
- The Big Day Out Music Festival – 25 January 1992
- The Steve Gilpin Benefit Concert – 16 February 1992
- The Baby Animals – 5 June 1992, with The Dan Reed Network
- The Black Crowes – 27 June 1992 and 30 March 2008
- Sepultura – 4 July 1992, 6 September 1994, with Sacred Reich and 9 June 1999
- Public Enemy – 14 August 1992, with Body Count
- The Red Hot Chili Peppers – 9–10 October 1992, with The Hard-Ons and Mantissa
- Ugly Kid Joe – 4 December 1992 and 9 October 1993
- Nick Cave and the Bad Seeds – 5 December 1992, 17 December 1994 and 11 March 2002
- The Prodigy – 31 December 1992, 9 March 2005, 24 January 2009, 3 March 2010, with Does It Offend You, Yeah?, 7 March 2013, with Borgore and DJ Mayumi Kai and 13-14 February 2025, with Moktar
- Arrested Development – 6–7 May 1993
- Faith No More – 8–9 May 1993, with Scarymother, 10–11 August 1995, 20–21 October 1997, with Shihad and 22 February 2010, with Eagles of Death Metal and Neil Hamburger
- Maxi Priest – 14 May 1993, with Belly Dance
- Living Colour – 18 September 1993
- Body Count – 23 October 1993, with The Dreamkillers
- Alice in Chains – 28 October 1993, with Suicidal Tendencies and The Poor
- East 17 – 18 March 1994
- Cypress Hill – 20 May 1994, with Ice Cube and 11 December 2004
- Culture Beat – 29 May 1994, with Cut 'N' Move and Melodie MC
- Kim Salmon and the Surrealists – 3 June 1994, with The Rollins Band
- Tumbleweed – 3 July 1994
- The Beastie Boys – 15 October 1994, with DJ Hurricane, Helmet and Def Wish Cast, 19–20 May 1999, with The Avalanches and B(if)tek and 28 January 2005, with Scribe
- Whitesnake – 21 October 1994, with Biohazzard
- Slayer – 28 March 1995, with Biohazzard and Allegiance, 29 August 2001, with Machine Head and Static-X, 17 April 2007, with Mastodon and Mortal Sin and 8 October 2009, with Megadeth and Double Dragon
- White Zombie – 10 October 1995
- The FBI Benefit Concert – 4 November 1995
- Rage Against the Machine – 27 January 1996, with The Jesus Lizard and Pollen
- Green Day – 7–8 February 1996, with The Living End and 18 October 2000
- Primus – 10 February 1996, with Spiderbait
- Björk – 5–7 March 1996
- Tool – 11 April 1996 and 11 April 1997, with Shihad
- Alanis Morissette – 3 May 1996
- Coolio – 8 May 1996, with House of Pain and Naughty by Nature
- The Smashing Pumpkins – 19–21 May 1996, with Def FX and 27 March 2008
- The Presidents of the United States of America – 31 July 1996, with Custard
- Garbage – 7 October 1996, with Pollyanna, 22 January 2002 and 23 September 2005, with Red Jezebel and Silo
- The Sex Pistols – 14 October 1996, with Skunk Anansie
- Bush – 30 October 1996, with The Superjesus
- Soundgarden – 30 January 1997, with You Am I
- KoЯn – 6 May 1997, with Non-Intentional Lifeform and 4 December 2010, with Shihad and Sydonia
- The Tea Party – 6 August and 6 September 1997, 12 February 2002, with Betchadupa and 21 July 2012
- Blur – 30 October 1997, with Glide
- The Offspring – 1 December 1997, with The Living End and 20 June 2004, with Something Corporate and Bodyjar
- Silverchair – 6 December 1997, with Magic Dirt and 14 August 1999, with Placebo and Pre.shrunk
- The Irresponsathon Music Festival – 7 December 1997
- Portishead – 27 April 1998
- Regurgitator – 10 September 1999, with Custard and The Resin Dogs
- The Chemical Brothers – 27 January 2000, 6 March 2002 and 27 January 2005
- Slipknot – 11 February 2000, with Segression and 29 January 2005, with Hatebreed and Daysend
- Ben Harper & The Innocent Criminals – 6 June 2000 and 10 and 14–16 April 2003
- Shihad – 28 July 2000
- Powderfinger – 18–20 October and 6 November 2000, with Something for Kate and 24 January 2005
- No Doubt – 23 October 2000 and 25 August 2002, with Waikiki
- Pennywise – 24 November 2000
- Pantera – 15 May 2001, with Corrosion of Conformity
- Coldplay – 8 August 2001, with Zed and 21–22 July 2003, with Betchadupa
- New Order – 23 January 2002, with The Severed Heads and 1 March 2012, with The Naked and Famous
- System of a Down – 24 and 26 January 2002 and 25 January 2005, with Rise Against and The Butterfly Effect
- Jamiroquai – 29 January 2002
- Incubus – 8 March 2002, 3 February 2012, with Papa vs Pretty and 11 April 2024, with Live
- Gomez – 23 July 2002
- Underworld – 22 January 2003
- The Foo Fighters – 23 January 2003
- The Counting Crows – 6 March 2003, with Butterfly 9
- Beck – 22 March 2003
- Moby – 28 March 2003, with Groove Terminator
- Jack Johnson – 15–16 April 2003, with G. Love & Special Sauce
- Audioslave – 23–24 April 2003
- John Mayer – 27 September 2003, with Lo-Tel
- The Roots – 17 October 2003, with The Jurassic 5, 27 December 2013, with A$AP Ferg and 2 January 2025, with Talib Kweli and Nai Palm
- The Melvins – 13 December 2003, with Tomahawk and Fantômas
- Queens of the Stone Age – 3 January 2004, with The Distillers and 21 February 2024, with Pond and Gut Health
- Evanescence – 11 January 2004, with Finger Eleven
- The Strokes – 21 January 2004, with Kings of Leon and The Mess Hall, 4 August 2006, with The Mercy Arms, 29 July 2010, with The Like and Gypsy & The Cat and 28-29 July 2022, with The Chats and The Lazy Eyes
- A Perfect Circle – 20–21 February 2004
- Blink-182 – 16–18 March and 6–9 September, with Sparta and After the Fall, 2004
- Placebo – 19 March 2004, with Elbow and 20 September 2006, with The Howling Bells
- Sean Paul – 26 March 2004
- Sevendust – 27 March 2004, with Sunk Loto and Full Scale
- Justin Timberlake – 16–18 June 2004
- The Fuzzy Winter Break Music Festival – 3 July 2004
- The John Butler Trio – 9 July 2004, with Missy Higgins, 17 December 2005, with Carus and The True Believers and Richard Walley, 17 August 2007, with Josh Pyke, 3 September 2010, with Blue King Brown and 11 April 2014, with Emma Louise
- The Jurassic 5 – 24 July 2004
- Pete Murray – 8 August 2004, with Missy Higgins
- Muse – 10 September 2004, with Neon and 23–24 January 2007, with Ground Components
- Faithless – 8–9 October 2004, with Way Out West
- The Black Eyed Peas – 16 October 2004 and 30 October 2007
- Jet – 21 October 2004, with Dallas Crane and The Pictures
- Maroon 5 – 21 November 2004
- Live – 30 November 2004
- PJ Harvey – 3 December 2004
- Good Charlotte – 12–13 February 2005, with The Bleeders and Day of Contempt and 11–12 October 2007, with Kisschasy and The Hot Lies
- Velvet Revolver – 23–24 February 2005, with The Screaming Jets
- Grinspoon – 6 May 2005, with Shihad, The Spazzys and Grand Fatal
- The Used – 12 May 2005, with After the Fall and Irrelevant and 28 April 2023, co-headlined by Papa Roach, with Coldrain
- Nine Inch Nails – 19–20 August 2005, with The Bird Blobs and The Follow, 16 September 2007, with The White Rose Movement and 24 February 2009, with Jaguar Love
- Method Man & Redman – 24 September 2005
- Simple Plan – 5–6 October 2005, with The All-American Rejects, 18 October 2008, with The Getaway Plan and Short Stack, 1 June 2012, with We the Kings and The Never Ever and 13 April 2024, with Boys Like Girls and We the Kings
- Oasis – 28–29 November 2005, with The Checks
- The White Stripes – 25 January 2006, with The Greenhornes and The Situations
- Kanye West – 26 March 2006
- James Blunt – 13–14 April 2006, with Clare Bowditch
- The Living End – 12 May 2006, with Kisschasey and Gyroscope
- The Story of the Year – 16 May 2006, with Flogging Molly and Emery
- Wolfmother – 20–21 July 2006, with The Tucker B's and Dungen
- Dashboard Confessional – 6 September 2006, with Antiskeptic
- Rogue Traders – 23 September 2006, with TV Rock
- Panic! at the Disco – 5 October 2006
- The Gigantour – 22 October 2006
- Bernard Fanning – 31 October 2006, with Augie March
- AFI – 18 November 2006, with The Bleeders
- The Mars Volta – 28 November 2006, 15 March 2007, 19 June 2008 and 20 January 2010
- The G3 Concert – 1 December 2006 and 30 March 2012
- The New Year's Day Jam – 1 January 2007
- Tenacious D – 16 January 2007, with Tex Perkins and Tim Rogers
- The Killers – 26 January 2007, with Starky
- My Chemical Romance – 27 January 2007, with Another Day Down and 27 January 2012, with Closure in Moscow
- Snow Patrol – 19 February 2007, with The Howling Bells and The Red Riders, 17 November 2008 and 30 March 2009, with Jenny Lewis
- The Mardi Gras Music Festival – 3 March 2007, 7 March 2009 and 7 March 2015
- Fall Out Boy – 8 March 2007, with Trial Kennedy and Avalon Drive
- Rock Star Supernova – 16 March 2007, with Toby Rand
- The Pet Shop Boys – 6 April 2007
- The Fresh Party Music Festival – 14 April 2007
- 30 Seconds to Mars – 4 May 2007, with Angelas Dish and 30 July 2010, with The Art
- The Dave Matthews Band – 5 May 2007, with Xavier Rudd
- The We Love Sounds Music Festival – 10 June 2007, 8 June 2008, 6 June 2009 and 12 June 2010
- The Arctic Monkeys – 3 and 8 August 2007, with Operator Please, 22 January 2009 and 12 January 2012, with Miles Kane and Violent Soho
- The Bloc Party – 4 August 2007, with The Midnight Juggernauts, 25–26 November 2008, with Van She, 13 March 2013, with The World's End Press and 18 November 2023, with Interpol
- The Kaiser Chiefs – 5 August 2007, with Operator Please and Wolf & Cub
- The Breakout Music Festival – 15 September 2007 and 2 December 2011
- The Afterlife Music Festival – 30 September – 1 October 2007
- Marilyn Manson – 6 October 2007, with The Spazzys and 14 October 2009
- The Imagine Music Festival – 19 October 2007
- Bad Religion – 7 November 2007, with Strung Out and The Mid Youth Crisis and 30 September 2009, with NOFX and Pour Habit
- Robyn – 17 November 2007, with The Sneaky Sound System and Van She
- The Ministry of Sound Rave – 1–2 December 2007
- The Veronicas – 7 December 2007, with Dean Geyer and Calerway
- The New Year's Jam – 31 December 2007 – 1 January 2008
- Kings of Leon – 3 and 9 January 2008, with The Youth Group
- Dream Theater – 29 January 2008 and 5 December 2009, with Pain of Salvation
- Interpol – 21 February 2008, with The Youth Group and 18 November 2023, with Bloc Party
- Olivia Newton-John – 1 March 2008, with Cyndi Lauper
- Keith Urban – 26 and 29 March 2008
- The Sydney Song Summit – 4 April 2008
- Tiësto – 3–4 May 2008
- Bullet for My Valentine – 7 May 2008, with Avenged Sevenfold, Atreyu and Behind Crimson Eyes and 10 September 2010, with Bring Me the Horizon and The Cancer Bats
- Armin van Buuren – 6 June 2008
- Sigur Rós – 2 August 2008, with PVT
- Operator Please – 8 August 2008, with Pnau
- The Freedom Music Festival – 23 August 2008
- The Music as a Weapon Music Festival – 3 September 2008
- The Global Gathering Music Festival – 30 November 2008 and 4 October 2009
- MGMT – 9 December 2008, with Tame Impala and Luke Steele
- The Red Bull Soundclash Festival – 11 December 2008
- The NeverEverLand Music Festival – 13 December 2008
- The X-QLUSIVE Showtek Music Festival – 19 December 2008, 19 December 2009 and 19 May 2012
- Fedde le Grand – 27 December 2008
- The Kooks – 5 January 2009, 6 January 2012, with Toucan, 20 January 2015, with The Griswolds and Catfish and the Bottlemen and 20 February 2025, with Briston Maroney
- The Raggamuffin Reggae Music Festival – 3 February 2009
- N.E.R.D – 4 March 2009, with Phrase and Grandmaster Flash and 7 January 2011, with Tinie Tempah, The Boys Noize and Chromeo
- The Fray – 24 March 2009, with Secondhand Serenade and Shelley Harland
- Rise Against – 28 March 2009, with The (International) Noise Conspiracy, 50 Lions and A Death in the Family
- The Trance Energy Music Festival – 9 April 2009
- Jason Mraz – 15 April 2009, with Eric Hutchinson and Lisa Mitchell
- The Presets – 30 May – 1 June 2009, with Van She and Architecture in Helsinki
- Lily Allen – 9–10 June 2009, with The Cassette Kids, 21 January 2010, with Miami Horror and 25 July 2014, with Allday
- The Flaming Lips – 28 July 2009, with The Midnight Juggernauts
- Eskimo Joe – 30 July 2009, with Bob Evans
- The Twice in a Blue Moon Music Festival – 12 September 2009
- The Hilltop Hoods – 23 October 2009, 4 August 2012, with Horrorshow and Briggs and 24 October 2014, with The Thundamentals and K21
- The Yeah Yeah Yeahs – 8 January 2010, with The Circle Pit
- The Wolfe Tones – 16 January 2010
- Groove Armada – 25 January 2010, with The Simian Mobile Disco
- Them Crooked Vultures – 26–27 January 2010, with The Art
- Phoenix – 2 March 2010, with Miami Horror and 5 March 2014, with The World's End Press
- The Pixies – 14–16 March 2010, with Theart
- James Reyne – 17 March 2010
- Tata Young – 2 April 2010
- The Creamfields Music Festival – 1 May 2010 and 30 April 2011
- The Vampire Weekend – 13 May 2010, with Cloud Control and 8 January 2014, with Gang of Youths
- Catherine Britt – 25 June 2010
- Kasabian – 24 July 2010, with Little Red, 24 January 2012, with The Vaccines and 10 August 2014, with The Delta Riggs
- LCD Soundsystem – 26 July 2010, with Hot Chip and The Canyons
- The Temper Trap – 27 July 2010, with The Joy Formidable and Oh Mercy
- Florence + The Machine – 8 August 2010, with The Drums
- A Tribe Called Quest – 11 August 2010, with Maseo
- The Utopia Homegrown Music Festival – 14 August 2010
- Slash featuring Myles Kennedy & The Conspirators – 16 August 2010, with Juke Kartel
- The Cat Empire – 29 August 2010, with Clairy Browne & The Bangin' Rackettes and Mama Kin and 18 October 2014, with Madre Monte
- Parkway Drive – 24 September 2010, with The Devil Wears Prada, The Ghost Inside and 50 Lions, 20 May 2011, with Bleeding Through, The Wonder Years, Confesions, Missy May I and The Turning Tide, 15 December 2012, with I Killed the Prom Queen and Northlane and 26 October 2018, with Killswitch Engage and Thy Art Is Murder
- Birds of Tokyo – 30 September 2010, with The Silversun Pickups and The Chemist
- The Godskitchen Trance Music Festival – 3 October 2010 and 2 October 2011
- Pendulum – 5 November 2010 and 13 October 2023, both with ShockOne
- Jason Derulo – 9–10 November 2010
- Oh Mercy – 17 November 2010
- Big Boi – 18 November 2010, with Miracle
- The No Sleep 'Til Sydney Music Festival – 18 December 2010
- Jimmy Buffett & The Coral Reefer Band – 26 January 2011
- Kesha – 10 March 2011
- The Stone Temple Pilots – 20 March 2011, with Grinspoon and the Redcoats
- The Script – 8–9 April 2011, with Tinie Tempah
- Bliss n Eso – 27–28 May 2011, with Big B and Horrorshow
- Pulp – 27 July 2011, with Belles Will Ring
- The Midnight Juggernauts – 30 July 2011, with Ghoul and DJ Shadow
- Above & Beyond – 10 September 2011, with Mat Zo and Jaytech, 27 January 2013, with Norin & Rad and Andrew Bayer and 31 December 2014
- The Wombats – 14 October 2011, with Faker and Owl Eyes
- Tinie Tempah – 6 March 2012, with Chase & Status and Zane Lowe
- Jessie J – 8 March 2012, with Professor Green, Amy Meredith and Ruby Rose
- Elbow – 26 March 2012, with The Bombay Bicycle Club
- Crosby, Stills & Nash – 4 April 2012
- Earth, Wind & Fire – 5 April 2012
- The Pogues – 11 April 2012
- One Direction – 13 April 2012, with Justice Crew and Johnny Ruffo
- Nicki Minaj – 16 May 2012, with Timomatic
- Guy Sebastian – 2 June 2012 and 19–20 April 2013
- The Jezabels – 9 June 2012, with Snakadaktal and LIGHTS
- The Shins – 25 July 2012, with Husky
- Jack White – 26 July 2012, with Lanie Lane
- The Nickelodeon SlimeFest – 15 September 2012
- Paul Oakenfold – 30 September 2012
- Dwight Yoakam – 16 November 2012, with Lee Kernaghan
- Reece Mastin – 8 December 2012, with The Justice Crew and The Janoskians
- Alexisonfire – 11 December 2012, with House vs. Hurricane
- Two Door Cinema Club – 3 January 2013, with The Vaccines and The Jungle Giants
- The X Factor Live! – 18 January 2013
- Ringo Starr & His All-Starr Band – 13–14 February 2013
- The Stone Roses – 6 March 2013
- The Beasts of Bourbon – 2 April 2013, with The Stooges
- The xx – 6–7 April 2013, with Jagwar Ma
- The Optus RockCorps Music Festival – 11 April 2013
- Flume – 29–30 April 2013, with Chet Faker
- Tame Impala – 2 May 2013, with The Midnight Juggarnauts
- A$AP Rocky – 28 June 2013, with A$AP Ferg
- The Manic Street Preachers – 5 July 2013, with Hungry Kids of Hungary
- The Devil Wears Prada – 13 July 2013, with A Day to Remember and Dream On, Dreamer
- alt-J – 31 July 2013, with Snakadaktal and 26 April 2023, with Royel Otis
- The Cult – 4 October 2013, with The Redcoats and The Beaches
- Bring Me the Horizon – 6 October 2013, with Of Mice & Men and Crossfaith
- Matt Corby – 11 October 2013, with The Bear's Den
- Steel Panther – 7 December 2013, with Buckcherry and Fozzy
- The Justice Crew – 22 April 2014
- Disclosure – 24 April 2014, with Touch Sensitive, Lancelot and Wave Racer
- Ellie Goulding – 3 June 2014, with Broods
- Bastille – 14 June 2014, with Foxes and Alison Wonderland
- Lorde – 11–12 July 2014, with SAFIA
- London Grammar – 24 July 2014 and 12 March 2015, with WET and Until the Ribbon Breaks
- Childish Gambino – 27 July 2014
- The Amity Affliction – 4 September 2014, with The Architects, Deez Nuts, Issues and Stray from the Path, 21 October 2023, with Silverstein, Earth Caller and Winnerz Circle, and 9 November 2024, with Ice Nine Kills, We Came as Romans and Heavensgate
- The Knife Party – 13 December 2014
- The 1975 – 16–17 January 2015, with Circa Waves
- The Vamps – 23 January 2015, with Short Stack and Masketta Fall
- Third Day – 11 February 2015, with NEEDTOBREATHE and Levi McGrath
- Chet Faker – 13 February and 3 March 2015, with Roland Tings and GL
- Slash featuring Myles Kennedy & The Conspirators – 24 February 2015, with Steel Panther and 24 February 2024, with The Struts and Rose Tattoo
- Demi Lovato – 18 April 2015, with Masketta Fall
- Megadeth – 18 October 2015, with Children of Bodom
- Culture Club – 11 June 2016, with Kids In The Kitchen and Björn Again
- Troye Sivan – 3 August 2016, with Nicole Millar and Tyde Levi, 20–21 September 2019, with Thelma Plum and Tyde Levi
- Porter Robinson & Madeon – 25 February 2017, with Lido and Elk Road and 10 November 2023, with jamesjamesjames (Porter Robinson only)
- Migos – 13–14 October 2017
- Halsey – 22 & 24 April 2018
- Billie Eilish - 30 April 2019, with Finneas
- Tash Sultana – 28 November 2020, with Clewse
- AJR - 23 August 2022
- Albatross – 23 September 2022
- Conan Gray – 18 November 2022

Sam Fender - 26 November 2022

- Lil Nas X – 4 January 2023
- Kehlani – 25 January 2023, with Noodles and Destin
- Boris Brejcha – 28 January 2023, with Ann Clue, Deniz Bul and Moritz Hofbauer
- Phoebe Bridgers – 6 February 2023
- Nepathya – 10 February 2023
- Bad Religion and Social Distortion – 18 February 2023
- Architects – 19 February 2023, with Counterparts and Thornhill
- Dean Lewis – 10 March 2023
- Kip Moore – 16 March 2023, with Randy Houser
- Denzel Curry – 27 April 2023, with Vv Pete and ZPLUTO and 22 February 2025, with 3%
- Daydream Festival 2023 – 29 April 2023; Modest Mouse, Tropical Fuck Storm, Beach Fossils, Cloud Nothings, Majak Door and Doors
- Babymetal – 9 June 2023, with Reliqa
- Hot Dub Time Machine – 8 July 2023, 15 June 2024 and 24 May 2025
- Little Simz – 21 July 2023, with Ziggy Ramo
- Yeah Yeah Yeahs – 24 July 2023, with Automatic
- J Balvin – 25 July 2023
- Beartooth and Pierce the Veil – 27 July 2023, with Dayseeker
- aMEI ASMR World Tour – 30 July 2023
- Golden Features – 18 August 2023
- Polaris – 16 September 2023, with August Burns Red, Kublai Khan and Currents
- Niki – 21 September 2023
- P1Harmony – 22 September 2023
- Rex Orange County – 23 September 2023, with grentperez
- DreamFest 2.0 – 30 September 2023
- Giveon – 1 October 2023
- A-Lin – 4 October 2023
- Ocean Alley – 7 October 2023, with Winston Surfshirt and Le Shiv
- Radwimps – 9 October 2023
- Prateek Kuhad – 12 October 2023
- Oliver Tree – 14 October 2023
- Masego – 15 October 2023
- Lil Tjay – 17-18 October 2023, with Lithe
- Super Junior-D&E – 22 October 2023
- All Time Low – 8 November 2023, with Mayday Parade and Lauren Hibberd
- Måneskin – 22 November 2023
- Illenium – 25 November 2023
- Limp Bizkit – 29 November 2023, with Hanabie.
- Electric Callboy – 30 November 2023
- The Teskey Brothers – 1 December 2023
- Royal Blood – 13 December 2023, with Psychedelic Porn Crumpets and The Buoys
- Genesis Owusu – 15 December 2023, with EarthGang
- Gracie Abrams – 18 January 2024
- NOFX – 20-21 January 2024, with Bodyjar and Charlotte & the Harlots (20th); with Frenzal Rhomb and I Heard They Suck at Conversation!! (21st)
- Noah Kahan – 23-24 January 2024
- The Darkness – 10 February 2024, with You Am I, DZ Deathrays, Cry Club, DJ Eleven and DJ Denim
- Mudvayne and Coal Chamber – 16 February 2024
- Sampha – 26 February 2024
- Mardi Gras Party 2024 – 2 March 2024
- The Streets – 8 March 2024
- Mr. Bungle – 9 March 2024, with Melvins
- Maisie Peters – 21 March 2024 with Gretta Ray and Dylan
- Lainey Wilson – 22 and 24 March 2024
- Silvestre Dangond – 23 March 2024
- Touch Bass Festival – 31 March 2024
- Live – 11 April 2024, with Incubus
- A Boogie wit da Hoodie – 16-17 April 2024
- Chase & Status and Luude – 20 April 2024
- 6lack – 26 April 2024
- Nothing but Thieves – 30 April 2024
- Kim Jae Joong – 10 May 2024
- Macklemore – 11-13 May 2024
- Jungle – 22 May 2024
- Hockey Dad – 6 July 2024
- Teddy Swims – 11 July 2024
- Girl in Red – 14 July 2024, with Telenova
- Lizzy McAlpine – 16 July 2024
- TV Girl – 19 July 2024, with Surfing
- Baby Gravy (Yung Gravy and Bbno$) – 21 July 2024
- The Last Dinner Party – 23 July 2024, with Tia Gostelow
- Tones and I – 23 August 2024, with Coterie
- Greta Van Fleet – 24 August 2024, with The Velveteers
- Madison Beer – 30 August 2024
- DnB Allstars – 20 September 2024
- Anastasia – 28 September 2024
- Busta Rhymes – 8 October 2024, with YG Marley
- Ben Böhmer – 11 October 2024
- Big Time Rush – 12 October 2024
- UB40 – 16 October 2024, with Eagle-Eye Cherry
- Steel Panther – 23 October 2024
- Empire of the Sun – 24 October 2024
- Fletcher – 27 October 2024
- LANY – 6 November 2024
- Monolith Festival 2024 (Coheed and Cambria, Periphery, Leprous, Intervals and Novelists) – 10 November 2024
- Tate McRae – 12-13 November 2024
- Tems – 15 November 2024
- Mother Mother – 23 November 2024
- TISM – 29 November 2024, with Eskimo Joe, Machine Gun Fellatio, Ben Lee and The Mavis's
- Amelie Lens – 30 November 2024, with Farrago, Bella Claxton, Justin Muscat and LeStrange
- DPR – 6 December 2024
- Wallows – 12 December 2024
- Royel Otis – 21 December 2024
- We Are One Festival – 27 December 2024
- Black Coffee – 3 January 2025
- No One But Us Festival 2025 – 4 January 2025
- Marlon Hoffstadt – 10 January 2025
- Finneas – 11 January 2025, with Fazerdaze
- City and Colour – 16 January 2025, with Nathaniel Rateliff & the Night Sweats
- Kaytranada – 17-18 January 2025, with Channel Tres, Kitty Ca$h & Lou Phelps
- Benson Boone – 19-20 January 2025
- Idles – 22 January 2025
- The Driver Era – 24 January 2025
- Amyl and the Sniffers – 25 January 2025, with Bob Vylan and Miss Kaninna
- Bad Omens – 28-29 January 2025, with Poppy and House of Protection
- The Flaming Lips – 2 February 2025
- Porter Robinson – 7 February 2025
- AURORA – 8 February 2025
- Sajjan Raj Vaidya – 10 February 2025
- Tyler Childers – 11-12 February 2025
- Rudimental – 19 February 2025, with Nina Las Vegas
- Goo Goo Dolls – 21 February 2025, with Thirsty Merc
- Jinjer – 23 February 2025, with Kittie
- Mardi Gras Party 2025 – 1 March 2025
- Khruangbin – 5 March 2025, with Hermanos Gutiérrez
- L.A.B. – 8 March 2025, with Stan Walker and Corrella
- Niki – 9 March 2025
- Alexisonfire – 11 March 2025, with Underoath and Gel
- Fat Freddy's Drop – 15 March 2025
- Jon Pardi – 20 March 2025, with Larry Fleet and Zach Top
- Six60 – 22 March 2025
- Nelly – 25 March 2025, with St. Lunatics, Chingy and Jermaine Dupri
- Nepathya – 29 March 2025
- Electric Warehouse – 4 April 2025
- Day6 – 6-7 April 2025
- Sex Pistols featuring Frank Carter – 8 April 2025
- Yellowcard – 9 April 2025, with Motion City Soundtrack and Plain White T's
- John Summit – 11-12 April 2025
- Touch Bass Festival – 20 April 2025
- Warehouse Project – 24 April 2025
- Yuvan Shankar Raja – 1 May 2025
- The Wiggles - 3-4 May 2025
- Myles Smith – 9 May 2025, with Jack Botts
- Chris Lake – 10 May 2025, with Noizu and Little Fritter
- The Red Clay Strays – 20 May 2025, with Sweet Talk
- Verknipt Festival – 23 May 2025
- Nmixx – 8 June 2025
- Spacey Jane – 13-15 June 2025, with Phoebe Go & The Moving Stills
- Randy Houser – 22 June 2025, with Jerrod Niemann
- STAYC – 3 July 2025
- Baekhyun – 3 August 2025
- Daesung - 17 August 2025
- P1Harmony - 23 August 2025
- Camila Cabello - 30 August 2025

== See also ==
- Architecture of Sydney
