= Falling into Place =

Falling into Place may refer to:

- Falling into Place (Candy Butchers album), 1999
- Falling into Place (David Dallas album), 2013
- Falling into Place (Rebelution album), 2016
- Falling into Place, a 2001 EP by Finch
- "Falling into Place", a 2004 episode of Six Feet Under

== See also ==
- Fall into Place, 2009 album by The Sundance Kids
