= Valet Records =

Australian independent record label

- Founded: 2005; 20 years ago
- Founder: Matt Wardle
- Defunct: 2007; 18 years ago
- Distributor(s): MGM
- Genre: Various
- Country of origin: Australia
- Location: O'Connor, Western Australia
- Official website: valetrecords.com

Valet Records was an Australian independent record label established in O'Connor, Western Australia, by Matt Wardle in 2005. The label manager, Jaun-Paul Rebola, was the vocalist and guitarist for the band, Calerway. In August 2005 the label issued an extended play and its associated DVD for Brisbane-based group, Avalon Drive.

== Artists ==
- Avalon Drive: Avalon Drive (EP, 2005) The City of Burnt Out Lights (EP, 2006), "Get Up" (2006)
- Calerway: A Letter of Creedence (EP, 1 May 2006) "Loaded" (2005), "Always Always" (2005)
- Fifty Six: Gunpowder Office (EP, 6 November 2006) (Mmvr002) "Let It Ride" (2006)

== See also ==
- List of record labels
