= Wątroba =

Wątroba is a Polish surname. Notable people with the surname include:

- Franciszek Wątroba (1893–1920), Polish World War I artillerist
- James Watroba, past drummer for Australian band Calerway
- Jan Wątroba (born 1953), Roman Catholic bishop of Rzeszów, Poland
- Margaret Watroba, Australian climber

== See also ==
- Pan Votruba, character from Soviet TV show Pub "13 Chairs"
