= Back to Oblivion =

Studio album by Finch
- Released: September 30, 2014
- Genre: Alternative rock
- Length: 46:42
- Label: Razor & Tie
- Producer: Brian Virtue

Finch chronology
Finch (2008)	Back to Oblivion (2014)

Singles from Back to Oblivion
- 1. "Two Guns to the Temple" Released: August 18, 2014; 2. "Anywhere But Here" Released: September 2, 2014

Back to Oblivion is the third studio album by American rock band Finch, released on September 30, 2014. It is the band's first full-length effort since Say Hello to Sunshine in 2005. After breaking up in 2006, reuniting in 2008, and breaking up again in 2010, Finch regrouped in 2012 and signed with Razor & Tie in 2014. "Two Guns to the Temple" was the first song released for the album on August 11, 2014. Brian Virtue (Thirty Seconds to Mars, Deftones) was brought in to produce the record. This is their first full-length album to feature bassist Daniel Wonacott, who first joined Finch when they reunited in 2007. Additionally, it features their original drummer Alex Pappas who played on their 2002 debut, What It Is to Burn.

== Background ==
After ending its hiatus that lasted from 2006 to 2007, Finch released a self-titled EP in 2008 and announced it would begin work on a full-length follow up to its second studio album, Say Hello to Sunshine, shortly after. However, after two years of infrequent updates, Finch announced in December 2010 that the band had officially broken up and work on its third studio album had dissolved. From its break-up announcement, Finch explained their reasons for ending the band: "Over the past few years we have collectively gone insane trying to achieve the common goal of writing our new record. It's become obvious to all of us that the thing that made Finch such a special band to be in, was also the key ingredient that was tearing us apart. As we get older and broaden our musical pallets [sic], we are all on separate planets drifting further and further out of orbit." The only two songs from these recording sessions that were officially released — "Hail to the Fire" and "World of Violence" — were available on what was then said to be the band's final release, Epilogue in 2010.

In 2012, Finch's former band manager Andy Harris asked the band if they would be interested in reuniting and only doing two shows in celebration of the 10th-anniversary of the band's 2002 debut album, What It Is to Burn. Harris got the idea from his wife, who was the manager for New Found Glory and arranged some 10th-anniversary shows for their 2002 album, Sticks and Stones. The lineup for these shows featured long-time members Nate Barcalow, Randy Strohmeyer and Alex Linares, in addition to founding member Alex Pappas, who left before the recording of Say Hello to Sunshine, and Daniel Wonacott, who participated in Finch's previous reunion and performed on its self-titled EP. Interest in these anniversary shows grew rapidly, and what started out as only two shows evolved into a multi-leg international tour in support of What It Is to Burn throughout 2013. While on the anniversary tour, Finch started to write new songs, though at the time, it wasn't clear if the band would ever release these songs.

== Release and promotion ==
Back to Oblivion was released on September 30, 2014 through Razor & Tie in North America and on September 29 through Spinefarm Records in Europe. The album is Finch's first through these labels. Finch released a teaser video for Back to Oblivion featuring a song clip and visually showed a digitally distorted picture of the album's cover art, a promotional photo of the band and a close-up of a human eye. The first official song released from the album, "Two Guns to the Temple", was made available for online streaming on August 11 and released as a digital single in some markets shortly after. This was followed by the single "Anywhere but Here", which was made available for online streaming on September 1, and vocalist Nate Barcalow described as: "simply a song about escaping in a world that is on the verge of collapse."

On April 7, 2015, Finch released a video for "Play Dead", which was directed by bassist Daniel Wonacott.

== Reception ==
Professional ratings
Aggregate scores
Source	Rating
Metacritic	67/100
Review scores
Source	Rating
Bring the Noise	7.5/10 stars
Drowned in Sound	8/10 stars
Metal.de	7/10
Revolver	4/5 stars
Rock Sound	4/10
Soundsphere	4/5 stars
Ultimate Guitar	8/10

Back to Oblivion peaked at number 103 on the US Billboard 200, number 11 on the US Alternative Albums, number 6 on the US Hard Rock Albums, and number 28 on the US Top Rock Albums charts.

== Track listing ==
All lyrics are written by Nate Barcalow; all music is composed by Finch.

No.	Title	Length
1.	"Back to Oblivion"	3:23
2.	"Anywhere But Here"	3:09
3.	"Further from the Few"	3:31
4.	"Murder Me"	3:11
5.	"Picasso Trigger"	3:38
6.	"Play Dead"	5:21
7.	"Two Guns to the Temple"	2:53
8.	"The Great Divide"	3:07
9.	"Us vs. Them"	3:57
10.	"Tarot"	4:56
11.	"Inferium"	5:28
12.	"New Wave"	4:08

Japanese bonus tracks
No.	Title	Length
13.	"Keep the Kids Safe"
14.	"Back to Oblivion" (acoustic)
15.	"Picasso Trigger" (acoustic)
16.	"Faster Now" (full band demo)

== Personnel ==
Band

- Nate Barcalow – vocals
- Randy Strohmeyer – guitar
- Alex Linares – guitar
- Daniel Wonacott – bass guitar
- Alex Pappas – drums, percussion

Production

- Brian Virtue – production

== Charts ==
Chart (2014)	Peak position
UK Albums (OCC)	161
US Billboard 200	103
US Top Alternative Albums (Billboard)	11
US Top Rock Albums (Billboard)	28
