= Phoebe Go =

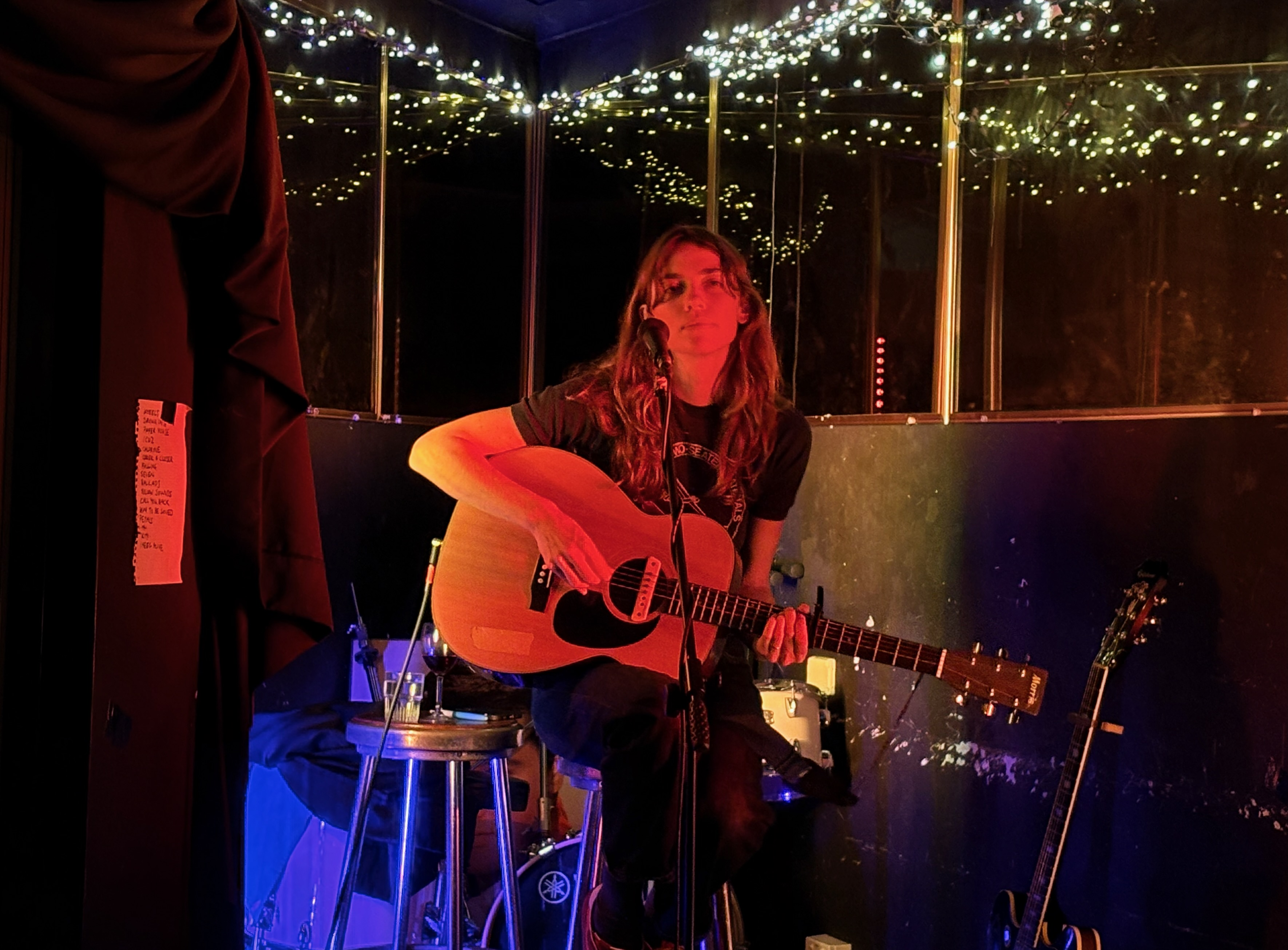
- Phoebe Go performing in Thirroul in May 2026

Background information
- Born: Phoebe Cockburn; 9 October 1994 (age 31); Melbourne, Victoria, Australia
- Genres: Indie folk; alt-pop
- Instruments: Vocals, guitar, piano
- Years active: 2010–present
- Label: AWAL
- Formerly of: Snakadaktal; Two People
- Website: imphoebego.com

Phoebe Go (born 9 October 1994) is an Australian singer and songwriter from Melbourne. She was a founding member of indie pop band Snakadaktal from 2010, where she sang and played synthesiser, before forming dream pop group Two People with former bandmate Joey Clough. In 2022, she began releasing music as Phoebe Go, and issued her first solo EP, Player. Her first album, Marmalade, was released in 2024.

== Early life and career ==
Phoebe grew up in Melbourne and started songwriting at 11 years old, finding inspiration from her father's favourite artists, Johnny Cash and Lou Reed, which made a "huge impact on [her] sense of self and the idea of expression and the freedom in it."

Phoebe began playing in the indie pop band Snakadaktal at 15 years old, while she was in high school. The band's debut extended play (EP), released in 2011, reached number 26 on the ARIA Charts. Snakadaktal disbanded in 2014.

In 2016, Lou and former bandmate Joey Clough formed the duo Two People, and released two studio albums, First Body in 2019, followed by Second Body in 2020.

Phoebe released her first solo single, "We Don't Talk", in May 2022. She issued her debut five-track EP, Player, that October, which features delicate harmonies and a more stripped-back sound which compliments more introspective lyrics.

In May 2024, Phoebe Go released her first solo album, Marmalade, via AWAL. Writing for The AU Review, Pace Proctor described the eight-track record as a "shimmering, alt-pop genre fusion built on shuffling drums, simple yet effective guitar riffs, and cruising vocals."

== Discography ==
=== With Snakadaktal ===
Studio albums

- Sleep in the Water (2 August 2013, Liberation)

EPs

- Snakadaktal (25 November 2011, I Oh You)
- The Sun II (3 January 2014, Liberation)

=== With Two People ===
Studio albums

- First Body (18 January 2019, Liberation)
- Second Body (28 August 2020, Liberation)

=== As Phoebe Go ===
Studio albums

- Marmalade (17 May 2024, AWAL)

EPs

- Player (28 October 2022, no label)
