= Finch (American band) =

American rock band

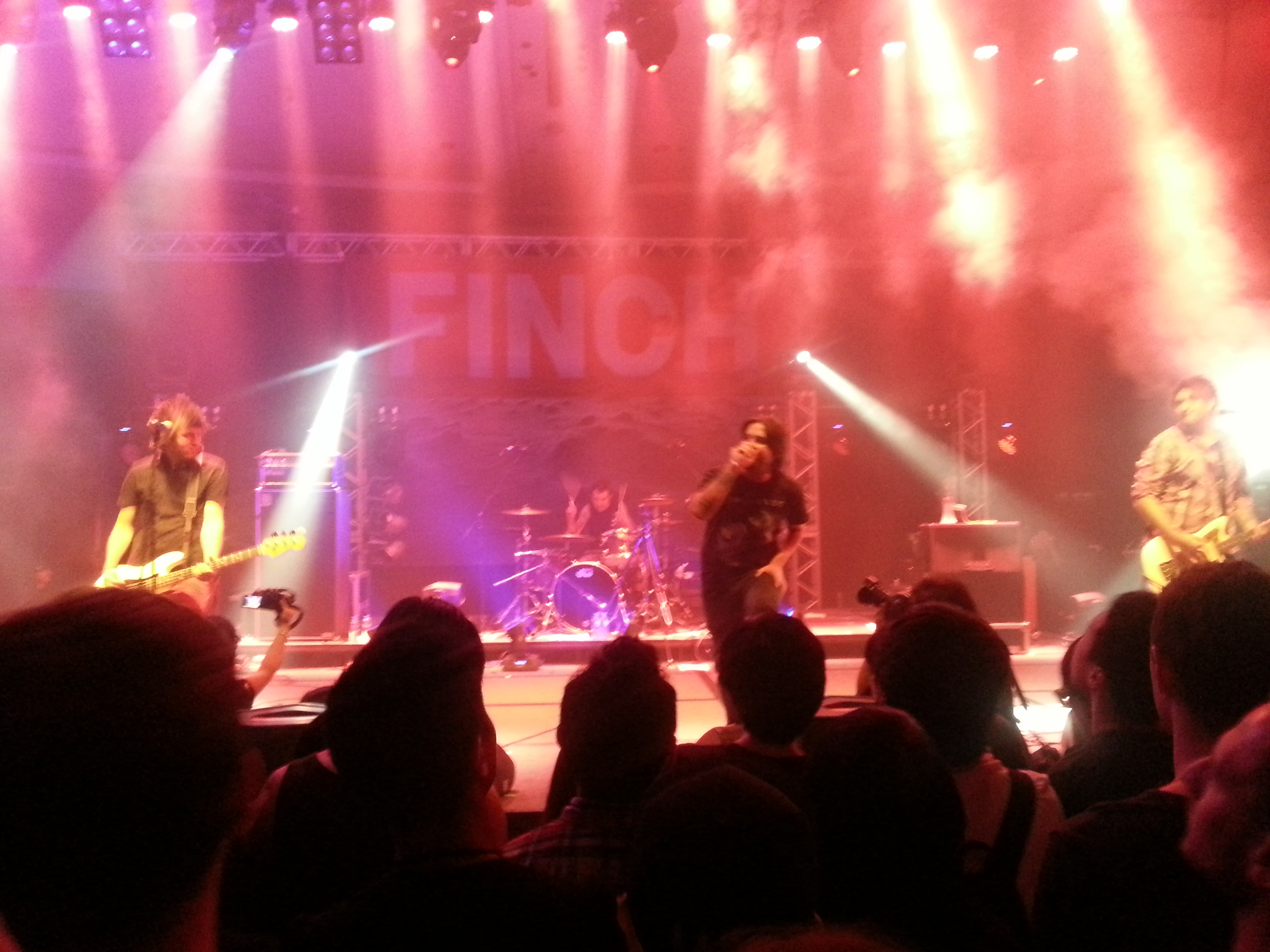
- Finch performing in 2014

Background information
- Origin: Temecula, California, U.S.
- Genres: Post-hardcore; emo; alternative rock; screamo; pop screamo
- Years active: 1999–2006; 2007–2010; 2012–2016; 2022–present
- Labels: Drive-Thru; MCA; Geffen; Finch Music Inc.; Razor & Tie
- Members: Nate Barcalow; Alex Linares; Alex Pappas; Randy Strohmeyer; Kenny Finn
- Past members: Daniel Wonacott; Derek Doherty; Marc Allen; Andrew Marcogliese

Finch is an American rock band from Temecula, California. The band is best known for their single "What It Is to Burn" from the album of the same name (2002). Their second album, Say Hello to Sunshine (2005), peaked within the top 30 on the Billboard 200. Following setbacks within the group, they released the album Back to Oblivion (2014).

== History ==
=== Early history (1999–2001) ===
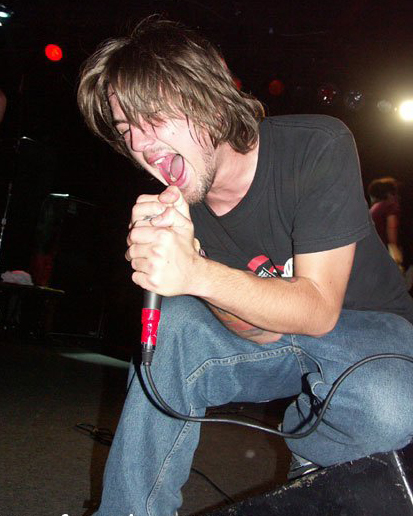
Vocalist Nate Barcalow

Finch originally formed under the name Numb with Nate Barcalow on vocals, Alex Linares on guitar, Derek Doherty on bass and Alex Pappas on drums. The members, who had met each other through mutual friends, had all been in a prior band, the HIVs, which had broken up after writing two songs. This original formation was described by Nate Barcalow as a “Deftones ripoff band".

Guitarist Randy Strohmeyer was invited to join the group after they witnessed him play with his band Evitca Fresh; shortly thereafter the band changed their name to from Numb to Finch. Strohmeyer became friends with Drive-Thru Records owner, Richard Reines, following fan letters he had sent in a few years prior. Reines offered the group a chance to perform at a showcase show; the band performed at the "Drive Thru Records Night" on November 26th at Chain Reaction, Anaheim, California, reportedly for an audience of 700 people. A month after the show, the group released a demo compilation disc through their website.

The band began working on their debut album in February 2001 and released their first EP Falling into Place on October 9th 2001.

=== What It Is to Burn (2002–2003) ===
Pre-production for their debut album, What It Is to Burn, took place at DML Studios in Escondido, California in February and April 2001. They began recording the album in June at Big Fish Studios in Encinitas, California with producer Mark Trombino. After tracking guitars in July, recording subsequently continued through September. Strohmeyer said it collectively took a year to write all of the material on the album.

What It Is to Burn was released on March 12 as a joint release between MCA and Drive-Thru Records, followed by a release in the UK on June 2. It was preceded by a promotional music video for "Letters to You" in January 2002, though the song was not released as a commercial single at the time. The album was predominantly described as emo and pop punk. Daryl Palumbo of Glassjaw performs guest vocals on two tracks on the album: "Grey Matter" and "Project Mayhem".

To promote the record, the group toured throughout 2002 and 2003. They began shortly after the album's release by touring with Moth. They followed this up with an extensive tour schedule across the United States, the UK, and Japan. They toured with bands including Brand New, The Starting Line, New Found Glory, Something Corporate, From Autumn to Ashes, Coheed and Cambria, and Further Seems Forever, among others.

Nearly a year following the initial release of the What It Is to Burn album, the group released the song of the same name as the first official single from the record in January 2003. The single became the band's biggest charting success, peaking at number 15 on the US Billboard Alternative Airplay chart in May 2003 and spending 16 weeks on the chart. The song was followed up with an official single release of the track "Letters to You" in April 2003.

In May 2003, the band performed as a special guest at two shows of MTV's Campus Invasion tour. In June, the band appeared on Jimmy Kimmel Live!. In July, the group appeared on Last Call with Carson Daly. In August, the group performed at Furnace Fest and at the Reading and Leeds Festivals.

=== Say Hello to Sunshine and Finch EP (2003–2010) ===
While on tour, the band began working on writing new songs for their second album; several of these songs were debuted during live performances throughout 2003 and 2004. In November, they began working on demos with Mark Trombino. While in the process of writing these demos, Pappas left the band and went to join the duo JamisonParker as a touring drummer. Most of the songs that they recorded were written with Marc Allen, who at the time of recording, was the drummer of the band Counterfit. Other songs were recorded with Chris Tsagakis of RX Bandits, but none of those songs ended up being used on the second record. During the recording of the album, the band was moved between three different record labels: Drive-Thru Records and MCA Records, which was then purchased by Geffen Records. As a touring musician, Marc Allen played his first show with the band in January 2004. The band announced a tour on June 1st with Counterfit and Recover, which began in July and lasted until September. By the end of this tour, Counterfit disbanded and Mark Allen became Finch's full time drummer.

The band finished recording their sophomore album in January 2005. In May 2005, they released its lead single, "Bitemarks and Bloodstains", which they had debuted two years prior during the What Is It to Burn tour. The group's second album, Say Hello to Sunshine was released on June 7th, 2005. On the day of its release, they played an acoustic show at Tower Records, in Los Angeles, California. To promote the release, the band embarked on a European and North American tour from April through September. After this tour, the band toured as a supporting act for H.I.M, beginning on October 7th through November 24th. At the end of November, the band announced a hiatus, stating: "Amongst the many reasons for our decision, our individual priorities just lie in different places".

In October 2007, the group announced they would be reforming and planning a comeback tour. The band reformed with two new members, Andrew Marcogliese who replaced Marc Allen and Daniel Wonacott who replaced Derek Doherty, both of whom were bandmates of Barcalow's band Cosmonaut, which he started during the band's hiatus. Finch's comeback tour began on January 13th, 2008. On July 22, 2008, the band released a four-song EP titled Finch. The EP was the band's first record that was released independently. Finch spent most of 2008 touring in support of this release, including a summer headlining tour with Scary Kids Scaring Kids, Foxy Shazam and Tickle Me Pink. Finch announced in October 2008 that they had begun work on their third studio album and on May 30th 2009, they released a demo for the song "Hail to the Fire" on their Myspace page.

On December 17, 2010, after an extended period of inactivity and infrequent updates, Finch announced that they had broken up. They explained that each member had broadened his "musical pallet [sic]," which made it difficult for the band to collaborate on new music. On the same day, Finch released a digital single titled Epilogue that featured "Hail to the Fire" and "World of Violence", which were to appear on their third album.

In 2012, Nate Barcalow formed a new band called Earthbound Ghost.

=== Back to Oblivion and Steel, Wood and Whiskey (2012–2016) ===
In October 2012, Finch announced they would reunite and perform the What It Is to Burn album in its entirety for one night on February 1, 2013, in California, in celebration of the 10th anniversary of the release of the album. Initially planned to be a single show, it was followed by announcement of a second California date after the first one sold out along with a UK date. The lineup for the reunion shows included Alex Pappas, who left Finch in 2004 before the release of Say Hello to Sunshine, and Daniel Wonacott, who joined the band during their previous reunion.

Finch continued to add individual What It Is to Burn anniversary dates until it became several North American tours, beginning with a March tour featuring The Almost and The World Is a Beautiful Place & I Am No Longer Afraid to Die and ending with an October tour with Dance Gavin Dance. Footage from the band's initial reunion show in California was recorded and released as a live CD/DVD titled What It Is to Burn X Live on January 7, 2014, through Tragic Hero Records. While touring, the band debuted the track "Back to Oblivion".

In March 2014, Finch announced they would join Warped Tour and release a new album through Razor & Tie later in the year. On September 30, Finch released their third studio album Back to Oblivion which was produced by Brian Virtue. Finch toured North America in the fall of 2014 with Maps & Atlases.

On November 13, 2015, Finch released the album Steel, Wood and Whiskey for free on their website. This acoustic album features newly recorded renditions of songs from their back catalog.

Finch began working on a fourth studio album in mid-2015. However, due to difficulties within the band, it was not completed. According to a statement by the rest of the band, Barcalow drew distant, missed recording sessions, and stopped communicating altogether by January 2016. In October 2016, Barcalow privately announced on Instagram that Finch had broken up and posted nine new demo songs to his personal YouTube account. The following day, the other members of Finch posted a statement claiming that Barcalow "quit again, for the third time in the bands [sic] history". This was followed by the release of two new demos to Finch's official YouTube account: "Monuments" and "These Buildings are Burning".

In early 2016, Linares, Pappas, Wonacott formed a new band with Buddy Nielsen of Senses Fail called Speak the Truth... Even If Your Voice Shakes. Barcalow went on to form the electronic duo outfit Private Lives. In 2022, Wonacott joined Senses Fail.

=== What It Is to Burn 20th anniversary tour (2022–present) ===
On October 11, 2022, the band announced that they would be reforming to play at the When We Were Young Festival in October 2023. In January 2023, they announced the What It Is to Burn 20th anniversary tour, which began in Chicago on May 5, 2023.

In April 2026, Pacific Ridge Records released A Tribute to Finch album featuring covers of Finch songs by various artists.

== Influences ==
Finch cite influences including New Found Glory, Faith No More, Staind, Limp Bizkit, Dinosaur Jr., Sonic Youth, No Age, Radiohead, Far, Hum, Failure, My Bloody Valentine, Abe Vigoda, the Flaming Lips, Animal Collective, Sigur Rós, Guided By Voices, Supergrass, Liquid Liquid, the Horrors, Oasis, the Smiths, the Cure, Guns n' Roses Alice in Chains, Nirvana, Stone Temple Pilots, Blink-182, Jimmy Eat World, the Movielife, Open Hand, Glassjaw, Deftones, Korn, Rx Bandits and Bjork.

== Band members ==
Current

- Nate Barcalow – lead vocals, keyboards (1999–2006, 2007–2010, 2012–2016, 2022–present)
- Randy "R2K" Strohmeyer – lead guitar, backing vocals (1999–2006, 2007–2010, 2012–2015, 2022–present)
- Alex "Grizz" Linares – rhythm guitar (1999–2006, 2007–2010, 2012–2016, 2022–present), lead guitar (2015-2016)
- Alex Pappas – drums, percussion (1999–2004, 2012–2016, 2022-present)
- Kenny Finn – bass (2023–present)

Former

- Derek Doherty – bass, backing vocals (1999–2006)
- Daniel Wonacott – bass, backing vocals (2007–2010, 2012–2016)
- Marc Allen – drums, percussion (2004–2006)
- Andrew Marcogliese – drums, percussion (2007–2010)

== Discography ==
- What It Is to Burn (2002)
- Say Hello to Sunshine (2005)
- Back to Oblivion (2014)
