= The Sundance Kids =

Australian band

Sundance
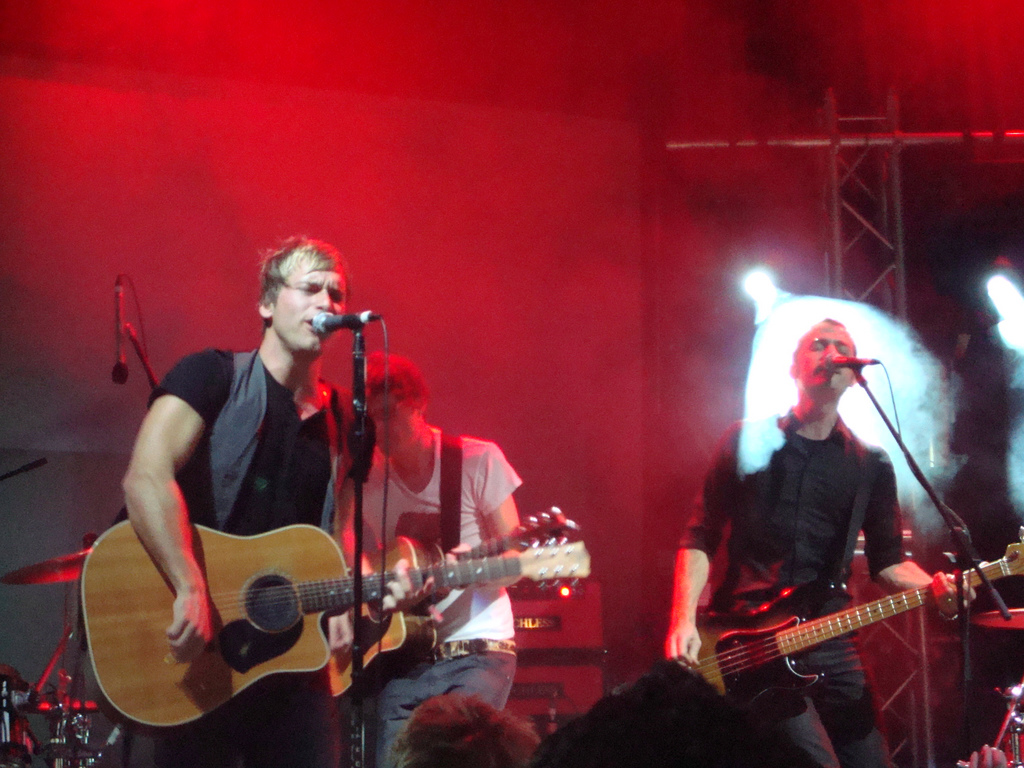
- The Sundance Kids at The Capitol in Perth, 2009

Background information
- Origin: Adelaide, Australia
- Genres: Pop rock, indie rock
- Years active: 2006–2012
- Label: Warner
- Members: Ash Gale; Jason Shepherd; Luke Zecchin; Suresh Meyer; Jeremy Wright
- Website: Thesundancekids.com

Sundance are an Australian pop rock/indie rock band from Adelaide, South Australia, formed in 2006. The group began as the acoustic trio of vocalist and guitarist Ash Gale as well as guitarists Jason Shepherd and Luke Zecchin, before they were joined by bassist and vocalist Jeremy Wright with drummer Suresh Meyer.

The band released an extended play (EP) in 2007, entitled Including the Atmosphere. In 2008, they toured with local acts such as Thirsty Merc and went into record their debut album. They signed to Warner Music in early 2009 and released their debut single "Solutions", which peaked at number 48 on the ARIA Singles Chart. It was followed up by the single "Drive Away" and tours supporting Evermore and The All-American Rejects. They released their debut studio album Fall into Place in September 2009, which peaked at number 50 on the ARIA Albums Chart. On December the 21st 2012 the band played their "farewell gig", indicating that the band is no longer together.

Lead singer Ash Gale has since released three solo EP's (Roll With The Gold. Brave The Sea, and Whatever The Ending), and his song 'Sing My Way' from was released on a Jeep Grand Cherokee television advertisement across Europe, Africa and the Middle East. Another of his songs, 'Sweet Release Devour' appeared on the US television show 'Shameless'

In 2018 after a 6-year break, the band reunited to play at 'Handpicked Festival' in November 2018 alongside Boy & Bear, Ball Park Music, BROODS, Vera Blue and Alex Lahey. The band has also been booked to open for Dashboard Confessional in Adelaide, South Australia as part of Dashboard Confessional's 2018 "Good Things Festival" at Jive in December 2018. In January 2019 The band supported 'The Veronicas' as part of the Australia Day celebrations.

== History ==
=== Formation and first release ===
The origins of the band emerged from the formation of an acoustic trio in Adelaide, South Australia in 2006, involving vocalist and guitarist Ash Gale, as well as guitarists Jason Shepherd and Luke Zecchin. The band soon became a full five-piece act, with bassist and vocalist Jeremy Wright and drummer Suresh Meyer joining. The formation came about in 2006, when the members all sat together in the car park of an Adelaide shopping centre eating takeaway pizza and discussing the future of the band. The band name, The Sundance Kids, came from the 1969 film Butch Cassidy and the Sundance Kid - which the members had never even seen until early 2009. Wright is a former member of the band ThinkTank (alongside the producer of Fall into Place, Darren Thompson). In the past he had toured with Idlewild and Rancid.

The band's debut release was the 2007 extended play Including the Atmosphere. They followed it up with support slots on numerous national tours with Thirsty Merc and Angelas Dish, as well as touring alongside Avalon Drive, where they would decide the headline act for each night by coin toss.

=== Debut album: Fall into Place ===
The Sundance Kids attracted some interest from major record labels before deciding to record their debut album on their own to ensure they had full creative control. The entire project was self-funded, with the band choosing to record with a record producer they knew, keep to a budget and back themselves to take the direction they wanted to go. It was recorded in Adelaide over a couple of months during late 2008 and early 2009, with the help of sound engineer Darren Thompson who works with a lot of interstate bands from around Australia. The band then sent the record to Los Angeles to be mixed by Brian Petrowsky.

"We definitely wanted something that when you put it in the stereo it sounded big and not missing something. We wanted to couple a big sound with some rawness and not overproduced plastic sounded thing and develop a life of its own sonically. So the aim was something big and polished but with some soulfulness as well. Brian (Petrowsky) took everything we had and gave us the sound we wanted."

— Luke Zecchin, lead guitar

The band were eventually signed to Warner Music, with their first single "Solutions", which originally appeared on their EP, being released in May 2009. It found mainstream radio airplay and consequently peaked at number 48 on the Australian ARIA Singles Chart. The album's second single, "Drive Away", was released in June 2009 and also attracted mainstream radio airplay. The music video for "Drive Away" was filmed in the band's hometown of Adelaide; notably around the city's CBD, the Adelaide Hills, Aldinga Beach and McLaren Vale. The band did this to show how thankful they were for the amount of home-town support they receive; "We wanted to make it obvious that it was filmed in there. It's important for us that people know we're proud to come from Adelaide. We get a lot of flak about it, but we take it on the chin." Following the release of the singles, they supported Evermore on their Australian tour and were the local act supporting on the sold-out tour by The All-American Rejects and Hoobastank.

The album was finally manufactured eight to twelve months following the completion of production, with the finished product being made ready to hit the shelves in September 2009. Fall into Place was released through Warner and Loud and Clear Records on 4 September 2009, debuting at number 50 on the Australian ARIA Albums Chart.

The Sundance Kids have said the album is based on what they were going through at the time of writing; it's about "reflecting on circumstances and the happenings of relationships with loved ones." Gale has named Jeff Buckley, Keane and Damien Rice as among his influences. Whilst touring with The All-American Rejects in 2009, their lead singer Tyson Ritter described the music as 'Jeff Buckley pop'; guitarist Zecchin mentioned, "He called it Buckley Pop. I don’t know if we’ll live up to it, but we can try."

The band doesn't intend on relocating in the near future, Gale saying "If we were going to move anywhere at all it would be overseas, but that would be a long way in the future." They are scheduled to do a headline tour to support the debut album in October 2009, with the possibility of doing some summer festivals at the end of the year.

== Personnel ==
- Ash Gale – vocals, guitar
- Jason Shepherd – bass
- Luke Zecchin – guitar
- Suresh Meyer – drums
- Jeremy Wright – bass, vocal

== Discography ==
=== Studio albums ===
List of albums, with selected chart positions
Title	Details	Peak chart positions
Title	Details	AUS
Fall into Place	Released: September 2009; Label: Warner Music Australia (5186-554875)	50

=== Extended plays ===
- Including the Atmosphere (2007)

=== Singles ===
List of singles, with selected chart positions
Title	Year	Peak chart positions	Album
Title	Year	AUS	Album
"Solutions"	2009	48	Fall into Place
"Drive Away"	2009	—	Fall into Place
"Burn So Bright"	2009	—	Fall into Place
"Where She Wants Me"	2012	—	Non-album single
