= What It Is to Burn (song) =

Single by Finch

from the album What It Is to Burn
- Released: January 2003
- Genre: Post-hardcore; emo; alternative rock; hard rock
- Length: 4:29
- Label: Drive-Thru
- Songwriter: Nate Barcalow
- Producer: Mark Trombino

Finch singles chronology
"What It Is to Burn" (2003)	"Letters to You" (2003)

"What It Is to Burn" is the first single and title track off the album What It Is to Burn by the American rock band Finch. It was released as a single in 2003 and was featured in the pilot episode of One Tree Hill. A demo version of the song was released on the Drive-Thru Records compilation CD Welcome to the Family in 2001.

== Background ==
In an interview with AOL, lead singer Nate Barcalow said he wrote this song from the viewpoint of a man in hell sending a letter to his loved one.

"What It Is to Burn" was first released in 2001 as a demo for a compilation by Drive-Thru Records entitled Welcome to the Family. This version is described as being longer and orchestral, as well as more popular within Finch's fanbase. The song was re-recorded and added as the title track for Finch's debut album in 2002. The shorter album version was released as a single in 2003, peaking at No. 15 on Billboard's Modern Rock Tracks chart; to this date, it is Finch's only charting song in the United States.

Loudwire listed "What It Is to Burn" at No. 47 in their list of the Top 21st Century Hard Rock Songs.

== Music video ==
The music video for "What It Is To Burn" was directed by Alexander Kosta, features the band performing in dimly lit rooms, intercut with shots of a woman in various states of distress or reflection.

== Chart history ==
Chart (2003)	Peak position
US Alternative Airplay (Billboard)	15
