= Finch (EP) =

EP by Finch
- Released: July 22, 2008
- Studios: Sage and Sound, Hollywood, California
- Genres: Post-hardcore, alternative rock, emo
- Length: 19:12
- Labels: Finch Music, Inc.
- Producer: Jason Cupp

Finch chronology
Say Hello to Sunshine (2005)	Finch (2008)	Back to Oblivion (2014)

Professional ratings
Review scores
Source	Rating
AbsolutePunk	82%

Finch is the self-titled second EP by American post-hardcore band Finch. It is the first release since the band's hiatus in 2006.

== Background and recording ==
Following a one-off date in November 2007, the band embarked on a West Coast reunion tour in January 2008. That same month, the band began recording new material. East Coast dates were added, extending the tour through to February 2008. In April 2008, the band performed at the Bamboozle Left festival, before playing the Give it a Name festival in the UK and the Groezrock festival in Belgium the following month. The band recorded an EP at Safe and Sound in Hollywood, California with them and Jason Cupp acting as producers. They were assisted by Alex Pablid; Cupp mixed the songs, which were then mastered by Fred Kavorkian at Avatar Studios in New York City.

The opening track to the EP, "Daylight", begins with a scream from Barcalow in the vein of "What It Is to Burn". "Famine or Disease" evokes the material on Say Hello to Sunshine. "From Hell" displays Barcalow's vocal abilities; its chorus sections echo Make Yourself-era (1999) Incubus. The EP ends with the seven minute long "Chinese Organ Thieves" incorporates elements from the band's past releases.

== Release ==
In July and August 2008, Finch toured across the US with Scary Kids Scaring Kids, Foxy Shazam, and Tickle Me Pink. On July 17, 2008, Finch was announced for release later that month. Two days later, "Daylight" and "From Hell" were posted on the group's Myspace profile. The EP was released digitally on July 22, 2008, and was due to be released in Hot Topic stores nationwide on July 29. However, due to manufacturing issues the physical release date was pushed back to August 1. The song "Famine or Disease" debuted at #3 on the Billboard's "Hot 100 Singles Sales" Chart, beating Madonna's "Give It 2 Me" and The Cure's "Freakshow" for that week who only charted #7 and #9 respectively. In November 2008, the band embarked on a tour of the UK. In February and March 2009, the band toured Australia as part of the Soundwave festival. In June 2009, Finch redesigned their official website and made the EP available for free download.

Drew Beringer of AbsolutePunk said the EP "showcases what Finch aimed to accomplish" on Say Hello to Sunshine, adding that the band evolved "and fine-tuned it into something divided fans can all agree on"

== Track listing ==
All songs written by Finch.

1. "Daylight" – 4:16
2. "Famine or Disease" – 3:57
3. "From Hell" – 3:39
4. "Chinese Organ Thieves" – 7:28

== Personnel ==
Personnel per booklet.

Finch

- Nate Barcalow – vocals
- Randy Strohmeyer – guitar
- Alex Linares – guitar
- Drew Marcogliese – drums
- Daniel Wonacott – bass guitar

Production and design

- Jason Cupp – producer, mixing
- Finch – producer
- Alex Pablid – assistant engineer
- Fred Kavorkian – mastering
- Finch – art concept
- Daniel Wonacott – design
