= Fall into Place =

Studio album by The Sundance Kids
- Released: 4 September 2009
- Recorded: 2008–2009, Adelaide
- Genres: Pop rock; acoustic rock
- Length: 47:50
- Labels: Warner; Loud and Clear
- Producer: Darren Thompson

The Sundance Kids chronology
Including the Atmosphere (2007)	Fall into Place (2009)

Fall into Place is the debut studio album by Australian rock band The Sundance Kids, released through Warner Music and Loud and Clear Records on 4 September 2009. The album debuted at number 50 on the Australian ARIA Albums Chart.

== Background, writing and production ==
The Sundance Kids attracted some interest from major record labels before deciding to record their debut album on their own to ensure they had full creative control. The entire project was self-funded, with the band choosing to record with a record producer they knew, keep to a budget and back themselves to take the direction they wanted to go.

"We did it very budget - we did it in Adelaide, and we did it with a producer we knew, which meant we could do it well and not spend a lot of unnecessary money. We were a bit smart about it."

— Ash Gale, vocals.

They have said the album is based on what they were going through at the time of writing; it's about "reflecting on circumstances and the happenings of relationships with loved ones." Gale named Jeff Buckley, Keane and Damien Rice as among his influences.

It was recorded in Adelaide over a couple of months during late 2008 and early 2009, with the help of sound engineer Darren Thompson. The band then sent the record to Los Angeles to be mixed by Brian Petrowsky.

== Release ==
The band's debut single was "Solutions", released in May 2009; a song which had originally appeared on their EP in 2007. The single was awarded with mainstream radio airplay and consequently peaked at number 48 on the Australian ARIA Singles Chart. "Drive Away" was selected to be the band's second single and was released in June 2009, with it also finding mainstream radio airplay.

Fall into Place was released months following the singles, through Warner Music and Loud and Clear Records on 4 September 2009. The album was manufactured eight to twelve months following the completion of production, with the finished product being made ready to hit the shelves in September 2009.

The band undertook a headline tour to support the album in October 2009.

== Track listing ==
1. "Burn So Bright" – 4:14
2. "Solutions" – 3:20
3. "Ready to Collide" – 3:24
4. "Drive Away" – 3:16
5. "Can You Read Me?" – 3:37
6. "Loud and Clear" – 1:15
7. "The Tide" – 5:25
8. "Still Time" – 3:56
9. "Safe and Sound" – 3:32
10. "Starting Today" – 3:23
11. "Small Moments" – 3:50
12. "With You I'm Home" – 4:08
13. "To Have You" – 4:37

Bonus tracks

1. "Solutions" (acoustic) – 3:15
2. "Stay with Me" (acoustic) – 6:15
3. "Taken by Storm" (acoustic) – 3:23
4. "All Things Stable" (acoustic) – 4:21
5. "The Tide" (acoustic) – 5:46

iTunes bonus tracks

1. "For the Hills" (acoustic) – 3:08
2. "Solutions" (music video) – 3:20

== Charts ==
Chart performance for Fall into Place
Chart (2009)	Peak position
Australian Albums (ARIA)	50
