= Sleep in the Water =

Studio album by Snakadaktal
- Released: 2 August 2013
- Recorded: Early 2013
- Studios: The Stables Studio, Melbourne
- Genre: Indie pop
- Length: 47:38
- Label: Liberation/I Oh You
- Producer: Dann Hume

Snakadaktal chronology
Snakadaktal (2011)	Sleep in the Water (2013)	The Sun II (2014)

Singles from Sleep in the Water
- 1. "Hung on Tight" Released: June 2013; 2. "Fall Underneath" Released: November 2013

Sleep in the Water is the debut album by the Australian five-piece indie pop, dream band, Snakadaktal. It was released on 2 August 2013 through Liberation Music with Dann Hume producing. It peaked at No. 9 on the ARIA Albums Chart. Two singles were provided, "Hung on Tight" (June 2013) and "Fall Underneath" (November). In February 2014 The Sun II was released as an extended play, which included some remixes and unreleased songs from recording sessions for this album. The band had promoted it with a national tour in August to September 2013. It was the band's only studio album before splitting up in March 2014.

== Recording and production ==
Sleep in the Water was produced by Dann Hume and recorded at his studio, The Stables Studios, in Melbourne during early 2013. All songs were written and performed by the band's members Joseph Clough on guitar and synthesisers, Phoebe Cockburn on vocals and synthesisers, Sean Heathcliff on vocals and guitar, Jarrah Mccarty-Smith on bass guitar, and Barna Nemeth on drums. They created a promotional web series on their YouTube account during its recording phase.

== Critical response ==
The album debuted and peaked at No. 9 on the ARIA Albums Chart, a leap from their self-titled EP issued in November 2011, which had entered at No. 78.

Sleep in the Water was received favourably, including high rotation at national youth radio station, Triple J. "Fall Underneath" was used on the Ministry of Sound's Chillout Sessions XVI. The band signed to Humming Records to have the album released in Germany, Austria and Switzerland in February 2014. It was also released on 12" vinyl, briefly available in a bundle that included their Treasures compilation and the self-titled EP, both on CD. For the promotion, the vinyl was coloured blue.

== Track listing ==
All tracks are written by Barna Nemeth, Sean Kelly (p.k.a. Sean Heathcliff), Phoebe Louise Cockburn, Joseph Vaughan Clough, Jarrah Finn McCarty-Smith;

No.	Title	Length
1.	"Fall Underneath"	4:15
2.	"Hung on Tight"	4:14
3.	"Deep"	4:39
4.	"Isolate"	3:21
5.	"Ghost"	4:06
6.	"Feel the Ocean Hold Me Under"	3:09
7.	"Too Soon"	4:31
8.	"Beat 0033"	0:51
9.	"The Sun I"	1:31
10.	"The Sun II"	3:38
11.	"Sleep"	5:47
12.	"Union"	4:17
13.	"The Sun III"	3:13

== Personnel ==
Snakdakatal

- Joseph Clough: – guitar, synthesisers
- Phoebe Cockburn: – vocals, synthesisers
- Sean Heathcliff: – vocals, guitar
- Jarrah Mccarty-Smith: – bass guitar
- Barna Nemeth: – drums

Recording details

- Dann Hume: – producer, mixer at The Stables Studios, Melbourne.
- Alex Gooden: – audio engineer
- David Walker: – mastering engineer Stepford Audio, Melbourne
