= Bitemarks and Bloodstains =

Single by Finch

from the album Say Hello to Sunshine
- Released: May 17, 2005
- Genre: Post-hardcore
- Length: 4:39
- Label: Geffen
- Songwriters: Marc Allen, Nate Barcalow, Derek Doherty, Alex Pappas, Randy Strohmeyer
- Producer: Jason Cupp

Finch singles chronology
| "New Beginnings" (2003) | "Bitemarks and Bloodstains" (2005) | "Bury White" (2010) |

"Bitemarks and Bloodstains" is a song by the American rock band Finch. It is the twelfth track on the band's second studio album Say Hello to Sunshine, and was released as a single on May 17, 2005, through Geffen Records. "Bitemarks and Bloodstains" was released to radio on June 21, 2005. It was subsequently released through other labels internationally in a variety of formats with various bonus tracks. Vocalist Nate Barcalow said "Bitemarks and Bloodstains" was the first song Finch wrote for Say Hello to Sunshine and it "makes the transition between the old and the new sound."

== Music video ==
Finch released a music video directed by Michael Palmieri for "Bitemarks and Bloodstains" in July 2005. The video opens with an Emergency Alert System message before showing various people in a single neighborhood frantically trying to pack up their cars and evade a cataclysmic event, which is portrayed as an ominous vortex in the sky. A traffic jam eventually stops the fleeing people, forcing them to retreat on foot. At the end of the video, the vortex explodes, causing everyone in the neighborhood to vanish without a trace. The plot of the video is inter-spliced with footage of Finch performing in a living room.

== Reception ==
"Bitemarks and Bloodstains" was met with an average to negative reception by music critics. Writing for AbsolutePunk, Scott Weber said the song, "doesn't even sound like new Finch. It's completely boring and predictable. The build-up, while intended to be dramatic, is murdered by the chorus being repeated over and over again." Writing for Sputnikmusic, Ryan Flatley said, "Songs such as 'A Piece of Mind,' 'Brother Bleed Brother,' and 'Bitemarks and Bloodstains' are all good songs, just nothing blares out in me that makes it individually great."

== Track listings ==
=== Digital single ===
1. "Bitemarks and Bloodstains"

=== CD single ===
1. "Bitemarks and Bloodstains"
2. "Worms of the Earth" (remix)
  - "Bitemarks and Bloodstains" (music video)

=== CD promo single ===
1. "Bitemarks and Bloodstains" (radio edit)
2. "Bitemarks and Bloodstains" (album version)

=== UK 7" vinyl single #1 ===
1. "Bitemarks and Bloodstains"
2. "Worms of the Earth" (remix)

=== UK 7" vinyl single #2 ===
1. "Bitemarks and Bloodstains"
2. "What It Is to Burn" (BBC Radio 1 session)
