= Snakadaktal =

Australian indie-dream pop band

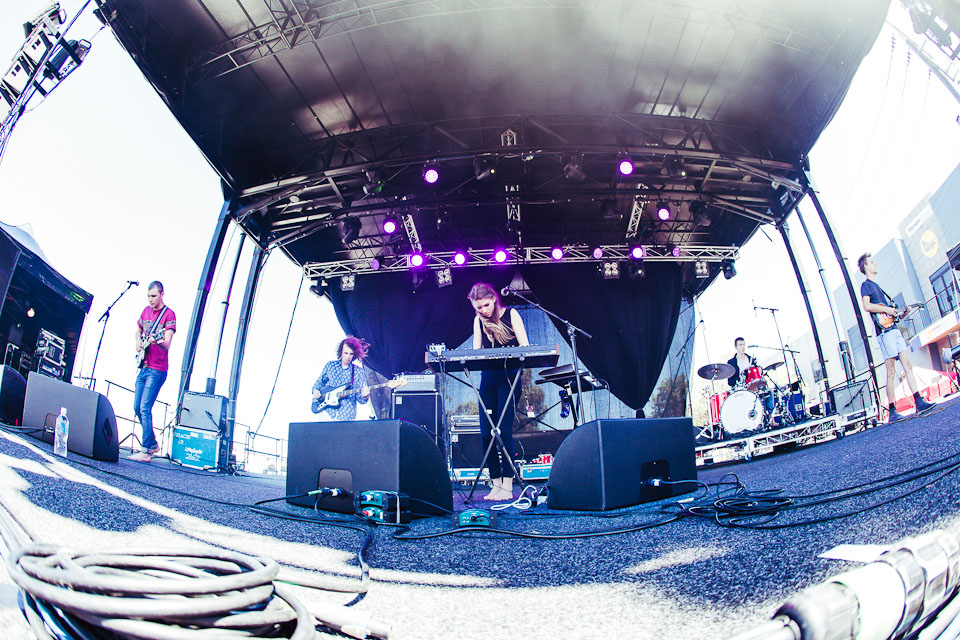
- Snakadaktal performing at the Melbourne Laneway Festival in February 2013

Background information
- Origin: Melbourne, Victoria, Australia
- Genres: Indie pop, dream pop
- Years active: 2010–2014
- Labels: I Oh You; Liberation
- Past members: Sean Heathcliff; Phoebe Go; Joseph Clough; Jarrah Mccarty-Smith; Barna Nemeth
- Website: snakadaktal.com

Snakadaktal were an Australian five-piece indie pop/dream pop band, which formed in 2009 in Melbourne, Victoria and broke up on 16 March 2014. The band consists of Sean Heathcliff (guitar, vocals, synthesizers), Phoebe Go (vocals, synthesizers) Joseph Clough (guitar), Jarrah Mccarty-Smith (bass), and Barna Nemeth (drums).

== History ==
Snakadaktal were named the Triple J Unearthed High winners for 2011. Following their success on Triple J, the band signed a record deal with I Oh You Records.

On 25 November 2011, Snakadaktal released their debut EP Snakadaktal with I Oh You. The two singles "Chimera" and "Air" from their self-titled EP achieved high rotation on Triple J, with "Air" becoming the third-most played track on Triple J the week it premiered.

Snakadaktal's debut EP reached number 26 on the digital ARIA Charts in 2011. Their track "Air" was ranked number 22 in the Triple J Hottest 100, 2011 and their song "Dance Bear" was voted number 93 in the Triple J Hottest 100, 2012.

The band's debut album, Sleep in the Water, was released on 2 August 2013. "Hung on Tight" was the first official single from the album, released 24 June 2013. "Fall Underneath" was released as the second single in November 2013.

On 16 March 2014, Snakadaktal announced their breakup, stating "Today, collectively, we feel that it is time to move onto different pursuits that we each individually wish to explore." On 17 March 2014, the band released a collection of demos and unreleased tracks for free on Bandcamp.

== Band members ==
- Phoebe Go – vocals, synthesizers
- Sean Heathcliff – vocals, guitar
- Joseph Clough – guitar, synthesizers
- Jarrah Mccarty-Smith – bass
- Barna Nemeth – drums

== Discography ==
=== Studio albums ===
Year	Album details	Peak chart positions
Year	Album details	AUS
2013	Sleep in the Water: Released: 2 August 2013; Label: Liberation Music, I Oh You; Formats: CD, LP, digital download	9

=== Other albums ===
Year	Album details	Notes
2014	Treasures (2010–2014): Released: 17 March 2014; Label: Liberation Music, I Oh You; Formats: CD, LP, digital download	Collection demos and unreleased tracks

=== EPs ===
- Snakadaktal (25 November 2011, I Oh You)
- The Sun II (3 January 2014, 2014 Liberation Music)
