= Letters to You =

Single by Finch

from the album What It Is to Burn
- Released: April 22, 2003
- Genre: Emo; pop punk
- Length: 4:29
- Label: Drive-Thru
- Songwriter: Nate Barcalow

Finch singles chronology
"What It Is to Burn" (2003)	"Letters to You" (2003)	"New Beginnings" (2003)

"Letters to You" is the second single released by American rock band Finch. It debuted at #39 in the UK, but fell out of the top 40 the following week.

== Track listing ==
All tracks are written by Finch.

CD
No.	Title	Length
1.	"Letters to You" (Album Version)	3:20
2.	"Worms of the Earth"	2:35
3.	"New Kid"	4:14
