= What It Is to Burn =

Studio album by Finch
- Released: March 12, 2002
- Recorded: June–September 2001
- Studios: Big Fish, Encinitas, California
- Genres: Emo; pop-punk; post-hardcore; nu metal; hardcore punk
- Length: 61:13
- Labels: MCA; Drive-Thru
- Producers: Chris Fuderich; Mark Trombino

Finch chronology
Falling into Place (2001)	What It Is to Burn (2002)	Say Hello to Sunshine (2005)

Singles from What It Is to Burn
- 1. "What It Is to Burn" Released: January 2003; 2. "Letters to You" Released: April 22, 2003; 3. "New Beginnings"/"What It Is to Burn" Released: August 25, 2003

What It Is to Burn is the debut studio album by American rock band Finch. It was released on March 12, 2002, through MCA and Drive-Thru Records. After finalizing their line-up, Finch signed to Drive-Thru. Recording for the album took place between June and September 2001 with producer Mark Trombino. A music video for "Letters to You" was released in January 2003. The title-track "What It Is to Burn" was released as the lead single in January 2003, followed by the single "Letters to You" in April of that year. "New Beginnings"/"What It Is to Burn" was released as the third and final single on a double A-side in August 2003. "Letters to You" charted at number 39 on the UK Singles Chart, while "What It Is to Burn" charted within the top 40 of the US Alternative Songs and Mainstream Rock charts.

Initial accompanying tours for promotion consisted of several stints in the United States and the United Kingdom with the likes of Moth, the Starting Line and New Found Glory. The band later appeared on the 2002 Warped Tour and at the Reading and Leeds Festivals. What It Is to Burn is primarily a pop punk and emo release, that was also classed as hardcore punk and post-hardcore. The album received generally positive reviews from music critics.

On the US Billboard 200, What It Is to Burn charted at number 99, while it reached number 177 on the UK Albums Chart. As of October 2007, the album has sold over 400,000 copies worldwide. It has since been viewed as a landmark release for the emo and post-hardcore scenes. Finch embarked on a celebratory 10th anniversary tour in 2013 across the US, Europe, Japan, and Australia.

== Background and production ==
Finch originally formed under the name Numb, with Nate Barcalow on vocals, Alex Linares on guitar, Derek Doherty on bass and Alex Pappas on drums. The members, who had met each other through mutual friends, had all been in a prior band, the HIVs, which had broken up after writing two songs. Guitarist Randy Strohmeyer was invited to join Finch after they saw him play with his band Evitca Fresh. Strohmeyer became friends with Drive-Thru Records' owner Richard Reines, following a fan letter he had sent in a few years earlier about the Rx Bandits. Strohmeyer had suggested that the label check out his former band, which they showed no interest in. Reines was skeptical about Strohmeyer's new band but due a favor that he felt in debt with him, decided to invite Finch to record a studio session, a session that happened sometime in mid 2000 and which they recorded an early version of the song "Awake". Upon hearing the songs that they have been working on, Reines was impressed by their sound and reportedly offered a contract to the band on the spot after inviting his sister, Stefanie Reines, co-owner of Drive-Thru Records, to witness the band play. The band was then scheduled on November 26, 2000 to play at a "Drive-Thru Records Night" show where they were formally introduced to the label. It is reported that they played for an audience of 700 people at the Chain Reaction, Anaheim, California. A month after this show, the band released some self produced demos, among these demos there were early versions of the songs "Letters to You" (known as "I Want" at the time), "Grey Matter", "Ender", "New Kid", "Perfection Through Silence", and a never officially released song titled "Song 3". Another song that was recorded during this session was a cover of "With or Without You" by U2. All of these demo songs were recorded at Pappa's basement.

Pre-production and demos were done at DML Studios in Escondido, California, in February and April 2001. Finch began recording What It Is to Burn in June of that year at Big Fish Studios in Encinitas, California, with producer Mark Trombino. Strohmeyer was a fan of Trombino's production work, while Pappas enjoyed Bleed American (2001) by Jimmy Eat World, which Trombino produced. The Reines' sent Finch's demos to Trombino, who was interested in producing them. The band started tracking guitars for the album in July 2001.

Strohmeyer used Fender guitars and Marshall amplifiers, while Linares used ESP guitars and Mesa amplifiers. Trombino with the guitar effects on What It is to Burn. Recording continued throughout 2001, going into August and September. Daryl Palumbo of Glassjaw performs guest vocals on "Grey Matter" and "Project Mayhem". Doherty, Linares and Strohmeyer first met Palumbo at a Deftones show, and later when they played with Earth Crisis, and kept in contact with him. While they were recording for the album, the band asked Palumbo if he wanted to participate, prompting in him flying out to the band. Trombino completed programming before he mixed the recordings at The Robot Factory in Los Angeles, California; Stephen Marcussen mastered the tracks at Marcussen Mastering.

== Composition and lyrics ==
Musically, What It Is to Burn has been classed as emo, hardcore punk, pop punk, post-hardcore, and nu metal with sporadic touches of electronic music. The album received comparisons to the music of Glassjaw, New Found Glory, Linkin Park, and Blink-182. Barcalow switches between crooning and screaming on What It Is to Burn; though he has a pop punk-inspired vocal delivery, his screams were compared to the likes of Palumbo and Deftones frontman Chino Moreno. The writing process revolved around Finch jamming. Linares said they could sometimes write a song in two hours, and at other times take a whole day. Collectively, Strohmeyer said it took a year to write all the material on the album, which was done at either Strohmeyer or Pappas' home. He also said that if they did not go with Trombino, they would be "less electronics", adding that he was "such a genius when it comes to programming [...] he came up with some of the most amazing beats". They had an acoustic song, "Once Upon My Night Stand", which was dropped as it did not fit the atmosphere of the album.

The opening track, "New Beginnings", begins with a distorted guitar fading in, before the song shifts to aggressive power chords and octave parts. The song sets the tone for What It Is to Burn with its memorable melodies and tuneful choruses. Barcalow said "Letters to You" was about the "emotion of being away from somebody and missing them and trying to keep them happy through communication because you can’t physically see them". His vocals on the song border on near-screamo in places. Despite the track having three-part harmonies, it was written when the only members in the band who could sing were Barcalow and Strohmeyer. Palumbo's singing voice on "Grey Matter" recalled Bad Brains frontman H.R. "Awake" was one of Finch's oldest songs, which Barcalow said is about a couple resolving an argument. "Project Mayhem" initially existed as a two-minute track, before Trombino altered it into the final version, and incorporated programming. "Ender" begins with a subdued intro that steadily coalesces by the third minute, when it progresses with a constant piano part, and ends with an ambient instrumental section. "What It Is to Burn" is written from the perspective of a man in hell sending a letter to his partner. Barcalow said it dealt with loneliness and being able to relate with someone that is also experiencing that same emotion.

== Release and promotion ==
Finch's debut EP Falling into Place was released in October 2001, featuring early versions of "Letters to You" and "Perfection Through Silence". A music video for "Letters to You" was released in January 2002. Doherty said the video was "[a]trocious," while Linares called it "[b]asically a piece of shit." On January 13, 2002, "Untitled" was posted online. What It Is to Burn was released on March 12, 2002, as a joint release between MCA and Drive-Thru Records. The artwork features an ice bucket and measurements, and a beaker with boiling liquid; Doherty said the band "just wanted some cool imagery." The art direction and design were done by P.R. Brown, who also did the photography with Kris McCaddon. Initial pressings of the album contained a demo version of "What It Is to Burn", produced by Chris Fuderich. The demo was replaced on the later pressings with a re-recorded version, produced by Trombino. The United Kingdom edition, released on June 2, 2002, included an acoustic version of "Letters to You" and the "What It Is to Burn" demo as bonus tracks.

Finch filmed a new music video for "Letters to You" in mid-April 2002, in a hostel basement in Hollywood. It was directed by Richard Reines and Brad Scott. The video premiered on Refused TV on May 24, 2002. Around the end of 2002, the band signed to MCA Records. MCA had a distribution deal that allowed them to acquire Drive-Thru Records' bands over time. It was aided by the assistance of Mark Hoppus and Tom DeLonge of Blink-182, who had signed Finch to their management company, as they contacted the label about signing them. In January 2003, "What It Is to Burn" was released to radio stations across the United States as the lead single from What Is It to Burn. Strohmeyer said that up to that point, "Letters to You" served as an "unofficial single" as radio stations were picking up the song and adding it to their rotation, which was "really cool because we didn't have to spend a dime" to promote it. A music video was filmed for "What It Is to Burn" with director by director Alexander Kosta. The video was posted online on February 12, 2003. In March of that year, Punknews.org held a contest where fans could win a copy of the album on vinyl. On April 22, 2003, "Letters to You" was released on CD as What Is It to Burn's second single. Two versions of the CD single were released: the first with "Worms of the Earth" and "New Kid" as extra tracks, and the second with live versions of "Perfection Through Silence" and "Letters to You" as bonus tracks. Following this, "New Beginnings" and "What It Is to Burn" were released on a double A-sided as the album's third and final single on August 25, 2003.

== Tours ==
A proposed September 2001 tour with the Starting Line and the Movielife was cancelled following the September 11 attacks. Following the release of What It Is to Burn, Finch went on tour with Moth. In April and May 2002, the band toured with Brand New and the Starting Line. Following on from this, the group went on a UK tour with New Found Glory. Between late June and mid-August, Finch performed on the 2002 Warped Tour as part of the Drive-Thru Records stage. In late August 2002, the band performed at the Reading and Leeds Festivals in the UK. The following month, Finch performed a few shows in Japan. In October and November 2002, the band embarked on a tour across the US with New Found Glory, Something Corporate and Further Seems Forever, and appeared at the Smoke Out Festival. In the last two months of the year, Finch went on a UK tour with From Autumn to Ashes as well as Coheed and Cambria.

The band toured with From Autumn to Ashes across the US in January and February 2003. Allister were initially planned to be the support act, before they were replaced by Steel Train. In February, the band went on a co-headlining US tour with the Used, with support from Steel Train and From Autumn to Ashes. Following on from this, Finch continued touring with the Movielife, Senses Fail and A Static Lullaby until early March 2003. That same month, the band went on a tour of the UK with Brand New. In April 2003, they performed at Skate and Surf Fest, and appeared on Late Night with Conan O'Brien. In early May 2003, Finch performed at two shows as part of MTV's Campus Invasion tour. The following month, the band appeared on Jimmy Kimmel Live!, and performed at the KROQ Weenie Roast festival. In early July 2003, Finch appeared on Last Call with Carson Daly. The following month, they performed at Furnace Fest, before playing on the main stage at the Reading and Leeds Festivals.

== Critical reception ==
Professional ratings
Review scores
Source	Rating
AllMusic	4/5 stars
Drowned in Sound	4/5
In Music We Trust	B
Melodic	4/5 stars
Ultimate Guitar	10/10
Sputnikmusic	3.0/5

What It Is to Burn was met with generally positive reviews from music critics. AllMusic reviewer Jason D. Taylor opened his piece by calling the album "phenomenal," noting that Finch rode the "thin line" between hardcore punk and pop punk, preserving a "trademark sound that stands out from the crowd." He also wrote that the album "exemplifies everything that is right in the punk scene", citing its emotional vulnerability, the "agonizing fury of hardcore" and the positive "tones of pop-punk." Amy Sciarretto of CMJ New Music Report was impressed with the band's ability to not be pigeon-holed into one specific sound, observing that the album showcases their "delicious blend of infection and perky rock," incorporating Glassjaw, Thursday and Jimmy Eat World "into a potent Molotov cocktail."

Drowned in Sound writer Peter White referred to What It Is to Burn as an "absolutely gut smokingly fantastic record." FasterLouder's Roby Anson described it as an "album of sadness, gladness, big chunky guitar riffs, smart chord progressions and a rhythm section that chugs along nicely in each song." LAS Magazine writer Andy Vaughn noted the Glassjaw influence added "a great deal of intensity" to the album, which he felt "would be missing otherwise." He commended Finch for making an "extremely strong debut." Melodic webmaster Johan Wippsson said the album has "the perfect mix of good melodies with the extra edge," and complimented Trominbo's "great" production style. He lauded the "very consistent" nature of the tracks, "which are on a very high level all the time." The team from Ultimate Guitar hailed the album, saying it "kicks so much ass" and lacks any skippable tracks.

Sputnikmusic emeritus Ryan Flatley praised "Grey Matter" and "Project Mayhem" for their energy, but said that the album turned out to be a bit of a disappointment due to the large amount of hype surrounding its release. Exclaim!'s Amber Authier commented that Finch "doesn't do a bad job" of merging punk rock and metal together. However, she felt that the lyrical content on What It Is to Burn came across as a "little too deep, separating the two styles instead of blending them into something a little different." Lina Lecaro of the Los Angeles Times said the band bounced "between soothing croons and throat-burning wails, metallic riffs and bubbly beats," a fusion that "kept things interesting ... even if the shifts weren't always seamless." While Barcalow "proved himself to be a versatile vocalist on tunes ... his range didn't quite make up for his lack of charisma," Lecaro added. Kerrang! reviewer Paul Travers criticized the titles of the songs on the album, saying that Finch were "in need of a good slap ... you can almost taste the salty tang of tears spilling out of the speakers."

== Commercial performance and legacy ==
What It Is to Burn charted at number 99 on the US Billboard 200 chart. By April 2003, the album had sold over 200,000 copies in the US. It charted at number 177 on the UK Albums Chart, while "Letters to You" reached number 39 on the UK Singles Chart. "What It Is to Burn" peaked at number 15 on the US Alternative Songs chart and number 35 on the Mainstream Rock chart. By October 2007, What It Is to Burn had sold over 400,000 copies worldwide.

Metal Hammer ranked the album at number 17 on their best albums of 2002 list. Loudwire included "What It Is to Burn" at number 47 on their list of the best hard rock songs of the 21st century. In 2019, Rock Sound ranked the album at number 107 on their list of the 250 greatest albums released since the publication's debut in 1999. Shezhaad Jiwani of Chart Attack said What It Is to Burn was one of emo's landmark releases, noting it for leading the genre alongside albums by Glassjaw and the Used. In 2013, Finch celebrated the album's 10th anniversary by performing it in its entirety. The celebration was initially intended for one show, before being expanded to two US tours, a European tour, and performances in Japan and Australia. Independent label Tragic Hero Records released a live video album of the anniversary celebrations in January 2014.

What It Is to Burn has been a massive influence on Saosin's Saosin (2006), Young Guns' All Our Kings Are Dead (2010), A Day to Remember's What Separates Me from You (2010), D.R.U.G.S.'s D.R.U.G.S. (2011), and the Amity Affliction's Chasing Ghosts (2012). Alternative Press said the title-track was "one of the landmark moments" for the post-hardcore genre. Sleeping with Sirens frontman Kellin Quinn singled out Finch's mix of screaming and singing vocal parts on the song as an influence on him. Equally, Jeremy McKinnon said the album is the reason A Day to Remember formed. Senses Fail frontman Buddy Nielsen has cited What It Is to Burn as an influence on the band's early work, and Josh Franceschi of You Me at Six has expressed admiration for it.

== Track listing ==
All songs written by Finch. All songs produced by Mark Trombino, except for What It Is to Burn (Demo Version) produced by Chris Fuderich.

What It Is to Burn standard track listing
No.	Title	Length
1.	"New Beginnings"	4:02
2.	"Letters to You" (Album Version)	3:20
3.	"Post Script"	2:50
4.	"Grey Matter" (featuring Daryl Palumbo)	2:40
5.	"Perfection Through Silence" (Album Version)	3:12
6.	"Awake"	4:49
7.	"Without You Here"	4:10
8.	"Stay with Me"	4:05
9.	"Project Mayhem" (featuring Daryl Palumbo)	5:19
10.	"Untitled"	4:13
11.	"Three Simple Words"	4:39
12.	"Ender"	13:28

First pressing bonus track
No.	Title	Length
13.	"What It Is to Burn" (Demo Version)	4:51

Reissue bonus track
No.	Title	Length
13.	"What It Is to Burn"	4:29

UK bonus tracks
No.	Title	Length
14.	"Letters to You" (Acoustic)	3:40
15.	"What It Is to Burn" (Demo Version)	4:51

== Personnel ==
Personnel per booklet.

Finch

- Alex Pappas – drums
- Derek Doherty – bass guitar
- Nate Barcalow – vocals
- Randy Strohmeyer – guitar
- Alex Linares – guitar

Additional musicians

- Daryl Palumbo – guest vocals (tracks 4 and 9)
- Mark Trombino – programming

Production

- Mark Trombino – producer, recording, engineer, mixing
- Stephen Marcussen – mastering

Design

- P.R. Brown – art direction, design, photography
- Kris McCaddon – photography

== Charts ==
Chart performance for What It Is to Burn
Chart (2002)	Peak position
UK Albums Chart	177
US Billboard 200	99
