= Calerway =

Australian musical group

- Origin: Perth, Western Australia, Australia
- Genres: Indie rock, alternative rock
- Years active: 2005–2009
- Label: Taperjean Records
- Past members: Jaun-Paul Rebola; Phil O'Reilly; James Watroba; Cameron Edwards; Ryan de Rozario; Brenton Kirke

Calerway were an Australian rock band from Perth, Western Australia.

== History ==
Calerway were formed in 2005 by Jaun-Paul Rebola, Phillip O'Reilly and Daniel Ramsdale after the ending of their previous band Saving Rushmore. In need of a drummer James 'Cheda' Watroba, already in Whitechapel & Kerb, accepted the role as a side project.

Shortly after came the departure of Daniel Ramsdale and the addition of Cameron Edwards, also acting in a side project capacity due to his role in Last Year's Hero.

After doing a few competitions and low profile shows, including the 2005 AmpFest, the band turned some industry heads in their home town and following the release of their debut EP A Letter of Credence, (tracked before the band ever hit a stage) went on to support Anberlin, Kisschasy, Behind Crimson Eyes, Something With Numbers and Less than Jake within a three-month period. Late 2005 also saw them securing a signing with indie label Valet Records.

In 2006 Calerway toured south-east Asia, including a main stage spot at Singapore's annual Baybeats festival. The band also played support for Gyroscope, Alkaline Trio, The Hot Lies; Bodyjar, Evergreen Terrace, Birds of Tokyo and Silverstein and also toured Victoria playing a number of gigs. 2006 also saw the national release of their EP (Modern Music/Sony BMG), with airplay on national youth broadcaster Triple J and their video clip played on ABCTV's rage. The band also performed at the Gravity Games H2O in December, the Perth leg of the Big Day Out, Monsterfest '07 in January and WAMi festival in February 2007.

In July 2007 the band released the single "Just Drive/Believe It", which also featured the songs "Just Drive", "Believe It" and "All We Are". To promote the release, they toured with Angela's Dish [NSW]. Their debut album was scheduled to be released before the fall of 2007, but was pushed back till the early part of 2008. During the time of the delay, Calerway added keys and synth to their music, with the inclusion of Ryan De Rozario and were set to introduce a complete album with new tracks. Calerway were the featured support band on The Veronicas The Hook Me Up Tour in Perth on 30 November and 1 December at the Burswood Theatre.

On 27 February 2008, Calerway posted three new songs on their MySpace page as a preview to their upcoming debut album which was now scheduled to be released in May. The songs that were added to the site were "A Drink with the Devil", "Jacknife" and "Northern Lights". The band debuted the album with performances at Perth's Foundry on 7 May and at Fremantle's Mojo's on 11 May. An All Ages show at HQ was put on, along with a main show at the Amplifier Bar on 10 May, at which Calerway officially released their new album, "Midnight Mercenaries". The band was able to put on 5 amazing shows and selling out the Amplifier Bar on Saturday Night. In July, the band signed with Taperjean Records, that is home to not only promising locals Fifty Sixx, Closure in Moscow and The Mission in Motion, but also internationals Copeland, Cartel and As Tall As Lions. The band recently did a tour of the eastern states of Australia, and supported American band The Matches in September.

Late 2008 saw the departure of their drummer, James 'Cheda' Watroba, for personal reasons. He was quickly replaced by Brenton Kirke. In September 2009, it was announced that Calerway had broken up. Edwards and Watroba moved to Melbourne to play with the Dirty Secrets whilst Kirke left for other projects. The remaining members decided to work on other projects as Phil joined the Perth band The Chase while JP became a producer which still works closely with The Chase.

In 2010, JP Rebola was involved in a traffic accident where the vehicle he was travelling in was struck from behind while travelling on Roe Highway in Canning Vale, Western Australia. He escaped serious injury after being pulled from the burning wreckage to safety by a passing motorist, who went on to win the Australian Bravery Award.

== Members ==
Former members

- Jaun-Paul Rebola – lead vocals, rhythm (2005–2009)
- Cameron Edwards – bass, vocals (2005–2009)
- Phil O'Reilly – guitar (2005–2009)
- James Watroba – drums (2005–2008)
- Brenton Kirke - drums (2008–2009)
- Ryan de Rozario - keyboards (2007–2009)

Touring/Other

- Shernon Hague – bass (2005 Touring)
- Antonio Cassisi - drums (Saving Rushmore)
- Daniel Ramsdale - bass (Saving Rushmore)

== Discography ==
=== Albums/EPs ===
- A Letter of Credence - Valet Records (1 May 2006)
- Midnight Mercenaries - Taperjean Records (20 September 2008)

=== Singles ===
Year	Title	Album
2005	"Loaded"	A Letter of Credence
2005	"Always Away"	A Letter of Credence
2007	"Just Drive"	Just Drive/Believe It
2007	"Believe It"	Just Drive/Believe It
2008	"Northern Lights"	Midnight Mercenaries
2008	"Blood. Sweat. Years"	Midnight Mercenaries

=== Videos ===
Year	Song	Album
2005	"Loaded"	A Letter of Credence
2005	"Eyes Don't Lie"	A Letter of Credence
2007	"All We Are"	Big Day Out 2007
2008	"Blood. Sweat. Years"	Midnight Mercenaries
2009	"Tell Them Lies"	Midnight Mercenaries
