= Avalon Drive =

Australian rock band

- Origin: Brisbane, Queensland, Australia
- Genres: Rock
- Years active: 2005–2008, 2011, 2021
- Labels: Valet/MGM; Sony BMG
- Members: Damion J Douglas; Shane Holmes; Wil Morris
- Past members: BJ Dillewaard; Ryan Kennedy; Shane O'Keeffe

Avalon Drive are an Australian rock band from Brisbane, originally formed in 2005. They released three extended plays, Avalon Drive (2005), The City of Burnt Out Lights (2006) and The View from Afar (2008) before splitting in 2008. They reformed in 2021 as a trio with original members, Damion J Douglass on lead vocals, Shane Holmes on drums and Wil Morris on lead guitar and synthesiser.

== History ==
=== 2005 ===
Avalon Drive were formed as a rock group in 2005 in Brisbane by Benjamin John "BJ" Dillewaard on keyboards, Damion James Douglass (as Damion Page) on lead vocals, Shane Anthony Holmes on drums, Ryan Lloyd Kennedy on bass guitar and William "Wil" Morris on lead guitar and backing vocals. The band members had been school mates and played in various bands in the previous four years. Douglass and Holmes had been members of Prefix, which issued a self-titled extended play (EP) back in 2003.

Avalon Drive released their debut self-titled EP in May 2005 on Valet Records/MGM Distribution. The Metal Forge's reviewer, Justin Donnelly rated the music disc at seven-out-of-ten, "first class all the way, and by far the most promising emo-rock act on the Australian scene." However he noticed that the bonus DVD, is "bit of a miss", which "tends to lose the plot mid way through." The Brisbane group supported international artists, Anberlin and Crowned King. The EP provided two singles, "This Simple Life" and "Outside Alone", received high rotation on both Channel V and Nova FM Both singles were co-written by Douglass with Jarrod Craik. Donnelly felt "Outside Alone" was a "huge anthem like number" and the EP's "obvious stand out track."

=== 2006 ===
Avalon Drive toured Australia variously supporting the Veronicas, INXS, the All-American Rejects, Yellowcard, Houston Calls and Matchbook Romance. In March 2006 when Avalon Drive supported Yellowcard on their Australian tour, they played to a crowd of over 3000 at the Luna Park Sydney's Big Top. They had to cut short their set after their fans broke the crowd barrier, forcing the Houston Calls to abandon their performance. Nevertheless Houston Calls asked the Brisbane band to support their sole Sydney show. Avalon Drive headlined three of their own tours and performed on Rove Live.

They released their six track second EP The City of Burnt Out Lights in June 2006 via Valet Records/MGM Distribution. Ben Hermann of BMA Magazine observed, "[it] had kick-ass songs that kept you coming back for more." It provided the single, "Get Up", which they performed nationally as Rove Live's house band. They were guest performers on Toasted TV, also on Network Ten. "Get Up" was described as " catchy, mood-changing melodic rock/pop."

=== 2007 ===
The five-piece started 2007 by supporting Hoobastank in February; they also joined Fall Out Boy on their Australian tour, as their single "Make Your Move" debuted on radio nationally and was released commercially as a digital single on 21 May 2007. Douglass said the track was "a very small taste of what is to come." It was produced by Melbourne producer, Forrester Savell, (The Butterfly Effect, Human Nature, Karnivool). "We all have very different ideas when it comes to writing so working with Forester really helped bring all that together," said Douglass. It is "an energetic rock song full of mood lifting spirit," according to Holmes who notes their March 2007 arena shows with Fall Out Boy as the highlight of his musical career. Douglass avers, "Lyrically it's about decision-making, it is about change and procrastination."

In August 2007 Avalon Drive announced that Morris was leaving the band for personal reasons. According to Morris, "I worked about four meters away from [Douglass] every day, and he didn't speak to me for two weeks." Morris was replaced by former St Lucia singer, Shane O'Keeffe, who took up guitar and backing vocals. At the end of 2007 the band members started writing for their proposed debut album. "We don't care how long this process takes" said vocalist Douglass. "We are all very different and all want individual things inside our music so putting a time limit on that is not something we are wanting to do. We have had to get over some pretty huge obstacles this year (2007) and the future is looking so good for us. So, until then".

=== 2008 and beyond ===
Dillewaard departed Avalon Drive in early 2008. After two months and three rounds in the first Tooheys Extra Dry UncharTED competition of 2008, the group won a record deal with Sony BMG. In August they previewed tracks from their third EP, The View from Afar at a music venue, The Zoo, Fortitude Valley. They undertook a co-headlining tour of south eastern Australia with the Sundance Kids during August and September.

The band's four track third EP, The View from Afar, appeared in October and reached No. 74 on the ARIA Top 100 Physical Singles chart. In November 2008, Avalon Drive released a statement, mid-tour, saying the band had separated due to "irreconcilable differences" with all unfilled tour dates cancelled and pre-sold tickets refunded.

Avalon Drive founders Douglass, Holmes and Morris performed a one-off reunion show at The Hi-Fi Bar in Brisbane on 5 February 2011. In 2020 Douglass and Holmes formed an indie electronic duo, Driver, which issued an EP, Crossover.

== Band members ==
- Damion James Douglass (a.k.a. Damion Page or Damion Page-Douglass) – lead vocals (2005–2008, 2011, 2021)
- Shane Anthony Holmes – drums, samples (2005–2008, 2011, 2021)
- William Morris – lead guitar, synthesiser, backing vocals (2005–2007, 2011, 2021)

Former members

- BJ Dillewaard – keyboards (2005–2008)
- Ryan Kennedy – bass guitar (2005–2008)
- Shane O'Keeffe – guitar, backing vocals (2007–2008)

== Discography ==
=== Extended plays ===
- Avalon Drive (2 May 2005) – Valet Records/MGM Distribution (VAL001/MGM AVD004)
1. "Seven Minutes"
2. "The Simple Life"
3. "Outside Alone"
4. "At War with Butterflies"
5. "Several Minutes" (live acoustic)
6. "Outside Alone" (live acoustic)

Bonus disc

1. "Behind the Band" (limited edition DVD)
- The City of Burnt Out Lights (12 June 2006) – Valet Records/MGM Distribution (MGM LEGS01)
1. "Introduction"
2. "Emptiness with Grace"
3. "Get Up"
4. "That Very Day"
5. "Pictures"
6. "Too Many Reasons"
- The View from Afar (2008) – Sony BMG (SBM 88697370302)
1. "Life Support"
2. "The Truth"
3. "Last One Standing"
4. "Make Your Move"

=== Music videos ===
1. "This Simple Life" (live, 2006)
2. "Outside Alone" (2006)
3. The Making of "Outside Alone" (2006)
4. "Make Your Move" (2007)
5. The Making of "Make Your Move" (2007)
6. "Last One Standing" (2008)
7. The Making of "Last One Standing" (2008)

== Tour ==
=== Supported ===
1. Anberlin (July 2005)
2. Rufio (July 2005)
3. Crowned King (July 2005)
4. Yellowcard (March 2006)
5. Houston Calls (March 2006)
6. Matchbook Romance (May 2006)
7. The Veronicas (August 2006)
8. The All-American Rejects (August 2006)
9. INXS (September 2006)
10. Hoobastank (February 2007)
11. Fall Out Boy (March 2007)

=== Headlining ===
1. The Get Up Tour w/Angelas Dish (Jun 2006)
2. Pictures Tour (Sep 2006)
3. All Age Encore (Oct–Dec 2006)
4. The View From Afar Tour (Nov–Dec 2008)
5. The Residency Tour (2008)
6. The Reunion Tour (Feb 2011)

=== Festivals ===
1. Rapid (June 2005, 2006, 2008)
2. Overcranked (March 2006)
3. Ruckus (16 December 2006)
4. Beats on the Beach (New Years Day, 2007)
5. Come Together (June 2007)
6. Brisbane Royal Show (Saturday, 9 August 2008)

=== TV appearances ===
1. Rove Live (2006)
2. Toasted TV (2006)
3. ARIA Awards (2006)
4. Channel 31 (2006)
5. AAA TV (2007)
6. The Shak (2007)
7. MTV UncharTED Showcase (2008)
8. Mornings with Kerri-Anne (2008)
9. WhatUWant (2008)

=== Radio interviews/performances ===
1. Nova 106.9 (2008)
