= Say Hello to Sunshine =

Studio album by Finch
- Released: June 7, 2005
- Recorded: May 2004 – January 2005
- Studio: Music Friends; Big Fish; Jordan's old house; Signature Sound; Ocean
- Genre: Post-hardcore
- Length: 50:17
- Label: Drive-Thru; Geffen
- Producer: Jason Cupp; Ben Moore; Finch

Finch chronology
What It Is to Burn (2002)	Say Hello to Sunshine (2005)	Finch (2008)

Singles from Say Hello to Sunshine
- 1. "Bitemarks and Bloodstains" Released: May 17, 2005

Say Hello to Sunshine is the second studio album by American rock band Finch. Following the release of their debut album What It Is to Burn (2002), the group signed to MCA Records, which soon afterwards was absorbed into Geffen Records. Drummer Alex Pappas left the band in early 2004 and was replaced by Marc Allen. This was the band's only studio album with Allen and also their last with original bassist Derek Doherty. Sessions for the next album took place at a variety of studios with Jason Cupp, Ben Moore and the band producing the proceedings. Prior to the album's release, the band went on tour in the US and Europe, and "Bitemarks and Bloodstains" was released as a single in May 2005. Say Hello to Sunshine was released in June; further tours of the US, the UK and Japan followed soon after.

Say Hello to Sunshine saw the band expanding their post-hardcore sound with different time signatures, heavier guitar riffs and breakdowns. Critical reaction to the album was mixed. Some were disappointed, having expected a similar sound to their previous material, whereas others embraced the change in direction. It sold 38,000 copies in its first week, charting at number 24 on the Billboard 200 in the process. It also charted in the UK, reaching number 48. The group celebrated the album's 10th anniversary by performing it in its entirety for one show in 2015.

== Background ==
The group's debut album What It Is to Burn was released in March 2002 as a joint release between major label MCA and independent label Drive-Thru Records. Around this time, the group signed to MCA Records. MCA had a distribution deal which allowed them to acquire Drive-Thru Records' bands over a period of time. Guitarist Randy Strohmeyer said that being on an independent label worked as a more co-operative arrangement: "You work together to push the album and you wanna scratch each other's back. When you go to a major, it's a corporation that's all it is. They don't really care about the music and they don't really care about you." By February 2003, the group were writing material for their next album. Bassist Derek Doherty said it would be as "diverse as the last record, but more mature."

Between June and July 2003, the band commenced pre-production on their second album, which was expected to be recorded in August with producer Mark Trombino, in line with an early 2004 release. The group was initially scheduled to appear on the Warped Tour, but withdrew preferring to work on new material. In August and September 2003, the group took a break from writing to play a handful of shows; the band were again expected to start recording in October. Around this time, MCA Records was absorbed by Universal Music Group subsidiary Geffen Records, which resulted in its staff and roster being moved to Geffen. Guitarist Alex Linares said they had "no choice" in being moved to Geffen; however, they were "still working with the same people ... [s]o nothing really changed for us."

== Writing and production ==
On January 10, 2004, drummer Alex Pappas left the group and was temporarily replaced by Marc Allen of Counterfit. Strohmeyer said Pappas was holding the band back, and they had spent six months trying to get him to work with the new style of songs they had written. Melodic reported in March 2004 that the group would start recording with Trombino in mid-April. However, Trombino was also unable to work with the material, prompting the band to use his engineer Jason Cupp instead. The band then began recording with Cupp and Ben Moore in May 2004. Sessions took place at Music Friends Studios, Big Fish Studios, Jordan's old house, Signature Sound Studios and Ocean Studios, with Cupp engineering all of the sessions. Cupp, Moore and the band produced almost all of the songs except for "A Piece of Mind", "Ravenous" and "The Casket of Roderick Usher", which were produced by Cupp and the band. In between recording, the group went on tour in July and September with Recover and Counterfit, and performed at the Strhessfest and Holiday Havoc festivals. After a break in December for the holidays, the band finished recording in January 2005. Collectively, the band had recorded 15–20 songs over the course of a year.

Cupp mixed the majority of the songs on Say Hello to Sunshine with the assistance of Alan Mason at Chalice Studios; "Ink", "Miro" and "Bitemarks and Bloodstains" were mixed by Rich Costey with the assistance of Claudius Mittendorpher at Avatar Studios. Finch were not happy with Cupp's initial attempts at mixing and wanted Costey to mix the entire record, but could not due to scheduling conflicts and him being too expensive. Despite this, Allen said that Cupp's mixes improved over time as he used Costey's mixes as a reference; "all we needed to say to [him] is 'something a little closer to this' [...] we got a basis for what we wanted and we could move forward from there." Eddie Schreyer then mastered the recordings at Oasis Mastering.

== Composition ==
Say Hello to Sunshine introduced odd time signatures, nu metal guitar riffs and breakdowns into the group's post-hardcore sound, creating a heavier sound than What It Is to Burn. Frontman Nate Barcalow said influences from Faith No More, Alice in Chains, Stone Temple Pilots and Nirvana had filtered into the release unintentionally; his vocals have been compared to Mike Patton of Faith No More. Linares said the record was "a little more aggressive and a little more 'raaah'" when compared to their past material. Discussing the album's title, Barcalow explained it was satire, before adding that they "hope this record is going to rip your face off." Strohmeyer said the album had an apocalyptic theme, going on to say that it was "very dark. It's kind of like, this is the last song you'll ever hear before the world blows up." The lyrics often feature references to blood, flesh, fire, death and various body parts. Cupp contributed shaker, tambourine and various percussion instruments to the songs.

Metal riffs feature frequently during the verse sections of "Insomniatic Meat"; Barcalow showcases his refined vocal ability in both the singing and screaming, with the latter developing from guttural growling to high-pitched wailing. A quiet interlude section follows, before it ends with gentle vocal harmonies alongside screaming. "Revelation Song" contains several tempo and time signature changes and is darker than their past material. Barcalow displays a new vocal style on the song, which was compared to Static-X and Powerman 5000. "Brother Bleed Brother" is a vocal-driven track, prominently displaying the band's musical evolution. The math rock breakdown incorporates portions of a later track on the album, "Ink". "Ink" is a through-and-through math rock song, with the intro being compared to Gatsbys American Dream.

"Hopeless Host" is about Barcalow's body "not being a very good host for health." The punk rock track "A Man Alone" features off-beats in the verse sections. Nick Buchmiller played a Rhodes piano on both this track and the following track, "Miro". The verses of the latter recalled 311 with its laidback guitar riff over a groove. Moore played piano on "Bitemarks and Bloodstains", which was the first track written for the record, bridging the group's sound between What It Is to Burn and Say Hello to Sunshine. "The Casket of Roderick Usher" was reminiscent of "Project Mayhem" from What It Is to Burn with its frantic energy, touching on grindcore, and drawing comparison to the Dillinger Escape Plan. The closing track "Dreams of Psilocybin" starts with loud noises and screaming sounds before the song kicks in.

== Release ==
On February 2, 2005, Allen was made an official member of the band. On February 16, it was revealed that the album would be titled Say Hello to Sunshine. On March 26, the band posted "Brother Bleed Brother" on their website. It was subsequently made available for download on April 14. On the same day, the album's track listing was revealed, followed by the album's artwork on April 18. For the remainder of April, the group went on tour with Vendetta Red and the Nurses, concluding with a performance at The Bamboozle festival. On April 29, "Ink" was posted online. In early May, the group appeared at Give it a Name festival and performed a few European shows with Motion City Soundtrack. From mid-May to early June, the group went on a headlining US tour with support from Vendetta Red, Walking Concert and Reeve Oliver. Say Hello to Sunshine was made available for streaming on May 6.

On May 17, "Bitemarks and Bloodstains" was released as a single. Two days later, a music video was released for the track, directed by Michael Palmieri. The concept for the video came from Allen. Linares said the video was about "the whole experience of the mass media and how they get these gullible people to live in fear." Say Hello to Sunshine was released on June 7 through Drive-Thru and Geffen Records. In late June and early July, the group went on a UK tour, supported by Million Dead. In late July and early August, the group went on a US tour with Head Automatica, Rx Bandits and Buck 65. On August 7, 2005, Head Automatica had to drop off the trek due to their frontman suffering from Crohn's disease. Following this, Finch appeared at the Summer Sonic Festival in Japan, before performing in the US with Rx Bandits and A Static Lullaby until early September. In October and November, the group supported HIM on their headlining US tour. On February 19, 2006, Finch announced an indefinite hiatus, explaining that their "priorities just lie in different places." They played the album in its entirety for its 10th anniversary for one show in 2015.

== Reception ==
Professional ratings
Review scores
Source	Rating
AbsolutePunk	6.7/10
AllMusic	3.5/5 stars
Drowned in Sound	8/10
IGN	2.9/10
Melodic	3/5 stars
Sputnikmusic	4/5

Say Hello to Sunshine charted at number 24 on the Billboard 200 after selling 38,000 copies in its first week. In the UK, the album reached number 48, while "Bitemarks and Bloodstains" reached number 82 in the singles chart. Spencer Charnas of Ice Nine Kills included the record on a list of albums that changed his life.

Say Hello to Sunshine received mixed reactions from music critics. AllMusic was appreciative that the band's "aggressive tendencies" remain at the forefront of the group's sound. They mentioned that with "such intriguing stylistic shifts permeating it", the release is "an outing whose rewards come via repeated listening." Chart Attack reviewer Shezhaad Jiwani said that instead of re-treading old ground, the band made a "bold step forward" with the release, without "sacrificing their signature intensity." He complimented Barcalow's "twice as strong" vocal performance, especially as he got "rid of that grating whine and replacing it with more versatile vocals." Sputnikmusic staff member Ryan Flatley found the record a "tumultuous journey filled with twists and turns for some, while [to] others it was an embrace on what they gave to our ears as listeners."

Raziq Rauf of Drowned in Sound said that while Barcalow's interest in "unsavoury" topics "tend[ed] to grate", he enjoyed the "new, more cultured approach to the execution" of Barcalow's lyricism. He described the album as a "superb and well-rounded effort" from a group that was attempting "to push its own boundaries, if nobody else's." Melodic reviewer Kaj Roth felt that the release was not as good as the band's first, "but then again it's not a disappointment either." He added that the tracks were up-tempo enough to "re-charge alkaline batteries for life, however the debut is a little better."

AbsolutePunk staff member Scott Weber expected to dislike the album, but said that he was "flat out wrong" and found it a "very solid, creative record that will silence a lot of critics, but also turn away some old fans." While noting that it was more "technical and innovative" than their past material, he felt that the album had "a bad tendency to fall into old habits at times. Finch ... got in the way of themselves." Ox-Fanzine reviewer Christian Meiners said that the release lacked "stadium rock character" in its alternative feel, and stated that he was "frightened by the extent of my dislike" for the album. JR of IGN bluntly referred to it as "one of the most criminally inaccessible albums in recent memory." As a Finch fan, he felt "alienated and hoodwinked" by this "poorly-constructed, terribly-written record." Chicago Tribune's Blair R. Fischer heavily criticised the album, saying that it "sounds like Finch just got its mitts on a bunch of Incubus B-sides and decided to ruin every one."

== Track listing ==
All songs written by Finch.

No.	Title	Producer	Length
1.	"Insomniatic Meat"	Jason Cupp; Ben Moore; Finch	4:24
2.	"Revelation Song"	Cupp; Moore; Finch	3:22
3.	"Brother Bleed Brother"	Cupp; Moore; Finch	3:41
4.	"A Piece of Mind"	Cupp; Finch	3:05
5.	"Ink"	Cupp; Moore; Finch	3:35
6.	"Fireflies"	Cupp; Moore; Finch	3:28
7.	"Hopeless Host"	Cupp; Moore; Finch	4:19
8.	"Reduced to Teeth"	Cupp; Moore; Finch	3:53
9.	"A Man Alone"	Cupp; Moore; Finch	4:16
10.	"Miro"	Cupp; Moore; Finch	3:13
11.	"Ravenous"	Cupp; Finch	2:39
12.	"Bitemarks and Bloodstains"	Cupp; Moore; Finch	4:39
13.	"The Casket of Roderick Usher"	Cupp; Finch	1:50
14.	"Dreams of Psilocybin"	Cupp; Moore; Finch	3:53

UK bonus track
No.	Title	Length
15.	"Gak 2"	5:39

Japanese edition bonus track
No.	Title	Length
15.	"Spanish Fly"	2:38

== Personnel ==
Personnel per booklet:

Finch

- Marc Allen – drums, percussion
- Nate Barcalow – vocals
- Randy Strohmeyer – guitar
- Derek Doherty – bass
- Alex Linares – guitar

Additional musicians

- Nick Buchmiller – Rhodes piano (tracks 9 and 10)
- Ben Moore – piano (track 12)
- Jason Cupp – shaker, tambourine, various percussion

Production

- Jason Cupp – producer (tracks 1–15), engineer, mixing (tracks 1–4, 6–9, 11 and 13–15)
- Ben Moore – producer (tracks 1–3, 5–10, 12, 14 and 15), additional engineering
- Finch – producer (tracks 1–15)
- Alan Mason – mixing assistant
- Rich Costey – mixing (tracks 5, 10 and 12)
- Claudius Mittendorpher – mixing assistant
- Eddie Schreyer – mastering
- Alex Pavlides – additional engineering
- Steve Russell – additional engineering
- JP Robinson – art direction, design
- Jeff Soto – illustration

== Chart positions ==
Chart (2005)	Peak position
Australian Albums (ARIA Charts)	83
UK Albums Chart	48
US Billboard 200	24
