= Samuel Johnson (disambiguation) =

Samuel Johnson (1709–1784) was an English literary figure and compiler of A Dictionary of the English Language; often referred to as "Dr. Johnson."

Samuel, Sammy or Sam Johnson may also refer to:

== Arts and letters ==
- Samuel Johnson (dramatist) (1691–1773), author of Hurlothrumbo
- Samuel Johnson (American educator) (1696–1772), American colonial intellectual and educator; first president of King's College (now Columbia University)
- Samuel Johnson (pamphleteer) (1649–1703), English political writer
- Samuel Johnson Jr. (1757–1836), American schoolteacher and lexicographer
- Samuel Johnson (Nigerian historian) (1846–1901), Anglican priest and historian of the Yoruba

== Business ==
- Samuel Curtis Johnson Sr. (1833–1919), American businessman
- Samuel Curtis Johnson Jr. (1928–2004), American businessman
- S. Curtis Johnson or Samuel Curtis Johnson, American businessman

== Politics ==
- Samuel Ealy Johnson Sr. (1838–1915), American businessman, rancher and presidential grandfather
- Samuel Johnson (Michigan politician) (1839–1916), member of the Michigan House of Representatives
- Samuel Ealy Johnson Jr. (1877–1937), Texas politician and presidential father
- Sam Johnson (Oregon politician) (1911–1984), Oregon businessman, legislator, and philanthropist
- Sam Houston Johnson (1914–1978), younger brother of U.S. President Lyndon B. Johnson
- Sam Johnson (1930–2020), Texas congressman
- I. Sam Johnson (1840–1906), American lawyer and politician from New York
- Samuel William Johnson (assemblyman) (1828–1895), American lawyer and politician from New York

== Sports ==
- Samuel Johnson (English footballer) (1881–unknown)
- Sam Johnson (footballer, born 1901) (1901–1975), English footballer
- Sammy Johnson (running back) (born 1952), American football player
- Sammy Johnson (defensive back) (born 1960), American football player
- Sam Johnson (defensive back), American player of Canadian football
- Sam Johnson (wide receiver) (born 1964), American football player
- Samuel Johnson (footballer, born 1973), Ghanaian footballer
- Samuel Johnson (footballer, born 1984), Guinean footballer
- Sam Johnson (footballer, born 1992), English goalkeeper
- Sammie Johnson (born 1992), Australian rules football player
- Sam Johnson (footballer, born 1993), Liberian footballer
- Sam Johnson (rugby union) (born 1993), Australian rugby union player

== Other people ==
- Sam Johnson (colonel), United States Air Force colonel and commander, 21st Space Wing
- Mingo Jack or Samuel Johnson (1820–1886), jockey, lynching victim from New Jersey
- Samuel Johnson (clergyman) (1822–1882), United States clergyman and author
- Samuel Johnson (New Zealand editor) (1827–1905), New Zealand printer, newspaper proprietor and editor
- Samuel William Johnson (chemist) (1830–1909), United States agricultural chemist
- Samuel Johnson (comedian) (1830–1900), British comedian
- Samuel Waite Johnson (1831–1912), English locomotive engineer
- Samuel D. Johnson Jr. (1920–2002), United States federal judge
- Sammy Johnson (1949–1998), English actor
- Samuel Johnson (actor) (born 1978), Australian actor, radio presenter, voiceover artist and philanthropist
- Sam Johnson (activist) (born 1989), organiser of the Student Volunteer Army
- Samuel Johnson (music producer) (fl. 2008–2010), Australian music producer and engineer
- Sam Johnson, American television producer and writer, part of the Sam Johnson and Chris Marcil writing team
- Samuel Johnson (soldier) (1845–1915), American Civil War soldier and Medal of Honor recipient
- Sam Johnson (Tennessee) (c. 1830 – after 1901), musician and carpenter formerly enslaved by U.S. President Andrew Johnson

== See also ==
- Samuel Johnson Prize
- Samuel Jackson (disambiguation)
- Samuel Johnston (disambiguation)
- Samantha Johnson (disambiguation)
