= List of Liberty ships (Samuel–Sy) =

This is a list of Liberty ships with names beginning with Samuel to Sy.

== Description ==
The standard Liberty ship (EC-2-S-C1 type) was a cargo ship 441 feet 6 inches (134.57 m) long overall, with a beam of 56 feet 10 3/4 inches (17.34 m). It had a depth of 37 feet 4 inches (11.38 m) and a draft of 26 feet 10 inches (8.18 m). It was powered by a triple expansion steam engine, which had cylinders of 24 1/2 inches (62 cm), 37 inches (94 cm) and 70 inches (180 cm) diameter by 48 inches (120 cm) stroke. The engine produced 2,500ihp at 76rpm. Driving a four-blade propeller 18 feet 6 inches (5.64 m) in diameter, could propel the ship at 11 knots (20 km/h).

Cargo was carried in five holds, numbered 1–5 from bow to stern. Grain capacity was 84,183 cubic feet (2,383.8 m^{3}), 145,604 cubic feet (4,123.0 m^{3}), 96,429 cubic feet (2,730.6 m^{3}), 93,190 cubic feet (2,639 m^{3}) and 93,190 cubic feet (2,639 m^{3}), with a further 49,086 cubic feet (1,390.0 m^{3}) in the deep tanks. Bale capacity was 75,405 cubic feet (2,135.2 m^{3}), 134,638 cubic feet (3,812.5 m^{3}), 83,697 cubic feet (2,370.0 m^{3}), 82,263 cubic feet (2,329.4 m^{3}) and 82,435 cubic feet (2,334.3 m^{3}), with a further 41,135 cubic feet (1,164.8 m^{3}) in the deep tanks.

It carried a crew of 45, plus 36 United States Navy Armed Guard gunners. Later in the war, this was altered to a crew of 52, plus 29 gunners. Accommodation was in a three deck superstructure placed midships. The galley was equipped with a range, a 25 US gallons (95 L) stock kettle and other appliances. Messrooms were equipped with an electric hot plate and an electric toaster.

== Samuel Adams ==
Samuel Adams was built by California Shipbuilding Corporation, Terminal Island, Los Angeles, California. Her keel was laid on 31 July 1941. She was launched on 31 January 1942 and delivered on 28 April. She was scrapped at New Orleans, Louisiana in November 1966.

== Samuel Ashe ==
Samuel Ashe was built by North Carolina Shipbuilding Company, Wilmington, North Carolina. Her keel was laid on 12 July 1942. She was launched on 17 September and delivered on 29 September. She was scrapped at Philadelphia, Pennsylvania in September 1970.

== Samuel A. Worcester ==
Samuel A. Worcester was built by Oregon Shipbuilding Corporation, Portland, Oregon. Her keel was laid on 25 May 1943. She was launched on 14 June and delivered on 22 June. To the Soviet Union under Lend-Lease and renamed Sovetskaya Gavan. Although reported scrapped in 1975 and deleted from the shipping registers in 1978, she arrived at Bombay, India under tow for scrapping in 1990.

== Samuel Blatchford ==
Samuel Blatchford was built by Bethlehem Fairfield Shipyard, Baltimore, Maryland.. Her keel was laid on 15 December 1942. She was launched on 6 February 1943 and delivered on 23 February. She was scrapped at Panama City, Florida in August 1971.

== Samuel Bowles ==
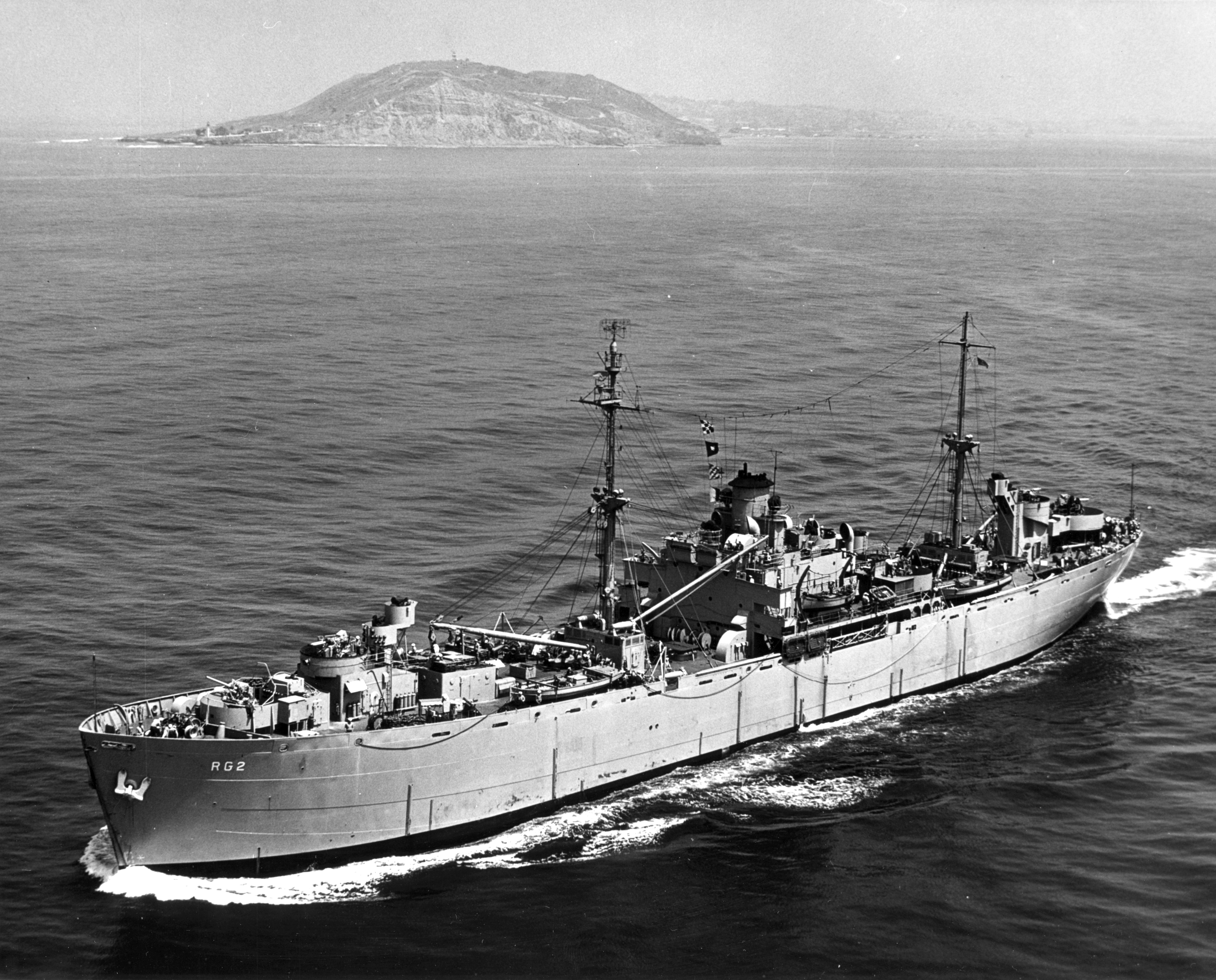
USS Luzon

Samuel Bowles was built by Bethlehem Fairfield Shipyard, Baltimore, Maryland. Her keel was laid on 8 April 1943. She was launched as Samuel Bowles on 14 May and delivered to the United States Navy as Luzon 24 May. Laid up in reserve at Orange, Texas in June 1947. Recommissioned in September 1950. Laid up in reserve at San Diego, California in April 1955. Recommissioned seven months later. Laid up in reserve in Suisun Bay in July 1960. She was sold to South Korean shipbreakers in August 1974.

== Samuel Brannon ==
Samuel Brannon was built by Permanente Metals Corporation, Richmond, California. Her keel was laid on 17 September 1943. She was launched on 9 October and delivered on 19 October. She was scrapped at Oakland, California in 1959.

== Samuel M. Ralston ==
Samuel M. Ralston was built by Bethlehem Fairfield Shipyard. Her keel was laid on 6 October 1943. She was launched as Samuel M. Ralston on 31 October and delivered as Samois on 8 November. To the Ministry of War Transport (MoWT) under Lend-Lease. Operated under the management of Westcott & Laurence Line. Sold in 1947 to Ellerman Lines Ltd. and renamed City of Lichfield. Operated under the management of Ellerman & Bucknall Steamship Co. Management transferred to Hall Line Ltd. in 1951. Sold in 1959 to Panamanian Oriental Steamship Corp. and renamed Camerona. Operated under the management of Wheelock, Marden & Co. Sold in 1961 to Eddie Steamship Co., Taipei and renamed Chee Lee. Reflagged to China. Sold in 1962 to Far Eastern Navigation Corp., Taipei, Taiwan. Reflagged to Taiwan in 1965. She was scrapped at Kaohsiung, Taiwan in 1967.

== Samuel Chase ==
Samuel Chase was built by Bethlehem Fairfield Shipyard. Her keel was laid on 12 September 1941. She was launched on 22 February 1942 and delivered on 11 April. She was scrapped at Philadelphia in February 1962.

== Samuel Colt ==
Samuel Colt was built by Oregon Shipbuilding Corporation. Her keel was laid on 23 September 1942. She was launched on 14 October and delivered on 2 November. She was scrapped at New Orleans in July 1969.

== Samuel de Champlain ==
Samuel de Champlain was built by Permanente Metals Corporation. Her keel was laid on 8 December 1942. She was launched on 10 January 1943 and delivered on 20 January. Built for the War Shipping Administration (WSA), she was operated under the management of United States Lines. To the French Government in 1946 and renamed La Rochelle. Operated under the management of Compagnie Delmas Vieljeux. Sold in 1967 to Jupiter Shipping Co. and renamed Jupiter. Reflagged to Cyprus. She was scrapped at Kaohsiung in March 1968.

== Samuel Dexter ==
Samuel Dexter was built by Delta Shipbuilding Company, New Orleans. Her keel was laid on 16 February 1943. She was launched on 29 March and delivered on 15 April. Built for the WSA. Operated under the management of Waterman Steamship Corporation. She developed cracks in her hull and deck and was abandoned in the Atlantic Ocean (56°19′N 11°43′W) on 24 January 1944 whilst on a voyage from Cardiff, United Kingdom to New York. She subsequently came ashore on Barra Island, United Kingdom and broke in two, a total loss.

== Samuel D. Ingham ==
Samuel D. Ingham was built by Oregon Shipbuilding Corporation. Her keel was laid on 19 December 1942. She was launched on 13 January 1943 and delivered on 22 January. She was scrapped at Philadelphia in 1962.

== Samuel F. B. Morse (I) ==
Samuel F. B. Morse was built by Permanente Metals Corporation. Her keel was laid on 18 August 1942. She was launched on 28 September and delivered on 9 October. She collided with the Norwegian tanker Vav and the British tanker British Statesman on 7 March 1943 whilst on a voyage from New York to Glasgow, United Kingdom in convoy. She was taken in to Rothesay Bay for temporary repairs, then to Glasgow, where she was repaired. She collided with the Liberty ship Henry Wilson on 25 July 1943 whilst on a voyage from Liverpool, United Kingdom to New York. She put in to Belfast, united Kingdom for repairs. To the United States Army in November 1943 and renamed James M. Huddlestone. Converted to a hospital ship. Converted to a troopship in December 1945. Returned to WSA in June 1946 and laid up in the James River. She was scrapped at La Spezia, Italy in January 1971.

== Samuel F. B Morse (II) ==
Samuel F. B. Morse was built by Bethlehem Fairfield Shipyard. Her keel was laid on 25 April 1944. She was launched on 24 May and delivered on 4 June. Built for the WSA, she was operated under the management of Marine Transport Lines. Management transferred to Marine Operating Co. in 1946. Sold in 1947 to Calmar Steamship Corp. and renamed Alamar. Sold in 1955 to Bethelehem Steel Corp. Operated under the management of her previous owner. Laid up at Baltimore in 1965. Returned to the United States Government in 1968. She arrived at Santander, Spain under tow for scrapping in December 1968.

== Samuel F. Mille ==
Samuel F. Miller was built by Permanente Metals Corporation. Her keel was laid on 26 September 1942. She was launched on 31 October and delivered on 14 November. She was scrapped at Portland, Oregon in November 1966.

== Samuel G. French ==
Samuel G. French was built by J. A. Jones Construction Company, Panama City, Florida. Her keel was laid on 31 January 1944. She was launched on 21 March and delivered on 22 April. Built for the WSA, she was operated under the management of Samuel J. Olsen & Co. To the Dutch Government in 1947 and renamed Egmond. Renamed Alcyone later that year and placed under the management of Van Nievelt, Goudriaan Stoomboots Maatschappij. Sold to her managers in 1950. Sold in 1958 to Tricontinental Steamship Corp. and renamed Nicos S. Reflagged to Liberia and operated under the management of Goulandris Ltd. Management transferred to Syros Shipping Co. in 1963. Reflagged to Greece in 1966. She was scrapped at Castellón de la Plana, Spain in May 1971.

== Samuel G. Howe ==
Samuel G. Howe was built by J. A. Jones Construction Company, Panama City. Her keel was laid on 7 September 1944. She was launched on 17 October and delivered on 30 October. She was scrapped at Panama City, Florida in April 1970.

== Samuel Gompers (I) ==
Samuel Gompers was built by California Shipbuilding Corporation. Her keel was laid on 29 July 1942. She was launched on 7 September and delivered on 22 September. Built for the WSA, she was operated under the management of Weyerhaeuser Steamship Co. She was torpedoed and sunk by I-10 off the coast of New Caledonia (24°21′S 166°12′E) on 29 January 1943 whilst on a voyage from Nouméa, New Caledonia to Newcastle, Australia.

== Samuel Gompers (II) ==
Samuel Gompers was built by Permanente Metals Corporation. Her keel was laid on 9 June 1944. She was launched on 28 June and delivered on 10 July. She was scrapped at Baltimore in June 1960.

== Samuel Gorton ==
Samuel Gorton was built by Walsh-Kaiser Company, Providence, Rhode Island. Her keel was laid on 28 July 1942. She was launched on 6 April 1943 and delivered on 6 May. She was scrapped at Kearny, New Jersey in March 1968.

== Samuel Griffin ==
Samuel Griffin was built by Todd Houston Shipbuilding Corporation, Houston, Texas. Her keel was laid on 18 May 1942. She was launched on 2 August and delivered on 26 August. Built for the WSA, she was operated under the management of Seas Shipping Co. She was scrapped at Baltimore in November 1961.

== Samuel Heintzelman ==
Samuel Heintzelman was built by California Shipbuilding Corporation. Her keel was laid on 27 August 1942. She was launched on 30 September and delivered on 20 October. Built for the WSA, she was operated under the management of Coastwise Steamship Co. She was torpedoed and sunk in the Indian Ocean (9°00′S 81°00′E) by U-511 on 9 July 1943 whilst on a voyage from Charleston, South Carolina to Karachi, India.

== Samuel Huntington ==
Samuel Huntington was built by Permanente Metals Corporation. Her keel was laid on 20 January 1942. She was launched on 26 April and delivered on 18 May. Built for the WSA, she was operated under the management of Oliver J. Olsen & Co. She was bombed, caught fire, exploded and sank off Anzio, Italy on 29 January 1944 whilst on a voyage from Naples to Anzio, Italy. Her wreck was sold to Genoa shipbreakers in 1948.

== Samuel H. Walker ==
Samuel H. Walker was built by Todd Houston Shipbuilding Corporation. Her keel was laid on 16 July 1943. She was launched on 31 August and delivered on 16 September. She was scrapped at Kearny in October 1964.

== Samuel Johnston ==
Samuel Johnston was built by Bethlehem Fairfield Shipyard. Her keel was laid on 14 April 1942. She was launched on 14 June and delivered on 30 June. She was scrapped at Green Cove Springs, Florida in February 1968.

== Samuel Jordan Kirkwood ==
Samue Jordan Kirkwood was built by Delta Shipbuilding Company. Her keel was laid on 15 October 1942. She was launched on 3 December and delivered on 18 December. Built for the WSA, she was operated under the management of A. H. Bull & Co. She was torpedoed and sunk in the Atlantic Ocean 125 nautical miles (232 km) off Ascension Island (15°00′S 7°00′W) by U-195 on 7 May 1943 whilst on a voyage from Suez to a Brazilian port.

== Samuel J. Tilden ==
Samuel J. Tilden was built by Oregon Shipbuilding Corporation. Her keel was laid on 23 October 1942. She was launched on 18 November and delivered on 28 November. Built for the WSA, she was operated under the management of A. H. Bull & Co. She was sunk in an air raid on Bari, Italy on 2 December 1943. Her wreck was scrapped by Genoa shipbreakers in 1948.

== Samuel K. Barlow ==
Samuel K. Barlow was built by Oregon Shipbuilding Corporation. Her keel was laid on 19 June 1943. She was launched on 9 July and delivered on 16 July. She was scrapped at Everett, Washington in April 1961.

== Samuel Lancaster ==
Samuel Lancaster was built by Oregon Shipbuilding Corporation. Her keel was laid on 14 July 1943. She was launched on 3 August and delivered on 10 August. She was scrapped at Oakland in November 1964.

== Samuel L. Cobb ==
Samuel L. Cobb was built by Permanente Metals Corporation. Her keel was laid on 6 May 1944. She was launched on 27 May and delivered on 3 June. Built for the WSA, she was operated under the management of Olympic Steamship Company. Management transferred to American Pacific Steamship Co. in 1946. Later that year, management was transferred to States Marine Corporation, New York. She was sold to them before the years' end and renamed Volunteer Staff. Sold in 1955 to Alaska Steamship Co. and renamed Fortuna. She developed cracks in her deck plating on 19 April 1971 whilst on a voyage from Seattle to Kodiak, Alaska. She put back to Seattle. Declared a constructive total loss, she was scrapped at Kaohsiung in December 1971.

== Samuel Livermore ==
Samuel Livermore was built by Todd Houston Shipbuilding Corporation. Her keel was laid on 27 July 1942. She was launched on 22 September and delivered on 20 October. She was scrapped at Jersey City, New Jersey in December 1959.

== Samuel L. Jeffery ==
Samuel L. Jeffery was built by Todd Houston Shipbuilding Corporation. Her keel was laid on 11 January 1945. She was launched on 13 February and delivered on 24 February. She was damaged in 1945 and laid up at Mobile. Declared a constructive total loss, she was scrapped at Port Arthur, Texas in 1947.

== Samuel McIntyre ==
Samuel McIntyre was built by Bethlehem Fairfield Shipyard. Her keel was laid on 15 May 1943. She was launched on 18 June and delivered on 29 June. She was scrapped at Kearny in 1966.

== Samuel Moody ==
Samuel Moody was built by Oregon Shipbuilding Corporation. Her keel was laid on 12 March 1942. She was launched on 27 April and delivered on 22 May. She was scrapped at Richmond in May 1964.

== Samuel Nelson ==
Samuel Nelson was built by California Shipbuilding Corporation. Her keel was laid on 27 September 1942. She was launched on 30 October and delivered on 17 November. She was scrapped at Kearny in 1964.

== Samuel Parker ==
Samuel Parker was built by Oregon Shipbuilding Corporation. Her keel was laid on 14 October 1942. She was launched on 7 November and delivered on 17 November. Built for the WSA, she was operated under the management of American Mail Lines. She was scrapped at Green Cove Springs in 1968.

== Samuel P. Langley ==
Samuel P. Langley was built by California Shipbuilding Corporation. Her keel was laid on 28 December 1942. She was launched on as Samuel P. Langley 24 January 1943 and delivered as Voikov on 9 February. To the Soviet Union under Lend-Lease. She collided with the West German ship Bungsberg in the Kiel Canal on 1 January 1955. Bungsberg was severely damaged. Converted to a non-propelled workshop in 1974. She was deleted from Lloyd's Register in 1977.

== Samuel R. Aitken ==
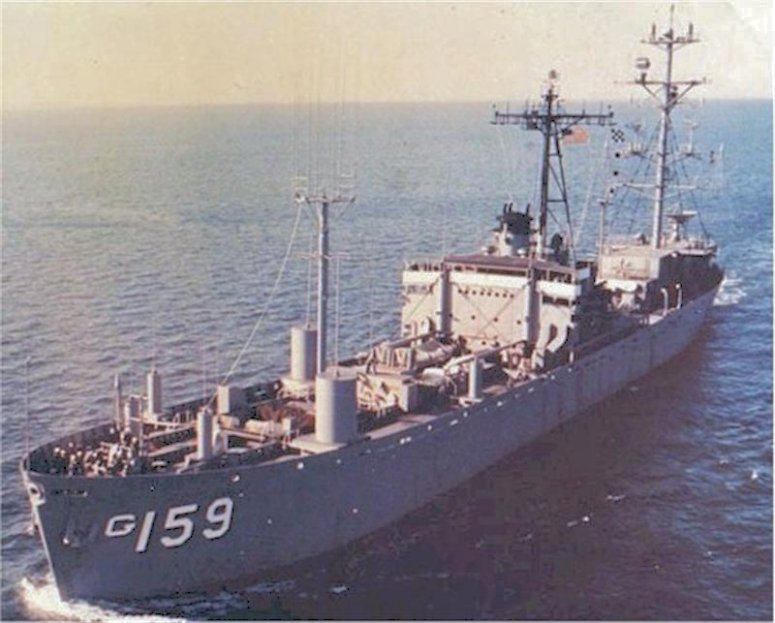
USS Oxford

Samuel R. Aitken was a boxed aircraft transport built by New England Shipbuilding Corporation. Her keel was laid on 23 May 1945. She was launched on 31 July and delivered on 31 August. She was laid up at Wilmington, North Carolina in April 1948. To the United States Navy in September 1960 and renamed Oxford. Converted for naval use at New York Naval Shipyard, Brooklyn, New York. She was stricken from the Navy List in December 1969 and scrapped at Kaohsiung in May 1970.

== Samuel Seabury ==
Samuel Seabury was built by Oregon Shipbuilding Corporation. Her keel was laid on 17 August 1942. She was launched on 17 September and delivered on 30 September. She was scrapped at Portland, Oregon in 1961.

== Samuel T. Darling ==
Samuel T. Darling was built by Southeastern Shipbuilding Corporation, Savannah, Georgia. Her keel was laid on 26 November 1943. She was launched on 18 January 1944 and delivered on 31 January. She was scrapped at Seattle, Washington in February 1961.

== Samuel V. Stewart ==
Samuel V. Stewart was built by Oregon Shipbuilding Corporation. Her keel was laid on 20 December 1943. She was launched on 7 January 1944 and delivered on 18 January. Built for the WSA, she was operated under the management of American South African Line. To the Dutch Government in 1947 and renamed Sweelinck. Renamed Aludra later that year and placed under the management of Van Nievelt, Goudriaan Stoomboots Maatschappij, Rotterdam. Sold to her managers in 1950. Sold in 1959 to Marina Compania Maritima and renamed Maria. Reflagged to Greece and operated under the management of Trans-Ocean Steamship Agency. She was lengthened at Maizuru, Japan in 1961. Now 511 feet 6 inches (155.91 m) long and 8,685 GRT. She ran aground off Maizuru on 25 December 1961 and was abandoned as a constructive total loss. She was scrapped in Japan in May 1962.

== Samuel W. Williston ==
Samuel W. Williston was built by Permanente Metals Corporation. Her keel was laid on 17 September 1943. She was launched on 6 October and delivered on 15 October. Built for the WSA, she was operated under the management of Agwilines Inc. Sold in 1947 to Atlantic Maritime Co. and renamed Atlantic Seaman. Reflagged to Panama and operated under the management of Boyd, Weir & Sewell. Management transferred to S. Livanos & Co. in 1948, the Maritime Brokers in 1952. Sold in 1953 to Atlantic Freighters Ltd. Reflagged to Liberia and operated under the management of S. Livanos Ltd. Sold in 1960 to United White Shipping Co. Reflagged to Panama, remaining under the same management. She was scrapped at Kaohsiung in March 1967.

== Samur ==
Samur was built by Bethlehem Fairfield Shipyard. Her keel was laid on 29 July 1943. She was launched as Charles C. Long on 24 August and delivered as Samur on 1 September. To the MoWT under Lend-Lease. Operated under the management ofLamport & Holt Line. To the United States Maritime Commission (USMC) in 1948, officially renamed Charles C. Long. Laid up at Beaumont bearing name Samur. She was scrapped at New Orleans in March 1966.

== Samuta ==
Samuta was built by Bethlehem Fairfield Shipyard. Her keel was laid on 11 September 1943. She was launched as Jesse De Forest on 3 October and delivered as Samuta on 12 October. To the MoWT under Lend-Lease. Operated under the management of Andrew Weir & Co. Sold in 1947 to Bank Line Ltd. and renamed Kelvinbank, remaining under the same management. She ran aground on a reef off Ocean Island, Gilbert Islands on 6 January 1953 whilst on a voyage from Ocean Island to an Australian port. She was refloated but was holed by the wreck of Ooma and became a total loss.

== Samvannah ==
Samvannah was built by Southeastern Shipbuilding Corporation. Her keel was laid on 12 November 1943. She was launched as Louis A. Godey on 20 December and delivered as Samvannah on 30 December. To the MoWT, operated under the management of Anchor Line Ltd. Returned to the USMC in 1948, officially renamed Louis A. Godey. Laid up at Beaumont bearing name Samvannah. She was scrapped at Orange in 1961.

== Samvard ==
Samvard was built by Bethlehem Fairfield Shipyard. Her keel was laid on 12 November 1943. She was launched as Ammla on 3 December and delivered on 13 December. She was completed as Samvard. To the MoWT under Lend-Lease. Operated under the management of William Thompson & Co. Renamed Ammla in 1944. Sold in 1947 to Ben Line and renamed Benarty, remaining under the same management. Sold in 1954 to Isla Grande Compania Navigation, Panama and renamed Creator. Reflagged to Liberia and placed under the management of D. Prateras Ltd. Renamed Treis Ierarcha in 1960 and reflagged to Greece. Sold in 1963 to Darien Compania Navigation, Panama and renamed Captain G., remaining under the Greek flag. Sold to shipbreakers in Shanghai, China in 1968. Foundered in a typhoon 60 nautical miles (110 km) south of Hong Kong (approximately 22°24′N 114°55′E) on 21 August whilst on a voyage from Kosseir to Shanghai.

== Samvern ==
Samvern was built by Bethlehem Fairfield Shipyard. Her keel was laid on 26 September 1943. She was launched as Edith Wharton on 17 October and delivered as Samvern on 28 October. To the MoWT under Lend-Lease. Operated under the management of William Thomson & Co. She struck a mine and sank in the Scheldt (51°22′N 3°02′E) on 18 January 1945. Her wreck was dispersed in December 1963.

== Samvigna ==
Samvigna was built by J. A. Jones Construction Company, Brunswick. Her keel was laid on 22 February 1944. She was launched on 8 April and delivered on 20 April. To the MoWT under Lend-Lease. Operated under the management of Hain Steamship Co. Returned to the USMC in 1948 and laid up at Mobile. She was scrapped there in May 1960.

== Samwake ==
Samwake was built by New England Shipbuilding Corporation. Her keel was laid on 8 March 1944. She was launched on 19 April and delivered on 28 April. To the MoWT under Lend-Lease. Operated under the management of Stanley & John Thompson Ltd. She was torpedoed and sunk in the English Channel (approximately 50°40′N 0°31′E) by an E-boat on 30 August 1944 whilst on a voyage from Normandy to the River Thames.

== Samwharfe ==
Samwharfe was built by California Shipbuilding Corporation. Her keel was laid on 5 August 1943. She was launched as Dwight B. Heard on 28 August and delivered as Sambur on 14 September. To MoWT under Lend-Lease, operated under the management of Ellerman's Wilson Line. Renamed Samwharfe in 1944. To USMC on 1947 and renamed Dwight B. Heard. Laid up in the James River post-war. She was scrapped at Philadelphia in 1960.

== Samwash ==
Samwash was built by Permanente Metals Corporation. Her keel was laid on 13 August 1943. She was launched as Harmon Judson on 4 September and delivered as Samwash on 13 September. To the MoWT under Lend-Lease. Operated under the management of Andrew Weir & Co. Sold in 1947 to The Bank Line and renamed Maplebank, remaining under the same management. Sold in 1957 to West African Navigation Co. and renamed African Lord. Reflagged to Liberia and operated under the management of T. J. Verrando & Co. Management transferred to T. J. Transamerican Steamship Corp. in 1966. She was scrapped at Kaohsiung in April 1969.

== Samwater ==
Samwater was built by Bethlehem Fairfield Shipyard. Her keel was laid on 12 July 1943. She was launched as David De Vries on 9 August and delivered as Samwater on 16 August. To the MoWT under Lend-Lease. Operated under the management of Glen Line Ltd. She caught fire 35 nautical miles (65 km) west of Cape Finisterre, Spain on 29 January 1942 whilst on a voyage from Sydney, Australia to Liverpool. She was abandoned by her crew and sank in the Atlantic Ocean. (42°41′N 10°13′W).

== Samwinged ==
Samwinged was built by Bethlehem Fairfield Shipyard. Her keel was laid on 22 March 1944. She was launched on 22 April and delivered on 30 April. To the MoWT under Lend-Lease. Operated under the management of Sir William Reardon Smith & Sons. Returned to the USMC in 1948 and laid up at Mobile. She was scrapped at Panama City, Florida in August 1970.

== Samwis ==
Samwis was built by Bethlehem Fairfield Shipyard. Her keel was laid on 15 September 1943. She was launched as Edward Cook on 8 October and delivered as Samwis on 15 October. To the MoWT under Lend-Lease. Operated under the management of T. & J. Harrison. Sold in 1947 to Charente Steamship Co., Liverpool and renamed Specialist. Sold in 1964 to Atlantic Maritime Carriers, Panama and renamed Mitera. Reflagged to Liberia and placed under the management of Hadjipateras Bros. Reflagged to Greece in 1966. She was scrapped at Hong Kong in November 1968.

== Samwye ==
Samwye was built by New England Shipbuilding Corporation. Her keel was laid on 10 January 1944. She was launched on 26 February and delivered on 8 March. To the MoWT under Lend-Lease. Operated under the management of Andrew Weir & Co. Sold in 1947 to Bank Line and renamed Willowbank. Sold in 1956 to Puerto Barrios Compania Navigation, Panama and renamed Cavala. Reflagged to Liberia and operated under the joint management of Papachristidis Co. and Nomikos Ltd. Sold in 1957 to Transatlantic Carriers Corp. and renamed Transkipper. Operated under the management of Pan Atlantic Development Corp. Sold in 1962 to Consolidated Navigation Corp. and renamed Constructor. Operated under the management of Expedo & Co. Sold in 1964 to Evangelistra Shipping Corp. and renamed Kimon. Operated under the management of Palmco Shipping Corp. She ran aground on the North Reef, Malindi, Kenya (3°16′S 40°10′E) on 2 August 1967 whilst on a voyage from Bombay to Durban, South Africa. She was refloated on 6 October and towed in to Mombasa, Kenya. Declared a constructive total loss, she was towed to Hong Kong in May 1969 and scrapped.

== Samwyo ==
Samwyo was built by Bethlehem Fairfield Shipyard. Her keel was laid on 30 August 1943. She was launched as Adolph S. Ochs on 23 September and delivered as Samwyo on 2 October. To the MoWT under Lend-Lease. Operated under the management of Cayzer, Irvine & Co., London. Renamed Adolph S. Ochs later that year. Management transferred to G. Nisbet & Co. in 1946. Returned to America in 1948 and laid up at Wilmington, Delaware. She was scrapped at Kearny in December 1968.

== Samyale ==
Samyale was built by Bethlehem Fairfield Shipyard. Her keel was laid on 15 November 1943. She was launched as Hugh L. Kerwin on 7 December and delivered as Samyale on 17 December. To the MoWT under Lend-Lease. Operated under the management of Booth Steamship Co. Sold in 1947 to Elder Dempster Lines Ltd., Liverpool and renamed Zungon. Sold in 1958 to Society Pacifica Maritima, Panama and renamed Aegina. Reflagged to Liberia and operated under the management of Goulandris Ltd. Sold in 1959 to August Shipping Corp. Operated under the management of Suwannee Steamship Corp. Sold in 1966 to Marancho Compania Navigation, Panama and renamed Irini. Reflagged to Greece and operated under the management of Carapanayoti & Co. Collided with the Liberian tanker Russell H. Green 10 nautical miles (19 km) north of Cape Spartel, Morocco on 10 June 1967 whilst on a voyage from Gdynia. Polan to a Mediterranean port. She put in to Cádiz, Spain in a severely damaged condition. She was towed to Valencia, Spain on 6 December. She was subsequently scrapped.

== Samyork ==
Samyork was built by Bethlehem Fairfield Shipyard. Her keel was laid on 27 September 1943. She was launched as W. Walter Husband on 19 October and delivered as Samyork on 29 October. To the MoWT under Lend-Lease. Operated under the management of Andrew Weir & Co. Sold in 1947 to Bank Line and renamed Ivybank, remaining under the same management. Sold in 1959 to Panamanian Oriental Steamship Corp. and renamed Winona. Reflagged to Panama and operated under the management of Wheelock, Marden & Co. Renamed Kondor in 1961. Sold in 1963 to Grand Steamship Co. and renamed Grand. Reflagged to China. She sprang a leak, broke in two and sank in the Pacific Ocean (34°15′N 145°10′E) on 13 January 1965 whilst on a voyage from San Francisco, California to Kaohsiung.

== Samythian ==
Samythian was built by New England Shipbuilding Corporation. Her keel was laid on 24 November 1943. She was launched on 13 January 1944 and delivered on 21 January. To the MoWT under Lend-Lease. Operated under the management of Kaye, Son & Co. Returned to the USMC in 1947 and laid up at Mobile. She was scrapped at Panama City, Florida in November 1961.

== Samzona ==
Samzona was built by Oregon Shipbuilding Corporation. Her keel was laid on 27 August 1943. She was launched as Victor C. Vaughan on 12 September and delivered as Samzona on 19 September. To the MoWT under Lend-Lease. Operated under the management of Royal Mail Lines. Returned to the USMC in 1948 and renamed Victor C. Vaughan. Laid up at Mobile. She was scrapped at Orange in 1961.

== Sanford B. Dole ==
Sanford B. Dole was a tanker built by California Shipbuilding Corporation. She was completed in December 1943. To the United States Navy and renamed Giraffe. Returned to the WSA in June 1946 and renamed Sanford B. Dole. Sold in 1948 to Fordham Trading Corp., New York. Sold later that year to Metro Petroleum Shipping Co., Dover, Delaware. Rebuilt as a cargo ship at Newport News in 1949. Now 7,211 GRT. Renamed Eileen in 1950. Sold in 1951 to Sea Transport Corp. and renamed Seafender. Operated under the management of Orion Shipping & Trading Co. Sold in 1953 to Naess Mejlander & Co. and renamed Ragna Ness. Sold in 1955 to Norlo Shipping Co. Inc. and renamed Ocean Daphne. Reflagged to Liberia and operated under the management of Orion Shipping & Trading Co. Sold in 1958 to Ocean Liberties Inc. and placed under the management of Maritime Overseas Corp. Sold in 1960 to Cosmos Compania Navigation, Panama and renamed Orient Lakes. Remaining under the Liberian flag and operated under the management of Orient Mid-East Ltd. Sold in 1961 to Peggy Navigation Co., Panama and renamed Sancy. Remaining under the Liberian flag and operated under the management of Wallem & Co. She was scrapped at Hirao, Japan in December 1967.

== Santiago Iglesias ==
Santiago Iglesias was built by Bethlehem Fairfield Shipyard. Her keel was laid on 21 February 1943. She was launched on 30 March and delivered on 10 April. Laid up post-war, she was transferred to the United States Navy in 1965. She was scuttled off the coast of New Jersey with a cargo of obsolete ammunition on 19 June 1965.

== Sara Bache ==
Sara Bache was built by Pearmanente Metals Corporation. Her keel was laid on 24 January 1944. She was launched on 12 February and delivered on 19 February. She was scrapped at Portland, Oregon in April 1961.

== Sarah J. Hale ==
Sarah J. Hale was a tank transport built by J. A. Jones Construction Co., Panama City. Her keel was laid on 29 September 1943. She was launched on 24 November and delivered on 31 December. Laid up in the James River post-war, she was scrapped at Valencia, Spain in November 1972.

== Sarah Orne Jewett ==
Sarah Orne Jewett was built by New England Shipbuilding Corporation. Her keel was laid on 8 December 1943. She was launched on 28 January 1944 and delivered on 17 February. Built for the WSA, she was operated under the management of Prudential Steamship Corporation, New York. Sold to her managers in 1948. Sold in 1951 to Dolphin Steamship Corp., New York and renamed Nikos. Sold in 1953 to National Shipping & Trading Corp., New York and renamed John Paul Jones. Sold in 1954 to American Waterways Corp. and renamed National Liberty. Operated under the management of National Shipping & Trading Co. Sold in 1959 to Mount Evans Steamship Co. and renamed Mount Evans. Operated under the management of Cargo & Tankship Management Corp. Management transferred to A. H. Bull & Co. in 1962. Sold in 1963 to Midwest Shipping & Trading Corp. and renamed Wyoming. Operated under the management of Martran Steamship Co. Sold later that year to Panolas Compania Maritime, Panama and renamed Yucatan. Reflagged to Liberia and operated under the management of C. M. Los Ltd. Sold in 1965 to Eastern Marine Corp. and renamed Eastern Argo. Operated under the management of United Maritime Trust. She ran aground off Mapingil, Philippines on 20 November 1966. She was refloated and towed in to Jose Panganiban. Subsequently towed to Kaohsiung. She arrived at Keelung, Taiwanon 7 February 1967 and was laid up. She was scrapped there in July 1967.

== Sara Teasdale ==
Sara Teasdale was built by Permanente Metals Corporation. Her keel was laid on 12 October 1943. She was launched on 30 October and delivered on 7 November. Built for the WSA, she was operated under the management of American President Lines. To the French Government in 1946. Operated under the management of Union Industrielle & Maritime Sociètė Française d'Armamente, Paris. Renamed Oradour in 1947. Sold in 1959 to Lesteri Corp. and renamed Leotric. Reflagged to Liberia and operated under the management of Wigham, Richardson & Co. Sold in 1960 to Marina Compania Navigation, Panama and renamed Hera. Reflagged to Greece and operated under the management of Dracoulis Ltd. Sold in 1962 to Gumps Marine Financing Ltd. and renamed California Sun. Reflagged to Liberia and operated under the management of Pacific Steamship Agency. Sold in 1964 to Adrian Maritime Co. and renamed Zaneta. Operated under the management of Astoria Steamship Agency. She sprang a leak and sank in the Arabian Sea (17°56′N 58°20′E) on 19 June 1966 whilst on a voyage from Mormugao, India to Trieste, Italy.

== Schuyler Colfax ==
Schuyler Colfax was a tanker built by California Shipbuilding Corporation. She was completed in November 1943. She ran aground in Hawaiian waters on 16 August 1946 and was damaged. She was refloated and laid up at Honolulu, Hawaii. She was transferred to the United States Navy in August 1947. Subsequently, sunk as a target ship by United States Navy aircraft and USS Sailfish.

== Seaman A. Knapp ==
Seaman A. Knapp was built by Pearmanente Metals Corporation. Her keel was laid on 5 November 1943. She was launched on 24 November and delivered on 30 November. Laid up in the James River post-war, she was scrapped at Philadelphia in August 1972.

== Sebastian Cermeno ==
Sebastian Cermeno was built by Marinship Corporation, Sausalito, California. Her keel was laid on 7 December 1942. She was launched on 6 February 1943 and delivered on 10 March. She was torpedoed and sunk in the Indian Ocean (28°50′S 50°20′E) by U-511 on 27 June 1943 whilst on a voyage from Suez, Egypt to Bahia, Brazil.

== Sebastian Vizcaino ==
Sebastian Vizcaino was built by California Shipbuilding Corporation. Her keel was laid on 7 November 1942. She was launched on 7 December and delivered on 23 December. She was scrapped at Everett, Washington in March 1961.

== Seginus ==
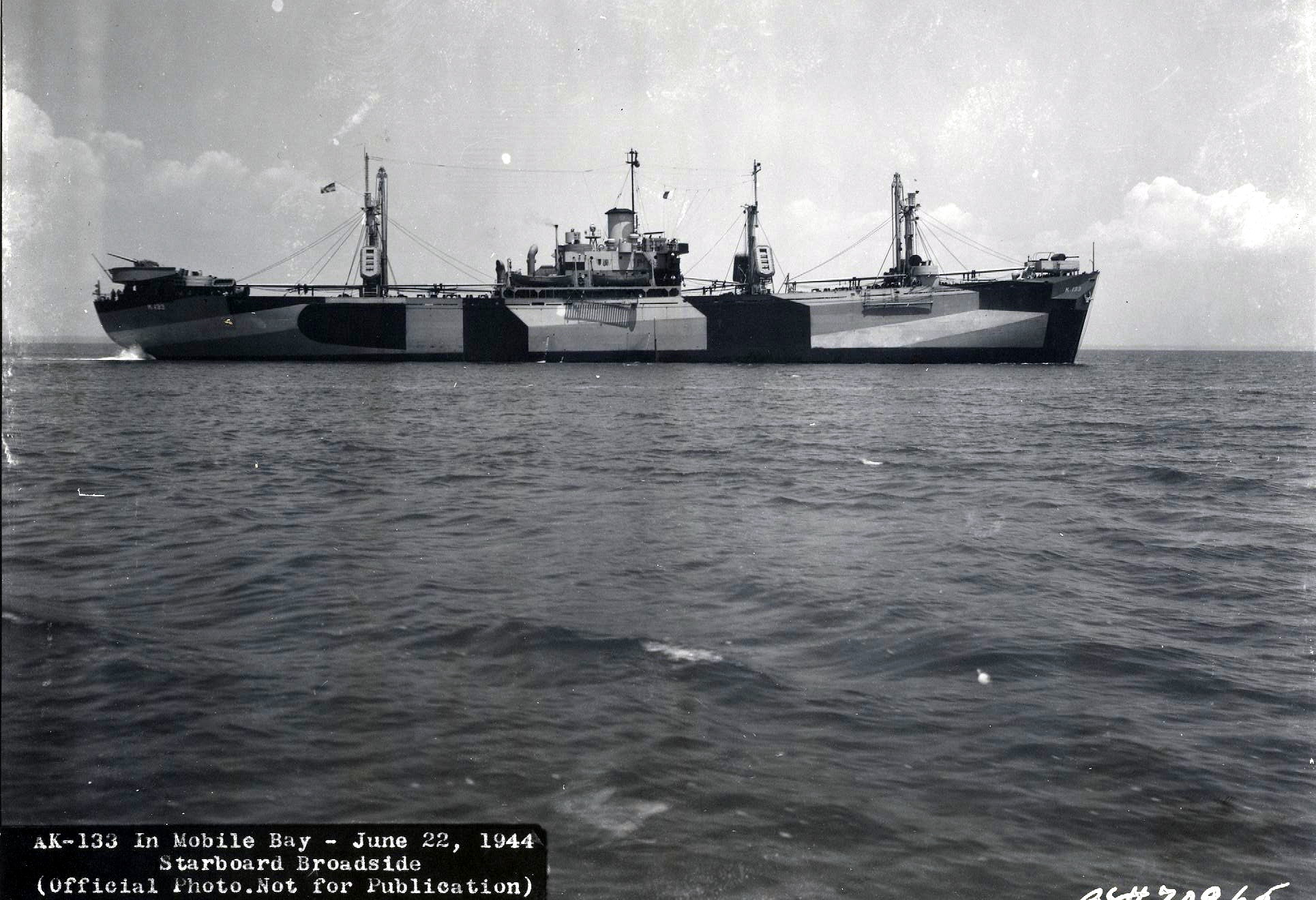
USS Seginus

Seginus was built by Delta Shipbuilding Company. Her keel was laid on 10 January 1944. She was launched as Harry Toulmin on 4 March and delivered to the United States Navy as Seginus on 12 April. Converted for naval use at the Waterman Steamship Company's yard at Mobile. To WSA in November 1945 and renamed Harry Toulmin. Laid up in reserve at Suisun Bay. Sold in 1947 to Thomas N. Epiphaniades Steamship Co. Piraeus and renamed Kehrea. She was scrapped at Shanghai in October 1967.

== Segundo Ruiz Belvis ==
Segundo Ruiz Belvis was built by Oregon Shipbuilding Corporation. Her keel was laid on 30 October 1943. She was launched on 19 November and delivered on 1 December. Built for the WSA, she was operated under the management of Shephard Steamship Co. Sold in 1947 to Southerns Steamships Ltd., Johannesburg, Union of South Africa and renamed President Reitz. She came ashore 5 nautical miles (9.3 km) east of the mouth of the Zitzihamma River on 27 November 1947 whilst on a voyage from Table Bay to Durban. Declared a constructive total loss, she was sold and stripped.

== Serpens ==
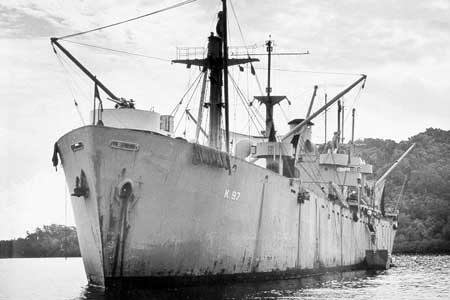
USS Serpens

Serpens was built by California Shipbuilding Corporation. Her keel was laid on 10 March 1943. She was launched on 5 April and delivered to the United States Navy as Serpens on 19 April. Converted to an ammunition stowage ship at Wellington, New Zealand in late 1944. On 29 January 1945, she exploded off Guadalcanal, Solomon Islands whilst depth charges were being loaded and was obliterated.

== Sewanee Seam ==
Sewanee Seam was a collier built by Delta Shipbuilding Company. Her keel was laid on 19 December 1944. She was launched on 28 February 1945 and delivered on 27 April. Built for the WSA, she was operated under the management of Eastern Gas & Fuel Associates, Boston, Massachusetts. Sold to her managers in 1946. Sold in 1947 to Mystic Steamship Division and renamed Newton. Operated under the management of her previous owners. Sold in 1961 to Massachusetts Trustees of Eastern Gas & Fuel Association, Boston. Converted to a non-propelled barge in 1963 and renamed Eastern 2. She broke from her tow and came ashore near the mouth of the Shark River 12 nautical miles (22 km) from Sandy Hook, New Jersey on 25 December 1969 and broke in two.

== Sewell Seam ==
Sewell Seam was a collier built by Delta Shipbuilding Company. Her keel was laid on 23 February 1945. She was launched on 21 April and delivered on 16 June. Built for the WSA, she was operated under the management of Willmore Steamship Co. Sold in 1946 to Eastern Gas & Fuel Association. Sold in 1947 to Mystic Steamship Division and renamed Concord. Operated under the management of her former owners. Sold in 1961 to Massachusetts Trustees of Eastern Gas & Fuel Association. Converted to a non-propelled barge in 1963 and renamed Eastern 4.

== S. Hall Young ==
S. Hall Young was built by Permanente Metals Corporation. Her keel was laid on 2 March 1943. She was launched on 31 March and delivered on 12 April. Built for the WSA, she was operated under the management of American-Hawaiian Steamship Company. To the Dutch Government in 1947 and renamed Bredero. Sold later that year to Vereenigde Nederlandsche Scheepvaarts Maatschappij (VNSM), Den Haag and renamed Lekkerkerk. Sold in 1950 to Nederlandsche N.V. Stoomvaarts Maatschappij. Sold in 1951 to VNSM. Sold in 1961 to Compania de Navigation Michaels Line, Panama & Athens and renamed Maria Santa. Reflagged to Greece. Sold in 1966 to Mardiestra Compania Navigation, Panama. Remaining under the Greek flag and operated under the management of P. Papadelis. She was scrapped at Kaohsiung in June 1967.

== Sheldon Jackson ==
Sheldon Jackson was built by Permanente Metals Corporation. Her keel was laid on 9 March 1943. She was launched on 7 April and delivered on 18 April. She was scrapped at Richmond in 1966.

== Sherman O. Houghton ==
Sherman O. Houghton was built by California Shipbuilding Corporation. Her keel was laid on 7 January 1944. She was launched on 4 February and delivered on 21 February. Laid up in the James River post-war, she was scrapped at Kearny in August 1972.

== Sherwood Anderson ==
Sherwood Anderson was built by California Shipbuilding Corporation. Her keel was laid on 12 November 1943. She was launched on 10 December and delivered on 28 December. Built for the WSA, she was operated under the management of Moore-McCormack Lines. Management transferred to Overlakes Freight Corp. in 1946. To the French Government later that year. Operated under the management of Fabre Line. Renamed Marseille in 1947. Sold in 1960 to Blessing Sociètè Anonyme and renamed Elias X. Reflagged to Lebanon and operated under the management of General Marine Agency. Management transferred to Orizon Shipping Co. in 1962. She lost her rudder in the Arabian Sea (12°40′N 63°59′E) on 4 August 1962 whilst on a voyage from Mormugao to an Italian port. She was towed in to Bombay on 22 August. She arrived at Trieste under tow on 24 September and was subsequently towed to Naples and laid up as a constructive total loss. She was scrapped at Valencia in April 1964.

== Sidney Edgerton ==
Sidney Edgerton was built by Oregon Shipbuilding Corporation. Her keel was laid on 15 August 1943. She was launched on 2 September and delivered on 9 September. Built for the WSA, she was operated under the management of American Mail Line Ltd. Sold in 1947 to Atlantic Maritime Co. and renamed Atlantic Captain. Reflagged to Panama and operated under the management of Boyd, Weir & Sewell. Management transferred to S. Livanos & Co. in 1948, then Maritime Brokers in 1952. Sold in 1953 to Atlantic Freighters Ltd. Reflagged to Liberia and operated under the management of S. Livanos Ltd. Sold in 1962 to White Star Maritime Ltd. and renamed White Cloud. Reflagged to Panama, remaining under the same management. She was driven ashore at the entrance to Humboldt Bay on 14 October 1962 whilst on a voyage from Coos Bay to Eureka, California. She was refloated on 22 October and towed in to Eureka. Declared a constructive total loss, she was scrapped at Seattle in 1963.

== Sidney Howard ==
Sidney Howard was a tanker built by California Shipbuilding Corporation. She was completed in November 1943. To the United States Navy and renamed Armadillo. Returned to the WSA in May 1946 and renamed Sidney Howard. Sold in 1948 to Windsor Navigation Co. and renamed Dean H. Sold in 1954 to Windsor Tankers Inc. and renamed Chris H. Reflagged to Liberia and operated under the management of Windsor Navigation Co. Converted to a cargo ship at Jacksonville, Florida in 1955. Now 7,161 GRT. Sold in 1960 to Winco Tankers Inc. Reflagged to the United States, remaining under the same management. To USMC in 1963 and laid up in the James River. She was scrapped at Castellón de la Plana in May 1972.

== Sidney H. Short ==
Sidney H. Short was built by Permanente Metals Corporation. Her keel was laid on 10 February 1944. She was launched on 28 February and delivered on 7 March. She was sold for scrapping in February 1970 and was scrapped at New Orleans in April 1973.

== Sidney Lanier ==
Sidney Lanier was built by St. Johns River Shipbuilding Company, Jacksonville. Her keel was laid on 22 October 1942. She was launched on 21 May 1943 and delivered on 7 July. She was scrapped at Bellingham, Washington in August 1961.

== Sidney Sherman ==
Sidney Sherman was built by Todd Houston Shipbuilding Corporation. Her keel was laid on 1 May 1943. She was launched on 8 June and delivered on 25 June. She was scrapped at Baltimore in August 1959.

== Sidney Wright ==
Sidney Wright was built by Bethlehem Fairfield Shipyard. Her keel was laid on 22 May 1944. She was launched on 26 June and delivered on 7 July. Built for the WSA, she was operated under the management of Dichmann, Wright & Pugh. Sold in 1946 to United States Navigation Co., New York. Sold in 1947 to Southern Seas Steamship Co. and renamed Morgan H. Grace. Reflagged to Panama. Sold in 1948 to Wallem & Co., Hong Kong and renamed Shahrokh, remaining under the Panamanian flag. Sold in 1951 to Society Internationale des Transportes, Panama and renamed Pantanassa. Sold in 1953 to Golfo Deseado Compania Navigation, Panama and rehamed Efthalassos. Reflagged to Liberia and operated under the management of Boyd, Weir & Sewell. Management transferred to Lemos Bros. in 1955. Renamed Doctor G. Lemos in 1960. She was scrapped at Hong Kong in May 1967.

== Sieur Duluth ==
Sieur Duluth was built by Permanente Metals Corporation. Her keel was laid on 27 December 1942. She was launched on 4 February 1943 and delivered on 18 February. To the Soviet Union under Lend-Lease and renamed Tungus. Reported scrapped in 1970.

== Sieur de la Salle ==
Sieur de la Salle was built by Delta Shipbuilding Company. Her keel was laid on 13 Julu 1944. She was launched on 23 August and delivered on 4 October. She was scrapped at Panama City, Florida in 1966.

== Silas Weir Mitchell ==
Silas Weir Mitchell was built by Bethlehem Fairfield Shipyard. Her keel was laid on 26 March 1943. She was launched on 29 April and delivered on 8 May. She was scrapped at Panama City, Florida in August 1966.

== Silvester Gardiner ==
Silvester Gardiner was built by New England Shipbuilding Corporation. Her keel was laid on 4 May 1943. She was launched on 4 May 1943. She was launched on 23 June and delivered on 13 July. Built for the WSA, she was operated under the management of American Export Lines. Sold in 1947 to Lorentzens Skibs A/S, Oslo, Norway and renamed Jane Stove. Operated under the management of Lorentzens Rederi Co. Sold in 1956 to Compania Libano Ltd, Panama and renamed Capetan Petros. Operated under the management of Loucan Nomicos. Reflagged to Costa Rica. Reflagged to Panama in 1957 and then Greece in 1961. Sold in 1965 to Compania Libano Ltds, Piraeus and renamed Kyramantha. She was sold for scrapping in July 1967, arriving at Hirao on 24 July.

== Silvestre Escalante ==
Silvestre Escalante was built by Permanente Metals Corporation. Her keel was laid on 21 February 1944. She was launched on 31 March and delivered on 30 April. She was scrapped at Terminal Island in September 1961.

== Simeon G. Reed ==
Simeon G. Reed was built by Oregon Shipbuilding Corporation. Her keel was laid on 5 November 1943. She was launched on 24 November and delivered on 3 December. She was converted to a crane barge at Jersey City, New Jersey in March 1968.

== Simon Bamberger ==
Simon Bamberger was built by Permanente Metals Corporation. Her keel was laid on 9 September 1943. She was launched on 3 October and delivered on 17 October. Built for the WSA, she was operated under the management of American-Hawaiian Steamship Company. Laid up in 1946, she was sold in 1947 to Lloyd Triestino S.A. di Navigazione, Trieste and renamed Onda. Sold in 1963 to San Antonio Inc. and renamed Antojo. Reflagged to Panama and operated under the management of Compagnia Armatoriale Italiana. She was scrapped at Split, Yugoslavia in May 1970.

== Simon B. Elliott ==
Simon B. Elliott was built by Bethlehem Fairfield Shipyard. Her keel was laid on 16 September 1943. She was launched as Simon B. Elliott on 9 October and completed as Samnesse on 18 October. To the MoWT under Lend-Lease. Operated under the management of A. Holt & Co. Sold in 1947 to China Mutual Steam Navigation Co. and renamed Eumaeus. Remaining under the same flag and management. Sold in 1952 to Glen Line Ltd. and renamed Glenshiel. Requisitioned by the MoT in 1956 for use as a storeship during the Suez Crisis. Sold in 1957 to China Mutual Steam Navigation Co. and renamed Euryades. Sold in 1961 to Bounty Shipping Co., Liverpool and renamed Marine Bounty. Operated under the management of Wheelock, Marsden & Co. Sold in 1962 to Prestige Shipping Co., Hong Kong, remaining under the same flag and management. Sold in 1964 to Mercury Shipping Co., Nassau, Bahamas, remaining under the British flag. She ran aground at Hasieshan, China (25°20′N 119°45′E) on 25 February 1966 whilst on a voyage from Chingwangtao, China to Singapore. She was refloated but ran aground again and broke in two and was a total loss.

== Simon Benson ==
Simon Benson was built by Oregon Shipbuilding Corporation. Her keel was laid on 30 May 1943. She was launched on 19 June and delivered on 27 June. Built for the WSA, she was operated under the management of Sudden & Christenson Inc. Sold in 1949 to Seven Seas Steamship Corp. Operated under the management of Blidberg & Rothchild Co. Management transferred to Orion Shipping & Trading Co. in 1952. Renamed Seamerit in 1953. Sold in 1954 to Siete Mares Society Maritime, Panama and renamed Agia Triada. Reflagged to Liberia, remaining under the same management. Renamed Andros Trident in 1956. Sold in 1957 to Transmarine Navigation Inc., remaining under the same flag and management. Management transferred to Maritime Overseas Corp. in 1960. Sold in 1963 to Caroline Navigation Inc. and renamed San Benito. Remaining under the Liberian flag and operated under the management of Ceres Shipping Co. She was scrapped at Hirao in January 1968.

== Simon Bolivar ==
Simon Bolivar was built by Oregon Shipbuilding Corporation. Her keel was laid on 23 March 1943. She was launched on 11 April and delivered on 19 April. Laid up in the James River post-war, she was scrapped at Philadelphia in July 1971.

== Simon Newcomb ==
Simon Newcomb was built by California Shipbuilding Corporation. Her keel was laid on 27 February 1943. She was launched on 26 March and delivered on 9 April. She was scrapped at Hirao in November 1959.

== Simon Willard ==
Simon Willard was built by Alabama Drydock and Shipbuilding Company, Mobile. She was delivered on 31 December 1942. She was scrapped at Portland, Oregon in August 1970.

== S. M. Babcock ==
S. M. Babcock was built by Oregon Shipbuilding Corporation. Her keel was laid on 5 October 1942. She was launched on 1 November and delivered on 12 November. She was scrapped at Portland, Oregon in August 1967.

== Smith Thompson ==
Smith Thompson was built by California Shipbuilding Corporation. Her keel was laid on 7 September 1942. She was launched on 11 October and delivered on 29 October. She was scrapped at Philadelphia in 1963.

== S. M. Shoemaker ==
S. M. Shoemaker was built by Bethlehem Fairfield Shipyard. Her keel was laid on 8 July 1944. She was launched on 10 August and delivered on 26 August. Built for the WSA, she was operated under the management of Marine Transport Lines. Management transferred to Marine Operating Co. in 1946. Sold in 1949 to Shipenter Lines Inc. and renamed Taddel. Renamed Villa Marion in 1959 and reflagged to Liberia. Sold in 1963 to First Navigation Corp., Panama and renamed Everlife. Remaining under the Liberian flag and operated under the management of First Steamship Co. She was scrapped at Kaohsiung in June 1969.

== Solomon Juneau ==
Solomon Juneau was built by California Shipbuilding Corporation. Her keel was laid on 9 January 1943. She was launched on 6 February and delivered on 23 February. Built for the WSA, she was operated under the management of Weyerhaeuser Steamship Co. She was torpedoed and damaged by a midget submarine off Boulogne, France on 9 April 1943 whilst on a voyage from Ghent, Belgium to Cherbourg, France. She was towed to Dover, United Kingdom and then to Gravesend. Subsequently repaired and returned to service. She was scrapped at Panama City, Florida in 1962.

== Soter Ortynsky ==
Soter Ortynsky was built by J. A. Jones Construction Company, Panama City. Her keel was laid on 25 October 1944. She was launched on 27 November and delivered on 8 November. She was scrapped at Baltimore in January 1960.

== Spetsae ==
Spetsae was built by St. Johns River Shipbuilding Company. Her keel was laid on 8 January 1945. She was launched as Thomas L. Haley on 12 February and delivered as Spetsae on 25 February. To the Greek Government under Lend-Lease. Sold in 1947 to Stavros S. Niarchos, Piraeus and renamed Captain K. Papazoglou. Sold later that year to N. Coumantaros, Athens. Placed under the management of Union Maritime & Shipping Co. in 1948. Sold in 1949 to Stavros S. Niarchos and placed under the management of Simpson, Spence & Co. Management transferred to North American Shipping & Trading Co. in 1952. Sold in 1954 to Efploia Shipping Corp. and renamed Pantanassa. Operated under the management of G. Lemos Bros. Sold in 1961 to Eftychia Compania Navigation, Panama and renamed Giorgios Tsakiroglou. Reflagged to Lebanon and operated under the management of Franco Shipping Co. Sold in 1964 to Efthia Compania Navigation. Operated under the management of Carapanayoti & Co. Management transferred to Shipping & Trading Co. in 1968. She was scrapped at Whampoa in May 1969.

== Stage Door Canteen ==
Stage Door Canteen was built by Bethlehem Fairfield Shipyard. Her keel was laid on 19 September 1943. She was launched on 12 October and delivered on 21 October. Built for the WSA, she was operated under the management of North Atlantic & Gulf Steamship Co., New York. Sold to her managers in 1947 and renamed Norcuba. Sold in 1949 to Tramar Shipping Co., New York and renamed Tramar I. Sold in 1951 to West Coast Transport Co., then sold later that year to Stratford Steamship Co. Renamed Seanan in 1952 and placed under the management of Orion Shipping & Trading Co. Sold in 1956 to Eugene Panagopulas and renamed Albatross, remaining under the same management. Sold in 1961 to Midwest Shippinhg & Trading Corp. and placed under the management of Martran Steamship Corp. Returned to USMC later that year. She was scrapped at Everett in 1961.

== Stalinabad ==
Stalinabad was built by Oregon Shipbuilding Corporation. Her keel was laid on 3 July 1943. She was launched as Willis C. Hawley on 24 July and delivered as Stalinabad on 31 July. To the Soviet Union under Lend-Lease. Renamed Dushambe in 1962. Name subsequently reported as Dushanbe. She was scrapped in 1975, and removed from shipping registers in 1977.

== Stalingrad ==
Stalingrad was built by Permanente Metals Corporation. Her keel was laid on 22 March 1944. She was launched as Thomas F. Flaherty on 11 April and delivered as Stalingrad on 18 April. To the Soviet Union under Lend-Lease. Renamed Volgograd in 1962. To Far East Shipping Co. in 1978 and converted to non-seagoing use at Vostochny. Deleted from shipping registers in 1982.

== Stanford Newel ==
Stanford Newel was built by Oregon Shipbuilding Corporation. Her keel was laid on 14 April 1943. She was launched on 4 May and delivered on 12 May. She was scrapped at Oakland in January 1970.

== Stanford White ==
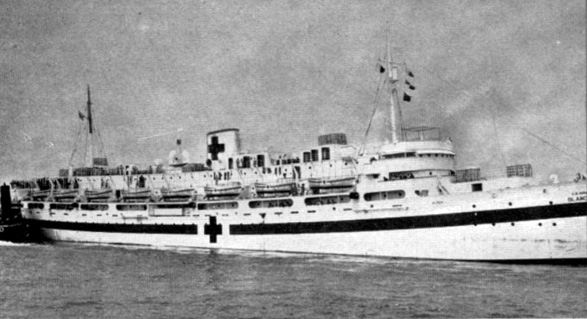
USAHS Blanche F. Sigman

Stanford White was built by California Shipbuilding Corporation. Her keel was laid on 9 March 1943. She was launched on 5 April and delivered on 17 April. To the United States Army in November 1943, converted to a hospital ship by Todd Shipyards, Hoboken, New Jersey. Renamed Blanche F. Sigman. Returned to the WSA in April 1946 and laid up in the James River. She was sold to shipbreakers in Detroit, Michigan in January 1974.

== Stanley Matthews ==
Stanley Matthews was built by Permanente Metals Corporation. Her keel was laid on 18 October 1942. She was launched on 20 November and delivered on 30 November. She was scrapped at Philadelphia in December 1963.

== Stanley R. Fisher ==
Stanley R. Fisher was built by New England Shipbuilding Corporation. Her keel was laid on 15 April 1945. She was launched on 8 June and delivered on 30 June. Built for the WSA, she was operated under the management of United States Lines. Sold in 1947 to Marine Interests Corp., Jersey City and renamed Marine Courier. Rebuilt as a bulk carrier, now 6,625 GRT. Sold in 1952 to Marine Navigation Co. Sold in 1962 to Marine Transport Lines. She was scrapped at Castellón de la Plana in August 1965.

== Stanton H. King ==
Stanton H. King was built by New England Shipbuilding Corporation. Her keel was laid on 26 January 1944. She was launched on 4 March and delivered on 16 March. She was scrapped at Panama City, Florida in December 1964.

== Star of Oregon ==
Star of Oregon was built by Oregon Shipbuilding Corporation. Her keel was laid on 19 May 1941. She was launched on 27 September and delivered on 31 December. Built for the WSA, she was operated under the management of States Steamship Co. She was torpedoed, shelled and sunk off Trinidad by U-162 on 30 August 1942 whilst on a voyage from Durban to Trinidad.

== Starr King ==
Starr King was built by California Shipbuilding Corporation. Her keel was laid on 21 June 1942. She was launched on 31 July and delivered on 20 August. She was torpedoed and damaged by I-21 175 nautical miles (324 km) east of Sydney, Australia (34°15′S 154°20′E) on 10 February 1943 whilst on a voyage from Sydney to New Caledonia. She was taken in tow by HMAS Warramunga but the tow was lost and she sank later that day.

== Stepas Darius ==
Stepas Darius was built by J. A. Jones Construction Company, Panama City. Her keel was laid on 14 August 1944. She was launched on 25 September and delivered on 9 October. Built for the WSA, she was operated under the management of W. J. Rountree & Co. Sold in 1947 to Compania de Navigation Phoceana de Panama, Panama and renamed Mando. She ran aground in the Isles of Scilly, United Kingdom on 21 January 1955 whilst on a voyage from the Hampton Roads, Virginia, United States to IJmuiden, Netherlands and was a total loss.

== Stephen A. Douglas ==
Stephen A. Douglas was built by Oregon Shipbuilding Corporation. Her keel was laid on 18 September 1941. She was launched on 21 January 1942 and delivered on 20 March. She was scrapped at Beaumont in 1966.

== Stephen Beasley ==
Stephen Beasley was built by St. Johns River Shipbuilding Company. Her keel was laid on 13 May 1944. She was launched on 24 June and delivered on 13 July. She was scrapped at Beaumont in March 1961.

== Stephen B. Elkins ==
Stephen B. Elkins was built by Oregon Shipbuilding Corporation. Her keel was laid on 11 December 1942. She was launched on 5 January 1943 and delivered on 12 January. She was scrapped at Oakland in January 1961.

== Stephen C. Foster ==
Stephen C. Foster was built by Todd Houston Shipbuilding Corporation. Her keel was laid on 17 November 1942. She was launched on 12 January 1943 and delivered on 28 January. She was scrapped at Oakland in June 1961.

== Stephen Crane ==
Stephen Crane was built by Permanente Metals Corporation. Her keel was laid on 30 May 1943. She was launched on 20 June and delivered on 30 June. Built for the WSA, she was operated under the management of Isthmian Steamship Company. She was bombed and severely damaged by the Japanese using a salvaged American aircraft in Langemak Bay on 1 February 1944. She subsequently ran aground. Refloated and declared a constructive total loss. She was towed to San Francisco, where she was repaired and returned to service. Laid up in the James River post-war, she was scrapped at Baltimore in 1958.

== Stephen F. Austin ==
Stephen F. Austin was built by Todd Houston Shipbuilding Corporation. Her keel was laid on 23 October 1941. She was launched on 22 May 1942 and delivered on 13 July. Built for the WSA, she was operated under the management of Lykes Bros. Steamship Co. She was scrapped at New Orleans in September 1967.

== Stephen Furdek ==
Stephen Furdek was built by J. A. Jones Construction Company, Panama City. Her keel was laid on 16 March 1944. She was launched on 28 April and delivered on 23 May. Laid up at Mobile post-war, she was scrapped at Kearny or Panama City, Florida in June 1970.

== Stephen G. Porter ==
Stephen G. Porter was built by Oregon Shipbuilding Corporation. Her keel was laid on 28 September 1943. She was launched on 16 October and delivered on 24 October. She was scrapped at Oakland in December 1961.

== Stephen Girard ==
Stephen Girard was built by Oregon Shipbuilding Corporation. Her keel was laid on 4 September 1942. She was launched on 5 October and delivered on 16 October. Built for the WSA, she was operated under the management of Isthmian Steamship Company. To the French Government in 1947 and renamed Saint Mère Eglise. Operated under the management of Compagnie Générale Transatlantique. Management transferred to Compagnie des Messageries Maritimes in 1948, then the Ministére de la Marine Marchande in 1961. Sold in 1962 to Charles Auguste Audibert, Monte Carlo and renamed Vimy, remaining under the French flag. Sold in 1963 to A/B Paulin Chartering O/Y, Åbo, Finland and renamed Margrethe Paulin. She was scrapped at Kaohsiung in March 1968.

== Stephen H. Long ==
Stephen H. Long was built by California Shipbuilding Corporation. Her keel was laid on 6 June 1943. She was launched on 29 June and delivered on 12 July. Built for the WSA, she was operated under the management of Luckenbach Steamship Company. To the United States War Department in 1946. Loaned to the Chinese Government and renamed Hai Yu. Operated under the management of China Merchants Steam Navigation Co. Sold to her managers in 1947. Reflagged to Taiwan in 1965. She was scrapped at Kaohsiung in December 1967.

== Stephen Hopkins (I) ==
Stephen Hopkins was built by Permanente Metals Corporation. Her keel was laid on 2 January 1942. She was launched on 14 April and delivered on 11 May. Built for the WSA, she was operated under the management of Luckenbach Steamship Company. She was sunk in the Atlantic Ocean (28°08′S 11°59′W) in an engagement with the German auxiliary cruiser Stier on 27 September 1942 whilst on a voyage from Durban to Bahia, Brazil. Stephen Hopkins inflicted sufficient damage on Stier that the latter also sank.

== Stephen Hopkins (II) ==
Stephen Hopkins was built by Permanente Metals Corporation. Her keel was laid on 21 April 1944. She was launched on 10 May and delivered on 19 May. She was scrapped at New Orleans in June 1967.

== Stephen Johnson Field ==
Stephen Johnson Field was built by California Shipbuilding Corporation. Her keel was laid on 14 April 1942. She was launched on 9 June and delivered on 28 June. Built for the WSA, she was operated under the management of American-Hawaiian Steamship Company. To the French Government in 1947 and renamed Mortain. Operated under the management of Compagnie Générale Transatlantique. Management transferred to Compagnie des Messageries Maritimes in 1948, then Société Navale Caennaise, Lamy et Compagnie in 1961. Sold in 1963 to Chowgale Steamship Co., Goa, India and renamed Maratha Industry. Operated under the management of Fife Shipping Co. Sold in 1965 to Priority Maritime Transport & Trading Ltd. and renamed Alexandros. Reflagged to Cyprus and operated under the management of Lemnos Co. She was scrapped at Whampoa, China in July 1968.

== Stephen Leacock ==
Stephen Leacock was built by Southeastern Shipbuilding Corporation. Her keel was laid on 22 May 1944. She was launched on 11 July and delivered on 28 July. She was scrapped at New Orleans in November 1969.

== Stephen M. White ==
Stephen M. White was built by California Shipbuilding Corporation. Her keel was laid on 7 October 1942. She was launched on 9 November and delivered on 28 November. She was scrapped at Portland, Oregon in 1967.

== Stephen R. Mallory ==
Stephen R. Mallory was a tank transport built by J. A. Jones Construction Company, Panama City. Her keel was laid on 19 October 1943. She was launched on 27 November and delivered on 20 January 1944. Laid up in the Hudson River post-war, she was scrapped at Santander in February 1971.

== Stephen Smith ==
Stephen Smith was built by J. A. Jones Construction Company, Panama City. Her keel was laid on 26 September 1944. She was launched on 31 October and delivered on 13 November. She was scrapped at Baltimore in June 1960.

== Stephen T. Mather ==
Stephen T. Mather was built by California Shipbuilding Corporation. Her keel was laid on 27 May 1943. She was launched on 18 June and delivered on 29 June. She was scrapped at Portland, Oregon in November 1966.

== Stephen Vincent Benet ==
Stephen Vincent Benet was built by California Shipbuilding Corporation. Her keel was laid on 2 June 1943. She was launched on 28 June and delivered on 11 July. She was scrapped at Portland, Oregon in November 1967.

== Stephen W. Gambrill ==
Stephen W. Gambrill was built by Bethlehem Fairfield Shipyard. Her keel was laid on 31 January 1944. She was launched on 29 February and delivered on 13 March. Built for the WSA, she was operated under the management of American Liberty Steamship Co. Management transferred to Alcoa Steamship Co. in 1946. Sold in 1948 to West Coast Trans-Oceanic Steamship Line, Portland, Oregon and renamed Columbia Trader. Sold in 1954 to Ocean Traders S.A., Panama and renamed Sea Breeze. Reflagged to Liberia and operated under the management of D. J. Negroponte. Renamed Sea Maiden in 1957. Management transferred to Seatraders Inc. later that year. Renamed Nora and reflagged to Greece in 1960. She was scrapped at Singapore in August 1967.

== Stephen W. Kearny ==
Stephen W. Kearny was built by Permanente Metals Corporation. Her keel was laid on 28 July 1943. She was launched on 19 August and delivered on 29 August. Laid up at Mobile post-war, she was scrapped there in December 1971.

== Stevenson Taylor ==
Stevenson Taylor was built by Bethlehem Fairfield Shipyard. Her keel was laid on 8 April 1943. She was launched on 11 May and delivered on 20 May. She was scrapped at Panama City, Florida in January 1970.

== St. Olaf ==
St. Olaf was built by Bethlehem Fairfield Shipyard. Her keel was laid on 6 January 1942. She was launched on 12 April and delivered on 20 May. To the United States Army in 1943. Assigned name Jasmine not used. Converted to a hospital ship at Boston. Now 7,940 GRT. Converted to a transport ship at San Pedro, California in November 1945. Laid up post-war, she was scrapped at Portland, Oregon in April 1963.

== Streator Seam ==
Streator Seam was a collier built by Delta Shipbuilding Company. Her keel was laid on 26 April 1945. She was launched on 29 June and delivered on 31 August. Built for the WSA, she was operated under the management of Lykes Bros. Steamship Co. Sold in 1947 to Eastern Gas & Fuel Associates. Sold later that year to Mystic Steamship Division and renamed Lexington. Operated under the management of her former owners. Sold in 1961 to Massachusetts Trustees of Eastern Gas & Fuel Associates. Converted to a non-propelled barge at Baltimore in 1963 and renamed Eastern I. She was driven ashore near the mouth of the Shark River, New Jersey on 25 December 1969 and broke in two.

== Suchan ==
Suchan was built by California Shipbuilding Corporation. Her keel was laid on 10 April 1942. She was launched on 2 May and delivered on 15 May. To the Soviet Union under Lend-Lease and renamed Suchan. Renamed Partizansk in 1977, converted to a storage ship. Listed as "non-seagoing" c.1977.

== Sukhona ==
Sukhona was built by Permanente Metals Corporation. Her keel was laid on 14 February 1944. She was launched on as George Coggeshall 17 March and delivered as Sukhona on 15 April. To the Soviet Union under Lend-Lease. She was scrapped at Castellón de la Plana in June 1971.

== Sul Ross ==
Sul Ross was built by Todd Houston Shipbuilding Corporation. Her keel was laid on 3 March 1944. She was launched on 8 April and delivered on 20 April. Built for the WSA, she was operated under the management of Standard Fruit & Steamship Co. To the United States War Department in 1946. Sold in 1947 to Lloyd Triestino S.A. di Navigazione, Trieste and renamed Astra. Sold in 1963 to West African Carriers Corp. and renamed Sil. Reflagged to Liberia. She was scrapped at Kaohsiung in February 1968.

== Sumner I. Kimball ==
Sumner I. Kimball was built by New England Shipbuilding Corporation. Her keel was laid on 13 August 1943. She was launched on 10 October and delivered on 21 October. Built for the WSA, she was operated under the management of Mystic Steamship Co. She was torpedoed and sunk in the Atlantic Ocean (52°35′N 35°00′W) by U-960 on 16 January 1944 whilst on a voyage from Loch Ewe to New York.

== Sun Yat-Sen ==
Sun Yat-Sen was built by Marinship Corporation. Her keel was laid on 13 February 1943. She was launched on 25 March and delivered on 17 April. Built for the WSA, she was operated under the management of North Atlantic & Gulf Steamship Co. Sold in 1947 to I. A. Hamres Rederi A/S, Oslo and renamed Livia. Sold in July 1947 to Simonsen & Astrup, Oslo. Sold in 1948 to Skibs A/S Mylla, Oslo. Operated under the management of her former owners. Sold in December 1950 to Dido Compania Navigation, Puerto Limon, Costa Rica and renamed Telamon. Sold in 1958 to Skiron Shipping Co., Puerto Limon and renamed Polikos. Renamed Policos in 1960. Sold in 1965 to Marithaca Shipping & Trading Corp., Monrovia. She was scrapped at Hirao in September 1968.

== Susan Colby ==
Susan Colby was built by New England Shipbuilding Corporation. Her keel was laid on 24 November 1943. She was launched on 13 January 1944 and delivered on 26 January. Built for the WSA, she was operated under the management of Moore-McCormack Lines. Sold in 1947 to Commercial & Shipbuilding Co. and renamed Olga. Reflagged to Greece and operated under the management of P. Argyropoulos. Sold later that year to Société Commerciale et d'Armament, Athens. She put in to Cape Town, South Africa on 16 October 1967 having suffered a structural failure. She was scrapped at Kaohsiung in August 1968.

== Sverre Helmersen ==
Sverre Helmersen was built by Bethlehem Fairfield Shipyard. Her keel was laid on 7 March 1944. She was launched as William Hodson on 8 April and delivered as Sverre Helmersen on 22 April. She was damaged by a mine in the North Sea (51°19′N 1°47′E) on 23 April 1945 whilst on a voyage from Antwerp to New York. She was towed in to Dover, then to Falmouth, United Kingdom. Returned to the United States Government in 1946, declared a constructive total loss. She was scrapped at Zeebrugge, Belgium in July 1948.

== S. Wiley Wakeman ==
S. Wiley Wakeman was built by Bethlehem Fairfield Shipyard. Her keel was laid on 26 June 1944. She was launched on 28 July and delivered on 11 August. She ran aground on a wreck 12 nautical miles (22 km) south of Tobago on 13 September 1946 whilst on a voyage from the Hampton Roads to Buenos Aires. She was refloated on 22 September and towed in to Port of Spain, Trinidad, then to Mobile where she was laid up. She was scrapped at New Orleans in September 1948.

== Sylvester Pattie ==
Sylvester Pattie was built by California Shipbuilding Corporation. Her keel was laid on Her keel was laid on 26 October 1943. She was launched on 23 November and delivered on 12 December. She was scrapped at Wilmington, North Carolina in October 1967.
