= Samuel Jackson (disambiguation) =

Samuel L. Jackson (born 1948) is an American actor and film producer also credited as Samuel Jackson and Sam Jackson.

Samuel Jackson or Sam Jackson may also refer to:

== Arts and entertainment ==
- Samuel Jackson (artist) (1784–1869), English artist
- Samuel Phillips Jackson (1830–1904), English artist; son of the above
- Samuel P. Jackson (1818–1885), American organist and composer
- Sam Peter Jackson (born 1978), playwright and actor
- Sam Jackson (actor) (born 1993), English actor

== Politics and law ==
- Samuel Jackson (lawyer) (1831–1913), New Zealand attorney and solicitor
- Samuel Jacob Jackson (1848–1942), Manitoba politician
- Samuel D. Jackson (1895–1951), U.S. senator from Indiana
- Samuel Hollister Jackson, lieutenant governor of Vermont

== Sports ==
- Sam Jackson (second baseman) (1849–1930), Anglo-American baseball player
- Samuel Jackson (cricketer) (1859–1941), English cricketer
- Sam Jackson (catcher), American baseball player of the 1880s
- Sam Jackson (pitcher), American baseball player of the 1920s
- Sam Jackson (first baseman), American baseball player of the 1940s
- Sam Jackson (footballer) (born 1998), Liberian association football player
- Sam Jackson V (born 2003), American football quarterback

== Others ==
- Samuel Jackson (Royal Navy officer) (1775–1845), British naval officer
- Samuel Cram Jackson (1830–1879), American Congregational minister
- Samuel Macauley Jackson (1851–1912), American clergyman, editor and author
- Sam Jackson (publisher) (1860–1924), American newspaper publisher
- Samuel Jackson Barnett (1873–1956), American physicist

== See also ==
- Samuel Jackson Jr. House, a historic house in Newton, Massachusetts
- Sammy Jackson (1937–1995), American actor
- Samuel Johnson (disambiguation)
