= Samuel Ealy Johnson =

Samuel Ealy Johnson may refer to:

- Samuel Ealy Johnson Jr. (1877–1937), Texas politician and father of U.S. President Lyndon Baines Johnson
- Samuel Ealy Johnson Sr. (1838–1915), grandfather of U.S. President Lyndon Baines Johnson, and honoree of Johnson City, Texas

== See also ==
- Samuel Johnson (disambiguation)
