= Sam Johnston =

Samuel Johnston or Sam Johnston may refer to:

- Sam Johnston (Yukon politician) (born 1935), politician in the Yukon, Canada
- Sam Johnston (New Brunswick politician), politician in the New Brunswick, Canada
- Sam Johnston (wrestler) (born 1987), American professional wrestler better known as Sami Callihan
- Sammy Johnston (1967–2025), Scottish footballer
- Samuel Johnston (1733–1816), American lawyer and statesman
  - SS Samuel Johnston, a Liberty ship
- Samuel Johnston (footballer) (1866–1910), Irish footballer
- Samuel Johnston (Waterview) (1840–1924), Australian pioneer

== See also ==
- Samuel Johnson (disambiguation)
