= Jimmy Jerome =

Former American football wide receiver

Profile
- Positions: Wingback, tailback

Personal information
- Born: October 18, 1952
- Died: October 1, 1975 (aged 22); Los Angeles County, California, U.S.
- Listed height: 6 ft 1 in (1.85 m)
- Listed weight: 207 lb (94 kg)

Career information
- High school: Wallace-Rose Hill (Wallace, North Carolina)
- College: North Carolina (1972–1974)

James Daniel Jerome (October 18, 1952 – October 1, 1975) was an American college football player. A wingback and tailback, in 1974 he broke North Carolina Tar Heels single-season and career receiving records, ranking among the nation's leaders in both receptions and passing yards. He died in a head-on car crash one year later at age 22.

== Early life ==
Jerome was born in 1952. He attended Wallace-Rose Hill High School in Wallace, North Carolina. He set multiple athletic records in high school, competing in basketball, track, and baseball, and receiving high-school All-America honors as a tailback for the football team.

== North Carolina ==
Jerome played college football for the North Carolina Tar Heels from 1972 to 1974. He twice broke his arm, leading one sports writer to call him "a combination of a black cat crossing his path, the number 13, walking under a ladder and spilling salt." He began his college career as a tailback but was switched to wingback with responsibility to block, catch passes, and run with the ball. As a senior in 1974, he led the Atlantic Coast Conference with 47 receptions (eighth nationally) for 837 yards (sixth nationally). He also tallied 185 rushing yards on 27 carries, an average of 6.9 yards per carry. He broke the prior school receiving records which had been set by Art Weiner in 1949 with 52 catches for 762 yards.

In three years for the Tar Heels, he tallied 1,472 receiving yards, 319 rushing yards, and 84 points scored. He had a career-high 149 receiving yards on September 21, 1974. He received all-ACC honors in 1974 and set an ACC career record for touchdown passes (12). He concluded his college career with 93 passes for 1,472 yards and 319 rushing yards.

== Professional football and death ==
Jerome had a tryout with the Pittsburgh Steelers in the summer of 1975. He also spent several days with the Charlotte Hornets of the World Football League, but rejected a contract to join the club. He was in negotiations with a Canadian Football League team at the time of his death.

While traveling from North Carolina to San Francisco to visit his college roommate Sammy Johnson, Jerome was killed in a head-on car crash on the Pacific Coast Highway in Los Angeles County, California. The crash was caused by a driver traveling in the opposite direction trying to pass a third vehicle.

== See also ==
- North Carolina Tar Heels football statistical leaders
