= Samantha Johnson (disambiguation) =

Samantha Johnson (born 1991) is an American soccer player.

Samantha or Sammie Johnson may also refer to:

- Samantha Johnson (beauty pageant) (born 1984), American beauty queen
- Samantha Johnson (singer), American singer, contestant in America's Got Talent in 2015
- Sammie Johnson (born 1992), Australian rules footballer

== See also ==
- Samuel Johnson (disambiguation)
