= The Preserving Local History and Educational Trust =

New Zealand charity for preservation of historical newspapers

The Preserving Local History and Educational Trust (Te Pupuri I Nga Hitori o Te Rohe Trust) is a New Zealand charitable trust focused on digital preservation. Its major project, Your Stories - Preserving Local Histories for our Tamariki, digitises newspapers published in New Zealand from 1840 to 2000 that are at risk of loss or decay.

== History ==
The idea for the Trust grew out of a publication by Andy Fenton titled Mind the Gap: Transforming the National Newspaper Collection: A collection management approach to preserving the National Newspaper Collection. Fenton notes that despite the National Library of New Zealand's Papers Past initiative making newspapers available online, there were about 3.3 million pages available in Papers Past in 2014, from an estimated total of 30 million possible pages. Community newspapers with local information were not being addressed.

The Trust was established as a New Zealand charitable trust in 2022, its purposes being “the advancement of education, the preservation of New Zealand’s cultural heritage, and any other matter beneficial to the community”. The mission is “to preserve the stories that have helped to shape our communities and our nation, and to make these accessible to New Zealanders both at home and abroad.” Its inaugural trustees were Anne Jackman, Jane Hill, Andy Fenton and Bruce Murray, with Dr Ross Harvey as Adviser and board member. Dr Stephen Hardman is the Secretary of the Trust. In 2024 Professor Lachy Paterson was appointed as a Trustee to fill the position vacated on the death of Bruce Murray, and in 2025 Dr Felicity Barnes joined the Board as a Trustee. Jane Hill stepped down as a Trustee in 2025.

The Trust has Strategic Partnerships with New Zealand Micrographic Services, and the National Library of New Zealand.

== Activities ==
The Trust's major project is Your Stories - Preserving Local Histories for Our Tamariki. Newspapers published in New Zealand from 1840 to 2000 that are at risk of loss or decay are identified and their locations ascertained, assembling as complete a run as possible. The title is digitised and made available, initially on the Trust’s Recollect site and then ingested into the National Digital Heritage Archive and eventually uploaded to Papers Past. Anyone with access to the internet is able to view the digital images of the newspapers at any time (rights permitting).

The first title digitised by the Trust to be made available on Papers Past was the Marlborough Express for 1921–1952, added on 28 May 2025.

Titles digitised (in full or part) under the Trust's auspices up to September 2025 and available on the Trust's Recollect site or on Papers Past are:

- Chatham Islander
- Devonport Gazette and Greater North Shore Advocate
- Marlborough Express
- Mount News
- News (Central Otago)
- North Shore Gazette
- Northcote Athenaeum Meteor
- Opotiki News
- Ruapehu Bulletin
- Otago Witness pictorial supplements
- Taupo Times
- Waimarino Bulletin

Funding has been secured by grants from Lotteries Environment & Heritage Committee and the Russell Henderson Trust, following a grant from Manatû Taonga, Ministry for Culture and Heritage which gave the impetus and confidence needed to form the Trust.

The Trust's activities are increasingly receiving attention in publications and in the media. For example, David Verran has published articles in Channel: North Shore’s Monthly Magazine using the digitised Devonport newspapers on the Trust's Recollect site; and two of the Trust's Board members, Ross Harvey and Lachy Paterson, presented the paper ‘Community newspapers: Ensuing a digital past’ at the Centre for the Book Symposium, Dunedin, 22 November 2024. Media interest has included interviews with the Trust's Chair, Andy Fenton, on Radio New Zealand (such as 'Saving community newspapers of the past ', Andy Fenton interviewed by Jesse Mulligan, 8 February 2025).
