= Marlborough Express =

New Zealand newspaper

- Type: Daily newspaper
- Founder(s): Samuel Johnson and Thomas Johnson
- Founded: 1866
- Headquarters: Blenheim, New Zealand
- Website: www.thepress.co.nz/marlborough

The Marlborough Express is a newspaper serving the Marlborough area of New Zealand. Its headquarters are in Blenheim and it has been published there since 1866. The final print run of the daily issue was published on 30 July 2025. The newspaper is owned by media company Stuff.

== Ownership ==
The Marlborough Express was set up by the printer, journalist and editor Samuel Johnson and his brother Thomas. They arrived in Blenheim in April 1866 and intended to set up a weekly that served all of Marlborough Province, in opposition to the parochial papers already serving Blenheim (Wairau Record) and Picton (Marlborough Press). Johnson sold the newspaper to Smith Furness and James Boundy in 1879. Smith Furness (1852–1921) also purchased the Marlborough Times (founded by John Tait in 1879) in 1895 and ran it as a morning paper until 1905.

The Marlborough Express remained in the Furness family until 1998, when it was acquired by Independent Newspapers Limited (INL). Fairfax New Zealand, now Stuff Ltd, bought the INL mastheads in 2003.

== History ==
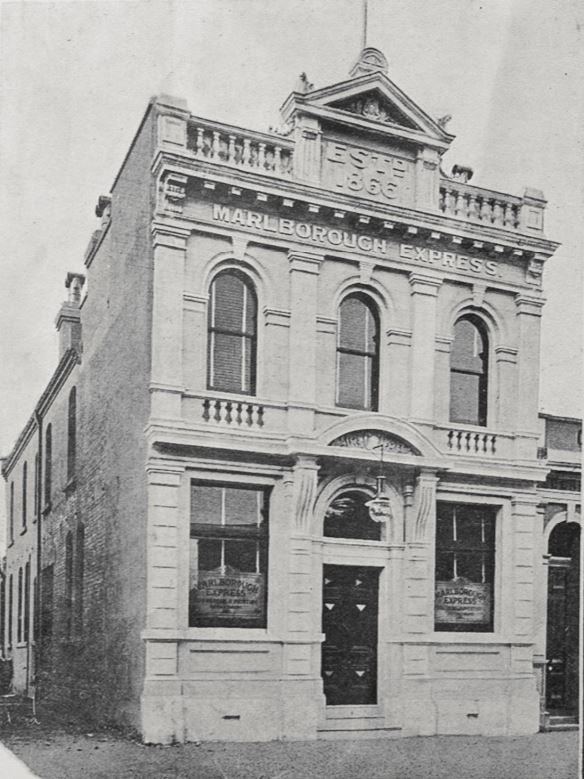
New premises of the Marlborough Express, 1906

The Marlborough Express was published from 1866 as a weekly, and from 1873 was published twice a week. It became a daily in 1880 and took over its rivals: the Marlborough Times in 1895, and the Marlborough Press in 1948.

In 1906 the newspaper moved to a new purpose-built building "of a design approved all over the Colony for convenience, appearance, and of space" that was equipped with then-new linotype typesetting machines. Similar machines were used until computerisation in the 1980s.

In 2007 the newspaper won a Qantas Media Award for "best newspaper of the year (under 25,000 circulation) and best community newspaper, the Saturday Express", and in 2010 it was a finalist for "best newspaper of the year (under 30,000 circulation)" in the same awards.

In 2011 printing of the paper shifted from Blenheim to Nelson.

The paper made headlines nationally in 2013 when it published a cartoon by Al Nisbet about the Government's introduction of food in schools that was widely criticised as "racist". The editor of the paper defended the cartoon's publication, saying it was meant to generate discussion. Race relations commissioner Susan Devoy called it "out of line", while then-Prime Minister John Key noted that cartoonists may "blow things out of proportion" and said he took such cartoons "with a grain of salt" since he was often the subject of them. In 2017 the cartoon (and one published in another newspaper) was investigated in court, with the judge declaring that "in the context of a 'free market of ideas' in an essentially socially liberal country, the reasonable person would concede that, albeit incredibly tasteless, the cartoons were not likely to incite hostility or bring people into contempt."

In 2017 publication was reduced to three times a week due to falling advertising revenue and falling circulation, and printing was moved from Nelson to Christchurch. In April 2024 the Marlborough Express launched a digital platform while retaining the thrice-weekly print edition. In July 2025, Stuff stated that the Marlborough Express would shift to a primarily online publication with a daily email newsletter, and the last print edition of the Marlborough Express was published on 30 July 2025. The paper continued to publish its free Weekend Express print edition. As of 2025 the editor was Ian Allen, who was appointed in 2018.

The Marlborough Express was one of the first digitisation projects of The Preserving Local History and Educational Trust (Te Pupuri I Nga Hitori o Te Rohe Trust), with the charity preserving issues from 1921 to 1943.
