= Samuel Johnson (soldier) =

Samuel Johnson (January 28, 1845 - November 24, 1915) was an American soldier and recipient of the Medal of Honor who received the medal for his actions in the American Civil War.

== Biography ==
Johnson was born in Springfield Township, Pennsylvania on January 28, 1845. He enlisted as a private in Company C of 9th Pennsylvania Reserve Regiment on July 27, 1861. He earned his medal in action the Battle of Antietam, Maryland on September 17, 1862. He was wounded in battle and was bound to hospital for nine months. Following Antietam, Johnson was granted the Medal of Honor and a promotion to second lieutenant. He was transferred to the Veteran Reserve Corps in 1863 as stated in General Order No.160 on May 30, 1863. The order was unique as it was the only general order to award a Medal of Honor to a soldier in the Union Army. Johnson died in West Fork, Arkansas. on November 24, 1915, and is now buried in Baker Cemetery, Onda, Arkansas.

== Medal of Honor Citation ==
For extraordinary heroism on 17 September 1862, in action at Antietam, Maryland, for individual bravery and daring in capturing from the enemy two colors of the 1st Texas Rangers (Confederate States of America), receiving in the act a severe wound.
