= Samuel Johnson (New Zealand editor) =

New Zealand printer, newspaper proprietor and editor

Samuel Johnson (16 March 1827 – 6 August 1905) was a New Zealand printer, newspaper proprietor and editor. He was born in Manchester, Lancashire, England, on 16 March 1827.

After a career in journalism and printing in Castleford, Yorkshire, Johnson emigrated to New Zealand with William Rawson Brame's Albertland settlers. The Albertlanders intended to set up a model community in New Zealand, and Johnson was appointed as the group's editor and printer. He left the group in 1862, working in Auckland and Dunedin before returning to Albertown in 1863. The settlement collapsed in 1864, and by 1866 Johnson was living in Blenheim, where he and his brother Thomas established the Marlborough Express. Originally a weekly paper, the Express's circulation eventually increased to twice weekly. Now owned by Stuff Ltd., it prints daily.

Johnson was elected to the Marlborough Provincial Council in 1872; he resigned in 1874. He sold his newspaper in 1879 before returning briefly to England. Back in New Zealand from 1884, he lived in Waipawa and worked for the Waipawa Mail and Hawke's Bay Herald.

Until his death at the age of 78, Johnson was active in the Anglican church, the Freemasons, and his local community. He was survived by his wife, Thereza, and their two children.
