= Samuel Cram Jackson =

American Congregational minister

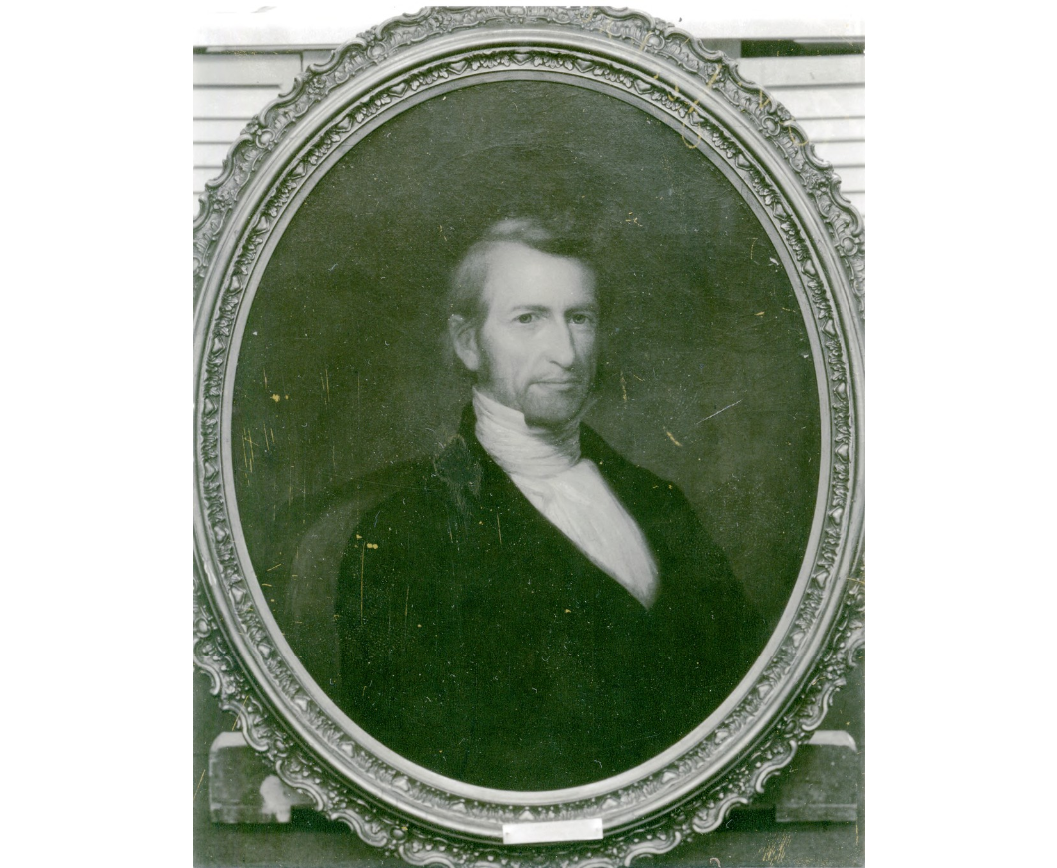
- Born: March 13, 1802; Dorset
- Died: July 26, 1878 (aged 76)
- Alma mater: Middlebury College; Andover Theological Seminary
- Occupation: Priest, librarian

Samuel Cram Jackson or Samuel C. Jackson (March 13, 1802 – July 26, 1878) was an American Congregational minister.

Jackson, son of Reverend Dr. William Jackson, was born in Dorset, Vermont, March 13, 1802. He graduated from Middlebury College in 1821, and studied for some time in the law school at New Haven, Conn. He graduated from Andover Theological Seminary in 1826; was ordained June 6 of the following year as pastor of West Church, in Andover, from which he was dismissed in September 1850, and became assistant secretary of the State Board of Education, also acting librarian of the State Library of Massachusetts, which office he held until 1877. He died July 26, 1878.

== Bibliography ==
- Blessings of the Year, a sermon at West Andover, December 30, 1827
- Funeral Discourse of Reverend S.G. Pierce, Methuen, May 10, 1839
- Thanksgiving Sermon, November 28, 1839
- The License Law Vindicated
- Religious Principle a Source of Public Prosperity
- The Massachusetts Election Sermon (1843)
