= Samuel Johnson (English footballer) =

English footballer

Personal information
- Full name: Samuel Clay Johnson
- Date of birth: July 1881
- Place of birth: Manchester, England
- Date of death: Unknown
- Position: Inside right

Youth career
- Tonge

Senior career*
Years	Team	Apps	(Gls)
1901	Newton Heath	1	(0)
1901–1902	Barnsley	0	(0)
1902–?	Heywood		
Total		1	(0)
- * Club domestic league appearances and goals

Samuel Clay Johnson (July 1881 – unknown) was an English footballer. His regular position was as a forward. Born in Manchester, he began his career with Tonge, but moved to Newton Heath in January 1901. He made his only league appearance on 20 March 1901, playing at inside right in a 3–2 home defeat by Leicester Fosse. He moved to Barnsley for the 1901–02 season, but did not make a single appearance before moving on to Heywood in November 1902.
