= SS Stephen R. Mallory =

World War II Liberty ship of the United States

History

United States
- Name: Stephen R. Mallory
- Namesake: Stephen R. Mallory
- Owner: War Shipping Administration (WSA)
- Operator: Isbrandtsen Steamship Company
- Ordered: as type (Z-EC2-S-C2) hull, MC hull 1540
- Builder: J.A. Jones Construction, Panama City, Florida
- Cost: $1,460,233
- Yard number: 22
- Way number: 1
- Laid down: 19 October 1943
- Launched: 27 November 1943
- Completed: 20 January 1944
- Identification: Call Signal: KVMH
- Fate: Laid up in National Defense Reserve Fleet, Hudson River Group, 8 October 1947; Sold for scrapping, 23 November 1970

General characteristics
- Class & type: type Z-EC2-S-C2, army tank transport
- Tonnage: 10,865 LT DWT; 7,176 GRT
- Displacement: 3,380 long tons (3,434 t) (light); 14,245 long tons (14,474 t) (max)
- Length: 441 feet 6 inches (135 m) oa; 416 feet (127 m) pp; 427 feet (130 m) lwl
- Beam: 57 feet (17 m)
- Draft: 27 ft 9.25 in (8.4646 m)
- Installed power: 2 × Oil fired 450 °F (232 °C) boilers, operating at 220 psi (1,500 kPa); 2,500 hp (1,900 kW)
- Propulsion: 1 × triple-expansion steam engine, (manufactured by General Machinery Corp., Hamilton, Ohio); 1 × screw propeller
- Speed: 11.5 knots (21.3 km/h; 13.2 mph)
- Capacity: 562,608 cubic feet (15,931 m^{3}) (grain); 499,573 cubic feet (14,146 m^{3}) (bale)
- Complement: 38–62 USMM; 21–40 USNAG
- Armament: Varied by ship; Bow-mounted 3-inch (76 mm)/50-caliber gun; Stern-mounted 4-inch (102 mm)/50-caliber gun; 2–8 × single 20-millimeter (0.79 in) Oerlikon anti-aircraft (AA) cannons and/or, 2–8 × 37-millimeter (1.46 in) M1 AA guns

SS Stephen R. Mallory was a Liberty ship built in the United States during World War II. She was named after Stephen R. Mallory, a United States senator from Florida, and the Confederate States Secretary of the Navy during the American Civil War.

== Construction ==
Stephen R. Mallory was laid down on 19 October 1943, under a United States Maritime Commission (MARCOM) contract, MC hull 1540, by J.A. Jones Construction, Panama City, Florida; she was launched on 27 November 1943.

== History ==
She was allocated to Isbrandtsen Steamship Company, on 20 January 1944. On 8 October 1947, she was laid up in the National Defense Reserve Fleet, in the Hudson River Group. On 23 November 1971, she was sold, along with two other ships, for $222,222 to Eckhardt & Co., G.m.b.H., West Germany, to be scrapped. She was removed from the fleet on 6 January 1971.

== Bibliography ==
- "Jones Construction, Panama City FL". ShipbuildingHistory.com. 13 October 2010.
- "Liberty Ships – World War II".
- Maritime Administration. "Stephen R. Mallory". Ship History Database Vessel Status Card. U.S. Department of Transportation, Maritime Administration. Archived from the original on 12 December 2019.
- Davies, James (May 2004). "Specifications (As-Built)" (PDF). p. 23.
- "SS Stephen R. Mallory".
