= SS Samvigna =

World War II Liberty ship of the United States

History

United States
- Name: Samvigna
- Ordered: as type (EC2-S-C1) hull, MC hull 2353
- Builder: J.A. Jones Construction, Brunswick, Georgia
- Cost: $1,058,529
- Yard number: 138
- Way number: 4
- Laid down: 22 February 1944
- Launched: 8 April 1944
- Sponsored by: Mrs. Alexandra G. Brown
- Completed: 20 April 1944
- Fate: Transferred to the British Ministry of War Transport upon completion.

United Kingdom
- Name: Samvigna
- Operator: Hain Steamship
- Acquired: 20 April 1944
- Identification: Call Signal: MYTQ
- Fate: Laid up in National Defense Reserve Fleet, Mobile, Alabama, 30 June 1948; Sold for scrapping, 18 February 1960

General characteristics
- Class & type: Liberty ship; type EC2-S-C1, standard
- Tonnage: 10,865 LT DWT; 7,176 GRT
- Displacement: 3,380 long tons (3,434 t) (light); 14,245 long tons (14,474 t) (max)
- Length: 441 feet 6 inches (135 m) oa; 416 feet (127 m) pp; 427 feet (130 m) lwl
- Beam: 57 feet (17 m)
- Draft: 27 ft 9.25 in (8.4646 m)
- Installed power: 2 × Oil fired 450 °F (232 °C) boilers, operating at 220 psi (1,500 kPa); 2,500 hp (1,900 kW)
- Propulsion: 1 × triple-expansion steam engine, (manufactured by General Machinery Corp., Hamilton, Ohio); 1 × screw propeller
- Speed: 11.5 knots (21.3 km/h; 13.2 mph)
- Capacity: 562,608 cubic feet (15,931 m^{3}) (grain); 499,573 cubic feet (14,146 m^{3}) (bale)
- Complement: 38–62 USMM; 21–40 USNAG
- Armament: Varied by ship; Bow-mounted 3-inch (76 mm)/50-caliber gun; Stern-mounted 4-inch (102 mm)/50-caliber gun; 2–8 × single 20-millimeter (0.79 in) Oerlikon anti-aircraft (AA) cannons and/or, 2–8 × 37-millimeter (1.46 in) M1 AA guns

SS Samvigna was a Liberty ship built in the United States during World War II. She was transferred to the British Ministry of War Transportation (MoWT) upon completion.

== Construction ==
Samvigna was laid down on 22 February 1944, under a United States Maritime Commission (MARCOM) contract, MC hull 2353, by J.A. Jones Construction, Brunswick, Georgia. It was sponsored by Mrs. Alexandra G. Brown, and launched on 8 April 1944.

== History ==
She was allocated to Hain Steamship, on 20 April 1944. On 30 June 1948, she was laid up in the National Defense Reserve Fleet, in Mobile, Alabama. She was sold to Southern Scrap Material Co., Ltd., 18 February 1960, for $70,150, for scrapping. She was removed from the fleet on 21 March 1960.

== Bibliography ==
- "Jones Construction, Brunswick GA". ShipbuildingHistory.com. 13 October 2010.
- "Liberty Ships – World War II".
- Maritime Administration. "Samvigna". Ship History Database Vessel Status Card. U.S. Department of Transportation, Maritime Administration. Archived from the original on 12 December 2019.
- Davies, James (May 2004). "Specifications (As-Built)" (PDF). p. 23.
- "SS Samvigna".
