= Samuel Johnson (Michigan politician) =

American politician (1839–1916)

Member of the Michigan House of Representatives from the Cass County district
- In office January 1, 1877 – 1880

Personal details
- Born: July 7, 1839 Springfield, New York, US
- Died: March 1, 1916 (aged 76) Wayne County, Michigan, US
- Party: Republican
- Education: Cazenovia Seminary

Samuel Johnson (July 7, 1839 – March 1, 1916) was a Michigan politician.

== Early life ==
Johnson was born on July 7, 1839, in Springfield, New York. Johnson attended Cazenovia Seminary in New York. Johnson moved to Michigan in 1864.

== Career ==
On November 7, 1876, Johnson was elected to the Michigan House of Representatives where he represented the Cass County district from January 3, 1877, to 1880. Johnson worked as a farmer and a teacher.
