= Samuel P. Jackson =

American musician

Samuel P. Jackson (February 5, 1818 in Manchester, England – July 27, 1885 in Brooklyn, New York, United States) was an American organist and composer. His father, James Jackson, was an organ builder; his family immigrated to the United States in 1825, where Samuel learned his father's trade. Jackson's music teachers were Moran (piano) and Thornton (harmonium). From 1830—42 he played the organ at St. Clement's Church; at St. Bartholomew from 1842–61; later at Christ Church, Church of the Ascension, and the Anthon Memorial Church. He was a well-known teacher of piano, organ, and harmonium. For many years he was music-proof reader to G. Schirmer, New York. Besides a variety of vocal sacred music, he published Gems for the Organ and four books of very popular Organ-Voluntaries.
