= Samuel Johnson (music producer) =

Samuel James Johnson is an Australian music producer and sound balance engineer who has worked with bands of many genres.

He works predominantly out of Three Phase studios in Melbourne, Australia.

== Discography ==
Year	Artist	Title	Role
2010	House Vs. Hurricane	Perspectives	Mixed
2010	Toe to Toe	Atturo Gatti	Produced/ Engineered/ Mixed
2010	At War With Gods	Nihilism	Produced/ Engineered/ Mixed
2010	Against	Heathen	Produced/ Engineered/ Mixed
2010	Arrows	Try and Stay Upright	Mixed
2010	The Gifthorse	Split 7'	Produced/ Engineered/ Mixed
2009	A Million Dead Birds Laughing	Force Fed Enlightenment	Produced/ Engineered/ Mixed
2009	50 Lions	Where Life Expires	Produced/ Engineered/ Mixed
2009	A Death in the Family	Small Town Stories	Produced/ Engineered/ Mixed
2009	Tenth Dan	Trapped Under Fire	Produced/ Engineered/ Mixed
2009	The Gifthorse	From the Floor Up	Produced/ Engineered/ Mixed
2009	Lead Sketch Union	Our Sea	Produced/ Engineered
2009	Driven Fear	Societies Finest	Produced/ Engineered/ Mixed
2009	Black is the Colour (band)	Black is the Colour	Produced/ Engineered/ Mixed
2009	No way out	Searching and Searching	Produced/ Engineered/ Mixed
2009	Anchors (band)	Anchors EP	Produced/ Engineered/ Mixed
2009	Identity Theft (band)	Masonic Youth	Produced/ Engineered/ Mixed
2008	Hatchet Dawn	Faith in Chaos	Produced/ Engineered/ Mixed
2008	Coue' Method	To Mock a Vapid World	Produced/ Engineered/ Mixed
2008	Arrows	Modern Art and Politics	Mixed
