= SS Samuel Johnston =

Liberty ship of WWII

History

United States
- Name: Samuel Johnston
- Namesake: Samuel Johnston
- Owner: War Shipping Administration (WSA)
- Operator: Eastern Steamship Co.
- Ordered: as type (EC2-S-C1) hull, MCE hull 46
- Awarded: 14 March 1941
- Builder: Bethlehem-Fairfield Shipyard, Baltimore, Maryland
- Cost: $1,046,847
- Yard number: 2033
- Way number: 7
- Laid down: 14 April 1942
- Launched: 14 June 1942
- Sponsored by: Miss Elaine Trimble
- Completed: 30 June 1942
- Identification: Call sign: KFOV
- Fate: Laid up in the National Defense Reserve Fleet, Wilmington, North Carolina, 27 September 1947; Sold for scrapping, 26 April 1967

General characteristics
- Class & type: Liberty ship; type EC2-S-C1, standard
- Tonnage: 10,865 LT DWT; 7,176 GRT
- Displacement: 3,380 long tons (3,434 t) (light); 14,245 long tons (14,474 t) (max)
- Length: 441 feet 6 inches (135 m) oa; 416 feet (127 m) pp; 427 feet (130 m) lwl
- Beam: 57 feet (17 m)
- Draft: 27 ft 9.25 in (8.4646 m)
- Installed power: 2 × Oil fired 450 °F (232 °C) boilers, operating at 220 psi (1,500 kPa); 2,500 hp (1,900 kW)
- Propulsion: 1 × triple-expansion steam engine, (manufactured by Worthington Pump & Machinery Corp, Harrison, New Jersey); 1 × screw propeller
- Speed: 11.5 knots (21.3 km/h; 13.2 mph)
- Capacity: 562,608 cubic feet (15,931 m^{3}) (grain); 499,573 cubic feet (14,146 m^{3}) (bale)
- Complement: 38–62 USMM; 21–40 USNAG
- Armament: Varied by ship; Bow-mounted 3-inch (76 mm)/50-caliber gun; Stern-mounted 4-inch (102 mm)/50-caliber gun; 2–8 × single 20-millimeter (0.79 in) Oerlikon anti-aircraft (AA) cannons and/or, 2–8 × 37-millimeter (1.46 in) M1 AA guns

SS Samuel Johnston was a Liberty ship built in the United States during World War II. She was named after Samuel Johnston, an American planter, lawyer, and statesman from Chowan County, North Carolina. He represented North Carolina in both the Continental Congress and the United States Senate, and was the sixth Governor of North Carolina.

== Construction ==
Samuel Johnston was laid down on 14 April 1942, under a Maritime Commission (MARCOM) contract, MCE hull 46, by the Bethlehem-Fairfield Shipyard, Baltimore, Maryland; she was sponsored by Miss Elaine Trimble, the daughter of Colonel South Trimble Jr., the Solicitor for the Department of Commerce, and was launched on 14 June 1942.

== History ==
She was allocated to Eastern Steamship Co., on 30 June 1942. On 27 September 1947, she was laid up in the National Defense Reserve Fleet, Wilmington, North Carolina. She was sold for scrapping on 24 March 1957, to Union Minerals & Alloys Corp., for $48,770. She was removed from the fleet, 26 April 1967.

== Bibliography ==
- "Bethlehem-Fairfield, Baltimore MD". www.ShipbuildingHistory.com. 14 August 2008.
- Maritime Administration. "Samuel Johnston". Ship History Database Vessel Status Card. U.S. Department of Transportation, Maritime Administration.
- Davies, James (May 2004). "Specifications (As-Built)" (PDF). p. 23.
- "SS Samuel Johnston".
