= Sammy Johnson (defensive back) =

American football player (born 1960)

No. 45
- Position: Defensive back

Personal information
- Born: November 25, 1960 (age 65); Reading, Pennsylvania, U.S.
- Listed height: 6 ft 0 in (1.83 m)
- Listed weight: 185 lb (84 kg)

Career information
- High school: Fork Union Military Academy
- College: North Carolina (1979–1982)
- NFL draft: 1983: undrafted

Career history
- Philadelphia Stars (1983); Philadelphia Stars (1984)*
- * Offseason or practice squad member only

Samuel Bernard Johnson (born November 25, 1960) is an American former football defensive back. He played college football at the University of North Carolina, and was a member of the Philadelphia Stars of the United States Football League (USFL).

== Early life and college ==
Samuel Bernard Johnson was born on November 25, 1960, in Reading, Pennsylvania. He attended Fork Union Military Academy in Fork Union, Virginia.

Johnson was a four-year letterman for the North Carolina Tar Heels of the University of North Carolina from 1979 to 1982. He recorded one interception in 1980, one interception in 1981, and one interception in 1982.

== Professional career ==
On January 4, 1983, Johnson was a territorial selection of the Philadelphia Stars of the United States Football League (USFL) in the 1983 USFL draft. He signed with the team on February 2, 1983. He was released on March 15, 1983, after the Stars' second regular season game.

On December 5, 1983, Johnson re-signed with the Stars for the 1984 USFL season. However, he was later released on January 30, 1984.
