= Australian heavy metal =

Australian musical genre

Australian heavy metal music has its roots in both the Australian hard rock and pub rock tradition of the 1970s and the American and British heavy metal scenes. Since the mid-1980s, Australian heavy metal has been particularly influenced by foreign bands, particularly Swedish death metal, American thrash metal and black metal from Norway. Within Australia heavy metal has always remained part of the underground but since the mid-1990s many Australian metal acts have found widespread acceptance in overseas markets, particularly in Europe.

== History ==
AC/DC is often cited as being Australia's foremost hard rock band. AC/DC's influence on metal is quite clear however, with a style built around a predominately loud, heavy riffing guitar sound. With regard to heavy metal, Sydney band Buffalo could well be considered one of the country's first exponents of the style. Originally formed under the name Head in 1967, Buffalo began playing a very similar style to that of Black Sabbath from 1970. The band was the first non-British act to be signed to Vertigo and released three albums with them between 1972 and 1975 but never found mainstream success in Australia. The group's bass guitarist Peter Wells formed Rose Tattoo in 1976, another band often cited as laying a cornerstone for Australian metal. Like Buffalo, Rose Tattoo's music was ignored by Australian radio while building a strong cult following internationally. Conversely, The Angels always courted commercial success in Australia while finding progress tougher overseas. The Angels were probably closer to metal than Rose Tattoo, with the albums Night Attack, Watch The Red and Two Minute Warning harbouring a distinctly heavy metal sound, yet while all three charted highly (Two Minute Warning peaked at No. 2), none of their singles reached higher than No. 21 ("Stand Up", 1982). The Angels were rarely referred to as a heavy metal band in Australia however, and in the modern context would possibly not now be considered one.

Without support from radio airplay even well-established foreign metal bands found little success on the Australian singles charts until the last half of the 1980s. Albums, significantly those of Iron Maiden, occasionally charted highly however, and Iron Maiden and Twisted Sister were two of the few foreign metal bands to conduct Australian tours in the first half of that decade. In spite of this, metal music had a large underground following, with small independent retailers like Sydney's Utopia Import Records catering for the audience. Utopia was established in 1978 by record collector John Cotter who began trading metal and punk albums that were generally not given release in Australia and by the early 1980s was the country's best known retailer of heavy metal music.

Inspired by the new wave of British heavy metal, a small raft of bands had begun to emerge that would form the foundations of the modern Australian heavy metal scene. Some of the better known groups from this time included Taipan, Saracen, Virgin Soldiers, Prowler (who would soon change their name to Taramis), Black Jack, Wolf, Nothing Sacred, Rosanas Raiders, Axatak, Almost Human, Egypt (later to become Venom, in Sydney), Tyrant and Bengal Tigers. In the 90s WOLF emerged with a female lead vocalist this was something new to the Melbourne metal scene. Their style of music was similar to Ritchie Blackmore's Rainbow. The band gigged regularly across Melbourne and Sydney. The lead singer was killed in a motorcycle accident.

Bengal Tigers formed in Melbourne in 1979 and by 1982 had been signed to Mushroom Records, releasing an EP called Metal Fetish, although neither this release nor two later singles met with much success. The band released another EP in 1995, entitled Pain Clinic, and an album in 1997, called In the Blood. Saracen was a Perth band that had formed in 1980. When guitarist John Meyer joined Rose Tattoo in 1983, Saracen replaced him with Jamie Page and changed its name to Trilogy, releasing two albums (the second of which was recorded after Meyer returned, and issued under the Saracen name). Axatak, who adopted a leather and hair look similar to the early LA glam metal scene and Taipan also released albums or EPs but all of these were generally passed over by the mainstream Australian music scene. Almost Human was an Adelaide band that formed in the late 1970s playing covers before introducing original material. As one of that city's most prominent heavy bands they supported touring groups like Whitesnake, Sweet, Slade and others and eventually released a self-financed single. Guitarist Chris Tennant went on to achieve some success with The Superjesus during the 1990s and other members went on to play in bands like Heaven and BB Steal.

Other bands were somewhat more successful, though success was fleeting. Boss had formed in Adelaide in 1979 and after moving to Sydney built up a following on the pub circuit, eventually signing to RCA Records for worldwide release in 1983. The album was moderately successful in Europe and the group supported Iron Maiden, Twisted Sister and Dio but disbanded after a US tour, reforming a brief time later under the name BB Steal, a band that still exists to the present time. In Melbourne, BlackJack forming in 1979 and hoisting their jolly roger flag, they released material (on a now defunct label associated with a local metal music shop '83+'85) that showcased a distinctive blend of NWOBHM classical and power metal with undertones of doom metal.

The Melbourne heavy metal scene at this time was still very underground, and was supported by a handful of metal music shows on community radio stations, especially 3PBS and 3RRR. Local announcers included Allan Thomas who hosted the Metal for Melbourne show on 3RRR for a number of years between the mid-1980s and 1990, and was a prominent, influential, and controversial figure in the local metal scene.

Heaven formed in Sydney out of an Adelaide band called Fat Lip in 1980 and became a second-tier attraction in the US on the strength of their second album, touring widely and opening for the likes of Judas Priest, Kiss and Mötley Crüe before eventually imploding in 1985. Vice was a glam metal band from Brisbane who had formed in early 1984. They became one of the city's most prominent acts, releasing an EP and two albums, undertaking interstate tours and also supporting international acts such as Sweet and Stryper.

The Tasmanian scene was non-existent except for one genuine metal act, Tyrant that formed in 1983, releasing a 4-track cassette titled "Never Too Loud" which topped the local metal charts and peaking at No. 7 at Melbourne's Central Station records. Tyrant re-located to Sydney in 1985, quickly establishing themselves and headlining the first Metal Crusade at the Coogee Bay Hotel on a line-up that also included Bengal Tigers, Shy Thunder, Statez and Vice before 1,800 people. Despite good reviews in both RAM and Juke magazines, not to mention a strong fan base, a record deal never eventuated and the group disbanded in late 1986. Over the next decade Tyrant played only a handful of shows, reforming in 1999 and have released 3 albums to date, Freaks of Nature, Thunder Down Under and Live Bootleg. Tyrant still exists today with singer Neil 'Steel' Wilson being the only original member with a 25th Anniversary CD currently being recorded.

By the mid-1980s, music by American thrash bands like Metallica and Slayer had begun to filter through the local metal community and a group of newer bands started to appear that adopted similar styles. Arguably the earliest of these was Melbourne's Nothing Sacred, although other Melbourne bands like Renegade, Tyrus, Rampage, Mass Confusion, and Slaughter Lord from Sydney would soon also emerge. The most prominent early thrash acts, however, were Sydney's Mortal Sin and Melbourne's Hobbs' Angel of Death. Mortal Sin had been formed in late 1985 by drummer Wayne Campbell and singer Mat Maurer out of a more traditional-styled band called Wizzard and within six months had recorded Mayhemic Destruction. Originally meant as a demo, the group released it as an album in early 1987 and were soon signed internationally to Vertigo, before long becoming Australia's highest-profile metal band by supporting Metallica on a national tour and later heading overseas to tour Europe and the US. Hobbs' Angel of Death had begun as a solo project for Tyrus guitarist Peter Hobbs. After recording a series of demos with assistance from members of Nothing Sacred, Hobbs found interest in the project from German label Steamhammer who released the album Hobbs' Angel of Death in 1988. Armoured Angel had formed in Canberra in 1984 and released their debut demo tape Baptism in Blood the following year. Another band, Sadistik Exekution, had formed in Sydney in 1986. Solidifying its line-up by 1989 the group soon became an influence among both the local and foreign underground metal scenes for their chaotic death metal style and nihilistic behaviour.

== 1990–1995 ==
Misery at Metal for the Brain, 1993

The worldwide success of Metallica and the explosion of the hair metal scene in the US in the late 1980s had raised the level of interest in heavy metal music in Australia by the early 1990s but for the most part it was still primarily an underground scene.

A changing of the guard was also becoming evident. Mortal Sin had fizzled out after a US tour and while a new line-up had toured with Megadeth and recorded an album it was quickly forgotten. Hobbs' Angel of Death had really only existed as a studio band and virtually all the early bands except Armoured Angel and Sydney's Addictive had drifted apart. Both of these groups had just entered their most successful periods. Armoured Angel had formed in Canberra in 1984 as a five-piece band before becoming a trio after an early demo recording. Developing a dense and very heavy style, they are often named as Australia's first major death metal band. Staying together until 1996, they came as close as any Australian metal band to attaining widescale success during this period, playing at the Big Day Out on two occasions, touring Europe and having their two EPs distributed by Polygram Records. Addictive, who had been touted by Mortal Sin's Mat Maurer as the country's next big thrash act in a 1989 issue of Hot Metal magazine, had formed in 1988. Heavily influenced by Sacred Reich and Nuclear Assault, their first album, Pity of Man, had won European release, had headlined an event at Sydney's Hordern Pavilion called MetalFest with Motörhead and by 1991 was recording a follow-up album with Bob Daisley. Daisley is one of Australia's best-known metal musicians, having featured in Rainbow, Uriah Heep, Black Sabbath and Ozzy Osbourne's band and by 1990 had played on more than 20 albums with 11 different artists. The resultant release Kick 'em Hard was plagued with problems, however, and Addictive faded away before splitting up in 1996. Sydney death metal group Sinus were also experiencing success at this stage, although ultimately they would only put out one release, splitting up just before releasing their highly anticipated sophomore recording, Dead Kids EP.

Death and black metal bands from America, Sweden and Norway were now having a major influence, and slightly later in the decade the more aggressive stylings of Pantera and Sepultura began to win fans away from old guard acts like Metallica and Megadeth who were seen by many to have mellowed since their earlier recordings. The Sydney-based Hot Metal magazine, a glossy monthly that had first appeared in 1988, was the first Australian publication devoted to heavy metal and gave considerable coverage to local acts. By the early 1990s it had attained widespread mainstream circulation throughout the country and helped to introduce new audiences to metal music, and established fans to new bands, especially new Australian acts.

In 1990, youth broadcaster Triple J introduced the heavy music program 3 Hours of Power to its formatting. Originally hosted by Helen Razer, then Francis Leach and, from 1998, by Costa Zouliou, the show began to gradually introduce more and more Australian acts into its playlists, although it wasn't until late in Leach's tenure with the show did it begin to move away from heavier alternative music towards a clearly metal focus. Three compilation albums featuring music featured on the show eventually appeared, titled Eleven (after the Spinal Tap philosophy that all guitar amps should go to 11), This is Twelve and Thirteen.

One of the other great boons to Australian heavy metal music was the Metal for the Brain festival. Established by Armoured Angel's drummer Joel Green to raise funds for a friend severely brain-damaged after an assault, the first concert in 1991 featured six Canberra bands in the afternoon with a later performance by some punk bands including the Hard Ons. By the end of the decade, the event had stretched out to a 12-hour festival featuring 18 groups from around the country and by 2000 was so big it was forced to move to a larger venue. When the final Metal for the Brain festival closed in November 2006, more than 100 different bands from every major centre in Australia and several from overseas including Voivod had appeared at some time. Many bands considered it to be one of the pinnacles of their achievements.

During the early 1990s, the influence of American and Swedish death metal bands was quickly evident. Many of the thrash bands of the 1980s had disbanded and heavier groups were beginning to fill the void, such as Necrotomy, Acheron, Disembowlment, Corpse Molestation, Damnatory, Hecatomb, Damaged, Scourge, Anatomy and Blood Duster in Melbourne, Dreamkillers, Obfuscate Mass, Misery and Mausoleum in Brisbane, Aftermath, Apostasy and Cruciform from Sydney and Psychrist and Alchemist from Canberra. Perhaps due to magazines like Hot Metal and the occasional exposure to extreme metal on some community radio programs, bands like these were appearing at a high rate. Shock Records, the Melbourne independent label, commissioned a compilation album to highlight some of these new acts. Come to Daddy was released in 1992 and compiled by Hot Metal writer Ian McFarlane; it contained 14 tracks from bands like Necrotomy, Mausoleum, Mystic Insight, Deracination, Obfuscate Mass, Misery, Discarnated, Entasis, iNFeCTeD, Open Festering Wounds, and Persecution. When McFarlane went to Roadrunner Records' Australian office the following year, he put together another compilation, Redrum, collecting tracks from another group of completely different bands like Alchemist, Sadistik Exekution, Frozen Doberman, Allegiance and Hecatomb.

The first group from this period to attain some prominence was Mortification, a Melbourne Christian metal band that had evolved out of a 1980s thrash group called Light Force. Having already established some international links from that time, Mortification was signed internationally by Nuclear Blast almost immediately, becoming the first Australian band to be carried by the German metal-specialist label. Another Melbourne act establishing a legacy was diSEMBOWELMENT, a studio bound band that was developing a unique blend of slow and heavy doom mixed with ambience and combined with death metal and grindcore. A demo found the attention of Relapse Records who released the Transcendence Into The Peripheral album in 1993. Other Melbourne groups like Scourge, Damaged and Blood Duster were also becoming established. Scourge formed in 1989, and released the 3/4's Cut C.D/E.P on Girls Toilet Records in 1991, and later released a 7" single Phoenix/Tastechaser on Death Valley records in 1994. Scourge created a blend of metal, grunge & thrash. Damaged, who had formed in Ballarat in 1989, played violently extreme music that combined death and black metal and grindcore with a hardcore element and Blood Duster mixed thirty-second grind songs with larrikinism and loutish humour. The notorious Sadistik Exekution had finally released an album, The Magus, in 1991 but their levels of extremity were rivalled by Melbourne band Corpse Molestation. By 1993 the latter had become known as a black/war metal band and changed its name to Bestial Warlust. After two albums, the group splintered apart but various members continued in a similar vein in other acts including Deströyer 666, Abominator and Gospel of the Horns.

By 1993, Armoured Angel had achieved some overseas success and with their EP "Stigmartyr" being distributed nationally by Polygram had been added to the bill of the Big Day Out. In Perth, a thrash band called Allegiance had begun to win notice after a string of demos. In 1993 they were signed, also by Polygram, and released the album D.e.s.t.i.t.u.t.i.o.n. the following year which was supported by a national tour with Sydney hard rock band The Poor. By 1995, Allegiance had toured nationally with the Big Day Out and supported bands like Slayer, Machine Head and Fight, whose singer Rob Halford expressed managerial interest. Problems befell the group after this point however and the second album was long delayed.

== Mid-1990s–1999 ==
By the middle of the decade, the Australian heavy metal music scene was a well-established underground culture. Small metal labels like Modern Invasion in Melbourne and Warhead Records in Sydney were strong supporters of local acts and both cities had particularly flourishing live metal circuits with established venues for bands to play. The smaller centres also harboured well-developed metal scenes, although Brisbane and particularly Perth were cut off from the growing south-east coast touring circuit by immense distances, for this reason Perth band Epitaph made the relocation to Sydney after being signed to Warhead Records. Nevertheless, Australian metal bands were receiving more media coverage than ever before. As more local releases appeared, more were being added to the playlists of community radio and to 3 Hours of Power, and a second magazine with a metal focus had started to circulate. Hot Metal had become simply HM in the early 1990s in order to widen its coverage to include other alternative music styles in the wake of grunge and many metal fans had expressed a belief that the magazine no longer catered to their tastes. An offshoot of Sydney street paper On the Street, Rebel Razor was launched at the Alternative Nation Festival in 1995. Produced on news print at a cheaper cost than HM, Rebel Razor did not cover metal exclusively either but it had a more prominent local focus.

The same year, however, Sydney's live metal scene suffered a series of blows when several venues closed down. The Lewisham Hotel in the inner western suburbs, which as The Haunted Castle had hosted metal gigs up to four nights a week since the early 1990s, decided to close its doors to metal bands after a series of vandalism incidents. The other premier venue was the Phoenician Club on Broadway in the inner city, which also hosted regular metal events including shows by international touring acts; the building's history as a live music venue dated back to the early 1970s when groups like AC/DC had played there. On 21 October 1995, however, the club hosted a dance party known as a rave, attended by 15-year-old Anna Wood who died three days later after taking ecstasy there. During the resultant investigation, the Phoenician Club's entertainment license was withdrawn and with the closure of another two venues shortly afterward—including the Cobra Club at the Parramatta Hotel which had been a key venue for every type of band from hair metal to thrash—the live heavy metal scene in Sydney almost came to a standstill. The Lewisham Hotel has since begun hosting metal gigs once more, although not as frequently. The old Phoenician Club building was eventually demolished in 2006 to make way for a residential precinct, and the Parramatta Hotel was similarly removed in 2003 and the site is now part of the enormous Westfield shopping complex.

Regardless of these closures, a steady stream of bands were beginning to develop considerable profiles. Alchemist, who had formed in Canberra in 1987, had finally refined its unique style that comprised elements of death metal, grindcore, surf rock and psychedelia. A track from their second album, Lunasphere, had been included on one of the 3 Hours of Power compilations and the group played at the 1996 Sydney Big Day Out. In Sydney, the symphonic black metal band Lord Kaos were filling the gap that had been left by the dissolution of Bestial Warlust, and a core group of bands like Mortality, Cryogenic and Segression were proving that there was more to the local scene than just death metal. Death metal was the focus of Brisbane's scene, however, headed by Misery who had formed in 1992 and featuring others like Sakkuth and Killengod. A developing melodic metal/power metal scene led by Hyperion but also including groups like Apparition, Pegazus, Vanishing Point and Eyefear were starting to appear in the always diverse Melbourne. In Perth, isolation was a serious problem. Both Allegiance and iNFeCTeD, a death metal band that had released two albums on Shock, had self-destructed not long after returning from expensive east coast tours.

As the Sydney live metal scene began to recover with some new venues replacing those lost the year before, Rebel Razor ceased publication after the 24th issue in June 1996. Shortly afterward, Pacific Publications announced that HM was also being shut down. Several HM staff members including editor Jeremy Sheaffe then set up their own publishing house and produced the first issue of Loudmouth magazine in April 1997. By this time, nu metal had begun to have a strong influence over the domestic metal scene, with several of the more established metal acts taking aspects of that sound into their own, or shifting toward it completely. Superheist, a Melbourne group that had formed in the early part of the decade as a grindcore band, had re-invented themselves as a pop-laced nu metal act and before long was one of Shock's major bands with their songs being played on TV shows and added to mainstream compilation albums. Segression had begun to head in the same direction with their second album, Fifth of the Fifth, and by the time of their third release were well established as a nu metal band. Canberra band Henry's Anger had started out playing a dark alternative metal style similar to Tool but by 1997 they too were exploring a nu metal sound and by 1999 they were on the verge of a major breakthrough when their second album, Personality Test, was nominated for an ARIA Award in the Best Album Category. Another group was a Messiah from the Gold Coast. Formed in 1997 and with an 11-year-old drummer, the band created such a positive vibe that before long they had been signed to Sony and become Sunk Loto, a group who would have a serious mid-level career in the first part of the next decade.

== 2000s ==
=== 2000–2004 ===
Despite the closure of Warhead Records and Loudmouth magazine, by 2000 Australian heavy metal was thriving like never before. By the end of that year the scene was much different from the one that had existed at the beginning of the previous decade. Many of the bands were beginning to be noticed beyond the underground by other sections of the industry and quite a few were establishing names overseas. Pegazus, a Melbourne power metal band that had formed at the beginning of the 1990s, had become only the second Australian group after Mortification to find themselves attached to Nuclear Blast Records. In 1998 they also became the first Australian act to appear at Germany's prestigious Wacken Open Air Festival. Another Melbourne melodic metal band, Vanishing Point, became the second in 2000. The Berzerker, yet another Melbourne group, also appeared on the international scene when its self-titled debut album became the first release from an Australian band on the British extreme music label Earache Records. Members of The Berzerker included the guitarists from Melbourne thrash metal band The Wolves, who had impacted the Melbourne and Australian scene from 1998 to 2002 and were signed to Dark Carnival Records, a subsidiary label of Roadrunner Records. The Wolves played The Big Day Out in 2000 and supported Slipknot on 12 February 2000 at Festival Hall before ultimately disbanding without any formal release. Deströyer 666, a thrash band that had been formed by former Bestial Warlust guitarist KK Warslut, was another act developing a foreign profile, touring Europe (and eventually moving there in 2001) and linking up with French Season of Mist label. Earlier in the year, Alchemist, Cryogenic and a Sydney thrash band called Psi.Kore had staged a large-scale tour billed as "World War Three". Backed by Triple J's 3 Hours of Power program, Utopia Import Records and Sydney record label Chatterbox Records, to whom two of the bands were signed, it was the first tour of its kind to feature Australian metal bands exclusively, and visited all the east coast state capitals and several regional centres. The Metal for the Brain festival had now become so large that the organisers had found it necessary to find a larger venue for it, moving the event from the Australian National University to the University of Canberra. Thirty bands played that year, with Canadian group Voivod becoming the first foreign act to appear at the festival. For the first time, the event attracted publicity from the mainstream media, with the Weekend Australian including a feature story on it in its colour magazine several weeks later. Just over a year before, on 26 September 1999, The Sun Herald had included a feature article on Australian metal in its Sunday Life! supplement. It was perhaps the first story of its kind in a major Australian daily newspaper. In terms of other media, Andrew Haug had taken over from Costa Zouliou on 3 Hours of Power in 2001. Haug, who had previously presented a heavy metal program on Melbourne community station 3RRR, is also Century Media's Australian label rep and the drummer for a band called Contrive and under his direction the show began featuring more Australian metal than ever before. Soon after his tenure began, however, programming reshuffles at Triple J caused the show to be reduced by an hour and was renamed Full Metal Racket. A monthly glossy magazine catering to the metal audience had not existed since Loudmouth had wound up in 1998 but in 2001 the Sydney office of EMAP Publications began producing a local version of its long-running British magazine Kerrang!, although it failed to provide the kind of coverage of Australian metal found in previous magazines.

More bands were bolstering the scene's increasingly healthier status and diversifying its fanbase. Brisbane band Astriaal had formed in 1998 and since then had bucked the trend for black metal bands to remain mysterious and play live rarely or never. The group had released three EPs through Brisbane label Dissident by 2002, headlined Metal for the Brain and toured regularly. One band developing a profile was Psi.Kore, who had formed in 1996. They had been on the "World War Three" tour and, their self-titled EP was a best-seller. By going on to support Cradle of Filth and Megadeth, Psi.Kore was on the verge of further success but split in 2002, with most of the band forming Daysend who would have a similar ascent. Brisbane band Devolved had attracted attention with a militaristic death metal style and at the end of 2001 were voted Australian Metal Band of the Year by Triple J. The following year they toured Europe and eventually moved to the US in 2005. Chalice was an Adelaide band who had won wide acceptance with a symphonic Gothic metal, a style that was gaining popularity but had few local exponents. The rise of Swedish melodic death metal had also spawned Australian practitioners such as Infernal Method, a Sydney band that had formed out of the remnants of Deadspawn. At one time featuring a former member of Dimmu Borgir, Infernal Method quickly established themselves as perhaps the best-known local band playing the style, but constant personnel reshuffles kept them from releasing anything more than a demo. Nu metal acts like Superheist and Sunk Loto were doing strongly, enjoying radio airplay and playing regularly at festival events. The pressure of further success weighed heavily on both acts however. At the end of 2001, Sunk Loto virtually disappeared for almost two years and Superheist self-destructed at the end of 2003.

Other bands made significant comebacks. Scourge reformed after a 4-year hiatus, and released "Incinerator" a 4 track E.P/C.D on Spooky Records. And an album named "4 BETTER OR WORSE" was recorded by Scourge during 2000–2001, yet it was never released. Scourge played their final show in 2001. The original recordings have been found recently after being missing for 17 years, and were finally completed & released in 2026. Damaged had gone through a tumultuous history and by early 1999 was down to only two members. Late in 2000, however, the group had returned with a new vocalist, Brutal Truth's Kevin Sharp, a new bass player Eddie Lacey from thrash metal band, The Wolves, and a new album. A national tour followed, but Sharp's association with the group would be brief. Eddie Lacey was also to depart the band. Three years later, Damaged returned once more but their always volatile personal relationships ended them for good within twelve months. Hobbs Angel of Death and Mortal Sin also returned. Peter Hobbs had rebuilt his band in 2002 and released an album of his early demos a few months later. In December 2003, the band played Metal for the Brain and featured at Wacken in mid-2004. Mortal Sin had reformed once before, in the mid-1990s, but split up again within two years. By late 2003, however, the group had once again reunited and before long had recorded a live DVD and begun writing material for a new album. They went on to play Wacken in 2006.

=== 2005–present ===
By the middle of the decade, nu metal had all but disappeared from the heavy metal landscape and metalcore had taken its place among the more traditional forms of metal. Bands like Parkway Drive from Byron Bay and I Killed the Prom Queen from Adelaide had previously been seen as part of the hardcore scene but were finding their audience beginning to crossover as the definition between hardcore and metal became increasingly blurred. While they often found themselves to be alienated by fans of more traditional metal, these bands were soon being touted as Australia's most prominent metal groups and both had established credible followings internationally before I Killed the Prom Queen abruptly split up in early 2007. Things did not turn out so well for Sunk Loto, who had switched to an aggressive metalcore style on their second album, Between Birth and Death, only to find little acceptance for it from more established fans and a difficulty attracting new ones, and the band broke up acrimoniously in mid-2007. Other bands with metal backgrounds like Daysend developed a deliberately metalcore style and found immediate acceptance. Within three years of forming in 2002 the band had toured constantly and opened for a range of foreign acts before heading to the US on a six-week tour in 2005. Kev Freiberg, of Lorna Slavin's east-coast tour date fame, cites Sydney band Sinus as being a major influence on Slavin's "hot metal" sound, in particular the bass playing of Sinus's Dean Eastwood.

It was not just Australia's metalcore contingent that was breaking into overseas markets. Alchemist, who had long sustained a dedicated cult-level foreign following, finally broke through in the middle of the decade and toured Europe in late 2004. The Berzerker was by now well established at an international level and had supported their first three albums with lengthy tours across Europe and North America. A technical death metal band from Hobart called Psycroptic was also making inroads beyond Australian shores. The band undertook a European tour in 2004 after the release of their second album and by the middle of 2006 had signed to French label Neurotic, before touring Europe once more. Blood Duster also toured Europe in June 2005. At one point, the bands found themselves playing at the same venue on concurrent nights, possibly the first time such a thing had happened in Australian metal history. Blood Duster had toured with the Big Day Out the year before, the first domestic metal band to play at every show since Allegiance ten years previously, and had even attained the rare distinction of having a song featured in a TV commercial. In 2008, Truth Corroded became the first Australian band to tour China, with Contrive becoming the first Australian metal group to tour Thailand following in 2009. In 2010, Australian metal upstarts Universum bridged gaps between Australian underground metal scenes and European markets with the collaboration of prominent metal figures on their 'Mortuus Machina' release. Featuring members from Scar Symmetry, Soilwork, MyGrain, Nightrage and Mors Principium Est, Universum have taken a major step forward in bringing attention to Australia's metal scene.

An increasingly popular export, the latter half of the 2000s has seen a marked increase in the number of Black Metal artists achieving high distinction and domestic and international success. In the footsteps of the highly successful Destroyer 666 and Gospel of the Horns, Melbourne bands Adamus Exul and Order of Orias have achieved critical acclaim in recent years in the Americas and Europe respectively, achieving collaborative signings with Misanthropic Spirit Records (Argentina) and Obscure Abhorrence Productions (Ger.) for upcoming full-length releases.

In spite of such successes, Australian heavy metal continues to remain a fringe underground culture still widely ignored by the mainstream industry and media. When it was announced in mid-2006 that the annual Metal for the Brain festival would be no more after a final event on 4 November, no regular news service outside of Canberra carried word of it, even though it had often attracted up to 3000 people and had been running as long as the Big Day Out. In an interview with Australian metal webzine HailMetal.com, festival director Adam Agius suggested the festival would return in 2008; this now seems unlikely.

On 7 November 2009, the Australian Metal Awards were held in Sydney. The event was billed as part concert and part awards show featuring Sadistik Exekution's first performance in ten years, along with a host of other leading Australian metal bands. Psycroptic (6 awards) and Chaos Divine (5 awards including 'Band of the Year') dominated proceedings. This was the third such attempt at an awards event for the local metal scene. Previously, one such awards night had been tied to Metal for the Brain in 2005 and there was an even earlier attempt hosted in Melbourne during the mid-1990s.

Australian heavy metal music has established itself as an important part of the wider Australian music industry, and many of the bands involved in it continue to be signed to foreign labels and build international fanbases.

In August 2014, a long-awaited documentary series examining the history of Australian heavy metal is being released called Metal Down Under. Funded through various crowdfunding campaigns, this 165-minute film covers bands such as Nothing Sacred, Renegade, Hobbs Angel of Death, Mortal Sin, Allegiance, Alchemist, Damaged, Manticore, Mortification, Sadistik Exekution, Segressions, Frankenbok, Dreadnaught, Psycroptic, Ne Obliviscaris, King Parrot and more.

Australian progressive metal band Ne Obliviscaris have become notable for their use of Patreon crowdfunding, which has enabled them to tour extensively.

In the 2020s, 1980s-era bands such as the Bengal Tigers and Nothing Sacred have enjoyed a resurgence, with the former touring Europe for the first time in 2024 and releasing Cry Havoc, their first full-length album in 27 years, in August 2025. Nothing Sacred, meanwhile, remained busy throughout the pandemic, releasing No Gods, their first full-length album in 33 years, and touring Europe in 2024.

== Online media ==
Starting in 1995, the first website devoted to Australian heavy metal coverage was launched by Sydney-based site Ausmetal, which featured biographies, reviews, music samples and a gig guide. It was first introduced a larger audience 'offline' at the Metal for the Brain festival that year. Western Front began in 1996, and since 2009 this has been expanded to cover a local awards night for WA heavy metal bands. Other online coverage of Australian heavy metal was founded by Sydney-based sites Hail Metal and Pyro Music who provided regular reviews and interviews from the local and international scene.

In 2008, Metal Obsession entered the market offering extensive news, reviews, interviews and gig guide for all states of Australia and New Zealand. Metal Obsession received an Australian Metal Award in 2009 for best Metal Fan/Web/Magazine. Metal as Fuck also offer updates of Australian metal in a global context: It was the first Australian metal press to be granted access to major European festivals from its earliest years. The Aus Metal Gig Guide also provides a decent contributor based gig listing.

== Record labels ==
Few Australian record labels have specialised in heavy metal, and even fewer have focused solely on Australian heavy metal. Two of the best known are Melbourne's Modern Invasion Music and Sydney's now defunct Warhead Records. Daniel Janecka began Modern Invasion by managing bands like Hobbs Angel of Death and distributing early Norwegian black metal albums before releasing the first Bestial Warlust album in 1994. Since then the label has maintained its distribution service along with its own roster and now carries acts that include Chalice, Deströyer 666, Long Voyage Back and former Sadistik Exekution guitarist Rev. Kriss Hades, along with a selection of overseas bands and a small number of non-metal bands.

Brad Sims established Warhead Records by selling demos from local groups and CDs by underground foreign bands. In 1993 Warhead then issued the EP Atavism by Sydney doom band Cruciform followed by Fear of the Future from teenage thrash group Neophobia. Expanding to a store called the Hammerhouse in Parramatta in Sydney's west, the business traded in metal exclusively while the label released only Australian artists, by far the most successful at the local level being Cryogenic who went on to do a small scale European tour in 1998. Warhead eventually disappeared in early 2000 and none of the bands attached to it still exist although several have formed the core of other groups currently at the forefront of the scene, including Daysend.

Melbourne enterprise Metal Warriors and Samson Productions is another label dedicated to heavy metal music. Run by Steve Ravic, Metal Warriors has produced several compilations on VHS and DVD and managed and released music by Dungeon, Pegazus and Vanishing Point among others, however Ravic has been concentrating his efforts on film making in recent years.

Prime Cuts is a Perth label handling a range of metal bands from that city . Started by metal musicians Glen Dyson and Brad Wesson in 2002, the company has since expanded to incorporate the promotions and touring arm Soundworks Entertainment which in the last few years has conducted numerous Australian tours by foreign bands. In late 2007, this label released A Blaze in the Southern Skies, a double CD of metal music by Australian and New Zealand artists. The label's roster is now quite extensive and includes bands from all over Australia.

The Coffins Slave in Sydney, is mainly a distribution label that deals in vinyl although they do carry CDs and have a small roster of signed bands from Australia and overseas. The label works with exclusive distribution deals from [Dark Descent Records] [Svart Records] [Cruz del Sur Music] carrying titles ranging from Black metal, Thrash, NWOBHM, Doom, and so on. They also run a yearly festival in Sydney called Evil Invaders and a heavy metal nightclub Killed by Death!

Truth Inc. is an Adelaide-based metal label run by members of long-standing acts Truth Corroded and Double Dragon. The labels current roster includes Double Dragon, Truth Corroded, Black Like Vengeance, Closed Casket, A Red Dawn, Separatist, The Omen and Lynchmada.

Faultline Records is another Melbourne company with a heavy metal focus. Set up in 2004 by DW Norton of Superheist, the label's current roster includes Daysend, the hard rock band Head Inc. and mathcore group Five Star Prison Cell.

White Noise Productions have been a forerunner in the establishment of a regulated and competitive schedule of live events accommodating the more obscure and extreme underground metal artists across Australia, including hosting the annual 'Hellraiser' festival, catering to artists such as Canberra's Alchemist, Mephistopheles and Be'lakor, prior to their appearance at 2010's 'Summer Breeze' festival in Germany.

The Wollongong-based Riot! Entertainment began as primarily a distribution label, acting as the Australian agent for such foreign companies as Nuclear Blast, Relapse, Earache, Metal Blade and SPV among others. In recent years the label has directly signed a number of local and foreign metal acts including Universum, Ace Frehley, Stuck Mojo, Fozzy, Paindivision, Mortal Sin, Arcane, Be'lakor, The Poor and more.

Sydney label Grindhead Records was established in the early 2000s (decade) by the vocalist of grindcore band Ebolie to release not only his own albums but those from other groups, mostly other Sydney grind and brutal death metal acts. The label has since released a wider range of extreme styles including doom and sludge bands as well as a few international releases and has been running two all day festivals: Slaughterfest, which showcases a mixed line up of Death, Grindcore and Doom bands and East West Death Grind Fest which focuses mainly on Brutal Death Metal and Grindcore bands. Another label specialising in grind is Melbourne's No Escape, set up by two members of Fuck... I'm Dead and releasing both local and international grind and death bands.

Obsidian Records is Brisbane label dealing with extreme acts from the state.

Several smaller and even more underground metal labels also emerged during the 1990s, including Dissident, now based in London, which released albums by Astriaal and Psychrist, and the short-lived Venomous, who briefly handled Misery.

Local metal releases are not the sole domain of small, metal-specific underground labels however. Melbourne independent Shock Records established a subsidiary arm called Thrust in the early 1990s to handle releases by Abramelin and Alchemist. Alchemist is now attached to Chatterbox Records, a Sydney label with a wide repertoire of artists that has previously released albums by other metal bands like Daysend and Henry's Anger. Traditionally, major labels have had little interest in Australian metal acts, although there has been notable exceptions. Allegiance and Mortal Sin, for example, were attached to Polygram (who also handled distribution for Armoured Angel's early releases), and Boss and a Perth band called Black Alice were signed to RCA in the early 1980s.

In 2006 Animus Industries released a mixed bag of nu-metal, hardcore and hard rock music videos on a DVD called 'Broken' including: The Butterfly Effect, Karnivool, The Mark of Cain, .hinge, Nokturnl, Side Effect X, Greyn, Sick Puppies, No Grace and A Darker Shade. Also included are: Chton, Keep of Kalessin and Forty-Two direct from the Norwegian underground scene of Hardcore and Metal.

== See also ==
- Music of Australia
- Australian thrash metal
