= Australian thrash metal =

Australian music scene

Australian thrash metal is a regional scene of thrash metal music that originated during the late 1980s.

While not considered a "major" part of the worldwide thrash metal scene due to distance from the major Bay Area and Teutonic scenes, Australian thrash metal has had a fairly substantial following in overseas markets, while local audiences have always been difficult to gather. Probably the most well-known Australian thrash bands from the 1980s would be Mortal Sin and Hobbs' Angel of Death.

== History ==
=== 1980s ===
It is uncertain where or when the thrash metal scene in Australia began, but one of the earliest records of a band playing the style of music would be the Melbourne group Heresy in 1982, who would later change their name to Nothing Sacred. While the members of Nothing Sacred did not consider themselves a thrash metal group, the influences from the style were apparent, also blending influences from NWOBHM and, on their full-length album Let Us Prey hardcore punk, with a cover of an SOD song. Peter Hobbs, front-man from the Melbourne band Tyrus, would later collaborate with the members of Nothing Sacred to record the early demos of what would later become Hobbs' Angel of Death.

1985 through to 1992 was the "peak" period of the Australian thrash metal scene, as local audiences with interest in the genre began to increase, and more bands would begin playing the style of music. Sydney's Mortal Sin were founded in 1985 by vocalist Mat Maurer and drummer Wayne Campbell, from the remnants of a traditional metal band called Wizzard. In 1986 the band recorded the demo Mayhemic Destruction. So impressed were the band with the recording's turnout, Mortal Sin decided to release Mayhemic Destruction as an album the following year to praising reviews, and helped them establish a healthy fanbase locally and overseas, eventuating in a national tour with Metallica in 1989 and an overseas tour with Testament and Faith No More in 1990. Sydney band Slaughter Lord were also impressing fans across the seas, but after only a release of one demo tape (titled Taste of Blood), the band disintegrated in 1987 after only one year of activity. Swedish band At the Gates would record a Slaughter Lord cover song (Legion) on their 1995 Slaughter of the Soul album. Another band, Addictive were also well known in the Sydney scene, releasing two albums and headlining a metal festival with Motörhead before ending in 1996.

Melbourne's thrash scene was also on the rise in the 1980s, with bands like Renegade and Rampage recording albums. Hobbs' Angel of Death released their self-titled album in 1988 through German label Steamhammer/SPV Records. Possibly one of the heaviest Australian recordings of its time, Hobbs' Angel of Death showcased a very distinct, heavily Satanic, Slayer-influenced sound. While initially intended as a studio project, Hobbs' Angel of Death would play a few shows before ending at the turn of the decade, but would reform several times over the next few years.

In other cities, interest in thrash metal was also on the rise, with Canberra band Armoured Angel and Alchemist's early demos showcasing distinct thrash metal sounds. Both bands would later evolve in their sounds later in their respective careers, with Armoured Angel transforming into a death metal group and Alchemist incorporating more psychedelic and progressive influences in their sound. Black Widow from Brisbane, who played an Alice Cooper and Motörhead influenced style of what they dubbed to be "black metal", would later change their line-up and reform under the name Iron Lightning, which showcased a melodic thrash sound similar to Megadeth.

=== 1990s ===
After the rise of grunge music and more groove metal styled bands like Machine Head and Pantera entering the fore, the Australian thrash metal scene soon imploded with most of the bands either breaking up, or re-inventing their musical style. Newer bands like Allegiance, Segression and Cryogenic would begin to gain notice in the mid-1990s incorporating these thrash-influenced groove metal sounds.

However, more extreme acts incorporating elements of thrash metal mixed with elements of death metal and black metal were also on the rise during the late 1980s and early 1990s, the earliest of which being Sydney's Sadistik Exekution from Melbourne. Sadistik Exekution gained notoriety throughout the 1990s for their chaotic death metal style and nihilistic on-stage behaviour. Corpse Molestation would later transform into the black metal band Bestial Warlust. After Bestial Warlust came to an end, the former members would embark on their own projects – Abominator, Gospel of the Horns, and Deströyer 666. Deströyer 666 and Gospel of the Horns would become the leading purveyors of the Australian blackened thrash movement. Australia's underground metal scene is probably best known for this movement today, with all of the bands finding healthy audiences overseas and locally in the heavy metal underground and some of the bands making frequent visits overseas, with Deströyer 666 eventually moving to Europe in 2001.

=== 2000s onward ===
Australian thrash metal, while still a very underground scene, still receives a fairly substantial following in local and overseas markets. In the 2000s, newer thrash metal bands have made their mark while older acts have reformed. Hobbs' Angel of Death and Mortal Sin made their comebacks in 2004 and 2003 respectively, with Hobbs' re-releasing their demos on a compilation album and performing at the Wacken Open Air Festival. Mortal Sin would release a new album in 2007, An Absence of Faith, before embarking on two more overseas tours.

In recent years, thrash metal has had a steady rise in interest throughout most of Australia, with bands such as 4ARM taking the lead for most of the early 2000s, and as of the 2010s there have been multiple bands forming and playing their own style of thrash metal. On August 27, 2016, an annual inside festival called 'ShredFest' featured Kaustic Attack, Deraign and Asylum.

== Characteristics ==
Early Australian thrash metal bands in the 1980s incorporated significant American and Teutonic thrash influences in their sounds. Mortal Sin's Mayhemic Destruction album had very distinct influences from Metallica and Exodus, while Hobbs' Angel of Death showcased a heavier sound influenced by the likes of Venom and Slayer.

== Australian thrash metal bands ==
- Addictive
- Allegiance
- Armoured Angel
- Deströyer 666
- Gospel of the Horns
- Grave Forsaken
- Hobbs' Angel of Death
- Mortal Sin
- Mortification
- Nothing Sacred
- Sadistik Exekution

== See also ==
- Music of Australia
- Australian heavy metal
- Thrash metal
