= Metal Down Under =

- Film poster
- Directed by: Nick Calpakdjian
- Produced by: Nick Calpakdjian
- Distributed by: MGM (Australia), Plastic Head (UK)
- Release date: 22 August 2014
- Running time: 165 minutes
- Country: Australia
- Language: English

Metal Down Under is a 2014 documentary directed by Nick Calpakdjian. The film uses interviews, archival footage and animation to trace the history of heavy metal music in Australia. Calpakdjian partly funded the film through crowd-funding website Pozible. It was released in Australia on 22 August 2014 with distribution by MGM. On 1 September 2014 it debuted on the ARIA Top 40 Music DVDs chart at #4.

== Content ==
Metal Down Under traces the history of heavy metal music in Australia from the early influences of bands such as Buffalo, AC/DC, The Angels and Rose Tattoo to present day acts including Ne Obliviscaris, King Parrot, Karnivool and Psycroptic. The film is divided into three 55-minute episodes featuring interviews, archival footage and animation sequences with the first episode discussing the early development of metal from hard rock influences to the thrash scenes of late 1980s Melbourne and Sydney, in particular Hobbs' Angel of Death and Mortal Sin. There is also some examination of the niche record stores Metal For Melbourne and Utopia, Hot Metal magazine and the influence of public radio on the spread of the genre. Part two looks at the influence of Perth band Allegiance in the development of a national touring circuit, as well as the Metal for the Brain festival and the extreme metal bands Blood Duster, Alchemist and Sadistik Exekution. The third part looks primarily at several of the more prominent currently active bands with some discussion of the metalcore scene and the shape of the scene at the present time.

== Distribution ==
Metal Down Under was released on DVD in Australia through MGM Distribution. It was released in the UK and Europe through Plastichead Distribution on 10 November 2014. Its official release date on iTunes is 18 November 2014 worldwide (ex USA).

== Reviews ==
"Nick Calpakdjian has made a funny and engrossing film that finally sheds a light on a part of Australia's popular culture that has been left in the dark for its entire existence, a vital and important document that even people who couldn't care less about heavy metal should see. After spending two years of his life on this, he deserves nothing but respect." Reviewed by Brian Giffin.

"One might even go so far as to say that Metal Down Under is an important piece for the Metal community, as it may well be, itself, a stepping stone to another such feature in the future; and that will hold promise for another time. " Reviewed by Tristan Peterson, Metal Obsession.

== Interviews ==
Artist	Band
Steve Hughes	Mortal Sin, Slaughterlord
Dave Harrison	Allegiance
Tony Campo	Allegiance
Peter Hobbs	Hobbs' Angel of Death
Dave Slave	Sadistik Exekution
Adam Agius	Alchemist, The Levitation Hex
Rodney Holder	Alchemist
Steve Rowe	Mortification
Matt Skitz	Damaged, King Parrot
Jason Fuller	Blood Duster
Dave Haley	Psycroptic, Blood Duster
Shane Southby	Taramis
Phil Gresik	Hobbs' Angel of Death, Deströyer 666, Bestial Warlust
Sham Littleman	Nothing Sacred, Hobbs' Angel of Death
Karl Lean	Nothing Sacred, Hobbs' Angel of Death
Chris Rand	Segression
Glen Dyson	Claim the Throne
Lord Tim	Lord, Dungeon
Jason North	Truth Corroded
Greg Shaw	Truth Corroded
Mark Palfreyman	Alarum, The Levitation Hex
Steve Watts	Manticore, Heaven the Axe
Tim Aldridge	Abramelin
Matt Young	King Parrot
Andrew Goddard	Karnivool
Mark Hosking	Karnivool
Matthew Chalk	Psycroptic, Mephistopheles
Mat Maurer	Mortal Sin
Johnny Stoj	Pegazus
John Gibson	Renegade
Aaron Butler	Frankenbok
Dan McDougall	Frankenbok
Greg Trull	Dreadnaught
Richie Poate	Dreadnaught
Joe Kapiteyn	iNFeCTeD, The Devil Rides Out
Tim Charles	Ne Obliviscaris
Daniel Estrin	Voyager
Simone Dow	Voyager
Mark De Vattimo	Psychonaut

=== Non-musicians ===
- Andrew Haug, broadcaster
- Lochlan Watt, broadcaster, writer
- Brad Wesson, co-owner, Soundworks Touring
- Robyn Doreian, journalist, editor Hot Metal magazine
- Greta Tate, record store manager
- Simon Lukic, broadcaster
- Chris Maric, publicist
- Leigh Wilson, collector who has filmed Australian metal shows since 1981
- Brian Giffin, writer, broadcaster
