= Black Jack (Australian band) =

Black Jack was an Australian heavy metal/classical band that was active in the 1980/90s.

== History ==
Blackjack formed in Melbourne, Australia in 1979, releasing a demo that same year and another in 1983. An EP on the Metal for Melbourne label in 1985, Five Pieces o' Eight, was recorded at 'Saturn studio' with George Simak (Taramis). A much anticipated first and second album was recorded, but never released, due to workloads and the death of two of their members. Their musical style included elements of NWOBHM, classical, power metal and doom metal. They were fronted by the brothers Rick and Jonny Giles, direct descendants of Thomas Giles (who was hanged for piracy), and are still currently active, re-recording at 'Guruland Studios' and 'Voodoo Lounge' with engineer and owner Kevin Welgus. There is a serious chance of a live re-appearance as rehearsals between the members are currently underway. At the moment, they play more conventional rock under the guise of 'Rick Giles' Crackerjack' and a black metal project 'Poison Blood' featuring guest stalwart Peter Hobbs from Hobbs' Angel of Death in Victoria. They were among the first to fuse pirate themes into metal.

== Last Known Line Up ==
- Rick Giles: Vocals/perc.and prod.
- 'H.R.H' Greta Tate: management (Metal for Melbourne)
- Mick Burns: Drums/perc. *'Blackbeard' Ian, stage production and drum tech
- Daryl Williams: Bass/ prod. *'Admiral' Brian, publicity and touring management
- Jonny Giles: guitars/violin/piano

== Former members ==
- Paul Gleason aka 'Jackie': bass (1979) *'Squire' pyro-psycho Gary Doyle
- John Van Tongaren aka 'Thunderfoot': drums (1981–1985)
- Bruce the 'Bruce-stir': (Thunderfoot's drum tech)

These members played on bass and drums, respectively, and were replaced by Daryl Williams aka. 'Buzzard' on bass and Mick Burns on drums prior to BLACKJACK's only release, the Five Pieces O' Eight EP.

== Discography ==
- Five Pieces o' Eight (1985)

== Track Listing for Five Pieces O' Eight EP (Vinyl Version) ==
- 1. "Introduction"
- 2. "Highwayman's Inn"
- 3. "Hot Rocket"
- 4. "Prelude No.3"
- 5. "Man at Arms"
- 6. "The Wizard"

== Track Listing for Demo ==
- 1. "Crusader's Revenge"
- 2. "The Last Warrior"
- 3. "Death of an Animal" (live)
- 4. "Spanish Lover" (live)
- 5. "Back to the Mountain"
- A studio 'demo tape', was released locally in 1979, with "Spanish Lover", "Black Russian", "Pyramid Hill" and "Fish Creek boogie". "Prelude no.1 and 2", were recorded also, but were scrapped in production. "Prelude no.3", was re-written and re-recorded for the EP.
