= Dave Tinelt =

Australian musician

Dave Tinelt is a heavy metal music vocalist with Mortal Sin and Nekrofeist.

Tinelt was born in Port Kembla, New South Wales (born 1974) and grew up in the Wollongong suburb of Bellambi. Tinelt knew he wanted to be in a metal band when he was 12–13 years old. He joined his first metal band Stentorian as the drummer.

In March 2012, Tinelt was announced as the new lead singer of Mortal Sin. and fronted the band for a number of gigs before it broke up.
