= Metal for the Brain =

Australian heavy metal music festival

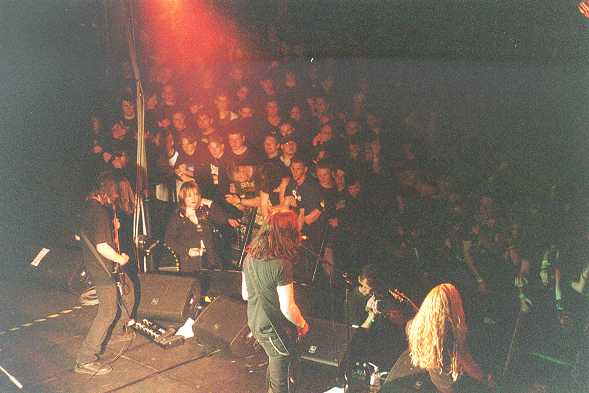
- Psi.Kore at Metal for the Brain 2001
- Genre: Heavy metal, death metal, black metal, thrash metal, grindcore
- Dates: October - December
- Locations: Australia: Canberra (1991 - 2006); Perth (2005); Brisbane (2005)
- Years active: 1991 - 2006

Metal for the Brain was Australia's largest heavy metal music festival. The event was held in Canberra annually, usually towards the end of the year, and featured Australian bands almost exclusively. The festival was established in November 1991 as a charity event for the National Brain Injury Foundation and continued as such until the final event in November 2006.

== History ==
In 1990, Canberra teenager Alec Hurley suffered severe and permanent brain damage and was rendered a quadriplegic after he attempted to stop a fight outside a night club. Hurley was left permanently disabled and, with little government assistance, his friend, Joel Green, of local death metal band Armoured Angel organised the first Metal for the Brain concert for 16 November 1991, to raise money for Hurley's benefit and the National Brain Injury Foundation. The first event featured six acts; in the following year it was expanded to ten artists and included two punk bands, The Hammonds and The Hard Ons. Green and Armoured Angel organised the festival each year until 1996, when the band split up. After this, the event was put together by another Canberra band, Alchemist, the only act to have appeared at every Metal for the Brain. From 1990 to 1996, the festival was held at the ANU Bar. It moved to Canberra University in 2000, where it was held from that time forward. The final Metal for the Brain festival was held on 4 November 2006.

== The Festival ==
Even in a country where heavy metal bands are neglected or reviled even by the alternative music press and industry, Metal for the Brain grew consistently since its inception. By 2000, the show had grown so big that it necessitated a move to a new venue from its long-time home at the ANU. From a bill of only six bands in 1991, by 2006 Metal for the Brain featured more than 30 and extended for more than 14 hours across three stages. In 2000, an international act was added to the show for the first time when Canadian metal pioneers Voivod headlined the event. German thrash band Destruction and Japanese thrash band Sun's Owl were booked to play MFTB in 2002. However, due to insurance problems the show was cancelled for the first time ever. Over the years, the musical focus of the event moved from exclusively death, thrash and black metal bands to a variety of styles and in later years nu metal, industrial, hard rock, progressive rock and hardcore bands took to the various stages. This caused some discontent among some sections of the heavy metal fan base, but MFTB remained the single largest event on the calendar for Australian metal fans.

Overseas touring commitments for Alchemist meant the festival was not held in 2004, but returned in February 2005. That year, smaller versions of the festival were held in Brisbane and Perth. Alchemist also played at these shows.

On 25 July 2006, an announcement was made on the heavy metal radio show Full Metal Racket on Triple J that the festival that year would be the last. US death metal band Skinless headlined the show. In 2014 a documentary film, Metal Down Under, included a section on Metal for the Brain.

== Line-ups ==
- 16 November 1991 - Armoured Angel, Exceed, Adrenalin, Alchemist, Precursor, Nemesis
- 14 November 1992 - Hard Ons, The Hammonds, Bladder Spasms, Adrenalin, Armoured Angel, Alchemist, Percursor, Grungeon, Cyborium, Manticore
- 13 November 1993 - Christbait, Misery, Acheron, Cruciform, Armoured Angel, Alchemist, Manticore, Persecution, Catharsis, Psychrist, Public Hanging
- November 1994 - Cruciform (cancelled), Alchemist, Armoured Angel, Manticore, Psychrist, Epitaph, Cod Peace, Black Earth, Dement Ensemble
- 2 December 1995 - Damaged, Alchemist, Bestial Warlust, Armoured Angel, Manticore, Psychrist, Superheist, Fracture, Dement Ensemble, Blathudah
- 14 December 1996 - Alchemist, Blood Duster, Discordia, Abramelin, Superheist, Manticore, In:Extremis, Psychrist, Cod Peace, Pod People
- 20 December 1997 - Alchemist, Damaged, Blood Duster, Segression, Manticore, Abramelin, Mortal Sin, Armoured Angel, Superheist (cancelled - replaced by Dreadnaught), Psychrist, Crypt, Cryptal Darkness
- 28 November 1998 - Segression, Alchemist, Damaged, Blood Duster, Deströyer 666, Beanflipper (cancelled - replaced by Dreadnaught), Misery, Armoured Angel, Cryogenic, Manticore (cancelled - replaced by Linedriver), Pod People, Deviant Plan, Lord Kaos, Sakkuth, Engraved, Soulcrusher, Volatile
- 27 November 1999 - Cryogenic, Alchemist, Blood Duster, Superheist, Nazxul, Deströyer 666, Armoured Angel, Dreadnaught, Pod People, Sakkuth, Psi.Kore, Order of Chaos, Lord Kaos, Earth, Psychrist, Crypt, Dungeon, Kompost
- 28 October 2000 - Voivod, Alchemist, Blood Duster, Sadistik Exekution (cancelled - replaced by Alarum), Henry's Anger, Cryogenic, Dreadnaught, Abramelin, Pod People, Deströyer 666, Misery, Psi.Kore, Psychrist, Frankenbok, Lord Kaos, Sakkuth, Toe Cutter, Screwface:13, Earth, Dungeon, Deadspawn, The Wolves (cancelled - replaced by Volatile), Chalice, Post Life Disorder, Astriaal, Encabulos, Atomizer, Dezakrate, Third Symptom
- 20 October 2001 - Dungeon, Gospel of the Horns, Atomizer, Alchemist, Blood Duster, Psi.Kore, Sakkuth, Pod People, Dreadnaught, Earth, Frankenbok, Alarum, Chalice, Hypercenter, Psycroptic, Within Blood, Post Life Disorder, Screamage, Resistica, Clone B, Dark Order, Lycanthia, Hellspawn, Maladiction, Psychrist, Volatile, Deadspawn, Jerk, Hollow, Devolved, Elysium, Tribal Clown, Myrddraal, Truth Corroded, Redsands, Enter VI, Contrive
- 20 December 2003 - Damaged, Alchemist, Hobbs' Angel of Death, Blood Duster, Devolved, Virgin Black, Deströyer 666, Cog, Vanishing Point, Dungeon, Psychrist (cancelled - replaced by Kill For Satan), Jerk, Atomizer, Earth, Frankenbok, Pod People, Astriaal, Forte, Fuck... I'm Dead, Psycroptic, Dark Order, Contrive, Sakkuth, Daysend, Mindsnare, Infernal Method, Embodiment, Gospel of the Horns, Tourettes, The Stockholm Syndrome, Flesh Mechanic, Captain Cleanoff, D:Nine, Shatterwrath, LOG
- 5 February 2005 (Canberra event only) - Blood Duster, Alchemist, Dungeon, Astriaal, Fuck... I'm Dead, Frankenbok, Psycroptic, Daysend, Alarum, Sakkuth, Vanishing Point, Walk the Earth, Parkway Drive, Gospel of the Horns, The Day Everything Became Nothing, Plague, Tailbone, Japunga, Pod People, Minus Life, K.I.N., Contrive, Earth, Brace, The Stockholm Syndrome, Mindsnare, The Deadly, Skintilla, 4 Dead, Repture, Fort, Sebasrockets
- 4 November 2006 - I Killed the Prom Queen, Skinless, Alchemist, Frankenbok, Alarum, The Furor, Fuck... I'm Dead, Vanishing Point, Dreadnaught, Infernal Method, Pod People, The Day Everything Became Nothing, Shifosi, Anarazel, Minus Life, Truth Corroded, Ebolie, Clagg, Contrive, Switchblade, Inane Eminence, Shigella, Lord, Darkest Dawn, LOG, Whitehorse, Kill for Satan, Mytile Vey Lorth, Blood Duster, Captain Cleanoff, Gospel of the Horns, M.S.I., Earth, Ne Oblivscaris, Antonamasia, Ruins, 4 Dead, Samsara, Choke, Ghastly
