= Bengal Tigers (band) =

Australian heavy metal band

- Origin: Melbourne, Victoria, Australia
- Genres: Heavy metal
- Years active: 1979–1984; 1989-1999; 2014–present
- Labels: SM, Mushroom

Bengal Tigers are an Australian heavy metal band, which were formed in 1979 by long-term members Gordon Heald on lead vocals and Barney Fakhouri on guitars. The band were active throughout the early 1980s, with reformations in the 1990s and 2010s. Bengal Tigers have released two studio albums, In the Blood (1997) and Cry Havoc (2025).

== Early history (1979–1984) ==
Bengal Tigers were formed in Melbourne in 1979 by Mick Egan on drums, Gordon Heald on lead vocals, Barney Faroukhi on guitars and Steve Tyler on bass guitar. According to Australian musicologist Ian McFarlane they "took their inspiration from European heavy metal bands", which was typified by Judas Priest, Accept and the Scorpions. Bengal Tigers, as exponents of Australian heavy metal, were "working the [local] scene of the early to mid-1980s."

Bengal Tigers were known for their energetic stage performances. After providing several shows around Melbourne, including the inaugural Metal for Melbourne festival in 1981, the band released their debut four-track extended play, Metal Fetish, in 1983 via their independent label, SM Records. The EP was re-released by Mushroom Records in the following year, with a re-recording of the track, "Break and Bend", which had been released as a single in October 1983. According to AllMusic, "they purveyed clichéd heavy metal that lacked both identity and energy." In November 1983 they appeared on ABC-TV's Rock Arena.

Bengal Tigers promoted the EP's release with a series of interstate shows, a TV appearance on variety show Hey Hey it's Saturday, and a new single, "Cheat On" (September 1984). Also in 1984, the group began working on a debut album, but with little promotion from Mushroom Records, their singles failed to chart. Bengal Tigers disbanded later that year and the proposed album was never completed.

== Reformation (1989–1999) ==
After a five-year absence, the Bengal Tigers reformed in 1989, but with guitarist Yuri Yinzew (ex-Axatak) replacing Faroukhi. The band released a cassette-only EP shortly after with Faroukhi rejoining the band in 1992. Throughout the 1990s, Bengal Tigers played live sporadically and independently released another tape single, "Do It!" in 1992.

By 1995, Egan and Tyler had departed the band, with James R. Power replacing Tyler and second guitarist Keith Peter-Budge joining. Session musician Noel Tenney played drums for their following two EPs, six-track Painclinic (July 1995) and three-track In One Ear (November 1997). By September 1997, the band had recorded their debut studio album, In the Blood (1998), via SM Records. It provided a cover version of Beastie Boys' 1986 song, "Fight for Your Right", which was issued as a single in May 1998. Shortly after this release, Peter-Budge departed. In the Blood was delayed until December 1998 due to problems with its artwork. They disbanded once more by the end of 1999.

== Current era (2010-present) ==
Bengal Tigers played a one-off performance at a Metal for Melbourne reunion show in 2010 alongside 1980s Melbourne metal pioneers Nothing Sacred, S.A.S., and Blackjack. The band officially reformed in 2014, performing at Sydney's Steel Assassins Festival. Bengal Tigers continued to play sporadically throughout the remaining 2010s and into 2020s, performing occasional shows in Sydney and Melbourne.

In 2024, Bengal Tigers embarked on a European tour with an appearance at Germany's Keep It True festival. The band supported the Rods, Raven and Ross the Boss on their Australian tours in the following year. Original bass guitarist Steve Tyler died in February 2025. In August 2025, Bengal Tigers released their first album in over 25 years, Cry Havoc, which was followed by a national Australian tour.

== Band members ==
=== Current members ===
- Barney Fakhouri – guitars (1979–1984, 1992–1999, 2014–present)
- Gordon Heald – lead vocals (1979–1984, 1989–1999, 2014–present)
- James R. Power - bass guitar (1995-1999, 2014-present)
- Mick Egan - Drums (1979-1984, 1989–1995, 2014-present)

=== Former members ===
- Steve Tyler – bass guitar (1979–1984, 1989–1995, died 2025)
- Keith Peter-Budge – guitars (1995–1999)
- Neil Tenney - drums (1995, 1997)

== Discography ==
=== Studio albums ===
- In the Blood (20 December 1998) – SM Records, Laneway Music
- Cry Havoc (1 August 2025) – Iron Shield Records

=== Extended plays ===
- Metal Fetish (1983)
- Painclinic (7 January 1995) – Laneway Music
- In One Ear (1997)

=== Singles ===
- "Break and Bend'" (1983)
- "Cheat On" (1984)
- '"Fight for Your Right" (1998)
