= Gospel of the Horns =

Australian black metal band

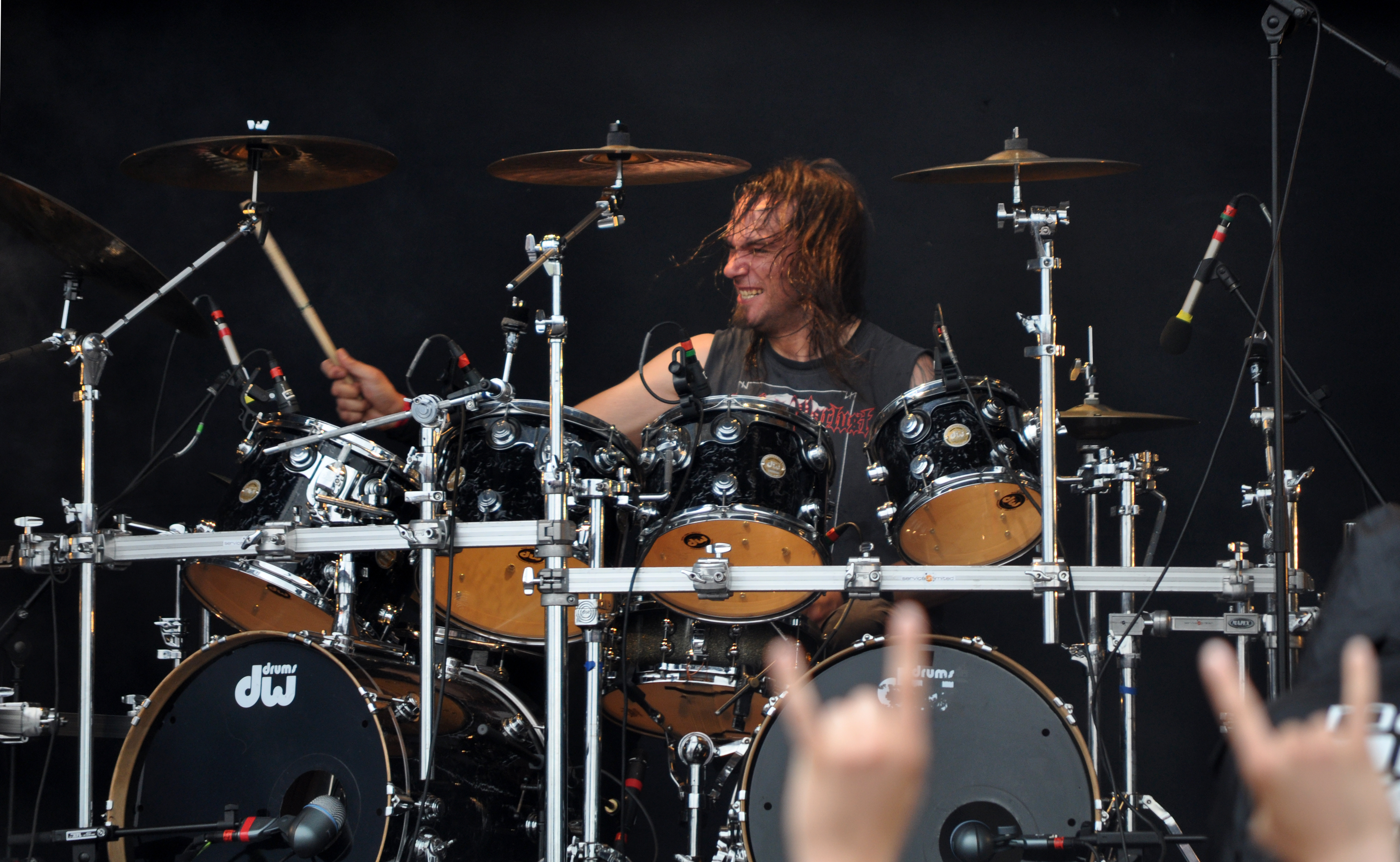
- Gospel of the Horns at Party.San Open Air 2012

Background information
- Origin: Brisbane, Australia
- Genres: Black metal, thrash metal
- Years active: 1993–2018
- Labels: Invictus Productions; Morbid Productions; Damnation Records; Einstand Records
- Members: Mark Howitzer; Markus Hellcunt; Masochist

Gospel of the Horns was an Australian black metal band formed in 1993 by vocalist Shane Transvaal D (of Deinonychus) and Mark Howitzer. Originating from Brisbane, the band released two EPs and two albums.

== History ==
Gospel of the Horns formed in 1993, consisting of Mark Howitzer (drums), Shane Davidson (vocals) (who died in 2011) and bassist Anton, who never recorded with the band. Later, Hellbutcher joined on guitars and bass. In late 1994, the band released their first demo, The Satanist's Dream, and signed with Einstand Records. The label intended to press the demo to CD, but the final product contained mistakes such as incorrect layouts and a photo of another band in the booklet. To this day, the band refuses to include the CD version of the demo in their discography.

In 1995, the band played their only show with the original line up, including Vulture on drums, opening for Misery at the Roxy Club. Vulture later appeared uncredited on their two-track demo. In 1996, Davidson was fired due to issues within the group. Founding member Howitzer relocated to Melbourne. For a time, he played drums for Deströyer 666, featuring on their 1997 album Unchain the Wolves.

Howitzer reformed Gospel of the Horns in 1997. The line-up consisted of lyricist Howitzer on vocals, Ryan Marauder on guitar, and drummer Warhammer. In May 1998, the band's second demo, Sinners, was recorded and released independently. At this stage, the band signed with Dutch label Damnation Records for a mini-LP and a full-length release.

Shortly after Sinners, Warhammer was replaced with Obliterator. A deal with Morbid Productions resulted in the release of the 7-inch EP Monuments of Impurity. The EP contains three tracks, of which one is a cover of the Mortal Sin song "Blood, Death, Hatred".

Following their first EP, in 1999, Obliterator was replaced with ex-Bestial Warlust drummer Hellcunt. A year later, Gospel of the Horns released mini-LP Eve of the Conqueror through Damnation Records. In July to August 2000, the band embarked on their first tour of Europe, playing alongside Pentacle, Enthroned, Primordial, and Thus Defiled. Countries included in the tour were the Netherlands, France, Belgium, England, and Ireland. The band participated in the Stonehenge Festival in the Netherlands.

Returning from the European tour, the band recruited second guitarist Chris Masochist. In September 2001, the band recorded A Call to Arms at St. Andrews Studio. Due to financial problems, the band could not fulfill their deal with Damnation Records, and so the album was released through Invictus Productions.

In June 2005, Marauder left to start his own band, Funerary Pit. An Australian tour for Gospel of the Horns with Swedish band Dismember followed. In 2006, Trench Hell guitarist, Hexx, joined the band. In 2007 the next full-length album Realm of the Damned was released.

In January 2007 the band split up, but reformed two weeks later. The new line-up was essentially the same except for Marauder's rejoining and Hexx's departure. In June 2008 the band performed in Seattle. In September 2009 Gospel of the Horns played their "last ever shows in Europe" in the Netherlands, Germany and Ireland (Dublin).

Though the band had announced that they will play their last show on 7 December 2008, supporting Swedish death metal band Grave, at Melbourne's Corner Hotel, they performed alongside Japan's Coffins in September 2010 in their Melbourne live show.

== Reception ==
Elementalist described Gospel of the Horns' lyrical ideology as "confronting our most despised and traditional enemy and its conformist religion".

Archaic Magazine reviewer, Julian Klassen wrote, "Gospel of the Horns is another band that plays that typical Australian metal, and is definitively one of the best in its genre".

== Members ==
=== Final Members ===
- Mark Howitzer – Bass, Vocals (1997–2007, 2007–2018), Drums (1993–1996)
- Chris Masochist – Guitar (2000–2007, 2007–2018)
- Chris Menning – Drums (2012–2018)

=== Former Members ===
- Rob "Death Dealer" Curry – Guitars, Bass (1993–1996)
- Shane "Transvaal D." Davidson – Vocals (1993–1996)
- "Vulture" - Drums (1994 -1996)
- Peter "Warhammer" Martin – Drums (1997–1998)
- Ryan Marauder – Guitar (1997–2005, 2007–2011)
- Shannon "Hexx" Hush – Guitar (2006–2007)
- Brett Murray – Drums (1998–1999)
- Marcus Hellcunt – Drums (1999–2007, 2007–2012)

Timeline

== Discography ==
=== Studio albums ===
Year of release	Title	Label
1994	The Satanist's Dream (Demo)	Einstand Records
1998	Sinners (Demo)	Independent
1998	Monuments of Impurity (EP)	Morbid Productions
2000	Eve of the Conqueror (mini-LP)	Damnation Records
2002	A Call to Arms	Invictus Productions
2007	Realm of the Damned	Invictus Productions
2007	Sinners/Monuments of Impurity (Compilation)	Kneel Before The Master's Throne Records
