= Chalice (band) =

Australian gothic-doom metal band

- Origin: Adelaide, Australia
- Genres: Gothic-doom metal
- Years active: 1997–2007
- Label: Modern Invasion
- Past members: Shiralee Morgan; Adrian Bickle; Matt Enright; Sean Graetz; Justin Hartwig; Simon Henderson; Mark Bodossian; Alana Probert; Darren McLennan
- Website: chalice.mu

Chalice was an Australian Gothic-doom metal band from Adelaide, South Australia. The group released three albums and was perhaps Australia's most notable Gothic metal band for a number of years before splitting up in 2007.

The band was formed by singer/keyboards player Shiralee Morgan and drummer Adrian Bickle in late 1996. The pair was at the time in a band called Jeneaha that released a demo before breaking up. Morgan and Bickle continued the project under the new name of Chalice. With guitarists Sean Graetz and Darren McLennan (from fellow Adelaide band Fury), bass player Mark Bodossian and Russell providing violin, the band recorded Chronicles of Dysphoria which won them the attention of Melbourne label Modern Invasion. In the meantime Justin Hartwig had replaced McLennan, who departed to continue with Fury and Alannah Probert also joined the band playing flute in place of the violinist. Chronicles of Dysphoria was then re-recorded with updated arrangements and released through Modern Invasion in 2000. In October they then featured at the Metal for the Brain festival in Canberra.

Chalice recorded their second album during 2001 and it was released in October to coincide with another appearance at Metal for the Brain, this time on the main stage. Bodossian left the group after this and was replaced by Simon Henderson in time for a tour of the east coast in early 2002. Bodossian later joined the British doom band Esoteric.

During 2003 Chalice completed their third album, Augmented, featuring some cello parts from Joel Baligod and Infernal Method member Joss Separovic contributing Spanish guitar in the track "Child of the Matador". The band also supported Opeth and Mayhem during their Australian tours that year.

Adrian Bickle departed Chalice in 2005 and was replaced by Matt Enright. The group then did a tour of New Zealand during the year. A new EP was completed by mid-2006. Featuring strings provided by the Zephyr Quartet, "The Calm That Was the Storm" was Probert's last release with the band as she left prior to its release. A video was made of the title track and was included on the resultant CD. After this, the band's activities seemed to freeze for almost a year. On 5 May 2007, Justin Hartwig posted to the group's internet forum that he and the rest of Chalice had split from Morgan, bringing the group to an end and announcing a forthcoming new band called Black Orchid. Morgan has since contended that she too will continue a separate musical avenue.

== Discography ==
Chalice (demo)

- Released: 1997
- Format: CD
- Tracks: 1. Beauty Unadorned 2. Dawn 3. Holy Water

Chronicles of Dysphoria

- Released: 1998
- Format: CD
- Tracks: 1. Solitary Waves (6:14) 2. Requiescat (5:09) 3. The Amber Twilight (9:05) 4. As Powder Turns To Dust (8:02) 5. Solveig's Song (2:51) 6. Interlunar Dreams (6:17) 7. Memorial Embers (9:09)

Chronicles of Dysphoria

- Released: 2000
- Format: CD
- Label: Modern Invasion Music (Australia)

An Illusion to the Temporary Real

- Released: 2001
- Format: CD
- Label: Modern Invasion Music (Australia)

Augmented

- Released: 2003
- Format: CD
- Label: Modern Invasion Music (Australia)
- Tracks: 1. Liaising Pandora (6:01) 2. Neuron (4:23) 3. A Winter In The Desert Sky (10:54) 4. Portrait (8:11) 5. Child Of The Matador (7:09) 6. Static (4:32) 7. A Semblance Of Sanity (15:03)

The Calm That Was the Storm

- Released: 2006
- Format: CD
- Label: Modern Invasion Music (Australia)
- Tracks: 1. The Calm That Was the Storm 2. The Stigma of an Age (Revisited) 3. Static (Electric) 4. Solitary Waves (Revisited) 4. The Calm That Was the Storm (remix) 5. The Calm That Was the Storm (video)
