= Nothing Sacred (band) =

Australian speed metal band

- Origin: Victoria, Australia
- Genres: Thrash metal, speed metal
- Years active: 1983–1991, 2015–present
- Members: Karl Lean; Sham; Darren Cherry; George Larin; Joel Henderson
- Website: Official Website

Nothing Sacred are an Australian speed metal band from Melbourne, Victoria. The band formed in 1983 and were early pioneers of the Australian heavy metal scene, and one of the first Australian bands to play speed metal. The band split in 1989 and reformed in the 2010s.

== History ==
=== Early history (1980–1989) ===
The origins of Nothing Sacred date back to 1980 with drummer Sham and guitarists Craig "Corpse" Chenko and Kevin "Chunder" Christopher in the band Satans Child. This pre-Nothing Sacred band recorded several demos before splitting in 1982. Bassist Karl Lean and Sham then formed the band Vengeance with vocalist Mick Burnham and guitarists Corpse and Alan Raskas, before quickly changing the name to Heresy. This lineup performed several shows around Melbourne including the 1983 Metal for Melbourne festival before both guitarists left the band. With a desire for a faster, heavier sound, Lean, Sham, and Burnham renamed the band to "Nothing Sacred" in 1983, and guitarists Mark Woolley and Richard "Buddy" Snape completed the lineup.

The band's music was heavily inspired by Motörhead, Judas Priest and Thin Lizzy, and were one of the first bands in Australia to play speed metal. Nothing Sacred performed regularly throughout Melbourne and were part of the city's emerging heavy metal scene of the 1980s. Encouraged by the enthusiastic response to their live shows, Nothing Sacred recorded their debut EP Deathwish in late 1984 which was released independently the following year. The group followed up the release with a series of shows in Melbourne, Adelaide and Sydney, headlining 1986's Metal For Melbourne festival.

In 1986, Buddy departed Nothing Sacred, and the group continued as a four-piece for some time before temporarily recruiting George Larin (Taramis). From 1985 to 1988, members of Nothing Sacred embarked on several side projects. Lean and Sham formed a punk side project called Non Compos Mentis, while Sham also had a short stint in Melbourne punk group Depression in 1985. Woolley contributed guitars to the first Hobbs' Angel of Death demo in 1987. Lean and Sham would also contribute to Hobbs' second demo the following year. Woolley would eventually join Hobbs' Angel of Death as a full-time member and perform guitar on the debut album.

Following the departure of Woolley, guitarists Terry Campbell and Richard Bubica joined Nothing Sacred in 1987. The band had already tracked an album with Woolley titled Let Us Prey which was released via Cleopatra Records in 1988. The album was recorded and mixed on a lean budget in only five days, and as a result suffered from poor production. In 1988, Nothing Sacred were selected to support Megadeth on their debut Australian tour, however the tour was cancelled at the last minute.

The new lineup began recording for their second album in 1989; however tensions within the band led to the recording being abandoned and the band "unofficially" breaking up that year. Nothing Sacred reunited for a 10th Anniversary show in 1993, before going dormant once again. Following the breakup, vocalist Mick Burnham later joined short-lived Melbourne band Seizure. Woolley left Hobbs' Angel of Death in 1990 and formed his own project Toecutter the following year. Sham would perform session drums for Long Voyage Back's second album, while Lean formed the symphonic metal project Temujin in the mid-2000s.

=== Re-formation (2010–present) ===
Lean, Sham and Burnham reunited Nothing Sacred for a brief performance at a Metal for Melbourne reunion show in 2010 alongside Bengal Tigers, S.A.S and Blackjack. Ross Percy of Ion Drive joined the band on guitars. In 2012, the group reunited again with Percy on guitars joined by a returning George Larin and performed shows with a re-formed Hobbs' Angel of Death and a support slot with Paul Di'Anno. Members of Nothing Sacred participated in the Australian metal documentaries Metal Down Under in 2014 and Thrash or F*** Off in 2019. In 2015, Burnham would depart Nothing Sacred and was later replaced by vocalist Chris Stark. Nothing Sacred performed more shows in 2015 including Sydney's Steel Assassins festival, followed by a short tour of Japan.

In 2020, Ross Percy was replaced by guitarist Stu Bedford, and Chris Stark was replaced by vocalist James Davies. Nothing Sacred's first recording in 32 years, a 7" single titled First World Problems was released later that year and was followed by the album No Gods in 2021. Stark returned to the band again in 2022 and the band released a 6-track EP titled Leviathan the following year, containing a mixture of new material and re-recorded older songs. Nothing Sacred then performed a string of support shows with Metal Church, Udo Dirkschneider and Paul Di'anno on their Australian tours and in 2024. Later that year, the band embarked on their first European tour with an appearance at Headbangers Open Air festival and shows in Germany, Czech Republic, Finland, Latvia, Lithuania, and United Kingdom.

In 2025, the band marked the 40th anniversary of their debut EP Deathwish by performing two shows, one as support to Uli Jon Roth's Melbourne show on 5 September and a co-headline with fellow Melbourne 80s band Persecution on 25 October.

== Band members ==
=== Current members ===
- Joel Henderson - vocals (2024–present)
- Stu Bedford - guitar (2018–present)
- Darin Cherry - guitar (2024–present)
- Sham – drums (1983–present)
- Karl Lean – bass (1983–present)

=== Former members ===
- Mick Burnham – vocals (1983–2012)
- Richard Snape – guitar (1983–1987)
- Mark Woolley – guitar (1983–1987)
- Terry Cameron – guitar (1986–1989)
- Richard Bubica – guitar (1987–1989)
- Ross Percy – guitar (2012–2018)
- Chris Stark – vocals (2015–2020, 2022–2024)
- George Larin – guitar (1986–1987, 2012–2024)

== Discography ==
- Deathwish (EP) (self-release, 1984)
  - Reissued on picture disc in 2015.
- Demo (1985)
- Let Us Prey (album) (Cleopatra Records, 1988)
  - Reissued in 2024 through Diabolical Might Records in Germany with alternate recordings of the Deathwish tracks as bonuses.
- No Gods (album) (Rockshots, 2021)
- Deathwish Boxset (album) (Dies Irae, 2021)
  - Contains the original EP, alternate mixes of such, a bonus disc of demos and a DVD containing a concert in Japan from 2012.
- Leviathan (EP) (Rockshots, 2023)
