= Costa Zouliou =

Australian radio announcer (born 1964)

- Born: 1964 (age 61–62); Melbourne
- Occupation: Radio announcer
- Known for: Triple J radio announcer

Costa Zouliou (born 1964 in Melbourne) is an Australian radio announcer best known for his work at Triple J. Although born in Melbourne, he was raised, and now lives in Brisbane. He is currently working behind-the-scenes and presenting fill-in shifts at radio station ABC Classic FM. He was recently behind a campaign to change the name of the Go Between Bridge in Brisbane to The Go-Betweens Bridge, to correctly refer to the iconic Brisbane band, The Go-Betweens.

He started as the host of a short "What’s Happening" program on Friday, later Saturday nights. He became host of the heavy metal show, Three Hours of Power after Francis Leach moved on. He held this role until 2000, after which he switched to do Drive for a year, followed by his most current role of Weekend Lunch from 2003 until 2005. He then became a sound engineer for ABC "Classic FM" and ABC "Radio National".

Costa has been a member of the management committee of Q Music, the Queensland music industry organisation since April 2004, and is also involved with Straight Out of Brisbane, an annual arts and culture festival in Brisbane.

On 19 December 2018, he will be presenting the first episode of a summer fill-in show on Double J called Rock Up.
