= Taramis =

Australian musical group

- Also known as: Prowler
- Origin: Melbourne, Victoria, Australia
- Genres: Heavy metal, power metal, progressive metal
- Years active: 1981–1993, 2009, 2017
- Labels: Metal for Melbourne, Metal Blade, Rising Sun
- Past members: Shane "Joel" Southby; Craig Robertson; Danny Komorr; Mick "Lights" Cawthan; Andrew Rigo; Joe Cordina; Dave Browne; Evan Harris; George Larin

Taramis was an Australian progressive metal group from Melbourne, Victoria. The band initially formed in 1981 and released two albums before disbanding in 1993.

According to Australian rock music historian Ian McFarlane, Taramis were "one of the first local groups to play a brand of 'progressive' heavy metal in the style of overseas acts".

== History ==
=== Early history (1981–1993) ===
Taramis formed in 1981 under the name of Prowler. The band's first line-up consisted of drummer Joe Cordina, bassist Danny Komorr, guitarists Mick "Lights" Cawthan and Craig Robertson. Vocalist Shane "Joel" Southby joined the band after the group's singer failed to show up at rehearsals. The five-piece performed as a cover band playing songs by Iron Maiden and Manowar before writing on original material. Cawthan was replaced by guitarist Andrew Rigo, who also soon left the band, and Prowler continued as a four-piece while Cawthan continued managing the group. A demo was soon recorded in 1985 titled Blood & Honour, and the band played the 1985 Metal for Melbourne festival. That same year, Cordina was replaced by one-time Nothing Sacred drummer Dave Browne. The band's music began to take on heavier, progressive thrash influences, and Prowler renamed themselves to Taramis after the band's song Riders of Taramis and the Conan the Destroyer character of the same name. The band performed their first show under the new name on New Year's Eve of 1985.

With the new moniker, Taramis played regularly throughout Melbourne, including the 1986 Metal for Melbourne festival in June that year. Later in the year, the band recorded their debut album, Queen of Thieves, which was released on the Metal for Melbourne record label in August 1987. Before the album's release, Komorr was replaced by bassist Evan Harris. The group toured interstate and Queen of Thieves was re-released internationally by Metal Blade, one of the first Australian metal releases to receive international distribution. The album was warmly received in Europe. The band was to support Metallica on their upcoming 1986 tour of Australia, which was cancelled due to the death of Cliff Burton.

Early in 1990, Robertson left Taramis and was replaced by guitarist George Larin (ex-New Religion, Nothing Sacred) on lead guitar. In April 1991 the band released their second album, Stretch of the Imagination through Rising Sun Productions. In 1992, Taramis supported Sepultura and Ian Gillan on the Melbourne dates of their Australian tours and began writing tracks for a third album. Taramis disbanded in 1993 and the album was abandoned.

=== Post-breakup and reunions ===
Shane Southby moved to Sydney and eventually became a member of the Merv Brewer Steel Guitar Band before relocating to New Zealand. George Larin developed his own self-titled project and would rejoin Nothing Sacred in the 2010s. In 2000, Dave Browne joined Clauz, a three-piece metal group who released one album Strict Regime, in 2002. Evan Harris would play bass for numerous Australian metal groups including Black Majesty, Vulvagun, Eyefear and Australian progressive rock musician Steve Turner.

On 6 January 2009 Dave Browne died at the age of 44 years;. Taramis reunited in June 2009 to play a benefit concert in Dave Browne's honour, with Evan Harris, Craig Robertson, George Larin and Chris Phillips (ex-Mass Confusion) on drums. Both of Taramis' albums were re-released that same year through My Graveyard Productions. Taramis reunited again in 2017 for the Metal for Melbourne reunion show with Errol Willenburg (ex-Light Force) on drums.

In 2019, Taramis hinted at possible European shows for 2020 and 2021 from their Facebook page, but these did not eventuate due to the COVID-19 pandemic. Both Taramis albums were re-issued again in 2022 through German label Golden Core Records.

== Discography ==
- Blood & Honour (as Prowler) (1985)
- Queen of Thieves (1987)
- Stretch of the Imagination (1991)

== Members ==
- Shane Southby - vocals (1983–1993, 2009, 2017)
- Dave Browne - drums (1985–1993 d.2009)
- Craig Robertson - guitars (1983–1990, 2009, 2017)
- George Larin - guitars (1988–1993, 2009, 2017)
- Evan Harris - bass (1988–1993, 2009, 2017)
- Mick "Lights" Cawthan - guitars (1983–1984)
- Danny Komorr - bass (1983–1987)
- Joe Cordina - drums (1983–1985)
- Andrew Rigo - guitar (1985)
- Chris Phillips - drums (2009)
- Errol Willenburg - drums (2017)

== Sources ==
- McFarlane, Ian (1999). "Whammo Homepage". Encyclopedia of Australian Rock and Pop. St Leonards, NSW: Allen & Unwin. ISBN 1-86508-072-1. Archived from the original on 5 April 2004. Note: Archived [on-line] copy has limited functionality.
