= Segression =

Australian metal band

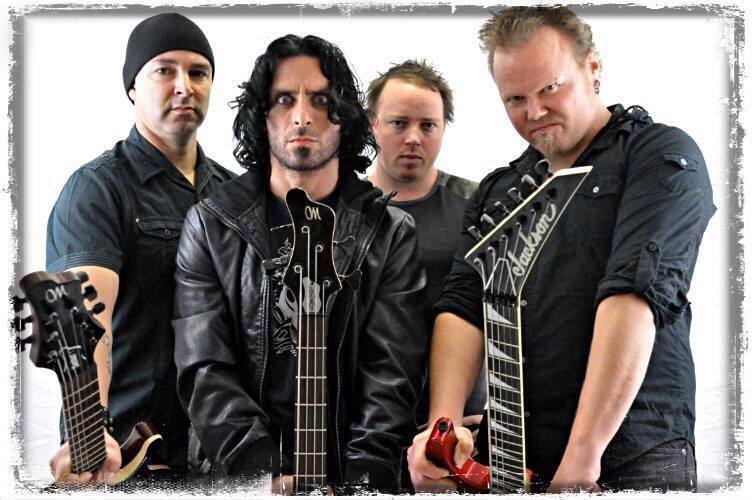
- Promo shot in 2014

Background information
- Also known as: Eezee (early 1990s)
- Origin: Wollongong, New South Wales, Australia
- Genres: Groove metal; nu metal; thrash metal
- Years active: 1996–2003, 2009–present
- Labels: Oracle, Roadrunner, Murder Machine, Warner
- Members: Adam Bunnell; Michael Katselos; Chris Rand; Damon Bishop
- Past members: James Broadbent; John Buckley; Adrian Herbert; Keith Owen; Shane Partridge/>Sven Sellin

Segression are an Australian heavy metal band formed in Wollongong, New South Wales, in 1990 as Eezee. Their 2000 album Smile is one of the best-selling metal albums released in Australia, despite their wariness toward the music industry. Their latest album, Painted in Blood, featured cover art by painter Rev Myers and was self-released in 2014. The band reformed in 2026, with guitarist Damon Bishop replacing Sven Sellin, for their 30th anniversary. They released a best-of album on May 5, 2026.

== History ==
=== Early years ===
Originally known as Eezee, the band had recorded an EP in 1993 and the 1995 album Rise from Darkness. The group had also played support shows with Morbid Angel, Machine Head, and Deicide. The line-up at this time was Christiaan Rand (bass, vocals), Sven Sellin (guitar), James Broadbent (guitar), and John Buckley (drums).

The group decided to change its name after moving into in a thrash direction in mid-1994. Formed from a conjunction of the words "segregated" and "aggression" (which was later a track on the fourth album), Segression announced its new name on New Year's Day 1996 and played its first show, at the Cambridge Hotel in Newcastle, a few weeks later. By this time, Broadbent had been replaced by Shane Partridge. Some of Broadbent's playing appears on the first album, which was already underway. A show in Sydney with Fear Factory and a rigid touring schedule that took in several centres in regional New South Wales followed. L.I.A., an abbreviation for lesson in aggression, was released in October 1996.

In 1997, Segression continued to tour solidly, featuring on several shows of Mortal Sin's comeback tour at the same time as working on its second album. Fifth of the Fifth took its name from a prediction that the world would end on 5 May 2000 and was released in September. The album consolidated the band's success on the Australian metal scene and also saw the introduction of the nu metal elements into their music.

During 1998, the group played a national support tour with Ozzy Osbourne and late in the year Buckley was asked to leave due to personal issues, opening the door to Adrian Herbert. Segression toured with Strapping Young Lad soon after, and with this new line-up, Segression then headlined one of the first annual Australian Metal Festivals Metal for the Brain. Then the band toured nationally with Fear Factory, and toured most of Australia doing their own shows or playing smaller festivals. The later part of 1999 was spent writing and recording a new album and playing live rarely.

=== 2000s ===
The early part of 2000 was spent touring with Soulfly which culminated in Chris being asked to perform the song "Bleed" with Soulfly at the Sydney Big Day Out. The Smile album surfaced in early 2000 during a national tour with Slipknot. The album was released to critical acclaim on Roadrunner Records' Australian development label Dark Carnival. The relationship with Roadrunner soured almost immediately and Segression was forced to do virtually all of the promotion for the album itself but due to the hugely successful tour with Slipknot, the Smile album went on to become the most successful of their career, and to this date it is still one of the highest-selling metal albums released in Australia. Segression toured extensively behind the "Smile" album and in fact were voted Best live band, Best Guitarist and Best Vocalist in a public poll held in a high-profile music magazine. After being announced as part of that year's Metal for the Brain festival, Segression decided to withdraw from the show, instead announcing a move to the United States after a final near sold-out Australian tour .

Segression moved to Chicago in early 2001 and played some club shows on their own as well as with Hatebreed and Shadows Fall. Although these shows were a success they were mainly there to write and record new material which ended in a week-long recording session at Chicago's Groove Master Studios where Disturbed and Sevendust had recorded albums. They returned to Australia in May to tour nationally with Pantera and Corrosion of Conformity. Adrian was relieved of his duties as he could not play in time nor to the caliber required and was replaced by Keith Owen.

June 2002 saw the release of the band's fourth album Segression. After a particularly large touring schedule for the album, Segression played a final show in December in Wollongong NSW. After the show the band had gone into the studio to record a follow-up album. This album took a new direction, putting Segression in an unofficial hiatus.

=== 2003: Side Effect X and hiatus ===
In late 2003, Segression announced that the band was on indefinite hold. With the addition of bass player Michael Caruana, all members of Segression created Side Effect X, a melodic heavy rock band. The new band was announced during the 2003 Musicoz Awards and participated in the 2004 Live 'n Local unsigned bands competition on Channel Ten's Video Hits. That group released a single, "Turn the Page" and an album called Life featuring music videos for the songs "Get Off Me", "Waste of Time" and "Golden Skies". After a few shows and a small push by the band for this album they decided to go their separate ways, leaving both Side Effect X and Segression up in the air with no plans for either band to tour or play shows again.

Since the disbandment of Side Effect X, "Life" has been subsequently included within Segression's discography.

=== 2009: Return and current ===
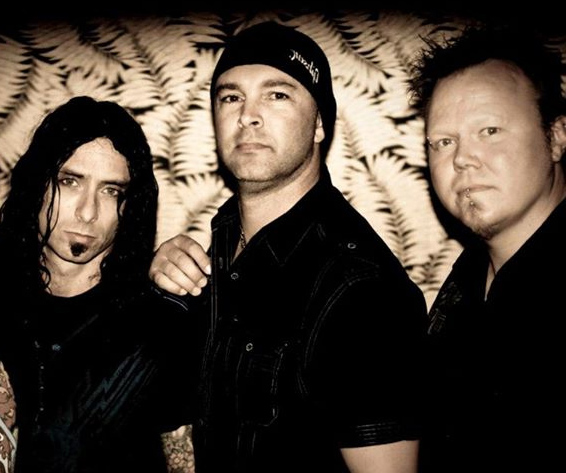
The band in 2014

In mid-2009 a new Myspace and Facebook page became active, and rumours went around that the band was back together. This was later confirmed with an official Facebook page post stating that singer/bass Player Chris Rand, guitarist Shane Partridge and drummer Adrian had in fact reformed the band and in October 2009 the band announced on their Myspace that they will be playing a return show at Sydney's Gaelic Club. Segression's return show on 30 November 2009 was completely sold out.

After the success of this show the band decided to return full-time adding guitarist Michael Katselos (Fozzy) with long term guitarist Sven Sellin opting out of the reformation (as he was concentrating on his two other bands, Veil and Sentient). In November 2010 Segression were confirmed as the "Special Guests" on the December 2010 Australian east coast tour by Fozzy which features WWE star Chris Jericho and Stuck Mojo guitarist Rich Ward.

A new album titled "Never Dead" was released through Riot/Warner on 22 April 2011 and was preceded by a special iTunes only single, "Hero Anthem" on 18 March 2011 which debuted at #2. According to the band's Facebook and Myspace postings," this album is just us being us completely" and it was produced by singer/bassist Chris Rand. "Never Dead" received positive reviews and was a commercial success, reaching Number 1 on iTunes charts and selling out in retail outlets. The band then proceeded to play selected shows to great crowds, although the number of shows has been limited.

The music video for "Blood Lace Black Day" was ranked #21 in the ABC's RAGE top 50 clips of 2011.

In 2012, Former guitarist Sven Sellin returned to the band, replacing Shane Partridge.

In January 2013 the band started recording their 6th studio album 'Painted in Blood'. However production hit a hurdle when then drummer Adrian Herbert was unable to play in line with Segression's more aggressive style.

In early 2014, Segression concluded they needed a drummer that could play the new material. Sven's long time friend Adam (Adz) Bunnell, who also plays drums in Sven's other bands (Veil/Fuelled Within/Raising Bodhi) replaced Adrian and jumped at the opportunity to play the band's new powerful and dynamic sound. He wasted no time and started recording drums for the new album immediately.

In March 2014, with all the songs completed and recorded, the album moved into the final stages of mixing and mastering. With a release expected for the beginning of Spring, 'Painted in Blood' was set to be the band's most "solid, ultra tight, bone crushing" album ever released.

In late September 2014 the band announced a release date of 4 October, but a few days later had to push the album back to its official release date of Friday 10 October. Presale orders for the album started on 27 September.

The music video for the opening title track of the album was released on 7 November.

== Discography ==
L.I.A.

- Released: 1996
- Format: CD
- Label: Oracle (Australia)

Fifth of the Fifth

- Released: 1997
- Format: CD
- Label: Oracle(Australia)

Smile

- Released: 2000
- Format: CD
- Label: Dark Carnival/Roadrunner (Australia)
- Singles: Gone

Segression

- Released: 2002
- Format: CD
- Label: Murder Machine (Australia)

Life (Formerly of Side Effect X, now regarded as a Segression album.)

- Released: 2004
- Format: CD
- Label: Murder Machine (Australia)

Never Dead

- Released: 22 April 2011
- Format: CD
- Label: Warner
- Producer: Chris Rand
- Chart position: n/a
- Sales: n/a
- Certification: n/a
- Singles: Hero Anthem

Painted in Blood

- Released: 10 October 2014
- Format: CD
- Label: Murder Machine Records (Australia)
- Singles: Scar Me Now
