= Armoured Angel =

Australian thrash and death metal band

- Also known as: Metal Asylum
- Origin: Canberra, Australia
- Genres: Thrash metal; death metal
- Years active: 1982–1996; 1998–1999
- Labels: Id/Polygram; Warhead
- Past members: Glen "Lucy" Luck; Rowan Powell; Dave Davis; Rick Wayy; Russell Ruszinski; Tony Sheaffe; Joel Green; Matt Green; Yuri Ward; Steve Luff

Armoured Angel were an Australian thrash and death metal band from Canberra, formed in 1982 as Metal Asylum. The band's founding mainstay, Glen "Lucy" Luck, played bass guitar. They pushed the boundaries of the local thrash metal scene and pioneered Australian death metal. The group helped establish Australia's metal festival, Metal for the Brain, in 1991. They issued a studio album, Angel of the Sixth Order, in July 1999 before disbanding soon after.

== History ==
Armoured Angel were formed in 1982 as Metal Asylum by Glen "Lucy" Luck on bass guitar and Rowan Powell on guitars. The band was renamed Armoured Angel in 1984, with drummer Dave Davis and vocalist Rick Wayy completing the line-up. After recording a demo, Baptism in Blood, in 1985, Powell and Wayy were replaced with Tony Sheaffe on guitar and Russell Ruszinski on vocals.

Armoured Angel underwent another line-up change in 1986, reforming as a trio with Luck joined by brothers Joel Green (drums, vocals) and Matt Green (guitar). This line-up recorded a second demo, Wings of Death, in Easter 1989, which gained a strong fan base. A third demo, Communion, was released in 1990. An Australian east coast tour followed, plus a re-release of Wings of Death on English record label CCG in 1991. In 1991, Joel Green organised the Metal for the Brain festival as a benefit concert for his friend, Alec Hurley, who had been assaulted in 1990 and rendered brain-damaged and disabled. The group continued to organise the annual festival until 1996.

Armoured Angel released their first EP, Stigmartyr, in December 1992 through Id Records, a developmental arm of Polygram. The band supported Morbid Angel on their Australian tour that year. Australian heavy metal magazine Hot Metal awarded a five out of five review for the EP. In January 1993, the band appeared at the Big Day Out festival in Sydney and supported Carcass and Bolt Thrower on their respective Australian tours. The band's second EP, Mysterium, was released in April 1994. A short tour of the United Kingdom and a headlining show in Germany followed in 1995.

After returning to Australia, Jaz Coleman (of Killing Joke) began producing Armoured Angel's album, in Sydney's Powerhouse Studios in 1996. That year, Armoured Angel featured at the Melbourne leg of the Big Day Out festival tour. The band split shortly after and the album was never released. Luck reformed Armoured Angel in 1998 with guitarist and vocalist Yuri Ward (of Psychrist) and drummer Steven Luff. In July 1999, their debut album, Angel of the Sixth Order, was released on Sydney's Warhead Records. This short-lived incarnation of Armoured Angel split late in 1999 after Warhead Records closed and Luff departed.

According to Australian musicologist Ian McFarlane, Armoured Angel's "earliest influences included UK bands such as Motorhead and Venom." They pushed the boundaries of the local thrash metal scene and pioneered Australian death metal.

== Aftermath ==
After Armoured Angel disbanded, Luck performed a short stint in Canberra death metal band Reign of Terror. Ward continued work with Psychrist, also performing as a live member of Lord Kaos, and later formed death and thrash metallers Kill for Satan. Joel Green currently performs for doom metallers Witchskull. Luck and the Green brothers reunited in late 2006 to remaster their back catalogue, including a 1996 pre-production demo of the band's shelved album, Hymns of Hate. A compilation album featuring all of the 1987-1996 line-up's material was released in 2013.

== Members ==
- Glen "Lucy" Luck – bass guitar (1982–1996, 1998–1999)
- Rowan Powell – guitars (1982–1985)
- Dave Davis – drums (1984–1985)
- Rick Wayy – vocals (1984–1985)
- Russell Ruszinski – vocals (1985–1986)
- Tony Sheaffe – guitar (1985–1986)
- Joel Green – drums, vocals (1986–1996)
- Matt Green – guitar (1986–1996)
- Steve Luff – drums (1998–1999)
- Yuri Ward – guitar, vocals (1998–1999)

== Discography ==
Wings of Death

- Released: 1991
- Format: 7" vinyl
- Label: CCG (England)

Stigmartyr

- Released: 1992
- Format: CD
- Label: Id/Polygram (Australia)

Mysterium

- Released: 1994
- Format: CD
- Label: Id/Polygram (Australia)

Angel of the Sixth Order

- Released: 1999
- Format: CD
- Label: Warhead Records (Australia)

== Demo Recordings ==
Baptism in Blood

- Released: 1985
- Format: Cassette
- Label: Self-released (Australia)

Wings of Death

- Released: 1989
- Format: Cassette
- Label: Self-released (Australia)

Communion

- Released: 1990
- Format: Cassette
- Label: Self-released (Australia)
