= Cryogenic (band) =

Australian thrash metal/death metal band

- Origin: Wetherill Park, New South Wales, Australia
- Genres: Death metal, thrash metal
- Years active: 1992–2001
- Labels: Warhead Records, Extreme Music Australia
- Spinoffs: In the Name Of
- Past members: Steve Essa; Darren Jenkins; Anthony Henning; Steve Simmons; Russell Player; Darren Maloney; Chad Bartosik
- Website: http://www.myspace.com/cryogenic

Cryogenic were an Australian thrash metal and death metal band formed in 1992 in Wetherill Park, a Sydney suburb.

== History ==
=== Early ===
The band originally featured guitarist Steve Essa, bassist Anthony Henning, singer/guitarist Russell Player and drummer Chad Bartosik, who was a member of thrash band Neophobia. Cryogenic's history is linked to Sydney thrash/groove metal band Mortality, which was formed around the same time by guitarist Darren Jenkins, bass player Luke Ford and vocalist Darren Maloney. Mortality released three demos and toured with Sepultura before Jenkins was replaced with Craig Figl and drummer Rick Fuda with Steve Pell, previously of late-80s metal band Kilswitch. Mortality's activity stalled due to a delay in the release of their debut album, Structure. While it was eventually released in early 1997, dispute about musical direction saw Mortality disband six months later.

=== Demo ===
Cryogenic released its first demo in 1995. However Bartosik left before the band could capitalise on its success on the local Sydney metal scene. Temporary drummer Grahame Goode from Neophobia played with the band on a key support date with Belgian thrash band Channel Zero but without a permanent drummer Cryogenic was on the verge of splitting up. Late in the year, Mortality's ex-guitarist Jenkins joined the band as drummer, enabling them to support Fear Factory in mid-1996 before beginning work on a debut album, Suspended Animation in early 1997. At the same time, the band deliberately cultivated a following amongst the "Westy" headbangers of Sydney's western suburbs. In a further link to Jenkins' former band, in the aftermath to the disbanding of Mortality, Player was then replaced by that band's vocalist Darren Maloney, who re-recorded the album's vocal parts just prior to release.

=== Late 1990s ===
Cryogenic appeared with Strapping Young Lad and then Cradle of Filth in late 1997; this began a string of tours and opening slots for the band that included a tour with Entombed and shows in South Africa, England and Germany to promote Suspended Animation. This was followed by an Australian tour with Slayer.

In November 1998 the band appeared at Metal for the Brain for the first time. They would go on to play twice more at Australia's largest heavy metal music festival.

In 1999 Cryogenic played at the Sydney Big Day Out and late in the year released their second album, ego-noria. 2000 featured heavy touring around Australia including the Big Day Out once again. After a third Big Day Out appearance in 2001 Cryogenic went off the road for much of the year, ostensibly to work on another album. However, in October it was announced that Maloney had been replaced by Steve Simmons, formerly with Canberra nu metal band Henry's Anger. Plans were then made for the band to relocate to the United States with tentative plans made for shows in Los Angeles. However, Simmons was injured in a car accident and was forced to leave the band.

=== In The Name Of ===
The remainder of Cryogenic then based themselves in Los Angeles and re-launched itself under the name of In The Name Of after recruiting vocalist Ryan David. That band broke up in early 2005, with Jenkins returning to Australia. He now works as a producer and sound engineer. Maloney, Ford and Pell reformed Mortality in late 2005 with guitarist Andrew Lilley, a former member of Psi.Kore, Infernal Method and Atomizer. The band played a single comeback show in Sydney in August 2006, with no plans to continue further at the time. Mortality were reported to have begun writing and rehearsing once more as of mid-2007, but no new material has surfaced to date.

== Discography ==
Suspended Animation

- Released: October, 1997
- Format: CD
- Label: Warhead
- Producer: Tony Jarrett and Cryogenic

ego-noria

- Released: 1999
- Format: CD
- Label: Extreme Music Australia (EMA)
- Producer: Cryogenic

== Video releases ==
- Cold Cuts '97 (VHS) 1997
