= Addictive (Australian band) =

Australian thrash metal band

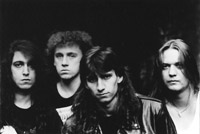
- The band in 1990

Background information
- Origin: Blacktown, New South Wales, Australia
- Genres: Thrash metal
- Years active: 1987–1996
- Labels: Survival / Forge / Shock
- Past members: Joe Buttigeig; Greg Smith; Matt Coffey; Mick Sultana; Steve Moore

Addictive were an Australian thrash metal band formed in 1987. The original line-up was Joe Buttigieg on guitar, Greg Smith on lead vocals and bass guitar, and Matt Coffey on drums. In February 1988, Mick Sultana was recruited on lead guitar. They released two studio albums, Pity of Man (November 1989) and Kick 'Em Hard (January 1993). In July 1990 Steve More (ex-Enticer) had replaced Coffey on drums. They were influenced by Metallica, Sacred Reich and Nuclear Assault. Addictive disbanded in 1996. In 2004 both Buttigieg and Sultana joined a reformation of fellow thrash metallers, Mortal Sin.

== History ==
Addictive were formed in 1987 in Blacktown by Greg Smith (vocals and bass guitar) and Joe Buttigieg (guitar), with Matt Coffey (drums) joining soon after. They expanded to a quartet when Mick Sultana (guitar) joined in February of the following year. In October 1988 they recorded a five-track extended play, Ward 74, which was released by the end of that year. The group completed a tour of Sydney, Newcastle and Canberra.

Their first studio album, Pity of Man was released in November 1989 on the Survival label. Justin Gaines of Hardrock Haven felt it was "a harsher, more Kreator meets Testament raw energy, which works very well." Australian musicologist, Ian McFarlane, noticed that "It revealed the band's heavily Metallica/Flotsam & Jetsam/Sacred Reich-influenced style."

Steve Moore (previously of Enticer) replaced Coffey on drums in July 1990. By September they had signed with Rattlesnake through Normal Records for European distribution of their debut album. In June 1991 they supported a gig by Motörhead at the Hordern Pavilion. Addictive's second album, Kick 'Em Hard, was recorded in 1991 with producer, Bob Daisley. The master tapes for the album went missing for over 18 months – it was finally released in February 1993 – by which time the band had fallen from favour. Gaines rated the album as 8.5 out of 10 observing that it was "still full-on thrash metal but had a more polished sound" despite changes in musical trends. Both albums were remastered, expanded and issued as a 2×CD compilation, Kick 'Em Hard (Rebooted Edition), in 2015 on the Divebomb label – the writers of Hardrock Haven voted it as one of the top 10 albums of that year.

Addictive continued to play live infrequently, but finally broke up in 1996. A short time later, Moore joined Dungeon. In 2004, guitarists Buttigieg and Sultana joined the reformed line up of fellow Sydney thrash band, Mortal Sin, although Buttigieg left that group early in the following year.

== Media ==
- Official Video Clip: "Crazy Train" (Featuring Bob Daisley)

== Discography ==
=== Studio albums ===
- Pity of Man (Survival, November 1989)
- Kick 'Em Hard (Survival, February 1993)

=== Compilation album ===
- Kick 'Em Hard (Rebooted Edition) (Divebomb, 2015)
