= Sadistik Exekution =

Australian extreme metal band

- Origin: Sydney, Australia
- Genres: Death metal, black metal, war metal
- Years active: 1985–2004; 2009
- Label: Various
- Past members: Rok; Dave Slave; Kriss Hades; Sloth; Matt "Skitz" Sanders; Sandy Vahdanni; Steve "The Mechanik" Hoban

Sadistik Exekution was an Australian extreme metal band from Sydney. The band formed in 1985, and was mainly active from 1986 until 2004. Known for their live shows and non-conformism, Sadistik Exekution wrote, recorded and performed extreme death metal. The band members have stated they should not be confused labelled as "black metal". The band influenced some early Scandinavian black metal bands, and other extreme metal bands from around the world. Their last official live show was in Sydney in 1999, but reunited in November 2009, to perform as the main act at the first annual Australian Metal Awards in Sydney.

== History ==
=== Early years ===
The band came together after bass player Dave Slave met vocalist Rok in Sydney in May 1985. For the rest of the year and the first half of 1986, Dave and Rok rehearsed with different guitarists and drummers and began writing material. However, the problem of finding musicians capable of playing extreme metal seemed ongoing. Dave Slave and Rok temporarily relocated to Melbourne through the middle of 1986.

During this period, Slave appeared on the talent-quest segment of Australian TV program Hey Hey It's Saturday, and after playing a bass solo, he threw his BC Rich bass guitar to the floor, breaking it beyond repair. Around this time, they met future guitarist Rev. Kriss Hades. Slave and Rok returned to Sydney in September 1986, leaving Hades behind.

At the same time, former Slaughter Lord guitarist Sandy Vahdani had been rehearsing with a drummer called Sloth. Sloth was distantly related to Dave Slave and both Sandy and Dave had been in Sydney thrash band Hammer's Thrust. By the end of September, the four formed Sadistik Exekution and began writing songs that would be recorded on the band's debut album. Before the end of 1986, they planned to include Rev. Kriss Hades in the line up as a five-piece act, but this didn't happen.

While the band rehearsed and wrote material, Dave Slave and Rok pursued local publicity, while Rok began corresponding with members of the Norwegian and Swedish black metal scenes. Euronymous from Mayhem can be seen wearing one of the band's t-shirts in several photographs from the late 1980s and early 90s and Rok was also in contact with Jon 'Metalion' Kristiansen of Slayer magazine. Rok corresponded with Quorthon of Bathory and a other bands and individuals who became well known.

They came close to playing live in Sydney from 1987 to 1989. In March 1988, the band recorded The Magus album while problems delayed their progress. After many delays and difficulties, The Magus album was released in June 1991 by Sydney label Vampire Records.

That year, they first played live in Sydney and Melbourne. Sandy left the band after The Magus recording sessions. Rev. Kriss Hades moved to Sydney and became a full-time member in 1989. They established themselves as a live act during 1991, with onstage fighting and crowd violence. Despite their appearance and manner, the songs remained at the heart of their shows and recordings.

=== We Are Death ===
In 1993, Sloth left the band after they had recorded most of the material for their second album. Drummer Steve 'The Mechanik' Hoban played on the track "Astral Abortis". A demo tape featuring the core songs of the album was sent to French label Osmose Productions. Intended to be called 'Spiritual Dynamix', the words We Are Death... Fukk You! were printed on the demo tapes. This was a reaction to being labelled a black metal band. The label mistook these words for the title of the album and released it as such. It became a successful release for the label, and in 1995, the band was flown to Europe to tour with Finnish band Impaled Nazarene and American act Absu.

The Mechanik had injured his weeks before the tour, resulting in an extended stay in a Sydney hospital's spinal injuries unit. He was unable to play drums, and the band searched for a replacement.

Melbourne-based drummer Matt 'Skitz' Sanders from the band Damaged was recruited and rushed into rehearsals for the tour. After the first few dates, the other Sadistik Exekution members were behaving unprofessionally. With only a few more dates to be played in Italy and Germany, Dave Slave, Kriss Hades and Rok fought and damaged the tour bus. After a while, the bus stopped while tour management and bus drivers decided how to deal with the situation. The tour proceeded, although guitarist Kriss Hades struggled to play with a broken finger. Upon returning to Australia, Sadistik Exekution ceased activity for several months while Hades recovered. The band's behaviour during this tour meant they were never invited to return to Europe for any further tours or live shows for the remainder of the decade and beyond.

=== K.A.O.S. ===
With Sloth back in the band, Sadistik Exekution spent most of 1996 working on their third album, KAOS, initially released through Australian label Shock Records in May 1997. The mini EP Sadistik Elektrokution was released by Shock Records in 1998, featuring remixed versions of previous songs and a bass solo.

KAOS was rereleased in 1998 by Osmose Productions. This version had a few small differences in the artwork and layout. Faster and rawer, this album was the beginning of an active period for the band, with a stream of live performances and other projects. Dave Slave had been working on an electronic rock n' roll album for several years, releasing it under the name Digital Fiction in 1998 through Brisbane distributor Oracle. Rok recorded two solo albums, with Osmose releasing the first, This is Satanik, in 1998, and Melbourne's Modern Invasion Music releasing the second, Burning Metal, in 2000. Rev. Kriss Hades temporarily joined Sydney black metal band Nazxul, recording and playing live. Sloth recorded a series of demos, mainly consisting of punk rock songs under the name Bog.

At the end of 1998, shortly after Rok had performed a solo show, Sadistik Exekution reconvened to play a New Year's Eve show. It was billed as their last show, but the band had advertised their performances this way before. In 1999, they played at Sydney's Globe Theatre in the suburb of Newtown. It was the band's last live performance. The band was inactive for the rest of the year. Hades toured with Nazxul and the others worked on personal projects. Kriss Hades began putting together his solo debut.

The band maintained that it had ended as a live act, but when the line-up for the year 2000 Metal for the Brain festival in Canberra was announced, Sadistik Exekution was billed as a headliners. Anticipation among fans was high that the band was appearing at Australia's biggest metal event, but Dave Slave broke his leg weeks before the show and the band withdrew.

=== Final recordings ===
Two more Sadistik Exekution albums were recorded. The first, Fukk, was released in 2002. The second, Fukk II, followed 18 months later. Dave Slave has claimed that the band is over, claiming to be busy with his solo act Doomed and Disgusting and other pursuits. Kriss Hades is a solo artist, producing an album of noise and dark ambience in 2002. He also works as an underground illustration artist. Rok moved into the art world and became an illustrator for other heavy metal bands and labels. Sloth distanced himself from the other Sadistik Exekution members. He continued to play as a session drummer with various low key rock and metal bands around the local Australian live pub and club circuit.

Sadistik Exekution made a live return in November 2009 as the featured act at the Australian Metal Awards in Sydney. Leading up to the event, Rok was interviewed on radio station JJJ's heavy metal show 'The Racket' with Andrew Haug. He spoke at length of his adventures and the upcoming live performance. During the interview, Rok made no comments about Sadistik Exekution recording further albums. Later that month, they appeared to a capacity crowd at Sydney's Fox Studios for the Australian Heavy Metal awards night, where they had the last spot for the night.

The band has declined invitations to perform at various events and festivals in Australia and Europe. Founding members Rok and Slave have continued to work together with post-band business activities, including merchandise, label, and legal matters.

== Discography ==
=== Albums ===
The Magus

- Released: 1991, 2001
- Format: LP, CD
- Label: Vampire (Australia), Osmose (France)

We Are Death... Fukk You!

- Released: 1994
- Format: LP, CD
- Label: Osmose (France)

K.A.O.S.

- Released: 1997, 1998
- Format: CD
- Label: Shock (Australia), Osmose (France)
- Singles: "Sadistik Elektrokution"

Fukk

- Released: 2002
- Format: CD
- Label: Osmose (France)

Fukk II

- Released: 2004
- Format: CD
- Label: Osmose (France)

=== Singles ===
Demon With Wings

- Released: 1996
- Format: CD
- Label: Osmose (France)
- Tracks: Proxima Centauri, Demon With Wings

"Sadistik Elektrokution" from the album K.A.O.S.

- Released: 1998
- Format: CD
- Label: Shock (Australia)
- Tracks: Sadistik Elektrokution, Voltage by Sadism, Bastard Bass
