= Bestial Warlust =

Australian extreme metal band

Bestial Warlust is an Australian war metal band formed in Melbourne in 1990.

== History ==
The band started as Corpse Molestation, playing black/death metal and releasing five demos and one demo compilation. Their lyrics involved death, war and blasphemy. The band used pseudonyms. They were a pioneer of Australian black metal and extreme metal, recording two black/death metal albums in the mid-nineties before breaking up. Their raw style took off from the old-school black metal of Bathory, Sarcófago, Beherit, and Blasphemy. Many members of Bestial Warlust went on to form Deströyer 666 and participate in other Australian extreme metal acts.

In November 2019, the group announced a show at the Croxton Bandroom in Melbourne. Announced for 31 October 2020, it was delayed to March 2021, and later to 11 September that year, due to the COVID-19 pandemic, before being cancelled.

== Band members ==
=== Line-up ===
- Marcus Hellcunt - drums (1993-1997)
- Joe Logiudice - guitar, vocals (1993-1997)
- Damon Burr - vocals (1993-1997)

=== Former members ===
- Philip Gresik - bass
- Chris Wild - bass
- Bradley Chung- drums (1990-1992)
- Jordy - guitar
- Keith Bemrose - guitar, vocals (1993-1994)
- Andrew Gillon - bass (1996)

== Discography ==
- Vengeance War Till Death (1994)
- Blood & Valour (1995)
- Promo 1993 [One track] (1993)
- Promo 1995 (1995)
- Satan's Fist (1998)
- The Blackend Vol. 1 (Black metal compilation album featuring "Satanic", From Vengeance War Till Death
- The Blackend Vol. 2 (Black metal compilation album featuring "Orgy Of Souls" From Blood & Valour
- Headbangers Against Disco Vol. 1 (Split album with: Sabbat, Gehennah and Infernö, 1997)
