= Hobbs' Angel of Death =

Australian thrash metal band

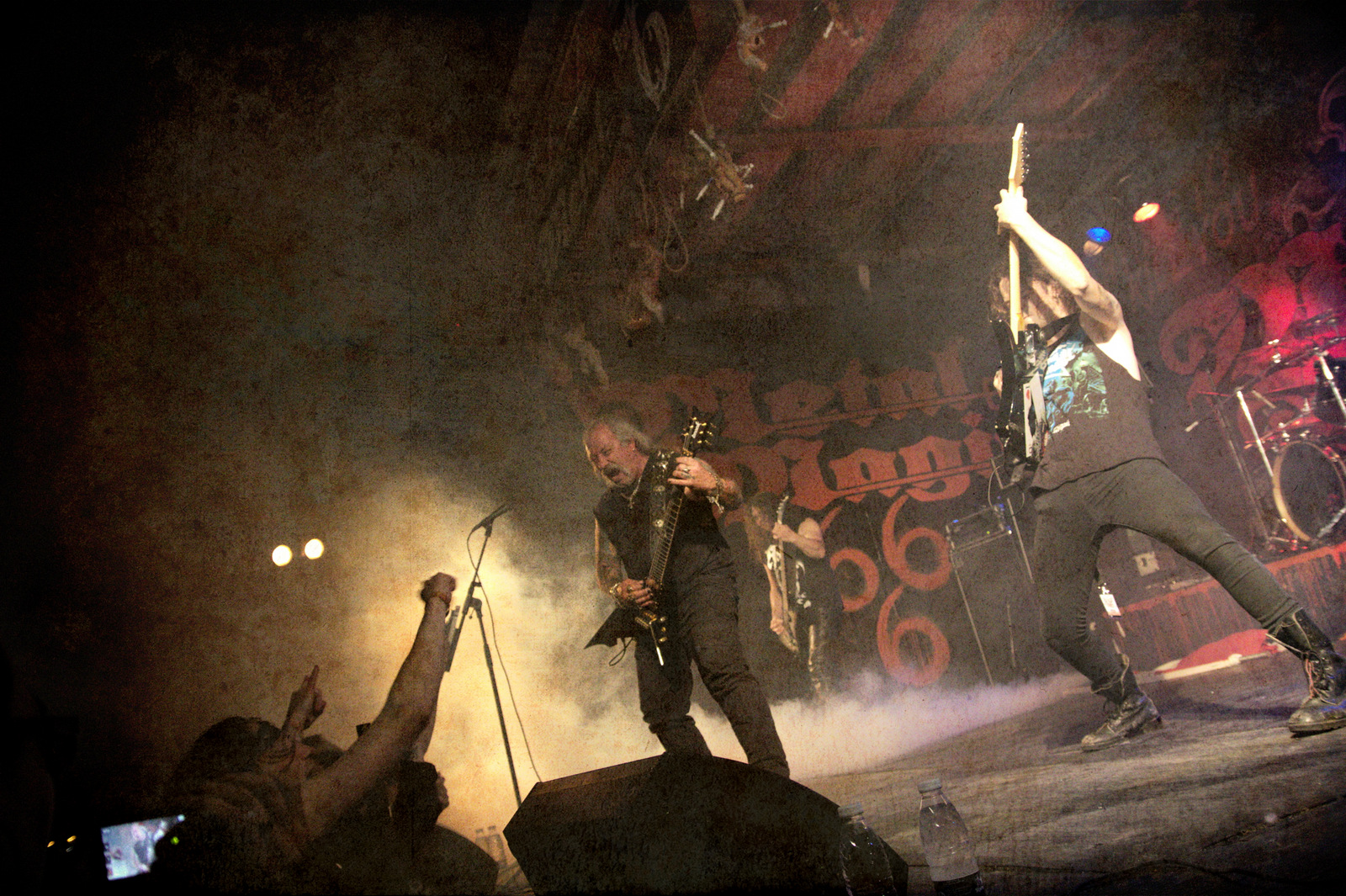
- Hobbs Angel of Death in 2013

Background information
- Origin: Melbourne, Australia
- Genre: Thrash metal
- Years active: 1987–1996, 2002–2019
- Labels: Modern Invasion, Steamhammer, Def
- Past members: Alessio "Cane" Medici; Simon Wizén; Damiano "Idda" Porciani; Brandon Gawith; Peter Hobbs; Mark Woolley; Nick Maltezos; Sham Littleman; Darren McMaster-Smith; Bruno Canziani; Nuclear Exterminator; Philip Gresik; Karl Lean; Dave Frew; Jason Saunders; Rob Molica; Jay Sanders; Brian Sinclair; Jim Sinclair; Elliot Bell; Homa King; James Caldwell; Bo Remy

Hobbs' Angel of Death was an Australian thrash metal band formed in Melbourne in 1987, and one of the first Australian groups in that genre. They released two studio albums, Hobbs' Angel of Death (1988) and Inheritance (1995), before disbanding in 1996. They reformed in 2002 and released the compilation Hobbs' Satan's Crusade (2003), and a third album, Heaven Bled (2016).

== History ==
Hobbs' Angel of Death was formed in January 1987 in Melbourne, as ex-Tyrus guitarist Peter Hobbs' solo project. With ex-Nothing Sacred members Karl Lean (bass guitar), Sham Littleman (drums), and Mark Woolley (guitar), the band recorded two demos, Angel of Death and Virgin Metal Invasion from Down Under, which attracted interest from overseas labels. They are one of the first Australian groups to perform European-style thrash metal.

Although playing traditional thrash metal, Hobbs described his band's sound as "virgin metal" – a pure form of metal music.

In February and March 1988, they recorded their debut self-titled album, Hobbs' Angel of Death, at Musiclab studios in Berlin. Produced by Harris Johns, it was released in July on German label Steamhammer Records, and "became a best-seller in Europe". The line-up for the album was Hobbs and Woolley with bassist Philip Gresik and drummer Darren McMaster-Smith. In 1989, Hobbs and Woolley with Bruno Canziani (drums) and Dave Frew (bass) began touring. Frew and Canziani were two-thirds of the band Rampage, which disbanded in 1988 due to singer-guitarist George Mitrov's conversion to Christianity and denouncing metal music as "demonic".

A second album, Inheritance, was released in 1995, but failed to repeat the success of its predecessor and was an Australia-only release that was difficult to obtain elsewhere. The band had "emerged from the darkness with a poorly produced second" album. Hobbs' Angel of Death broke up after its release.

In 2002, Hobbs reformed the band and released a compilation album of two early demos. The band toured Europe, including an appearance at Wacken Festival, and shows with German thrash group Destruction and black metal act Mayhem. In July 2003, keyboardist Talie Helene, who never recorded nor played live with Hobbs' Angel of Death, left to form her own band, Stone Maiden. Hobbs, Canziani, and Frew remained.

In 2011, Hobbs' Angel of Death supported Forbidden in Sydney on their Australian tour, and played a small number of live shows before embarking on several European tours throughout 2012 and 2013. In August 2014, Peter Hobbs appeared in the Australian documentary Metal Down Under. Hobbs Angel of Death toured the US later that year.

Hobbs' Angel of Death released their third album, Heaven Bled, in 2016, and continued to tour Europe. In 2018, further touring was cancelled due to Hobbs' health issues. The band did not play again until 2019, at Heathen Fest in Southern New South Wales. It would be Hobbs' final live appearance.

Hobbs died on 21 October 2019, at the age of 58. A tribute concert was organised in Melbourne on 29 November. It consisted of a live performance of Hobbs' material from Tyrus and Angel of Death by former bandmates and friends.

== Members ==
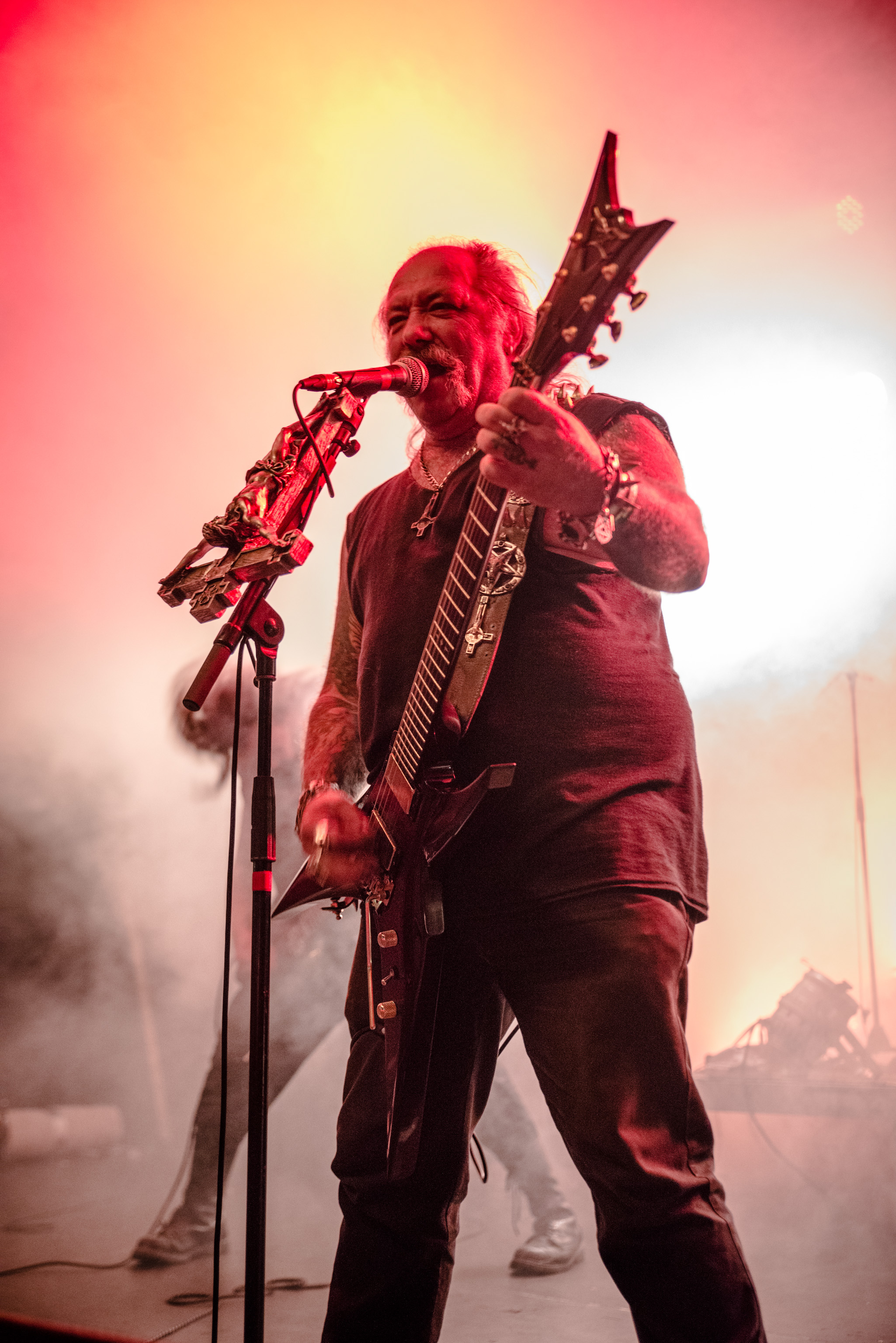
Peter Hobbs performing in 2014

=== Final lineup ===
- Peter Hobbs – vocals, rhythm guitar (died 2019)
- Simon Wizén – lead guitar
- Alessio "Cane" Medici – bass
- Brandon Gawith – drums

=== Past members ===
- Lead guitar – Damiano "Idda" Porciani, Luke Anticevic, Mark Wooley, Nick Maltezos, Jason Saunders, Brian Sinclair, Homa King, James Caldwell
- Drums – Matt "Skitz" Sanders, Sham Littleman, Darren McMaster-Smith, Bruno "Anticros" Canziani, Jarro "Nuclear Exterminator" Raphael, Rob Molica, Jim Sinclair, Elliot Bell, Iago Bruchi
- Bass – Bo Remy, Philip "Bullet Eater" Gresik, Karl Lean, Dave Frew, Jay Sanders

== Discography ==
=== Albums ===
- Hobbs' Angel of Death (Steamhammer Records SHLP 7006, SPV 85-7525, July 1988)
- Inheritance (Def Records, 1995)
- Heaven Bled (2016)

=== Extended plays ===
- Virgin Metal Invasion from Down Under (February 1987)
- Angel of Death (November 1987)

=== Compilations ===
- Demolition – Scream Your Brains Out! (Chain Reaction Records, 1988) – Metal Forces compilation with the songs "Chainsaw Massacre" and "Satan's Crusade"
- Hobbs' Satan's Crusade (Modern Invasion Music MIM7336-2CD, 2003)
