= Set in Stone (Lord album) =

Studio album by Lord
- Released: September 2009
- Recorded: SLS Studios, Wollongong
- Genre: Power metal
- Length: 63:52
- Label: Riot!
- Producer: Lord Tim

Lord chronology
Hear No Evil (2008)	Set in Stone (2009)	Return of the Tyrant (2010)

Professional ratings
Review scores
Source	Rating
The Music	3.5/4

Set in Stone is the third album by the Australian heavy metal band Lord. It was released in September 2009 by the band's own label Dominus in conjunction with Riot! Entertainment. This was the first Lord album with the guitarist Mark Furtner as an official member (he was listed as a guest on Ascendence) and the last for Tim Yatras, who left after it was recorded but before it was released.

== Overview ==
Set in Stone was recorded at the band's studio in Wollongong, Australia, as was Ascendence. As on that album, the pop singer Tania Moran recorded backing vocals for several songs. The Colombian artist Felipe Machado Franco once again designed the art.

Set in Stone was prefaced in late 2008 by the EP Hear No Evil which contained the album's title track. The Kylie Minogue cover "On a Night Like This" from the EP can be found on Set in Stone as a bonus track. A video was made for the song "New Horizons" with footage from the first leg of their 2009 Australian tour that, according to the band, was filmed with a Nokia N95 mobile phone. The song includes a guest guitar solo by Pete Lesperance of Harem Scarem.

"Be My Guest" is an instrumental track featuring guest solos from Craig Goldy of Dio, Glen Drover from Eidolon, Olof Mörck of Dragonland, Yoshiyasu Maruyama of the Japanese thrash band Argument Soul, Angra's Felipe Andreoli, the former Enter Twilight member Richie Hausberger, Chris Porcianko from Vanishing Point, Chris Brooks and former Dungeon members Stu Marshall and Justin Sayers. It was co-written by the ex-Dungeon bass guitarist Brendon McDonald.

== Track listing ==
No.	Title	Writer(s)	Length
1.	"Spectres of the Ascendant"	Tim Grose	0:48
2.	"Redemption"	Tim Grose/Tim Yatras	5:31
3.	"100 Reasons"	Tim Grose/Tim Yatras	4:44
4.	"Eternal Storm"	Mark Furtner/Tim Grose/Tim Yatras	5:31
5.	"Set in Stone"	Tim Grose/Tim Yatras	5:13
6.	"Someone Else's Dream"	Tim Grose/Tim Yatras/Mark Furtner/Andrew Dowling	5:50
7.	"Forever"	Tim Grose/Tim Yatras/Andrew Dowling	7:59
8.	"Beyond the Light"	Tim Grose/Tim Yatras/Mark Furtner/Andrew Dowling	3:38
9.	"The End of Days"	Tim Grose/Tim Yatras	8:22
10.	"Be My Guest"	Tim Grose/Tim Yatras/Brendan McDonald	7:52
11.	"New Horizons"	Tim Grose/Tim Yatras	6:51
12.	"On a Night Like This (Kylie Minogue cover) (bonus track)"	Steve Torch/Graham Stack/Mark Taylor/Brian Rawling	3:33

== Personnel ==
Musical

Lord

- Lord Tim – vocals, guitars, keyboards, bass guitar
- Tim Yatras – drums, keyboards, backing vocals
- Andrew Dowling – bass guitar, backing vocals
- Mark Furtner – guitar, keyboards, backing vocals

with

- Tania Moran – backing vocals
- Chris Brooks – guitar (on 10)
- Craig Goldy – guitar (on 10)
- Glen Drover – guitar (on 10)
- Pete Lesperance – guitar (on 11)
- Olof Mörck – guitar (on 10)
- Stu Marshall – guitar (on 10)
- Felipe Andreoli – bass guitar (on 10)
- Chris Porcianko – guitar (on 10)
- Justin Sayers – bass guitar (on 10)
- Richie Hausberger – guitar (on 10)
- Yoshiyasu Maruyama – guitar (on 10)

Technical

- Produced and mixed by Lord Tim at SLS Studios, Wollongong

Graphical

- Cover art – Felipe Machado Franco
- Booklet design and layout – Lord Tim
- Photography – Vesna Trokter
