= Empires of Eden =

Australian heavy metal project

- Empires of Eden logo

Background information
- Origin: Sydney, Australia
- Genres: Heavy metal Power metal Melodic metal
- Years active: 2008–present
- Label: Activist Music

Empires of Eden is an Australian collaborative power metal recording project based in Sydney and conceived and overseen by guitarist Stu Marshall, known for his work with Dungeon and Paindivision.

== History ==
=== Origins and proof of concept (2007–2008) ===
Paving the way for Empires of Eden's collaborative ethos, Marshall was heavily involved in the writing of Dungeon's 2004 album One Step Beyond. Inspired by the production of the album, and its reception, Marshall began evaluating the viability of a framework for an international recording project in the tradition of Ayreon or Avantasia.

=== Songs of War and Vengeance (2009) ===
Marshall approached a number of vocalists and other musicians with the premise that they were to be responsible for their own lyrics and melodies within a composition tailored to their typical style and range. The album was recorded at Marshall’s Frontiers Studio in Sydney and featured Louie Gorgievski (Crimsonfire), Mike Zoias (Transcending Mortality) and Chris Ninni (Sydney session vocalist), among others.

While the majority of soloing on the album was penned by Marshall, there are also performances by guests including 'Lord' Tim Grose and Mark Furtner (Lord), Ben Thomas (Paindivision) Richie Hausberger (Project Doomsday), Chris Porcianko Vanishing Point, Yoshiyasu Maruyama (Argument Soul) and Akira Takada (Cerberus).

=== Reborn in Fire (2010) ===
For the second release, Marshall approached singers who had been major influences on his musical style, and the effort featured Zak Stevens, Michael Vescera, Steve Grimmett and Sean Peck as well as returning guest vocalists.

In 2011, the band signed a management deal with Rock N Growl Records.

== Members ==
=== Songs of War and Vengeance (2009) ===
- Stu Marshall – guitar, bass, orchestral arrangement, drum programming, engineering
- Louie Gorgievski – vocals
- Chris Ninni – vocals
- Mike Zoias – vocals
- Dan Quinlan – co-engineering, production
- 'Lord' Tim Grose – guest solo appearance (guitar)
- Mark Furtner – guest solo appearance (guitar)
- Akira Takada – guest solo appearance (guitar)
- Gun Arvidssen – spoken word
- Yoshiyasu Maruyama – guest solo appearance (guitar)
- Richie Hausberger – guest solo appearance (guitar)
- Ben Thomas – guest solo appearance (guitar)
- Chris Porcianko – guest solo appearance (guitar)

=== Reborn in Fire (2010) ===
- Stu Marshall – guitar, bass, orchestral arrangement, drum programming, engineering
- Louie Gorgievski – vocals
- Chris Ninni – vocals
- Mike Zoias – vocals
- Dan Quinlan – co-engineering, production
- Zak Stevens – vocals
- Michael Vescera – vocals
- Steve Grimmett – vocals
- Sean Peck – vocals
- Carlos Zema – vocals
- Jason "Jasix" Manewell – drums
- Bobby Williamson – guest solo appearance (keyboard)

== Discography ==
- Songs of War and Vengeance (2009)
- Reborn in Fire (2010)
- Channelling the Infinite (2012)
- Architect of Hope (2015)
- Guardians of Time (2024)
