= Resurrection (disambiguation) =

Resurrection is the coming back to life after death.

Resurrection or The Resurrection may also refer to:

== Supernatural ==
- Resurrection of Jesus
- Universal resurrection, often referred to by the term of art "resurrection of the dead", the final resurrection at the end time
- Undead
- Day of Resurrection in Islam, the time when the dead arise from their graves to be judged by God

== Arts and entertainment ==
=== Film ===
- Alien Resurrection, a 1997 science-fiction horror film and the fourth installment of the Alien franchise
- Halloween: Resurrection, a 2002 horror sequel of the Halloween franchise
- The Mechanic: Resurrection, a 2016 action film and sequel to the 2011 action film The Mechanic
- Resurrection (1909 film), an American short film by D.W. Griffith
- Résurrection, a 1910 film directed by Henri Desfontaines
- Resurrection (1912 film), a lost silent drama short film directed by Joseph A. Golden
- Resurrezione, a 1917 film by Mario Caserini
- Resurrection (1918 film), an American silent film by Edward Jose
- Resurrection (1923 film), a German silent film by Frederic Zelnik
- Resurrection (1927 film), an American silent film by Edwin Carewe
- Resurrection (1931 English-language film), an American film by Edwin Carewe
- Resurrection (1931 Italian film), a film by Alessandro Blasetti
- Resurrection (1931 Spanish-language film), an American film by Eduardo Arozamena and David Selman
- Resurrection (1943 film), a Mexican film
- Resurrection (1944 film), an Italian film by Flavio Calzavara
- Resurrection (1958 film), a German/Italian/ French film
- Resurrection (1960 film), a Russian film
- Resurrection, a 1968 British film by David Giles
- Resurrection (1980 film), an American drama directed by Daniel Petrie
- Resurrection (1999 film), a thriller directed by Russell Mulcahy
- Resurrection (2001 film), a drama by Paolo and Vittorio Taviani
- Resurrection, a 2010 film by Jeff Burr
- Resurrection (2016 Argentine film), a film written and directed by Gonzalo Calzada
- Resurrection (2016 Mexican film), a documentary by Eugenio Polgovsky
- Resurrection (2021 film), a biblical drama directed by Ciarán Donnelly
- Resurrection (2022 film), a psychological thriller directed by Andrew Semans
- Resurrection (2025 film), a science fiction film directed by Bi Gan
- Risen (2016 film), originally known as Resurrection
- Tupac: Resurrection, a 2003 documentary

=== Games ===
- Mummy: The Resurrection, a role-playing game
- Rise 2: Resurrection, a 1996 PC game

=== Music ===
==== Classical music and operas ====
- Resurrection (opera), by Peter Maxwell Davies
- Symphony No. 2 (Mahler), by Gustav Mahler, known as the Resurrection Symphony

==== Albums ====
- Resurrection (Anastacia album) (2014)
- Resurrection (Chimaira album) (2007)
- Resurrection (Common album) (1994)
- Resurrection (Criminal Nation album) (2000)
- Resurrection (Dungeon album) (1999)
- Resurrection (2005 Dungeon album)
- Resurrection (East 17 album) (1998)
- Resurrection (Galneryus album) (2010)
- The Resurrection (Geto Boys album) (1996)
- Resurrection (Godgory album) (1999)
- Resurrection (Grade 8 album) (2004)
- Resurrection (Halford album) (2000)
- Resurrection (Lords of the Underground album) (1999)
- Resurrection (New Found Glory album) (2014)
- Resurrection (Chris Pérez album) (1999)
- Resurrection (Play Dead album) (1992)
- Resurrection (Possessed album) (2003)
- Resurrection, a 2018 album by Suga Free
- The Resurrection (Theatre of Ice album) (1986)
- Resurrection (Twista album) (1994)
- Resurrection (Venom album) (2000)
- Resurrection (Vice Squad album) (1999)
- Resurrection (Bobby Womack album) (1994)
- Tupac: Resurrection (soundtrack) (2003)
- Resurrection, by Nicol Sponberg
- Resurrection (H.O.T. album) (1998)

==== Songs ====
- "Resurrection", by Andy Kim, 1968
- "Resurrection", by The McCoys, 1968
- "Resurrection", by Vice Squad, 1981
- "Resurrection", by Status Quo on 1+9+8+2, 1982
- "Resurrection", by Terrorizer on World Downfall, 1989
- "Resurrection", by Loud, 1991
- "Resurrection" (Brian May song), 1992
- "Resurrection", by Quiet Riot on Terrified, 1993
- "Resurrection" (Common song), 1994
- "Resurrection" (Moist song), 1996
- "The Resurrection" (Lenny Kravitz song), 1996
- Resurrection (Fear Factory EP), 1998
- "Resurrection (Paper, Paper)", by Bone Thugs-n-Harmony, 2000
- "Resurrection", by HIM on Razorblade Romance, 2000
- "ResuRection", by PPK, 2001
- "Resurrection", by Apocalyptica on Reflections, 2003
- "Resurrection", by Nicol Sponberg, 2004
- "A Resurrection", by Bleeding Through on Bleeding Through, 2010
- "The Resurrection", by The Agonist on Five, 2016

==== Other music ====
- Resurrection (video album), a 2008 live DVD by Flower Travellin' Band
- Resurrection Fest, a Spanish rock music festival

=== Novels ===
- Ressurreição, an 1872 novel by Machado de Assis
- Resurrection (Tolstoy novel), 1899, by Leo Tolstoy
- Resurrection, a 1934 novel by William Gerhardie
- The Resurrection, a 1966 novel by John Gardner
- Resurrection, a novelization of the 1980 film by George Gipe
- Resurrection, a 1992 novel by Katharine Kerr
- The Resurrections, a 1994 novel by Simon Louvish
- Alien Resurrection, a novelization of the fourth Alien film by Ann C. Crispin and Kathleen O'Malley
- Alien Resurrection: The Official Junior Novelization, another novelization by Terry Bisson
- Projekt Saucer V: Resurrection, a 1999 novel by W. A. Harbinson
- Battlestar Galactica: Resurrection, a 2001 novel by Richard Hatch and Stan Timmons
- Resurrection, a 2001 novel by Arwen Elys Dayton
- Resurrection, a 2002 novel by Karen E. Taylor
- Resurrection, a 2004 novel by Robert Asprin and Eric Del Carlo
- The Wereling: Resurrection, a 2004 novel by Stephen Cole
- Resurrection (Forgotten Realms novel), a 2005 fantasy novel by Paul S. Kemp and R. A. Salvatore
- Resurrection, a 2012 novel by Arwen Elys Dayton
- Skulduggery Pleasant: Resurrection, the 10th book in the Skulduggery Pleasant series
- Batman: Resurrection, a 2024 novel by John Jackson Miller featuring the DC Comics character Batman
- Resurrection, a 2024 novel by Danielle Steel

=== Comics ===
- Evil Ernie: Resurrection, a 1993 comic book limited series published by Chaos! Comics
- Silver Surfer/Warlock: Resurrection, a 1994 comic book limited series published by Marvel Comics
- The Darkness: Resurrection, a 2004 collected edition of the second volume of The Darkness comic book series
- Resurrection, an Oni Press comic book series that ran from 2007–2008 and 2009–2010
- Hack/Slash: Resurrection, a 2017–2018 comic book limited series published by Image Comics
- Nova: Resurrection, a 2017 collected edition of the seventh volume Nova comic book series
- Marvel Zombies: Resurrection, a 2019 comic book one-shot and 2020 limited series published by Marvel Comics

=== Other publications ===
- The Resurrection: Twelve Expository Essays on the Fifteenth Chapter of St. Paul's First Epistle to the Corinthians, an 1869 book by Samuel Cox
- The Resurrection, a 1907 book by Edward M. Bounds
- "Resurrection", a 1957 short story by Robert Shea
- Resurrection, a 2000 non-fiction book by Hank Hanegraaff
- Resurrection (magazine), the Journal of the Computer Conservation Society in the UK

=== Television ===
==== Series ====
- Resurrection (South Korean TV series), 2005 South Korean television series
- Resurrection (American TV series), 2014 American television series
- Resurrection, the title of the third season of Scream
- Dexter: Resurrection, 2025 American television series and the third series in the Dexter franchise

==== Episodes ====
- "Resurrection", a 2015 episode of The 100
- "Resurrection", a 2016 episode of 12 Monkeys
- "Resurrection", a 2004 episode of Alias season 3
- "Resurrection", a 1999 episode of Amazon (1999)
- "Resurrection", a 1999 episode of Boy Meets World season 6
- "Resurrection", a 2015 episode of Castle season 7
- "Resurrection" (CSI: Miami), a 2008 episode of CSI: Miami
- "Resurrection", a 1985 episode of Dallas season 9
- "Resurrection" (Daredevil), a 2018 episode of Daredevil
- "Resurrection", a 2006 episode of Desire
- "Resurrection", a 1998 episode of Diagnosis: Murder
- "Resurrection", a 2002 episode of The District
- "Resurrection", a 1997 episode of Earth: Final Conflict
- "Resurrection", a 2008 episode of Eleventh Hour (American)
- "Resurrection", a 1989 episode of Falcon Crest
- "What Was Lost (Part 2): Resurrection", a 2002 episode of Farscape
- "Resurrection" (The Flash), a 2022 episode of The Flash
- "Resurrection" (The Following), a 2014 episode of The Following
- "Resurrection", a 2019 episode of Happy!
- "Resurrection", a 1998 episode of Hercules: The Legendary Journeys
- "Resurrection", a 2023 episode of Kengan Ashura
- "Resurrection", a 2010 episode of Legend of the Seeker
- "Resurrection", a 1998 episode of The Legend of William Tell
- "Resurrection", a 1995 episode of Lois & Clark: The New Adventures of Superman
- "Resurrection", a 2018 episode of Lost in Space (2018)
- "Resurrection", a 2000 episode of The Lost World
- "Resurrection", a 2004 episode of Missing (Canadian)
- "Resurrection", a 2013 episode of The Mob Doctor
- "Resurrection", a 1996 episode of Mortal Kombat: Defenders of the Realm
- "Resurrection", a 1999 episode of Nash Bridges
- "Resurrection", a 2013 episode of NCIS: Los Angeles
- "Resurrection" (The Outer Limits), a 1996 episode of The Outer Limits
- "Resurrection", a 2014 episode of Penny Dreadful
- "Resurrection", a 2005 episode of Power Rangers S.P.D.
- "Resurrection", a 2019 episode of Public Enemy
- "Resurrection", a 2018 episode of ReBoot: The Guardian Code
- "Resurrection", a 2005 episode of ReGenesis
- "Resurrection", a 2012 episode of Revenge season 2
- "Resurrection", episode 3 of RoboCop: Prime Directives, a 2001 miniseries based on the RoboCop film series
- "Resurrection", a 1995 episode of SeaQuest DSV
- "Resurrection" (Secret Invasion), a 2023 episode of Secret Invasion
- "Resurrection", a 2026 episode of Slow Horses
- "Resurrection", a 2004 episode of Smallville season 3
- "Resurrection", a 1985 episode of Spenser: For Hire
- "Resurrection", a 1986 episode of St. Elsewhere
- "Resurrection" (Star Trek: Deep Space Nine), a 1997 episode of Star Trek: Deep Space Nine
- "Resurrection" (Stargate SG-1), a 2004 episode of Stargate SG-1
- "Resurrection", a 2001 episode of Starhunter
- "Resurrection", a 2018 episode of Superstition
- "Resurrection", episode 4 (US) or episode 13 (UK) of Tales from the Neverending Story, a 2001–2002 series based on the Michael Ende novel
- "Resurrection", a 2008 episode of Tim and Eric Awesome Show, Great Job!
- "Resurrection", a 2020 episode of Vikings season 6
- "Resurrection", a 1995 episode of The Watcher (1995)
- "Resurrection" (Wentworth), a 2020 episode of Wentworth
- "Resurrection" (What We Do in the Shadows), a 2020 episode of What We Do in the Shadows
- "The Resurrection", a 2018 episode of Black Lightning season 1
- "The Resurrection" (Entourage), a 2007 episode of Entourage
- "The Resurrection", a 2014 episode of Gold Rush
- "The Resurrection", a 2024 episode of House of Ninjas
- "The Resurrection" (War of the Worlds), a 1988 episode of War of the Worlds
- "The Resurrection", a 2023 episode of Wura season 1

=== Other arts and entertainment ===
- The Resurrection (Piero della Francesca), a 1460s painting by Piero della Francesca
- The Resurrection (Cecco del Caravaggio), a 1619 painting by Cecco del Caravaggio
- The Resurrection (Fazzini) (La Resurrezione), a 1977 sculpture by Pericle Fazzini
- "The Resurrection" ("Il Risorgimento"), an 1828 poem by Giacomo Leopardi also translated "Resurgence"
- The Resurrection (play), a 1927 short play by William Butler Yeats
- Resurrection (Fabergé egg)

== Other uses ==
- Resurrection Health Care, a Catholic health care organization in the Chicago area
- Resurrection Remix OS, Android custom ROM
- Resurrection Bay, a fjord on the Kenai Peninsula of Alaska, US

== See also ==
- Al-Qiyama ("The Resurrection"), the seventy-fifth sura of the Qur'an
- Al-Ba'ath (Arabic for The Resurrection), a Syrian newspaper
- La resurrezione, an oratorio by Georg Frideric Handel
- Risurrezione, a 1904 opera by Franco Alfano
- Resurrección (Verónica Castro album) (2009)
- Resurección (2005), a dance piece created by the alternative tango company CETA
- Resurrected (disambiguation)
- Resurrection Cemetery (disambiguation)
- Resurrection Day (disambiguation)
- Resurrection from the dead (disambiguation)
- Voskresenie, a quasi-Masonic Russian sect, Russian for Resurrection or Sunday
