= Digital Lies =

Studio album by Lord
- Released: February 22, 2013
- Recorded: SLS Studios, Wollongong
- Genre: Power metal
- Length: 61:07
- Producer: Lord Tim

Lord chronology
Return of the Tyrant (2009)	Digital Lies (2013)	Fallen Idols (2019)

Professional ratings
Review scores
Source	Rating
Metal.de	7/10
Rock Hard	9/10

Digital Lies is the fourth full-length album by the Australian heavy metal band Lord. It was released in Australia on February 22, 2013, by the band's own label Dominus. This was the only Lord album with Damian Costas on drums. After replacing Tim Yatras in 2009, he departed in 2014. The Colombian artist Felipe Machado Franco designed the art, as he had done for the previous two Lord albums.

== Critical reception ==
Brendan Crabb from The Music magazine summarized the album: "The greater breadth means grizzled metal fans may not appreciate certain aspects of Digital Lies. Most other heavy music fans, however, are sure to be willing to hear their truth." Glenn Waller also from The Music wrote: "Cohesive and considered, Digital Lies is the clarion call to enter a battle on a unicorn wielding a flaming sword."

== Track listing ==
No.	Title	Length
1.	"Incipio"	0:34
2.	"Betrayal Blind"	5:00
3.	"Digital Lies"	5:51
4.	"Point of View"	6:56
5.	"Walk Away"	5:37
6.	"2D Person in a 3D World"	4:19
7.	"Final Seconds"	5:29
8.	"The Last Encore"	8:34
9.	"Because We Can"	1:58
10.	"The Chalkboard Prophet"	8:13
11.	"Battle of Venarium"	8:36

== Personnel ==
- Lord Tim – vocals, guitars, keyboards
- Damian Costas – drums
- Andrew Dowling – bass guitar, backing vocals
- Mark Furtner - guitar, keyboards, backing vocals
