= Fury (Australian band) =

Australian thrash metal band

- Also known as: The Harrowed
- Origin: Broken Hill, New South Wales, Australia
- Genres: Heavy metal; thrash metal
- Years active: 1993–2011
- Label: Massacre
- Past members: Ricky Boon; Darren McLennan; Tim Hinton; Daniel Wall; Mick O'Neil; Aaron Dewsbery; Ben Harris; Derek Beauchamp; Steve Comacchio; Chad Cosgrove

Fury were a thrash metal band formed in Broken Hill, Australia in 1993 and for a time were based in Adelaide, Australia. Due to talks with their record label, Fury became known as The Harrowed in Europe, although they retained their original moniker of Fury within Australia. The group's former guitarist, Ricky Boon, is blind due to the degenerative eye condition Retinitis Pigmentosa. His cousin is "Lord Tim" Grose frontman and band leader of Lord and previously the now defunct Dungeon. They had released several tracks on American compilation albums for Dwell Records, recording covers for Megadeth, Suicidal Tendencies, Death and King Diamond tribute albums. The band is currently on an indefinite hiatus whilst members Ricky Boon, Mick O'Neil and Tim Hinton focus on a new project.

== History ==
Fury issued a four-track extended play, Stigmatised, in 2000. A reviewer from Metal Fanatix rated it at 71 out of 100 and explained, "they incorporate death metal and hardcore influences, and it makes their music almost like a deathcore band... The songs are good on this four song MCD, but they seem to lack direction. They have some good riffs but they seem to not be carried out to their full potential."

The Metal Fanatix reviewer described their second album, Slavekind, as "Like their previous music it is straight ahead thrash somewhere between the sounds of Pantera and Scatterbrain. At times this disk gets you going like a sixteen piston engine and at others like a banging door in a breeze... these guys are playing what they want, and not being distracted into something they can't relate to."

== Members ==
- Ricky Boon - guitar
- Darren McLennan - guitar
- Tim Hinton - drums
- Daniel Wall - bass
- Mick O'Neil - vocals
- Aaron Dewsbery - bass
- Ben Harris - drums
- Derek Beauchamp - drums
- Steve Comacchio - bass
- Chad Cosgrove - vocals

== Discography ==
=== Albums ===
- Fury (1997)
- Slavekind (2001, re-released in 2003)
- Forbidden Art (2005)
  - The Harrowed (by The Harrowed) (re-release of Forbidden Art via Massacre Records, 2007)
- Forgotten Lore (2010)
- Contagion (2010)
- Transfiguration (2011)

=== Extended plays ===
- Stigmatized (2000)
- Blood, Sweat and Iron (2005)

=== Video albums ===
- DVD Video Promo (DVD, 2011)
