= Fallen Idols (album) =

Studio album by Lord
- Released: August 2019
- Recorded: 2018–2019
- Studio: SLS Studios, Wollongong
- Genre: Heavy metal, power metal, thrash metal, extreme metal
- Length: 67:34
- Label: Dominus
- Producer: Lord Tim

Lord chronology
Digital Lies (2013)	Fallen Idols (2019)

Fallen Idols is the fifth and final full-length album by the Australian heavy metal band Lord. Their first album in six years, it was released in Australia in August 2019, by the band's own label Dominus. Drummer Tim Yatras returns as a session member for this album. The Colombian artist Felipe Machado Franco designed the art, as he had done for the previous two Lord albums.

The album's first single and music video "United (Welcome Back)" was released in February 2019. Fallen Idols hit the Australian Artist Album Charts at #20.

Talking about the influences used for this album, frontman Lord Tim explained, "It’s business as usual really… there’s always been like this big heavy/thrash/extreme metal thing always going through what we’ve been doing for the last 20 years… I think more the production has brought things out more. We put the focus on – we love extreme metal – so we put the focus back on to a lot of the extreme stuff that we love as well as the light stuff as well."

Following the success of this album, bassist Andy Dowling started a 10-part podcast series titled "Nod to the Old School", "all about the old school generation mixtape and metal compilations." Guests who had participated in the podcast include Andy LaRocque (King Diamond), David Ellefson (Megadeth), Johnny Dee (Doro), and Lord Tim, among others.

Lord had recorded a followup to the album, intended for release in 2024, however due to the band's breakup after having become aware of a criminal matter, the album was permanently shelved, its existence only being revealed in a 17 February 2025 statement by Dowling and Furtner.

== Track listing ==
No.	Title	Length
1.	"United (Welcome Back)"	4:58
2.	"Immortal"	6:06
3.	"Fallen Idols"	4:48
4.	"Wilder Than the Wind"	4:56
5.	"Nod to the Old School"	3:50
6.	"Chaos Raining"	6:27
7.	"Counting Down the Hours"	5:57
8.	"In Dreams" (bonus track)	5:26
9.	"The Edge of the World"	4:54
10.	"Kill or Be Killed"	6:13
11.	"Master of Darkness"	6:36
12.	"Break the Ice" (John Farnham cover, bonus track)	3:31
13.	"Touch the Fire" (Icehouse cover, bonus track)	3:52

== Personnel ==
- Lord Tim – vocals, guitars, keyboards
- Tim Yatras – drums
- Andrew Dowling – bass guitar, backing vocals
- Mark Furtner - guitar, keyboards, backing vocals
