= Resurrection (Dungeon album) =

Studio album by Dungeon
- Released: 1999
- Recorded: Powerhouse Studios, Sydney, Australia, 1998
- Genre: Heavy metal, Power metal
- Length: 46:39
- Label: Warhead Records
- Producer: Lord Tim, Mark Worrall & Gustav Hoffman

Dungeon chronology
Demolition (1996)	Resurrection (1999)	A Rise to Power (2002)

Professional ratings
Review scores
Source	Rating
Rock Hard	9.5/10

Resurrection is the second album from Australian heavy metal band – Dungeon. Recording was fraught with difficulties including a brief period when first Sayers, then Grose – both left and then rejoined the group. The low budget available resulted in poor sound quality; nonetheless Dungeon was courted by Century Media before deciding to have the album released by Warhead Records. It was released in October 1999, as the final release from that label. In 2005, the album was completely re-recorded and released worldwide. The 2005 version featured Lord Tim (vocals, guitar, keyboards, bass), Steve Moore (drums, vocals) and Stu Marshall (guitar, vocals).

== 2005 re-recording ==
Resurrection was completely re-recorded during the sessions for the One Step Beyond album and released in 2005. It was released by LMP worldwide and in Australia by Modern Invasion.

The song "Severed Ties" replaces a track called "Let It Go" from the original album which was written by ex-member Justin Sayers and which he was performing live with his band Platinum Brunette. The Australian version contained versions of "Playing to Win" by Little River Band and the Thin Lizzy song "Waiting for an Alibi" with lead vocals by Marshall. A special edition of the album also included a symphonic version of "Severed Ties" with a violin part by Karyn Hamilton.

== Critical reception ==
Powermetal.de reviewed the re-recorded version and criticized the production values and said the band is unoriginal and unexceptional as musicians. Vampster also reviewed the re-recording and gave a positive review, saying that although the album isn't anything special, it beats most of the competition.

== Track listing ==
No.	Title	Writer(s)	Length
1.	"Death from Above"	Tim Grose	0:44
2.	"Resurrectiom"	Tim Grose/Steve Moore	4:39
3.	"Paradise"	Dale Corney/Tim Grose	4:37
4.	"Judgment Day"	Tim Grose	5:01
5.	"Wake Up"	Justin Sayers	4:31
6.	"Fight"	Dale Corney/Tim Grose/Justin Sayers	3:57
7.	"Let it Go"	Justin Sayers	3:16
8.	"Time to Die"	Dale Corney	5:43
9.	"I Am Death"	Tim Grose	5:41
10.	"No Way Out"	Dale Corney	3:19
11.	"The Legend of Huma"	Tim Grose	7:01

=== 2005 re-recording ===
Standard version

No.	Title	Writer(s)	Length
1.	"Death from Above"	Tim Grose	0:53
2.	"Resurrection"	Tim Grose/Steve Moore	4:40
3.	"Paradise"	Dale Corney/Tim Grose	4:35
4.	"No Way Out"	Dale Corney	3:21
5.	"Wake Up"	Justin Sayers	4:36
6.	"Fight"	Dale Corney/Tim Grose/Justin Sayers	3:55
7.	"Severed Ties"	Tim Grose	5:09
8.	"Time to Die"	Dale Corney	5:28
9.	"I Am Death"	Tim Grose	5:28
10.	"Judgment Day"	Tim Grose	4:45
11.	"The Legend of Huma"	Tim Grose	7:01

Australian version

No.	Title	Writer(s)	Length
12.	"Playing to Win"	Graham Goble/John Farnham/Spencer Proffer)	3:11
13.	"Waiting for an Alibi"	Phil Lynott	3:19

EU/USA limited edition

No.	Title	Writer(s)	Length
12.	"Playing to Win"	Graham Goble/John Farnham/Spencer Proffer)	3:11
13.	"Waiting for an Alibi"	Phil Lynott	3:19
14.	"Severed Ties (Acoustic/Orchestral Mix)"	?	?

Available in a digipack with a bonus live CD from Dungeon's 2003 Japanese tour and a MPG of I Am Death.

== Songs ==
- The song "The Legend of Huma" is based on the novel The Legend of Huma from the Dragonlance series of books
- Three tracks had appeared in different versions on the previous Japan-only release Demolition. These songs were "Paradise", "Time to Die" and "I Am Death". "Paradise" is Dungeon's most recorded track as an even earlier version with a different bass line featured on the "Changing Moods" demo. It was then recorded again for Rising Power in 2003 and a fifth time in 2004. There is also a live version of the track on Under the Rising Sun.
- bass player Justin Sayers sings the lead vocal on the tracks "Wake Up" and "Let It Go". "Let It Go" does not appear on the re-recorded version of the album. It was replaced by a track called "Severed Ties". Sayers performs a version of "Wake Up" with his current band Platinum Brunette that features significantly different lyrics.

== Personnel ==
- Lord Tim – vocals, guitar, keyboards
- Steve Moore – drums, vocals
- Dale Corney – guitar, vocals
- Justin Sayers – bass, vocals, lead vocals tracks 5 and 7
- Gustav Hoffman – keyboards (guest)

Re-recording

- Lord Tim - vocals, guitar, keyboards, bass
- Steve Moore - drums, vocals
- Stu Marshall - guitar, lead vocals on "Waiting for an Alibi"
