= One Step Beyond (Dungeon album) =

Studio album by Dungeon
- Released: November 2004
- Recorded: R&R Studios and SLS Studios, Sydney, Australia, 2004
- Genre: Heavy metal, Power metal
- Length: 48:11
- Label: Metal Warriors; LMP
- Producer: Lord Tim

Dungeon chronology
A Rise to Power (2002)	One Step Beyond (2004)	Resurrection (2005)

Professional ratings
Review scores
Source	Rating
Metal.de	7/10
Rock Hard	8.5/10

One Step Beyond is the fourth album from Australian heavy metal band Dungeon. It was released in Australia in November 2004 by Metal Warriors and in Japan at the same time by Sound Holic. LMP released the album worldwide in February 2005. Unlike the albums that preceded and followed it, One Step Beyond featured the same artwork and track-listing in all markets where it was released (although the United States version has a different running order). The Australian version was to contain covers of "Til the Living End" by Dokken and Queen's "The Hero" but Dungeon's German label LMP refused to allow them to issue an alternate edition and the tracks were later made available as downloads. LMP later issued a special edition for the US market that also included the band's self-produced 2004 live DVD.

Drummer Steve Moore left Dungeon before the album was released. The band photos in the CD booklet feature Lord Tim and Stu Marshall with new drummer Grahame Goode and former bass player Justin Sayers, who had left the group in 1999.

== Critical reception ==
Powermetal.de preferred the heavier sound of their previous record, A Rise to Power. "Against the Wind" was highlighted for its catchiness. The album was said to fall short compared to other releases at the time.

== Track listing ==
No.	Title	Writer(s)	Length
1.	"The Power Within"	Stu Marshall/Tim Grose	5:12
2.	"Against the Wind"	Tim Grose	4:28
3.	"The Art of War"	Stu Marshall/Tim Grose	5:45
4.	"The Hunger"	Tim Grose/Stu Marshall	5:51
5.	"Surface Tension"	Tim Grose	5:38
6.	"Terrano del Mar"	Stu Marshall/Tim Grose	8:18
7.	"One Step Beyond"	Tim Grose	4:09
8.	"Under the Cross"	Stu Marshall/Tim Grose	7:47
9.	"Epilogue"	Peter Dodds McCormick/arr. Tim Grose	1:05

== Recording notes ==
- Several of the tracks on this album deal with self-empowerment and personal struggle against adversity.
- The track "Epilogue" is a heavily-distorted instrumental version of the Australian national anthem Advance Australia Fair.
- "Under the Cross" is about the battle of the Eureka Stockade, a gold miner's uprising on the Victorian goldfields in 1854.
- "The Art of War" was inspired by Sun Tzu's ancient treatise on the military and warfare, The Art of War.
- "Tarranno del Mar" is about a demonic pirate. The title translates as "Terror of the Seas". Lord Tim's post-Dungeon band Lord recorded a sequel in 2010 that was released as the title track of the EP "Return of the Tyrant".

== Personnel ==
- Lord Tim - vocals, guitar, keyboards, bass
- Stu Marshall - guitar, vocals
- Steve Moore - drums, vocals
