= A Rise to Power =

2002 studio album by Dungeon

- Australian version cover art

Studio album by Dungeon
- Released: 1 August 2002
- Recorded: R&R Studios and SLS Studios, Sydney, Australia, 2001
- Genre: Heavy metal, Thrash metal, Power metal
- Language: English
- Label: Metal Warriors
- Producer: Lord Tim

Dungeon chronology
Resurrection (1999)	A Rise to Power (2002)	One Step Beyond (2004)

International version cover art

Professional ratings
Review scores
Source	Rating
Rock Hard	8/10

A Rise to Power is the third album from Australian heavy metal band Dungeon. It was released in Australia on 1 August 2002 by Metal Warriors and internationally by LMP in 2003, first in Europe on 30 June and then in the U.S. in July. It was the band's first album released in Europe. Both versions feature different cover art; the Australian version was designed by drummer Steve Moore. Lord Tim has stated privately that he dislikes the cover of the European version of the album. On 2 September 2007, it was announced that this album would be re-released (with the original Australian artwork) by Modern Invasion Music with a video clip for the song "Stormchaser" included as a bonus addition.

Dale Corney left Dungeon during the early recording phase but his solos in the songs he had co-written, "Insanity's Fall" and "Where Madness Hides", were used on the album.

== Critical reception ==
Powermetal.de didn't like the Queensrÿche cover but thought that most of the original songs are very good. "Traumatized" was noted as the highlight of the album. Vampster said the songs and guitar solos are too long but called it a solid album overall.

== Track listing ==
*denotes Australian only release

No.	Title	Writer(s)	Length
1.	"The Prophecy"	Tim Grose	2:22
2.	"A Rise to Power"	Tim Grose/Steve Moore	7:04
3.	"Netherlife (Black Roses Die)"	Tim Grose/Steve Moore	6:51
4.	"Insanity's Fall"	Tim Grose/Dale Corney/Steve Moore	4:53
5.	"The Other Side"	Tim Grose/Steve Moore/Brendan McDonald	5:41
6.	"Stormchaser"	Tim Grose/Steve Moore	3:22
7.	"Where Madness Hides"	Tim Grose/Dale Corney/Steve Moore	4:30
8.	"Lost in the Light"	Tim Grose/Brendan McDonald/Steve Moore	7:36
9.	"Life is Black"	Tim Grose/Steve Moore	3:45
10.	"The Birth: The Trauma Begins"	Steve Moore	0:23
11.	"Traumatized"	Steve Moore/Tim Grose	4:22
12.	"A Rise to Power (reprise)"	Tim Grose	1:59
13.	"Wasted Years*" (Iron Maiden cover)	Adrian Smith
14.	"Queen of the Reich" (Queensrÿche cover)	Chris DeGarmo

== Songs ==
- "Netherlife" is about Lord Soth from the Dragonlance series
- "Traumatised" was Moore's main contribution to the album, reworked from ideas he had originally created when he was a member of Addictive. The song caused some controversy among fans as Grose uses a harsh, shrieking vocal style for the verses against his usual mid-range clean vocals in the chorus.
- Video clips for "Stormchaser" and "The Other Side" were made. The clip for "The Other Side" was included on the Japanese promotional album Rising Power and "Stormchaser" was included as a bonus on the 2007 Modern Invasion re-release.
- The high note in the first section of "Lost in the Light" put so much strain on Grose's voice that after he recorded it he was unable to sing for the rest of the day.

== Credits ==
- Lord Tim – vocals, guitar, keyboards,
- Steve Moore – drums, vocals
- Stu Marshall – guitar, vocals
- Brendan "Dakk" McDonald – bass, vocals
- Dale Corney – guitar on tracks 4 and 7
- Kylie Groom – flute
- Angel-Lee Smit – voices on track 1
- Allison Amos – character voice on track 10
