= Charles Billich =

Croatian Australian painter

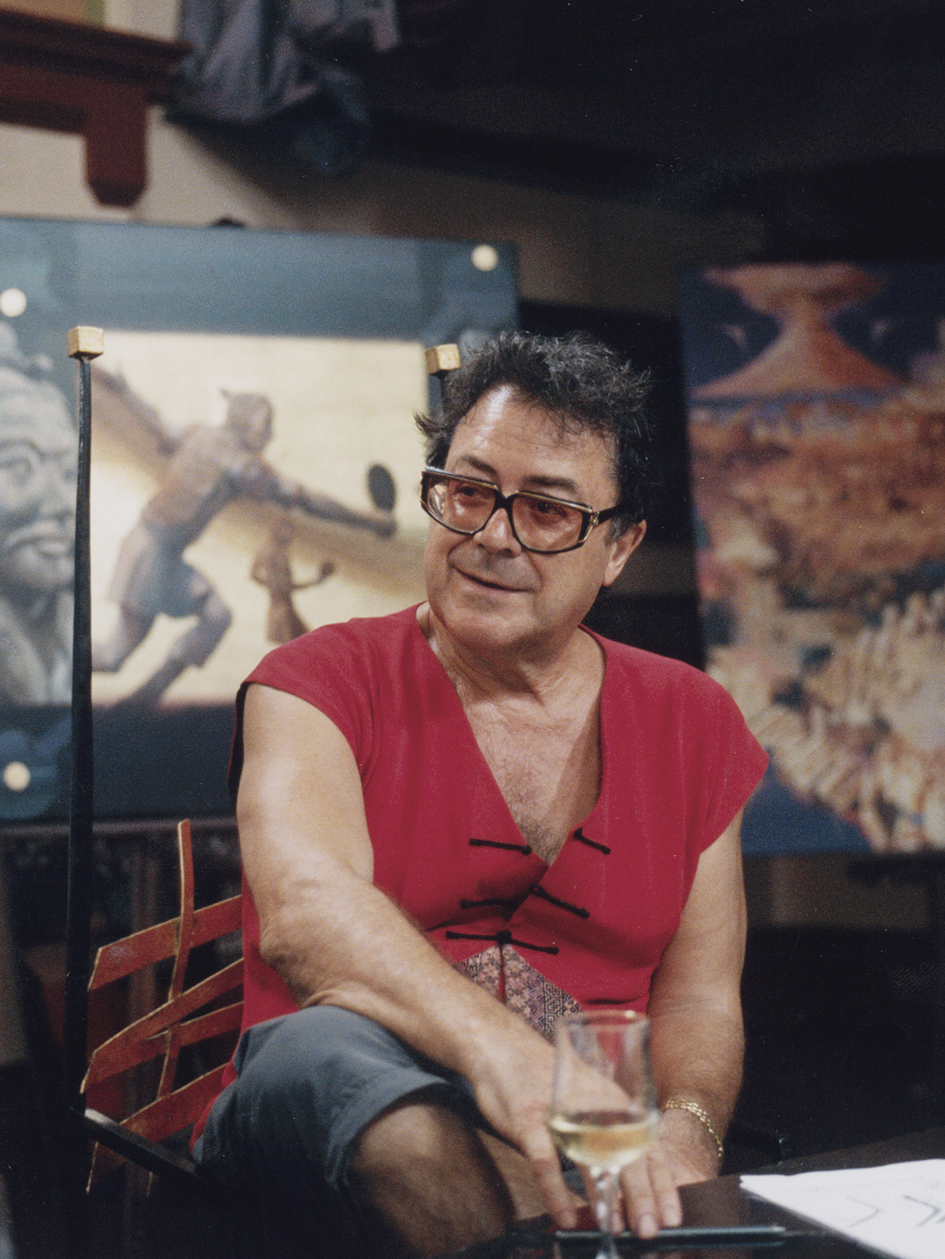
- Billich in 2008
- Born: Carlo Billich; 6 September 1934 (age 92); Lovran, Croatia
- Known for: Painting, sculpting

Charles Billich (born Carlo Billich; 6 September 1934) is a Croatian-Australian artist living in Sydney, Australia.

Charles Billich conceived a series of images based on the Bing Ma Yong Terracotta warriors. The Bing Ma Yong images are represented on a collection of 16 postage stamps currently in circulation in China.

== Billich on Film ==
In 2019, a documentary on his life was released called Billich: Beyond the Canvas, which was directed by Steve Ravic, who is now also at work on a feature film on Billich's life titled "My Way."
