= Resurrected =

Resurrected or The Resurrected may refer to:

== Film and television ==
- The Resurrected, a 1991 American horror film
- Resurrected (film), a 1989 British drama film
- The Resurrected (TV series), a 2025 Taiwanese crime thriller series

== Music ==
- Resurrected (album), by Witchfinder General, 2008
- Resurrected, a 2003 album by Tony Rich
- Destroyer: Resurrected, a 2012 album by Kiss, a remix of the 1976 album Destroyer

== See also ==
- Resurrection (disambiguation)
