= Dead Elysium =

Studio album by Vanishing Point
- Released: 28 August 2020
- Genres: Progressive metal, power metal
- Length: 59:35
- Label: AFM

Vanishing Point chronology
Distant Is the Sun (2014)	Dead Elysium (2020)

Dead Elysium is the sixth album by the Australian progressive metal band Vanishing Point.

== Reception ==
Powermetal.de scored the album 10 out of 10, just as its predecessor: "'Dead Elysium' is just as varied, bombastic, catchy, and riff-driven as 'Distant Is The Sun' was", and "the Australians have actually surpassed" their record from six years prior. They were "still the best melodic metal band in the world", as their music could not "be played any better".

Metal Express Radio also found the record excellent in every respect, rating it a perfect 10. Likewise, Australia's The Music gave it a 4 out of 4 score, among others quipping that the band had hooks "so large they could catch Moby Dick". Rock Hard followed not far behind with a 9 out of 10 score.

Metal.de was positive towards the record. Rating it as a 7 out of 10, Dead Elysium was "a small gem in the melodic metal world", with "fun", "instantly catchy and highly singable" parts. More on the mediocre side, Heavymetal.dk gave a 6/10 score. Some of the songs were too long and lacked variation, and the orchestration was "bombastic": "Actually, all that is missing is a handful of glimmer and a wind machine, and they could very well represent Australia in the upcoming Eurovision Song Contest".

== Track listing ==
1. "Dead Elysium" – 7:01
2. "Count Your Days" – 6:15
3. "To the Wolves" – 5:56
4. "Salvus" – 5:16
5. "The Fall" – 5:20
6. "Free" – 7:12
7. "Recreate the Impossible" – 5:57
8. "Shadow World" – 4:36
9. "The Healing" – 6:02
10. "The Ocean" – 6:00
