= Misery (band) =

Australian death metal band

- Damon Robinson of Misery

Background information
- Origin: Brisbane, Queensland, Australia
- Genre: Death metal
- Years active: 1991–2005, 2009, 2017
- Labels: Velvet Urge, Warhead Records, Venomous Records, Obsidian Records
- Past members: Damon Robinson; Ant Dwyer; Scott Edgar; Glen Philips; Lazslo Kananghinis; Moises Contreras; Darren Goulding
- Website: myspace.com/ondemonwings

Misery was an Australian death metal band from Brisbane, Queensland. Since forming in 1991, the band has released four albums and an EP, and are one of the earliest bands in their genre from their country. The band split in 2005, but has reformed four times for an East Coast Australian tour in support of final album in 2009, to support Taake on an Australian tour in 2017, for the 30th Anniversary of their debut album and play The New Dead Festival in Adelaide 15th April 2023.

== Background ==
The group was formed in 1991 by bassist Damon Robinson and guitarist Scott Edgar, who had been members of earlier Brisbane groups Guardian, Northwinds, Savage, A.I.M. and Black Magic. The band's first line-up featured Robinson, Edgar, drummer Anthony Dwyer, Northwinds guitarist Brad Allen, and vocalist Darren Goulding. Allen was replaced with Laszlo Khaninghinis, and the band recorded two demos in 1992, Sorting of the Insects and Astern Diabolus, before releasing their first album, A Necessary Evil, in 1993.

Soon after the album's release, Misery's reputation as a heavy act was established, and the band undertook its first national tour in support of Pungent Stench. Goulding was fired from the group not long after the tour, replaced with former Mausoleum vocalist Moises Contreras. Goulding would later front Sydney band Sulkus, Wagga Wagga death metal group Manticore, and Sydney nu-metal outfit Art Imitates Crime. In 1994, the band released the Insidious EP with Contreras on vocals. Its accompanying video clip, Torn, was banned from television. The EP was recorded at Red Zeds studios between March and April of that year. Support slots with Deicide and Morbid Angel, and an appearance at the Big Day Out festival, followed. Contreras' stay with the band was short-lived, and after his departure, Robinson took up vocals. Contreras would form melodic death metallers Sakkuth.

In 1997, Misery signed to Sydney metal label Warhead Records and released their second album, Revel in Blasphemy, regarded by many as Misery's heaviest work. More touring followed, with the band playing Metal for the Brain. Another album was set for release by 1998, but due to Warhead Records ceasing operation at the time, third album Curses would not be released until 2000 through Venomous Records.

Throughout the 2000s, the members of Misery busied themselves with other projects. Edgar played in a group called Soundsurgery, while Kananghinis formed punk rock group Greensteam, and Robinson recorded a demo with doom metallers Cardinal Sin. All members of Misery began a Motörhead cover group called White Line Fever, which they would play sets of at their own shows. After a tour of New Zealand in 2001, Kananghinis left Misery to focus on Greensteam full-time. The band continued as a three-piece until 2005, when Robinson left Australia to live in the United States. Misery's fourth and final album, On Demon Wings, was released through Brisbane label Obsidian Records in 2007. In 2005, Edgar formed The Dead, but left in 2008 after one album, and later formed a new band with Dwyer called Laceration Mantra. Misery regrouped in March 2009 for an East Coast tour in support of On Demon Wings with Adelaide doom metal group Mournful Congregation.

In 2017, Misery reformed for a "one off" Brisbane reunion show in support of Norwegian black metal band Taake.

For the 30th anniversary of A Necessary Evil, Misery announced numerous Australian shows, including a slot in the Canberra Metal Fest, a Brisbane Show and a show at Southport. The band announced that they would perform A Necessary Evil in full at the Brisbane concert for the first and last time.

== Line-up ==
- Damon Robinson – bass and vocals
- Scott Edgar – guitar
- Glen Phillips – guitar
- Ant Dwyer – drums

== Former members ==
- Brad Allen – guitar (1991)
- Laszlo Kananghinis – guitar (1991–2001)
- Darren Goulding – vocals (1991–1993)
- Moises Contreras – vocals (1994)

== Discography ==
- A Necessary Evil (1993) Velvet Urge
- Insidious (1994) Valve
- Revel in Blasphemy (1997) Warhead
- Curses (2000) Venomous
- On Demon Wings (2007) Obsidian
