= Stu Marshall =

Australian heavy metal musician

- Birth name: Stuart Marshall
- Born: 29 January 1973 (age 52)
- Origin: Sydney, Australia
- Genres: Heavy metal, hard rock, thrash metal
- Occupations: Musician, songwriter
- Instruments: Guitar, voice
- Years active: 1987–present
- Website: stumarshall.com

Stu Marshall is a guitarist, songwriter and producer from Sydney, Australia. He is a member of Sydney heavy metal band Empires of Eden and Paindivision.

Marshall is best known as a member of the Sydney metal band Dungeon with whom he recorded three albums and toured extensively throughout Australia, Europe and Japan between 2001 and 2005. After playing in cover and tribute bands, Marshall joined Dungeon as the replacement for Dale Corney in late 2001 and made his debut with the band at the annual Metal for the Brain festival. While most of the group's album A Rise to Power had been recorded by the time he joined, several tracks feature Marshall's solos. He also played on the studio albums One Step Beyond and Resurrection and on the live DVD Under the Rising Sun that was made during the band's 2003 tour of Japan.

In late 2005 Marshall founded Paindivision, originally with Dungeon's Tim Yatras on drums but before this band's first live performance the name was changed to 20 Grams. Shortly afterwards, Dungeon disbanded. Marshall finalised the 20 Grams line-up by mid-2006. The group supported Black Label Society in Sydney a short time later. Following this, 20 Grams reverted to the name Pain Division and a four-track EP was recorded and released late in the year. At the beginning of 2007, Pain Division announced a deal with Wollongong label Riot! A self-titled album was released in October 2007. Dan Quinlan joined the band on bass guitar, who toured with the band in Japan on the November tour. In November 2007 he released a solo album called Altered States. A second Paindivision album was released in 2008 with a third due to be recorded during 2010; however this band now appears to have been on extended hiatus as Marshall concentrates on Death Dealer, a USA based power metal band featuring Ross the Boss.

Death Dealer has gone on to tour globally in Moscow, most of Europe and the USA releasing 4 albums.

== Empires of Eden ==
Marshall has also formed a project album of melodic metal under the name Empires of Eden with assistance from members of Transcending Mortality and Crimsonfire, and featuring guest appearances by members of Dungeon, Vanishing Point, Cerberus and Argument Soul. Songs of War and Vengeance was released in Japan July 2009 through Rubicon Records.

Empires of Eden Release Reborn in fire. Securing three separate record deals for a global release, the album was released in July 2010 to global critical acclaim. The album features some of the world's best known heavy metal singers, including Zak Stevens, Mike Vescera and Steve Grimmett.

With Gun Arvidssen, he was the founder of Guitarhead.net webzine (now offline) and is a contributing writer to Guitarist Australia magazine.

In 2011 the band signed a management deal with Rock N Growl Records.

Since then he has released Channelling the infinite, Architect of Hope and in 2024 will release a new album through Massacre Records.

== Discography ==
=== Solo ===
- Altered States (2007)

=== Paindivision ===
- One Path (2008)
- Pain Division (2007)
- "4 Play" (2006)

=== Empires of Eden ===
- Guardians of Time (2024)
- Architect of Hope (2016)
- Channelling The Infinite (2012)
- Reborn in Fire (2010)
- Songs of War and Vengeance (2009)

=== Dungeon ===
- Resurrection (2005)
- One Step Beyond (2004)
- Under the Rising Sun (live DVD/CD) (2004)
- Rising Power (2003)
- A Rise to Power (2002)

=== Lord ===
- A Personal Journey (2003)

=== Cerberus ===
- Fear No Decay

=== Death Dealer ===
- Fuel injected suicide machine (2020)
- Conquered Lands (2018)
- Hallowed Ground (2015)
- War Master (2013)

=== Blasted To Static ===
- Blasted To Static (2015)
