= Ilium (band) =

Australian heavy metal band

- Also known as: Iliad
- Origin: Newcastle, New South Wales, Australia
- Genres: Heavy metal, power metal
- Years active: 1998–present
- Labels: Steelheart, Adrenaline, Escape, Nightmare
- Members: Jason Hodges; Adam Smith; Lord Tim – Guest; Tim Yatras – Guest
- Past members: Lance King; Mike DiMeo; Pete Gilchrist; Corey Gilchrist; Michael Noonan; Mark Snedden; Steve Moore; David Walmsley; Matthew Woodland; Kris Arendse; David Pearson; Glenn Rimer; Kaspar Dahlqvist
- Website: iliumaustralia.bandcamp.com

Ilium is an Australian melodic power metal band formed in Newcastle in 1998 as Iliad. Founding mainstay is guitarist-songwriter, Jason Hodges. Upon Adam Smith (ex-Oracle) joining on guitar they changed their name and have released eight studio albums; Sirens of the Styx (18 December 2003), Permian Dusk (25 November 2005), Vespertilion (17 April 2007), Ageless Decay (22 June 2009), Genetic Memory (26 August 2011), My Misanthropia (14 March 2015), Sirens of the Styx: Re-Styxed (25 October 2017) and Carcinogeist (28 February 2020).

== History ==
=== Founding and early years: 1998–2002 ===
Ilium were founded in Newcastle by former members of local power metal band, Oracle, with guitarist-songwriter Jason Hodges and vocalist Mark Snedden initially as Iliad in 1998. Hodges and Snedden were school friends and had formed Oracle in 1990. Iliad also included later Oracle members: Kris Arendse on guitar and Michael Noonan on bass guitar; as well as session musician, David Pearson on drums. They recorded a six-track demo which the band's website described as "ill-fated from the start, with an inappropriate producer and the band's lack of studio experience, coupled with plaguing health problems, the results were truly horrible". Hodges listed the group's inspirations as "Black Sabbath, Judas Priest, Iron Maiden, Helloween, Rage, Blind Guardian, Gamma Ray, Rush, Megadeth, Coroner, Scorpions, Rainbow, Ozzy Osbourne, [and] Dio".

Late in 1998 with the introduction of Adam Smith, also ex-Oracle, on guitar the group changed its name to Ilium. In 2002 they recorded a four-track eponymous extended play with Dungeon's vocalist and guitarist Lord Tim (aka Tim Grose) producing and adding backing vocals. Noonan left during recording sessions and Smith completed the bass guitar work. The EP included a cover version of Fleetwood Mac's "The Green Manalishi (With the Two Prong Crown)" in the vogue of Judas Priest's 1979 version. The other tracks were "Half-Life", "Semblance" and "Antigone" – the first two were solely written by Hodges, while the latter was co-written with Smith and Sneddon. Yet another ex-Oracle, Matthew Woodland, joined Ilium shortly before its release. The EP gained the attention of several labels, including Sentinel Steel boss Denis Gulbey, with Italian record company Adrenaline's metal label Steelheart signing the band.

=== Sirens of the Styx: 2003–2004 ===
On 18 December 2003 Ilium issued their debut album, Sirens of the Styx, with Lord Tim producing again and Steve Moore providing drums. It included three tracks from Ilium, as well as "Incipience: Beowulf Defeats Grendel", which is part one of a trilogy centred on the Beowulf and Grendel legends. Parts two and three appeared on their third release. "Incipience" was written by Hodges, Smith, Snedden and Noonan. Another track, "The Celestial Sphere", written by Hodges, Smith and Snedden, became Ilium's first music video. Daniel Böhm from German metal magazine, Rock Hard, found the album "sounds wonderfully wrong-headed". After recording the album, Peter Gilchrist joined on bass guitar, while drummer David Walmsley joined shortly thereafter.

Snedden left in July due to family and financial restraints, Lord Tim was recruited in his place, originally to complete the recording sessions but soon became a full-time member. Gilchrist and Walmsley both left Ilium at the end of 2003, Gilchrist was recorded on the demo tracks but bass guitar on the album was provided by Smith, with Walmsley completing his drum duties on the album before exiting. Tim's vocal style which was in tune with Smith and Hodges' vision, which helped Ilium garner international praise, whilst the production duties were taken over largely by Hodges and Smith. Late in 2004, Gilchrist and Walmsley rejoined Ilium, and Gilchrist's 15-year-old son Corey joined on keyboards, with his vocals providing extra body to their live performances. Corey Gilchrist auditioned to appear on the TV talent show, Australian Idol, and twice reached the top 100 but did not progress.

=== Permian Dusk: 2005–2006 ===
Ilium's second album, Permian Dusk, was released on 25 November 2005. Walmsley left again as the album was being mastered and was replaced on drums by Dungeon's Tim Yatras. In October Corey was hit by a train and his foot was amputated, which forced both he and his father out of the band. Corey recovered and later appeared on Australian Idol getting into the semi-finals.

Permian Dusk received a positive review from Rock Hard, which gave it a score of 9.5/10 and led their reviewer, Wolfram Küper, to declare it as the best power metal album of the year. AllMusic's Stewart Mason felt it avoided the "more annoying aspects of modern metal", where Tim's vocals showed "oddly perfect diction and haughty delivery of an old-school metal singer" and the rest of the band "plays it fast and melodic, with clean-sounding chorused guitars riffing". The group provided a music video for "Chloroform Divinity", which was co-written by Hodges and Smith. In November 2006, it was announced that Swedish keyboardist Kaspar Dahlqvist, a former member of various bands including Dionysus, Stormwind, Treasureland and Circle II Circle, had joined the Ilium line-up, though personal issues have meant that he was unable to continue with the band.

=== Vespertilion: 2007–2008 ===
Ilium issued their third album, Vespertilion, on 17 April 2007, which received positive reviews. It included the next two instalments of their Beowulf trilogy with part two, "Desinence: Beowulf and the Serpent", and part three, "Beowulf: The Peroration", both co-written by Hodges, Smith and Snedden.

Rock Hard's Küper rated it at 8.0/10, he found it provided "a partly majestic, partly mystic atmosphere" with the sound of "melody, hardness and independence". Paul Batteiger of The Metal Crypt website noted they "tend to write really long songs that are just a little bit proggy without straying out of pure metal territory – they don't overuse keys, they don't go nuts with the solos, they just write long songs filled with heavy riffs".

Despite many reviews crediting Dahlqvist as keyboardist, it was Smith who played keyboards along with guitar and bass guitar. In November that year Lord Tim announced his departure from Ilium.

=== Ageless Decay: 2009–2010 ===
The release of Ageless Decay in June 2009 brought outstanding reviews from the metal music scene in Europe. The album features vocals by New Yorks Mike DiMeo which takes this band's music to places they have never been before. Surprisingly the band is largely unknown in its home country of Australia.

Significant changes for the album Ageless Decay are the artwork by Dimitar Nikolov and the mixing and mastering by Tommy Hansen. The team of Hodges and Smith continue to gain attention to their songwriting abilities. Ageless Decay is distributed by Escape Music.

=== Genetic Memory: 2011–2014 ===
In July 2010 the band announced that they were working on their fifth album Genetic Memory, The album was released in August 2011 by Escape Music. Many claiming this album a step forward for Ilium in most areas.

2012 a new song named Greenpeace Music Video dedicated to Greenpeace produced by FanVision & Vida Production in cooperation with Ilium, and in acting, written and directed by Diego Vida. Composed by Ilium with Lyrics by Jason Hodges and music by Adam Smith and voice by Mike DiMeo, promoting the new Rainbow Warrior ship.

=== My Misanthropia: 2015-2016 ===
Their sixth full-length release draws from a wide range of US, British and Euro traditional heavy and power metal styles, with dark lyrical themes from various mythologies, legends and the depths of depression.

"My Misanthropia" features a new front man in vocalist Lance King (formerly of Balance of Power, Pyramaze, and Avian), who takes over for the departing Mike DiMeo (ex-Riot).

The album was released digitally on 24 March 2015. The first 1,000 CD copies released were a "Limited Edition Double Digipak" including bonus CD "Wendigo" (5 Tracks) including three originals and two very special remakes; "Tragedy" – (The Bee Gees) and "Love is All" – (Roger Glover/Ronnie James Dio).

On 9 November 2015 Ilium released a lyric video for the song "The Cryptozoologist" through Nightmare's Megaloud YouTube channel.

=== Sirens of the Styx: Re-Styxed: 2017–present ===
Released 25 October 2017. Adam Smith (guitar, bass, keyboard), Lord Tim (vocals), Tim Yatras (drums) and Jason Hodges (lyrics). It is a complete re-working of the 2003 debut, with the original also included in the physical CD package. All songs have been re-written and re-recorded, along with a brand new track – 'Ode of the Trans-Dimensional Puppeteer'. Lord Tim from LORD and Dungeon, who recorded and sang backing vocals on the original, handles lead vocals.

=== Current ===
Adam Smith and Jason Hodges worked on a new EP, Quantum Evolution Event, which was released in 2022.

== Discography ==
Ilium

- Released: 2002
- Format: CD
- Producer: Lord Tim

Sirens of the Styx

- Released: 2003
- Format: CD
- Label: Steelheart (Italy)
- Producer: Lord Tim

Permian Dusk

- Released: 2005
- Format: CD
- Label: Steelheart (Italy)
- Producer: Adam Smith / Jason Hodges

Vespertilion

- Released: 2007
- Format: CD
- Label: Just Say Rock (Australia)
- Producer: Adam Smith / Jason Hodges

Ageless Decay

- Released: 2009
- Format: CD
- Producer: Adam Smith / Jason Hodges

Genetic Memory

- Released: 2011
- Format: CD
- Producer: Adam Smith / Jason Hodges

My Misanthropia

- Released: 2015
- Format: CD
- Label: Nightmare Records
- Producer: Adam Smith / Lance King
- Singles: The Cryptozoologist, The Hatchling

Wendigo EP

- Released: 2015
- Format: CD
- Label: Nightmare Records
- Producer: Adam Smith / Lance King
- Singles: Tragedy, Love is All

Sirens of the Styx: Re-Styxed

- Released: 2017
- Format: Double CD
- Label: Nightmare Records
- Producer: Adam Smith / Lord Tim
- Singles: Ode of the Trans-Dimensional Puppeteer

Carcinogeist

- Released: 2020
- Format: digital/CD
- Producer: Lord Tim
