= Warhead Records =

- Founded: 1992
- Founder: Brad Sims
- Defunct: 2001
- Genre: Heavy metal, Thrash metal, Death metal, Black metal
- Country of origin: Australia
- Location: Parramatta, Sydney, Australia

Warhead Records was an independent record label based in Sydney, Australia that specialised in releasing albums by Australian heavy metal bands. It was formed in 1992 by British migrant Brad Sims and Julie Martin (now Sims) who began by selling demo tapes of local bands at heavy metal shows at Sydney's Lewisham Hotel. In February 1993 Warhead Records released its first recording, the EP Atavism by Sydney doom/death band Cruciform, a group Sims was also managing. This was followed six months later by Neophobia's Fear of the Future. By the beginning of 1996 the label had an extensive roster of Australian bands from across the heavy metal spectrum. Most of its signings were from Sydney, although they included several non-Sydney acts on their label such as Psychrist from Canberra, Manticore from Wagga Wagga, Misery from Brisbane and Epitaph from Perth. Along with its CD releases, Warhead also acted as a demo distribution service for a number of acts. In 1995 several of these were collected for the compilation album Warhead Records Vol. 1.

Warhead was run in tandem with the Hammerhouse, a CD store in the Sydney suburb of Parramatta which sold underground heavy metal music and other merchandise from around the world. In Your Face magazine also came out in 1993 and lasted for 9 issues, it was resurrected again in 1998 and another four issues were released.

In mid-1999, with several albums still awaiting release, Warhead Records ceased trading. The remaining artists were forced to seek their own avenue of release. The label officially wound up in 2001. The block which had contained the Hammerhouse was demolished in 2005.

== Releases ==
Title	Artist	Format	Year of release
"Atavism"	Cruciform	EP	1993
Fear of the Future	Neophobia	Studio album	1993
Opus One	Tscabeze	Studio album	1994
"The Abysmal Fiend"	Psychrist	EP	1994
Bonsai	Frozen Doberman	Studio album	1994
"Mind Control"	Epitaph	EP	1995
"Paradox"	Cruciform	Single (Cassette)	1995
"Spawnography"	Blathudah	EP	1995
Rise From Darkness	Eezee	Studio album	1995
Warhead Records Vol. 1	Various	Compilation album	1995
"Genocide"	Genocide	EP	1996
Transcendual Consciousness	Killengod	Studio album	1996
Integrating the Extreme	Manticore	Studio album	1996
Drawn and Quartered	Cohort	Studio album	1996
Nothing	Neophobia	Studio album	1996
"Quarantine"	Volatile	EP	1996
"Hypocrisy"	Cryogenic	Single (Cassette)	1996
Thorns of Impurity	Lord Kaos	Studio album	1996
Revel in Blasphemy	Misery	Studio album	1997
Structure	Mortality	Studio album	1997
Suspended Animation	Cryogenic	Studio album	1997
"The Final Wish"	Avrigus	EP	1998
Into the Ancient Moon	Killengod	Studio album	1998
Emissions of Reality	Deadspawn	Studio Album	1999
Angel of the Sixth Order	Armoured Angel	Studio album	1999
Resurrection	Dungeon	Studio album	1999
