= Embrace the Silence =

Studio album by Vanishing Point
- Released: August 25th 2005
- Genre: Progressive metal
- Length: 69:26
- Label: Dockyard 1
- Producer: Vanishing Point

Vanishing Point chronology
Tangled in Dream (2000)	Embrace the Silence (2005)	The Fourth Season (2007)

Embrace the Silence is the third album by the Australian progressive metal band Vanishing Point.

Metal.de and Rock Hard both gave a high score, 8 out of 10.

Norway's Scream Magazine scored the album 4 out of 6. The reviewer called it a "rather pleasing metal-related listening experience, with a rich soundscape and good production". The album lacked aggression and "party factor", but the listener would "not tire immediately". Powermetal.de differed in their opinion, stating that the album did in fact get a bit boring after the third listen. "Much of 'Embrace The Silence' is simply too catchy and practically designed to clog your brain with metallic denture adhesive", the reviewer stated, and blamed the keyboards for being too prominent in the sound. Still, the record was "brimming with symphonic melodic metal that creaks with a slightly progressive edge", performed as "technically excellent music".

Vampster echoed the opinion that Embrace the Silence consisted of "solid, slightly progressive melodic metal" with "professional production". Curiously, Vampster noted that on the opening track, "The chorus sounds suspiciously like the dreadful 'My Heart Will Go On' by the scrawny, wailing Celine Dion".

== Track listing ==
1. "Hollow" - 7:07
2. "My Virtue" - 5:23
3. "If Only I" - 5:21
4. "Live To Live" - 5:54
5. "Embraced" - 6:42
6. "Season Of Sundays" - 6:39
7. "Once A Believer" - 7:01
8. "Reason" - 6:06
9. "Breathe" - 6:29
10. "Somebody Save Me" - 4:29
11. "Insight" - 5:08
12. "A Life Less" - 6:59
13. "As I Reflect" - 6:08

== Personnel ==
- Adrian Alimic − bass
- Leonard Kopilas - keyboards
- Jack Lukic − drums
- Silvio Massaro − vocals
- Chris Porcianko − guitar
- Tom Vucur − guitar
