= Steve Ravic =

Australian film director

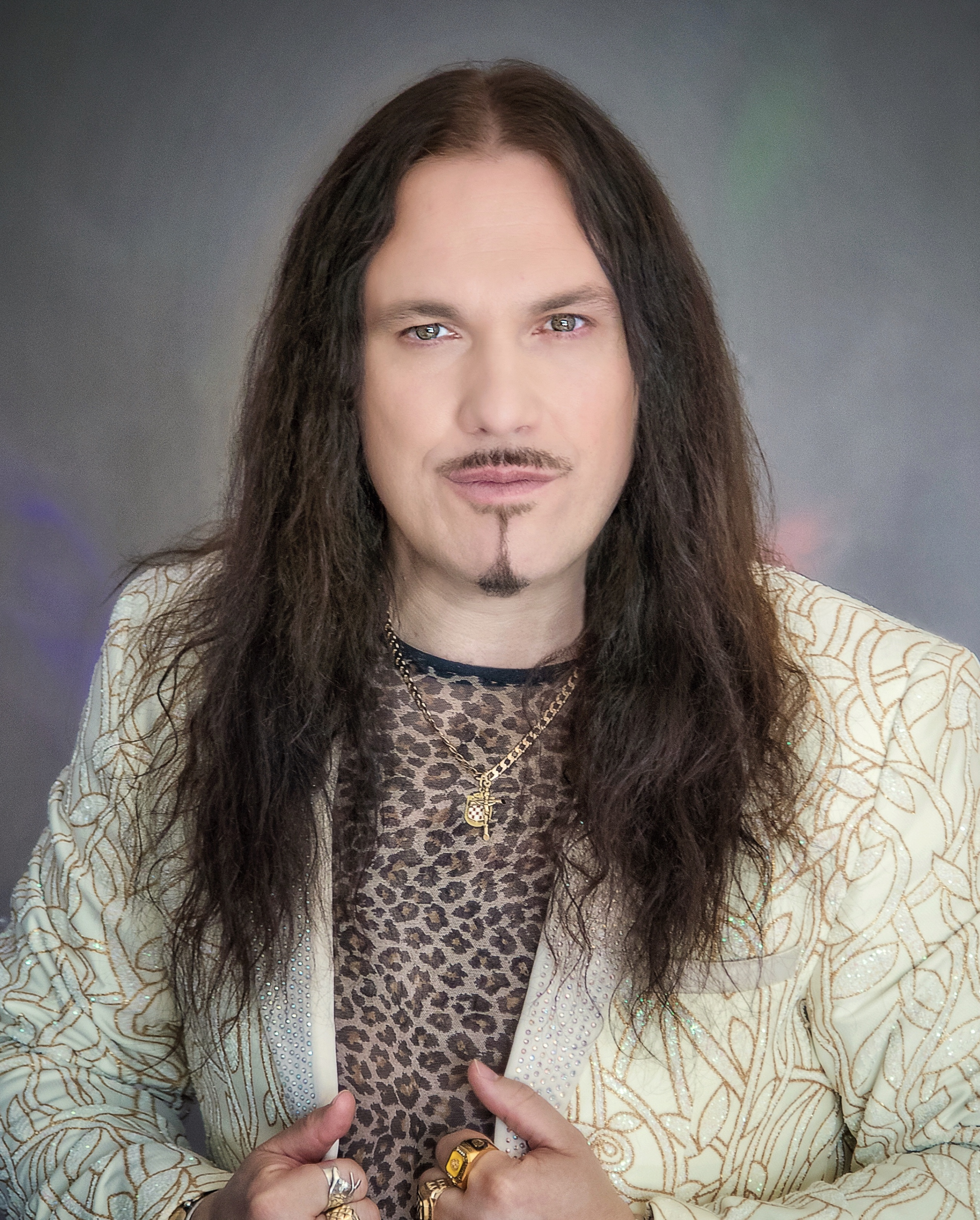

Steve Ravic (born Stipe Ravić; 19 November 1973 in Melbourne, Australia) is an Australian film director, producer, writer and editor, who is also known for his work in the music industry, journalism and public speaking and mentoring engagements.

After a career in investigative journalism and producing public television and radio, Ravic went on to create live concert coverage, music videos and feature ‘rockumentary’ films internationally since the 1990s.

He has collaborated with Neil Johnson on several film and music related projects and worked with various music artists all over the world including Edguy, Doro, Manowar, Gamma Ray, Rhapsody, Destruction, The Poodles, Dungeon, Paragon, Black Majesty MYSTERY and Thompson, including the artists world-record breaking ticketed concert in Zagreb attended by 504,000 people.

Having branched out from music related projects, Ravic began to focus on feature films, most recently working with artist Charles Billich on the completed documentary Billich: Beyond the Canvas and also returning to investigative journalism to research for the development of the Billich biopic My Way as well as completing action/thriller Hotel Underground which premiered at Cannes and is released worldwide by ITN starring the likes of the Cowboy James Storm, Andy McPhee, Tracey Birdsall and Kaori Kawabuchi.

In 2025 Ravic completed a follow up documentary on Charles Billich called Billich 90 which premiered at Cannes on May 15, 2025, to symbolically coincide with the 80th anniversary of the Bleiburg tragedy where Communist Yugoslavia committed multiple massacres and war crimes on fleeing Croatian and other Axis forces.

Ravic continues to write feature stories for the leading international Croatian newspaper from Australia, Vjesnik (Croatian Herald) and Croportal from Croatia and engages in various events like Top Model competitions and community events like hosting multicultural fashion parades.

Ravic has also spoken at many prominent seminars and conferences including panel discussions and other types of speaking engagements with other public figures and leaders in their respective fields. Ravic spoke at the ACAP conference in Zagreb where other speakers included former President of Croatia Kolinda Grabar Kitarovic and Prime Minister of Croatia Andrej Plenkovic.

Ravic was also awarded by the Croatian Club for International Cooperation (a United Nations member in New York) for his dedication to truth, justice, and the promotion of human rights, as well as for his efforts in establishing and opening an arts complex called the Arts Villa in Melbourne, Australia housing Majestic Film and the Billich Museum and Gallery with a goal to promote and provide networking opportunities for creators in various arts. Steve Ravic has been involved in investigative reporting into injustices carried out on famous artist Charles Billich. The campaign has been acknowledged in the Senate at Federal Parliament of Australia by Senator Hollie Hughes on May 10, 2023.

Ravic and Majestic Film showcased Croatian filmmaker Branko Peric from Bosnia andHercegovina at Cannes. His efforts have been acknowledged by major press in Croatia, Bosnia and Herzegovina and other European publications.

In 2025, Ravic hosted thepremiere of the film Diva by Branko Perić at the Cannes Market. Ravic is producing and directing a documentary about the biggest ticketed concert in the world featuring Thompson and his fans, the Croatian people.

Steve Ravic is an advocate for veterans, Ravic has been vocally lobbying for better support for veterans including opportunities to engage more in society and contribute more to their communities. This also includes himself providing platforms for filmmakers and artists effected by war hosting them and helping promote their projects or contributions to the arts at major events like the Cannes Film Festival where Ravic and Majestic Film have a stand annually.

Ravic is often referred to as a cultural ambassador for Croatia. The Australian Croatian was awarded the Večernjakova Domovnica for his work in film presented by Croatia’s leading daily Večernji List and Fenix in Germany.

== Early life ==
Ravic was (born Stipe Ravic on 19 November 1973) in the western suburbs of Melbourne, Australia to Croatian immigrants that fled communist Yugoslavia during its occupation of Croatia. Ravic was raised in St. Albans (a suburb of Melbourne). Ravic grew up in and has become a prominent and active member of the Croatian diaspora community in Australia and has worked with numerous notable Australian Croatians as well as prolific Croatians internationally.

== Career ==
In 2003 Ravic promoted a tour for German Metal singer Doro and also co-directed and co-produced Doro: Für Immer (2003) and Doro: 20 Years Anniversary, A Warrior Soul (2006), originally broadcast on German TV and released on DVD in 2006.

In 2005/2006, Ravic was recruited by the Australian Government to be a peer / advisor for the Australia Council For The Arts. His duties included reviewing grant applications and providing professional advice on projects relating to international touring for bands. Ravic eventually resigned his position to be able to focus on his own projects.

In 2007, Ravic completed his first feature film Metal Warrior an off-beat street drama directed, written by and starring himself which was released theatrically in Australia in 2010.

In 2010 Frontier Records released Ravic's documentary on Sweden's chart-topping band The Poodles, The Poodles: In The Flesh which released to awards and critical acclaim.

In 2014, Ravic completed the film MYSTERY: Born To Rock starring the Australian teenage Rock/Metal band MYSTERY (which features his son Rocky on vocals and lead guitar) as well as managing the band from 2012 to 2017. Mystery were formed in 2010 by the then-13-year-old Rocky Ravic and have since gone on to release four albums and tour internationally numerous times.

In 2016, Ravic completed comedy film Diary of a Fatman a comedy film starring Steven Haar which won several awards.

In 2019, Ravic directed and produced the documentary on Charles Billich called, Billich: Beyond The Canvas which premiered at the Cannes Film Festival Marche in 2019 winning best documentary and Best Director at the Los Angeles Motion Picture Festival.

In 2022, the action/thriller movie Hotel Underground directed and produced by Steve Ravic (Starring James Storm and Tracey Birdsall) premiered at the Cannes Film Festival and released by House Of Film in 2023. Steve Ravic won Best Director Grand Jury and the movie won Best Picture Grand Jury at the Los Angeles Motion Picture Festival.

Continuing on from this, Ravic is currently developing a biopic about Charles Billich entitled My Way

On May 2, 2023 Steve Ravic was announced to be a part of the prestigious “Croats United By A Tie” exhibition alongside names like Croatian National Football manager Zlatko Dalić, artist Charles Billich and singer songwriter Miljenko Matijevic among many others public figures. Ravic’s film was screened where he was also a guest speaker at the event in Dubrovnik, Croatia attended by Dubrovnik Mayor Mate Franković and Minister For Croats Living Abroad Zvonko Milas.

On January 11, 2025 Ravic opened an arts complex in Melbourne Australia of which he is a co-owner. The complex referred to as the Arts Villa is home to Majestic Film and Entertainment and the Billich Museum and Gallery which has been opened in collaboration with Christa and Charles Billich. Along with Vesna Trokter and Ante Ravic. The complex was also opened to provide networking opportunities for aspiring and established artists in various arts.

In 2025, The Association of Croatian American Professionals (ACAP) presented Ravic with an award for his speaking engagements and his contributions to the promotion of Croatian art, film, and music.
