= Tangled in Dream =

Studio album by Vanishing Point
- Released: 12 December 2000
- Genre: Progressive metal
- Length: 70:04
- Label: Metal Warriors; Limb Music
- Producer: Vanishing Point

Vanishing Point chronology
In Thought (1997)	Tangled in Dream (2000)	Embrace the Silence (2005)

Professional ratings
Review scores
Source	Rating
Metal Storm	9/10

Tangled in Dream is the second album by the Australian progressive metal band Vanishing Point. On the Australian release of the CD, the track On the Turning Away originally by Pink Floyd is included as a bonus track.

The album was re-released in 2017 as a double disc with various material.

== Reception ==
Powermetal.de's reviewer saw the album as almost peerless. Transcending the progressive metal genre, the band was "outrageously good" and their album filled with "brilliant performances throughout almost seventy minutes, subtly and with utmost professionalism". The songwriting showcased "incredibly vast creative potential"; in particular, the song "Never Walk Away" was "the absolute highlight" of Tangled in Dream: "Here, the six-piece band combines every conceivable stylistic device they possess, creating a song that is virtually unparalleled in its wealth of ideas and expressive power".

Rock Hard was positive as well, scoring the album as an 8.

In a short review, Allmusic characterized Tangled in Dream as "a bit boring in its lack of uniqueness" and failing to rise "above the level of the rest of the pack". Vampster concluded along the same lines: "Vanishing Point are simply far too unspectacular (to put it neutrally). A CD for a very limited audience".

== Track listing ==
1. "Surreal" - 6:01
2. "Samsara" - 4:12
3. "Closer Apart" - 5:42
4. "Bring on the Rain" - 6:31
5. "Never Walk Away" - 8:16
6. "The Real You" - 5:24
7. "Two Minds and One Soul" - 4:11
8. "I Will Awake" - 6:02
9. "Dancing With the Devil" - 4:32
10. "Father (7 Years)" - 8:06
11. "Tangled in a Dream" - 2:46
12. "On The Turning Away" - 3:26

== Credits ==
=== Band members ===
- Joe Del Mastro − bass
- Danny Olding - keyboards
- Jack Lukic − drums
- Silvio Massaro − vocals
- Chris Porcianko − guitar
- Tom Vucur − guitar

=== Guest musicians ===
- Pep Sammartino − backing vocals
- Gio Caveliere - backing vocals
- Dorina Morelli - backing vocals
