= In Thought =

Studio album by Vanishing Point
- Released: 1997
- Genre: Progressive metal
- Length: 49:16
- Label: Angular/Metal Warriors
- Producer: Paul "Woody" Annison; Vanishing Point

Vanishing Point chronology
In Thought (1997)	Tangled in Dream (2000)

In Thought is the debut album by the Australian progressive metal band Vanishing Point.

Writing about a 2006 repress of the album, Metal.de opined that there was "no need to reheat the same old mediocre ones". The music was not good enough as to "justify a purchase", and the production was also "lackluster" with distractingly "muddy guitars". The score was therefore 5 out of 10. Rock Hard also gave a mediocre review of 6.5/10. Powermetal.de stated that they would rather see another European tour by Vanishing Point than a re-press of In Thought, which was not "nearly as polished as the subsequent albums".

== Track listing ==
1. "The Only One" − 4:07
2. "Vanishing Point" − 5:54
3. "Wind" (Instrumental) − 0:46
4. "In Company of Darkness" − 6:57
5. "Dream Maker" − 5:10
6. "Sunlit Windows" − 4:46
7. "Blind" − 4:15
8. "Forgotten Self" − 5:46
9. "A Memory" − 8:10
10. "Inner Peace" −3:25

== Credits ==
=== Band members ===
- Joe Del Mastro − bass
- Jack Lukic − drums
- Silvio Massaro − vocals
- Andrew Whitehead − guitar
- Tom Vucur − guitar

=== Guest musicians ===
- Pep Sammartino − guitar, keyboards, backing vocals
- Jamie Schultz - guitars (acoustic) (Track 2)

=== Production and other arrangements ===
- Andrew Blobel: Photography
- Adam Dempsey: Editing
- Endel Rivers: Producer, Engineer, Mastering, Mixing
- Jamie Schultz: Assistant Engineer
- Steve Smart: Mastering
- Nathan Smith: Graphic Design, Cover Design
- Vanishing Point: Producer
- Scott McMahon: Graphic Design
- Tom Mikulik: Graphic Design, Cover Design
- MJM: Mastering
- Anthony Pell: Assistant Engineer
