= Distant Is the Sun =

Studio album by Vanishing Point
- Released: 18 February 2014
- Genres: Progressive metal, power metal
- Length: 63:00
- Label: AFM

Vanishing Point chronology
The Fourth Season (2007)	Distant Is the Sun (2014)	Dead Elysium (2020)

Distant Is the Sun is the fifth album by the Australian progressive metal band Vanishing Point.

Tony Kakko of Sonata Arctica made a guest appearance on "Circle of Fire".

== Reception ==
Rock Hard gave the album a 8.5 out of 10 score, Metal Express Radio gave 8, whereas according to Powermetal.de it deserved a 9/10 score. Hands down, Vanishing Point was "the best melodic metal band in the world right now". This album was more subtle than the previous; with "sophisticated and subtle" and "finely balanced" arrangements, "intelligent compositions and a truly unique aesthetic quality". The songwriting had resulted in "a wealth of wonderful, truly enchanting melodies and enduring hooks", with excellent performances as well. Finally, the band stood out from similar acts by managing to create a "soothingly warm atmosphere". The same score, 4.5 out of 5, was given by Australia's The Music.

Norway's Scream Magazine scored the album 3 out of 6. There was no drawbacks in musicianship or production, but except for "Let the River Run", the songwriting was very bland, "not particularly engaging", "dime-a-dozen, middle-of-the-road power metal and lighter prog".

== Track listing ==
1. "Beyond Redemption (Intro)" – 1:00
2. "King of Empty Promises" – 4:48
3. "Distant Is the Sun" – 4:46
4. "When Truth Lies" – 5:17
5. "Circle of Fire" – 4:47
6. "Let the River Run" – 5:55
7. "Denied Deliverance" – 4:30
8. "Story of Misery" – 4:44
9. "Era Zero" – 3:30
10. "Pillars of Sand" – 5:50
11. "As December Fades" – 4:31
12. "Handful of Hope" – 4:20
13. "Walls of Silence" – 4:35
14. "April" – 4:27

== Personnel ==
- Silvio Massaro — vocals
- James Maier — guitars
- Chris Porcianko — guitars
- Simon Best — bass
- Christian Nativo — drums
