= The Fourth Season =

Studio album by Vanishing Point
- Released: 2007
- Genre: Progressive metal
- Length: 49:07
- Label: Dockyard 1
- Producer: Vanishing Point

Vanishing Point chronology
Embrace the Silence (2005)	The Fourth Season (2007)	Distant Is the Sun (2014)

The Fourth Season is the fourth album by the Australian progressive metal band Vanishing Point.

Metal.de referred to an "oversaturated market" for power metal; "humanity has seen enough bands that play Power Metal". It was therefore difficult to break the mold, and while Vanishing Point tried to stand out, "somehow they don't quite manage to break out of the old patterns or combine them into something new". The band showcased enough qualities to avoid "utter irrelevance", but only for a 5 out of 10 score. The same score was given by Heavymetal.dk. Vampster's review was overwhelmingly negative, calling the music "disappointing", "lifeless and sterile". "Both the music and its execution are as bland as plain tofu", and "only the cover art remains remarkable".

Rock Hard was more positive, scoring the album as a 7. Powermetal.de opined that The Fourth Season was more various than previous Vanishing Point records, thus it "shows no signs of wear and tear, even after repeated listens". Though individual songs could be characterized as both a "slight weakness" and a "true masterpiece of melodic metal", the overall impression was very good.

== Track listing ==
1. "Embodiment" - 4:06
2. "The Tyranny Of Distance" - 5:25
3. "Surrender" - 4:09
4. "Hope Among The Heartless" - 5:13
5. "Gaia - The Path To The Unknown (Instrumental)" - 1:37
6. "I Within I" - 4:03
7. "Beyond The Open Door" - 4:04
8. "Ashen Sky" - 4:59
9. "One Foot In Both Worlds" - 5:32
10. "Wake Me" - 4:32
11. "Day Of Difference" - 4:53

== Credits ==
- Silvio Massaro — vocals
- James Maier — guitars
- Chris Porcianko — guitars
- Simon Best — bass
- Chris Nativo — drums
