= Resurrection Cemetery =

Resurrection Cemetery is the name of many cemeteries, including around 40 in the United States. The name may refer to:

- Resurrection Cemetery (Justice, Illinois) — a Roman Catholic cemetery in Justice, Illinois
- Resurrection Cemetery (Madison, Wisconsin) — a Roman Catholic cemetery in Madison, Dane County, Wisconsin, USA, in the Roman Catholic Diocese of Madison
- Resurrection Cemetery (Mendota Heights, Minnesota) — a Roman Catholic cemetery in Minnesota
- Cemetery of the Resurrection — a Roman Catholic cemetery on Staten Island (Richmond County), New York
- Saint Charles Cemetery — a Roman Catholic cemetery also known as "St. Charles/Resurrection Cemeteries" in Farmingdale, Suffolk County, New York, in the Roman Catholic Diocese of Brooklyn
