= Nazxul =

Australian black metal band

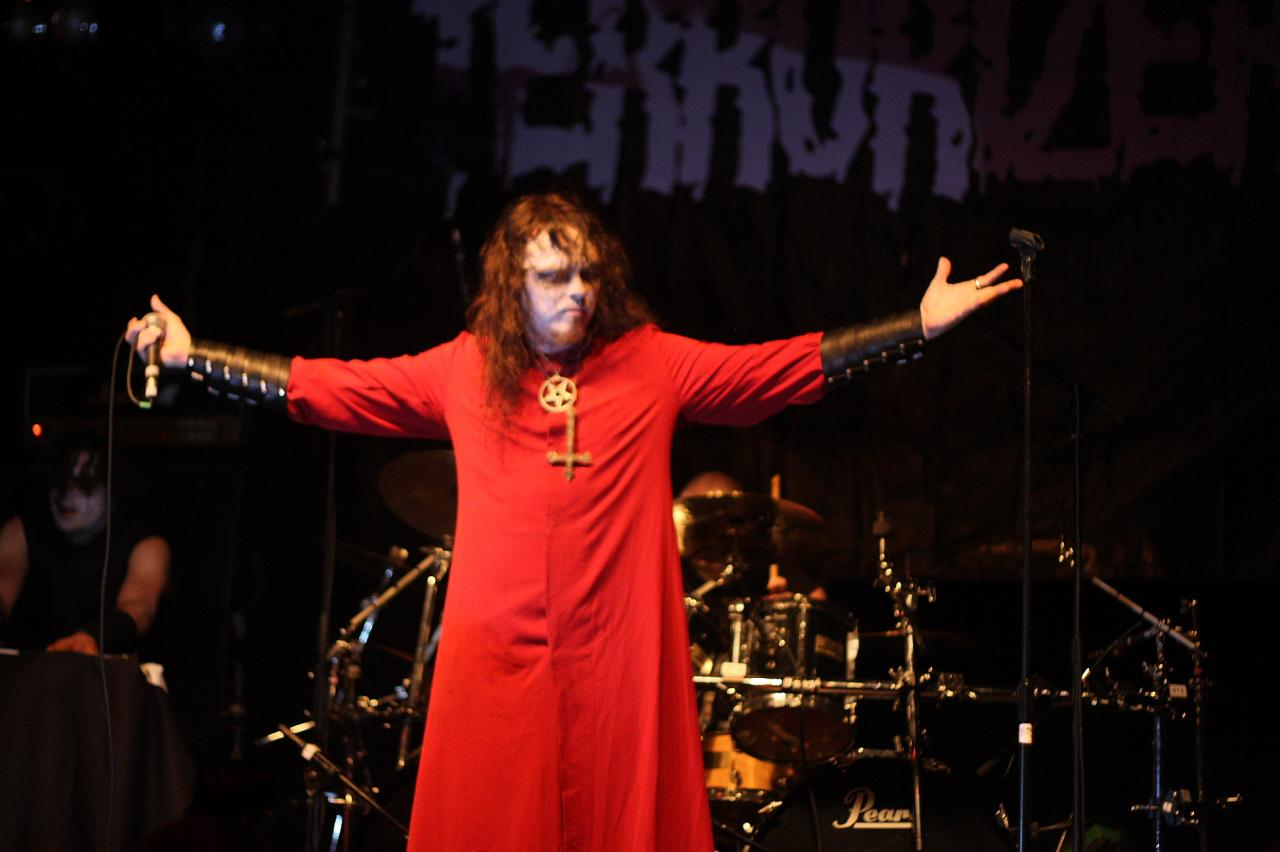
- Nazxul performing at the Damnation Festival, Leeds in October 2009

Background information
- Origin: Sydney, New South Wales, Australia
- Genre: Black metal
- Years active: 1993–present
- Labels: Vampire; Shock; Hekal Xul; Decius; Eisenwald; Moribund; Seance
- Members: Adrian Henderson; Lachlan Mitchell; Dalibor Backovic; John McLaughlin
- Past members: Greg Morelli; Daniel Lomas; Rev. Kriss Hades; Peter Kostic; Steve Hughes; Morte; Tim Yatras; Petar Peric; Mitch Keepin; Luke Mills

Nazxul are an Australian black metal band formed in 1993. They issued the studio albums Totem (March 1995) and Iconoclast (July 2009). In March 2021, they released their most recent album, Irkalla, with Adrian Henderson on guitar, Lachlan Mitchell on keyboards and guitar, drummer John McLaughlin, and Dalibor Backovic on vocals and bass guitar.

== History ==
=== Early years and Totem (1993–1997) ===
Guitarist Adrian Henderson, keyboards player-guitarist Lachlan Mitchell, former Mortal Sin and Slaughter Lord drummer Steve Hughes, and Dalibor Backovic on vocals and bass guitar formed Nazxul in 1993. Envisioned as a mysterious studio project, the group appeared in publicity photos as shadowy figures or draped in cloaks.

In 1994, a self-titled demo album appeared through Vampire Records. According to Voltage Media, it was "met with a mixture of astonishment and ultimate praise from critics, allegiance and enthusiasm by extreme music disciples, and revulsion by the ignorant and myopic." Soon after, guitarist Greg Morelli, from Sydney thrash band Grungeon, joined the band. They began work on the band's first album, Totem. Though reviews were mixed, the debut was praised throughout the underground.

=== "Black Seed" (1998-2007) and touring ===
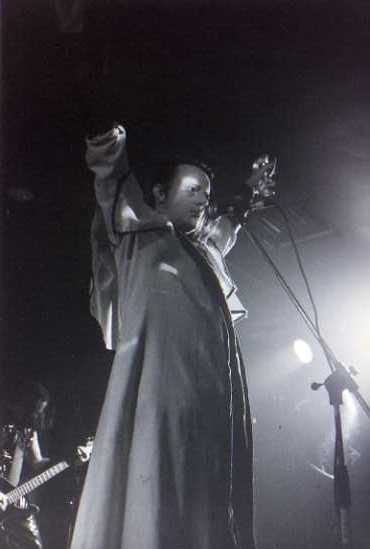
Nazxul live, Sydney, 1999

They wrote further material. Backovic left. Singer Morte, from avant garde black metal group Bestianity, and guitarist Rev. Kriss Hades, from Sydney death metal band Sadistik Exekution, joined. This line-up produced the EP Black Seed in 1998, and, late in the year, played live for the first time at a show in Sydney, with Henderson on bass.

Hughes left the group to pursue a career in stand-up comedy. He movedlive to the UK. Peter Kostic, from Sydney rock band Front End Loader, replaced him. Nazxul was booked to support Finnish extreme metal group Impaled Nazarene on part of an Australian tour. Kostic's other band was approached to tour with British rock group Skunk Anansie over the same period, but declined due to the drummer's commitment to Nazxul. The Skunk Anansie tour was cancelled when the group split up. Morte was fired after this tour. Backovic returned for Nazxul's appearance at the Metal for the Brain festival. In the meantime, Black Seed was re-released with several bonus live tracks recorded during the tour. The cover was rendered in gold instead of green.

After playing a final show for the year, activity from Nazxul appeared to cease. Kostic joined Regurgitator in 2000 and the Hard Ons in 2001. Hades recorded two more albums with Sadistik Exekution before starting a solo career. Mitchell continued working as a professional sound engineer and producer, and, in late 2001, formed rock band Brace with former members of Canberra group Henry's Anger. Backovic left Nazxul in 2000 to pursue a career as a screenplay writer and director. In 2002, Sydney black metal label Decius released a limited-edition live album titled Live on 12" vinyl. It was a recording of the group's 1999 Metal for the Brain performance. A year later, the Nazxul track "Apostasies Legions Arise, Xul!" appeared on a compilation from Hiberica Records, along with tracks from American band Krieg, Necroplasma from Sweden and Goat Semen from Peru.

Four dark ambience tracks recorded by Henderson, Mitchell and Morelli, were released on a split EP with Melek Tha in 2004. That year, Nazxul regrouped with a line-up that included Henderson, Morelli and Mitchell, plus two former members of Wollongong black metal band Secretain, Daniel Lomas (vocals) and Luke Mills (guitar), and drummer Tim Yatras from Wollongong band Battalion. Originally booked to tour with Dimmu Borgir, the Norwegian band cancelled its visit. Several months later, Nazxul toured with Adelaide-based gothic metal band Virgin Black. Nazxul became inactive for some time. Mills continued playing in various black metal bands, and Yatras played drums with Lord between 2005 and May 2009.

=== "Iconoclast" (2008–present) and touring ===
In 2008, Nazxul reformed and were listed as the national support to the Australian leg of Mayhem's tour. This tour was cancelled. The band completed the Iconoclast album, first mooted in 1998, during the year. Greg Morelli died in a motorcycle accident on 20 November 2008 in North Strathfield. He had completed his guitar parts for the album. "Oath (Fides Resurrectio)" is performed in his honour.

German label Eisenwald Records released Iconoclast in July 2009. Guitarist Petar Peric from Infernal Method replaced Morelli, and drummer John McLaughlin replaced Yatras.

International touring went ahead at the end of 2009 with shows in England, Germany, the Netherlands, Belgium and Russia.

Nazxul released Irkalla in March 2021.

== Discography ==
Studio albums

- Totem (22 March 1995)
- Iconoclast (27 July 2009)
- Irkalla (22 March 2021)

Live albums

- Live (2002)

Demos

- Nazxul (1994)

EPs

- Black Seed (1998)
- Quickener of the Dead (2010)

Split albums

- 4 Spears in God's Ribs (2003)
- Develish Purification (2004)—with Melek-Tha
