= Iconoclast (Nazxul album) =

Studio album by Nazxul
- Released: 27 July 2009
- Recorded: SLS Studios in Wollongong, Australia and Production Avenue Studios in New South Wales, Australia
- Genre: Black metal Experimental
- Label: Moribund Records; Eisenwald (Europe)

Nazxul chronology
Develish Purification (2004)	Iconoclast (2009)

Professional ratings
Review scores
Source	Rating
Allmusic	3.5/5 stars
Terrorizer	8.5/10 stars

Iconoclast is the second studio album by Australian black metal band Nazxul. The album, released through Moribund Records, was the band's first studio release in more than a decade, as their Black Seed EP was released in 1998.

== Track listing ==
1. Apoptosis
2. Dragon Dispitous
3. III
4. Black Wings
5. V
6. Iconoclast
7. I
8. Set in Array
9. II
10. Symbol of Night & Winter (Ancient Lords)
11. Oath (Fides Resurrectio)
12. Stain of Harrow
13. World Oblivion
14. Threnody

== Lineup ==
- Adrian Henderson - bass, keyboards
- Timothy James Yatras - drums, keyboards, vocals
- Greg Andrew Morelly - guitar
- Mitchell Keepin - guitar
- Lachlan Mitchell - keyboards
- Luke Mills - vocals
