= Resurrection from the dead =

Resurrection from the dead (or similar terms) may refer to:

- Resurrection, the coming back to life after death
- Universal resurrection, the final resurrection at the end time
- Resurrection of Jesus, the Christian belief
- The resurrection of the undead, in various religions and in popular culture
