= Lord (band) =

Australian power metal band

LORD
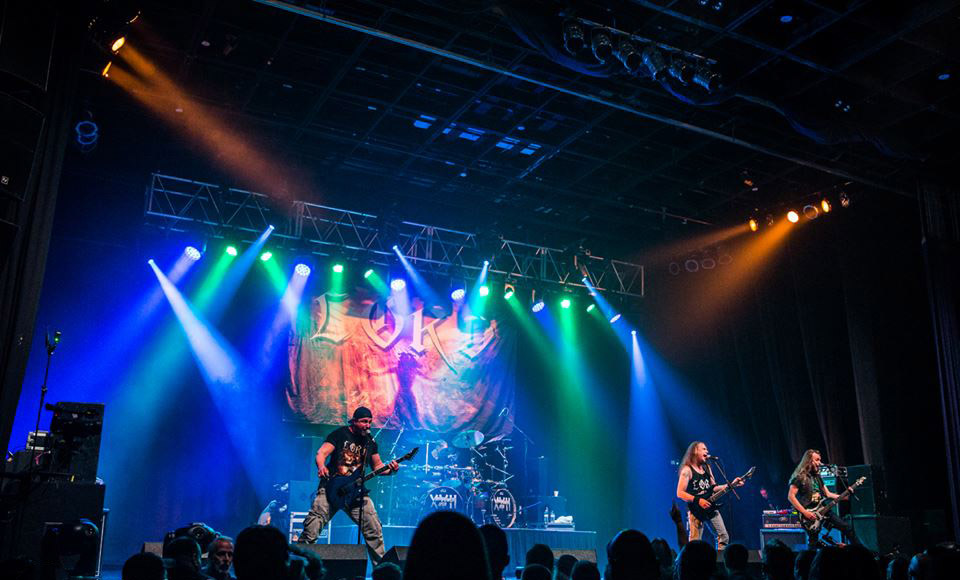
- LORD live at ProgPower USA in Atlanta

Background information
- Origin: Wollongong, New South Wales, Australia
- Genres: Power metal, heavy metal
- Years active: 2003–2023
- Labels: Dominus, Modern Invasion, Riot!
- Past members: Lord Tim; Andy Dowling; Mark Furtner; Darryl Murphy; Mav Stevens; Tim Yatras; Damian "Damo" Costas
- Website: lord.net.au

Lord (sometimes stylised as LORD) were an Australian power metal band from Wollongong, New South Wales. The band began as a solo side project for "Lord Tim" Grose of Dungeon in 2003, and expanded into a complete band when Dungeon broke up in 2005. LORD appeared with major acts that include Queensrÿche, Nightwish, Nevermore, Saxon and Gamma Ray. The band's name is usually stylised in all capital letters. The band quietly split in late 2023, and their breakup was announced in early 2025.

== History ==
=== Pre-history: 1988-2005 ===
Between 1988 and 2000, Dungeon singer/guitarist and founding member "Lord Tim" Grose had collected a number of compositions he felt were either too personal to submit to the band or inappropriate for its style. In 2003, he collected these songs on an album called A Personal Journey that was issued under the name LORD. At the end of 2005, Dungeon came to an end and LORD became a band featuring Grose and drummer Tim Yatras (also of Dungeon), along with guitarist Mav Stevens and bass player Andy Dowling from Brisbane metal band Sedition. Yatras has also been a member of several black metal bands including Nazxul, Austere and Battalion. A Personal Journey was re-mastered and released to mark the occasion.

=== First live shows and departure of Yatras: 2006-2009 ===
LORD performed their first live show on 31 March 2006. The group launched a national tour within months and before the end of the year had opened for Queensrÿche, Nevermore, Gamma Ray, Leaves' Eyes, Atrocity and Skinless, and appeared at the final Metal for the Brain festival. On 23 December 2006, it was announced that guitarist Stevens would be leaving the band for personal reasons and would be relocating to the United Kingdom. Shane Linfoot of Sydney band Transcending Mortality filled in as a live guitarist in early 2007 but due to both bands' hectic schedules, Linfoot departed to be replaced by FromBeyond guitarist Mark Furtner, originally in a temporary capacity but his addition was made permanent in December 2007. Furtner's work had already appeared on the August 2007 album Ascendence. Chris Brooks also contributed guest guitars by way of the solos in "Rain" and "Through the Fire".

The band toured the Australian east coast with Saxon in May 2008. After this Lord began working on a third album. The EP "Hear No Evil" appeared in late 2008, featuring two new songs, live tracks and a cover of Kylie Minogue's "On a Night Like This". The Set in Stone album was released in September 2009 and included guest contributions from Craig Goldy of Dio, Glen Drover of Eidolon, Pete Lesperance of Harem Scarem, Angra's Felipe Andreoli, Vanishing Point's Chris Porcianko, Justin Sayers from Platinum Brunette, Chris Brooks, and Stu Marshall of Paindivision. Lord completed wide-scale touring of Australia, New Zealand and Japan in 2009.

In June 2009, Tim Yatras left the band and was replaced by Damian Costas from Sydney band Vanquish. During January 2010, Lord Tim announced that a medical condition had severely restricted his guitar-playing and was advised to take at least six months off from playing guitar. Temporary guitarist, Matthew Bell, filled in during his recovery.

=== Continued success, Fallen Idols and Undercovers': 2010-2021 ===
In September 2010, LORD released the "Return of the Tyrant" EP which featured a ten-minute-long orchestrated title track and six unplugged versions of Dungeon and LORD songs, with a playing time of nearly an hour. This was followed by their fourth studio album Digital Lies in 2013.

Fallen Idols, the band's fifth full-length album and their first in six years, was released in Australia in August 2019, by the band's own label Dominus. Drummer Tim Yatras returns as a session member for this album. The album's first single and music video "United (Welcome Back)" was released in February 2019. Fallen Idols hit the Australian Artist Album Charts at #20.

Following the success of Fallen Idols, bassist Andy Dowling started a 10-part podcast series titled "Nod to the Old School", "all about the old school generation mixtape and metal compilations." Guests who had participated in the podcast include Andy LaRocque (King Diamond), David Ellefson (Megadeth), Johnny Dee (Doro), and Lord Tim, among others.

In 2021 the released a covers album entitles Undercovers Vol.1. It once again hit the Australian Artist Album Chart this time at #7 and the Independent Australian Album Charts at #1. The Album was released to showcase all of Lords cover songs that they have recorded over the years, and to bring them all together on one release. This was to give fans the opportunity to maybe hear a song for the first time that may have been on a particular countries exclusive release. The Album also showcased a few new cover songs including To the Moon and Back by Savage Garden and Reckless by Judas Priest.

=== Disbandment: 2025-present ===
On 17 February 2025, Dowling and Furtner posted a statement to Lord's Instagram page, stating that the band had disbanded in 2023 after becoming aware of a criminal matter, which has not been specified due to Australian laws keeping criminal allegations towards innocent people private and confidential. A week later, after the band's social media presence had been deleted, Dowling would reupload the statement to his personal Instagram account and expand on it, also making the band's music free to download from their Bandcamp page. He explained the decision to leave the Bandcamp page up by stating that Lord's body of work was "20 years of investment that [he and Furtner] are proud of".

== Members ==
Final lineup

- Lord Tim – lead vocals, guitar, keyboards
- Andy Dowling – bass, vocals
- Mark Furtner – guitar, vocals

Former

- Mav Stevens (2005–2006) – guitars, vocals
- Shane Linfoot (live only, 2007) – guitar
- Tim Yatras (2005–2009, 2019) – drums, vocals
- Damian Costas (2009–2014) – drums
- Matthew Bell (live only, 2010) – guitar
- Simon Batley (live only, 2013–2014) – drums
- Darryl Murphy (live only, 2016–2018) – drums

== Discography ==
=== Studio albums ===
Title	Details
A Personal Journey	Released: 2003; Label: Metal Warriors (MWGOLD-03-03-9)
Ascendence	Released: 4 September 2007; Label: Modern Invasion Music (MIM7357-2CD)
Set in Stone	Released: September 2009; Label: Dominus Records (DOM09001)
Digital Lies	Released: February 2013; Label: Dominus Records (DOM13001)
A Personal Journey: Revisited	Released: March 2016; Label: Dominus Records
Fallen Idols	Released: August 2019; Label: Dominus Records (DOM19001)

=== Live albums ===
Title	Details
Live at The Metro	Released: 2009; Label: Dominus Records (DOM07001CDAU)
Live at Prog Power USA XVII	Released: 2017; Label: Dominus Records (DOM18001)

=== Compilation albums ===
Title	Details
The Dungeon Era	Released: 2014; Label: Dominus Records (DOM14001); Box set / 4 CD; Limited pressing – 500 copies
Undercovers Vol.1	Released: 2021; Label: Dominus Records (DOM21001)

=== EPs ===
Title	Details
Hear No Evil	Released: October 2008; Label: Dominus Records (DOM08002AU); Limited pressing – 500 copies
Return of the Tyrant	Released: September 2010; Label: Dominus Records (DOM10001); Limited pressing – 500 copies
What Tomorrow Brings	Released: 2015; Label: Dominus Records (DOM15001)
Chaos Raining	Released: June 2020; Label: Dominus Records (DOM2002); Limited pressing – 100 copies

== Awards and nominations ==
=== AIR Awards ===
The Australian Independent Record Awards (commonly known informally as AIR Awards) is an annual awards night to recognise, promote and celebrate the success of Australia's Independent Music sector.

Year	Nominee / work	Award	Result	Ref.
2022	Undercovers Vol.1	Best Independent Heavy Album or EP	Nominated	
