= Dungeon (band) =

Australian power metal band

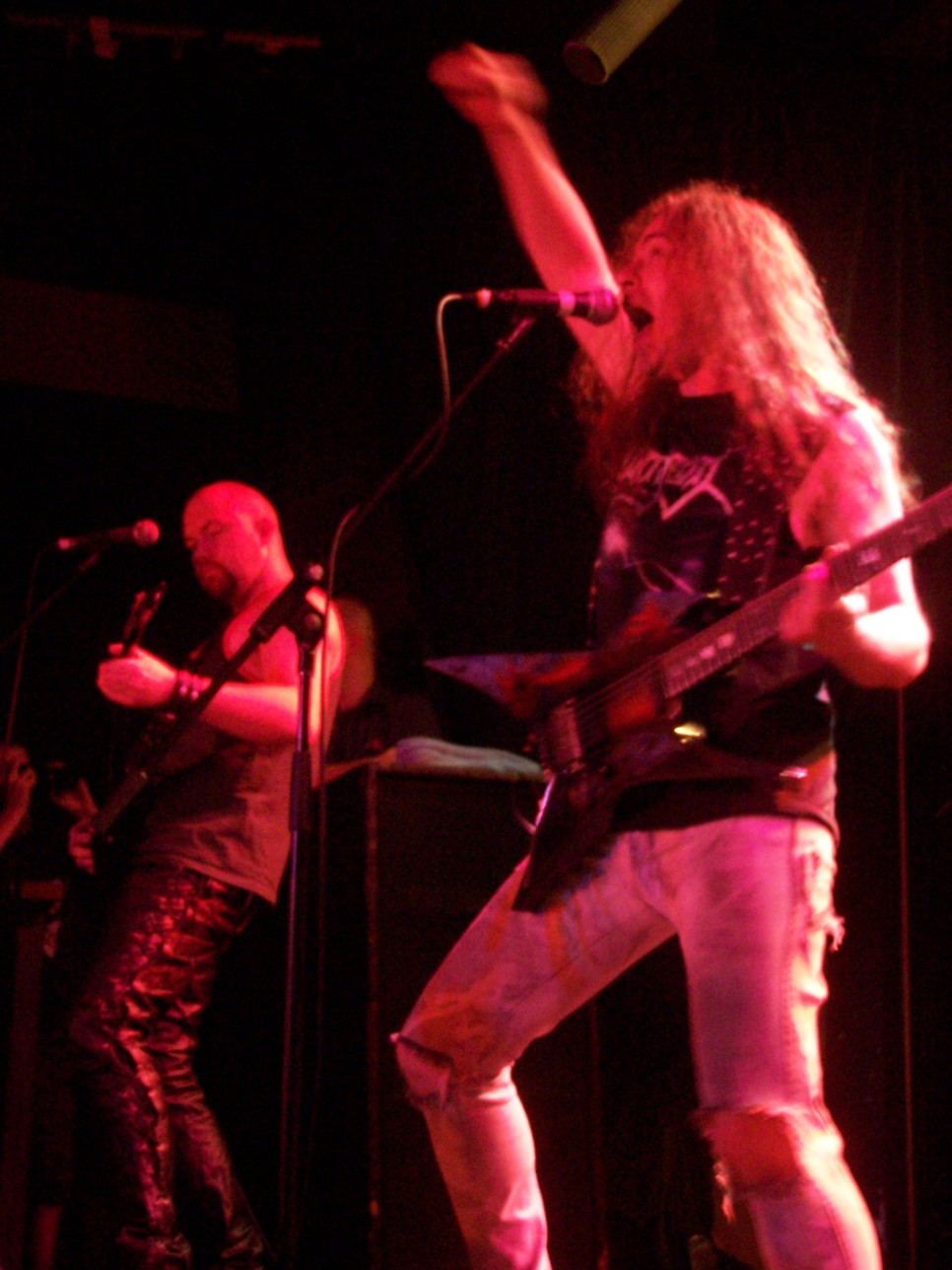
- Dungeon performing their last show on 11 December 2005

Background information
- Origin: Broken Hill, New South Wales, Australia
- Genres: Power metal, heavy metal
- Years active: 1989–2005
- Label: Modern Invasion
- Members: See below
- Website: www.dungeon.cd

Dungeon was an Australian melodic power metal band based in Sydney, considered by some as one of Australia's leading metal bands. The group existed from 1989 to 2005, released six full-length albums, and toured heavily both throughout Australia and internationally.

== History ==
=== (1989–1996) Formation and early period ===
The band was formed in the New South Wales outback mining town of Broken Hill in 1989 by guitarist Tim Grose featuring himself, bassist Eddie Tresize and drummer Ian DeBono. According to an extensive bio at the band's official website, Grose took on the singing role due to an inability to find a suitable vocalist. The band played popular rock and metal covers and shortly expanded to a five-piece with the addition of Tim's niece Carolyn Boon on keyboards and Jason Hansen on guitar. Randall Hocking replaced Tresize and by the end of 1990 the group's line up featured Grose, Boon, Jamie Baldwin (bass), Dale Fletcher (guitar) and Darryl Riess (drums). By February 1991 however, only Tim Grose remained but a short time later guitarist Dale Corney joined him and the pair wrote and played as a duo for about a year before relocating to Sydney in 1992. A demo was recorded and Grose and Corney decided to rebuild a complete band line-up.

By 1995, Dungeon's live line-up featured Grose and Corney plus Stephen Mikulic on rhythm guitar (giving the band three guitarists), George Smith on bass and Andrew Brody on drums. Several tracks were also being recorded for a demo entitled "Changing Moods", with Grose providing bass and keyboards along with guitars and lead vocals. Brody played drums on the opening track "One Shot at Life" with Jim Yannieh, who had answered an ad in the street press, laying down the drums for the songs "Paradise", "The Promise" and "Slave of Love". Neither proved technically proficient enough to play on the title track, an eight-minute instrumental, so Grose contacted BMG, with whom he had a publishing deal, for recommendations. They recommended Virgil Donati, who completed the track during a four-hour session.

Brody and Smith left Dungeon in 1996 shortly after the demo appeared and were replaced by ex-Maximum Carnage members Wayne Harris and Justin Sayers. Mikulic also departed shortly afterward. In the meantime, Japanese label TDK-Core had taken an interest in Dungeon and expressed a desire to release "Changing Moods" as an album. Instead, Dungeon chose to re-work it, remixing some of the tracks with bass lines provided by Sayers, dropping a song called "The Promise" and adding nine new recordings including a cover of Blondie's "Call Me". Released under the name Demolition, the album sold well after it was released in Japan but Harris refused to take part in any promotional activity for the CD and was fired from the band. A friend of the group, Tyrone McMaster, adopted the name Ty Blakely and appeared in promotional packages accompanying the release, however this was merely to give Dungeon the appearance of a complete line-up as McMaster was not actually in the band. It was not to be the last time Dungeon was to resort to this tactic.

In spite of Demolition's moderate success, Dungeon was dealt a blow when TDK-Core decided to stop releasing rock music. The album, which was only released in Japan, has never been re-issued.

=== (1996–2005) Major career ===
With Wayne Harris gone, Dungeon had no drummer but enough material for another album release. Around the same time, Sydney thrash band Addictive had disbanded. Drummer Steve Moore was put in touch with Dungeon through a mutual friend and by early 1997 the new line-up was rehearsed and beginning to appear regularly on the Sydney live metal circuit. Resurrection was then recorded in 1998, featuring a third version of "Paradise", keyboards from Gustav Hoffman and Sayers providing lead vocals on the tracks "Let it Go" and "Wake Up". The period of the recording process was a bleak time for the band and Grose quit at one point only to return after less than a week. Sayers was also keen to move on to other projects but he remained with Dungeon for almost another year.

Several record labels including Century Media courted the band but Dungeon signed eventually to Sydney's Warhead Records in July 1999. Warhead specialised in releasing Australian heavy metal bands and Moore had been friends with the owner Brad Sims for many years. This possibly swayed the group's decision at the time. Justin Sayers decided to leave Dungeon at this point on friendly terms and played a small number of live shows with them until he was replaced by Brendan "Dakk" McDonald. McDonald had previously played guitar in a band called Dr Zeus, the same band that had supplied Dungeon with early drummer Andrew Brody. Resurrection was released in September 1999. While it sold well among the band's growing fanbase, Warhead Records folded early the next year and the album was never re-pressed. Despite this, it won them considerable notice and Dungeon supported Yngwie Malmsteen and Nevermore late in the year before making their first appearance at the Metal for the Brain festival. They would go on to play at the event every year until 2005.

Dungeon toured solidly for another eighteen months until Dale Corney left in September 2001. Stu Marshall then joined, playing his first show with them as they headlined at Metal for the Brain. Most of the A Rise to Power album had been written and recorded by this time, although Marshall was able to contribute some lead guitar and vocal parts before it was released. In mid-2002, the group supported German power metal band Edguy on a small scale Australian tour that concluded with them signing to Melbourne metal label Metal Warriors on stage after their performance in Sydney. A Rise to Power was released shortly afterward, with Metal Warriors owner Steve Ravic helping them secure a worldwide deal with Germany's LMP. A busy live schedule rounded out the year and included support slots with Mayhem and Destruction.

In May 2003, Dungeon went to Japan for festival appearances in Tokyo and Osaka. The tour was supported by a limited-release album of remixes and covers called Rising Power. The Tokyo show was filmed and released in mid-2004 as the Under the Rising Sun DVD. Shortly afterward, LMP released A Rise to Power on the international market, featuring a completely different and cartoonish cover illustration that the band would later renounce.

Dungeon supported Opeth in early 2004 before entering the studio to work on both a follow-up to A Rise to Power and a new version of Resurrection. Tim had always expressed dissatisfaction with the original version and demands from fans for the now-deleted album convinced Dungeon to redo it. Sessions had barely begun however when McDonald left rather acrimoniously and while Grose was able to play the bass parts on the albums, the band was due to undertake another tour with Edguy. A long-time friend of the band, Glenn Williams—who was at the time playing bass with a Brisbane hard rock band called Mobstar—took over McDonald's role for the tour. Moore was also replaced by Grahame Goode from Infernal Method. While this was mooted as a temporary move, Moore confirmed his resignation from Dungeon after the tour in August 2004. Grose and Marshall then headed overseas ahead of the release of One Step Beyond, performing as a duo in Japan and Croatia with local backing musicians, and doing some other promotional work in the U.S.

One Step Beyond was released in November 2004. Echoing the band's situation at the time of Demolition, Justin Sayers appeared in the accompanying booklet photos despite not having been a member of Dungeon since 1999. Goode was retained as drummer and since Infernal Method had disintegrated, founding member Petar Peric came into the group on bass. Following a handful of shows both Goode and Peric quit after their appearance at the Canberra leg of Metal for the Brain in February 2005. Goode's departure was particularly unfriendly and an air of animosity has surrounded his relationship with Dungeon ever since. Williams returned to the line-up and long time fan and experienced drummer Tim Yatras took over Goode's role in time for the band to play at Metal for the Brain in Brisbane the following weekend. Yatras was considerably younger than the rest of the group but already had an impressive resume having featured in a string of black and death metal bands from the NSW South Coast area including Malice and Battalion, with whom he had recorded a CD. He had also been the touring drummer with Sydney black metal band Nazxul the previous year. In April, Dungeon supported Nightwish and then Angra before a national tour with Megadeth. Dave Mustaine's approval of Dungeon was so high he personally selected them to support Megadeth on a European tour in June. Dungeon then played shows in Japan before returning to Australia in August after promotional work in Canada and the U.S.

=== (2005–2007) Break-up and aftermath ===
In September 2005, after a run of shows with wrestler Chris Jericho's band Fozzy, Dungeon issued a press release on their official website announcing that due to the departure of Marshall and Williams, Tim Grose decided to put an end to the band. They performed a final show at the Gaelic Club in Surry Hills, Sydney on 11 December 2005. Justin Sayers, Dakk McDonald and Stephen Mikulic made guest appearances during the band's almost two-hour set. A final album entitled The Final Chapter was announced. Recorded by Grose and Yatras, with guests Andy Dowling (bass) and Mav Stevens (guitar), this album was released in mid-2006.

The band's various members have moved on to other projects. Grose and Yatras continued to work together under the name Lord with Dowling. This name was previously used by Grose in 2003 for a solo release. Lord continues to play the Dungeon back-catalogue live and follows a similar musical path. Both men also featured in the Newcastle studio-based power metal band Ilium until Grose announced his departure in early 2008. Stu Marshall formed a band called 20 Grams with Yatras briefly on drums and later with Jordan Howe, a one-time member of The Harlots, on vocals. This band is now known as Paindivision and has gone on to issue two albums as of mid-2010. Former bass player Sayers plays in a heavy rock / punk act called Platinum Brunette that released an EP in early 2007 and now features Lord Tim guitar. This band released an album in early 2009. Stephen Mikulic is a member of Lycanthia. Grahame Goode and Pete Peric reformed Infernal Method shortly after their brief time with Dungeon, however that group split up for good in April 2007; Goode later joined the thrash band Killrazer and Peric is now with Nazxul. Glenn Williams joined Brisbane melodic metallers Sedition (former bassist Andy Dowling had left to join Lord.) One-time drummer Steve Moore played in thrash band Vaticide and now plays in a Brisbane rock and metal band. Dakk McDonald runs a CD/DVD duplication business. Of the band's early guitarists, Dale Fletcher died from a brain haemmorhage in January 2005, Jason Hansen builds handmade guitars and Dale Corney sings for a Broken Hill metal band called Soulforge.

== Band members ==
=== Final line-up ===
- 'Lord' Tim Grose (1989–2005) – vocals, guitar, keyboard, bass
- Tim Yatras (2005) – drums

=== Former ===
- Jason Hansen (1989–1990) – guitar
- Dale Fletcher (1990–1991) – guitar
- Dale Corney (1991–2001) – guitar, vocals
- Stephen Mikulic (1992–1996) – guitar
- Stu Marshall (2001–2005) – guitar, vocals
- Eddie Trezise (1989) – bass
- Randall Hocking (1989–1990) – bass
- Jamie Baldwin (1990–1991) – bass
- George Smith (1994–1995) – bass
- Justin Sayers (1996–1999) – vocals
- Brendon McDonald (1999–2004) – bass
- Petar Peric (2004–2005) – bass
- Glenn Williams (2005) – bass
- Carolyn Boon (1989–1991) – keyboards
- Ian DeBono (1989–1990) – drums
- Darryl Reiss (1990) – drums
- Andrew Brody (1994) – drums
- Wayne Harris (1994–1995) – drums
- Tyrone McMaster – drums (1996)
- Steve Moore (1997–2004) – drums
- Grahame Goode (2004–2005) – drums

== Discography ==
Changing Moods

- Released: 1996
- Format: Demo

Demolition

- Released: 1996
- Format: CD
- Label: TDK-Core (Japan)
- Producer: Lord Tim

Resurrection

- Released: 1999
- Format: CD
- Label: Warhead Records (Australia)
- Producer: Lord Tim, Mark Worrall

A Rise to Power

- Released: 2002, 2003
- Format: CD
- Label: Metal Warriors (Australia), LMP (Germany)
- Producer: Lord Tim

Rising Power

- Released: 2003
- Format: CD
- Label: Metal Warriors (Australia)

Under the Rising Sun

- Released: 2004
- Format: DVD/CD
- Label: Metal Warriors (Australia)
- Producer: Steve Ravic (video), Lord Tim (audio)

One Step Beyond

- Released: 2004
- Format: CD
- Label: Metal Warriors (Australia), LMP (Germany), Sound Holic (Japan)
- Producer: Lord Tim

Resurrection

- Released: 2005
- Format: CD
- Label: Modern Invasion (Australia), LMP (Germany)
- Producer: Lord Tim

The Final Chapter

- Released: 2006
- Format: CD
- Label: Modern Invasion (Australia), Sound Holic (Japan)
- Producer: Lord Tim
