= Tim Yatras =

Australian musician

- Also known as: Sorrow, Germ
- Born: July 5, 1984 (age 42)
- Origin: Wollongong, New South Wales, Australia
- Genres: Rock, pop, electronic, black metal
- Instruments: Drums, keyboard, guitar, vocals
- Years active: 2002–present
- Member of: Austere, Germ
- Formerly of: Lord, Dungeon, Nazxul

Timothy James Yatras (Russian: Тимоти Джеймс Ятрас, born 5 July 1984) is an Australian musician, composer and producer, best known as one half of black metal duo Austere, and the creator of the black metal/rock/trance act Germ.

== Biography ==
Yatras was a member of Lord, and prior to that was also a part of Dungeon from February 2005 until their breakup, and appears on the 2006 release, The Final Chapter, performing drums and backing vocals, and co-writing most of the tracks. He is also a session musician on the studio-based Newcastle band Ilium's albums, Vespertilion, and Ageless Decay. He toured as a member of Nazxul in 2004, and later performed Drums and Keyboards on the band's album, Iconoclast, in 2008. Tim also featured in a string of bands including Battalion, with whom he recorded the CD Into Harm's Way. Yatras also performed drums and backing vocals on Simon Polhill's debut EP, Serial.

Yatras played drums and keyboards and sang backing vocals on the Lord albums Ascendence and Set in Stone and receives a writing credit for every song except the intros, and is credited with the lyrics to the track "Same Old Lines". After completing work on the Set in Stone album, Yatras left Lord following a national tour in June, 2009.

Along with childhood friend Desolate of the doom metal act Funeral Mourning, Yatras was one half of the black metal band Austere, performing vocals, drums, keyboards and some guitars. Since the dissolution of Austere, Tim played drums, sang all of the vocals, and also structured and arranged much of the music on the Woods of Desolation album Torn Beyond Reason, as well as being a member of the rock band Grey Waters (which disestablished in February 2012). He also worked composing songs for several J-pop and K-pop labels and producers.

Currently, Yatras is recording and producing bands, composing music for others, and working in audio engineering and post production.

Yatras had a guest vocal spot on the album No Morrow Shall Dawn by the black metal project Thy Light. The album was released July 20, 2013.

On the Blackened Angel collaboration Chronicles of Damnation, Yatras played drums.

== Influences ==
As his composing influences, Yatras lists Yoshiki, Noel Gallagher, Gorecki, Jean Michel Jarre, Tetsuya Komuro, and Klaus Schulze among others.

== Personal life ==
Yatras currently lives in Barnaul, Russia.

== Discography ==
=== Lord ===
- Ascendence (2007) (Drums, Backing Vocals)
- "Hear No Evil" (2008) (Drums, Backing Vocals)
- Set in Stone (2009) (Drums, Keyboards, Backing Vocals)

=== Dungeon ===
- The Final Chapter (2006) (Drums, Backing Vocals)

=== Ilium ===
- Vespertilion (2008) (Session Drums)
- Ageless Decay (2009) (Session Drums)

=== Nazxul ===
- Iconoclast (2009) (Drums, Additional Keyboards, Additional Vocals)

=== Austere ===
- Withering Illusions and Desolation (2007) (Drums, Vocals)
- Only the Wind Remembers (2008) (Drums, Vocals)
- Bleak (2008) (Drums, Vocals, Keyboards, Guitar)
- To Lay Like Old Ashes (2009) (Drums, Vocals, Keyboards, Guitar)
- Corrosion of Hearts (2023) (Drums, Vocals, Keyboards)
- Beneath the Threshold (2024) (Drums, Vocals, Keyboards)
- The Stillness of Dissolution (2025) (Drums, Vocals, Keyboards)

=== Autumn's Dawn ===
- Autumn's Dawn (2014) (Vocals, Drums, Guitar)
- Gone (2014) (Vocals, Drums, Guitar)
- Smoke Screen Horizon (2017) (Vocals, Drums)
- Dying Ember (2020) (Vocals, Drums, Keyboards)
- We Lost Our Hope Along the Way (2025) (Vocals, Drums, Keyboards)

=== Battalion ===
- Into Harm's Way (2004) (Drums)

=== Simon Polhill ===
- "Serial" (2007) (Session Drums, Backing Vocals)

=== Woods of Desolation ===
- Torn Beyond Reason (2011) (Vocals, Drums)

=== Grey Waters ===
- Below the Ever Setting Sun (2010) (Vocals, Drums, Keyboards, Orchestration, Programming)

=== Germ ===
- Wish (2012) (Vocals, Guitars, Bass, Drums, Keyboards, Piano, Orchestration, Programming)
- Loss (EP 2012) (Vocals, Guitars, Bass, Drums, Keyboards, Piano, Orchestration, Programming)
- Grief (2013) (Vocals, Guitars, Bass, Drums, Keyboards, Piano, Orchestration, Programming)
- Escape (2016) (Vocals, Guitars, Bass, Drums, Keyboards, Piano, Orchestration, Programming)

=== Blackened Angel ===
- Chronicles of Damnation (2013) (Drums)

=== Skyforest ===
- Aftermath (2014) (Lead vocals, Drums, Lyrics)

=== Coldawn ===
- In The Dawn... (2018) (Session Drums, Backing Vocals)

=== Vixenta ===
- Polarity (2021) (Session Drums)
- Vixenta//Elcrost (2021) (Session Drums, Additional Keyboards, Mixing)
- DAWN STAR (2023) (Session Drums)
- THE OUBLIETTE (2024) (Session Drums)
