= Vanishing Point (band) =

Australian progressive metal band

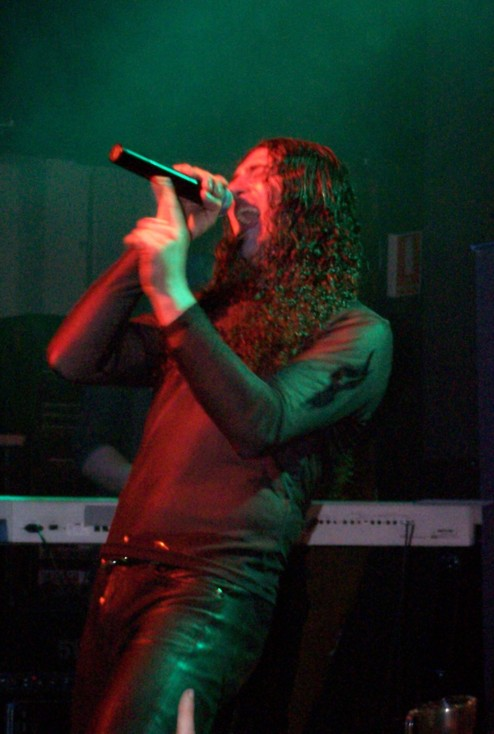
- Silvio Massaro performing live in Sydney, 2005

Background information
- Origin: Melbourne, Victoria, Australia
- Genre: Progressive metal
- Years active: 1995–present
- Labels: A.F.M Records, Limb Music
- Members: Silvio Massaro; Chris Porcianko; Ande Falko; Damien Hall; Gaston Chin
- Past members: Joe Del Mastro; Tommy Vucur; Leonard Kopilas; Jack Lukic; Danny Olding; Pep Sammartino; Andrew Whitehead; Adrian Alimic; Jake Lowe; Luke Beltramello; Christian Nativo; James Maier
- Website: www.vanishing-point.com.au

Vanishing Point is a progressive metal band based in Melbourne, Australia founded in the early 1990s with Silvio Massaro as the longest serving member. Vanishing Point have a resurgence and have embarked on a campaign to put themselves back in the eyes of the heavy metal world. In the year 2020 Vanishing Point return as a five-piece, with the introduction of drummer Damien Hall and bassist Gaston Chin, and in 2025 there has been a shift in one of the band members with a new member, lead guitarist Ande Falko.

== History ==
=== Early years and In Thought (1995–1999) ===
Vanishing Point was established in the early 1990s, featuring guitarist Tommy Vucur, drummer Jack Lukic, and bassist Joe Del Mastro, who had previously played in a band named EYE. In the mid-1990s, vocalist Silvio Massaro and keyboardist Pep Sammartino joined the ensemble, leading to a name change from EYE to Vanishing point.

Shortly thereafter, Andrew Whitehead was added as a second guitarist. The band recorded their debut album, In Thought, in 1996, which was released in Europe by the German label Angular Records in 1997. The following year, it was re-released in Australia by the Melbourne label Metal Warriors, including a bonus track titled Inner Peace, featuring new guitarist Chris Porcianko, who succeeded Andrew Whitehead.

=== Tangled in Dream (1999–2004) ===
In 1999, the band had the opportunity to support Yngwie Malmsteen, after which Pep Sammartino left the group amicably to explore other pursuits, leading to Danny Olding stepping in as his replacement. Shortly thereafter, Vanishing Point travelled to Germany to perform at the 2000 Wacken Open Air festival. Later that year, their second album, Tangled in Dream, was released in Australia by Metal Warriors and internationally by the German label LMP. The subsequent eighteen months proved to be a particularly active time for the band.

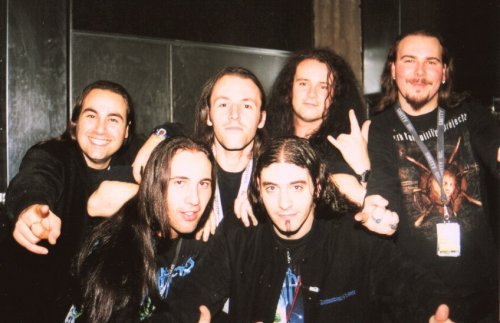
Vanishing Point European tour at Helsinki Finland (2001)

In late 2001, Vanishing Point embarked on a European tour alongside Gamma Ray and Sonata Arctica, during which Olding contributed live keyboard performances for Gamma Ray. Upon their return to Australia in 2002, they toured the nation with the German band Edguy.

Throughout 2003, Vanishing Point dedicated their efforts to the creation of their next album, culminating in a rare live performance at the esteemed, albeit now-defunct, Metal For The Brain festival in Canberra. During the recording process, Leonard Kopilas from Manic Opera replaced Olding in the band. However, Vanishing Point encountered an involuntary hiatus due to persistent indifference with Metal Warriors, ultimately resulting in the discontinuation of their management relationship with the organisation.

=== Embrace the Silence (2005–2006) ===
In 2005, the band made a return to live performances at the Metal For The Brain event, followed by a concert with Nightwish during the Melbourne segment of their Australian tour. Their new label, Germany's Dockyard 1, released Embrace The Silence internationally in the middle of the year, while the Wollongong-based Riot! label handled its release in Australia. Towards the end of the year, Joe Del Mastro announced his exit from Vanishing Point. After completing a final series of live performances with the band, he was succeeded by Steve Cox, who previously played with the Melbourne Hard Rock band Teargas and the Thrash Metal band Black Like Vengeance.

In 2006, Vanishing Point provided support for Black Label Society and Gamma Ray during the Melbourne portions of their Australian tours. In December, Jack Lukic announced his departure due to family obligations, leading to the appointment of Adrian Alimic on bass also from Manic Opera, while Christian Nativo took over Jack Lukic's role on drums.

=== The Fourth Season (2007–2013) ===
Jake Lowe was brought on board to play live keyboards, and in May 2007, Vanishing Point provided support for DragonForce during their tour in Australia and New Zealand. The band's fourth album, titled The Fourth Season, was released on August 24, 2007, under the Dockyard 1 label. In February 2008, Vanishing Point opened for Iron Maiden, performing one concert in Perth and two in Melbourne. Additionally, they toured with fellow Australian power metal band Black Majesty alongside Helloween in February 2008.

In July 2008, Vanishing Point supported Joe Satriani during his two performances in Melbourne.

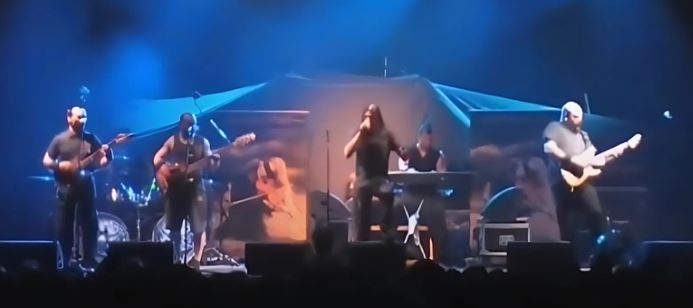
Vanishing Point performing in Barcelona (2008)

By late September 2008, Vanishing Point embarked on another European tour, this time supporting their friends Sonata Arctica along with Norway's Pagan's Mind. The tour proved to be successful, allowing the band to perform in several new countries for the first time. Upon returning to Australia, the band took a brief hiatus before focusing on writing their next album following The Fourth Season.

Regrettably, the songwriting process encountered challenges as some members expressed a desire to explore different musical directions, ultimately resulting in changes to the band's lineup.

In 2010, co-founding member Tommy Vucur departed due to musical disagreements. Adrian Alimic and Jake Lowe also left the band that same year. In 2011, Simon Best joined as the new bassist, followed by Scott Griffith on guitar, and in February, the recording of the fifth album commenced. However, progress was slower than expected due to personal and family losses, leading to Scott Griffith's departure. In May 2012, Vanishing Point welcomed James Maier as the new second guitarist, thereby completing their lineup once more.

=== Distant Is the Sun (2014–2019) ===
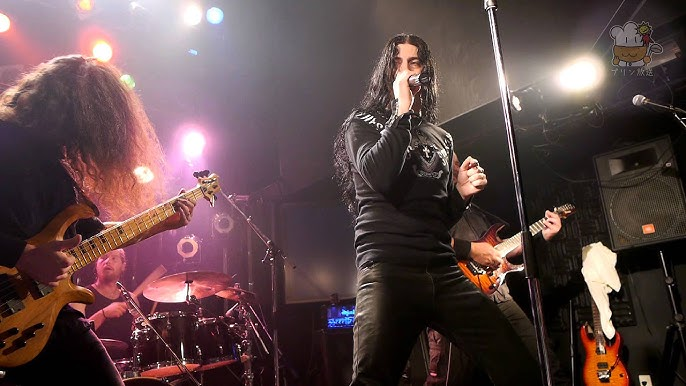
Vanishing Point Japan Tour (Hiroshima - 2014)

In February 2014, the band released their fifth studio album, Distant Is The Sun, through AFM Records. On the same day, the first music video for the album, titled When Truth Lies, was also unveiled. Throughout 2014, Vanishing Point performed in Melbourne and Adelaide, in addition to embarking on a tour in New Zealand. In November of that year, they commenced their inaugural tour of Japan which included stops in Hiroshima, Osaka, Nagoya, Fuji, and Tokyo, with support from Rubicon Records.

Over the years, the band encountered numerous challenges, including another change in lineup between the releases of Dead Elysium and Distant Is The Sun. The latter album serves as a reflection of their experiences and growth, both as a band and as individuals, over the preceding years.

=== Dead Elysium (2020–2025) ===
Vanishing Point experienced a revival and initiated a campaign to re-establish their presence within the heavy metal community. Shortly thereafter, they returned as a five-member band, welcoming drummer Damien Hall and bassist Gaston Chin to their lineup.

The title track, "Dead Elysium", marked the release of their new album on June 19, 2020, followed by a second single titled "Salvus", which is rich in dark ambience and melody, both of which were accompanied by lyric videos. Additionally, a new official music video and single, "Count Your Days", has garnered positive feedback from both long-time fans and newcomers following the album's release after all these years.

=== Eremition (2026–present) ===
Vanishing Point has announced they that have completed their upcoming album Eremition, slated for release on 20 November 2026.

== Band members ==
=== Current ===
- Silvio Massaro – lead vocals (1995–present)
- Chris Porcianko – guitars, backing vocals (1997–present)
- Ande Falko – lead guitars (2025–present)
- Damien Hall – drums (2020–present)
- Gaston Chin – bass (2020–present)

=== Former ===
- Joel Del Mastro – bass (1995–2005)
- Jack Lukic – drums (1995–2006)
- Tom Vucuk – guitars (1995–2010)
- Andrew Whitehead – guitars (1995–1997)
- Pep Sammartino – keyboards (1995–2000)
- Danny Olding – keyboards (2000–2002)
- Leonard Kopilas – keyboards (2002–2008)
- Steve Cox – bass (2005–2006)
- Adrian Alimic – bass (2006–2010, 2015–2020)
- Christian Nativo – drums (2007–2015)
- Jake Lowe – keyboards (2008–2010)
- Simon Best – bass (2010–2015)
- Jordan Trevan – drums (2015–2020)
- James Maier – lead guitars (2012 - 2024)

== Discography ==
Studio albums

- In Thought (1997)
- Tangled in Dream (2000)
- Embrace the Silence (2005)
- The Fourth Season (2007)
- Distant Is the Sun (2014)
- Dead Elysium (2020)
- Eremition (2026)
