= Lord Tim =

Australian musician

Tim Grose

Background information
- Also known as: Lord Tim
- Born: Timothy Ian Grose; 2 April 1970 (age 56)
- Origin: Broken Hill, New South Wales, Australia
- Genres: Heavy metal, power metal
- Occupations: Musician, songwriter, producer
- Instruments: Vocals, guitar, keyboards, bass, keytar, programming
- Years active: 1987–2023
- Website: lord.net.au

Timothy Ian Grose (born 2 April 1970), known professionally as Lord Tim, is an Australian musician and convicted sex offender currently incarcerated. Formerly based in Wollongong, New South Wales, he is best known as the founder of the power metal band Dungeon. The band started in 1989, released several albums, and was considered one of the leading metal bands in Australia. When the band broke up in 2005 after an international tour with Megadeth, Lord Tim continued its legacy with another band he had created, LORD, for which he was singer, guitarist and principal songwriter. On 17 February 2025, the band announced that they had disbanded back in 2023 after becoming aware of a legal matter.

== Biography ==
Born in Broken Hill, New South Wales on 2 April 1970, he started singing along with Duran Duran and Pseudo Echo as a teenager, though considered himself too shy to perform on stage. He purchased a keyboard and taught himself how to play, and started recordings with "two tape recorders connected through a $50 Tandy mic mixer". With his homemade setup, he claims that he wrote and recorded about two hundred songs, all as a learning experience. He got some friends together and they would swap instruments, and he learned that he could play pretty much anything. He adopted his stage name as a joke while working as a DJ at a roller disco. He formed Dungeon in 1989, initially intending to just be the guitarist, since he still didn't want to sing. But when they couldn't find a singer, he stepped up to the microphone, and he eventually found himself enjoying it. After his work on one recording was brought to the attention of BMG he was signed to them under the name Lord Tim and has used it professionally ever since.

Dungeon, regarded by some as Australia's biggest heavy metal band, recorded six studio albums and a live DVD between 1996 and 2006 and completed multiple tours of Australia, Europe and Japan, touring with groups such as Megadeth, Opeth, Nightwish, Angra, and Yngwie Malmsteen. The band ended as a live act in December 2005 with the group's final album recorded during 2006 by Grose and drummer Tim Yatras. In 2003, Grose released the solo album A Personal Journey under the name LORD. After the split of Dungeon, he decided to use the Lord name for his new band, comprising himself, bass player Andrew Dowling, guitarists such as Mark Furtner and Mav Stevens, and drummer Tim Yatras. The "melodic metal" band took on much of the Dungeon legacy, and plays Dungeon's live anthems, classic metal covers, and their own original songs. They have released two more albums and an EP, and toured with groups such as Queensrÿche, Nevermore, Atrocity, Skinless, and Gamma Ray.

Grose was also a member of the Newcastle, Australia power metal band Ilium from 2002 until 2007. He was originally hired to produce the group's debut album Sirens of the Styx but when the vocalist left the band, Grose was asked to also provide vocals. He recorded two albums with them, Permian Dusk, which was released in 2005 and Vespertilion, released in 2007, but announced his departure from the band that November. Grose also contributed lead guitars and vocals to Sydney thrash metal act Dark Order's 2002 album The Violence Continuum and has featured as a live member of the Sydney heavy rock band King Oath, which later became known as Platinum Brunette. He joined Platinum Brunette as guitarist in May 2008 but left again in July 2009, producing and playing on the band's self-titled album in the meantime. Grose also supplied vocals and bass guitar to demo recordings by Adelaide thrash band Fury featuring his cousin Ricky Boon who is blind due to a degenerative disease called retinitis pigmentosa, and played guitar for the techno project Edrenalin.

Most recognised for his singing and guitar-playing, he also plays bass guitar and keyboards and has worked as a producer and web developer. He has also set up a recording studio in his home in Wollongong, New South Wales.

== Influences ==
Grose continues to listen to pop music such as that by Duran Duran and Pseudo Echo, blues by Gary Moore, and John Williams film scores. He lists influences on his guitar playing as George Lynch, Paul Gilbert, Gary Moore and Tony MacAlpine. Vocally, he cites Geoff Tate, John Farnham, Bruce Dickinson and Michael Kiske as major inspirations.

== Discography ==
=== Lord ===
see Lord Discography

=== Dungeon ===
see Dungeon Discography

=== Platinum Brunette ===
- Platinum Brunette (2009) (guitars, backing vocals)

=== Grey Waters ===
- Below the Ever Setting Sun (2010) (additional keyboards and orchestration)

=== Empires of Eden ===
- Songs of War And Vengeance (2009) (guest guitar solo)

=== Austere ===
- To Lay Like Old Ashes (2009) (additional keyboards)

=== Kosmic Kickstartz ===
- The Oz Dream (single) (2009) (vocals, guitars, bass, keyboards and orchestration)

=== Argument Soul ===
- Conflict of Crisis (2009) (guest backing vocals)

=== Ilium ===
- Vespertilion (2007) (vocals)
- Permian Dusk (2005) (vocals)

=== Simon Polhill ===
- Serial (2007) (guest guitar solo)

=== Dark Order ===
- The Violence Continuum (2002) (guest guitars and vocals)

=== Fury ===
- Demo (1997) (guest backing vocals)

=== Edrenalin ===
- Carpe Diem (1992) (guitars, writing credits)
