= Music of Canberra =

Canberra is home to a number of important musical venues and institutions, including the Llewellyn Hall performance venue - a part of the Australian National University School of Music, and a number of music festivals including Canberra International Music Festival, Canberra Country Blues & Roots Festival and the National Folk Festival. The local music scene includes many bars and nightclubs for local performers, mostly clustered in Dickson, Kingston and the City Centre. The most notable musicians from the Canberra scene include Safia, guinness stone, Genesis Owusu, Hands like Houses, Peking Duk, Teen Jesus and the Jean Teasers, and Citizen Kay.

== Popular music ==
Jack Lumsdaine wrote and recorded the songs Canberra's Calling to You and Queanbeyan in 1938, the sesquicentenary of European settlement.

Promoters and record labels in Canberra include Capital City, Dream Damage, Hardrush Music, Hellosquare Recordings, KP Records (Distributed internationally by WIDEawake Entertainment), Bad Sounds, Canberra Musicians Club, Canberra Music Workshop, Metaphysical Productions (Hip Hop), Vacant Room Records and Birds Love Fighting Records.

== Venues ==
Venues for music in Canberra that are bars, clubs, community organisations or businesses that hold music based events including halls and other spaces that are available for hire.

- The Abbey
- Ainslie Main Hall
- Albert Hall
- ANCA Gallery
- ANU Bar (Lic/AA & 18+)
- ANU School of Music Big Band Room
- Australian National Botanic Gardens Theatrette
- Balcony Room Tuggeranong
- The Basement (18+ & U18)
- Belconnen Arts Centre
- Belconnen Youth Centre
- A Bite to Eat
- Burbidge Outdoor Amphitheatre
- Burns Club, Kambah
- Canberra Theatre Centre (Lic/AA)
- Charnwood Scout Hall
- Civic Youth Centre (AA)
- Corroboree Park Function Room
- Crosbie Morrison Amphitheatre
- Deakin Scout Hall
- Deakin Soccer Club
- Downer Community Hall
- Eucalypt Lawns
- Evatt Scout Hall
- The Eye at Canberra Business Events Centre
- Floresco in the Gardens Cafe
- The Folkus (Lic/AA)
- The Front Gallery & Cafe
- Garran Scout Hall
- The George Harcourt Inn (18+)
- Gordon Darling Hall
- Goolabri
- The Great Hall
- Griffin Centre Hall
- Griffith Hall
- Gungaderra Homestead Hall
- Harmonie German Club
- Hippo
- Kendall Lane Theatre
- Kings Hall
- King O'Malleys
- Lake Ginninderra Sea Scout Hall
- KnightsBridge Penthouse
- Lake View Ballroom
- Larry Sitsky Recital Room
- Llewellyn Hall
- Macarthur Scout Hall
- Majura Community Centre Function Room
- Majura Hall
- The Marble Foyer
- Members Dining Room at Old Parliament House
- The Merry Muse (18+)
- Narrabundah Hall
- National Carillon
- National Library Foyer
- National Library Theatre
- New Acton Courtyard Stage and Cinema
- Northside Community Service
- Oaks Estate Community Centre
- The Old Canberra Inn (18+)
- Piano Bar
- PJ O'Reilly's Civic (18+)
- PJ O'Reilly's Tuggeranong (18+)
- Polish White Eagle Club
- The Pot Belly (18+)
- Reflections Room Tuggeranong
- Richardson Scout Hall
- Rose Cottage Canberra
- Royal Theatre Canberra Convention Centre
- Shadows (18+)
- Sideway (18+)
- Smiths Alternative
- Street Theatre 1
- Street Theatre 2
- Theatre 3
- Tilley's
- Transit Bar (18+)
- Tuggeranong Cabaret Space
- Tuggeranong Theatre
- Tuggeranong Youth Centre
- UC Refectory
- Waramanga/Fisher Scout Hall
- The Warehouse (AA)
- Wesley Music Centre
- Weston Creek Community Centre
- Westside Acton Park
- Witness Protection Studios
- Woden Youth Centre (AA)
- Yarralumla Scout Hall

== Other venues ==
Halls and outdoor areas where events are usually arranged by an entity other than the venue owner or caretaker.

== Art music ==
Canberra hosts the Canberra Symphony Orchestra, which regularly performs at Llewellyn Hall at the ANU School of Music. Llewellyn Hall also features subscription series from touring groups such as the Australian Chamber Orchestra and Musica Viva Australia.

The Royal Military College Band is based at Duntroon. Other groups that present classical and jazz concerts in Canberra include the ANU School of Music, Art Song Canberra, Brew Guitar Duo, Canberra International Music Festival, Canberra City Band, The Canberra Jazz Club, The Gods Cafe, The Griffyn Ensemble, Guitar Trek, Salut Baroque!, Seven Harp Ensemble, Stopera, Australia|Stopera, and Wesley Music Centre.

Canberra is also home to a number of community and youth ensembles and organisations including Music For Canberra (resultant of a merge in 2015 between Key Arts Organisations Music For Everyone & Canberra Youth Music, funded by ArtsACT), the Canberra Choral Society, Canberra Chamber Orchestra, Musica da Camera, and the National Capital Orchestra.

== Musical artists ==
Some of Canberra's notable local artists include:

- 78 Saab
- Alchemist
- ARCHIE
- Armoured Angel
- Artificial
- The Aston Shuffle
- The Bedridden
- Biblemami
- B(if)tek
- Big Dave
- Blue Sarah Tonin
- Cellblock 69
- Citizen Kay
- Coda Conduct
- Dark Network
- Doug Anthony Allstars
- Dressed For A Funeral
- The Ellis Collective
- Faceless (Fvceless)
- Franklyn B Paverty
- Genesis Owusu
- Gia Ransome
- Groovy Daughter
- guinness stone
- Hands Like Houses
- Hydranaut
- The Idea of North
- Industrie
- Koolism
- Moaning Lisa
- NORA
- Omar Musa
- Peking Duk
- Pod People
- Rubycon
- SAFIA
- Sertra
- Sidewinder
- Something Like This
- Sputnik Sweetheart
- St.Sinner
- Tactics
- Taka Perry
- Teen Jesus and the Jean Teasers
- Transit Dolls
- The Way Hip Antelopes

== Music festivals ==
- Canberra International Music Festival
- Corinbank Festival (years active: 2008–2010, 2012)
- Metal for the Brain (years active: 1991–2006)
- National Folk Festival
- Spilt Milk
- Stonefest (years active: 2001–2010)
- You Are Here festival
