= Eve of the War =

EP by Alchemist
- Released: 1998/1999
- Recorded: June, August 1998
- Studio: the Gypsy Bar, Canberra; Backbeach Studios, Rye, Victoria
- Genre: Progressive metal; avant-garde metal; death metal
- Length: 37:22
- Label: Thrust/Shock
- Producer: D. W. Norton; Martin Shepherd; Simon

Alchemist chronology
Spiritech (1997)	Eve of the War (1998)	Organasm (1999)

Eve of the War is a six-track extended play from the Australian progressive metal band Alchemist. The EP was released by Shock Records through its subsidiary label Thrust in 1998/1999. The title track, "Eve of the War" is a cover version of the opening piece from the British 1978 album, Jeff Wayne's Musical Version of The War of the Worlds. The EP has two live songs: "Yoni Kunda" first released on Lunasphere (May 1995), and "Chinese Whispers" from Spiritech (June 1997). The other tracks are a remix of "Yoni Kunda", and two re-mastered tracks from Jar of Kingdom (October 1993). A music video of the title track was provided.

The EP is now deleted, "Eve of the War" and the live version of "Chinese Whispers" were later included on their compilation album, Embryonics (November 2005).

== Usage in media ==
The song "Eve of the war" instrumentals were used in an EE advert in the UK.

== Track listing ==
All tracks are written by Rodney Holder, Adam Agius, John Bray and Roy Torkington, unless otherwise shown

No.	Title	Length
1.	"Eve of the War" (Jeff Wayne)	5:16
2.	"Yoni Kunda" (live)	5:32
3.	"Chinese Whispers" (live)	9:30
4.	"Koni Yunda"	3:58
5.	"Brumal: a View from Pluto"	5:46
6.	"Worlds Within Worlds"	7:20

== Personnel ==
Alchemist

- Adam Agius – vocals, guitar, keyboards
- John Bray – bass guitar
- Rodney Holder – drums
- Roy Torkington – guitar

Other musicians

- Josh Nixon – guitar (on track 1)
- Mark Rochelle – keyboards

Recording details

- Audio engineer – D. W. Norton at Backbeach Studios, Rye, Victoria, June, August 1998
- Producer – D. W. Norton, Martin Shepherd (tracks 2–3), Simon (tracks 2–3) at the Disco Playpen
- Mixing engineer – Martin Shepherd (track 4)
- Audio engineer – Chock (tracks 2–3) at the Gypsy Bar
- Tracks 5 and 6 re-mastered from Jar of Kingdom

Artwork details

- Roy Torkington – artwork, layout, design
- Simon – layout, design
