= Embryonics =

Compilation album by Alchemist
- Released: November 2005
- Genre: Progressive metal Avant-garde metal Death metal
- Length: 149:18
- Label: Relapse; Chatterbox
- Producer: D.W. Norton

Alchemist chronology
Austral Alien (2003)	Embryonics (2005)	Tripsis (2007)

Professional ratings
Review scores
Source	Rating
Allmusic	4.5/5 stars

Embryonics is a double-CD compilation of tracks by the Australian progressive metal band Alchemist. It was released in 2005 in Australia by Chatterbox Records and worldwide by Relapse Records. The album features 28 tracks recorded by the band between 1990 and 1998 including eight songs from the album Jar of Kingdom, eight from Lunasphere and five from Spiritech along with a cover of "Eve of the War" from Jeff Wayne's Musical Version of The War of the Worlds that was the title track from EP Eve of the War that is now deleted. The live version of "Chinese Whispers" is also from that EP; the other live tracks were recorded in 1995 at the studios of Triple J for an episode of Three Hours of Power and are exclusive to this release. "Paisley Bieurr" and "Imagination Flower" are early demo tracks.

== Track listing ==
(all songs written by Alchemist except #1, CD 2 by Jeff Wayne)

=== CD 1 ===
No.	Title	Writer(s)	Length
1.	"Chinese Whispers"	Alchemist	9:37
2.	"Abstraction"	Alchemist	3:37
3.	"Unfocused"	Alchemist	6:21
4.	"Enhancing Enigma"	Alchemist	5:16
5.	"Dancing to Life"	Alchemist	6:03
6.	"Brumal: A View From Pluto"	Alchemist	5:45
7.	"Lunation"	Alchemist	3:47
8.	"Staying Conscious"	Alchemist	5:43
9.	"Shell"	Alchemist	4:03
10.	"Garden of Eroticism"	Alchemist	7:22
11.	"Jar of Kingdom"	Alchemist	6:17
12.	"Paisley Buerr"	Alchemist	3:52
13.	"Yoni Kunda (live)"	Alchemist	5:51
14.	"Closed Chapter (live)"	Alchemist	5:03

=== CD 2 ===
No.	Title	Writer(s)	Length
1.	"Eve of the War"	Jeff Wayne	5:17
2.	"Beyond Genesis"	Alchemist	7:20
3.	"Yoni Kunda"	Alchemist	5:12
4.	"Purple"	Alchemist	3:42
5.	"Imagination Flower"	Alchemist	2:44
6.	"Spiritechnology"	Alchemist	6:34
7.	"Soul Return"	Alchemist	8:18
8.	"Road to Ubar"	Alchemist	5:37
9.	"Found"	Alchemist	1:21
10.	"Clot"	Alchemist	4:36
11.	"Worlds Within Worlds"	Alchemist	7:07
12.	"My Animated Truth"	Alchemist	3:28
13.	"Closed Chapter"	Alchemist	5:04
14.	"Chinese Whispers (live)"	Alchemist	9:29

== Credits ==
=== Band members ===
- Adam Agius − vocals, guitar, keyboards
- Rodney Holder − drums
- John Bray − bass guitar (except #12, disc 1)
- Roy Torkington − guitar (except #12, disc 1 and #5, disc 2), artwork, layout and design
- James Preece − bass (#12, disc 1)
- Andrew Meredith − guitar (#12, disc 1 and #5, disc 2)

=== Guest musicians ===
- Michelle Klemke − vocals (#9, disc 1 and #9, disc 2)
- Josh Nixon − guitar (#1, disc 2)
