= Woodford Folk Festival =

Annual Australian folk music festival held near Woodford, Queensland

Coordinates: 26°54′54.15″S 152°45′19.54″E

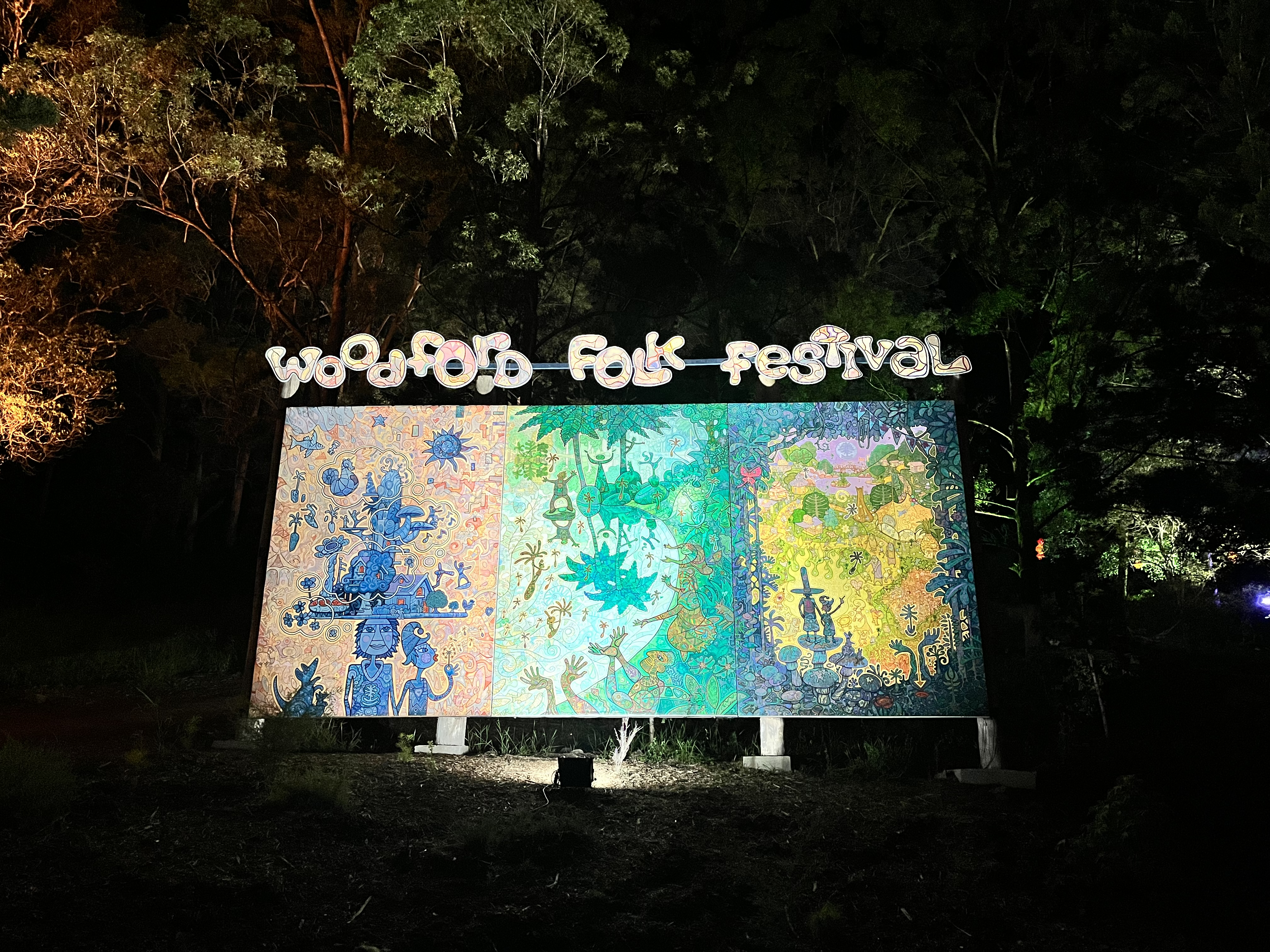
- Woodford Folk Festival 2023-2024, festival sign near main stage
- Genre: Various
- Dates: 27 December – 1 January
- Locations: Woodford, Queensland, Australia
- Years active: 1994–2019, 2022–
- Founders: Queensland Folk Federation, Bill Hauritz, Amanda Jackes
- Organiser: Woodfordia (previously Queensland Folk Federation), Amanda Jackes
- Website: www.woodfordfolkfestival.com

The Woodford Folk Festival is an annual music and cultural festival held near the semi-rural town of Woodford, 72 km (45 mi) north of Brisbane, Queensland, Australia. It is one of the biggest annual cultural events of its type in Australia. Every year approximately 125,000 patrons attend the festival. Approximately 2000 performers and 438 events are programmed featuring local, national and international guests.

== Format ==
The festival takes place over six days and nights from 27 December to 1 January each year. It features a wide range of performance styles, musical genres and nationalities, with artists playing at over 25 different venues within the festival grounds. Along with musical acts, the festival offers a wide spectrum of entertainment such as circus, cabaret, comedy, street performance, workshops, debate, a Children's Festival and more. The streets are lined with restaurants, cafes, stalls, bars, street theatre and parades. The festival supplies both Season and Overnight camping ground to patrons, with most attendees staying for the entire week of festivities.

The 3 Minutes Silence is a recurring Woodford tradition, part of the New Year's Eve celebrations where festival goers within the grounds gather for 3 minutes of candle-lit silence to welcome the new year. A Sunrise Ceremony then takes place on the Woodfordia hilltop on New Year's Day. The whole community greets the Sun as they listen to Tibetan chants and guest musicians on the grassy hill. The final evening of the festival culminates in a spectacular New Year's Day closing ceremony, The Fire Event.

== Location ==
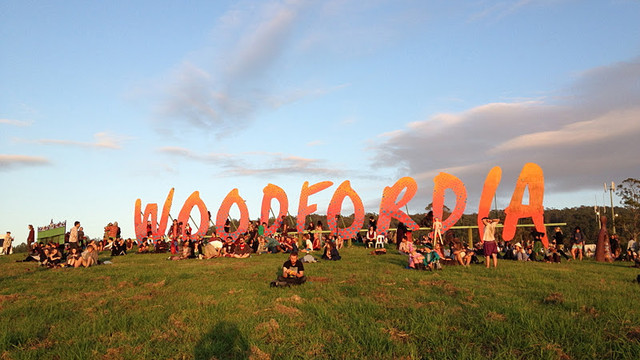
The famous Woodfordia sign built upon the hilltop

Unlike many festivals which are held in or near urban centres, the Woodford Folk Festival takes place on a 500-acre rural property known as Woodfordia, situated approximately 7 km (4.3 mi) north of the Sunshine Coast town of Woodford. The land is owned by Woodfordia Inc (previously Queensland Folk Federation), who are the producers of the festival.

The 2011 flooding throughout Queensland also affected Woodfordia, leaving the Queensland Folk Federation (QFF) with millions of dollars of repair bills. To save the organisation, the Moreton Bay Regional Council (MBRC) purchased the land from the QFF and then leased it back to them for 50 years. The MBRC owns the land, however the QFF still owns all infrastructure and improvements made to the land.

== History ==
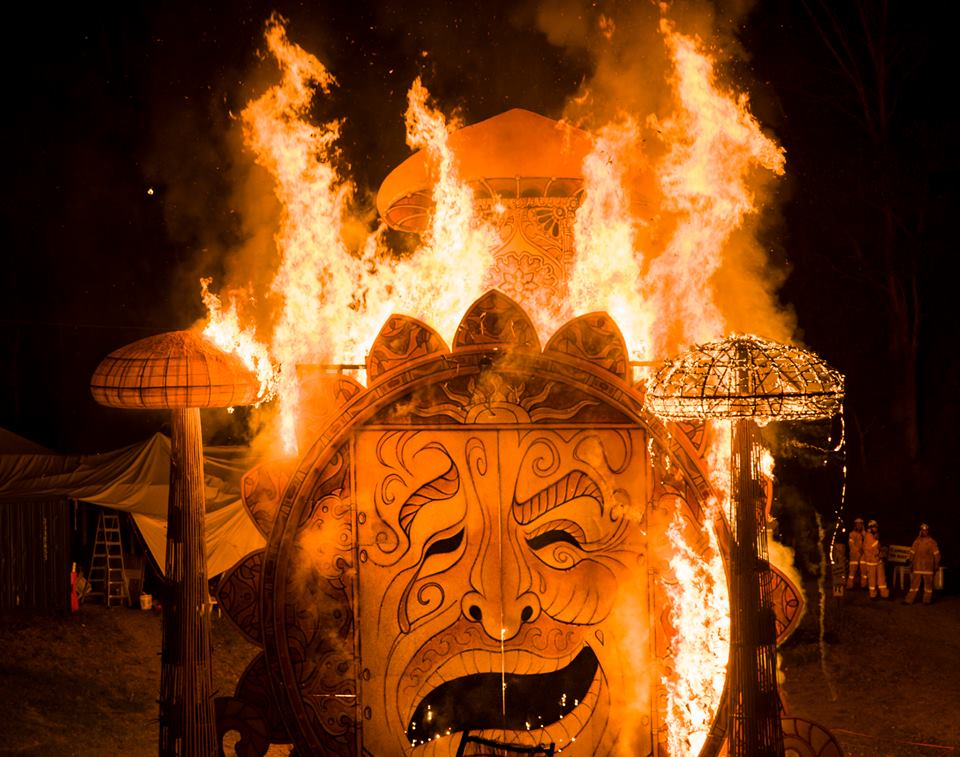
The Fire Event, every year a symbolic structure is ceremoniously set alight.

The Woodford Folk Festival developed from the Maleny Folk Festival which began in Maleny in 1987. In 1994, the festival was moved 20 km (12 mi) away to Woodford when it outgrew the Maleny Showgrounds site.

The final evening of the Woodford festival culminates in a spectacular New Year's Day closing ceremony, The Fire Event. Over 20,000 festival goers seated on the grassed Amphitheater hillside witness a spectacle of dance, music, theatricality and fire - with the burning of a large structure heralding the New Year. The Fire Event was developed by Neil Cameron at the former Maleny festival and continued at Woodford, Paul Lawler worked with Cameron and took over as creative director of the event from 2003 to 2011, followed by Joey Ruigrok Van De Werven from 2012 to 2014, and Alex Podger from 2014 to 2022. The January 2000 Fire Event was featured in the global live TV broadcast heralding the new millennium.

In 2005–2006 a record aggregate attendance of over 130,000 visitors attended the festival, injecting $21 million into the Queensland economy.

In 2008, the festival won the FasterLouder Festival Award for the most Green Friendly festival.

In 2009 as part of the Q150 celebrations, the Woodford Folk Festival was announced as one of the Q150 Icons of Queensland for its role as an "event and festival".

In 2014, the festival attracted more than 126,000 patrons and generated 22 million dollars in direct visitor spending.

The Festival celebrated its 30th anniversary in 2015, transforming from a homegrown event to one of the largest cultural celebrations in the southern hemisphere and welcoming more than 2 million people since 1994.

In 2016–17, the festival attracted over 135,000 patrons, which was its largest year to date.

The COVID-19 pandemic caused the 2020 festival to go on hiatus. After a two year hiatus, the 2022 Woodford Folk Festival programme was announced on 22 October 2022 featuring a score of Australian and international artists returning to the Woodfordia parklands.

== Awards and nominations ==
=== National Live Music Awards ===
The National Live Music Awards (NLMAs) are a broad recognition of Australia's diverse live industry, celebrating the success of the Australian live scene. The awards commenced in 2016.

Year	Nominee / work	Award	Result
National Live Music Awards of 2019	Woodford Folk Festival	Best Live Music Festival or Event	Nominated
National Live Music Awards of 2020	Woodford Folk Festival	Best Live Music Festival or Event	Won

== Past Performers ==
2004–2005

- Missy Higgins, The Cat Empire, Doch, Xavier Rudd, The Beautiful Girls, The Waifs, Bomba, Kate Miller-Heidke, The Boat People, Rebecca Wright, Resin Dogs, Butterfingers, Afro Dizzi Act, Jeff Lang Band, Hot Rubber Glove, Pty Ltd, Kooii, Ash Grunwald, and Kafka.

2005–2006

- The Cat Empire, Pete Murray, Kate Miller-Heidke, Doch, Bomba, Jodi Martin, Wild Marmalade, Tribalicious, Tommee and the Neighbourhood, That 1 Guy, Sophie Koh, Circle of Rhythm, Rob Longstaff Band, Mia Dyson, LABJACD, Kafka, Jambezi, Genticorum, Blue King Brown, Afro Dizzi Act, and Ash Grunwald.

2006–2007

- The John Butler Trio, Xavier Rudd, Youth Group, Lior, Angus and Julia Stone, The Herd, The Beautiful Girls, Blue King Brown, Resin Dogs, Tim Freedman, Jeff Lang, The Bird, The Audreys, Ash Grunwald, Kate Miller-Heidke, Jodi Martin, LABJACD, Kooii, Kafka, Leo, That 1 Guy, Hamell on Trial, Waiting For Guinness Umbilical Brothers, The Black Market Rhythm Co. and Tripod.
- Bobby Flynn also made an uncredited and unexpected appearance and performed.
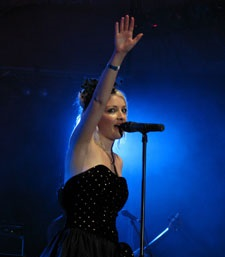
  Kate Miller-Heidke at the 2008–09 festival. Miller has headlined Woodford over six times since the festival began.

2007–2008

- Backsliders, The Cat Empire, Angus and Julia Stone, Babylon Circus, The Waifs, Sarah Blasko, Jackson Jackson, Blue King Brown, Archie Roach, Lola the Vamp, James Morrison, Mia Dyson, Tinpan Orange, The Toothfaeries, Blue Grassy Knoll, Ernie Dingo, Dick Desert, Mojo Webb & Band, Women in Docs, The NEO, Worldfly, The Black Market Rhythm Co., The Quills, Noriko Tadano.

2008–2009

- Backsliders, Josh Pyke, The Herd, Hermitude, Kate Miller-Heidke, The Gin Club, Bob Evans, The Ellis Collective, Ash Grunwald, Augie March, Dead Letter Circus, Jeff Lang, Waiting For Guinness, Lior.

2009–2010

- John Butler Trio, The Middle East, Lisa Mitchell, James Morrison, The Panics, Kaki King, Deep Blue Orchestra, Lola The Vamp, Afro Dizzi Act, Chocolate Strings, Hungry Kids of Hungary, Clare Bowditch, Emma Dean, Whitley, Tinpan Orange, Tripod, Dubmarine, Endorphin, Noriko Tadano.

2010–2011

- The Cat Empire , Arrested Development, Kate Miller-Heidke, Katie Noonan and The Captains, Blue King Brown, Archie Roach(Archie Roach could not perform due to medical issues, a tribute show was held and other performers at the festival played his songs), Lola The Vamp, Dick Desert, Jeff Lang, Lior, You Am I, Edge of Colour (Michelle Xen) and Siobhan Owen

2011–2012

- Gotye, Xavier Rudd, Cloud Control, The Herd, Owl Eyes, Jesca Hoop, Andy Bull, Tripod, Skipping Girl Vinegar, Mountain Mocha Kilimanjaro, Busby Marou, Husky, Eagle and The Worm, Tinpan Orange, Die Roten Punkte, Lola The Vamp, The Medics, Hanggai, Joe Robinson, The Red Eyes, Matt Andersen, Elixir (featuring Katie Noonan), Brothers Grim and Siobhan Owen
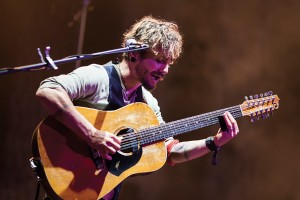
  John Butler of the John Butler Trio at the 2012/13 festival

2012–2013

- John Butler Trio, Angus Stone, Julia Stone, Kate Miller-Heidke, Katchafire, Darren Percival and Band, Archie Roach, Sharon Jones & The Dap-Kings, Hermitude, Will & The People, Sticky Fingers, Urthboy, Warsaw Village Band, Nicky Bomba's Bustamento, Emma Louise, The Saints, Angry Tradesmen, Shaun Kirk, George Kamikawa & Noriko Tadano, Tenzin Choegyal

2013–2014

- Matt Corby, Babylon Circus, Julian Marley, Beth Orton, Clare Bowditch, Peatbog Faeries, Rachel Sermanni, Blue King Brown, Chance Waters, Breabach, Tim Finn, Half Moon Run, The Break, Dubmarine, Kingfisha, The Twoks, Bearded Gypsy Band, Barleyshakes, Bubsy Marou
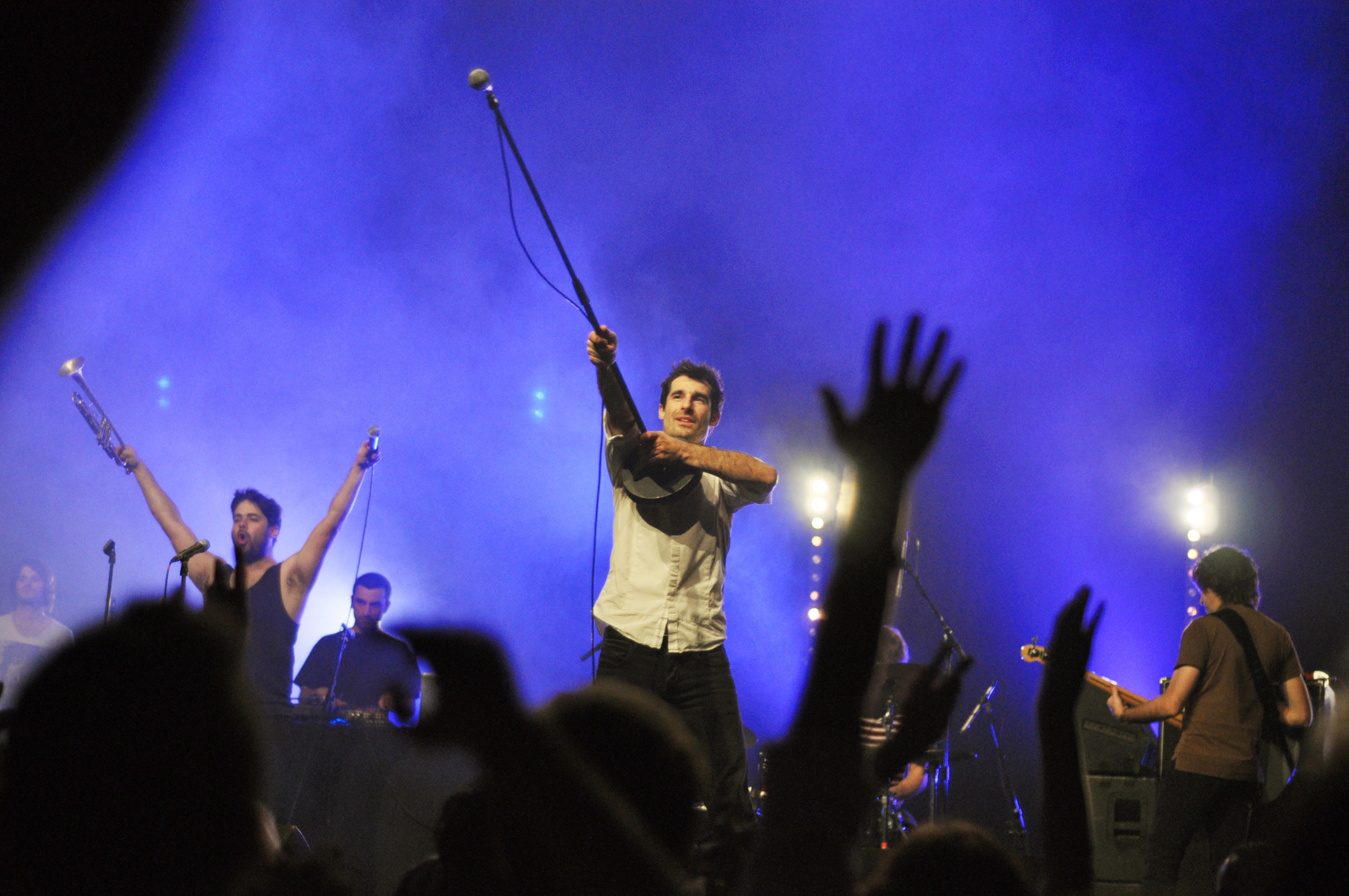
  The Cat Empire performing at the 2014/15 festival

2014–2015

- The Cat Empire, Violent Femmes, Nahko and Medicine for the People, Kate Miller-Heidke, Bertie Blackman, Sticky Fingers, Archie Roach, Jeff Lang, Christine Anu, Del Barber, Shooglenifty, Hiatus Kaiyote, Mia Dyson, Caravana Sun, We Two Thieves, The East Pointers, Starboard Cannons, Flap!
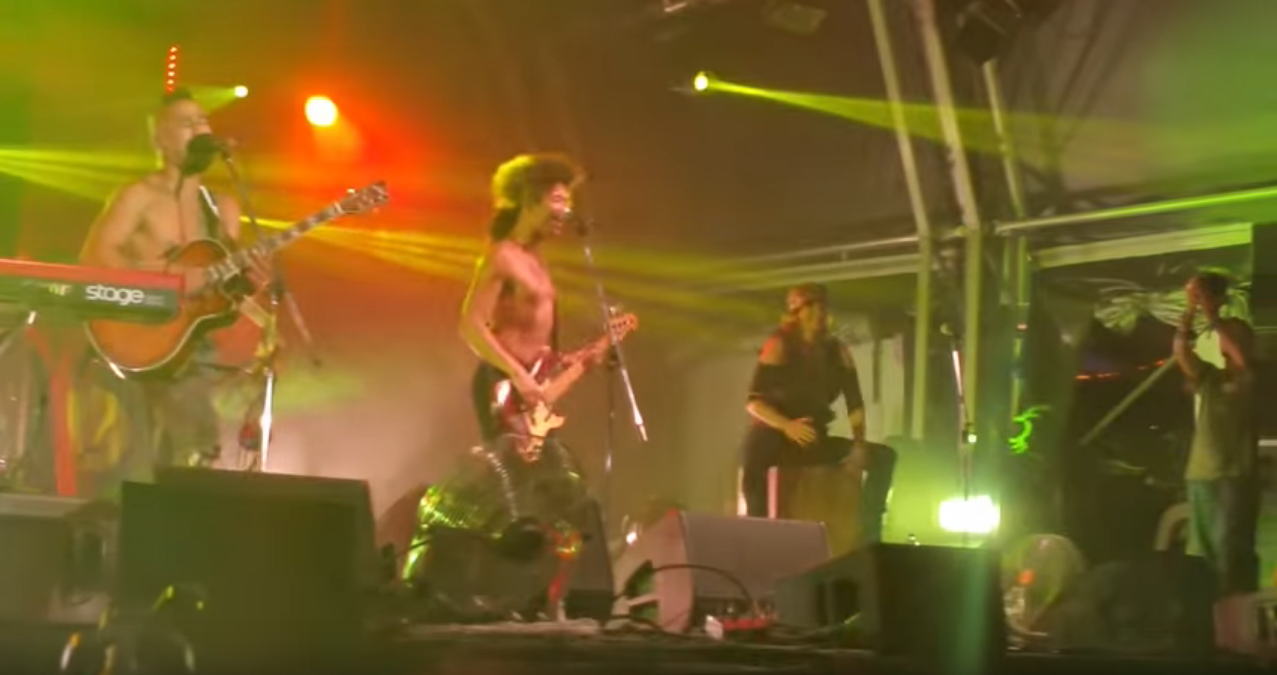
  Nahko and Medicine for the People making their first Woodford appearance at the 2014/15 festival

2015–2016

- Michael Franti, San Cisco, The Paper Kites, Kim Churchill, The East Pointers, Courtney Barnett, Josh Pyke, Katie Noonan, Davidson Brothers, Backsliders, Lanie Lane, Astronomy Class, Dougie MacLean, The Poozies, The Duhks, Ganga Giri, Dubmarine, Starboard Cannons, Barleyshakes

2016–2017

- Buffy Sainte-Marie, Paul Kelly with Charlie Owen, Half Moon Run, Gang of Youths, Tash Sultana, Amanda Palmer, Wallis Bird, The Bamboos, Urthboy, Meow Meow, Lake Street Dive, Thelma Plum, Methyl Ethel, The Little Stevies, Keith Potger, Swamp Thing, Tim O'Brien, Chad Morgan, Sharon Shannon

2017–2018

- John Butler, Kate Miller-Heidke, Husky, Montaigne, Holy Holy, The Beautiful Girls, Timberwolf, Vaudeville Smash, Mama Kin Spender, The East Pointers, Robbie Miller, Sampa the Great, Tinpan Orange, Martin Hayes, Baker Boy, Dennis Cahill, Breaking Trad, Eleanor McEvoy, Cheap Fakes, The Northern Folk, Tenzin Choegyal

2018–2019

- The Cat Empire, The Waifs, Xavier Rudd, Dan Sultan, Kimbra, Julia Jacklin, Stella Donnelly, The Teskey Brothers, Emily Wurramara, Alex the Astronaut, Remi, Electric Fields, Screamfeeder, Irish Mythen, Jen Cloher, Mel Parsons, Deja Voodoo, Paul McDermott & Steven Gates, Ziggy McNeil, Butterfingers

== Controversies ==
In 2011, organisers of the festival were criticised for inviting known conspiracy theorist Meryl Dorey, president of anti-vaccination pressure group the Australian Vaccination Network to speak at the festival. The Australian Medical Association (AMA) described the group's views as "dangerous", and said organisers "had a responsibility to add speakers who could provide the medically approved side of the argument" so the audience were aware of "the risk of the information being presented [by Ms Dorey]". In response, festival director Bill Hauritz defended Dorey's appearance, saying "We've had a number of speakers, environmentalists and such, who have been discredited by some people in the past, this is no different." Queensland Health Minister Geoff Wilson advised attendees "not to take [Meryl's] nonsense too seriously".

== See also ==
- List of festivals in Australia
