= Organasm =

Studio album by Alchemist
- Released: 6 March 2000
- Recorded: 1999 at Back Beach Studios, Rye, Victoria, Australia
- Genres: Progressive metal Avant-garde metal Death metal
- Length: 48:38
- Labels: Chatterbox (Australia); Displeased (Europe); Relapse (U.S.)
- Producer: D.W. Norton

Alchemist chronology
| Eve of the War (1999) | Organasm (2000) | Austral Alien (2003) |

Organasm is the fourth full-length studio album by the Australian progressive metal band Alchemist. It was issued in Australia by Chatterbox, with D.W. Norton producing, on 6 March 2000 as their first release with the label. It was supported by a three-month Australian tour alongside the bands, Cryogenic and Psi.Kore. Organasm featured generally shorter songs than the previous Alchemist albums, but was still rated highly by critics.

Dutch label Displeased released the album in Europe in 2000 and Relapse handled the American release. Tracks 2 to 4 are each listed as part of the "Evolution Trilogy", which comprises a musical movement. A demo version of the lead track, "Austral Spectrum", had appeared on a 1999 compilation album.

== Reception ==
Professional ratings
Review scores
| Source | Rating |
|---|---|
| Allmusic | link |

Eduardo Rivadavia of AllMusic wrote that "[the album] is so complex and original that it defies a summary definition, but one might describe it as a psychedelic-prog-soundtrack-death metal album." He describes Adam Agius' vocal style as "akin to Entombed wrestling with Pink Floyd" and suggested the "Evolution" trilogy evoked the spirit of early Rush.

== Track listing ==
| No. | Title | Writer(s) | Length |
|---|---|---|---|
| 1. | "Austral Spectrum" | Alchemist | 5:41 |
| 2. | "Evolution Trilogy": I. "The Bio Approach" (4:58); II. "Rampant Micro Life" (4:31); III. "Warring Tribes – Eventual Demise" (5:14)" | Alchemist | 14:43 |
| 3. | "Single Sided" | Alchemist | 5:23 |
| 4. | "Surreality" | Alchemist | 3:32 |
| 5. | "New Beginning" | Alchemist | 4:59 |
| 6. | "Tide in, Mind Out" | Alchemist | 5:30 |
| 7. | "Eclectic" | Alchemist | 5:22 |
| 8. | "Escape from the Black Hole" | Alchemist | 5:28 |

== Credits ==
- Adam Agius – vocals, rap growling, guitar, keyboards
- Rodney Holder – drums, bongos
- John Bray – bass guitar, keyboards, samples
- Roy Torkington – guitar, artwork, layout and design

== Release history ==
| Country | Release date | Label |
|---|---|---|
| Australia | 6 March 2000 | Chatterbox Records |
| Europe | 2000 | Displeased |
| US | 2001 | Relapse |
