= Austral Alien =

Studio album by Alchemist
- Released: 12 May 2003
- Recorded: January 2003
- Studio: Backbeach Studios, Rye, Victoria, Australia
- Genre: Avant-garde metal, progressive metal, progressive rock
- Length: 44:22
- Label: Chatterbox, Relapse
- Producer: D.W. Norton

Alchemist chronology
Organasm (2000)	Austral Alien (2003)	Embryonics (2005)

Professional ratings
Review scores
Source	Rating
Allmusic	3.5/5 stars
Metal Storm	10/10

Austral Alien is the fifth full-length studio album by the Australian progressive metal band Alchemist. It was recorded and mixed in only ten days. It was released in 2003 by Chatterbox Records in Australia and worldwide by Relapse Records. Austral Alien is semi-conceptual with a lyrical focus inspired by the Australian environment and the impact of man on the ecology. Promotional music videos for the songs "First Contact", "Solarburn" and "Alpha Capella Nova Vega" were released, with the video for "Solarburn" expressing the album's concept, using imagery from the 2003 Canberra bushfires. The cover art is influenced by Surrealism. Austral Alien featured more keyboards and a mellowing of their previous death metal guitar sound, with even shorter songs than Organasm. Allmusic suggested that "Austral Alien is for Alchemist what, say, Permanent Waves was to Rush (see the increased use of synthesizers): a work of unquestionable merit and maturity that may nevertheless leave older fans yearning just a little for the excesses – both successful and not – of albums past" and noted that this was the band's most commercially accessible release, while still praising Alchemist for their "inspired brand of sci-fi metal".

== Track listing ==
No.	Title	Writer(s)	Length
1.	"First Contact"	Alchemist	3:08
2.	"The Great Southern Wasteland"	Alchemist	4:13
3.	"Solarburn"	Alchemist	3:51
4.	"Alpha Capella Nova Vega"	Alchemist	4:33
5.	"Older Than the Ancients"	Alchemist	4:42
6.	"Backward Journey"	Alchemist	4:24
7.	"Nature on a Leash"	Alchemist	4:03
8.	"Grief Barrier"	Alchemist	3:34
9.	"Epsilon"	Alchemist	3:55
10.	"Speed of Life"	Alchemist	4:07
11.	"Letter to the Future"	Alchemist	5:52

== Credits ==
- Adam Agius − vocals, guitar, keyboards
- Rodney Holder − drums, triangle
- John Bray − bass guitar
- Roy Torkington − guitar, artwork, layout and design
