= Tripsis =

Studio album by Alchemist
- Released: 3 September 2007
- Recorded: 2005–2007 at Backbeach Studios, Rye, Victoria
- Genre: Progressive metal Avant-garde metal Extreme metal
- Length: 42:57
- Label: Chatterbox (Australia); Relapse (U.S.)

Alchemist chronology
Embryonics (2005)	Tripsis (2007)

Professional ratings
Review scores
Source	Rating
AllMusic	3.5/5 stars
Metal Charge	(8.7/10)
Pyromusic.net	(9.6/10)

Tripsis is the sixth and final full-length studio album by the Australian progressive metal band Alchemist. Recorded in 2007, Adam Agius stated that the songwriting focused on a consistently heavy approach. A promotional music video for the song "Wrapped in Guilt" was planned. A music video for "Tongues and Knives" premiered on 8 October 2008.

When asked on the meaning of the album, Agius remarked:

It has many meanings that's for sure. It depends on what dictionary you use, but its basically the action of a mortar and pestle, grinding massaging ingredients together, Its a good analogy of Alchemist music.

— Hail Metal's interview with Adam Agius

== Track listing ==
1. "Wrapped in Guilt" − 4:34
2. "Tongues and Knives" − 5:15
3. "Nothing in No Time" − 5:50
4. "Anticipation of a High" − 4:34
5. "Grasp the Air" − 4:36
6. "CommunicHate" − 4:26
7. "Substance for Shadow" − 4:50
8. "God Shaped Hole" − 5:05
9. "Degenerative Breeding" − 3:47

== Credits ==
- Adam Agius − vocals, guitar, keyboards
- Roy Torkington − guitar, artwork, layout and design
- John Bray − bass guitar
- Rodney Holder − drums, percussion

== Release history ==
Country	Release date
Australia	3 September 2007
Canada	2 October 2007
United States	2 October 2007
Europe	8 October 2007
Worldwide	8 October 2007
