= Pod People =

Pod People may refer to:

- Pod People (Invasion of the Body Snatchers), a fictional alien species in a novel by Jack Finney and three film adaptations
- Extra Terrestrial Visitors, an unrelated 1983 French-Spanish science fiction film renamed The Pod People for the U.S. market
- Pod People (band), an Australian doom metal band
- Podlings, the fictional race from The Dark Crystal also known as Pod People.

== See also ==
- Invasion of the Pod People, a 2007 film, also unrelated to the above
- Conformity, a major theme of the Body Snatchers franchise
