= Embryonic =

Embryonic may refer to:

- Of or relating to an embryo
- Embryonic (album), a 2009 studio album by the Flaming Lips
- Embryonics, a 2005 album by Alchemist
