= Bill Hauritz =

Australian music festival director (1953/1954–2025)

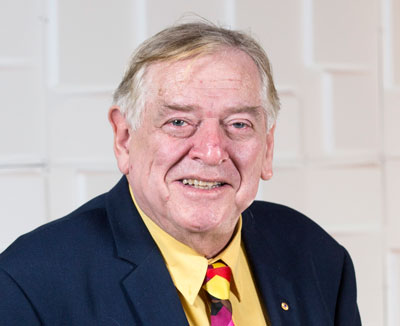
Hauritz in 2018

William Hauritz, AM (1953 or 1954 – 8 December 2025) was an Australian music festival director. He was the director of the Woodford Folk Festival held annually in Queensland, from its inception in 1994 until his retirement in 2022 when the directorship was handed to Amanda Jackes. He was instrumental in the creation of the Maleny Folk Festival which was the precursor to Woodford and ran for seven years (1986–1993) at Maleny Showgrounds. In 2018, he was named as one of the Queensland Greats by Queensland Premier Annastacia Palaszczuk in a ceremony at the Queensland Art Gallery on 8 June 2018.

Hauritz was made a Member of the Order of Australia (AM) in the 2005 Australia Day Honours for "service to the community, particularly through the establishment of the Woodford Folk Festival and leadership roles in organisations that provide a forum for the promotion of cross-cultural and artistic awareness".

He stepped down as director upon the return of the festival after a two-year COVID-19 hiatus in 2022.

Hauritz died on 8 December 2025, at the age of 71. Tributes flow in from figures in the music industry and the minister for the arts, Tony Burke.

== Awards ==
=== Queensland Music Awards ===
The Queensland Music Awards (previously known as Q Song Awards) are annual awards celebrating Queensland, Australia's brightest emerging artists and established legends. They commenced in 2006.

| Year | Nominee / work | Award | Result (wins only) |
|---|---|---|---|
| 2011 | himself | Grant McLennan Lifetime Achievement Award | awarded |
