= Lunasphere =

Studio album by Alchemist
- Released: 1 May 1995
- Recorded: November/December 1994 at Paradise Studios and Powerhouse Studios
- Genre: Progressive metal Avant-garde metal Death metal
- Length: 44:56
- Label: Thrust
- Producer: Alchemist and John Hresc

Alchemist chronology
Jar of Kingdom (1993)	Lunasphere (1995)	Spiritech (1997)

Professional ratings
Review scores
Source	Rating
Allmusic	link

Lunasphere is the second full-length album by the Australian progressive metal band Alchemist, and the first of their albums to be released by Shock Records through its metal subsidiary Thrust, in 1995. Eduardo Rivadavia of Allmusic described Lunasphere as "Like a doorway into another dimension, the Aussie group's wildly experimental songs often stand on the knife edge between control and chaos, between reason and insanity, and are capable of melding wickedly crushing heavy metal riffing with surprisingly gentle moments of quiet introspection". All of this album's tracks later appeared on the Embryonics compilation, except the instrumental fragment "Luminous". A live version of "Yoni Kunda" was used on the "Eve of the War" EP. An alternate live version of both this track and "Closed Chapter" were also included on Embryonics. "Luminous" and "Garden of Eroticism" were used in the soundtrack to a 2010 episode of the TV show Bondi Rescue.

== Track listing ==
All tracks by Alchemist

No.	Title	Writer(s)	Length
1.	"Soul Return"	Alchemist	8:18
2.	"Lunation"	Alchemist	3:47
3.	"Unfocused"	Alchemist	6:22
4.	"Luminous"	Alchemist	0:49
5.	"Clot"	Alchemist	4:36
6.	"Yoni Kunda"	Alchemist	5:10
7.	"My Animated Truth"	Alchemist	3:34
8.	"Garden of Eroticism"	Alchemist	7:22
9.	"Closed Chapter"	Alchemist	4:58

== Credits ==
- Adam Agius – vocals, guitar, keyboards
- Rodney Holder – drums
- John Bray – bass guitar
- Roy Torkington – guitar, artwork
- Alchemist and John Hresc – Production at Paradise, and Powerhouse Studios, Sydney, 1995
- John Hresc – Engineered and mixed at Sony Studios, Sydney, 1995
- Hedrush Art – Design

== Songs ==
In the song "My Animated Truth", at 2:35–2:40 a faint voice sound can be heard that says "I'm ready" in the song's background sound when the guitars end playing and then start up again. It could possibly be from a Lunasphere recording session when the band started to record too early and whether it was mistakenly or purposely incorporated into the song is unknown. Also, when reversed, the excerpt at the beginning of the song can clearly be heard saying; "nothing is real, nothing is real, nothing is real" but fading out.
