= Lola the Vamp =

Australian academic and neo-burlesque performance artist

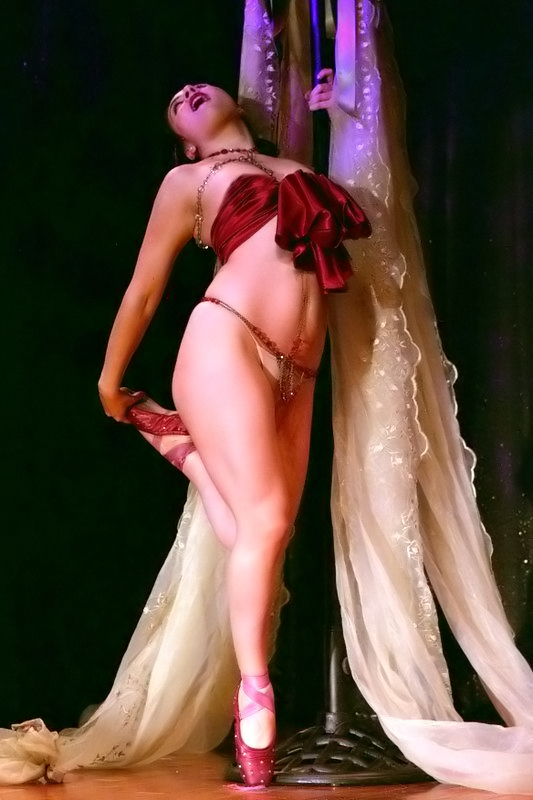
- Lola the Vamp performing at Miss Exotic World 2006
- Other names: Lola Montgomery; Meghann Montgomery
- Occupation: Senior lecturer

Academic background
- Education: Griffith University
- Thesis: A Burlesque (2013)
- Website: www.lolathevamp.com

Lola the Vamp, also known as Lola Montgomery and Meghann Montgomery, is an Australian scholar and performance artist who is part of the neo-burlesque movement. Her PhD research at Griffith University included her burlesque performance, and she is a senior lecturer at the SAE Creative Media Institute in Brisbane.

== Early life and education ==
As a dancer, Montgomery trained in ballet and modern dance. She completed her Bachelor of Arts in Creative Arts, with majors in Theatre and Visual Art at Griffith University.

Her academic work includes presentations at Tease-o-rama conferences in 2003 and 2005, at Australian National University as part of the Canberra Fringe Festival in 2009, and The Beyond Burlesque Symposium at the La Trobe University Australian Centre for the Moving Image in 2010. In 2012, she presented at the annual Australian Women's and Gender Studies conference at University of New South Wales.

She incorporated burlesque performance as part of her research for her PhD in Creative and Performing Arts at Griffith University. Her thesis, published in April 2013, is titled A Burlesque.

== Career ==
Montgomery began developing her burlesque performance in 2002. Her neo-burlesque performance is influenced by the early era of the Moulin Rouge, as well as Loie Fuller and Josephine Baker. She incorporates various props and costumes into what she has described as a "performance of the fetish."

She began her career in 2002 at Tease-o-rama in San Francisco, where she auditioned for a panel that included Dita Von Teese. Her performances have included Go Go Burlesco in Sydney, the Woodford Folk Festival, the Edinburgh Fringe Festival, and a tour of the east coast of Australia. She began performing at the Australian Burlesque Festival in 2010, and was a headline act in 2013. She performed at Tease-o-rama in 2005, and was a headliner in 2008 with Cirque Du Soleil, Catherine D'lish, Dirty Martini and Kitten on the Keys. She also performed in Vamp & Burn at the Wonderland Spiegeltent with Desert Blues Cartel.

A 2008 review in The Age of her performance at Melbourne's Butterfly Club highlighted her "sophisticated props such as Venetian masks and duelling parasols" and described her as displaying a "highly developed aesthetic and a sly wit." A 2013 review in The Examiner described her headpiece as a "bejewelled shroud of feathers" with a "matching showy neckpiece," stating she "seems to be the embodiment of traditional burlesque" and "Her face and personality, and how she uses them, are all just as important as the magnificent costumes."

In 2010, she operated Dr Sketchy's Anti-Art School in Brisbane, a franchise owned by illustrator Molly Crabapple.
