= The Black Market Rhythm Co. =

Australian rock band

- Origin: Gold Coast, Australia
- Genres: Rock
- Years active: 2004–present
- Labels: Independent
- Members: Christopher Ernst; Matt Granfield; Jake O'Brien; Ben Timony
- Website: Official website

The Black Market Rhythm Co. is an Australian rock band. The group was formed in 2004, in the Gold Coast, Queensland, by singer/guitarist Christopher Ernst, bassist/guitarist Matt Granfield and drummer Wayne Bennett.

== History ==
In 2004, the band released a self titled EP under the name 'Christopher Ernst' which sold 500 copies in under two months of release. 12 months later Jake O'Brien joined the band on trumpet and shortly after the group changed its name again to 'The Black Market Rhythm Co.'.

In 2005 the band received consistent airplay on Triple J's Roots 'n All program, was selected for the AMRAP project and received Federal Government funding for a tour of Western Australia. In 2006 the band was featured on Triple J's '2006' new releases program and went on to receive regular airplay on the station and across the Macquarie Regional Radio Network. In early 2007 the band was officially nominated for Triple J's annual Hottest 100 poll.

In June 2007, drummer Wayne Bennett left the band and was replaced by Ben Timony.

The band has recently made a number of major festival appearances, including the 2008 Big Day out, 2008 Woodford Folk Festival, 2007 Queenscliff Festival, 2007 Quiksilver Pro Show and Festival of The Sun.

In late 2007 the band released a video clip directed by Jeffrey Walker and starring Brooke Harman. The clip received airplay on Rage.

The band was nominated and highly commended in the 2010 Q Song awards.

== Low-Fi Records, Hi-Fi Radio and Name Change ==
In 2008 the band released their debut album 'Low-Fi Records, Hi-Fi Radio' and dropped 'the' from its name to become Black Market Rhythm Co. The album received critical acclaim and garnered a four star review in The Australian newspaper's Review section, with critic Sarah Elks deeming the album 'as fresh as newly-baked bread and just as easy to devour'. Music website Faster Louder declared the album a must-buy.

== Notable Festival Appearances ==
- 2008 Big Day Out
- 2008 Woodford Folk Festival
- 2007 Queenscliff Music Festival
- 2006 Woodford Folk Festival
- 2006 Festival of the Sun
- 2007 Quiksilver Pro Show

== Discography ==
=== EPs ===
- Christopher Ernst (2004)
- The Black Market Rhythm Co. Live at Brannigans (2005)
- Christopher Ernst and The Black Market Rhythm Co. (2006)
- Ain't For Sale (2006)

=== Albums ===
- Low-Fi Records, Hi-Fi Radio (2008)
