= The Ellis Collective =

- Origin: Canberra, Australia
- Genres: Indie folk
- Years active: 2007–present

The Ellis Collective is an Australian indie folk band from Canberra.

== History ==
As a part of the Canberra music scene the band first began performing under the name of The Ellis Collective in late 2007, and quickly gained local popularity. In 2008 they appeared at the National Folk Festival where they were well received. They have performed at festivals across Australia including the Woodford Folk Festival.

== Members ==
Current band members include:

- Matty Ellis (Guitar / Vocals)
- Sam King (Guitar / Vocals)
- Spike Thompson (Cello)
- Dan Kempers (Drums)
- Emma Kelly (Violin / Vocals)
- Simon Milman (Bass)

== Discography ==
The Ellis Collective have announced the release of their debut album under the Longhaul Records Label due in late 2010. The band's unofficial sale of hand-made "Orange EPs' post-show have received strong reviews.

The Ellis Collective released their debut album in July 2011 shortly after winning Triple J's Unearthed Competition. They are currently recording their second album at Studio 301 in Sydney with producer Andrew Edgeson.
