= Regular John =

Australian psychedelic rock band

- Origin: Griffith, New South Wales, Australia
- Genres: Psychedelic rock, alternative rock
- Labels: Difrnt Music, Chatterbox Records
- Members: Ryan Adamson; Caleb Goman; Ryan McDonald; Miles Devine
- Past members: Brock Tengstrom

Regular John are an Australian psychedelic rock band formed in Griffith, New South Wales. The band consists of Ryan Adamson (guitar, vocals, synths), Caleb Goman (bass, vocals), Ryan McDonald (drums) and Miles Devine (guitar). Their first EP Marrickville 2204 was released in 2007 and followed by the single Devils Melody. Both were released on Sydney based independent label Chatterbox Records. The Marrickville EP was named after the Sydney suburb where the group lived and rehearsed for a time. A bootleg of home recordings entitled The Ivanhoe Demos also exists and contains early versions of some tracks from The Peaceful Atom is a Bomb.

In May 2009, they released their debut album The Peaceful Atom is a Bomb on Difrnt Music. The album was produced by Tim Powles of The Church and recorded at his Spacejunk Studios. The album was awarded Triple J Feature Album and a place in the Australian Rolling Stone magazine's Top 50 albums of 2009. The Peaceful Atom... retained the Punk, Stoner rock and Hardcore influences of earlier material but also incorporated elements of Prog, Pop and Psychedelia. After touring with The Bronx, Helmet, Monster Magnet and Dinosaur Jr, the group were named Best Rock Act of 2009 by Australian Rolling Stone magazine. Three singles were released; 'Language', 'We Spell Love' and 'Transmitter', which featured on the soundtrack for the game Need For Speed: Shift.

In mid-2010, original guitarist Brock Tengstrom left the group and Miles Devine joined. In early 2011, Regular John appeared at the Big Day Out and shortly afterward toured nationally with Motörhead before going into the studio again with Powles for work on their second album. Recorded again at Spacejunk Studios over summer 2011-2012, Strange Flowers was released on 15 September 2012. The first single from the album was 'Slume'. It was accompanied by a video directed by Joel Rhys Burrows. The single received strong airplay in Australia, being nominated for FBI Radio's Song of the Year as part of their Sydney Music, Arts & Culture Award. It was added to over 100 college radio stations in the US and received two CMJ adds in its first week of airplay.

The album was a stylistic departure for the group, showcasing a more textured and psychedelic direction and a move away from the shorter, punkier tracks of the first album toward longer, more experimental songs. It received positive reviews with Rolling Stone awarding it four stars and calling it 'the sort of album bands would expect to make twenty years into their career'. James Dawson of the Music Network called it 'everything a rock album should be: honest, edgy and damn right powerful'.

In November 2012, Strange Flowers was nominated for a J Award for Australian Album of the Year and awarded Feature Album on Triple J. It appeared in The Music Network's Top 20 albums of 2012 and made end of year lists on various blogs.

The group has stated that their musical influences include Roxy Music, Kyuss, The Smashing Pumpkins, At The Drive In, Pink Floyd, Shellac and PJ Harvey, and claim to be just as influenced by film, literature and philosophy. Goman has credited the works of Bill Hicks, Terence McKenna, David Lynch, Philip K. Dick, Arthur C. Clarke, Stanley Kubrick, Stanislav Grof and Robert Anton Wilson as being especially influential.

== Members ==
- Ryan Adamson - guitar, synths, omnichord, vocals
- Caleb Goman - bass, vocals
- Ryan McDonald - drums
- Miles Devine - guitar, organ

== Discography ==
Studio albums

- The Peaceful Atom Is A Bomb (2009)
- Strange Flowers (2012)

EP

- Marrickville 2204 (2007)

== Awards and nominations ==
=== J Award ===
The J Awards are an annual series of Australian music awards that were established by the Australian Broadcasting Corporation's youth-focused radio station Triple J. They commenced in 2005.

Year	Nominee / work	Award	Result
J Awards of 2012	Strange Flowers	Australian Album of the Year	Nominated
