= Henry's Anger =

Australian metal band

- Origin: Canberra, Australia
- Genres: Alternative metal, nu metal
- Years active: 1994–2000
- Label: Chatterbox
- Past members: Matt Coffey (drums); Rod Yates (bass, piano); Paddy Coffey (guitar); Jamie Thomas (vocals); Steve Simmons (vocals); Malcolm McAllister (guitar and vocals); Michael Patrick Monaghan aka Zebra Nowhere (vocals, keyboards, sampling)

Henry's Anger was a Canberra-based metal band, active in the 1990s. Their second album, Personality Test, was nominated for an ARIA Award for Best Rock Album

They supported many acts such as Deftones, Mr. Bungle, Suicidal Tendencies, Unsane, Strife, Regurgitator and The Mark of Cain.

== Biography ==
The band was formed in 1994 and were finalists in the Australian National University's Campus Bands competition. That year it received an ACT cultural grant and released the Honest Brutality, Horrific Beauty demo tape. The demo tape was popular, selling about 350 copies by September 1995, helping them to establish a committed local following.

After the release of the Interfere EP, original guitarist Malcolm McAllister and vocalist Michael Patrick Monaghan left to join forces with previous members of the rock band "Stickman" and folk duo "Plutoastia" to create the Canberra Acid folk outfit "The Way Hip Antelopes".

== Discography ==
=== Albums ===
Title	Album details
Blacklining	Released: 1997; Label: D.C Records (DC999); Format: CD
Personality Test	Released: 1999; Label: Chatterbox Records (CB005); Format: CD

=== Extended Plays ===
Title	EP details
Honest Brutality, Horrific Beauty	Released: 1994; Label: Henry's Anger; Format: CD (demo)
Interfere	Released: 1996; Label: Henry's Anger (DDR 001); Format: CD

== Awards and nominations ==
=== ARIA Music Awards ===
The ARIA Music Awards are a set of annual ceremonies presented by Australian Recording Industry Association (ARIA), which recognise excellence, innovation, and achievement across all genres of the music of Australia. They commenced in 1987.

Year	Nominee / work	Award	Result	Ref.
1999	Personality Test	Best Rock Album	Nominated	
