= Spiritech =

Studio album by Alchemist
- Released: June 30, 1997
- Recorded: November 1996 at Rocking Horse Studios
- Genre: Progressive metal Avant-garde metal Death metal
- Length: 61:26
- Label: Thrust
- Producer: Alchemist and John Hresc

Alchemist chronology
Lunasphere (1995)	Spiritech (1997)	Eve of the War (1998)

Professional ratings
Review scores
Source	Rating
Allmusic	link
PyroMusic	9.6/10 link^{[usurped]}

Spiritech is the third full-length studio album by the Australian progressive metal band Alchemist. It was released in 1997 by Australian label Thrust and distributed by Shock Records. A promotional music video for the song "Road to Ubar" was released. "Spiritechnology" samples Ronald Reagan speaking on extraterrestrial life and its possible effect on religion, while "Chinese Whispers" has become popular at live shows. The album has received very positive reviews, with Eduardo Rivadavia from Allmusic suggesting it is "possibly the greatest space metal album since Voivod's landmark Nothingface, adding that Alchemist "meshed [death metal] seamlessly with progressive rock, psychedelia, Middle Eastern nuances, and even native Australian aboriginal music". The album's lyrics tend to explore the relationship between human technology and its impact on nature, and the possibility of extraterrestrial life.

The first five tracks from Spiritech later appeared on the Embryonics compilation album.

== Track listing ==
No.	Title	Writer(s)	Length
1.	"Chinese Whispers"	Alchemist	9:33
2.	"Road to Ubar"	Alchemist	5:39
3.	"Staying Conscious"	Alchemist	5:42
4.	"Beyond Genesis"	Alchemist	7:19
5.	"Spiritechnology"	Alchemist	6:32
6.	"Inertia"	Alchemist	5:00
7.	"Hermaphroditis"	Alchemist	4:32
8.	"Dancing to Life"	Alchemist	6:03
9.	"Figments"	Alchemist	11:06

== Credits ==
- Adam Agius − vocals, guitar, keyboards
- Rodney Holder − drums
- John Bray − bass guitar
- Roy Torkington − guitar, illustrations
- John Hresc − Engineering at Rocking Horse Studios, Byron Bay, New South Wales, November 1996
- Alchemist and D.W. Norton − Production
- D.W. Norton − Mixing at Backbeach Studios, Victoria, March 1997
- Sally Moore − Design
