= Matt Granfield =

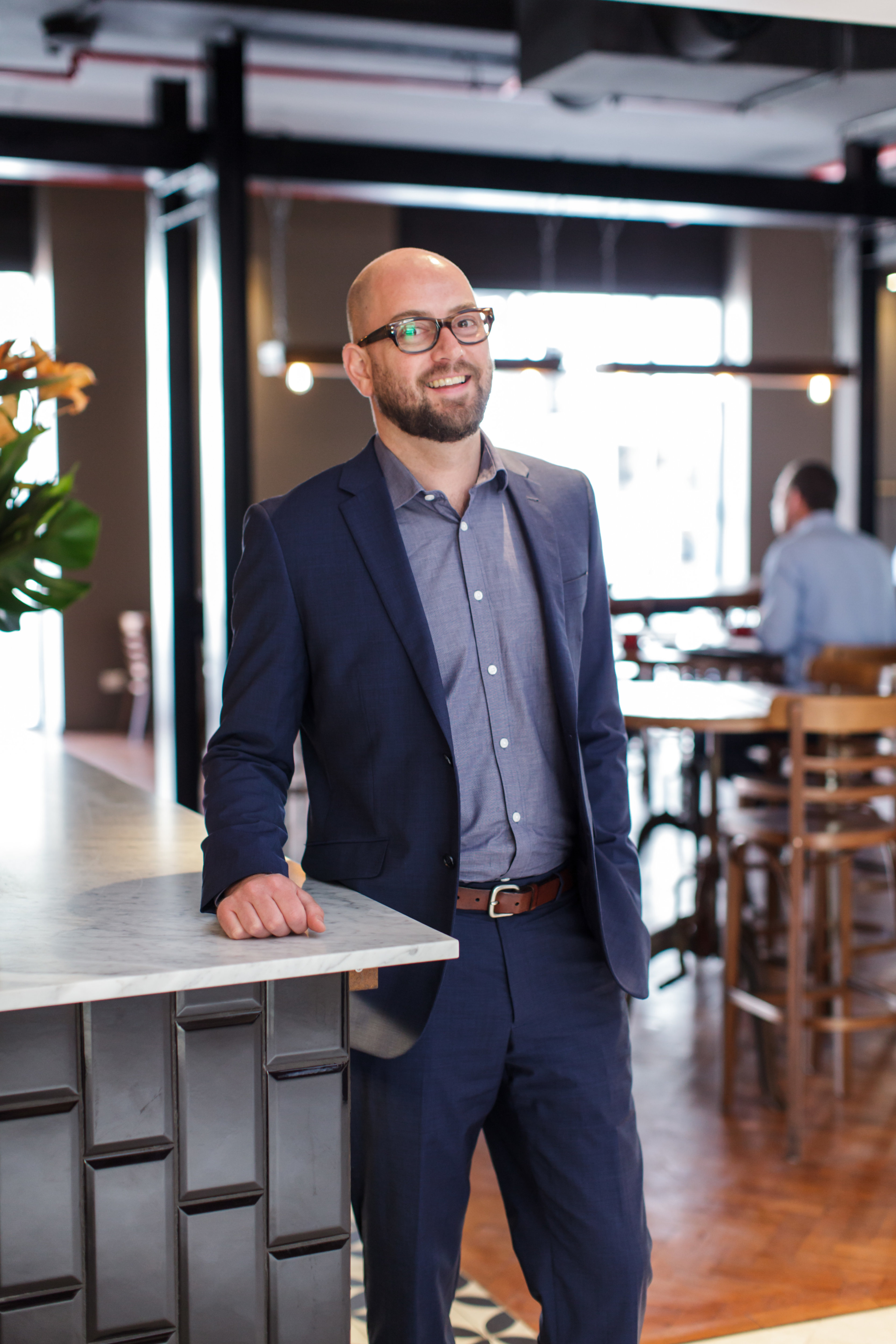
- Born: Nowra, Australia
- Citizenship: Australian
- Education: University of Queensland
- Occupations: Writer, Business Executive
- Website: http://thegranfields.com

Matthew Granfield is an Australian writer and business person. He is founder and chair of homelessness charity Spare Keys.

== Education ==
Granfield was educated at Harvard Business School, the University of Queensland and Trinity Lutheran College.

== Career ==
=== Journalism ===
After graduating university Granfield was accepted into the News Limited cadet reporter program where he worked as a journalist for several newspapers. He writes for the Australian Broadcasting Corporation's The Drum website, was an editor of Marketing Magazine and regularly contributes to numerous other publications, including Maxim, Crikey, and The Courier Mail's Q Weekend Magazine.

=== Charity Work ===
Granfield is the founder of homelessness charity Spare Keys and a TEDx presenter on the topic of domestic and family violence.

=== Music ===
Granfield was a founding member and songwriter for Q Song Award nominated Queensland rock group The Black Market Rhythm Co.

=== Writing and Impact on the Hipster Movement ===
In October 2011 Allen & Unwin released Granfield's first book, a satirical look at popular culture titled HipsterMattic. The Weekend Australian called it "enjoyable" with "moments of brilliance ... convincingly exposing the true absurdity" of the hipster movement.

Granfield's explanation of hipster culture has been broadly cited and recognised as one of the most eloquent definitions of the movement:

"While mainstream society of the 2000s (decade) had been busying itself with reality television, dance music, and locating the whereabouts of Britney Spears's underpants, an uprising was quietly and conscientiously taking place behind the scenes. Long-forgotten styles of clothing, beer, cigarettes and music were becoming popular again. Retro was cool, the environment was precious, and old was the new 'new'. Kids wanted to wear Sylvia Plath's cardigans and Buddy Holly's glasses—they revelled in the irony of making something so nerdy so cool. They wanted to live sustainably and eat organic gluten-free grains. Above all, they wanted to be recognised for being different—to diverge from the mainstream and carve a cultural niche all for themselves. For this new generation, style wasn't something you could buy in a department store, it became something you found in a thrift shop, or, ideally, made yourself. The way to be cool wasn't to look like a television star: it was to look like as though you'd never seen television."

== Bibliography ==
=== Non fiction ===
- HipsterMattic, Allen and Unwin, 2011 ISBN 978-1-74237-785-8
