= Skulker =

Australian rock band

- Origin: Sydney
- Genres: Rock
- Years active: 1994–2005
- Label: Chatterbox Records
- Past members: Greer Skinner; Annette Harada; Angela Blackshaw; Naomi "Batti" Battah; Gregory Boulting

Skulker was an ARIA Award-nominated rock band from Sydney that formed in 1994. After two albums, the group parted ways in 2005.

== History ==
The group's original members met at Cheltenham Girls High School in northern Sydney in 1994 and decided to form a band. The original line-up consisted of Greer Skinner on lead vocals and guitar, Annette Harada on bass guitar, Naomi "Batti" Battah on guitar and occasional lead vocals and drummer Angela Blackshaw.

After an initial period establishing itself on the Sydney live circuit the band came to the attention of independent label Chatterbox Records and in 2000 Skulker released the album Too Fat for Tahiti. The title was apparently inspired by the band being rejected for a gig as a house band at a resort in Tahiti because they were "too fat".

Too Fat for Tahiti spawned the singles "Naughty" and "Hëj" which received considerable support from the national youth radio station Triple J; both were voted into the network's annual listeners' poll, the Triple J Hottest 100, 2000 at number 50 and 80 respectively. The album was subsequently nominated for ARIA Award for Best Independent Release and Best New Live Act at the Australian Music Awards.

In 2003, the band released their second studio album, The Double Life. A free download-only single "Rock Nugget" was released. It was downloaded over 20,000 times and received high rotation on Triple J. The band also played alongside one of their major music influences, Veruca Salt, in Sydney's The Metro Theatre in July that year. The band released the singles "Coming Home" and "In Your Arms" and played the Big Day Out tour in 2004. Early 2004 also found the band opening for Pink in Sydney and Newcastle and touring nationally supporting The Superjesus.

At this point Batti decided to depart the band and moved to Canada to pursue other interests. Following the replacement of Batti with new guitarist Gregory Boulting, Skulker toured the east coast of Australia and recorded extensive demos of new material that have never been released. The band members have since decided to go their own ways and pursue further interests.

== Discography ==
=== Albums ===
Title	Details	Peak chart positions
Title	Details	AUS
Too Fat for Tahiti	Released: February 2000; Label: Chatterbox (CB009); Format: CD	—
The Double Life	Released: March 2003; Label: Chatterbox (CB026); Format: CD	79

=== Extended play ===
Title	Details
Morgan to the Moon	Released: 1998; Label: Skulker; Format: CD

=== Singles ===
Title	Year	Album
"Bittersweet"	1998	non-album single
"Hëj"	2000	Too Fat for Tahiti
"Naughty"	2000	Too Fat for Tahiti
"Newport Nightmare"/"Strawberry Deluxe"	2000	Too Fat for Tahiti
"Coming Home"	2003	The Double Life
"In Your Arms"	2003	The Double Life

== Awards and nominations ==
=== ARIA Music Awards ===
The ARIA Music Awards are a set of annual ceremonies presented by Australian Recording Industry Association (ARIA), which recognise excellence, innovation, and achievement across all genres of the music of Australia. They commenced in 1987.

Year	Nominee / work	Award	Result	Ref.
2000	Too Fat for Tahiti	Best Independent Release	Nominated	
