= Laura Imbruglia =

Australian singer (born 1983)

- Born: 15 June 1983 (age 43); Sydney, Australia
- Genres: Indie rock; alternative rock
- Occupations: Singer; musician; songwriter
- Instruments: Vocals; guitar
- Years active: 2000–present
- Label: Chatterbox
- Website: lauraimbruglia.com

Laura Imbruglia (born 15 June 1983) is an Australian indie rock singer-songwriter.

== Early life and family ==
Imbruglia's father is an Italian of Sicilian heritage and her mother Anglo-Australian. She grew up on the Central Coast as the youngest of four sisters, the second of whom is pop-alternative singer and actress Natalie Imbruglia. Imbruglia has insisted on maintaining her musical career independent of her famous sibling.

== Career ==
Imbruglia grew up listening to Bob Dylan, The Carpenters and Queen, the latter being the largest influence on her: she proudly wears a tattoo of Freddie Mercury on her right arm. She worked in a record store at one point and enjoys performing on karaoke.

Imbruglia has released a single, EP and four albums. Her debut album was released through Chatterbox Records/MGM, Silversonic Records (DE) and Strange Ears (DK), and the others were released independently through her own label Ready Freddie Records. She was featured on jtv, where "Looking for a Rabbit" was voted No. 2 music video of the year in 2007, and MTV Australia and performed at the 2002 Homebake festival. She has appeared on the television drama series Crash Palace.

Imbruglia toured Europe in late 2007 and March 2008 to promote her self-titled album, including dates in Germany, Switzerland, Austria, Denmark and the UK. She released her second album "The Lighter Side Of..." in 2010, prior to relocating from Sydney NSW to Melbourne VIC. Imbruglia chose "depressing, countrified, stark, humorous and bent," as five words to sum up the record.

In 2013, Imbruglia released country album "What A Treat" with a new band composed of Melbourne musicians.

From 2015 to 2017, she embarked on a new career – producing, writing and hosting web series "Amateur Hour" – an episodic arts and culture show based in Melbourne which featured the popular skit "Gender Reversed Guitar Shopping" along with performances from emerging and established Australian musicians and interviews with creatives.

In 2019, she returned to music, releasing her fourth album "Scared Of You".

== Personal life ==
As of 2010, Imbruglia was based in Melbourne.

== Discography ==
- It Makes a Crunchy Noise (2003) – EP
- "My Dream of a Magical Washing Machine" (2005) – single
- Laura Imbruglia (2006) – album
- The Lighter Side of... (2010) – album
- What A Treat (2013) – album
- Scared Of You (2019) – album
