= Blue Grassy Knoll =

Australian musical group

- Origin: Melbourne, Australia
- Genres: Gypsy Bluegrass; Filmscores
- Years active: 2007-present
- Label: Way Over There
- Spinoffs: Blue Movie Knoll; Blue Brassy Knoll; Blue Spicy Knoll; The Case Managers; Adana; The Chilli Pickers
- Members: Simon Barfoot; Gus Macmillan; Steph O'Hara; Phil McLeod; Mark Elton
- Past members: Alex Miller; Dan Whitton; Phil Collings; Tamil Rogen
- Website: bluegrassyknoll.com

Blue Grassy Knoll are a 5-piece gypsy-bluegrass ensemble that formed in Melbourne in 1996. Original members were Steph O'Hara (violin, mandolin), Simon Barfoot (guitar, vocals, drums) Gus Macmillan (Banjo, Flute) Philip McLeod (accordion, cello, mandolin, harmonica) and Alex Miller (double bass). The current line up features O'Hara, Barfoot, Macmillan and McLeod with Mark Elton (double bass, tuba) joining in 2007. Other members have included Dan Witton (double bass, 1999–2000), Phil Collings (guitar/drums, 2001) and Tamil Rogen (violin 2005).

Over their 13-year career they have created a body of work encompassing five feature-length live filmscores, five short live filmscores, released 4 albums, and have embarked on multiple international tours, performing at festivals on all 5 continents. Some of the highlights being seasons at The New Victory Theater, New York, the Edinburgh Festival, Royal National Theatre, London, the Sydney Opera House, and festival appearances in Ireland, China, South Africa, Brazil, Korea, Germany, the Netherlands and New Zealand.

After a 4-month tour across the US and Canada in 2003 the band were beginning to experience touring fatigue and only performed sparingly over the next 4 years, playing once a year at festivals such as Sydney's Rocks Aroma Coffee Festival in 2004 and 2005 and the Singapore Arts Festival in 2006. A turning point for the band came in 2007 when they were commissioned by the Victorian Arts Centre to create a new score for the 1922 Chinese silent film Labourer's Love, which toured to Beijing and Shanghai as part of the Australian Theatre Festival. They found themselves reinvigorated by success of this project, as well as the following Australian performances at the Westgarth Film Festival and 2007-2008 Woodford Folk Festival, and the company have resumed their career as an ongoing venture.

In 2009 the band obtained funding from the Victorian Arts Centre's Full Tilt fund to develop a new score to Buster Keaton's classic 1926 film The General and commenced 4 weeks paid rehearsal as artists-in-residence at the Arts Centre in July/August. They performed this new score in 2010.

== Television appearances ==
They appeared on the RMITV show Under Melbourne Tonight on 17 April 1996.
