= Moaning Lisa (band) =

Australian rock band

- Origin: Canberra, Australia
- Genres: Alternative rock; punk rock; grunge
- Years active: 2016–present
- Labels: Farmer & the Owl (2021+)
- Members: Charlie Versegi; Hayley Manwaring; Ellen Chan; Hayden Fritzlaff
- Past members: Andrew Enright
- Website: moaninglisa.band

Moaning Lisa are an Australian rock band formed in Canberra in 2016. The group has released two EPs, The Sweetest in 2017, and Do You Know Enough? in 2018.

The four members of Moaning Lisa studied music in Canberra. They are singer-bassist Charlie Versegi, singer-guitarist Hayley Manwaring, lead guitarist Ellen Chan, and drummer Hayden Fritzlaff. Their music has been described as punk rock, grunge rock, and shoegaze. In 2016, they won the National Campus Band Competition, and garnered media coverage for speaking out against anti-social behaviour at gigs.

In January 2018, their single "Carrie (I Want a Girl)", referencing Carrie Brownstein, was lauded as an anthem for the LGBT community. That same year, Moaning Lisa won the National Live Music Award for ACT Live Act of the Year.

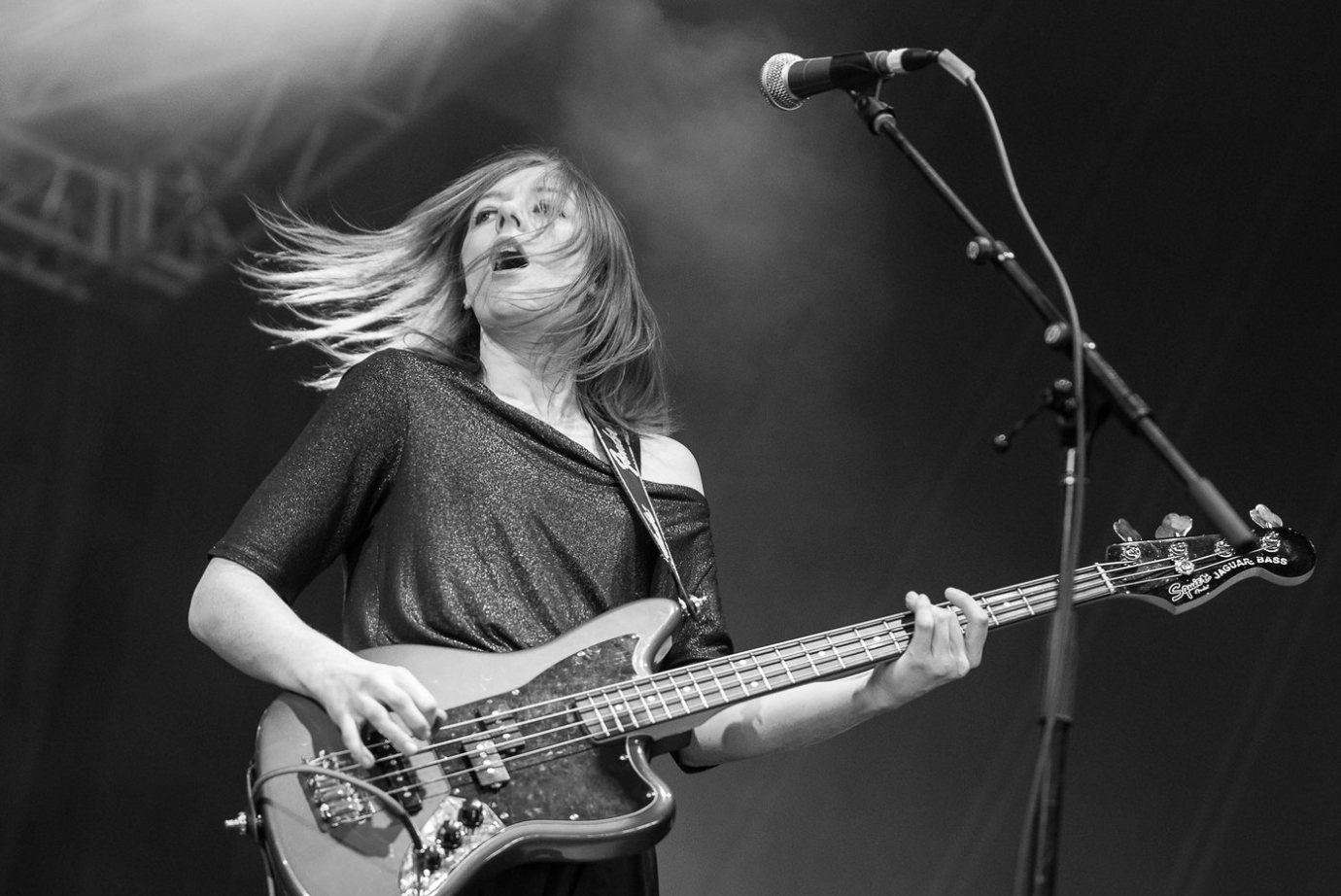
Hayley Manwaring of Moaning Lisa performing at Splendour in the Grass in Byron Bay in 2019

On tour, Moaning Lisa have supported the likes of Mitski, Ride, Midnight Oil, DZ Deathrays, Waax, Camp Cope, and Polish Club. They have also performed at Spilt Milk and Yours and Owls, with upcoming performances at Splendour in the Grass and Stonefest.

In 2021, the band signed with Farmer & the Owl and released "Something" in March 2021 and "Inadequacy" in June 2021. The band's debut album Something Like This But Not This was released on 8 October 2021.

On September 13th, 2024, the band announced their forthcoming sophomore album fainter, will be released on November 22, 2024.

== Discography ==
=== Studio albums ===
| Title | Details | Peak chart positions |
| Title | Details | AUS |
|---|---|---|
| Something Like This But Not This | Released: 8 October 2021; Label: Farmer & the Owl; Format: Digital download, streaming, vinyl | 85 |

=== Extended plays ===
| Title | Details |
|---|---|
| The Sweetest | Released: 24 March 2017; Label: Moaning Lisa; Format: Digital download, streaming |
| Do You Know Enough? | Released: 19 October 2018; Label: Moaning Lisa; Format: Digital download, streaming |

=== Singles ===
| Title | Year | Album |
|---|---|---|
| "Carrie (I Want a Girl)" | 2018 | Do You Know Enough? |
| "Good" | 2018 | Do You Know Enough? |
| "Take You Out" | 2019 | non album single |
| "Something" | 2021 | Something Like This But Not This |
| "Inadequacy" | 2021 | Something Like This But Not This |
| "Cold Water" | 2021 | Something Like This But Not This |

== Awards and nominations ==
=== National Live Music Awards ===
The National Live Music Awards (NLMAs) are a broad recognition of Australia's diverse live industry, celebrating the success of the Australian live scene. The awards commenced in 2016.

| Year | Nominee / work | Award | Result |
|---|---|---|---|
| National Live Music Awards of 2018 | Moaning Lisa | ACT Live Act of the Year | Won |
| National Live Music Awards of 2019 | Hayley Manwaring (Moaning Lisa) | Live Bassist of the Year | Nominated |

=== National Campus Band Competition ===
The National Campus Band Competition is an Australia-wide live music competition specifically for tertiary students. Bands participate in heats to win the chance to represent their state in the finals. After winning their heat in the ACT, Moaning Lisa attended the final performance at Melbourne venue Nothcote Social Club, winning three days of studio time where they would record their first EP, and cash prize. Previous notable winners include Jebediah and Eskimo Joe.
