= Stonefest =

Annual festival in Canberra

Stonefest (sometimes referred to as Stone Week) is an annual festival held at the University of Canberra during week eleven of the second semester to celebrate the laying of the university's Foundation Stone. Stonefest is run by UC Live - the music and live entertainment division of the UCX (the University of Canberra Union), who have been responsible for the event for its entire life span.

== History ==
Stone Day started as a celebration at the University of Canberra held annually to mark the laying of the foundation stone by Prime Minister John Gorton on 28 October 1968. This founded the Canberra College of Advanced Education, which became the University of Canberra in 1990.

The first foundation celebrations were held in 1971. In 1973 Stone Day celebrations were held over two days, which was expanded to take up a whole week in 1976. In the 1980s and 1990s Stoneweek became a popular Canberra entertainment event. In the 1990s it was given themes such as "Return to Woodstock", "Circus", "Back to the Beach", "Alien Abduction", "Oktoberfest", "Halloween" and "Stoneage". In the year 2000 the festival became Stonefest.

For many years Stonefest was the largest music festival in Canberra and a popular one in Australia. In recent years other festivals have made their way onto the Canberra scene, including Groovin' The Moo (also on the University of Canberra Campus) and Foreshore Summer Music Festival, contributing to declining numbers for Stonefest. In 2012, organisers made the decision to return the festival to its roots as a university celebration, re-branding the event as Stone Day, giving it a fresh new look and feel and returning tickets to the student-friendly price of $25.

In June 2019, Stonefest social media channels became active after a long hiatus, teasing the festival's return. On 11 June the lineup for Stonefest 2019 was announced, featuring artists from the local Canberra area, wider Australian music scene and a notable international artist in Example.

Stonefest re-appeared in 2022 following the COVID-19 Pandemic in a smaller capacity on UC Lawns with Vera Blue and Ruby Fields headlining. The returned again in 2023 with heavy Ball Park Music and UK sensation Bakar.

Due to the recent success of the festival and community demand, Stonefest will return bigger and better in 2024 with the lineup due to drop in June.

== Past lineups ==
=== 2001 ===
"Super Heroes".

- Artists included:
  - The Cruel Sea

=== 2002 ===
"A New Frontier".

- Artists included:
  - TISM - one of the band members famously climbed up onto a nearby balcony totally nude.
  - Machine Gun Fellatio
  - Waikiki
  - Little Smoke
  - Groove Terminator
  - Mikah FreemaN
  - Jono Fernandez
  - Archie

=== 2003 ===
"Batteries Included".

- Friday 31 October - Saturday 1 November 2003
- Superstage(on the lawns outside UCU Bar), The Hub (Friday Only), The Arena (UC Refectory)(Friday Only)
- Artists included:
  - 1 November: Regurgitator, 28 Days, Magic Dirt, Gerling, For Amusement Only, Epicure, Love Outside Andromeda (known then as just Andromeda)
  - 31 October: Resin Dogs, Zephyr Timbre, Biftek, Koolism, Kid Kenobi with MC Shureshock, The Herd, Spod, Karton, Chris Fraser, Groove Terminator, Archie, Nervous, Katch, Hyperion, Typhonic, Brewster B, Anjay, Bec Paton

=== 2004 ===
"The Proud, The Loud, The Many" (featuring an oriental theme).

- Superstage(on the lawns outside UCU Bar), The Hub (Friday Only), The Arena (UC Refectory)(Friday Only)
- Artists included:
  - Something for Kate
  - Von Bondies
  - Groove Armada
  - Butterfingers
  - Rocket Science

=== 2005 ===
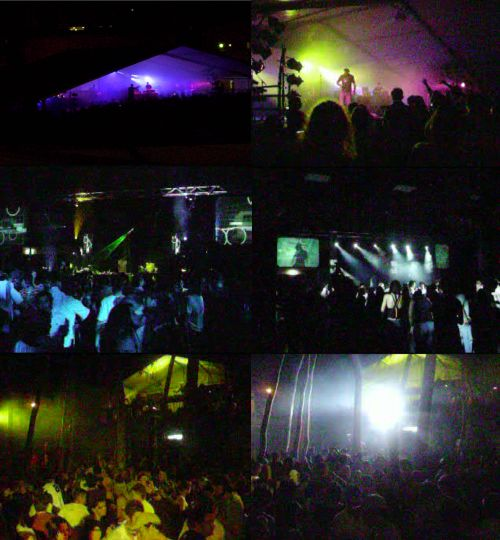
Stonefest 2005

"Your Own Wonderland" headlined by The Living End.

- Friday 28 October - Saturday 29 October 2005
- Superstage(on the lawns outside UCU Bar), The Hub (Friday Only), The Arena (UC Refectory)(Friday Only)
- Artists included:
  - Friday 28 October: Decoder Ring, The Presets, Greg Packer, Cabin Crew
  - Saturday 29 October: Butterfingers, Thirsty Merc, Faker (band), The Beautiful Girls, Detroit band Electric Six, Casual Projects and The Living End

=== 2006 ===
"Your Own Backyard" headlined by Hoodoo Gurus headlined the 2006 festival.

- Friday 27 October-Saturday 28 October 2006
- Superstage(on the lawns outside UCU Bar), The Arena (UC Refectory)(Friday Only)
- Changes to the organisation of the festival saw the omission of The Hub as a stage.
- Artists included:
  - Regurgitator
  - The Herd
  - Kid Kenobi
  - Urge Overkill
  - Sarah Blasko
  - The Avalanches
  - The Hoodoo Gurus

=== 2007 ===
"Carnivàle"

- Friday 26 October-Saturday 27 October 2007
- Superstage (on the lawns outside UCU Bar), The Hub (Friday Only), The Arena (UC Refectory) (Friday Only)
- 2007 saw the return of The Hub stage.
- Artists included:
  - Butterfingers
  - Cut Copy
  - Expatriate
  - Scribe
  - Paul Kelly
  - The Waifs
  - The Mess Hall
  - Grand Fatal
  - Young and Restless
  - Milkbar Nick

=== 2008 ===
"Celebrating 40 Years"

- Superstage(moved to Oval 1), The Arena (UC Refectory)(Friday Only)
- Changes to the organisation of the festival saw the end of The Hub as a stage.
- Artists included:
  - Regurgitator
  - Kora
  - The Grates
  - Faker - vocalist Nathan Hudson in usual style climbed the stage's structure multiple times
  - Blue King Brown
  - The Dandy Warhols
  - Grinspoon
  - plus others

=== 2009 ===
"Halloween"

- Saturday 31 October
- Superstage (Oval 1), The Bally (Circus and Freakshow performances)
- In 2009 Stonefest turned into a one-day festival in order to deliver a lineup that competed with the other 1 day music festivals recently introduced into the Canberra market in Trackside and Foreshore Summer Music Festival.
- Artists included:
  - The Living End
  - Birds of Tokyo
  - Josh Pyke
  - Frenzal Rhomb - guitarist Lindsay "The Doctor" McDougall stapled his set list to a freakshow performer's chest during their set, while lead man Jay Whalley walked over a girl while she lay on glass.
  - British India
  - Children Collide
  - Urthboy
  - Art vs. Science
  - MM9
  - Jericco
  - Ashleigh Mannix
  - Hancock Basement

=== 2010 ===
"Turn Up The Heat"

- Saturday 30 October
- The Superstage (Oval 1), The Silent Party
- The Silent Party was introduced in 2010 and featured Australia's best indie party DJ's.
- Artists included:
  - Pendulum
  - Bliss N Eso
  - Does It Offend You, Yeah?
  - Spiderbait
  - Airbourne
  - Xavier Rudd
  - Clare Bowditch & The New Slang
  - Bluejuice
  - Operator Please
  - Boy & Bear
  - Last Dinosaurs
  - Deep Sea Arcade
  - Los Capitanes
  - Purple Sneakers DJs
  - Silent Party hosted by Funktrust DJs

=== 2019 ===
- Saturday 19 October
- UC Refectory, UC Hub
- Artists included:
  - Mallrat
  - Skegss
  - Example (UK)
  - British India
  - Ceres
  - Thelma Plum
  - Japanese Wallpaper
  - Moaning Lisa
  - Good Doogs
  - RAAVE Tapes
  - Cry Club
  - FRITZ
  - Genesis Owusu
  - Sampa the Great
  - Ninajirachi
  - Pagan
  - Teen Jesus and the Jean Teasers
  - Sputnik Sweetheart

=== 2022 ===
- Vera Blue
- Ruby Fields
- Luca Brasi
- Hope D
- Arno Faraji
- ARCHIE
- Miroji

=== 2023 ===
- Bakar (UK)
- Ball Park Music
- Dune Rats
- Becca Hatch
- Ike(From)Pluto
- Smartcasual
- Sophie Edwards

=== 2024 ===
- Teenage Dads
- MAY-A
- Mansionair
- Great Gable
- The Buoys
- Kitschen Boy
- Lucy Sugerman
- Zach Knows
- Sonic Reducer
- Jett Blyton
