= Alchemist (band) =

Australian progressive metal band

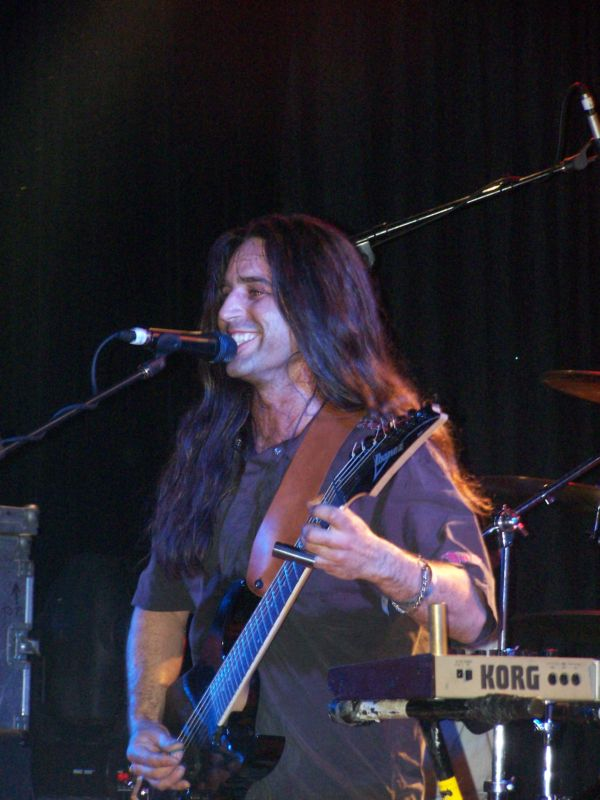
- Adam Agius live in 2006

Background information
- Origin: Canberra, Australia
- Genres: Progressive metal, avant-garde metal, death metal
- Years active: 1987–2010 (hiatus)
- Labels: Relapse; Chatterbox; Shock; Lethal; Displeased
- Spinoffs: Exceed
- Past members: Adam Agius; John Bray; Rodney Holder; Roy Torkington; Scott Chivers; Andrew Meredith; Murray Neill; Nick Paddon-Row; James Preece; Nick Wall; Nathan Willis (Filled in when Roy Torkington broke his wrist)
- Website: alchemist.com.au

Alchemist was an Australian progressive metal band from Canberra that combined death metal, progressive rock, psychedelic, Eastern, Aboriginal and electronic influences. The band formed in 1987 and released six studio albums, an EP, and a compilation album. Work began on a new EP in 2010, but the band went on an indefinite hiatus and then split up. They are the only group to appear at every Metal for the Brain festival, an event they ran and organised from 1996. Alchemist played at the Big Day Out and toured Europe several times.

== History ==
=== 1987−1992 ===
Adam Agius (lead vocals/guitar) formed Alchemist as a death metal act in 1987. The band released the Eternal Wedlock demo the same year. The band's raw and undeveloped style began to evolve with the addition of new drummer Rodney Holder in 1989. The following year, the line-up of Agius, Holder, Andrew Meredith (guitar), and James Preece (bass) recorded a second demo. The demo showed the band beginning to experiment with avant-garde arrangements and psychedelic influences inspired by Pink Floyd and Frank Zappa. Another demo was produced in 1991, with Preece replaced by John (The Seal) Bray from local band Exceed. Alchemist performed at the first Metal for the Brain festival in Canberra, becoming the only group to appear in every edition. The track "Escapism" from the demo recording was featured the following year on the Roadrunner (Australia) compilation album Redrum, which included other contemporary rising metal acts such as Sadistik Exekution, Allegiance, and Shihad.

=== 1992−1996 ===
In 1992, Roy Torkington joined Alchemist in place of Meredith. By this time, the demos had created enough interest for them to be approached by Austrian label Lethal, who released their first album, Jar of Kingdom, the next year. The album was recorded in Sydney and featured an eclectic mix of death metal, grindcore and psychedelia. Two songs featured vocals from Michelle Klemke, a friend of Agius' mother. According to the notes accompanying the 2005 compilation album Embryonics, Agius lost his voice during the recording. Dissatisfied with the sound of the album, the band re-mastered and re-released it in 1999. Alchemist was dissatisfied with Lethal's handling of Jar of Kingdom and parted ways with them. After releasing Jar of Kingdom, the band went on their first tour.

During 1994, Alchemist recorded a promotional tape to shop to record companies and a version of the Venom song "Black Metal" for a Swedish tribute album called The Promoters of the Third World War: A Tribute to Venom. The band began work on its next album, Lunasphere, released in 1995 by Melbourne label Shock Records through its subsidiary Thrust. Lunasphere showed a further development of Alchemist's style, adding Eastern motifs and keyboards to its sound. The track "Garden of Eroticism" was added to the Triple J compilation album This Is Twelve (ABC/EMI) in 1996 and both this song and "Yoni Kunda" became live staples. The group supported the release of Lunasphere with a heavy touring schedule that included several shows with joint UK/Australian ambient act Deathless, a slot on the Sydney leg of the 1996 Big Day Out, supporting Cathedral and Paradise Lost on their dual headlining tour, and opening for Fear Factory a second time. They performed live-to-air on the Triple J metal program Three Hours of Power. Two songs from this session were included on the Embryonics compilation album in 2005. During the same year, pioneering Canberra death metal band Armoured Angel disbanded. The band's drummer Joel Green handed over the running of the festival to Holder, who with the rest of Alchemist was responsible for the event for the next decade.

=== 1996−2000 ===
Alchemist began recording Spiritech in late 1996. After a problematic recording process, the band handed production over to D.W. Norton, guitarist with Melbourne band Superheist and part-owner of Back Beach Studios in Rye, Victoria. Spiritech introduced more electronic elements as well as tribal rhythms and heavy sampling into the band's oeuvre and opened with the nine-minute "Chinese Whispers", which remains a favourite for group and fans.

In 1999, the band's next project was an EP whose title track was a version of "Eve of the War", the opening piece from the 1978 production Jeff Wayne's Musical Version of The War of the Worlds. Josh Nixon, from Canberra doom metal band Pod People, featured as a guest guitarist. The EP included live versions of "Yoni Kunda" and "Chinese Whispers", an electronica remix of "Yoni Kunda" retitled "Koni Yunda" and two Jar of Kingdom tracks, "Brumal: A View from Pluto" and "Worlds within Worlds." These last two were a precursor to the re-release of Jar of Kingdom the following year. This re-release included new overdubs as the album's original master tapes were damaged, and included the entire 1991 demo. This release completed their contractual obligation to Shock Records and Alchemist began to shop for a new local deal as well as international distribution. The group's albums had attained a cult following in parts of Europe, particularly in the Netherlands, but they had not had European representation since their failed association with Lethal. In the meantime, Alchemist toured with Entombed and Pitchshifter.

Late in 1999, a new Alchemist track called "Austral Spectrum" appeared on a compilation of Australian metal called Under the Southern Cross and issued by Sydney label Chatterbox Records (with whom the band had just signed for Australian release). A slightly different version of the song appeared on the Organasm album, recorded with D.W. Norton in Rye and released in early 2000. To promote Organasm, Alchemist undertook a three-month Australian tour during autumn. Billed as "World War Three", the tour featured Sydney thrash bands Cryogenic and Psi.Kore, both of whom had just released CDs. Organasm featured a warmer sound and a focus on tighter songwriting with tracks enhanced by duelling slide guitars, keyboards and samples.

=== 2000−2005 ===
Following 2000's Metal for the Brain, Alchemist went off the road for more than a year to work on Austral Alien, released by Chatterbox in May 2003. This latest album showed a mellower side of Alchemist, with polished production and an electronic sound. Influenced by rock band Midnight Oil, the lyrics of the semi-conceptual album focused on environmental issues affecting their country, specifically the impact of man on the ecology. Alchemist added a fifth member, Nick Wall, to provide samples during live shows.

In late 2004, Alchemist embarked on their first tour outside of Australia. Because of these commitments, Metal for the Brain was held off until February 2005. In the same month, Alchemist won their first Australian Heavy Metal Music Awards, with "First Contact" awarded Best Video Clip, and Agius awarded Best Keyboardist.

=== 2005−2010 ===
A compilation album, Embryonics, was released in October 2005. It covered material recorded between 1990 and 1998, including tracks from the first three albums, the 1998 EP release and demo songs. Bonus tracks included two of the songs recorded on the radio in 1996. The band announced a companion DVD due for 2006, which is yet to be released.

After ten years of organising Metal for the Brain, Alchemist laid the festival to rest, playing the final event on 4 November 2006. Holder, now based in Brisbane, moved on to organise the 20-band Abducted Metal Horror Festival held in July 2007. In May of that year, Alchemist completed work on their next album Tripsis, which the band declared to be a return to the earlier sound of Lunasphere and Spiritech. To coincide with the release of Tripsis, Alchemist headlined the European ProgPower event and played selected other dates. In July 2008, the band played at the Graspop Metal Meeting in Belgium as part of their European tour. In October 2008, Alchemist returned to Australia to tour with Meshuggah. Afterwards, the band premiered the video for "Tongues and Knives" on 9 December. In January 2010, Alchemist began recording a new EP as a follow-up to Tripsis. In an article in Sydney's Drum Media in July, drummer Rodney Holder claimed that Alchemist was on "extended hiatus". The band's website reflected this with a splash page declaring that "Alchemist are hibernating indefinitely". Holder went on to create and run a new heavy music festival named Bastardfest, inaugural shows held on 28 August in Brisbane, 4 September in Melbourne, and 16 October in Perth.

Adam Agius formed the Levitation Hex in 2010 with Mark Palfreyman of Melbourne band Alarum. They released a self-titled album in August 2012, during which time Agius talked about the hard work of being in a band, and Alchemist's eventual demise.

In 2013, just before the birth of his first child, Rodney Holder started the 'Music Business Facts' podcast, aimed at sharing tricks of the trade in interviews with successful musicians and music professionals from all over the world. He also ran a number of high-profile artist webinars and online music and production courses with artists like Devin Townsend.

Rodney Holder currently lives with his wife and two children in Brisbane.

== Band line-up ==
Personnel

- Adam Agius − vocals, guitar, keyboards (1987−2010)
- John Bray − bass guitar, keyboards (1991−2010)
- Rodney Holder − drums (1988−2010)
- Roy Torkington − guitar (1992−2010)

Former members

- Andrew Hall − drums (1987−88)
- Andrew Meredith − guitar (1990−92)
- James Preece − bass guitar (1989−91)
- Scott Chivers − bass guitar (1987−89)
- Murray Neill − vocals (1987−88)
- Nick Paddon-Row − drums (1987)
- Nick Wall − live samples (2003−2008)

Timeline

== Discography ==
=== Albums ===
- Jar of Kingdom (1993)
- Lunasphere (1995)
- Spiritech (1997)
- Organasm (2000)
- Austral Alien (2003)
- Tripsis (2007)

=== Demos and EPs ===
- "Eternal Wedlock" (1987)
- "Demo '90" (1990)
- "Demo '91" (1991)
- "Promo 94" (1994)
- "Eve of the War" (1998)
- "Promo 99" (1999)

=== Compilations ===
- Promoters of the Third World War - A Tribute to Venom (1997)
- Jar of Kingdom Re-Release 99 (1999)
- Embryonics (2005)

== See also ==
- Australian heavy metal
