= Jar of Kingdom =

Studio album by Alchemist
- Released: October 1993
- Recorded: February 1993
- Studio: Powerhouse Studios, Sydney
- Genre: Progressive metal, avant-garde metal, death metal
- Length: 44:46
- Label: Lethal
- Producer: Brett Stanton

Alchemist chronology
| Jar of Kingdom (1993) | Lunasphere (1995) |

Alternative cover
- 1999 Thrust re-release cover

Professional ratings
Review scores
| Source | Rating |
|---|---|
| AllMusic | 2.5/5 stars |

Jar of Kingdom is the debut album by Australian progressive metal band Alchemist. The band recorded the album after receiving a record contract in the mail from Austrian label Lethal Records and was released by that company in October 1993. During the recording of the first track "Abstraction", vocalist Adam Agius damaged his voice, thus resulting in the raw vocal sound on the rest of the album. The name "Jar of Kingdom" was inspired by a comment by television personality and entertainer Graham Kennedy during a comedy skit, in which he described a vial of pig semen as a "jar of kingdom". Jar of Kingdom featured early experiments with synthesisers, acoustic guitars and samples: "Whale" includes the sample of a humpback whale song. All tracks from this album except "Wandering and Wondering" and "Whale" later appeared on the Embryonics compilation.

The album was dedicated to the memory of John Munns and David Carter.

In 1999, Jar of Kingdom was remastered and re-released by Thrust and distributed by Shock Records in Australia. The album was offered to the label by the band in order for them to be released from their contract to enable them to seek international distribution with other companies. This re-released version was a compilation of the original album together with Alchemist's demo of 1991.

== Track listing ==
All tracks are written by Alchemist

| No. | Title | Length |
|---|---|---|
| 1. | "Abstraction" | 4:45 |
| 2. | "Shell" | 4:12 |
| 3. | "Purple" | 4:47 |
| 4. | "Jar of Kingdom" | 5:59 |
| 5. | "Wandering and Wondering" | 3:44 |
| 6. | "Found" | 1:28 |
| 7. | "Enhancing Enigma" | 5:15 |
| 8. | "Whale" | 1:11 |
| 9. | "Brumal: A View From Pluto" | 5:40 |
| 10. | "Worlds Within Worlds" | 7:45 |

Re-release bonus tracks from 1991 demo

| No. | Title | Length |
|---|---|---|
| 11. | "Enhancing Enigma" |
| 12. | "Escapism" |
| 13. | "Imagination Flower" |
| 14. | "Womb Syndrome" |

== Credits ==
=== Band members ===
- Adam Agius − vocals, guitar
- Rodney Holder − drums, triangle on tracks 4 and 8
- John Bray − bass guitar
- Roy Torkington − guitar, artwork, layout and design
- Andrew Meredith – guitar (demo tracks only)

=== Guest musicians ===
- Michelle Klemke − female vocals on tracks 2, 6, and 10

=== Production ===
- Mixed at Rich Music Studios, Sydney, Australia in February 1993
- Engineered by Brett Stanton
- Produced by Alchemist and Brett Stanton
- Band photos by Eddie
- Cover artwork and computer graphics by Christian Ruff
- Booklet design by Michael Piesch
