= Deep Blue Orchestra =

The Deep Blue Orchestra, based in Australia, is a Brisbane based musical group which combines an orchestra with electronic music, visual projections and choreography.

Deep Blue was established in 2004 by Prof. Andy Arthurs from QUT and Darren Clark. The group has been described as challenging orchestral musical culture through incorporating promotional techniques used in popular music, and including multimedia elements in performance.

The repertoire of Deep Blue includes standard orchestral repertoire, popular music adapted for orchestra, 20th century classical music, and music commissioned for the group.

Deep Blue claim that their intention is "to be more an experience and a new way of presenting orchestral music than a performance" through its use of visual and lighting, performer interaction, and repertoire. Non-traditional elements of their orchestral playing include players performing all music by memory, no conductor, and interactive requests from the audience via SMS messaging.

Deep Blue have established a youth education program called Young Blue, where school students get the opportunity to play with the group on stage.

Deep Blue have performed in most major Australian cities.
