= Guinness Stone =

Australian Electronic Musical Duo

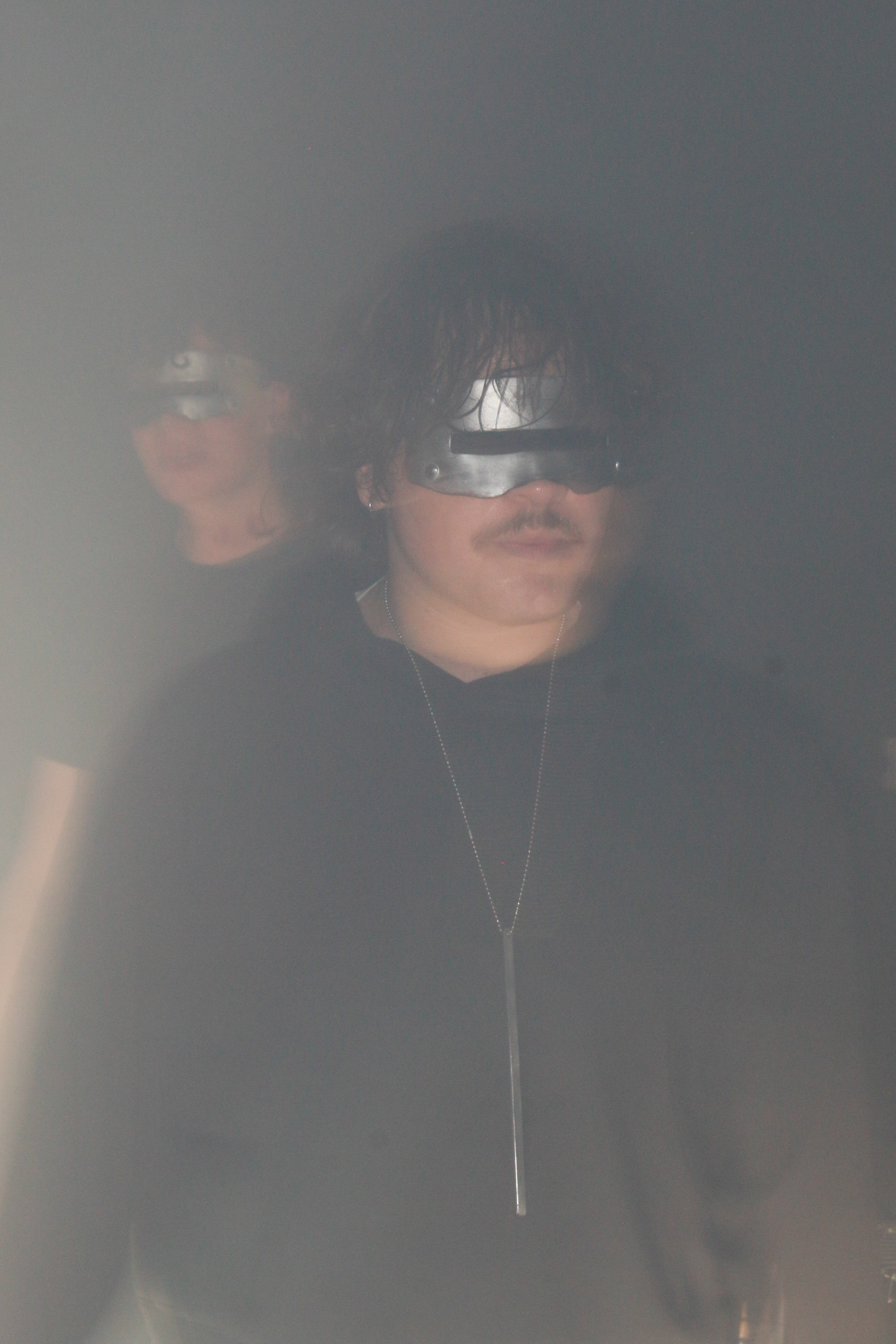
- Guinness Stone Live from the Venue. (R-L) Carter Hyam and Joseph Sault

Background information
- Origin: Canberra, Australia
- Genres: Electronic; electroclash; indie rock
- Years active: 2024-present
- Label: Guinness Stone (Independent)
- Members: Carter Hyam: Joseph Sault
- Website: https://www.guinnessstone.com

Guinness Stone are an Australian electronic and noise-pop duo from Canberra, consisting of Carter Hyam and Joseph Sault. Formed in 2024, the duo emerged through independently organised live performances before releasing the singles "jeannie and i" and "stoned", followed by their debut studio album, terminal 2 (2026).

== Biography ==
Guinness Stone was formed in Canberra in 2024 by Carter Hyam and Joseph Sault. The project originated after Hyam agreed to perform a DJ set at a house party despite having no prior DJ experience. After learning to mix music together, the pair continued performing DJ sets before developing original material and establishing Guinness Stone as a project.

Throughout 2025 and 2026, the duo built a following through independently organised performances and self-produced releases. Their music combines electronic production with elements of noise-pop, indie sleaze and experimental dance music, while their live shows incorporate programmed lighting and visual design developed by the group themselves.

In 2026, Guinness Stone released the singles "jeannie and i" and "stoned". These releases preceded the group's debut studio album, terminal 2, which was released in May 2026.

Music by Guinness Stone has received airplay on Australian community radio stations including 4ZZZ and R00ts Radio.

== Discography ==
=== Studio albums ===
Title	Album details
terminal 2	Released: May 2, 2026; Label: Self-released; Format: Digital download, streaming

=== Singles ===
Title	Year	Album
"stoned"	2026	terminal 2
"jeannie and i"	2026	terminal 2

== Tours and live performances ==
=== Headlining ===
- Guinness Stone Live at The Venue (2025)
- Guinness Stone Live at Ainslie Main Hall (2026)

=== Supporting ===
- Living Room Tour (2026) (supporting Sonic Reducer)
