= Chatterbox Records =

Australian independent record label

- Founded: 1997
- Founder: Nik Tropiano; Sebastian Chase
- Distributor(s): MGM Distribution
- Genre: Various
- Country of origin: Australia
- Location: Sydney, Australia
- Official website: Chatterbox Records

Chatterbox Records was an independent record label based in Sydney, Australia, founded in 1997 by musician Nik Tropiano and Sebastian Chase of Phantom Records. The label boasts an eclectic mixture of various genres. Its first release was a vinyl EP from Sydney electro-goth band Cult 45. Just two years later, the label came close to mainstream success when Canberra nu metal band Henry's Anger was nominated for an ARIA Award in the 'Best Rock Album' category for the album Personality Test. In 2000 Chatterbox came close again when the Sydney all-girl rock act Skulker was nominated in the 'Best Independent Release' category for its album Too Fat for Tahiti.

By now, the label had built a considerable roster of local acts that also included punk legends The Hard Ons and the progressive metal band Alchemist. Chatterbox was also courting foreign acts, one of the first to sign to the label being latter-day glam rock act Toilet Böys. After this, Chatterbox has attracted a string of independent and alternative artists from all genres and in 2006 picked up Nashville Pussy as part of its growing list of international signings. The company also had arms that handle publicity, booking and management for artists not attached to the record label.

== Current roster ==
- 1,2 Seppuku
- Blacklevel Embassy
- Brian Jonestown Massacre
- Cockfight Shootout
- Einstellung
- Adam Franklin
- Further
- Ghosts of Television
- Grand Fatal
- Laura Imbruglia
- Massappeal
- Nashville Pussy
- Nunchukka Superfly
- Peabody
- Sing-Sing
- Stockholm Syndrome
- Talons
- Todd Sparrow
- Toilet Böys
- Wog

== Former artists ==
- Alchemist
- Cult 45
- Daysend
- The Hard Ons
- Henry's Anger
- Psi.Kore
- Regular John
- Skulker
- Walk the Earth
