= Pod People (band) =

Australian doom metal band

- Origin: Canberra, Australia
- Genres: Doom metal, stoner metal, experimental metal
- Years active: 1991–present
- Label: Rise Above
- Members: Brad Nicholson (Vocals); Roy Torkington (guitar); Maggs (Drums) DD (Bass) JJ (Guitar)
- Past members: Mel Walker (Guitar); Adrian Paul; Duncan Ivan
- Website: www.podpeople.com.au

Pod People are a doom metal band from Canberra, Australia that formed in 1991. The band has recorded six releases, playing a blend of stoner and sludge traits, with lyrics on themes of cannabis in their earlier works, to topics thematically based around The Divine Comedy. The band released one EP and several demo tapes with the original line up. The founding members later left the band during 1993–1996, which drastically altered the make up and sound of the band.

The Swingin Beef and Soil EPs saw the band develop a much heavier approach blending doom and death metal influences with the more stoner rock approach of the original group.

In 2000 the band signed to High Beam Records and produced Doom Saloon which featured artwork and themes based on the Inferno chapter of Dante Aligiheri's The Divine Comedy on a fold out upside down cross released in 2001.

The album was picked up for international release by Rise Above Records and was the only Australian act on the label until fellow Canberrans Witchskull in 2018.

The band toured and featured on numerous Australian festivals such as Metal for the Brain and Overcranked as well as organising and promoting Electric Wizard's only Australian tour to date.

In 2005 the band released a split 7” with Sydney band Daredevil with artwork by The Hard-Ons' Ray Ahn that hinted at the next chapter of the Divine Comedy, Purgatorio.

2007 the band released Mons Animae Mortuorum (Mountain of the Souls of the Dead) through Australian label Goatsound records.

The band continued to tour until 2011 before taking a long break. In 2019 the band announced a return at the Sunburn Festival in Melbourne, said to become an annual doom metal festival in Australia.

Guitarist Mel Walker declined to join the band, choosing to focus on her new project The Pilots of Baalbek. Roy Torkington of Canberra band Alchemist was announced as Walker's replacement. Torkington created the artwork behind the Doom Saloon EP.

The band has announced further shows in 2020.

== History ==
Pod People began in Belconnen, Canberra, in 1991 from the then thriving local heavy music scene which moved from all ages shows to the Terrace Bar in Civic. The name was based on the creatures in the film, The Dark Crystal. It was originally a reaction against Canberra's heavy metal bands and then changed to heavier guitar-based music.

The early line-up was quite fluid, but founding members Ivan (guitar) of Precursor and Brad Nicholson (Vocals) of S.I.D. were joined by Duncan (Bass), Paul (guitar) and Adrian Basso (drums). The band built upon the momentum of some successful party shows in their home base of Havelock House and began playing regularly as well as recording their first demo, 'Just One' at 2XX Radio studios.

The band's sound was influenced by early 1990s stoner bands, Tumbleweed, but they also performed covers of bands such as Mudhoney and Black Sabbath.

The band played numerous festivals and shows around the Canberra region and in Wollongong, which also had a thriving scene at the time, home to Tumbleweed, Dawn Patrol, Proton Energy Pills and many other bands playing a similar brand of fuzzed out heavy rock. They played at the annual Indyfest in 1993 at the Asylum in Civic, and in 1995. The band was supported The Tea Party at the New Year's Eve gig at the ANU Bar in 1993.

=== 1995-2001 ===
A CD EP was recorded in Sydney and released in 1995, the band played some launch shows before the beginning of a long period of line up changes which finally solidified in 1996 with the current line up of Brad, Dave or DD (bass), Josh (also known JJ Lawhore from his 3-year stint in Blood Duster, guitar), Maggs (drums) and Mel (guitar).

Pod People solidified their line up in late 1995 with guitarist Mel Walker joining other new recruits Maggs (drums), Josh (guitar) and Dave (bass). They began writing and performing a heavier darker style than the previous line up. 1998's 'Swingin' Beef' EP sowed the seeds of the doom/stoner rock sound that lead to the 'Soil' EP in 2000 before they signed with the High Beam Music label in 2001.

=== 2001-2007 ===
The band had worked on EPs with DW Norton and together they recorded 'Doom Saloon' at Backbeach Studios in Victoria. The album was very well received and led to a number of high-profile international supports. The Backbeach studio was expensive for the self-funded band but Highbeam Records funded the band to produce the 10-track album over 9 days, including mixing. The result was the most realised combination of a style their bio at the time was touting as "stoom" or stoner doom, among others.

The band had played two supports on successive tours by English doom band Cathedral. 'Doom Saloon' was sent to Cathedral front man Lee Dorian’s doom label Rise Above Records in the UK, and then the album was secured for an international licence.

The album received extremely positive reviews worldwide, and a film clip for the opening track "Filling The Void" was added to high rotation on Australian domestic music TV.

The Australian release included artwork of a 4×3 CD fold-out cut into an upside-down cross showing an interpretation of a map of Inferno from The Divine Comedy by Dante Alighieri. This was designed by Roy Torkington of Alchemist, who later joined Pod People. The artwork is significant as the band has loosely taken the Divine Comedy as a theme for a three-album series.

In 2005 the band, frustrated by the lack of doom acts coming out to Australia, promoted Electric Wizard's first Australian national tour, touring the east coast of Australia.

=== 2007-2019 ===
The band had a hiatus whilst recording, yet maintained live shows with bands like Celtic Frost, Clutch and a slew of Australian bands like Whitehorse, Looking Glass, Clagg, Dread, Sons of the Ionian Sea, Grey Daturas and Peeping Tom.

The band then recorded in late 2007 and early 2008 largely self-financed after the High Beam Music label closed in 2004. Toyland Studios in Northcote Melbourne was the first session followed by three follow-up sessions at Goatsound Studios.

The ten-track album was recorded with the theme of Purgatory, in keeping with the themes set out on the first album. The band had previously worked with Sydney artist Glenn Smith on the Electric Wizard tour, so Smith created a painting for the album cover based on Mount Purgatory. The album is entitled Mons Animae Mortuorum, Latin for "Mountain of the souls of the Dead" and was released in 2008.

They featured at the 2009 Canberra debut of the Doomsday Festival with Looking Glass, Clagg, Agonhymn, Summonus and Space Bong. The band played at The Basement, Canberra, with Birushanah and Whitehorse in February 2010. They toured until 2011 and then went on hiatus until their return in 2019 at the Sunburn Festival in Melbourne. In lieu of Mel Walker, Roy Torkington joined the band as guitarist.

=== 2020-2025 ===
On 8 August 2020, Pod People gave the first live performance at the Canberra Theatre Centre since its shutdown for COVID-19. They were the first heavy metal band to play at the venue since Iron Maiden's 1985 concert in which fans ripped up all the seating. The show was positively received and was supported by Wretch and Lucifungus.

The band went into Goatsound studios in 2022 and 2023 to record their 3rd full length album, Oblivion. Released originally on a limited vinyl pressing by French doom label Black Farm and then self released in Australia.

The record had to be recorded twice placing a strain on some of the intra-band relationships, but a grant from Music ACT came to the rescue and allowed the band to finish the production.

On 26 April 2025, Pod People played at the Sunbun doom festival in Frankston Victoria at Singing Bird Studios. Shortly after this concert founding vocalist Brad Nicholson quit the group. Pausing to take stock the band decided to continue headlining the Essence Festival in Canberra as a 4 piece with bass player David Drynan taking core vocal duties.

=== 2026 ===
The band has played multiple shows this year co-headlining Riffs and Spliffs festival in Perth with Boris, and shows up and down the east coast preparing new material.

== Members ==
=== Current members ===
- David 'DD' Drynan – bass guitar, vocals
- Roy Torkington – electric guitar, vocals
- Damian 'Maggs' Saunders – drums, vocals
- Josh 'JJ LaWhore' Nixon – electric guitar

=== Past members ===
- 'B-Rad' Brad Nicholson – vocals
- Mel Walker - guitar
- Adrian Basso - drums
- Paul Carey - guitar
- Duncan - bass guitar
- Ivan - guitar

== Discography ==
=== Studio releases ===
Year	Title	Label
1995	Pod People	Self Release
1998	Swingin' Beef	Self Release
2000	Soil	Self Release
2001	Doom Saloon	Rise Above Records
2008	Mons Animae Mortuorum	Goatsound Records
2023	Oblivion	Black Farm / Self Release

==== Compilations ====
The song 'Goin' South' from Soil was included in the Full Metal Racket compilation.

The song 'Back to Reality' was included on Doomed & Stoned in Australia.
