= King Parrot (band) =

Australian grindcore band

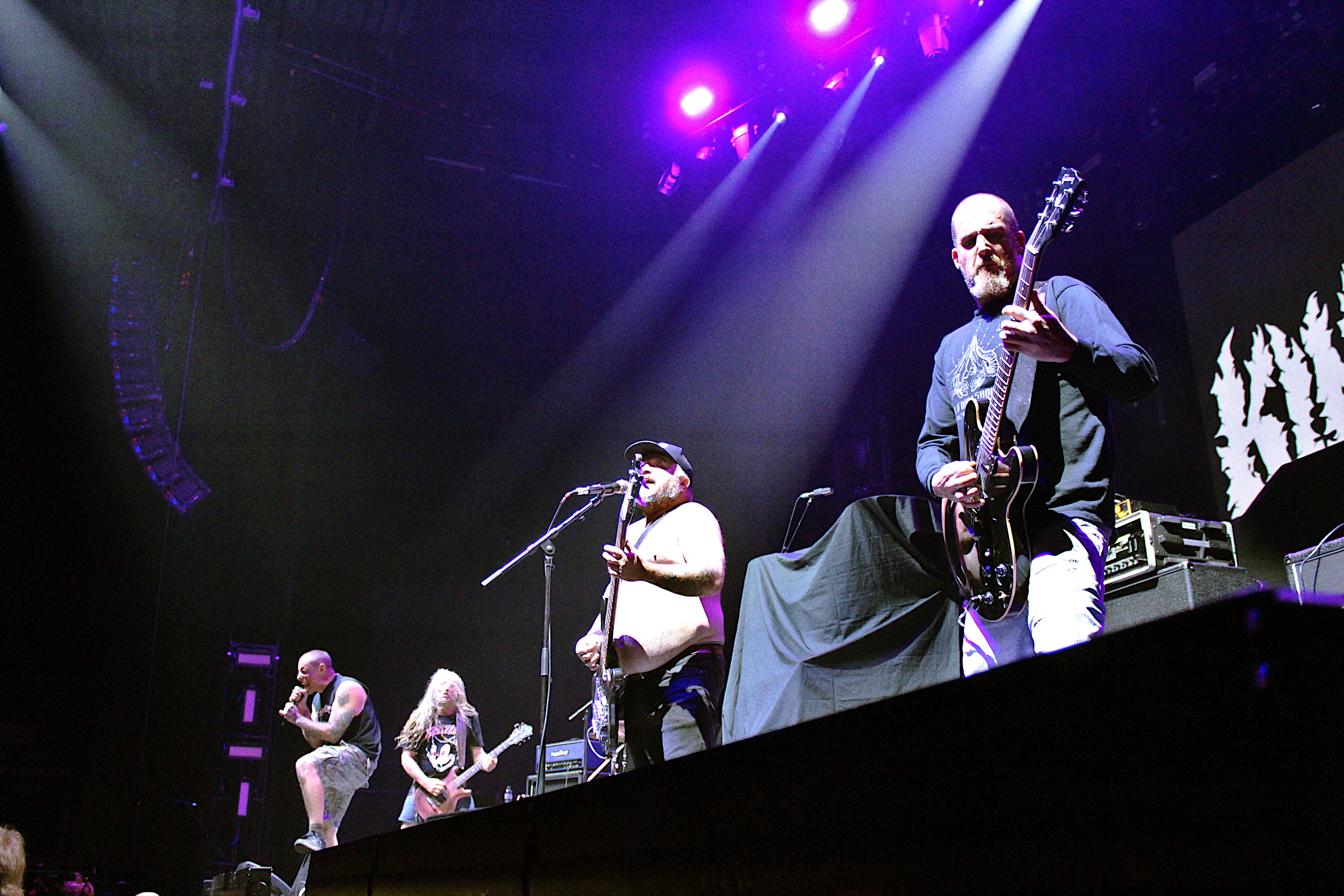
- King Parrot performing in 2025

Background information
- Origin: Melbourne, Australia
- Genres: Grindcore
- Years active: 2010–present
- Labels: Agonia, Candlelight, Housecore, Impedance
- Members: Matthew Young; Andrew Livingstone-Squires; Max Dangerfield; Derek Engemann
- Past members: Ari White; Wayne Slattery; Ed Lacey; Mat Rizzo; Matt "Skitz" Sanders; Todd Hansen
- Website: kingparrot.net

King Parrot are an Australian grindcore band formed in Melbourne in 2010. They have released four studio albums: Bite Your Head Off (2012), Dead Set (2015), Ugly Produce (2017) and A Young Persons' Guide to King Parrot (2025).

== History ==
King Parrot formed in Melbourne in 2010 with the original line-up of lead vocalist Matt Young, lead guitarist Ari White, bassist Wayne Slattery, drummer Matt Rizzo, and rhythm guitarist Ed Lacey. White, Rizzo and Lacey had come directly from their previous band Watchdog Discipline, Slattery was a member of Warrnambool rock band Cockfight Shootout. Lacey had also been a member of The Berzerker for several years and Rizzo was formerly with Blood Duster.

After the release of The Stench of Hardcore Pub Trash EP in 2011, Lacey left King Parrot and was replaced by Andrew Livingstone-Squires, formerly of Dreadnaught and Cemetery Urn. The group recorded and independently released their debut full-length album Bite Your Head Off in 2012, which was picked up by UK based metal label Candlelight Records in 2013 for worldwide release. Shortly after the album's release, Rizzo was replaced by Matt "Skitz" Sanders, formerly of Damaged but the band's heavy touring schedule meant he was replaced on overseas dates by Rob Brens of Alarum. King Parrot had by now established themselves as intense live act, and their unsettling sense of humour, most notably in their music video "Shit on the Liver", which was a finalist in the 2013 Australian Music Video Awards.

After extensive touring within Australia, supporting Obituary, Carcass and Thy Art Is Murder, King Parrot were invited to play a number of prominent music festivals including an appearance at the 2013 Hammersonic Jakarta International Metal Festival in Indonesia, Australia's Soundwave Festival and the 2014 SXSW in Austin, Texas, which was part of a 45-date North American tour. They later signed a management deal with Extreme Management Group in New York. Pantera and Down vocalist Phil Anselmo personally interviewed them on his Housecore Records YouTube channel.

In June 2014, at the end of their Australian tour with Carcass, it was announced that Todd Hansen, formerly of The Berzerker and Headkase, would be taking over from Sanders. In late 2014 King Parrot recorded their second album Dead Set at Anselmo's studio in Louisiana. It was released in May 2015 and peaked on the Australian albums chart at #21. Dead Set was nominated for an ARIA Award for Best Hard Rock or Heavy Metal Album that year but lost to Northlane's Node.

King Parrot toured Australia with Psycroptic and Revocation in early 2017, following which the band recorded their third album in Melbourne. Ugly Produce was released on 22 September and reached #21 on the ARIA chart. During October, the band toured the US with Superjoint and DevilDriver.

The singles "Banished, Flawed then Docile" and "Nor is Yours" - the second featuring Anselmo on vocals - were released in 2020 while the band was unable to tour due to COVID restrictions. The EP Holed Up in the Lair appeared in October of that year. A tour 10th anniversary Australian tour was postponed and rescheduled several times in 2021.

During 2023 King Parrot toured extensively throughout Australia and the US once again and in March 2024 they were the opening band at Knotfest Australia.

== Members ==
=== Current ===
- Matthew "Youngy" Young – lead vocals (2010–present)
- Andrew "Squiz" Livingstone-Squires – rhythm guitar (2011–present), lead guitar (2026–present)
- Max Dangerfield – drums (2025–present)
- Derek Engemann – bass, backing vocals (2026–present)

=== Former ===
- Ed Lacey – rhythm guitar (2010–2011)
- Matt Rizzo – drums (2010–2012)
- Matt "Skitz" Sanders – drums (2013–2014)
- Todd "Toddy" Hansen – drums (2014–2025)
- Ari "Mr. White" White – lead guitar (2010–2026)
- Wayne "Auntie Slatts" Slattery – bass, backing vocals (2010–2026)

== Discography ==
=== Studio albums ===
List of studio albums, with selected chart positions
Title	Album details	Peak chart positions
Title	Album details	AUS
Bite Your Head Off	Released: October 2012; Label: Impedance Records (IMP034); Formats: CD, digital download, LP	-
Dead Set	Released: May 2015; Label: EVP Recordings (EVP004); Formats: CD, CD+DVD, digital download, LP	21
Ugly Produce	Released: September 2017; Label: EVP Recordings (EVP012); Formats: CD, CD+DVD, digital download, LP	21
A Young Person's Guide to King Parrot	Released: June 2025; Label: Dead Serious Recordings; Formats: CD, digital download, LP, streaming	TBA

=== Extended Plays ===
List of EPs, with selected chart positions
Title	Album details	Peak chart positions
Title	Album details	AUS
The Stench of Hardcore Pub Trash	Released: September 2011; Label: Impedance Records (IMP030); Formats: CD, digital download	-
Holed Up in the Lair	Released: October 2020; Label: Dead Set Records (DS001); Formats: LP, digital download	-

== Awards and nominations ==
=== ARIA Music Awards ===
The ARIA Music Awards are a set of annual ceremonies presented by Australian Recording Industry Association (ARIA), which recognise excellence, innovation, and achievement across all genres of the music of Australia. They commenced in 1987.

Year	Nominee / work	Award	Result	Ref.
2015	Dead Set	Best Hard Rock/Heavy Metal Album	Nominated	
2018	Ugly Produce	Best Hard Rock/Heavy Metal Album	Nominated	

=== Metal Hammer Golden Gods Awards ===
Year	Nominee / work	Award	Result
2015	King Parrot	Best New Band	Nominated

=== Music Victoria Awards ===
The Music Victoria Awards are an annual awards night celebrating Victorian music. They commenced in 2006.

Year	Nominee / work	Award	Result	Ref.
2013	Bite Your Head Off	Best Heavy Album	Won	
2014	King Parrot	Best Live Band	Nominated	
2015	Dead Set	Best Heavy Album	Nominated	
2016	King Parrot	Best Live Band	Nominated	
