= Non (album) =

n0n

Studio album by The Amenta
- Released: October 20, 2008
- Recorded: 2007
- Genre: Experimental metal, industrial metal, blackened death metal
- Length: 49:05
- Label: Listenable Records
- Producer: Lachlan Mitchell, Steve Smart

The Amenta chronology
Occasus (2004)	n0n (2008)	Flesh Is Heir (2013)

Professional ratings
Review scores
Source	Rating
Allmusic	2.5/5 stars
Metal storm	Mixed

n0n is the second studio album by industrial/experimental metal band the Amenta. It was released in 2008, and coincided with a national tour. Nergal (Behemoth), Alex Pope (Ruins) and Alice Daquet (Sir Alice) all make guest appearances on this album.

== Track listing ==
1. "On" - 0:44
2. "Junky" - 4:57
3. "Vermin" - 4:03
4. "Entropy" - 1:45
5. "Slave" - 5:12
6. "Whore" - 4:55
7. "Spine" - 4:08
8. "Skin" - 3:25
9. "Dirt" - 5:53
10. "Atrophy" - 1:48
11. "Cancer" - 5:22
12. "Rape" - 6:53

== Credits ==
=== Personnel ===
- Jarrod Krafczyk - vocals
- Erik Miehs - guitar (all tracks), bass guitar (tracks 1–7, 9–12)
- Timothy Pope - keyboards, samples
- Dave Haley - drums (tracks 1–7, 9–12)

=== Additional personnel ===
- Nick Readh - drums (track 8)
- Adam 'Nergel' Darski - vocals (track 5)
- Alex Pope - vocals (track 9)
- Alice Daquet - vocals (track 8)
- Nathan Jenkins - bass guitar (track 8)
- Nathan Wyner - vocals (track 7)

=== Production ===
- Chad Halford - additional engineer
- Lachlan Mitchell - mixing
- Steve Smart - mastering
- Sven de Caluwé - artwork, layout
