= Abramelin (band) =

Australian band

- Also known as: Acheron (1988–1994)
- Origin: Melbourne, Victoria, Australia
- Genre: Death metal
- Years active: 1988–2002, 2016–present
- Labels: Corpsegrinder, Thrust/Shock, Repulse
- Members: Simon Dower; Matt Wilcock; Rob Mollica; Dave Haley; Joe Haley
- Past members: David Abbott; Derek Ackary; Jason Black; Michael Colton; Tim Aldridge; Jason Kells; Jason Dutton; Justin Wornes; Craig Bailey; Mark Shuliga; Euan Heriot; Matt Rizzo; Matt "Skitz" Sanders; Grant Karajic; Lance Leembruggen

Abramelin are an Australian death metal band that formed as Acheron in 1988 as one of the first such groups in the country. They were formed by mainstay Simon Dower on lead vocals, who was joined by long-term members Tim Aldridge on guitar, bass guitar, Rob "Wog" Mollica on guitar, bass guitar and Matt Wilcock on guitars. Abramelin were a main influence on the development of Australian heavy metal music in the early 1990s. They changed their name in 1994 to avoid confusion with American group Acheron. It was derived from The Book of Abramelin (fl. 1608), which describes a mage of the same name. Members of the group have been in Blood Duster, the Berzerker, the Amenta, and Akercocke. Abramelin supported tours by Napalm Death (1995), Paradise Lost, Cathedral (March 1996) and Cradle of Filth (2001). They released two studio albums, Abramelin (1995) and Deadspeak (2000), before disbanding in 2002. Abramelin reformed in 2016 and issued two more albums, Never Enough Snuff (2020) and Sins of the Father (2024).

== Acheron ==
Abramelin formed in Melbourne in 1988 under the name Acheron as a death metal group with David Abbott on guitars, Derek Ackary on bass guitar, Jason Black on guitars, Michael Colton on drums and Simon Dower on lead vocals. Tim Aldridge replaced Black and the band recorded a demo track, Eternal Suffering, before Jason Dutton and Justin Wornes replaced Colton and Ackary. French label Corpsegrinder Records released a three-track EP, Deprived of Afterlife, in 1991, with the line-up of Abbott on lead guitar, Aldridge on lead guitars, Dower on lead vocals, Dutton on drums, and Wornes on bass guitar.

Australian musicologist Ian McFarlane noticed their "dark, heavy sound owed much to European and American death metal groups such as Bathory, Entombed, Obituary, Therion, Immolation and General Surgery." They were a part of the early "death/grindcore/thrash metal scene" of the late 1980s to early 1990s. In September 2008, Dower told Chris Archer of Vomitose that Acheron's sound had progressed by "learning how to play our instruments and sing helped a lot. At that time we were all listening to early demos of Carnage, Entombed, Grave, Morbid Angel, etc., all of which had a definite influence on our song writing and overall sound, that and just the natural progression of the band’s direction." A track from their EP later appeared on the Dutch compilation album Appointment with Fear.

Craig Bailey replaced Dutton following the release of the EP. In 1992, after Abbott's departure, he was temporarily replaced with Jason Kells (of Australian doom band, diSEMBOWELMENT) who, in turn, was replaced with Mark Schuliga, bass player for Necrotomy. In November 1993, Acheron supported United Kingdom extreme metallers Carcass on the Australian leg of that group's Heartwork Tour: Supreme Blitz to Downunder. They also supported tours by Morbid Angel and Pungent Stench. Bailey left in 1993 and Euan Heriot replaced him.

== Renamed ==
The group found that an American black metal band had the name Acheron. Hence, inspired by The Book of Abramelin, which concerns a 14th-century alchemist-mage, they renamed themselves in 1994. Abramelin's first release under that moniker was in 1994: a four-track EP, Transgression from Acheron, after which Schuliga departed. Thrust Records, a subsidiary of Australian label Shock Records, issued their debut studio album of the same name in 1995. McFarlane felt their "sound had taken on a sludge-like heaviness only matched by the likes of Brisbane band Misery." Abramelin supported tours by Napalm Death (1995), Paradise Lost and Cathedral (March 1996). The CD was withdrawn from sale in Western Australia due to explicit lyrics dealing with sexual violence against children and necrophilia. Rob Mollica, the drummer of Melbourne death metal band Earth, joined Abramelin as a guitarist while Heriot departed to uphold commitments with two other bands he was playing drums for, Blood Duster and Fracture. Ex-Blood Duster drummer Matt Rizzo took Heriot's place for a brief stint but after the break-up of Damaged he too was replaced, by Matt "Skitz" Sanders (Sadistik Exekution).

Late in 1997, Abramelin appeared at Metal for the Brain, an Australian heavy metal festival. Spanish label Repulse Records picked up the debut for wider release but gave it almost no promotional support. Abramelin was re-released in Australia with Transgression from Acheron included, this time without a lyric sheet to avoid it being banned for a second time.

After this, Abramelin did not perform live for a few years. Their second album, Deadspeak, was originally recorded with drums by Sanders, although his tracks were later re-recorded using a drum machine. It was released in 2000 on Shock, featuring only Dower on vocals and Aldridge performing all the music. With the live line-up of Aldridge, Dower, Rizzo, Grant Karajic on bass guitar and Matt Wilcock on guitar, Abramelin supported Cradle of Filth and again played at Metal for the Brain. Following this, the group effectively disbanded. Further recording was rumoured but no new material emerged. Wilcock moved to Steel Affliction and The Berzerker, and then was with UK black/death metal band Akercocke. Rizzo again became a member of Blood Duster.

On 21 October 2013, Abramelin issued a 3× CD compilation album, Transgressing the Afterlife – The Complete Recordings 1988–2002. Kev Rowland of Metal Music Archives described its "total length is nearly four hours long! It is clearly a labour of love, and one thing that really impressed me is the quality of the sound throughout. Normally when faced with complete sets like this, much of it is of interest just for the historical context as opposed to playing this for pleasure (step forward Autopsy for example). But, even the rehearsal tracks sound as if they were recorded with a view for possible release as the sound is good and clear."

In 2016, Abramelin reformed with Dower, Aldridge, Wilcock, Mollica and Psycroptic drummer Dave Haley for some live dates. The band's third album, Never Enough Snuff, was released on May 15, 2020.

In July 2024, the band revealed the album art and track listing for their upcoming fourth album, Sins of the Father, and revealed guitarist Tim Aldridge had left the band. A month later, the band released the first single from the album, "Conflagration of the Dreamers", and revealed the album would be out on 4 October.

== Band members ==
=== Current members ===
- Simon Dower – vocals (1988–2002, 2016–present)
- Rob "Wog" Mollica – bass (2016–present), guitars (1994–1998)
- Matt Wilcock – guitars (2000–2002, 2016–present)
- Dave Haley – drums (2016–present)
- Joe Haley – guitars (2024–present)

=== Former members ===
- Jason Black – guitars (1988–1989)
- Derek Ackary – bass (1988–1990)
- David Abbott – guitars (1988–1991)
- Michael Colton – drums (1988–1991)
- Tim Aldridge – guitars (1989–2002, 2016–2024), bass (1999–2000)
- Jason Kells – guitars (1989–1990)
- Justin Warnes – bass (1990–1999)
- Jason Dutton – drums (1990–1991)
- Craig Bailey – drums (1991–1994)
- Mark Shuliga – guitars (1992–1994)
- Euan Heriot – drums (1994–1996)
- Matt Rizzo – drums (1996–1998, 2000–2001)
- Matt "Skitz" Sanders – drums (1998–1999)
- Grant Karajic – bass (2000–2002)
- Lance Lembrin – drums (2001–2002)

== Discography ==
=== Studio albums ===
- Abramelin (1995)
- Deadspeak (2000)
- Never Enough Snuff (2020)
- Sins of the Father (2024)

=== EPs ===
- Deprived of Afterlife (1991)
- Transgression from Acheron (1994)

=== Compilations ===
- Transgressing the Afterlife – The Complete Recordings 1988–2002 (21 October 2013)

=== Demos ===
- Eternal Suffering (1990)
- Promo 1992 (1992)
