= Blood Duster (disambiguation) =

Blood Duster may refer to:

- Blood Duster, a deathgrind/sludge metal/stoner rock band from Melbourne, Australia
- "Blood Duster", a song by John Zorn from the 1989 album Naked City
- Blood Duster (album)
