= Abramelin =

Abramelin may refer to:

- The Book of Abramelin, a 1458 book by Abraham of Worms
  - Abramelin oil, an anointing oil described in the book
- Abramelin (band), an Australian death metal band
  - Abramelin (album), the band's 1995 self-titled debut album
