= Terrorust =

Australian deathgrind band

- Origin: Melbourne, Victoria, Australia
- Genres: Death metal, grindcore
- Years active: 2006–2009
- Members: Matt "Skitz" Sanders; Dan O'Grady; Dav Byrne; Matt Storma; Steve Watts
- Past members: Jamie Ludbrook; Dave Howells; Andrew Gillon; Dan Colomb
- Website: www.terrorust.com

Terrorust were an Australian deathgrind band from Melbourne, Australia, whose most prominent member is drummer Matt Sanders. The group recorded a self-released album.

The band was formed in early 2006 by Sanders and singer Jamie Ludbrook with the intention of reforming Damaged, a grind and death band that was popular on the domestic scene during the 1990s, releasing three albums and enduring periods of instability and turmoil. Recruiting guitarist Dan "Fanza" O'Grady and contrabassist Dav Byrne, Sanders and Ludbrook chose the name Terrorust instead and began work on a CD. Insisting on complete independence, the band recorded, produced, and pressed the album itself. Post Mortal Archives was released in mid-2006 in a limited pressing of 1000 hand-numbered copies. The album featured guest contributions from members of Blood Duster, Fuck... I'm Dead and Bestial Warlust.

Shortly after the album release, guitarist Dave Howells returned to the lineup after fall out during writing. Howells' contribution to the album was the first riff of the song "Post Mortal Archives". Terrorust made its first major live appearance at the Festival of the Dead in Sydney, headlined by Nevermore. Howells quit the band the night before. The group toured with Deicide in early 2007, and Andrew Gillon, formerly of Abominator, stepped in. After this tour, Ludbrook left the band. Matt Storma had provided backing vocals on the album and was brought in as Ludbrook's replacement. In May, the group appeared on some shows on a tour by Nile and Decapitated, followed by a show with Celtic Frost in June, with Dan Colomb having replaced Gillon. In early 2008, Colomb's place was taken by Steve Watts, formerly of the Wagga Wagga thrash band Manticore, which released two EPs in the late 1990s.

In early July 2008, Matt Skitz toured Europe as the drummer with Stephen O'Malley, Oren Ambarchi, and Attila Csihar's Gravetemple before returning to Australia for Terrorust's national tour with Dismember later that month. In October, the band supported Pig Destroyer and Carcass. Terrorust folded in 2009, with three members going on to form Insidious Torture.

== Line-up ==
- Dav Byrne - bass (2006-2009)
- Matthew Sanders - drums (2006-2009)
- Daniel O'Grady - guitar (2006-2009)
- Steve Watts - guitar (2007-2009)
- Matt Stormer - vocals (2007-2009)

=== Past members ===
- David Howells - guitar (2006)
- James Ludbrooke - vocals (2006-2007)
- Andrew Gillon - guitar (2006-2007)
- Daniel Colomb - guitar (2007)

== Discography ==
- Post Mortal Archives (2006)
