= Deströyer 666 =

Australian extreme metal band

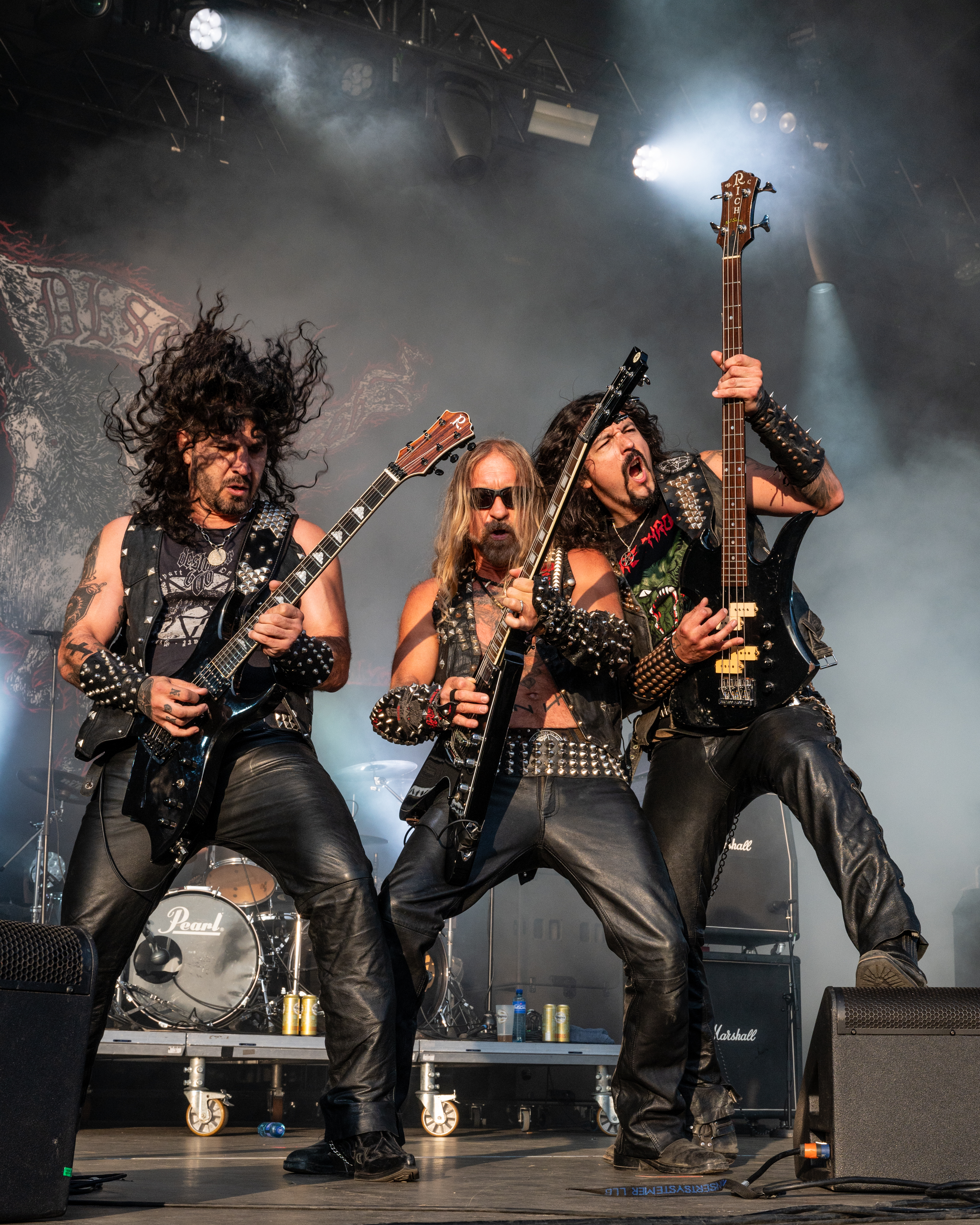
- Deströyer 666 performing at Midgardsblot in 2024

Background information
- Origin: Melbourne, Victoria, Australia
- Genres: Black metal, thrash metal
- Years active: 1994–present
- Labels: Modern Invasion, Merciless, The Ajna Offensive, Season of Mist, Iron Pegasus
- Members: K. K. Warslut; Felipe Plaza; Kev Desecrator
- Past members: Shrapnel; Mersus; Matt Razor; Perracide; R.C.
- Website: destroyer666.uk

Deströyer 666 are an Australian black metal and thrash metal band formed in 1994 by vocalist and guitarist K. K. Warslut. The group originated in Melbourne, and by 2001, had relocated to Europe. They have released six studio albums. Deströyer 666's lyrics deal with blasphemy, nihilism, Nietzsche and war.

== History ==
K. K. Warslut formed Deströyer 666 following his departure from black metal band Bestial Warlust. The project was a solo venture that developed into a black-death-thrash metal band in 1994 in Melbourne. The group's debut EP, Violence is the Prince of this World, featured Warslut on guitar, bass and vocals, with Matt Skitz (a.k.a. Matt Sanders) from Damaged and Criss Volcano from Abominator on drums. The song "The Eternal Glory of War" was later re-recorded for their 2000 album Phoenix Rising.

Following their debut release, Deströyer 666 had a line-up of Warslut, bassist Bullet Eater (a.k.a. Phil Gresik, ex-Bestial Warlust, Hobbs' Angel of Death, Mass Confusion), Gospel of the Horns' drummer Howitzer, and guitarist Shrapnel. They recorded the group's first studio album, Unchain the Wolves (1997). Soon after, Howitzer was replaced with Deceiver, and during 1999, the band recorded Phoenix Rising, though it was not released until more than a year later. K. K. Warslut joined neo-Nazi metal musicians Scott McGuinness of Fortress and Nigel Brown of No Remorse to form the band Raven's Wing, which released the album Through the Looking Glass in 1997.

During 2000, Deströyer 666 toured Europe extensively. Dutch drummer Erich de Windt of Sinister and Prostitute Disfigurement joined the band after the recording of the EP King of Kings. Gresik left to be replaced by Simon Berserker. Phoenix Rising was released by Season of Mist in November. De Windt was replaced by German drummer Mersus in 2001 and Deströyer 666 toured through Europe again with Immolation and Deranged, after which the band left Australia to relocate to Europe. Warslut settled in Eindhoven in the Netherlands and Shrapnel began living in London.

The 2002 album Cold Steel... for an Iron Age featured a cover art that the band has since disavowed, claiming they never approved it. A reissue of the album was scheduled for late 2005 but as of May 2009, it had not appeared. It is supposed to feature all new artwork as well as bonus songs.

The next album, Defiance, was released in June 2009. It is their first album where none of the music was composed by Warslut, whereas he has concentrated on the lyrics as usual with the music composed by Shrapnel and Matt Razor. The album was well received by both fans and critics to keep Deströyer 666 well in the bracket of the cult act they have become.

In 2010, the group released a compilation album, To the Devil His Due, which contains all of the tracks previously available only on 7" vinyl EPs.

In August 2012, it was announced that Shrapnel left the band for personal reasons.

Deströyer 666 released their fifth studio album, Wildfire, on 26 February 2016.

On 2 December 2022, the group released their sixth studio album, Never Surrender. It was promoted by the single "Guillotine", released that September, whose music video featured footage from anti-lockdown protests that had taken place in their home country.

=== Notable tours and shows ===
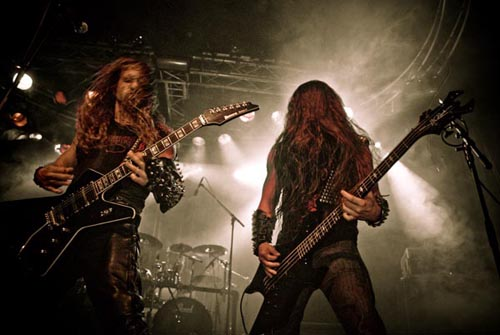
Live at Hole in the Sky, Bergen Metal Fest 2007

In 2003, the group undertook an Australian tour that year that culminated in a headlining appearance at the Metal for the Brain festival. Their first North American tour occurred during September and October 2006.

Starting from the first of January 2010, Deströyer 666 returned to their homeland in Australia, first playing Screamfest and then extensively touring the country, including Tasmania. They had not played the continent since 2004.

2010 saw further touring and live appearances. They were highlighted at Norway's Inferno Festival in March, followed by a US tour alongside Enthroned, and a European tour with Watain.

In 2011, they were scheduled to tour with German thrash band Destruction in the United States. However, due to unforeseen circumstances they had to drop out of the tour.

=== Controversy ===
Deströyer 666, particularly lead singer K. K. Warslut, have espoused racist, Islamophobic, misogynistic, and homophobic messages at their concerts. Warslut said that Muslims were "invading” performing in Germany in 2012. During a show at New York City's Saint Vitus in 2016, he led the audience to chant "no pussies" and "no faggots" before calling an Asian attendee a "chink." While performing in Sweden in 2018, Warslut said that women participating in the MeToo movement "need a hard dick" and called them "political cunt suckers." In 2019, a planned tour of Australia and New Zealand was cancelled after the publicizing of some of these incidents. Due to the tour's close proximity to the Christchurch shooting, Anti-Defamation Commission head Dvir Abramovich criticised it.

== Members ==
=== Current ===
- K. K. Warslut – lead vocals, rhythm guitar (1994–present), lead guitar (1994–1996, 2020–present), bass (1994–1995)
- Felipe Plaza – bass, backing vocals (2015–present)
- Kev Desecrator – drums (2020–present, live 2017, 2018–2020)
- Bez — lead guitar (2022–present)

=== Former ===
- Shrapnel – lead guitar (1996–2012)
- Bullet Eater – bass (1995–1999)
- Simon Berserker – bass (2000–2003)
- Matt Razor – bass (2004–2014)
- Chris Volcano – drums (1994–1995)
- Skitz Sanders – drums (1995)
- Ballistic 'Coz' Howitzer – drums (1996–1998)
- Deceiver – drums (1998–2000), live drums (2018)
- Eric De Windt – drums (2000–2001)
- Mersus – drums (2001–2012)
- Perracide – drums (2012–2017)
- R.C. – lead guitar (2012–2020), backing vocals (2015–2020)

== Discography ==
Studio albums

- Unchain the Wolves (1997)
- Phoenix Rising (2000)
- Cold Steel... for an Iron Age (2002)
- Defiance (2009)
- Wildfire (2016)
- Never Surrender (2022)

Extended plays

- Violence Is the Prince of This World (1995)
- Terror Abraxas (2003)
- Call of the Wild (2018)

Demo

- Six Songs with the Devil (1994)

Compilations

- To the Devil His Due (2011)

Singles

- Satanic Speed Metal (1998)
- King of Kings / Lord of the Wild (2000)
- ...of Wolves, Women & War (2002)
