= Skitz =

Skitz may refer to:

- DJ Skitz, a British DJ and music producer, sometimes referred to as simply Skitz
- Matt "Skitz" Sanders (born 1972), musician
- Nick Skitz, music producer
