= Cold Steel... for an Iron Age =

Studio album by Deströyer 666
- Released: June 2002
- Recorded: 6 January – 6 February 2002
- Studio: Sound Suite Studio
- Genre: Blackened thrash metal
- Label: Season of Mist

Deströyer 666 chronology
Phoenix Rising (2000)	Cold Steel... for an Iron Age (2002)	Defiance (2009)

Cold Steel... for an Iron Age is the third studio album by Australian extreme metal band Deströyer 666, released in June 2002. The album's artwork was never approved by the band; Season of Mist thought the original artwork was "too power metal", so the band was rushed to produce a new cover.

In 2018, Loudwire named Cold Steel... for an Iron Age the best blackened thrash metal album in its "best metal albums from 40 subgenres" list.

== Track listing ==
Original release
No.	Title	Length
1.	"Black City - Black Fire"	03:36
2.	"Clenched Fist"	03:48
3.	"Cold Steel..."	03:46
4.	"Sons of Perdition"	04:30
5.	"Raped"	04:08
6.	"The Calling"	03:16
7.	"Savage Pitch"	03:25
8.	"Witch Hunter"	05:19
9.	"Shadow"	03:38
Total length:		35:26

2012 remastered release
No.	Title	Length
1.	"Black City - Black Fire"	03:36
2.	"Clenched Fist"	03:48
3.	"Cold Steel..."	03:46
4.	"Sons of Perdition"	04:30
5.	"Raped"	04:08
6.	"The Calling"	03:16
7.	"Savage Pitch"	03:25
8.	"Witch Hunter"	05:19
9.	"The Fall of Shadows"	03:38
10.	"The Dragon"	05:21
Total length:		40:47
