= Thrall (metal band) =

Australian black metal band

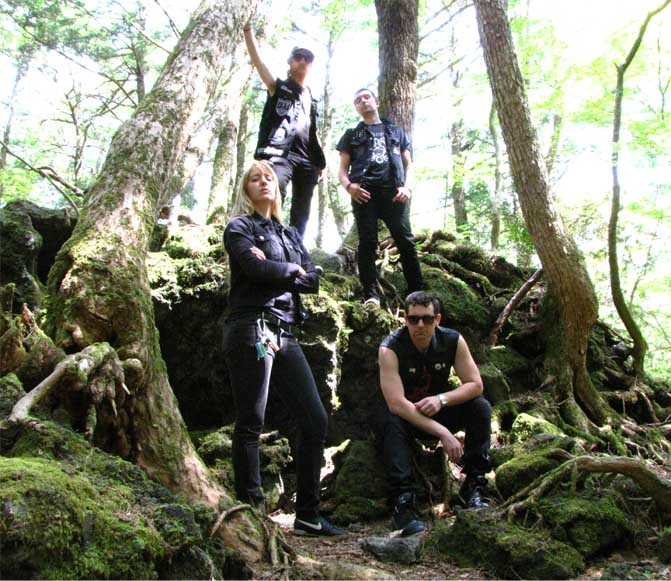

Background information
- Origin: Hobart, Tasmania, Australia
- Genres: Black metal
- Years active: 2005–2015
- Labels: Moribund Cult, Total Holocaust, Obsidian, Eisenwald
- Members: Tom Void; Emily "Em" Støy; Okkvinkalfa; Ramez Bathish
- Website: thrallofvoid.com

Thrall (formerly known as Thy Plagues) is an Australian black metal band formed in Hobart, Tasmania. They are signed to Moribund Records.

== Early work and Away from the Haunts of Men ==
Thrall began as Tom Void's solo, drum-machine black metal project in 2005. In this guise, a demo titled Wrath Eternal – a reverb-soaked, Leviathan-esque four-track recording, limited to only 20 CD-R copies – was released. Void recruited Em Støy to provide a bass accompaniment to the drum machine for live shows.

For their first album, Away from the Haunts of Men, Tom Void played all instruments, and programmed the drums. When recording the first album, the decision was made to change the band name to Thrall. The album featured guest vocals by Alex Pope from Ruins and Trent Griggs, the studio engineer and one-man black metal band Throes. In return, Void contributed vocals to the Ruins album Cauldron The album was released on Total Holocaust Records (Sweden) in June 2010 in Europe in a lavish, silver-foiled digi-pack edition limited to 500 copies. Later a North American edition was released by Moribund Records (USA), with an enhanced CD featuring a film clip made by Janssen Herr (a fellow Tasmanian residing in Sweden). Reviews noted the "dark, atmospheric" feel of the album, Void's throat-butchering singing style, and the varied feels and paces of the songs.

Void and Støy relocated to Osaka, Japan, in 2008, while the first album was being mixed. Støy moved to drums and the band recruited a live bass player, Rob Crompton, to enable Thrall to make the switch from studio band to a live band. Void and Støy also experimented with a two-piece line up at several shows.

== Vermin to the Earth ==
Vermin to the Earth featured Void on guitar and bass, and Støy on drums, with vocals provided by both members. The second album was released simultaneously on 25 October 2011 by Moribund Records (USA) and Obsidian Records (Australia). Vermin to the Earth has been described as "desolate," "mid-paced" and "extinction crazed." During the final months of living in Japan, Void and Støy began composing Thrall's third album, Aokigahara Jukai.

Upon returning to Tasmania in 2010, Void and Støy recruited Leigh Ritson (ex-Disseminate) to play bass for their Australian line up. Three months after returning to Tasmania, Void and Støy relocated to Melbourne and recruited Ramez Bathish (ex-ABC Weapons and Whitehorse) into the live incarnation of Thrall to play second guitar. Thrall have played major Australian metal festivals including Armageddon Festival in Sydney, High Voltage Festival in Melbourne. Void and Støy also continued to play two-piece shows on occasion, including their New Zealand tour with Creeping in November 2010 and a Satanic baptism in 2012.

== Aokigahara Jukai ==
Thrall completed a tour of Japan in early 2013, and announced release dates for their third studio album Aokigahara Jukai on CD on Moribund Cult, and LP on Eisenwald Germany in the final months of 2013. The album is an exploration of themes relating to the eponymous Aokigahara suicide forest in Yamanashi Prefecture, Japan that Thrall visited during their Japanese tour.

Soon after the Japanese tour concluded, Thrall announced that Okkvinkalfa of Hordes of the Black Cross would replace Ritson on bass.

== Entropy ==
After Støy's mother died, Void and Støy concluded the classic Thrall line up, with Støy's final performance on the Entropy EP released through the band's bandcamp page. A short lived attempt to continue with a new live line up concluded in May 2015. Void has since announced that he will continue his music through a new project, Nieves Penitentes.

== Visual ==
Void is a distinctive visual artist, and provided all the album artwork for all the Thrall albums. He has also done artwork for Ruins, Whitehorse, Necros Manteia, Dead River Runs Dry and Regnum.

== Releases ==
- Away from the Haunts of Men (2010)
- Vermin to the Earth (2011)
- Aokigahara Jukai (2013)
- Entropy EP (2015)
