= Cunt (album) =

Studio album by Blood Duster
- Released: 19 September 2000
- Recorded: Toyland Recording Studio
- Genres: Death metal, death n roll, grindcore
- Length: 27:54
- Labels: Relapse Records, Dr Jims
- Producer: Adam Calaitzis

Blood Duster chronology
Str8 Outta Northcote (1998)	Cunt (2000)	Blood Duster (2003)

Cunt is the third full-length album by Australian grindcore band Blood Duster. Despite, or because of, its deliberately vulgar and anti-commercialist title, Cunt proved to be the band's most successful release to that point of their career, earning them high amounts of radio play, especially by Triple J, even though its title did make life difficult for the distributors and it did not make it into many shops for the same reason.

The title was not the only point of controversy about this album. The original cover, an image of a decapitated Fred Durst, drawn by Wes Benscoter, was dismissed by their label, Relapse Records, for fear of getting sued. The Australian release was issued in a plain black cover with the word "cunt" centred and printed in a small font. The cover displayed on the right greatly resembles that of American band Ween's 1994 album Chocolate and Cheese.

Cunt also saw the release of the band's first single, "Pornstorestiffi" in the form of a nu metal parody video played on Channel [V], a channel on which the band was also interviewed.

Cunt was a slight return to a more death/grind style after their Southern rock-themed release Str8 Outta Northcote. The album also features a cover of the Impetigo song "Dis-Organ-Ized", which originally featured on the tribute Wizards Of Gore, released on Razorback Records.

According to the liner notes, Cunt has 93 riffs and 2068 words, and a large amount of porn-themed audio samples from movies, mostly from Boogie Nights, Orgazmo and Australian film Idiot Box.

Tom Forget of AllMusic stated "CUNT is designed to offend, but it’s too much fun to ignore."

Cole Clark Guitars produced a guitar for them with the 'Cunt' logo across it.

== Track listing ==
1. "Untitled Hidden Pregap Track" – 8:31
2. "We Are the Word Police" – 1:12
3. "Big Fat Arse" – 1:28
4. "Another Slack Arsed Aussie Band" – 1:20
5. "Porn Store Stiffi" – 1:31
6. "Pissing Contest" – 1:00
7. "I Just Finished Sucking Off Metalheads in the Men's Urinals" – 0:38
8. "Hoochie Mumma" – 1:30
9. "I Love It When Joe Pesci Swears" – 0:53
10. "Stock Takin'" – 0:39
11. "Let's All Fuck" – 0:17
12. "A Track Suit Is Not Appropriate Metal Apparel" – 0:28
13. "The Corpse Song" – 2:17
14. "Fuck You Scene Boy" – 0:18
15. "Is Killing Clones Illegal?" – 1:05
16. "Don't Call Me Homeboy Ya' Cunt" – 1:12
17. "Spefeven" – 0:49
18. "The Object Is to Shift Some Units" – 0:58
19. "Sweet Meat" – 5:10
20. "Dis-Organ-Ized" (Impetigo cover) – 5:09
21. "I'll Be Gone" (Spectrum cover) – 1:31

== Credits ==
- Jason Fuller - bass, vocals
- Matt Rizzo - drums
- Matt Collins - guitar
- Tony Forde - vocals

== Release history ==
Region	Date	Label	Format	Catalog
Australia	2001	Dr Jims Records	CD	DRJIM 27
Australia	2001-06-13	Drug Bust Records	Vinyl	12414
North America, Europe	2001-11-13	Relapse	CD	RR 6486-2
Australia	2003	Shock	CD	27
North America, Europe	2008-04-29	Relapse	CD	RR 7006-2
Japan	2008-06-18	Relapse Japan	CD	YSCY-1111
Australia	2008	Goat Sound	Vinyl	GS-BD-08-03
