= Matt "Skitz" Sanders =

Australian drummer

Matt Sanders
- Also known as: Skitz, Blassfemuur
- Born: 19 December 1972 (age 53); Ballarat, Victoria, Australia
- Genres: Grindcore, death metal, black metal
- Occupation: Musician
- Instrument: Drums
- Years active: 1989–2025
- Website: myspace.com/mattskitz

Matt "Skitz" Sanders (born 19 December 1972) is an Australian extreme metal drummer. In 1989, he founded a "hatecore" band, Damaged. He has played with many Australian heavy metal bands including King Parrot, Blood Duster, Abramelin, Walk the Earth, Suicide Bombers, Deströyer 666 and Sadistik Exekution. In 2006 he formed Terrorust with members of previous bands.

== Early life ==
Sanders was born on 19 December 1972. He began learning to play the drums while at school in 1988.

== Career ==
In 1989, he formed Damaged, a deathgrind band in Ballarat, with Jarrod Bongiorno, Jamie Ludbrook (on bass guitar and vocals) and Paul Meddick. The group's style was described as "hatecore" by SputnikMusic's reviewer, which is a combination of "death metal, grindcore and hardcore elements". Their debut album, Do Not Spit (1993), was described by MetalBite as "based upon hatred and speed. Speed is everything to these guys, speedy guitars, speedy vocals and fucking uncontrollably hyper-based speed drumming. Matt is too fast".

Sanders provided session drumming for black, death, thrash metal band, Deströyer 666's early release, Violence Is the Prince of This World (1994). In May 1995, he joined Sadistik Exekution, a Sydney-based death metal group, and toured Europe as their drummer. In June 1996, he provided backing vocals on Blood Duster's album, Yeest. During 1996 and 1997, Sanders was a drummer for Abramelin, a Melbourne-based death metal band. He has played with many other Australian heavy metal bands, including Noir Macabre, Atomizer (guitar), Walk the Earth, Suicide Bombers, Meatpond, Funerary Pit, and Hellspawn. In March 2007, he was acknowledged by Rave Magazine as "Australia's premier metal skinsman".

After Damaged disbanded in 2004 Sanders and Ludbrook worked with ex-Superheist guitarist DW Norton. They formed Walk the Earth, which issued an EP, Rampant Calamities, in 2005. Sanders and Ludbrook then formed Terrorust in 2006 as an extreme metal band. They were joined by Dave Byrne on bass and Daniel "Fanza" O'Grady on guitar. Their debut album, Post Mortal Archives, was released mid-year and was described by The Metal Forge's Simon Milburn as "littered with bizarre, sinister soundscapes" and is "intense, vicious, diverse, insane and deadly". By 2009, Terrorust had disbanded. Sanders and O'Grady had formed Insidious Torture in late 2008 with Storma on vocals.

In June 2012, Sanders backed Kriss Hades (bandmate from Sadistik Exekution) in a performance reviewed by Brian Griffin for Loud Mag, which featured "[Sanders] in full corpse paint ... [with] a shrieking wall of sound guided by [his] precision drumming". In 2012, he joined King Parrot, replacing founding member Matt Rizzo. He toured extensively with them in Australia and internationally, until he left the band in June 2014 at the end of their Australian tour with British grindcore band Carcass. In 2024, he substituted as drummer for New Zealand speed metal band Stälker during their co-headline Australian tour with American blackened speed metal band Midnight.

2025 saw him performing his final concert in Adelaide, upon which he retired from live playing.
