= Psycroptic =

Australian metal band

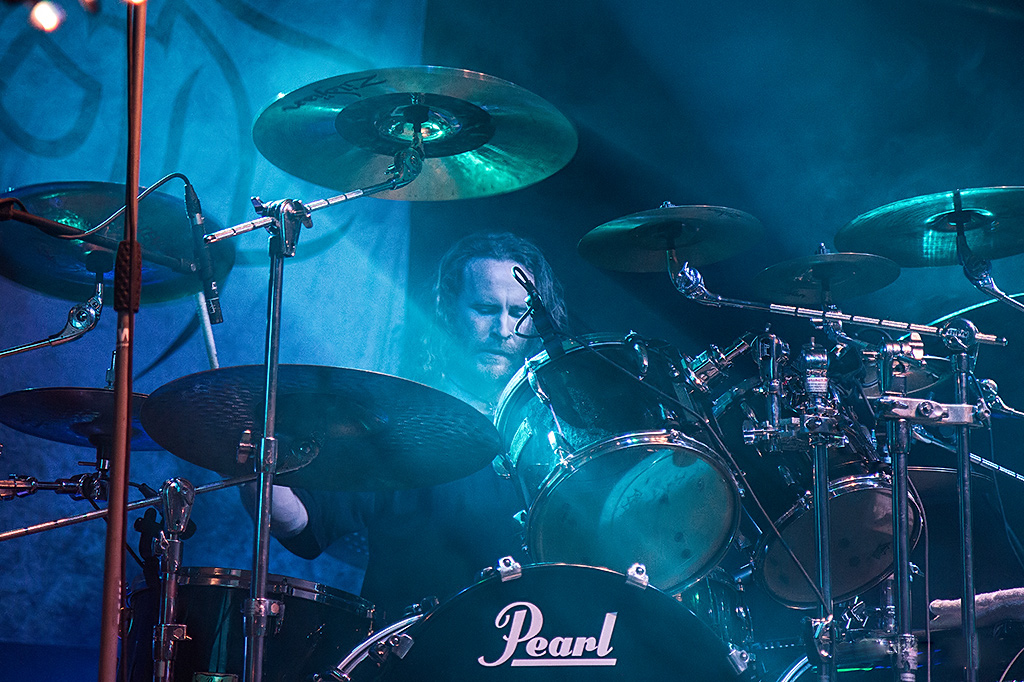
- Psycroptic - Music Hall, Geiselwind (2012)

Background information
- Origin: Hobart, Tasmania, Australia
- Genre: Technical death metal
- Years active: 1999–present
- Labels: Unique Leader; Neurotic; Willowtip; Nuclear Blast; Stomp Entertainment; Prosthetic
- Members: Dave Haley; Joe Haley; Jason Peppiatt; Todd Stern
- Past members: Matthew Chalk; Cameron Grant
- Website: psycroptic.com

Psycroptic are an Australian technical death metal band formed in Hobart, Tasmania in 1999. The Haley brothers, drummer Dave and guitarist Joe, are mainstay members. Singer Jason Peppiatt joined in 2004. In 2008, they signed to Nuclear Blast. As of August 2022, the band have released eight studio albums. They have toured Australia supporting Incantation, Decapitated, Origin and Misery Index. Psycroptic have toured Europe with Nile and Deicide. In February 2019, the band co-headlined a tour with Aversions Crown and support bands Within Destruction, Hadal Maw and Hollow World across Europe. They headlined a 2019 tour of the United States in support of the album As the Kingdom Drowns.

== History ==
=== Founding, The Isle of Disenchantment, and The Scepter of the Ancients (1999–2004) ===
Brothers Dave (drums) and Joe (guitar) Haley formed Psycroptic in Hobart in early 1999. Both were members of Disseminate, which had recorded a demo in 1998 before disbanding. The Haleys were joined by bassist Cameron Grant (ex-Magoria)and singer Matthew Chalk (ex-Hemlock), who later became a drummer with death metal act M.S.I. The band's name was randomly chosen by Chalk's friend and has no meaning. With assistance from the Tasmanian Council of the Arts, the band recorded The Isle of Disenchantment in October 2000, as a demo, but issued it as a studio album. Shortly after it was released in January 2001, the band played shows in Melbourne. In late 2001, they featured at the annual Metal for the Brain festival in Canberra for the first time, returning in 2003 and 2005.

The band recorded its second album, The Scepter of the Ancients, in 2003 for release through United States label Unique Leader. They played their first full Australian tour in support of American death metal band Incantation. The Haley brothers joined Sydney-based industrial death metal band The Amenta during this period, and recorded the album Ocassus with them. Dave Haley recorded the EP Atom and Time with Ruins, a Hobart black metal band that Alex Pope formed in 2000. He has been a member of this band since. Joe Haley has been the touring guitarist for Ruins since their a national tour with Satyricon in 2006.

=== Symbols of Failure and Ob(Servant) (2004–2011) ===
2004 was a breakthrough year for the band as they played a second Australian tour, this time with Deeds of Flesh and then headed to Europe for a wide-ranging tour with Swedish bands Dismember and Anata. However, Chalk was reluctant to tour so his friend Jason Peppiatt (ex-Born Headless) was recruited to sing vocals. On returning to Australia, Psycroptic played two legs of the Metal for the Brain in Canberra and Brisbane, and a final show in their hometown of Hobart. Following this, disharmony within the band saw Chalk leave Psycroptic, and Peppiatt replace him permanently. Since his departure from Psycroptic, Chalk has continued to play drums with M.S.I. as well as doom band called Space Raven and act in the vocal role in a number of other groups that includes Mephistopheles, playing bass in Born Headless and several other projects including the brief vocal position with Swedish band Spawn of Possession in 2009.

Psycroptic undertook a handful of Australian dates with Hate Eternal before working on their third album, Symbols of Failure (January 2006), their first for Neurotic. The release was followed by another European excursion with Nile and another Australian tour, this time with Cannibal Corpse. Work began on the follow-up to Symbols of Failure in early 2007 before some European shows with Deicide. Joe Haley collapsed after one show and suffered a seizure. He later recovered but the last few dates for the tour were cancelled. On 10 June Psycroptic featured at the Come Together Music Festival in Sydney. The Haley brothers seem to have since put their membership with The Amenta aside to concentrate on Psycroptic; however Dave Haley joined Blood Duster in September 2007.

In May 2008, Psycroptic played their first shows in New Zealand alongside Ruins. The following month it was announced that Psycroptic had been signed to Nuclear Blast Records. Shortly after, the band released their fourth studio album, entitled Ob(Servant) in October 2008. The live DVD Initiation was filmed in Melbourne and released in 2010. The band toured Australia with Decapitated, Origin and Misery Index in March 2010.

=== The Inherited Repression and Psycroptic (2012–2017) ===
Psycroptic issued their fifth album, The Inherited Repression in February 2012.

In November 2012, Psycroptic guitarist Joe Haley released a guitar tablature book for the album The Inherited Repression. Joe followed this up a year later with the release of a guitar tablature book for the album "Ob(Servant)" in October 2013.

In November 2014, Psycroptic announced via Facebook that they had signed to Prosthetic Records. The subsequent self-titled Psycroptic album was released in March 2015. They also launched a charity outreach linked to purchasing their new single, "Echoes to Come", with the proceeds distributed to saving Tasmanian devils from extinction.

=== As the Kingdom Drowns and Divine Council (2018–present) ===
As the Kingdom Drowns, Psycroptic's seventh album, was released in November 2018, with "We Were the Keepers" as the lead single.

The band's eighth album, Divine Council, was released on August 5, 2022.

Psycroptic's 2024 tour commenced on August 16th 2024 in Frankston, Victoria.

Psycroptic's ninth album, The Pulse of Annihilation, released on July 17, 2026.

== Current members ==
- Dave Haley – drums (1999–present)
- Joe Haley – guitars (1999–present)
- Jason Peppiatt – vocals (2005–present)
- Todd Stern – bass (2015–present)

=== Former members ===
- Matthew "Chalky" Chalk – vocals (1999–2005)
- Cameron Grant – bass (1999–2015)

=== Live members ===
- Zdeněk "GTboy" Šimeček – vocals (2010 North American tour)
- Samuel Guy – bass
- Lochlan Watt - vocals (2017)
- Jason Keyser – vocals (Tech Trek Europe 2023, 2024–present)

== Discography ==
- The Isle of Disenchantment (2001)
- The Scepter of the Ancients (2003)
- Symbols of Failure (2006)
- Ob (Servant) (2008)
- The Inherited Repression (2012)
- Psycroptic (2015)
- As the Kingdom Drowns (2018)
- Divine Council (2022)
- The Pulse of Annihilation (2026)
