= Psycroptic (album) =

Studio album by Psycroptic
- Released: 13 Mar 2015
- Genre: Technical death metal
- Length: 37:53
- Label: EVP Recordings / Prosthetic Records
- Producer: Joe Haley

Psycroptic chronology
The Inherited Repression (2012)	Psycroptic (2015)	As the Kingdom Drowns (2018)

Psycroptic is the eponymous sixth studio album by Australian technical death metal band Psycroptic. It was released digitally on 10 March 2015 and physically released on 13 Mar 2015 by EVP Recordings in Australia and Prosthetic Records in North America. A Deluxe Edition CD and DVD limited to 500 copies was released in Australia.

== Track listing ==
No.	Title	Length
1.	"Echoes to Come"	05:37
2.	"Ending"	04:01
3.	"A Soul Once Lost"	03:45
4.	"Cold"	04:35
5.	"Setting The Skies Ablaze"	03:31
6.	"Ideals That Won't Surrender"	03:44
7.	"Sentence Of Immortality"	04:26
8.	"The World Discarded"	03:22
9.	"Endless Wandering"	04:44
Total length:		37:53

Professional ratings
Review scores
Source	Rating
Angry Metal Guy	3/5 stars
Metal Sucks	4/5 stars
SkullsNBones	4/5 stars
Sputnik Music	2.5/5 stars
Metal Storm	7/10 stars

== Personnel ==
Psycroptic

- Cameron Grant - bass
- David Haley - drums
- Joe Haley - guitars
- Jason Peppiatt - vocals

Production and artwork

- Joe Haley - production, engineering, mixing
- Metastazis - cover artwork
- Alan Douches - mastering
