= Symbols of Failure =

Studio album by Psycroptic
- Released: February 13th, 2006; 2007 (USA)
- Genre: Technical death metal
- Length: 39:52
- Label: Neurotic Records; Willowtip Records(USA); Stomp Entertainment(Aus & NZ)

Psycroptic chronology
The Scepter of the Ancients (2003)	Symbols of Failure (2006)	Ob(Servant) (2008)

Symbols of Failure is the third album by Psycroptic. It was released on February 13, 2006 by Neurotic Records. It is the first album to feature Jason Peppiatt on vocals, after he replaced former vocalist Matthew Chalk in 2005.

== Track listing ==
No.	Title	Length
1.	"Alpha Breed"	3:50
2.	"Missionaries of a Future to Come"	4:18
3.	"Merchants of Deceit"	5:27
4.	"Minions: The Fallen"	3:51
5.	"Repairing the Dimensional Cluster"	3:42
6.	"Epoch of the Gods"	4:44
7.	"Our Evolutionary Architecture"	4:39
8.	"An Experiment in Transience"	4:54
9.	"Cleansing a Misguided Path"	4:24
Total length:		39:52

== Personnel ==
- Jason Peppiatt - Vocals
- Joe Haley - Guitar, mixing, production
- Cameron Grant - Bass
- Dave Haley - Drums
- Par Olofsson - Artwork
