= Str8 Outta Northcote =

Studio album by Blood Duster
- Released: 3 November 1997
- Recorded: 7–9 June 1997; 5–7 July 1997
- Genre: Death 'n' roll; grindcore
- Length: 42:20
- Label: Relapse; Dr Jims/Shock
- Producer: Doug Saunders; Blood Duster

Blood Duster chronology
Yeest (1997)	Str8 Outta Northcote (1997)	Cunt (2001)

Str8 Outta Northcote is the second full-length album from Australian grindcore band Blood Duster. The title is a parody of the N.W.A album, Straight Outta Compton. Northcote is the suburb where most of the band's members lived at that time.

According to the album's liner notes, it features 69 riffs and 758 words, listed in the style of Iron Maiden’s Live After Death. Blood Duster decided to mostly abandon their grind style for this album, delivering instead some catchy Southern rock-style riffs, reminiscent of Lynyrd Skynyrd – the band even makes use of a Hammond B3 electronic organ, played by guitarist Finn Alman's mother.

The band’s good-humored offensive lyrics are also present, with the band attacking vegans, girls, hippies, punks, the music industry and even the label itself.

The album also features many audio samples from movies.

Blood Duster pay homage to Kyuss in two noticeable ways on this album. First, the back cover of the album is identical to the cover of the album "Welcome to Sky Valley" by Kyuss, except the sign has been Photoshopped to read 'Northcote 32, Springvale 20, Compton 6'. Secondly, one of the tracks on the album ends identically to the Kyuss song "Supa Scoopa and Mighty Scoop", from the same album.

== Reception ==
AllMusic's William York rated it at two-and-a-half-out-of-five stars and explained, "best described as groove-heavy Southern rock played by a death metal/grindcore band, grunting, low-in vocals and all. In between the longer songs – and that is relatively speaking, since only four of them are longer than two minutes – are a number of short, blasting grindcore tracks."

== Track listing ==
1. "Givin' Stiff to the Stiff" (Finn Allman, F McCarthy, Jason Fuller) – 1:59
2. "Hippie Kill Team" (Allman, McCarthy, Fuller) – 0:27
3. "Metal as Fuck" (Allman, McCarthy, Fuller) – 3:14
4. "I Hate Girls and Crusty Punx" (Allman, McCarthy, Fuller) – 0:17
5. "Chop-Chop" (Allman, McCarthy, Fuller) – 0:45
6. "Tittie" (Allman, McCarthy, Fuller) – 0:50
7. "Motherload" (Allman, McCarthy, Fuller) – 0:42
8. "The Meat Song [Stiffy in McDonalds]" (Allman, McCarthy, Fuller) – 1:47
9. "Death Squad" (Allman, McCarthy, Fuller) – 0:11
10. "Instrumental I" (Allman, McCarthy, Fuller) – 1:43
11. "The Simple Life" (Allman, McCarthy, Fuller) – 0:30
12. "Where Does All the Money Go When Releasing a Full Length Album" (Allman, McCarthy, Fuller) – 2:38
13. "It's Just Not Metal" (Allman, McCarthy, Fuller) – 1:59
14. "Celebrating 35% Pig Fat" (Allman, McCarthy, Fuller) – 0:38
15. "F.S.S" (Allman, McCarthy, Fuller) – 0:35
16. "Ooh Ahh" (Allman, McCarthy, Fuller) – 1:28
17. "Derek2" (Allman, McCarthy, Fuller) – 0:31
18. "Roll Call" (Allman, McCarthy, Fuller) – 2:27
19. "Shoved up Your Pisshole" (Allman, McCarthy, Fuller) – 2:14
20. "Ballad of Hoyt" (Allman, McCarthy, Fuller) – 0:33
21. "Pure Digital Silence" (Allman, McCarthy, Fuller) – 9:56
22. [untitled hidden track] – 6:56

Track listing credits:

== Credits ==
=== Band members ===
- Jason Fuller – bass, vocals
- Euan Heriot – drums
- Finn Alman – guitar, banjo, vocals on track 17
- Tony Forde – vocals

=== Guest musicians ===
- Richie Poate – guitar on track 22
- Mike F.B. – vocals on track 14
- Marlana Allman – organ on track 5

=== Guests ===
- Bucky – guest vocals on tracks 4 and 7
- Dr Jim – guest vocals on track 12
- Kate – guest vocals on track 7
- Marlana Alman – Hammond B3 organ on track 5
- Mike F.B. – guest vocals on track 14
- Richie Poate – guitar at end of track 22
- V (Jason Vasallo) – guest vocals on track 14

=== Other credits ===
- Words and music – Jason P.C. and Fin Allman
- Artwork – Craig Westwood
- Disc art – Simon Moon'yah!
- Art direction – Jason P.C.
- Photography – Samantha Albert
