= Revelator (The Amenta album) =

Studio album by The Amenta
- Released: 19 February 2021
- Genre: Blackened death metal; atmospheric black metal; industrial death metal; gothic doom
- Length: 45:36
- Label: Debemur Morti Productions

The Amenta chronology
| Flesh Is Heir (2013) | Revelator (2021) | Plague of Locus (2023) |

Revelator is the fourth full-length album from The Amenta, released on 19 February 2021, and their first album after a seven-year hiatus.

== Track listing ==
Revelator track listing
| No. | Title | Length |
|---|---|---|
| 1. | "An Epoch Ellipsis" | 5:19 |
| 2. | "Sere Money" | 5:27 |
| 3. | "Silent Twin" | 4:17 |
| 4. | "Psoriastasis" | 3:38 |
| 5. | "Twined Towers" | 8:11 |
| 6. | "Parasight Lost" | 5:20 |
| 7. | "Wonderlost" | 2:44 |
| 8. | "Overpast" | 4:55 |
| 9. | "Parse Over" | 5:45 |
| Total length: | | 45:36 |

== Personnel ==
=== The Amenta ===
- Cain Cressall – vocals
- Erik Miehs – guitar
- Timothy Pope – keyboards, samples, programming
- Dan Quinlan – bass guitar
- David Haley – drums

=== Additional personnel ===
- Joe Haley – additional guitar (track 1)

=== Production ===
- Maor Appelbaum – mastering
- Erik Miehs – mixing
- Emanuel Rudnicki – photography
- Metastazis – artwork, layout
