= The Isle of Disenchantment =

Studio album by Psycroptic
- Released: January 2001
- Recorded: October, 2000
- Studio: Red Planet Studios
- Genre: Technical death metal
- Length: 38:52
- Label: Self-Released
- Producer: Psycroptic

Psycroptic chronology
The Isle of Disenchantment (2001)	The Scepter of the Ancients (2003)

The Isle of Disenchantment is the self-released debut album by Australian death metal band Psycroptic. It was released in August 2001.

== Track listing ==
No.	Title	Length
1.	"Carnival of Vulgarity"	4:08
2.	"The Sword of Uncreation"	4:17
3.	"Condemned by Discontent"	4:20
4.	"Netherworld Reality"	3:20
5.	"The Isle of Disenchantment"	3:23
6.	"Of Dull Eyes Borne"	5:01
7.	"Psycroptipath"	6:00
8.	"Beneath the Ground we Dwell"	2:57
9.	"The Labyrinth"	5:26
Total length:		38:52

== Personnel ==
- Matthew Chalk - Vocals
- Joe Haley - Guitar
- Cameron Grant - Bass
- Dave Haley - Drums

== Other ==
- Bill Dean - Artwork
- Stew Long - Mixed, Mastered
