= As the Kingdom Drowns =

Studio album by Psycroptic
- Released: 9 November 2018
- Genre: Technical death metal
- Length: 34:58
- Label: EVP Recordings / Prosthetic Records
- Producer: Joe Haley

Psycroptic chronology
| Psycroptic (2015) | As the Kingdom Drowns (2018) | Divine Council (2022) |

As the Kingdom Drowns is the seventh studio album by Australian technical death metal band Psycroptic. It was released on 9 November 2018 by EVP Recordings in Australia and Prosthetic Records in North America.

== Track listing ==
| No. | Title | Length |
|---|---|---|
| 1. | "We Were the Keepers" | 3:48 |
| 2. | "Frozen Gaze" | 4:06 |
| 3. | "Directive" | 3:28 |
| 4. | "Deadlands" | 3:24 |
| 5. | "As the Kingdom Drowns" | 4:27 |
| 6. | "Beyond the Black" | 3:46 |
| 7. | "Upon These Stones" | 4:53 |
| 8. | "Momentum of the Void" | 4:05 |
| 9. | "You Belong Here, Below" | 2:59 |
| Total length: | | 34:58 |

Professional ratings
Review scores
| Source | Rating |
|---|---|
| Angry Metal Guy | 4/5 stars |
| Metal Archives | 4/5 stars |
| Wall of Sound | 9/10 stars |
| Sputnik Music | 4/5 stars |
| Ghost Cult Mag | 9/10 stars |

== Personnel ==
Psycroptic

- Todd Stern – bass
- David Haley – drums
- Joe Haley – guitars
- Jason Peppiatt – vocals
- Amy Wiles – additional vocals

Production and artwork

- Joe Haley – production, engineering, mixing
- Mariusz Lewandowski – cover artwork
- Sam Dishington – layout
- Will Putney – mastering
