= Aloha! Go Bananas =

Studio album by Spazzys
- Released: 2004
- Genre: Pop punk

Singles from Aloha! Go Bananas
- 1. "Paco Doesn't Love Me" Released: 2004; 2. "Hey Hey Baby" Released: 2004; 3. "My Boyfriend's Back" Released: 2005

Professional ratings
Review scores
Source	Rating
The Courier-Mail	3/5 stars
Daily Telegraph	3/5 stars
FasterLouder	favorable
Illawarra Mercury	positive
I-94 Bar	3/4 stars
Sunday Age	3/5 stars
The Sydney Morning Herald	2.5/5 stars

Aloha! Go Bananas is the debut album of the all-girl punk band Spazzys. It was released in 2004.

== Track listing ==
=== Original edition ===
1. "Zombie Girl"
2. "Surfen Bird"
3. "Sunshine Drive"
4. "Action City"
5. "Hey Hey Baby"
6. "Steal a Kiss"
7. "Paco Doesn't Love Me"
8. "Shake & Twist"
9. "My Boyfriend's Back"
10. "Cigarettes"
11. "You Left My Heart in the Garage"
12. "Zatopeks"
13. "My Car Doesn't Brake"
14. "I Wanna Cut My Hair Like Marky Ramone"

=== Japanese edition ===
1. "Zombie Girl"
2. "Surfen Bird"
3. "Sunshine Drive"
4. "Action City"
5. "Hey Hey Baby"
6. "Steal A Kiss"
7. "Paco Doesn't Love Me"
8. "Shake & Twist"
9. "My Boyfriend's Back"
10. "Cigarettes"
11. "You Left My Heart In The Garage"
12. "Zatopeks"
13. "My Car Doesn't Brake"
14. "I Wanna Cut My Hair Like Marky Ramone"
15. "Zatopeks" (Live)
16. "Shake & Twist" (Live)

== Charts ==
Chart performance for Aloha! Go Bananas
Chart (2004)	Peak position
Australian Albums (ARIA)	54
