= The Inherited Repression =

Studio album by Psycroptic
- Released: 10 February 2012
- Genre: Technical death metal
- Length: 40:49
- Label: Nuclear Blast
- Producer: Produced, engineered and mixed by Joe Haley

Psycroptic chronology
Ob(Servant) (2008)	The Inherited Repression (2012)	Psycroptic (2015)

Professional ratings
Review scores
Source	Rating
Metal Underground	4.5/5 stars
The Daily Rotation	9.4/10 stars
About.com	4.5/5 stars
Blabbermouth.net	8/10 stars
Chronicles of Chaos	7.5/10 stars

The Inherited Repression is the fifth studio album by Australian technical death metal band Psycroptic. It was released in North America on 7 February 2012 and on 10 February 2012 by Nuclear Blast Records.

== Track listing ==
No.	Title	Length
1.	"Carriers of the Plague"	6:07
2.	"Forward to Submission"	3:56
3.	"Euphorinasia"	4:54
4.	"The Throne of Kings"	4:04
5.	"Unmasking the Traitors"	3:55
6.	"Become the Cult"	4:11
7.	"From Scribe to Ashes"	3:50
8.	"Deprivation"	5:44
9.	"The Sleepers Have Awoken"	4:08
Total length:		40:49

== Personnel ==
Psycroptic

- Cameron Grant - bass
- David Haley - drums
- Joe Haley -guitars
- Jason Peppiatt - vocals

Production and artwork

- Joe Haley - production, engineering, mixing
- Rain Song Design - cover artwork
- Alan Douches - mastering
