= Plague of Locus =

Studio album by The Amenta
- Released: 19 October 2023
- Genre: Avant-garde metal; black metal; industrial death metal
- Length: 41:25
- Label: Debemur Morti Productions

The Amenta chronology
Revelator (2021)	Plague of Locus (2023)

Singles from Plague of Locus
- 1. "Plague of Locus" Released: 17 August 2023

Professional ratings
Review scores
Source	Rating
Ghost Cult Magazine	7/10

Plague of Locus is the fifth full-length album from The Amenta, released on 19 October 2023 by Debemur Morti Productions. It is a cover album "showcasing the band's many and varied influences", with two new tracks being the intro and the title track, the latter released as a single in advance.

== Track listing ==
Plague of Locus track listing
No.	Title	Original artist (year)	Length
1.	"Intro"		1:07
2.	"Sono l'Antichristo"	Diamanda Galás (1991)	3:27
3.	"Asteroid"	Killing Joke (2003)	3:27
4.	"Angry Chair"	Alice in Chains (1992)	6:31
5.	"Plague of Locus"		3:38
6.	"A Million Years"	Wolf Eyes (2006)	5:11
7.	"Crystal Lakes"	Lord Kaos (1996)	6:55
8.	"Rise"	Halo (2001)	2:44
9.	"Totem"	Nazxul (1995)	3:24
10.	"Black God"	My Dying Bride (1993)	5:01
Total length:			41:25

== Personnel ==
=== The Amenta ===
- Cain Cressall – vocals
- Erik Miehs – guitar
- Timothy Pope – keyboards, samples, programming
- Dan Quinlan – bass guitar
- David Haley – drums

=== Additional personnel ===
- Joe Haley – additional guitar (tracks 4 and 7)
- Alana Sibbison – additional vocals (track 10)

=== Production ===
- Maor Appelbaum – mastering
- Erik Miehs – mixing
- Metastazis – artwork
- Dale Harrison – design, layout
