= Ob(Servant) =

Studio album by Psycroptic
- Released: 26 September 2008 (Europe); 14 October 2008 (USA); 18 October 2008 (Aus & NZ); 28 February 2009 (Tour Edition) (Aus & NZ)
- Recorded: Red Planet Studios, Hobart, Australia
- Genre: Technical death metal
- Length: 49:49
- Label: Nuclear Blast Records; Stomp Entertainment(Aus & NZ)

Psycroptic chronology
Symbols of Failure (2006)	Ob(Servant) (2008)	The Inherited Repression (2012)

Professional ratings
Review scores
Source	Rating
AllMusic	3/5 stars
ChartAttack	4/5 stars
Terrorizer	7/10 stars

Ob(Servant) is the fourth studio album by Australian technical death metal band Psycroptic. It was released on 26 September 2008 by Nuclear Blast.

== Track listing ==
No.	Title	Length
1.	"Ob(Servant)"	3:23
2.	"A Calculated Effort"	6:30
3.	"Slaves of Nil"	6:01
4.	"The Shifting Equilibrium"	4:27
5.	"Removing the Common Bond"	6:00
6.	"Horde in Devolution"	5:21
7.	"Blood Stained Lineage"	4:54
8.	"Immortal Army of One"	5:11
9.	"Initiate"	8:01
Total length:		49:49

Tour Edition
No.	Title	Length
10.	"Behind The Crooked Cross (Slayer Cover)"
11.	"Dawn of the Angry (Morbid Angel Cover)"
12.	"A Calculated Effort" (live)
13.	"Immortal Army of One" (live)
14.	"Ob(Servant)" (live)

USA Bonus DVD
No.	Title	Length
1.	"Video Diary "Making of Ob(Servant)"
2.	"Live Footage from Amsterdam 2006"
3.	"Live Footage from New Zealand in 2008"

== Critical reception ==
Alex Henderson of AllMusic praised the band's musicianship, saying that "in fact, is a crucial part of the equation on Ob (Servant)" and "technical is definitely the operative word where Psycroptic are concerned". However, he criticised the release, stating: "the material isn't remarkable, but it is noteworthy" and defined the album with: "although not stunning, certainly doesn't suffer from a lack of musicianship or technical prowess".

== Personnel ==
- Jason Peppiatt – vocals
- Joe Haley – guitar
- Cameron Grant – bass
- Dave Haley – drums
- Logan Mader – master, mixer
- Raymond Swanland – artwork
