= The Scepter of the Ancients =

Studio album by Psycroptic
- Released: 12 May 2003
- Recorded: Red Planet Studios, Hobart, Australia, 2002
- Genre: Technical death metal
- Length: 42:56
- Label: Independent; Unique Leader Records
- Producer: Psycroptic

Psycroptic chronology
The Isle of Disenchantment (2000)	The Scepter of the Ancients (2003)	Symbols of Failure (2006)

The Scepter of the Ancients is the second album by Psycroptic. It was released in 2003 by Unique Leader.

== Track listing ==
No.	Title	Length
1.	"The Colour of Sleep"	5:06
2.	"Battling the Misery of Organon"	4:00
3.	"Lacertine Forest"	4:09
4.	"Psycrology"	4:55
5.	"Skin Coffin"	4:01
6.	"Cruelty Incarnate"	5:26
7.	"The Valley of Winds Breath and Dragons Fire"	4:58
8.	"A Planetary Discipline"	3:55
9.	"The Scepter of Jaar-Gilon"	6:31
Total length:		42:56

== Personnel ==
- Matthew Chalk – Vocals
- Joe Haley – Guitar
- Cameron Grant – Bass
- Dave Haley – Drums
