= Ruins (Australian band) =

Australian black metal band

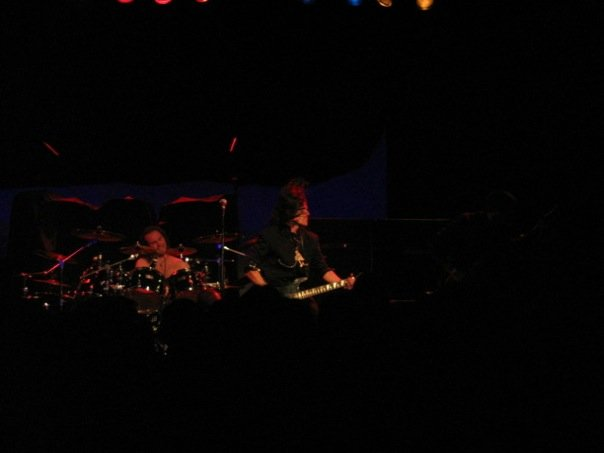
- Ruins live in Sydney supporting Immortal, 2008

Background information
- Origin: Hobart, Australia
- Genre: Black metal
- Years active: 2000–present
- Labels: Stomp, Blacktalon Media, Neurotic, Debemur Morti Productions, Moribund
- Members: Alex Pope; Dave Haley; Joe Haley; Kai Summers

Ruins is an Australian black metal band based in Hobart, Tasmania. The band was formed at some point between 2000 and 2002 by Alex Pope (formerly of Sea Scouts) and Dave Haley (The Amenta, Blood Duster and Psycroptic).

== Recording ==
Ruins began as a recording project, featuring Pope on vocals, guitar and bass, and drummer Haley. Haley has publicly asserted that, contrary to reports stating otherwise, he is not a session player. The band consists of two core recording members, with live musicians for shows, similar to Satyricon. Initial demo recordings were later deemed good enough for public consumption. Blacktalon Media released their first recording, Atom and Time, in 2004.

Live member Joe Haley engineered their debut full-length album, Spun Forth as Dark Nets. Ruins recruited live session musicians based on the response to their recordings.

== Live ==
Joe Haley and Kai Summers joined Ruins as live session members on guitar and bass, respectively. Tom Void fills in when Summers is unavailable for shows. Summers remains a full-time live member. Ruins have toured Australia and New Zealand, supporting bands like Satyricon, Celtic Frost, Immortal, Pig Destroyer, and Wolves in the Throne Room.

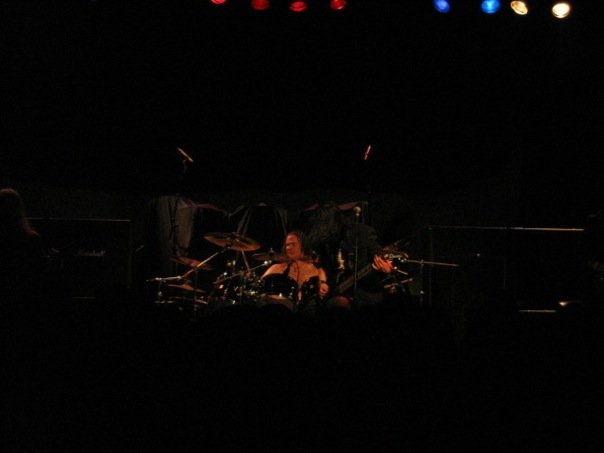
Ruins performing in 2008

== Current ==
Debemur Morti Productions released their third album, Cauldron (2008), on limited edition vinyl. Front the Final Foes, released in late 2009, was heavier and less introspective.

Pope contributed vocals to Tasmanian Moribund Records label mates Thrall's album Away from the Haunts of Men.

== Releases ==
- Atom and Time EP (2004)
- Spun Forth as Dark Nets (2005)
- Cauldron (2008)
- Front the Final Foes (2009)
- Place of No Pity (2012)

== Compilations ==
- Blacktalon Media – Legions – Opening of the Southern Gate double compilation, 2004 – featuring the Ruins track "Desolation".
- Prime Cuts – A Blaze in the Southern Skies compilation, 2007 – featuring the Ruins track "Suicidal Pulse".
