= Dave Haley =

Australian musician (born 1980)

- Born: 4 March 1980 (age 46); Hobart, Tasmania, Australia
- Genres: Death metal, black metal
- Instrument: Drums
- Years active: 1997–present

David Haley (born 4 March 1980) is an Australian musician. He is the drummer of death metal bands Psycroptic, Abramelin and Werewolves, and black metal bands Ruins and KING.

Haley previously performed for Melbourne-based grindcore band Blood Duster from 2007 for seven years, and served as a touring member of The Amenta, with whom he previously served between 2003 and 2007, from 2013 until 2015. He has also recorded with Belgian death metal band Aborted, the progressive death metal band The End of All Reason, also from Belgium, and Dubai-based thrash metal act Nervecell.

Haley formed Psycroptic in 1999 with his brother Joe, bass guitarist Cameron Grant and vocalist Matthew Chalk. Chalk was subsequently replaced by Jason Peppiatt. Previously, the Haleys were members of Disseminate. In 2003, he joined The Amenta with his brother Joe; he joined fellow Hobart musician Alex Pope in his black metal project Ruins in 2004. In 2007 Haley took over the drumming role in Blood Duster from Matt Rizzo. He joined the reformed Abramelin in 2016 and in 2014 joined the black metal band KING. He formed Werewolves in late 2019 with two ex-members of The Berzerker.

Haley has recorded eight albums with Psycroptic, four albums and an EP with Ruins, two albums with The Amenta, an EP with Blood Duster and five albums with Werewolves.

== Discography ==
=== Psycroptic ===
- The Isle of Disenchantment – (2000)
- The Scepter of the Ancients – (2003)
- Symbols of Failure – (2006)
- Ob(Servant) – (2008)
- The Inherited Repression – (2012)
- Psycroptic – (2015)
- As The Kingdom Drowns – (2018)
- Divine Council – (2022)

=== The Amenta ===
- Occasus – (2004)
- n0n – (2008)

=== King ===
- Reclaim The Darkness – (2016)
- Coldest of Cold (2019)

=== Ruins ===
- Atom and Time EP – (2004)
- Spun Forth as Dark Nets – (2005)
- Cauldron – (2008)
- Front the Final Foes – (2009)
- Place of No Pity – (2012)

=== Blood Duster ===
- SVCK EP – (2012)
- KVLT – (2012) – full-length album recorded and pressed on vinyl but deliberately destroyed before release – the album was issued but is unplayable

=== Abramelin ===
- Never Enough Snuff - (2020)

=== Werewolves ===
- The Dead Are Screaming - (2020)
- What A Time To Be Alive - (2021)
- From the Cave to Enslave - (2022)
- My Enemies Look and Sound Like Me - (2023)
- Die For Us - (2024)

=== Pestilence ===
- Obsideo – (2013)

=== Nervecell ===
- Preaching Venom – (2008)

=== Aborted ===
- Slaughter & Apparatus: A Methodical Overture – (2007)

=== The End of All Reason ===
- Artifacts – (2011)
