= Blood Duster (album) =

Studio album by Blood Duster
- Released: 6 October 2003
- Recorded: Toyland Studios, Melbourne
- Genre: Death n roll, hard rock, heavy metal, grindcore
- Length: 30:37
- Label: Season of Mist
- Producer: Jason Fuller (Jason PC)

Blood Duster chronology
Cunt (2001)	Blood Duster (2003)	Lyden Nå (2007)

Blood Duster is Blood Duster's fourth full-length album.

== Title ==
A competition was run on the band's messageboard to suggest album names, with some responses being Fucked Up by the Grace of God and Taming The Manaconda. Another suggestion was For Those About To Fuck, but this was used as the name for the first track instead.

== Composition ==
The album itself is labelled by the band as being "Psychodeathrockin'punkpimpin'icedealing gangstashit" and is an attempt to establish the genre of 'Anthemic Grind Rock'. With Blood Duster having secured an endorsement from the Black Flys sunglasses brand, Jason PC Fuller suggested in an interview with Andrew Tijs of Beat that the band had become "corporate rock whores" This album took longer to record than previous Blood Duster albums and features a number of guest appearances including Jay Dunne from 28 Days, original AC/DC singer Dave Evans and the complete line-up of Melbourne band The Spazzys. It also contains the singles DrinkFightFuck, SixSixSixteen and IWannaDoItWithADonna.

== Release ==
I Wanna Do It With a Donna is the second single taken from Blood Duster, releasing on vinyl in 2003. The 7" was released by the band themselves, on their own label B.A.F. Records, in a limited edition pressing of 1000. The record was pressed onto white vinyl, each copy being hand-numbered and coming with a poster sleeve. The single launch was held at the Tote Hotel, in Melbourne, on October 20, 2003. "I Wanna Do It With a Donna" is a song about stalking the all-female band The Donnas, a deliberate parody of The Androids' 2002 #4 Australian hit "Do It with Madonna". The track features guest vocals from Melbourne all-female band The Spazzys.

=== Censorship controversy ===
This album was surrounded by some controversy. There was originally supposed to be bonus CD-ROM material included with the album but, due to censorship rules in Australia and the distributor not putting ratings on it, this material was censored, along with several photos that were to appear in the CD booklet.

The CD-ROM was to include live footage of Blood Duster performing Kill Kill Kill, 66.6 on Your FM Dial and Derek, as well as a video of the band performing DrinkFightFuck at the single's launch. There was also a video entitled "D-Unit's Metal for the Brain 2005" that was censored because it showed certain band members taking drugs, namely cocaine. Some of the material that was supposed to be on the CD-ROM can be accessed at the band's website using the HippieKillTeam password hidden in the CD case.

Although some photos were censored in the compiling of the CD booklet, it still contains 125 small colour photos, including some featuring nudity and oral sex.

== Reception ==
Professional ratings
Review scores
Source	Rating
Allmusic	link

AllMusic's Stewart Mason reviewed the album and opined that it was "the group's most gleefully tasteless release yet, combining dead-on potshots at the mainstream punk scene (the almost Dickies-like 'IWannaDoItWithADonna'...)". Blistering's Justin Donnelly noticed that "The second single from the album comes in ‘IWannaDoItWithADonna’. With backing vocal help from The Spazzys, there's plenty of potential chart wise on offer here."

== Track listing ==
1. "Untitled Hidden Pregap Track" - 1:39
2. "For Those about to Fuck" (Fuller) - 1:38
3. "Idi" (Fuller) - 0:54
4. "Six Six Sixteen" (Fuller/Collins/Nixon) - 2:27
5. "Cock Junkie" (Fuller/Collins) - 1:07
6. "Sellout" (Fuller/Collins) - 1:21
7. "I Wanna Do It with a Donna" (Fuller/Collins) - 3:01
8. "Fruity Relationships" (Fuller/Nixon) - 1:09
9. "Heroin Punk" (Fuller/Beltsy) - 1:03
10. "Sk8er Grrl" (Fuller/Collins) - 0:26
11. "Bad Habits" (Fuller/Collins) - 1:19
12. "On the Stage" (Fuller/Nixon) - 0:51
13. "Vegan Feast" (Fuller/Beltsy) - 1:28
14. "Drink Fight Fuck" (Fuller/Collins) - 2:09
15. "Tony Goes to Court" - (skit) - 0:31
16. "On the Hunt" (Fuller/Nixon) - 1:05
17. "Current Trends" (Fuller/Collins) - 0:29
18. "Underground" (Fuller/Collins) - 0:49
19. "Drug Fiend" (Fuller) - 1:29
20. "Achin' for an 'A' Cup" (Fuller/Collins) - 0:22
21. "Dahmer The Embalmer" (Fuller/Collins) - 1:13
22. "She's a Junkie" (Fuller/Collins) - 2:46
23. "NuCorporate" (Fuller/Nixon) - 2:59

== Credits ==
- Jason Fuller - bass, vocals
- Matt Rizzo - drums
- Josh Nixon - guitar on #22
- Matt Collins - guitar, vocals
- Scott Pritchard - guitar, vocals
- Tony Forde - vocals

Guests:

- Rob Mollica - backing vocals on #13
- Mike Filth - backing vocals on #13
- Rick - backing vocals on #13
- Deanne - backing vocals on #13
- Olivia - backing vocals on #13
- Dave Evans - vocals on #5
- The Spazzys - vocals on #6
- Jay Dunne - vocals on #13
- Craig Westwood - vocals on #22

Production:

- Recorded by Adam Calaitzis at Toyland Recording Studio
- Mastered by Joseph Carra at Crystal Mastering
- Produced by Jason PC
- Art by Craig Westwood based on a design by Jason PC
- Art layout by Matt Collins
