= Flesh Is Heir =

Flesh is Heir

Studio album by The Amenta
- Released: 25 March 2013
- Genre: Experimental metal, blackened death metal, industrial metal
- Length: 45:35
- Label: Listenable Records
- Producer: Alan Douches

The Amenta chronology
N0n (2008)	Flesh is Heir (2013)	Revelator (2021)

Professional ratings
Review scores
Source	Rating
Sputnikmusic	4.2/5

Flesh Is Heir is the third full-length album from The Amenta, released March 25, 2013.

== Track listing ==
No.	Title	Length
1.	"Flesh Is Heir"	5:08
2.	"Ego Ergo Sum"	4:49
3.	"Teeth"	3:59
4.	"A Womb Tone"	2:49
5.	"Obliterate’s Prayer"	5:47
6.	"Sewer"	3:48
7.	"The Argument"	4:11
8.	"Cell"	4:49
9.	"Disintegrate"	3:06
10.	"A Palimpsest"	2:36
11.	"Tabula Rasa"	4:54
Total length:		45:35

== Credits ==
=== Personnel ===
- Cain Cressall - vocals
- Erik Miehs - guitar
- Timothy Pope - keyboards, samples, programming
- Dan Quinlan - bass guitar
- Robin Stone - drums

=== Additional personnel ===
- Melek-Tha - samples, programming (track 10)

=== Production ===
- Alan Douches - mastering
- Erik Miehs - mixing
- Jess Mathews - photography
- Mathew Vickerstaff - artwork, layout
