= Defiance (Deströyer 666 album) =

Studio album by Deströyer 666
- Released: 22 June 2009 (Europe); 14 July 2009 (USA)
- Genre: Blackened thrash metal
- Length: 41:27
- Label: Season of Mist

Deströyer 666 chronology
Terror Abraxas (2003)	Defiance (2009)

Defiance is Deströyer 666's fourth full-length studio album.

Professional ratings
Review scores
Source	Rating
Allmusic	3.5/5 stars
Blabbermouth	link
Metal Hammer	8/10 stars
Nottingham Evening Post	positive

== Track listing ==
1. Weapons of Conquest - 03:03
2. I Am Not Deceived - 04:37
3. Blood For Blood - 05:14
4. The Barricades Are Breaking - 03:38
5. A Stand Defiant - 04:46
6. The Path to Conflict - 04:37
7. A Thousand Plagues - 04:24
8. Human All Too Human - 06:04
9. A Sermon To The Dead - 05:04

== Credits ==
- K.K. Warslut - vocals, guitar
- Ian Gray - guitar
- Matt Schneemilch - bass
- Mersus - drums
