= Occasus =

Studio album by The Amenta
- Released: November 9, 2004
- Recorded: 2004
- Genre: Experimental metal, industrial metal, blackened death metal
- Length: 41:58
- Label: Listenable Records
- Producer: Lachlan Mitchell

The Amenta chronology
Occasus (2004)	n0n (2008)

Professional ratings
Review scores
Source	Rating
Allmusic	3.5/5 stars

Occasus (Latin "setting (of the sun)") is the first studio release album by industrial/experimental metal band The Amenta. The album won them the Best Metal Newcomers award for 2004 by the Australian edition of Kerrang! magazine. The album also contains multimedia content including a detailed discography, promotional photos, lyrics and songs on the downloadable ambient album "Soundtrack To A Hidden Earth". The album was re-released in 2007 with four bonus tracks, originally from the Mictlan E.P., along with the DVD 'Virus'.

== Track listing ==
1. Erebus – 4:09
2. Mictlan – 4:52
3. Zero – 4:16
4. Senium – 2:04
5. Nihil – 5:19
6. Geilt – 4:15
7. Sekem – 4:46
8. Occasus – 3:10
9. Ennea – 4:10
10. Sangre – 4:56
11. Inritus - 1:14*
12. Mictlan 2002 - 5:05*
13. Ennea 2002 - 4:09*
14. Nekuia - 1:54*
- Bonus tracks on the 2007 re-issue.

== Credits ==
=== Personnel ===
- Erik Miehs - guitar
- Timothy Pope - keyboards, samples, programming
- Mark Bevan - vocals
- Nathan Jenkins - bass guitar
- Dave Haley - drums

=== Production ===
- Lachlan Mitchell - producer, mixing, mastering
