= Abramelin (album) =

Studio album by Abramelin
- Released: 1995
- Recorded: August 1995 at Toyland Studios, Melbourne, Australia
- Genre: Death metal
- Length: 42:09
- Label: Thrust, Repulse
- Producer: Abramelin

Abramelin chronology
Abramelin (1995)	Deadspeak (2000)

Abramelin is the debut album by Australian death metal band Abramelin. It was released in 1995 by Thrust Records. Shortly after its release, the album was banned in Australia due to the highly offensive nature of the lyrics. The album was reissued by Repulse Records in October 1997 due to lack of distribution outside of Australia, and again in 1998 by Thrust Records as a double-CD which includes the Transgression from Acheron EP, and featured no lyrics in the CD booklet. It was manufactured and distributed through Shock Records.

== Track listing ==
All music is composed by Abramelin, except where noted

No.	Title	Length
1.	"Misfortune"	4:39
2.	"Grave Ideals (Nekromaniak)"	4:14
3.	"Spiritual Justice"	3:48
4.	"Humble Abode"	3:56
5.	"Stargazer (The Summoning)"	6:34
6.	"Stargazing (Stargazer II)"	4:04
7.	"Deprived of Afterlife"	6:05
8.	"Invocation"	4:54
9.	"Cantara" (Dead Can Dance cover)	3:56
Total length:		42:09

== Credits ==
Abramelin

- Simon Dower – vocals
- Tim Aldridge – guitars
- Justin Wornes – bass
- Euan Heriot – drums

Production

- Adam Calaitzis – recording
- Sally Moore – artwork, concept, image manipulation, band photos
- Andrew Halyday – triangular sculpture
