= Cauldron (Ruins album) =

Studio album by Ruins
- Released: March 1, 2008
- Genre: Black metal
- Length: 40:05
- Labels: Stomp Entertainment (Aus & NZ); Debemur Morti Productions (Europe); Moribund Records (USA)

Ruins chronology
| Spun Forth as Dark Nets (2005) | Cauldron (2008) | Front the Final Foes (2009) |

Cauldron is a 2008 album by Ruins.

Scott Alisoglu of Teeth of the Devine wrote that it "weighs in at a tonnage similar in vague respects to primitive death metal, yet is genetically related to a species called black metal".

== Track listing ==
1. "Where Time Is Left Behind (Echoes of Ghosts)" – 5:36
2. "Threshold Forms" – 4:29
3. "Cauldron" – 6:25
4. "Hanged After Being Blinded" – 6:15
5. "Genesis" – 7:04
6. "Upon These Skeletons (Bury the Dead)" – 5:57
7. "Suicidal Pulse" – 4:19
