= Damaged (band) =

Australian deathgrind band

- Origin: Ballarat, Victoria, Australia
- Genres: Deathgrind, deathcore, groove metal
- Years active: 1989–2004
- Labels: Black Hole, Rotten Records
- Past members: Matt "Skitz" Sanders; Chris Hill; James Ludbrook; Matthew Parker; Dave Saddington; Mat Silcock; Kevin Sharp; Brendan Birge; Jarrod Bongiorno; Paul Medic; Chris Wallace; Jason Maggs; Terry Vainoras; Ed Lacey

Damaged was an Australian deathgrind band from Ballarat, Victoria, active from 1989 to 2004.

== History ==
Drummer Matt "Skitz" Sanders formed the band. Mat Silcock and Chris Hill were the two original guitarists, with bass player Jason Parker and singer James Ludbrook.

The band's first demo, The Art of Destroying Life, appeared in 1992. The next year, they released their first album, Do Not Spit, on Black Hole Records. In 1994 Damaged toured with Cannibal Corpse. Silcock left Damaged in 1996, and around the same time, due to a dispute with label Black Hole Records, Damaged disbanded. Hill joined Melbourne band Discordia. Sanders toured Europe as drummer with Sadistik Exekution and played in Abramelin.

The split lasted a short time, since US label Rotten Records approached the band with a five-album deal. Reforming without Silcock, Damaged released Token Remedies Research in 1997 and finished the year with a performance at the Metal for the Brain festival. Early the following year, the band toured Australia with Entombed, but the reunion was almost cut short when Ludbrook was fired in the middle of a tour a few months later. Brendan Birge from the Melbourne death metal band Earth joined Damaged as Ludbrook's replacement after a brief stint by Chris Wallace, but found the constant tensions within the group difficult and resigned in mid-1999. Parker left and Damaged continued as a recording project, with Sanders and Hill providing a track for the all-Australian double heavy metal CD Under the Southern Cross.

Late in 1999, former Brutal Truth singer Kevin Sharp joined Damaged. In 2000, the album Purified in Pain was released, featuring bass contributions by Terry Vainoras of Melbourne death metal band Order of Chaos. With Eddy Lacey of Melbourne thrash band The Wolves filling in as the group's bass player, Damaged embarked on a national tour in December. Sharp's relationship with the band ended after this and Damaged went into hiatus for some time. Hill remained active as a member of Running With Scissors and Sanders recorded the album Lords of Eternity with his black metal band, Hellspawn.

With Parker returning to the line-up and ex-Uncle Chunk singer Dave Saddington on vocals, Damaged began playing live again in mid-2003. A short national tour was followed by supporting Sepultura's national tour. Damaged ended the year headlining Metal for the Brain.

Damaged played its final performances in January 2004. Citing a serious health condition, Sanders was unable to continue. In March 2004, Hill confirmed that Damaged had ended playing live with Sanders, but may continue recording in the future.

Shortly after ending Damaged, Sanders joined the new hardcore band Walk the Earth, which featured Ludbrook and Superheist guitarist DW Norton. After an EP and a short spate of tours that included shows with Slipknot and Mudvayne, Ludbrook left and the band folded in mid-2005. The singer quickly announced plans to reform Damaged with Sanders; however, in early 2006 the pair announced their new band would instead be called Terrorust. Terrorust has since released a full-length album, Post Mortal Archives.

== Members ==
=== Final Members ===
- Matt "Skitz" Sanders - drums (1989-2004)
- Jason "Mohawk" Parker - bass (1989–1999, 2003–2004)
- Chris "Hilly" Hill - guitar (1991-2004)
- Dave Saddington - vocals (2003–2004)

=== Past members ===
- Jarrod Bongiorno - guitar (1989)
- Paul Medic - guitar (1989)
- Matt Silcock - guitar (1989-1996)
- James Ludbrooke - vocals (1989-1999)
- Christian Wallace - vocals (1998)
- Brendan Birge - vocals (1998-1999)
- Terry Vainorus - bass (1999-2000)
- Kevin Sharp - vocals (1999-2002)

== Discography ==
Do Not Spit

- Released: 1993
- Format: Compact Disc
- Label: Black Hole (Australia)

Passive Backseat Demon Engines (EP)

- Released: 1995
- Format: Compact Disc
- Label: Black Hole (Australia)

Token Remedies Research

- Released: 1997
- Format: Compact Disc
- Label: Rotten (United States)

Purified in Pain

- Released: 2000
- Format: Compact Disc
- Label: Rotten (United States)
