= Spazzys =

Australian pop punk band

The Spazzys
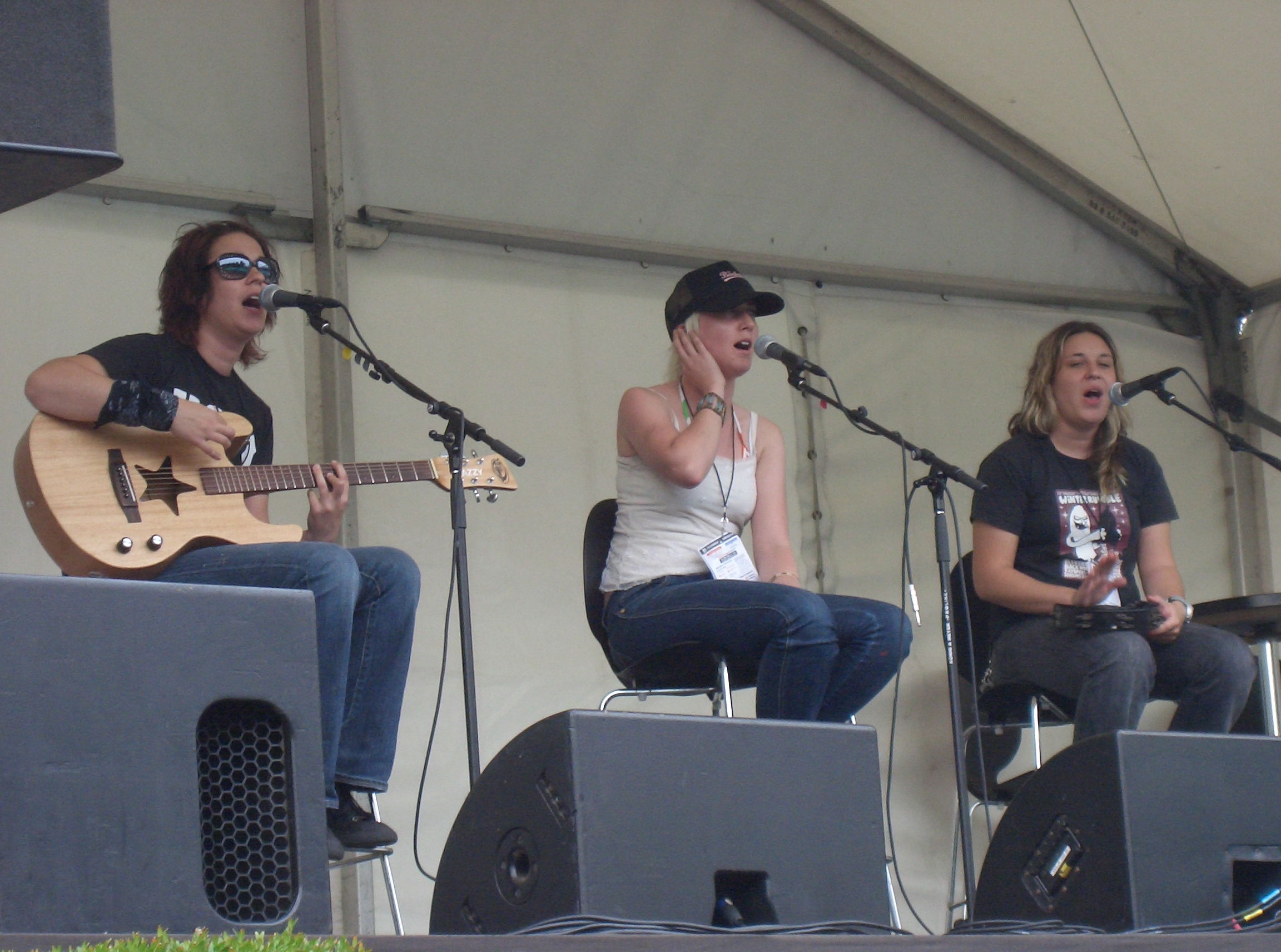
- Spazzys performing at the Australian Open in January 2006

Background information
- Origin: Melbourne, Victoria, Australia
- Genre: Pop punk
- Years active: 2000–2018
- Label: Shock
- Past members: Kat Spazzy; Lucy Spazzy; Ally Spazzy
- Website: Official website

The Spazzys were an Australian pop punk band, formed in 2000 by twins Katerina (guitar, lead vocals) and Lucy (bass, backing vocals) Ljubicic (AKA Kat and Lucy Spazzy), with their schoolmate Alice McNamara (Ally Spazzy) on drums and vocals. Their cover version of "My Boyfriend's Back" (February 2005) peaked at number 24 on the ARIA Singles Chart.

== History ==
Kat Spazzy and Lucy Spazzy are twin sisters. For Years Nine and Ten they attended Melbourne Girls' College alongside Ally Spazzy (a.k.a. Alice McNamara). The Spazzys formed in Melbourne in 2000, after Ally's 18th birthday with Kat on guitar and lead vocals; Lucy on bass guitar and vocals; and Ally on drums and vocals. One of their influences were The Ramones, and in homage they each adopted the band's name as their performance surname.

Kat recalled that initially "we couldn't play, so we just did it. I was told I was the one who would be playing guitar – I didn't know if it was serious and I didn't want to spend any money, so I borrowed a guitar, and after six months I realized that maybe we could do this." The group played their first show as a support for fellow punk band, Mach Pelican.

Their first three singles, "Paco Doesn't Love Me" (April 2004), "Hey Hey Baby" (July) and "My Boyfriend's Back" (February 2005), all charted, with the latter reaching No. 24 on the ARIA Singles Chart. At a gig at the Gaelic Club they played in May 2004 with Marky Ramone on his Australian visit, Ally made way for Ramone on the drums. Ramone also appears in their video clip for "Hey Hey Baby". By July that year the trio had supported gigs in Melbourne by visiting artists: The Buzzcocks, The Datsuns, The D4, Gerling and Blondie.

Their debut album, Aloha! Go Bananas (20 September 2004), entered the AIR independent chart at No. 1 and reached the top 60 of the ARIA Albums Chart. They received significant radio airplay – including on national youth radio station, Triple J. Their track, "Paco Doesn't Love Me", written about the drummer of an Italian punk band, Retarded, was listed at No. 75 in the 2004 Triple J Hottest 100. In 2005, Ally guest starred on the game show Spicks and Specks, and Kat appeared on RocKwiz.

By late 2006 the Spazzys had recorded their second album, Dumb Is Forever. However its release was "severely delayed by some pretty serious legal issues." Kat later told Steve Bell of The Music that the dispute with their label and management began when they were asked to record it in Los Angeles. She reflected "we didn't want to go to LA, we were tricked into going to LA – I think our managers thought it would be a cool thing to do... and I think they wanted us to record there, which is the daggiest most '80s thing in the fucking world to do."

In 2007 Ally founded a children's music workshop, Kiddy Rock, where "she goes around to kindergartens and does music classes for all the little kids... get them all fired up, and then the teachers have to come along and give them their milk and settle them down." The Spazzys have played several major music festivals: the Big Day Out in January 2007, Falls Festival, Queenscliff Music Festival, Pyramid Rock Festival. They toured in support of Australian groups: You Am I, Grinspoon, Butterfingers and Hard-Ons. They also supported international acts such The Distillers, The Hives, The 5.6.7.8's, and Marilyn Manson.

During their support of Manson for the Australasian leg of his Rape of the World Tour in October 2007, they were poorly received by some crowd members. Kat recalled "All those little Goths in the crowd were so funny! I thought they were going to raid the stage! A lot of them really, really hated us, but we came out in capes and stuff, and hopefully a few of them liked us by the end." Their biggest response was by asking the crowd for a "fuck you". The band frequently mocked the audience by announcing song titles such as: "My Parents Don't Understand Me So I'm Going to My Room to Cut Myself". Kat declared that Manson "loved us, and he was the one who asked us to do the tour."

In 2011 Kat was employed as a criminal lawyer after obtaining her Bachelor of Laws (First Class Honours) from Victoria University and Graduate Diploma of Legal Practice at Australian National University.

The Spazzys finally released Dumb Is Forever in 2011, which Graham Blackley of Beat Magazine opined "has been worth the lengthy wait." He described how the group "have clearly maintained their tight and sprightly musicianship. There are plenty of '60s tinged bubble-gum melodies and ferocious wall-shaking firepower and they still manage to diversify their sound." Dylan Stewart of The Music felt "fun and frivolous, and represents a flashback to another time... [with] a slight shift towards a poppier delivery compared to the brash punk sensibility they were then known for."

Madison Thomas, reviewing for Tone Deaf, praised the band's performance at the Tote in November 2012, saying "their set packs a punch."

In August 2021, The Age reported that McNamara had been posting Neo-Nazi and anti-lockdown propaganda using an online alias.

== Members ==
- Kat Spazzy (guitar)
- Lucy Spazzy (bass guitar)
- Ally Spazzy (drums)

All three members contributed lead and backing vocals, although Kat was the lead singer for most of their songs.

== Discography ==
=== Albums ===
List of albums, with selected chart positions
Title	Details	Peak chart positions
Title	Details	AUS
Aloha! Go Bananas	Released: 20 September 2004	54
Dumb Is Forever	Released: 2011	—

=== Extended plays ===
- I Met Her at the 7-11
- The Sunshine Drive

=== Singles ===
List of singles, with selected chart positions
Title	Year	Peak chart positions	Album
Title	Year	AUS	Album
"Paco Doesn't Love Me"	2004	65	Aloha! Go Bananas
"Hey Hey Baby"	2004	53	Aloha! Go Bananas
"My Boyfriend's Back"	2005	24	Aloha! Go Bananas
"Divorce"	2006	—	Non-album single
"Creep" / "Best Waves Ever"	2010	—	Dumb Is Forever
