= The Amenta =

Australian metal band

- Also known as: Crucible of Agony (1997–2001)
- Origin: Sydney, Australia
- Genres: Avant-garde metal, blackened death metal, industrial metal
- Years active: 1997–2013, 2020–present
- Labels: Dissident, Listenable
- Members: Mark Bevan; Timothy Pope; Erik Miehs; Matt Wilcock; David Haley
- Past members: Cain Cressall; Joe Haley; Robin Stone; Nathan Jenkins; Jarrod Krafczyk; Dale Harrison; Dan Quinlan
- Website: theamenta.com

The Amenta are an Australian extreme metal band formed in 1997 as Crucible of Agony. By 2002, the line-up was Cesium 137 (aka Mark Bevan) on lead vocals, Diazanon (Dave Haley) on drums, Ethion (Erik Miehs) on guitar, Endrin (Nathan Jenkins) on bass guitar, and Chlordane (Timothy Pope) on keyboards. In 2009, singer Cain Cressall, bassist Dan Quinlan, and drummer Robin Stone joined Miehs and Pope. The group has issued three studio albums, Occasus (2004), n0n (2008), and Flesh Is Heir (2013). The group went on hiatus in 2013, and reunited in 2020.

== History ==
The Amenta formed in 1997 in Baulkam Hills, a Sydney suburb, as Crucible of Agony. They played black metal and released two demos in 1999 under that name. They were renamed The Amenta in 2001. The following year, they self-released their first extended play, Mictlan. The line-up consisted of Cessium 137 (aka Mark Bevan, lead vocals), Scott Howard (drums), Ethion (Erik Miehs, guitar), Ben Symons (guitar) Endrin (Nathan Jenkins, bass guitar) and Chlordane (Timothy Pope, keyboards). Diazanon (Dave Haley) replaced Howard on drums.

In 2003, they signed with Listenable Records and released their debut studio album, Occasus. It was acclaimed by rock magazine, Kerrang!, where they were awarded Best Metal Newcomers for 2004. AllMusic's Eduardo Rivadavia described their sound as "a barrage of speed-riffs, crushed throat shouting, and what may or may not be programmed drums ... that recall the similarly claustrophobic crush" of Zyklon and Cryptopsy. In May 2006, the band replaced Bevan with singer Jarrod Krafczyk. They played several tours, including an appearance at the 2007 Festival of the Dead, followed by a UK tour with Akercocke and the Berzerker. Also that year, they supported Polish blackened death metal band Behemoth on their tour of Australia, and released the Virus DVD as a bonus disc with the limited re-release of Occasus/Mictlan.

In October 2008, The Amenta issued their second album, n0n. It features guest appearances from Jason Mendonca of Akercocke, Nergal of Behemoth, Alice Daquet of Sir Alice, and Alex Pope of Ruins. Alex Boniwell described the album in the magazine Terrorizer as "industrial metal for people who 'actually' like both industrial and metal". Cosmo Lee of Allmusic found the album "futuristic yet anachronistic. Its fizzy synths, brooding soundscapes, and micro-level editing employ state-of-the-art computing. But the approach is nothing new. Whenever machines and metal intertwine this tightly, the ghost of '90s industrial metal looms large". The Amenta toured Europe in January 2009 with Deicide.

They returned to Australia and began a national tour with the Berzerker, which ran from late January 2009 to late March with a tour of New Zealand. The Amenta were scheduled to perform at the Rockout Festival 2009 featuring Twisted Sister, Girlschool, and Rose Tattoo, but it was postponed and then cancelled. The group embarked on their first North American tour in November–December 2009 with Vader, Decrepit Birth, Warbringer, Augury and Success Will Write Apocalypse Across the Sky. They supported Behemoth and Job for a Cowboy for the 2010 Australian tour.

In 2011, the band released the online EP V01D, the band's first recording with new vocalist Cain Cressall. It featured re-recordings of old tracks, remixes, a cover, and a new song. The group embarked on an Australian tour with Ruins in March and April. In June, they opened for Morbid Angel and later toured Europe with Deicide, Belphegor, and Hour of Penance. In July, they toured Western Australia, playing material from their three albums. On 15 May 2012, The Amenta released the five-track EP Chokehold. In August 2012, the band's website announced the album Flesh Is Heir. The group was due to tour Europe in November and December of that year with Obituary, Macabre, and Psycroptic.

On 20 October 2013, The Amenta announced that they would cease performing live and were going on hiatus. A seven-year period of inactivity ended in November 2020, and the band planned to release a new album in early 2021.

On 19 June 2021, the band returned to the stage, performing at Hobart's winter festival Dark Mofo.

== Band members ==
=== Current members ===
- Erik Miehs (Ethion) – guitar (2002–2013, 2020–present), bass (2008)
- Timothy Pope (Chlordane) – keyboards, samples, programming (2002–2013, 2020–present)
- Mark Bevan (Cesium 137) – vocals (2002–2006, 2026-present), bass (2026-present)
- Matt Wilcock – guitar (2026-present)
- Dave Haley (Diazonon) – drums (2002–2007, 2013, 2020–present)

=== Former members ===
- Nathan Jenkins (Endrin) – bass guitar (2002–2007)
- Jarrod Krafczyk – vocals (2006–2009)
- Chad Halford – bass guitar (2008)
- Dale Harrison – bass guitar (2008–2009)
- Robin Stone – drums (2007–2013)
- Dan Quinlan – bass guitar (2009–2013, 2020–2021)
- Cain Cressall – vocals (2009–2013, 2020–2024)

=== Touring members ===
- Joe Haley – guitar (2005)
- Scott Bernasconi – guitar (2007)
- Tim Aldridge – guitar (2011)
- Ryan Huthnance – guitar (2012)
- Robin Stone – drums (2021)
- Sam Bean – bass guitar (2021–present)

Timeline

== Discography ==
=== Albums ===
- Occasus (2004)
- n0n (2008)
- Flesh Is Heir (2013)
- Revelator (2021)
- Plague of Locus (cover album) (2023)

=== Extended plays ===
- Mictlan (2002)
- V01D (2011)
- Chokehold (2012)
- Teeth (2013)
