= Blood Duster =

Australian metal band

- Origin: Melbourne, Victoria, Australia
- Genres: Grindcore; death 'n' roll; stoner rock
- Years active: 1991–2017; 2024–present
- Labels: Shock; Dr Jims; Relapse
- Members: Jason Fuller; Tony Forde; Matt Rizzo; Matt Collins; Scott Pritchard
- Past members: Dave Haley; Euan Heriot; Finn McCarthy; Troy Darlington; Andrew Brown; Shane Rout; Brad Johnson; Josh Nixon; Callum Wilson; Anthony Barry
- Website: bloodduster.com

Blood Duster are an Australian grindcore and stoner rock band from Melbourne. Their name comes from the song "Blood Duster" by John Zorn, from the 1990 album Naked City.

== History ==
=== Formation ===
Jason Fuller (aka Jason PC) (bass), Anthony Barry (vocals and guitar), and Andrew Brown (drums) formed the band in 1991. After completing their first demo, Barry resigned and Troy Darlington and Callum Wilson replaced him.

A 1992 self-released demo recording was titled Menstrual Soup. By the time the band recorded their first EP, Wilson and Darlington had been replaced with Tony Forde, Shane Rout (who later formed black metal band Abyssic Hate) and Brad Johnston.

=== Fisting the Dead (1993) ===
Fisting the Dead, the band's debut, is a grindcore EP that featured 25 tracks, released in mid-1993. According to Rosemary Overell, "They are largely credited with establishing Melbourne's gore- and porno-grindcore aesthetic". The tracks were recorded for a proposed split album on the Wild Rags label with other tracks by Impetigo and Meat Shits. The track "Derek" refers to a character played by Peter Jackson in his 1987 film Bad Taste, which was "heavily influenced by the late-'80s grindcore of such Earache label bands as Carcass and Napalm Death."

In 1996, the album was released in the US as bonus tracks on the U.S. CD issue of the group's 1995 EP Yeest, on Relapse Records and Drug Bust Records. In 2001, it was reissued on vinyl with Yeest on the B-side.

In 2005, the album was reissued as Fisting the Dead... Again on bassist Jason Fuller's label, with bonus tracks, on Goat Sounds Records.

In 2008, it was reissued on Stomp Records with Yeest, the compilation tracks, and live tracks from a gig at the Great Britain Hotel on 18 August 1993 as bonus tracks. AllMusic's Tom Forget described the 2008 version: "A noticeable splatter seems to accompany every spin of Blood Duster's mammoth reissue". He felt that it "traces the band's early-90s grind heyday, before elements of Southern and stoner rock groove seeped into their toxic sound."

=== 1995–2000 ===
In 1995, Blood Duster released the EP Yeest, which started to show some more rock leanings. The band toured Australia including Canberra in November 1995.

The band next produced 1998's Str8 Outta Northcote, which featured a bizarre combination of Southern rock riffs and blasting grindcore.

In 1998, Blood Duster again toured Australia with Brutal Truth, and recorded shows for a planned double live album. The next album, controversially entitled Cunt, was released worldwide in 2001 and saw Blood Duster returning to a more percussive-driven grind style. It was also around this time that the band appeared in the music video for the song "Thunderbirds Are Coming Out" by fellow Australian band TISM.

=== 2001–present ===
After touring with The Dwarves in 2001, Blood Duster released the Drink, Fight, Fuck EP, which featured the track "66.6FMONYOURRADIODIAL", used in a television commercial for Reflex copying paper, along with three songs in the pre-gap.

The eponymous Blood Duster album was released in 2003 and featured special guests including original AC/DC singer Dave Evans, Jay Dunne from 28 Days, and all three members of Melbourne band The Spazzys. Two further singles were released from this album, "IWannaDoItWithADonna" in 2003 and "SixSixSixteen" in 2004.

Most of 2004 was spent touring Australia, first with the Big Day Out festival and then their own shows. Following tours with The Dwarves and Pungent Stench in early 2005, Blood Duster toured across Europe and Japan to promote the release of their first DVD, The Shape of Death to Come. In 2006, the band issued the live album Kill, Kill, Kill in a limited edition of 500 copies. The album was recorded in Sydney in 1996 during a tour with Brutal Truth.

In 2006, Blood Duster began pre-production for a proposed triple album consisting of a disc each of death metal, grind, and drone doom, with guest 1970s balladeer and actor Darryl Cotton. Lyden Nå (Norwegian for The Now Sound) was released in April 2007 as a double album, with the third disc available as additional downloadable content.

In October 2012, the group released KVLT, a vinyl album, which had been deliberately rendered unplayable; its producer Jason PC explained "It's kind of a statement piece ... We made the album, sat down and listened to it, thought: 'Yep, that's perfect, let's wreck it'." The masters for the record had had the letters KVLT and a pentagram scratched into it prior to pressing. The process was documented on the band's YouTube channel. Five tracks from the album, however, were simultaneously released on digital service providers under the title Svck, and a cover of The Angels's "Am I Ever Gonna See Your Face Again?", recorded during the sessions, would later be released as a non-album single.

Blood Duster played their final show on 9 December 2017 at the Corner Hotel, Richmond.

On 4 December 2024, the band were announced as reforming to play the Blacken Open Air festival in Alice Springs between 19 and 22 September 2025. On the 23rd, they also announced an appearance at the Obscene Extreme festival in Czechia between 9 and 13 July.

The band's former drummer Shane Rout died on 8 March 2026, at the age of 53.

== Members ==
=== Current lineup ===
- Jason Fuller - bass, vocals (1991–2017, 2024–present)
- Tony Forde - vocals (1993–2017, 2024–present)
- Matt Rizzo - drums (1994–1995, 1999–2007, 2014–2017, 2024–present)
- Scott Pritchard - guitar, vocals (2002–2015, 2024–present)
- Matt Collins - guitar (2000–2017, 2024–present)

=== Former members ===
- Brick - drums (1991)
- Callum Wilson - vocals (1992)
- Troy Darlington - guitar (1992)
- Shane Rout - drums (1993–1994, 1999; died 2026)
- Brad Johnson - guitar (1994)
- Euan Heriot - drums (1995–1999)
- Fin Allman - guitar (1995–2000)
- Josh Nixon - guitar (2000–2003)
- David Haley - drums (2007–2014)

Timeline

== Discography ==
=== Albums ===
Yeest

- Released: 1995
- Format: CD
- Label: Relapse Records, Dr Jim's Records/Shock Records

Str8 Outta Northcote

- Released: 1998
- Format: CD
- Label: Dr Jims (Australia), Relapse (world)

Cunt

- Released: 2001
- Format: CD, LP
- Label: Dr Jims (Australia), Relapse (world)

Blood Duster

- Released: 6 October 2003
- Format: CD
- Label: Shock Records (Australia), Season of Mist (world)
- Singles: "I Wanna Do It With a Donna", "Six Six Sixteen"

Fisting the Dead... Again

- Released: 2005
- Format: CD
- Label: Relapse

Kill Kill Kill

- Released: 2006
- Format: CD
- Label: Straight Up

Lyden Nå

- Released: 2007
- Format: CD
- Label: Shock, Season of Mist
- Producer: Jason PC
- Singles: "PissStomper"

Kvlt (Limited to 66 copies. Master was deliberately destroyed prior to pressing, rendering the album unplayable. "Am I Ever Gonna See Your Face Again" is a cover of The Angels's song.)

- Released: October 2012
- Format: LP
- Label: Blood Duster
- Producer: Jason PC
- Singles: Svck EP, "Am I Ever Gonna See Your Face Again"

=== EPs and singles ===
Fisting the Dead

- Released: 1993
- Format: CD
- Label: Dr Jims (DR JIM 8)

Yeest

- Released: 1995
- Format: CD
- Label: Dr Jims
- Tracks: "Albert", "Northcote", "Motherfuckin'", "Chuck", "Showered With Affection Pt 2", "Strop", "Nasty Chicks (With Big Ol' Tits)"

D.F.F.

- Released: 18 November 2002
- Format: CD
- Label: High Voltage, Shock
- Tracks: "The Spirit of Sore Throat Has Long Since Died", "Ornery Hornery", "D.F.F.", "66.6fm On Your Radio Dial", "Ticket to Ride", "Let's Fuck".

"IWannaDoItWithADonna" from the album Blood Duster

- Released: 2003
- Format: 7"
- Tracks: "I Wanna Do It With a Donna", "Midnight NAMBLA"

"SixSixSixteen" from the album Blood Duster

- Released: 3 May 2004
- Format: 7"
- Label: High Voltage
- Chart position: ARIA Hitseekers Singles: 17
- Tracks: "SixSixSixteen", "LovePISS", "It's a Man's World", "I Wanna Be Your Pimp".
