= List of number-one urban singles of 2003 (Australia) =

ARIA Charts number-one urban singles of 2003 2004 >

Other Australian number-one charts of 2003
- albums
- singles
- dance singles

Top Australian singles and albums of 2003
- Triple J Hottest 100
- top 25 singles
- top 25 albums

The ARIA Urban Chart is a chart that ranks the best-performing Urban tracks singles of Australia. It is published by Australian Recording Industry Association (ARIA), an organisation who collect music data for the weekly ARIA Charts. To be eligible to appear on the chart, the recording must be a single, and be "predominantly of a Urban nature".

== Chart history ==
Issue date	Song	Artist(s)	Reference
6 January	"Lose Yourself"	Eminem	
13 January	"Lose Yourself"	Eminem	
20 January	"Lose Yourself"	Eminem	
27 January	"Lose Yourself"	Eminem	
3 February	"Lose Yourself"	Eminem	
10 February	"Lose Yourself"	Eminem	
17 February	"Lose Yourself"	Eminem	
24 February	"Lose Yourself"	Eminem	
3 March	"Lose Yourself"	Eminem	
10 March	"Nu Flow"	Big Brovaz	
17 March	"All I Have"	Jennifer Lopez featuring LL Cool J	
24 March	"Nu Flow"	Big Brovaz	
31 March	"Nu Flow"	Big Brovaz	
7 April	"In da club"	50 Cent	
14 April	"In da club"	50 Cent	
21 April	"In da club"	50 Cent	
28 April	"In da club"	50 Cent	
5 May	"In da club"	50 Cent	
12 May	"In da club"	50 Cent	
19 May	"In da club"	50 Cent	
26 May	"In da club"	50 Cent	
2 June	"In da club"	50 Cent	
9 June	"In da club"	50 Cent	
16 June	"I Know What You Want"	Busta Rhymes featuring Mariah Carey	
23 June	"I Know What You Want"	Busta Rhymes featuring Mariah Carey	
30 June	"I Know What You Want"	Busta Rhymes featuring Mariah Carey	
7 July	"I Know What You Want"	Busta Rhymes featuring Mariah Carey	
14 July	"Ignition (Remix)"	R. Kelly	
21 July	"Ignition (Remix)"	R. Kelly	
28 July	"Ignition (Remix)"	R. Kelly	
4 August	"Ignition (Remix)"	R. Kelly	
11 August	"Ignition (Remix)"	R. Kelly	
18 August	"Ignition (Remix)"	R. Kelly	
25 August	"Angel"	Amanda Perez	
1 September	"Angel"	Amanda Perez	
8 September	"Angel"	Amanda Perez	
15 September	"Angel"	Amanda Perez	
22 September	"Angel"	Amanda Perez	
29 September	"Angel"	Amanda Perez	
6 October	"Senorita"	Justin Timberlake	
13 October	"Baby Boy"	Beyoncé featuring Sean Paul	
20 October	"Baby Boy"	Beyoncé featuring Sean Paul	
27 October	"P.I.M.P."	50 Cent	
3 November	"P.I.M.P."	50 Cent	
10 November	"P.I.M.P."	50 Cent	
17 November	"Baby Boy"	Beyoncé featuring Sean Paul	
24 November	"Baby Boy"	Beyoncé featuring Sean Paul	
1 December	"Angels Brought Me Here"	Guy Sebastian	
8 December	"Angels Brought Me Here"	Guy Sebastian	
15 December	"Angels Brought Me Here"	Guy Sebastian	
22 December	"Shut Up"	The Black Eyed Peas	
29 December	"Shut Up"	The Black Eyed Peas	

== Number-one artists ==
Position	Artist	Weeks at No. 1
1	50 Cent	10
2	Eminem	9
3	Amanda Perez	6
3	R. Kelly	6
4	Beyoncé	4
4	Sean Paul	4
4	Busta Rhymes	4
4	Mariah Carey	4
5	Big Brovaz	3
5	Guy Sebastian	3
6	The Black Eyed Peas	2
7	Jennifer Lopez	1
7	Justin Timberlake	1
7	LL Cool J	1

== See also ==
- 2003 in music
- List of number-one singles of 2003 (Australia)
