= List of number-one club tracks of 2003 (Australia) =

ARIA Charts number-one club tracks of 2003 2004 >

Other Australian number-one charts of 2003
- albums
- singles
- dance singles

Top Australian singles and albums of 2003
- Triple J Hottest 100
- top 25 singles
- top 25 albums

This is a list of ARIA club chart number-one hits from 2003, which is collected from Australian Recording Industry Association (ARIA) from weekly DJ reports.

== Chart ==
Date		Song	Artist(s)	Reference
January	6	"So Much Love to Give"	Together	
January	13	"So Much Love to Give"	Together	
January	20	"So Much Love to Give"	Together	
January	27	"So Much Love to Give"	Together	
February	3	"Corcovado"	Everything but the Girl	
February	10	"One of my Kind"	Rogue Traders vs. Inxs	
February	17	"Come on Over"	John Silver	
February	24	"Feelin' Love"	Soulsearcher	
March	3	"In da Club"	50 Cent	
March	10	"In da Club"	50 Cent	
March	17	"In da Club"	50 Cent	
March	24	"Fix My Sink"	DJ Sneak featuring Bear Who?	
March	31	"Beautiful"(PETER RAUHOFER MIX)	Christina Aguilera	
April	7	"Gossip Folks"(FATBOY SLIM/NEW CENTURION MIX)	Missy Elliott	
April	14	"My Love Is Always"	Saffron Hill featuring Ben Onono	
April	21	"My Love Is Always"	Saffron Hill featuring Ben Onono	
April	28	"My Love Is Always"	Saffron Hill featuring Ben Onono	
May	5	"My Love Is Always"	Saffron Hill featuring Ben Onono	
May	12	"My Love Is Always"	Saffron Hill featuring Ben Onono	
May	19	"My Love Is Always"	Saffron Hill featuring Ben Onono	
May	26	"Who said (Stuck in the UK)"	Planet Funk	
June	2	"Stay?"	Rogue Traders	
June	9	"How Did You Know?"	Kurtis Mantronik presents the Chamonix	
June	16	"Satisfaction"	Benny Benassi presents the biz	
June	23	"Satisfaction"	Benny Benassi presents the biz	
June	30	"Satisfaction"	Benny Benassi presents the biz	
July	7	"Feel Alive"	Pure Orange	
July	14	"Feel Alive"	Pure Orange	
July	21	"All In My Head"	Kosheen	
July	28	"Wasted"	Cam Farrar	
August	4	"Wasted"	Cam Farrar	
August	11	"Wasted"	Cam Farrar	
August	18	"Wasted"	Cam Farrar	
August	25	"Wasted"	Cam Farrar	
September	1	"Wasted"	Cam Farrar	
September	8	"Less Talk More Action"	Tim Deluxe	
September	15	"Less Talk More Action"	Tim Deluxe	
September	22	"Less Talk More Action"	Tim Deluxe	
September	29	"Less Talk More Action"	Tim Deluxe	
October	6	"Less Talk More Action"	Tim Deluxe	
October	13	"Less Talk More Action"	Tim Deluxe	
October	20	"Less Talk More Action"	Tim Deluxe	
October	27	"Lucky Star"	Basement Jaxx	
November	3	"Lucky Star"	Basement Jaxx	
November	10	"Lucky Star"	Basement Jaxx	
November	17	"Lucky Star"	Basement Jaxx	
November	24	"Lucky Star"	Basement Jaxx	
December	1	"Born Slippy .NUXX"	Underworld	
December	8	"Born Slippy .NUXX"	Underworld	
December	15	"Born Slippy .NUXX"	Underworld	
December	22	"Milkshake"	Kelis	
December	29	"Milkshake"	Kelis	

== Number-one artists ==
Position	Artist	Weeks at No. 1
1	Tim Deluxe	7
2	Cam Farrar	6
2	Saffron Hill	6
2	Ben Onono	6
3	Basement Jaxx	5
4	Together	4
5	50 Cent	3
5	Benny Benassi	3
5	Underworld	3
6	Kelis	2
6	Pure Orange	2
6	Rogue Traders	2
7	Everything but the Girl	1
7	DJ Sneak	1
7	Bear Who?	1
7	Christina Aguilera	1
7	John Silver	1
7	Kosheen	1
7	Kurtis Mantronik	1
7	Planet Funk	1
7	Inxs	1
7	Missy Elliott	1
7	Soulsearcher	1

== See also ==
- ARIA Charts
- List of number-one singles of 2003 (Australia)
- List of number-one albums of 2003 (Australia)
- 2003 in music
