= List of number-one urban albums of 2004 (Australia) =

Number one urban albums in Australia as compiled by ARIA in 2004

ARIA Charts number-one urban albums of 2004 < 2003 2005 >

Other Australian number-one charts of 2004
- albums
- singles
- dance singles

Top Australian singles and albums of 2004
- Triple J Hottest 100
- top 25 singles
- top 25 albums

This is a list of albums that reached number-one on the ARIA Urban Albums Chart in 2004. The ARIA Urban Albums Chart is a weekly chart that ranks the best-performing urban albums in Australia. It is published by the Australian Recording Industry Association (ARIA), an organisation that collects music data for the weekly ARIA Charts. To be eligible to appear on the chart, the recording must be an album of a predominantly urban nature.

== Chart history ==
Issue date	Album	Artist(s)	Reference
5 January	Elephunk	Black Eyed Peas	
12 January	Number Ones	Michael Jackson	
19 January	Elephunk	Black Eyed Peas	
26 January	Elephunk	Black Eyed Peas	
2 February	Elephunk	Black Eyed Peas	
9 February	Elephunk	Black Eyed Peas	
16 February	Elephunk	Black Eyed Peas	
23 February	Elephunk	Black Eyed Peas	
1 March	Elephunk	Black Eyed Peas	
8 March	Elephunk	Black Eyed Peas	
15 March	Elephunk	Black Eyed Peas	
22 March	Elephunk	Black Eyed Peas	
29 March	Fly or Die	N.E.R.D	
5 April	Elephunk	Black Eyed Peas	
12 April	Confessions	Usher	
19 April	Confessions	Usher	
26 April	Confessions	Usher	
3 May	D12 World	D12	
10 May	D12 World	D12	
17 May	D12 World	D12	
24 May	Confessions	Usher	
31 May	Confessions	Usher	
7 June	Confessions	Usher	
14 June	Confessions	Usher	
21 June	To the 5 Boroughs	Beastie Boys	
28 June	To the 5 Boroughs	Beastie Boys	
5 July	Confessions	Usher	
12 July	Confessions	Usher	
19 July	Elephunk	Black Eyed Peas	
26 July	Elephunk	Black Eyed Peas	
2 August	One Determined Heart	Paulini	
9 August	One Determined Heart	Paulini	
16 August	Elephunk	Black Eyed Peas	
23 August	Elephunk	Black Eyed Peas	
30 August	Elephunk	Black Eyed Peas	
6 September	Elephunk	Black Eyed Peas	
13 September	Elephunk	Black Eyed Peas	
20 September	Urban Hymns 7	Various Artists	
27 September	Urban Hymns 7	Various Artists	
4 October	Urban Hymns 7	Various Artists	
11 October	Urban Hymns 7	Various Artists	
18 October	Urban Hymns 7	Various Artists	
25 October	Confessions	Usher	
1 November	Confessions	Usher	
8 November	Confessions	Usher	
15 November	Confessions	Usher	
22 November	Encore	Eminem	
29 November	Encore	Eminem	
6 December	Encore	Eminem	
13 December	Encore	Eminem	
20 December	Encore	Eminem	
27 December	Encore	Eminem	

== See also ==
- 2004 in music
- List of number-one albums of 2004 (Australia)
