= List of number-one urban singles of 2004 (Australia) =

ARIA Charts number-one urban singles of 2004 2005 >

Other Australian number-one charts of 2004
- albums
- singles
- dance singles

Top Australian singles and albums of 2004
- Triple J Hottest 100
- top 25 singles
- top 25 albums

The ARIA Urban Chart is a chart that ranks the best-performing Urban tracks singles of Australia. It is published by Australian Recording Industry Association (ARIA), an organisation who collect music data for the weekly ARIA Charts. To be eligible to appear on the chart, the recording must be a single, and be "predominantly of a Urban nature".

== Chart history ==
Issue date	Song	Artist(s)	Reference
5 January	"Shut Up"	The Black Eyed Peas	
12 January	"Shut Up"	The Black Eyed Peas	
19 January	"Hey Ya!"	Outkast	
26 January	"Hey Ya!"	Outkast	
2 February	"Milkshake"	Kelis	
9 February	"Milkshake"	Kelis	
16 February	"Milkshake"	Kelis	
23 February	"Milkshake"	Kelis	
1 March	"Milkshake"	Kelis	
8 March	"Superstar"	Jamelia	
15 March	"Superstar"	Jamelia	
22 March	"Superstar"	Jamelia	
29 March	"Yeah!"	Usher featuring Ludacris & Lil Jon	
5 April	"Yeah!"	Usher featuring Ludacris & Lil Jon	
12 April	"Yeah!"	Usher featuring Ludacris & Lil Jon	
19 April	"Yeah!"	Usher featuring Ludacris & Lil Jon	
26 April	"My Band"	D12	
3 May	"My Band"	D12	
10 May	"My Band"	D12	
17 May	"My Band"	D12	
24 May	"My Band"	D12	
31 May	"I Don't Wanna Know"	Mario Winans featuring Enya and P.Diddy	
7 June	"Roses"	Outkast	
14 June	"I Don't Wanna Know"	Mario Winans featuring Enya and P.Diddy	
21 June	"F.U.R.B. (Fuck You Right Back)"	Frankee	
28 June	"F.U.R.B. (Fuck You Right Back)"	Frankee	
5 July	"F.U.R.B. (Fuck You Right Back)"	Frankee	
12 July	"Burn"	Usher	
19 July	"Burn"	Usher	
26 July	"Let's Get It Started"	The Black Eyed Peas	
2 August	"Burn"	Usher	
9 August	"How Come"	D12	
16 August	"How Come"	D12	
23 August	"How Come"	D12	
30 August	"My Place"	Nelly	
6 September	"Leave (Get Out)"	JoJo	
13 September	"Leave (Get Out)"	JoJo	
20 September	"Leave (Get Out)"	JoJo	
27 September	"Leave (Get Out)"	JoJo	
4 October	"Out With My Baby"	Guy Sebastian	
11 October	"Leave (Get Out)"	JoJo	
18 October	"Leave (Get Out)"	JoJo	
25 October	"Leave (Get Out)"	JoJo	
1 November	"Leave (Get Out)"	JoJo	
8 November	"Just Lose It"	Eminem	
15 November	"Just Lose It"	Eminem	
22 November	"Just Lose It"	Eminem	
29 November	"Lose My Breath"	Destiny's Child	
6 December	"Lose My Breath"	Destiny's Child	
13 December	"Lose My Breath"	Destiny's Child	
20 December	"Lose My Breath"	Destiny's Child	
27 December	"Lose My Breath"	Destiny's Child	

== Number-one artists ==
Position	Artist	Weeks at No. 1
1	D12	8
1	JoJo	8
2	Usher	7
3	Destiny's Child	5
3	Kelis	5
4	Ludacris (as featuring)	4
4	Lil Jon (as featuring)	4
5	The Black Eyed Peas	3
5	Eminem	3
5	Frankee	3
5	Jamelia	3
5	Outkast	3
6	Mario Winans	2
6	P.Diddy (as featuring)	2
6	Enya (as featuring)	2
7	Guy Sebastian	1
7	Nelly	1

== See also ==
- 2004 in music
- List of number-one singles of 2004 (Australia)
