= List of number-one country albums of 2004 (Australia) =

ARIA Charts number-one country albums of 2004 < 2003 2005 >

Other Australian number-one charts of 2004
- albums
- singles
- dance singles

Top Australian singles and albums of 2004
- Triple J Hottest 100
- top 25 singles
- top 25 albums

These are the Australian Country number-one albums of 2004, per the ARIA Charts.

Issue date	Album	Artist
5 January	Home	Dixie Chicks
12 January	Top of the World Tour: Live	Dixie Chicks
19 January	Up!	Shania Twain
26 January	Up!	Shania Twain
2 February	The Winners 2004	Various Artists
9 February	The Winners 2004	Various Artists
16 February	The Winners 2004	Various Artists
23 February	The Winners 2004	Various Artists
1 March	The Winners 2004	Various Artists
8 March	Columbia Lane - The Last Sessions	Slim Dusty
15 March	Columbia Lane - The Last Sessions	Slim Dusty
22 March	Columbia Lane - The Last Sessions	Slim Dusty
29 March	Columbia Lane - The Last Sessions	Slim Dusty
5 April	Columbia Lane - The Last Sessions	Slim Dusty
12 April	Columbia Lane - The Last Sessions	Slim Dusty
19 April	Columbia Lane - The Last Sessions	Slim Dusty
26 April	Columbia Lane - The Last Sessions	Slim Dusty
3 May	Columbia Lane - The Last Sessions	Slim Dusty
10 May	Columbia Lane - The Last Sessions	Slim Dusty
17 May	Columbia Lane - The Last Sessions	Slim Dusty
24 May	Columbia Lane - The Last Sessions	Slim Dusty
31 May	Family Tree	Melinda Schneider
7 June	Wayward Angel	Kasey Chambers
14 June	Wayward Angel	Kasey Chambers
21 June	Wayward Angel	Kasey Chambers
28 June	Wayward Angel	Kasey Chambers
5 July	Wayward Angel	Kasey Chambers
12 July	Wayward Angel	Kasey Chambers
19 July	Wayward Angel	Kasey Chambers
26 July	Wayward Angel	Kasey Chambers
2 August	Wayward Angel	Kasey Chambers
9 August	Wayward Angel	Kasey Chambers
16 August	Wayward Angel	Kasey Chambers
23 August	Wayward Angel	Kasey Chambers
30 August	Wayward Angel	Kasey Chambers
6 September	Wayward Angel	Kasey Chambers
13 September	Wayward Angel	Kasey Chambers
20 September	Wayward Angel	Kasey Chambers
27 September	Be Here	Keith Urban
4 October	Be Here	Keith Urban
11 October	Be Here	Keith Urban
18 October	Be Here	Keith Urban
25 October	The Big Ones: Greatest Hits Vol. 1	Lee Kernaghan
1 November	The Big Ones: Greatest Hits Vol. 1	Lee Kernaghan
8 November	The Big Ones: Greatest Hits Vol. 1	Lee Kernaghan
15 November	Greatest Hits	Shania Twain
22 November	Greatest Hits	Shania Twain
29 November	Greatest Hits	Shania Twain
6 December	Greatest Hits	Shania Twain
13 December	Greatest Hits	Shania Twain
20 December	Greatest Hits	Shania Twain
27 December	Greatest Hits	Shania Twain

== See also ==
- 2004 in music
- List of number-one albums of 2004 (Australia)
