= List of number-one urban albums of 2003 (Australia) =

ARIA Charts number-one urban albums of 2003 < 2002 2004 >

Other Australian number-one charts of 2003
- albums
- singles
- dance singles

Top Australian singles and albums of 2003
- Triple J Hottest 100
- top 25 singles
- top 25 albums

This is a list of albums that reached number-one on the ARIA Urban Albums Chart in 2003. The ARIA Urban Albums Chart is a weekly chart that ranks the best-performing urban albums in Australia. It is published by the Australian Recording Industry Association (ARIA), an organisation that collects music data for the weekly ARIA Charts. To be eligible to appear on the chart, the recording must be an album of a predominantly urban nature.

== Chart history ==
Issue date	Album	Artist(s)	Reference
6 January	8 Mile	Various Artists	
13 January	8 Mile	Various Artists	
20 January	8 Mile	Various Artists	
27 January	8 Mile	Various Artists	
3 February	8 Mile	Various Artists	
10 February	8 Mile	Various Artists	
17 February	8 Mile	Various Artists	
24 February	8 Mile	Various Artists	
3 March	The Eminem Show	Eminem	
10 March	The Eminem Show	Eminem	
17 March	Get Rich or Die Tryin'	50 Cent	
24 March	Get Rich or Die Tryin'	50 Cent	
31 March	Get Rich or Die Tryin'	50 Cent	
7 April	Get Rich or Die Tryin'	50 Cent	
14 April	Get Rich or Die Tryin'	50 Cent	
21 April	Get Rich or Die Tryin'	50 Cent	
28 April	Get Rich or Die Tryin'	50 Cent	
5 May	Justified	Justin Timberlake	
12 May	Justified	Justin Timberlake	
19 May	Justified	Justin Timberlake	
26 May	Justified	Justin Timberlake	
2 June	Everyone Deserves Music	Michael Franti & Spearhead	
9 June	Get Rich or Die Tryin'	50 Cent	
16 June	Eminem Show	Eminem	
23 June	Eminem Show	Eminem	
30 June	Dangerously in Love	Beyoncé	
7 July	Dangerously in Love	Beyoncé	
14 July	Dangerously in Love	Beyoncé	
21 July	Dangerously in Love	Beyoncé	
28 July	Dangerously in Love	Beyoncé	
4 August	Dangerously in Love	Beyoncé	
11 August	Dangerously in Love	Beyoncé	
18 August	Stripped	Christina Aguilera	
25 August	Stripped	Christina Aguilera	
1 September	Stripped	Christina Aguilera	
8 September	Stripped	Christina Aguilera	
15 September	Stripped	Christina Aguilera	
22 September	Stripped	Christina Aguilera	
29 September	Stripped	Christina Aguilera	
6 October	Stripped	Christina Aguilera	
13 October	Stripped	Christina Aguilera	
20 October	Stripped	Christina Aguilera	
27 October	Stripped	Christina Aguilera	
3 November	Stripped	Christina Aguilera	
10 November	Stripped	Christina Aguilera	
17 November	Stripped	Christina Aguilera	
24 November	Number Ones	Michael Jackson	
1 December	Number Ones	Michael Jackson	
8 December	Number Ones	Michael Jackson	
15 December	Number Ones	Michael Jackson	
22 December	Number Ones	Michael Jackson	
29 December	Number Ones	Michael Jackson	

== See also ==
- 2003 in music
- List of number-one albums of 2003 (Australia)
