= List of number-one urban albums of 2005 (Australia) =

ARIA Charts number-one urban albums of 2005 < 2004 2006 >

Other Australian number-one charts of 2005
- albums
- singles
- dance singles

Top Australian singles and albums of 2005
- Triple J Hottest 100
- top 25 singles
- top 25 albums

This is a list of albums that reached number-one on the ARIA Urban Albums Chart in 2005. The ARIA Urban Albums Chart is a weekly chart that ranks the best-performing urban albums in Australia. It is published by the Australian Recording Industry Association (ARIA), an organisation that collects music data for the weekly ARIA Charts. To be eligible to appear on the chart, the recording must be an album of a predominantly urban nature.

== Chart history ==
Issue date	Album	Artist(s)	Reference
3 January	Encore	Eminem	
10 January	Encore	Eminem	
17 January	Encore	Eminem	
24 January	Encore	Eminem	
31 January	Encore	Eminem	
7 February	Blazin' 4: The Mixtape	Various Artists	
14 February	Encore	Eminem	
21 February	Encore	Eminem	
28 February	R&B: The Collection	Various Artists	
7 March	R&B: The Collection	Various Artists	
14 March	The Massacre	50 Cent	
21 March	The Massacre	50 Cent	
28 March	The Massacre	50 Cent	
4 April	The Massacre	50 Cent	
11 April	R'N'B Superclub CD - Vol.4	Various Artists	
18 April	R'N'B Superclub CD - Vol.4	Various Artists	
25 April	Destiny Fulfilled	Destiny's Child	
2 May	Destiny Fulfilled	Destiny's Child	
9 May	Destiny Fulfilled	Destiny's Child	
16 May	Destiny Fulfilled	Destiny's Child	
23 May	Destiny Fulfilled	Destiny's Child	
30 May	Demon Days	Gorillaz	
6 June	Monkey Business	Black Eyed Peas	
13 June	Monkey Business	Black Eyed Peas	
20 June	Monkey Business	Black Eyed Peas	
27 June	Monkey Business	Black Eyed Peas	
4 July	Monkey Business	Black Eyed Peas	
11 July	Monkey Business	Black Eyed Peas	
18 July	The Emancipation of Mimi	Mariah Carey	
25 July	Monkey Business	Black Eyed Peas	
1 August	Monkey Business	Black Eyed Peas	
8 August	Monkey Business	Black Eyed Peas	
15 August	Monkey Business	Black Eyed Peas	
22 August	Monkey Business	Black Eyed Peas	
29 August	Monkey Business	Black Eyed Peas	
5 September	Monkey Business	Black Eyed Peas	
12 September	Monkey Business	Black Eyed Peas	
19 September	Monkey Business	Black Eyed Peas	
26 September	Monkey Business	Black Eyed Peas	
3 October	Monkey Business	Black Eyed Peas	
10 October	Monkey Business	Black Eyed Peas	
17 October	Monkey Business	Black Eyed Peas	
24 October	Monkey Business	Black Eyed Peas	
31 October	Monkey Business	Black Eyed Peas	
7 November	#1's	Destiny's Child	
14 November	Monkey Business	Black Eyed Peas	
21 November	Monkey Business	Black Eyed Peas	
28 November	Monkey Business	Black Eyed Peas	
5 December	Monkey Business	Black Eyed Peas	
12 December	Curtain Call: The Hits	Eminem	
19 December	Curtain Call: The Hits	Eminem	
26 December	Curtain Call: The Hits	Eminem	

== See also ==
- 2005 in music
- List of number-one albums of 2005 (Australia)
