= List of number-one country albums of 2003 (Australia) =

ARIA Charts number-one country albums of 2003 < 2002 2004 >

Other Australian number-one charts of 2003
- albums
- singles
- dance singles

Top Australian singles and albums of 2003
- Triple J Hottest 100
- top 25 singles
- top 25 albums

These are the Australian Country number-one albums of 2003, per the ARIA Charts.

Issue date	Album	Artist
6 January	Up!	Shania Twain
13 January	Up!	Shania Twain
20 January	Up!	Shania Twain
27 January	Barricades & Brickwalls	Kasey Chambers
3 February	The Winners 2003	Various Artists
10 February	The Winners 2003	Various Artists
17 February	Barricades & Brickwalls	Kasey Chambers
24 February	Barricades & Brickwalls	Kasey Chambers
3 March	Barricades & Brickwalls	Kasey Chambers
10 March	Barricades & Brickwalls	Kasey Chambers
17 March	Up!	Shania Twain
24 March	Up!	Shania Twain
31 March	Home	Dixie Chicks
7 April	Home	Dixie Chicks
14 April	Home	Dixie Chicks
21 April	Home	Dixie Chicks
28 April	Home	Dixie Chicks
5 May	Home	Dixie Chicks
12 May	Home	Dixie Chicks
19 May	Home	Dixie Chicks
26 May	Home	Dixie Chicks
2 June	Home	Dixie Chicks
9 June	Home	Dixie Chicks
16 June	Home	Dixie Chicks
23 June	Home	Dixie Chicks
30 June	Home	Dixie Chicks
7 July	Home	Dixie Chicks
14 July	Home	Dixie Chicks
21 July	Home	Dixie Chicks
28 July	Home	Dixie Chicks
4 August	Home	Dixie Chicks
11 August	Home	Dixie Chicks
18 August	Home	Dixie Chicks
25 August	Home	Dixie Chicks
1 September	True Blue Two	John Williamson
8 September	True Blue Two	John Williamson
15 September	Home	Dixie Chicks
22 September	Home	Dixie Chicks
29 September	The Very Best of Slim Dusty	Slim Dusty
6 October	Home	Dixie Chicks
13 October	Home	Dixie Chicks
20 October	Home	Dixie Chicks
27 October	Home	Dixie Chicks
3 November	Home	Dixie Chicks
10 November	The Very Best of Slim Dusty	Slim Dusty
17 November	The Very Best of Slim Dusty	Slim Dusty
24 November	Greatest Hits	LeAnn Rimes
1 December	Greatest Hits	LeAnn Rimes
8 December	Top of the World Tour: Live	Dixie Chicks
15 December	Top of the World Tour: Live	Dixie Chicks
22 December	Top of the World Tour: Live	Dixie Chicks
29 December	Top of the World Tour: Live	Dixie Chicks

== See also ==
- 2003 in music
- List of number-one albums of 2003 (Australia)
