= List of number-one country albums of 2005 (Australia) =

ARIA Charts number-one country albums of 2005 < 2004 2006 >

Other Australian number-one charts of 2005
- albums
- singles
- dance singles

Top Australian singles and albums of 2005
- Triple J Hottest 100
- top 25 singles
- top 25 albums

These are the Australian Country number-one albums of 2005, per the ARIA Charts.

Issue date	Album	Artist
3 January	Greatest Hits	Shania Twain
10 January	Greatest Hits	Shania Twain
17 January	Greatest Hits	Shania Twain
24 January	The Winners 2005	Various Artists
31 January	The Winners 2005	Various Artists
7 February	Wayward Angel	Kasey Chambers
14 February	Wayward Angel	Kasey Chambers
21 February	Wayward Angel	Kasey Chambers
28 February	Wayward Angel	Kasey Chambers
7 March	Wayward Angel	Kasey Chambers
14 March	Wayward Angel	Kasey Chambers
21 March	Wayward Angel	Kasey Chambers
28 March	Wayward Angel	Kasey Chambers
4 April	Wayward Angel	Kasey Chambers
11 April	Wayward Angel	Kasey Chambers
18 April	Wayward Angel	Kasey Chambers
25 April	Wayward Angel	Kasey Chambers
2 May	Wayward Angel	Kasey Chambers
9 May	Be Here	Keith Urban
16 May	Cold Roses	Ryan Adams
23 May	Be Here	Keith Urban
30 May	Be Here	Keith Urban
6 June	Foggy Highway	Paul Kelly & The Stormwater Boys
13 June	Foggy Highway	Paul Kelly & The Stormwater Boys
20 June	Foggy Highway	Paul Kelly & The Stormwater Boys
27 June	Foggy Highway	Paul Kelly & The Stormwater Boys
4 July	Foggy Highway	Paul Kelly & The Stormwater Boys
11 July	Be Here	Keith Urban
18 July	Foggy Highway	Paul Kelly & The Storm water Boys
25 July	Firefly	Sara Storer
1 August	Firefly	Sara Storer
8 August	Firefly	Sara Storer
15 August	Chandelier Of Stars	John Williamson
22 August	Chandelier Of Stars	John Williamson
29 August	Chandelier Of Stars	John Williamson
5 September	Chandelier Of Stars	John Williamson
12 September	Chandelier Of Stars	John Williamson
19 September	Chandelier Of Stars	John Williamson
26 September	Chandelier Of Stars	John Williamson
3 October	Chandelier Of Stars	John Williamson
10 October	All Jacked Up	Gretchen Wilson
17 October	Brighter Day	Troy Cassar-Daley
24 October	Brighter Day	Troy Cassar-Daley
31 October	Be Here	Keith Urban
7 November	Be Here	Keith Urban
14 November	Chandelier Of Stars	John Williamson
21 November	Be Here	Keith Urban
28 November	Be Here	Keith Urban
5 December	Be Here	Keith Urban
12 December	Be Here	Keith Urban
19 December	Be Here	Keith Urban
26 December	Be Here	Keith Urban

== See also ==
- 2005 in music
- List of number-one albums of 2005 (Australia)
