= List of number-one urban singles of 2005 (Australia) =

ARIA Charts number-one urban singles of 2005 2006 >

Other Australian number-one charts of 2005
- albums
- singles
- dance singles

Top Australian singles and albums of 2005
- Triple J Hottest 100
- top 25 singles
- top 25 albums

The ARIA Urban Chart is a chart that ranks the best-performing Urban tracks singles of Australia. It is published by Australian Recording Industry Association (ARIA), an organisation who collect music data for the weekly ARIA Charts. To be eligible to appear on the chart, the recording must be a single, and be "predominantly of a Urban nature".

== Chart history ==
Issue date	Song	Artist(s)	Reference
3 January	"Lose My Breath"	Destiny's Child	
10 January	"Lose My Breath"	Destiny's Child	
17 January	"Wonderful"	Ja Rule featuring R. Kelly & Ashanti	
24 January	"Nasty Girl"	Nitty	
31 January	"Nasty Girl"	Nitty	
7 February	"Over and Over"	Nelly	
14 February	"Over and Over"	Nelly	
21 February	"Over and Over"	Nelly	
28 February	"Over and Over"	Nelly	
7 March	"Over and Over"	Nelly	
14 March	"Over and Over"	Nelly	
21 March	"Over and Over"	Nelly	
28 March	"Candy Shop"	50 Cent	
4 April	"Candy Shop"	50 Cent	
11 April	"1, 2 Step"	Ciara	
18 April	"1, 2 Step"	Ciara	
25 April	"Switch"	Will Smith	
1 May	"Signs"	Snoop Dogg featuring Justin Timberlake	
8 May	"Signs"	Snoop Dogg featuring Justin Timberlake	
15 May	"Switch"	Will Smith	
22 May	"Don't Phunk with My Heart"	The Black Eyed Peas	
29 May	"Don't Phunk with My Heart"	The Black Eyed Peas	
6 June	"Don't Phunk with My Heart"	The Black Eyed Peas	
13 June	"Don't Phunk with My Heart"	The Black Eyed Peas	
20 June	"Don't Phunk with My Heart"	The Black Eyed Peas	
27 June	"We Belong Together"	Mariah Carey	
4 July	"We Belong Together"	Mariah Carey	
11 July	"Lonely"	Akon	
18 July	"Lonely"	Akon	
25 July	"Lonely"	Akon	
1 August	"Lonely"	Akon	
8 August	"Lonely"	Akon	
15 August	"Lonely"	Akon	
22 August	"Ghetto Gospel"	2Pac	
29 August	"Don't Cha"	The Pussycat Dolls featuring Busta Rhymes	
5 September	"Don't Cha"	The Pussycat Dolls featuring Busta Rhymes	
12 September	"Don't Cha"	The Pussycat Dolls featuring Busta Rhymes	
19 September	"Don't Cha"	The Pussycat Dolls featuring Busta Rhymes	
26 September	"Don't Cha"	The Pussycat Dolls featuring Busta Rhymes	
3 October	"Don't Cha"	The Pussycat Dolls featuring Busta Rhymes	
10 October	"Don't Cha"	The Pussycat Dolls featuring Busta Rhymes	
17 October	"Don't Cha"	The Pussycat Dolls featuring Busta Rhymes	
24 October	"Gold Digger"	Kanye West featuring Jamie Foxx	
31 October	"Gold Digger"	Kanye West featuring Jamie Foxx	
7 November	"Gold Digger"	Kanye West featuring Jamie Foxx	
14 November	"Gold Digger"	Kanye West featuring Jamie Foxx	
21 November	"My Humps"	The Black Eyed Peas	
28 November	"My Humps"	The Black Eyed Peas	
5 December	"My Humps"	The Black Eyed Peas	
12 December	"My Humps"	The Black Eyed Peas	
19 December	"My Humps"	The Black Eyed Peas	
26 December	"My Humps"	The Black Eyed Peas	

== Number-one artists ==
Position	Artist	Weeks at No. 1
1	The Black Eyed Peas	11
2	The Pussycat Dolls	8
2	Busta Rhymes	8
3	Nelly	7
4	Akon	6
5	Kanye West	4
5	Jamie Foxx	4
6	50 Cent	2
6	Ciara	2
6	Destiny's Child	2
6	Nitty	2
6	Snoop Dogg	2
6	Justin Timberlake	2
6	Mariah Carey	2
6	Will Smith	2
7	Ja Rule	1
7	Ashanti	1
7	R. Kelly	1
7	2Pac	1

== See also ==
- 2005 in music
- List of number-one singles of 2005 (Australia)
