= List of number-one club tracks of 2004 (Australia) =

ARIA Charts number-one club tracks of 2004 2005 >

Other Australian number-one charts of 2004
- albums
- singles
- dance singles

Top Australian singles and albums of 2004
- Triple J Hottest 100
- top 25 singles
- top 25 albums

This is a list of ARIA club chart number-one hits from 2004, which is collected from Australian Recording Industry Association (ARIA) from weekly DJ reports.

== Chart ==
Date		Song	Artist(s)	Reference
January	12	"Manila"	Seelenluft featuring Michael Smith	
January	19	"Manila"	Seelenluft featuring Michael Smith	
January	26	"Good Luck"	Basement Jaxx	
February	2	"Good Luck"	Basement Jaxx	
February	9	"Good Luck"	Basement Jaxx	
February	16	"Good Luck"	Basement Jaxx	
February	23	"Good Luck"	Basement Jaxx	
March	1	"Good Luck"	Basement Jaxx	
March	8	"Breathe Don't Stop"	Mr.On vs. Jungle Brothers	
March	15	"Girls Can Be Cruel"	Infusion	
March	22	"Girls Can Be Cruel"	Infusion	
March	29	"Hear My Name"	Armand Van Helden	
April	5	"Hear My Name"	Armand Van Helden	
April	12	"Hear My Name"	Armand Van Helden	
April	19	"Hear My Name"	Armand Van Helden	
April	26	"Hear My Name"	Armand Van Helden	
May	3	"Hear My Name"	Armand Van Helden	
May	10	"Hear My Name"	Armand Van Helden	
May	17	"Hear My Name"	Armand Van Helden	
May	24	"I am Tha 1"	Mr Timothy	
May	31	"I am Tha 1"	Mr Timothy	
June	7	"I am Tha 1"	Mr Timothy	
June	14	"I am Tha 1"	Mr Timothy	
June	21	"Push Up"	The Freestylers	
June	28	"I am Tha 1"	Mr Timothy	
July	5	"Push Up"	The Freestylers	
July	12	"Push Up"	The Freestylers	
July	19	"Lola's Theme"	The Shapeshifters	
July	26	"Lola's Theme"	The Shapeshifters	
August	2	"Lola's Theme"	The Shapeshifters	
August	9	"Lola's Theme"	The Shapeshifters	
August	16	"Lola's Theme"	The Shapeshifters	
August	23	"Lola's Theme"	The Shapeshifters	
August	30	"My My My"	Armand Van Helden	
September	6	"My My My"	Armand Van Helden	
September	13	"My My My"	Armand Van Helden	
September	20	"My My My"	Armand Van Helden	
September	27	"My My My"	Armand Van Helden	
October	4	"My My My"	Armand Van Helden	
October	11	"My My My"	Armand Van Helden	
October	18	"Hip-Ma-Tize-Me"	Craig Obey & The Electric Force	
October	25	"Hip-Ma-Tize-Me"	Craig Obey & The Electric Force	
November	1	"Flashdance"	Deep Dish	
November	8	"Flashdance"	Deep Dish	
November	15	"Flashdance"	Deep Dish	
November	22	"Stand By Me"	Mr Timothy featuring Inaya Day	
November	29	"Stand By Me"	Mr Timothy featuring Inaya Day	
December	6	"Stand By Me"	Mr Timothy featuring Inaya Day	
December	13	"The Weekend"	Michael Gray	
December	20	"Nasty Girl"	Inaya Day	

== Number-one artists ==
Position	Artist	Weeks at No. 1
1	Armand Van Helden	15
2	Mr Timothy	8
3	Basement Jaxx	6
3	The Shapeshifters	6
4	Inaya Day	4
5	Deep Dish	3
5	The Freestylers	3
6	Infusion	2
6	Craig Obey & The Electric Force	2
6	Seelenluft	2
7	Mr.On	1
7	Jungle Brothers	1
7	Michael Gray	1

== See also ==
- ARIA Charts
- List of number-one singles of 2004 (Australia)
- List of number-one albums of 2004 (Australia)
- 2004 in music
