= List of number-one club tracks of 2005 (Australia) =

ARIA Charts number-one club tracks of 2005 2006 >

Other Australian number-one charts of 2005
- albums
- singles
- dance singles

Top Australian singles and albums of 2005
- Triple J Hottest 100
- top 25 singles
- top 25 albums

This is a list of ARIA club chart number-one hits from 2005, which is collected from Australian Recording Industry Association (ARIA) from weekly DJ reports.

== Chart ==
Date		Song	Artist(s)	Reference
January	17	"The Weekend"	Michael Gray	
January	24	"The Weekend"	Michael Gray	
January	31	"The Weekend"	Michael Gray	
February	7	"Right About Now"	Mousse T. featuring Emma Lanford	
February	14	"Right About Now"	Mousse T. featuring Emma Lanford	
February	21	"Right About Now"	Mousse T. featuring Emma Lanford	
February	28	"Right About Now"	Mousse T. featuring Emma Lanford	
March	7	"The Fruit"	Sander Kleinenberg	
March	14	"The Fruit"	Sander Kleinenberg	
March	21	"The Fruit"	Sander Kleinenberg	
March	28	"The Fruit"	Sander Kleinenberg	
April	4	"The Fruit"	Sander Kleinenberg	
April	11	"The Fruit"	Sander Kleinenberg	
April	18	"I Like the Way"	The Bodyrockers	
April	25	"I Like the Way"	The Bodyrockers	
May	2	"I Like the Way"	The Bodyrockers	
May	9	"I Like the Way"	The Bodyrockers	
May	16	"I Like the Way"	The Bodyrockers	
May	23	"I Like the Way"	The Bodyrockers	
May	30	"Your Body"	Tom Novy	
June	6	"Your Body"	Tom Novy	
June	13	"Your Body"	Tom Novy	
June	20	"Your Body"	Tom Novy	
June	27	"Say Hello"	Deep Dish	
July	4	"Say Hello"	Deep Dish	
July	11	"I Want You"	Paris Avenue	
July	18	"I Want You"	Paris Avenue	
July	25	"I Want You"	Paris Avenue	
August	1	"Something (To Make You Feel Alright)"	Silosonic	
August	8	"Something (To Make You Feel Alright)"	Silosonic	
August	15	"Something (To Make You Feel Alright)"	Silosonic	
August	22	"Something (To Make You Feel Alright)"	Silosonic	
August	29	"Something (To Make You Feel Alright)"	Silosonic	
September	5	"Something (To Make You Feel Alright)"	Silosonic	
September	12	"Something (To Make You Feel Alright)"	Silosonic	
September	19	"Let's Rock"	The Soulchip	
September	26	"Let's Rock"	The Soulchip	
October	3	"Let's Rock"	The Soulchip	
October	10	"Let's Rock"	The Soulchip	
October	17	"Let's Rock"	The Soulchip	
October	24	"Let's Rock"	The Soulchip	
October	31	"Let's Rock"	The Soulchip	
November	7	"No More Conversations"	Freeform Five	
November	14	"No More Conversations"	Freeform Five	
November	21	"No More Conversations"	Freeform Five	
November	28	"Flaunt It"	TV Rock	
December	5	"Flaunt It"	TV Rock	
December	12	"Flaunt It"	TV Rock	
December	19	"Flaunt It"	TV Rock	
December	26	"Never Say Never"	Vandalism	

== Number-one artists ==
Position	Artist	Weeks at No. 1
1	Silosonic	7
1	The Soulchip	7
2	The Bodyrockers	6
2	Sander Kleinenberg	6
3	Mousse T.	4
3	Emma Lanford	4
3	Tom Novy	4
3	TV Rock	4
4	Freeform Five	3
4	Michael Gray	3
4	Paris Avenue	3
5	Deep Dish	2
6	Vandalism	1

== See also ==
- ARIA Charts
- List of number-one singles of 2005 (Australia)
- List of number-one albums of 2005 (Australia)
- 2005 in music
