= Summerland (TV series) =

American drama television series

- Genre: Drama
- Created by: Stephen Tolkin; Lori Loughlin
- Starring: Lori Loughlin; Shawn Christian; Merrin Dungey; Ryan Kwanten; Jesse McCartney; Taylor Cole; Kay Panabaker; Nick Benson; Zac Efron
- Opening theme: "Beautiful Day" by Autograph
- Country of origin: United States
- Original language: English
- No. of seasons: 2
- No. of episodes: 26

Production
- Executive producers: Stephen Tolkin; Remi Aubuchon; Aaron Spelling; E. Duke Vincent
- Camera setup: Single-camera
- Running time: 42 minutes
- Production companies: Baby Owl Works Productions; The Lion and the Rose Productions; Spelling Television

Original release
- Network: The WB
- Release: June 1, 2004 – July 18, 2005

Summerland is an American drama television series created by Stephen Tolkin and Lori Loughlin. It is centered on a clothing designer in her 30s, Ava Gregory (Loughlin), raising her niece and nephews after their parents die in a tragic accident. They live with three of Ava's friends who also help raise the kids in the fictional city of Playa Linda, California.

Summerland premiered on June 1, 2004, on The WB. The series ran for a total of 26 episodes over two seasons. Its cancellation was announced on May 15, 2005, and the last episode aired on July 18, 2005. A soundtrack was released on March 19, 2005, and the show has been syndicated in many countries.

== Synopsis ==
=== Overview ===
The series follows Ava Gregory (Lori Loughlin), a fashion designer, and her housemates and niece and nephews as they learn to cope with a life-changing event and each other. After the death of their parents, Bradin (Jesse McCartney), Nikki (Kay Panabaker), and Derrick Westerly (Nick Benson) leave their home in Kansas to live with their Aunt Ava in Playa Linda, California. They live with three other house mates: Johnny Durant (Shawn Christian), Ava's ex-boyfriend; Susannah Rexford (Merrin Dungey), Ava's best friend and business partner; Jay Robertson (Ryan Kwanten), an Australian surfer who owns a local surf shop. The show follows the struggles that these friends and family face as they adapt to their new lives together. Jay has an on-again-off-again relationship with Erika Spalding (Taylor Cole), who becomes Bradin's surfing instructor. Cameron Bale (Zac Efron) is Nikki's boyfriend and classmate.

== Cast and characters ==
=== Main ===
Summerland initially featured a main cast of 8 characters. In the second season, after appearing as a recurring member in season 1, Zac Efron was added to the main cast, making it 9 main characters.

- Ava Gregory (Lori Loughlin) is a woman in her mid 30s who is raising her niece and nephews, Bradin, Nikki, and Derrick Westerly, after their parents' tragic deaths. She lives in a beach house with the children, her on again/off again boyfriend Johnny, her best friend Susannah, and another close friend, Jay. Ava has a very hectic life and also faces the stressful task of raising three children, who are all devastated at the loss of their parents and who deal with their loss in very different ways.
- Johnny Durant (Shawn Christian) is Ava's ex-boyfriend who still remains her roommate until Season 2. He gets along tremendously with the kids and opens up his own restaurant. Despite hiding it, he is desperately still in love with Ava.
- Susannah Rexford (Merrin Dungey) is Ava's best friend, business partner and roommate.
- Jay Robertson (Ryan Kwanten) is an Australian, who lives with Ava in Playa Linda and is the "big brother" to the children. He was dating Erika, despite his notorious behavior for being a playboy.
- Bradin Westerly (Jesse McCartney) is the oldest of the three children. He copes with the loss of his parents by drinking, getting involved in drugs and earns a reputation as a wild child. He is also an exceptional surfer and is offered a sponsorship by many major companies but his personal problems seem to get in the way on more than one occasion.
- Erika Spalding (Taylor Cole) is Jay's girlfriend. She helps coach Bradin with his surfing. She leaves to take care of her mother, but returns and begins dating Bradin.
- Nicole "Nikki" Westerly (Kay Panabaker) is an exceptionally bright child. She starts off trying to take over the "mother" role, but eventually settling in and making many friends including Cameron, who would later become her on/off boyfriend.
- Derrick Westerly (Nick Benson) is the youngest child. Despite being very close to his Aunt Ava, he can't quite get over the loss of his parents at such a young age.
- Cameron Bale (Zac Efron) is Nikki's best friend and on/off boyfriend. He lives with his troubled, divorced, alcoholic father (C. Thomas Howell). In season two, Efron became a part of the main cast after appearing as a recurring star in season one.

=== Recurring ===
- Sarah Borden (Sara Paxton) is a troubled teen with an addiction to pot, and problems with pathological lying. She becomes Bradin's girlfriend and pressures him into using drugs and having sex. Sarah's parents eventually send her to rehab.
- Mona (Carmen Electra) is Johnny's partner, who invests in a bar with him and eventually asks him to move in with her. However, in a tragic automobile accident Mona is killed leaving Johnny heartbroken. He changes the name of his bar to "Mona's Sandbar" in memory of Mona who transferred her share of the property to Johnny before she died.
- Callie (Danielle Savre) is a girl from the Midwest who becomes one of Bradin's girlfriends and helps him recover from his relationship with Sarah.
- Amber (Shelley Buckner) is Nikki's best friend, Carrie's ex-best friend, and Cameron's ex-girlfriend. Amber and Nikki didn't get along at first, but eventually they put their differences aside and become friends. Amber was once the most popular girl in school.
- Chris (Tyler Patrick Jones and Cole Petersen), is Derrick's best friend and often plays with Bradin, too.
- Simon O' Keefe (Jay Harrington) is Nikki's principal at Playa Linda Middle School. He and Ava go on their first date after meeting each other at Nikki's school and soon they fall deeply in love with each other. In the season 1 finale, Ava asks Simon to marry her, but in season 2 Simon calls off the wedding because he knows that Ava and Johnny still have deep feelings for each other.
- Carrie (Logan Browning) is Amber's ex-best friend. She is particularly mean to Nikki even after her and Amber become friends and often causes Nikki to be in embarrassing situations. Carrie is jealous of Nikki's friendship with Amber. She appears in Season 2 running for Class President against Cameron.

== Production ==
=== Music ===
Each episode of the show features a number of songs from various artists in addition to an original score. The music is usually used as a background element and is non-diegetic, although occasionally the music comes from a diegetic source. In the second-season episode "Where There's a Will, There's a Wave" Christy Carlson Romano stars as a fictional pop star and performs her song "Dive In".

Other artists heard in the show include The Beach Boys, The Penguins, Howie Day, John Mayer, Ryan Adams, Blink-182, Maroon 5, and Lifehouse.

==== Soundtrack ====
Summerland

Soundtrack album by Various artists
- Released: March 19, 2005
- Genre: Soundtrack
- Length: 41:40
- Label: Image Entertainment

On March 19, 2005, a soundtrack was released featuring music from both seasons of the show. It included the opening theme as well as a song by cast member Jesse McCartney, "Get Your Shine On", which also appeared on his first album and was released as a single.

Track listing

1. "Undertow" – Bowling For Soup
2. "General Attitude" – Collective Soul
3. "All Downhill from Here" – New Found Glory
4. "Get Your Shine On" – Jesse McCartney
5. "Feel So Free" – Ivy
6. "The Crying" – Kristian Leontiou
7. "My Paper Heart" – The All-American Rejects
8. "Struggle" – Ringside
9. "Try" – Lisa Loeb
10. "Alive" – Kenny Wayne Shepherd
11. "My Way Home" – Citizen Cope
12. "Beautiful Day" – Steve Plunkett

== Episodes ==
Season	Episodes	Originally released	
Season	Episodes	First released	Last released
1	13	June 1, 2004	August 17, 2004
2	13	February 28, 2005	July 18, 2005

=== Season 1 (2004) ===
No. overall	No. in season	Title	Directed by	Written by	Original release date	Prod. code
1	1	"Pilot"	Ian Toynton	Stephen Tolkin	June 1, 2004	40384-001
The series starts with Ava Gregory, a fashion designer living in California with her three roommates, Susannah, Johnny, and Jay. Her successful life comes to an unexpected halt when she gains custody of her two nephews, Bradin and Derrick, and her niece, Nikki, after the tragic deaths of their parents. This causes Ava to move them from rural Hogarth County, Kansas, to the fast-paced shores of Playa Linda, California. Due to the recent upheaval, this causes them all to encounter problems on their first night, as emotions are put to the test.
2	2	"And So the Day Begins"	Ian Toynton	Stephen Tolkin	June 1, 2004	40384-002
Bradin learns to adapt to the change by taking up surfing. Nikki tries to take on a "mother figure" role for her brothers, being hesitant to accept Ava and the others as her new guardians. Derrick attempts to give his mother a birthday present in Heaven after being convinced by a new friend to try an ancient Mayan ritual. Meanwhile, overwhelmed by their changing living situation, Johnny, Jay, and Susannah consider moving out, nearly leaving Ava to raise the kids on her own.
3	3	"Fireworks"	Harry Winer	Jon Cowan & Robert L. Rovner	June 8, 2004	40384-003
Ava falls for Kyle, a recently divorced man, but their dating life becomes complicated when she learns that he is the father of Nikki's new crush, Cameron. Meanwhile, Bradin's efforts to protect Erika from a guy—Tanner—with questionable intentions don't go as smoothly as possible.
4	4	"Into My Life"	Matt Shakman	Katie Botel	June 15, 2004	40384-004
Ava discovers marijuana in Bradin's backpack. The realty office takes up all of Johnny's time, causing him to break his promise to Derrick. Nikki's blooming relationship with Cameron takes a bumpy road when it's tested because Derrick needs Cameron's help with his hitting.
5	5	"The Grass Is Greener Than You Think"	Peter O'Fallon	Denitria Harris-Lawrence	June 22, 2004	40384-005
At the roommates' annual summer luau party, relationships are started, rekindled, and ended. Ava learns a terrible secret about why Johnny broke up with her years ago. Susanna pretends to be involved with Jay to ward off advances from her ex-boyfriend, and Nikki believes she must seduce Cameron to keep him interested in her and away from his ex-girlfriend, Amber.
6	6	"Big Waves"	David Petrarca	Craig Machen	June 29, 2004	40384-006
Jay is upset that his old knee injury is keeping him from competing in the local surfing competition but Erika has plans to get him in the event. Meanwhile, feeling overwhelmed by the disarray in the house, Ava asks Johnny and Susannah to help her organize things but no one can agree on how much structure is needed. Susannah and Ava organize a fashion shoot with a photographer who had a one-night stand with Johnny.
7	7	"To Thine Self Be True"	Timothy Busfield	Gay Walch	July 6, 2004	40384-007
When Derrick's friend finds a nude picture of Ava and takes it home with him, Ava must explain to his mother how he got it. Meanwhile, Bradin goes to Jay and Johnny for advice when he considers having sex with Sarah for the first time, but is then confused when he sees Sarah on a date with another guy the next night. Nikki's possessiveness begins to strain her relationship with Cameron. Bradin soon meets a Midwest girl named Callie who has more in common with him than he thought.
8	8	"Secrets"	Harry Winer	Jon Cowan & Robert L. Rovner	July 13, 2004	40384-008
Ava becomes concerned about Bradin's relationship with his wild girlfriend Sarah after they get caught by the police jetskiing recklessly around the pier. Bradin considers breaking up with her but finds it harder to do than he thought it would be. Erika is caught off-guard when a former boyfriend shows up, which is pretty obvious, as Nikki observes while talking to her. Meanwhile, Derrick misinterprets a friendly embrace between Susannah and Johnny on a camping trip.
9	9	"Skipping School"	Steve Miner	Graham Yost	July 20, 2004	40384-009
Ava begins to think that it might be in Nikki's best interest to skip her last year of junior high and go straight to high school, but Nikki disagrees. Sarah invites Bradin to run away with her to Mexico, but he soon discovers that she's attempting to get out of going away to a strict boarding school. Erika's estranged mother shows up unannounced and attempts to get Erika to leave Jay and Playa Linda to come home to live with her.
10	10	"Kicking and Screaming"	Peter O'Fallon	Denitria Harris-Lawrence	July 27, 2004	40384-010
Erika moves in with Jay after she gets kicked out of her apartment. Elsewhere, Susannah and Ava need a backer for their clothing line to keep their business going. Johnny and Ava rekindle old feelings after chaperoning Derrick and Martha on their date.
11	11	"Life in a Fishbowl"	Jeff Bleckner	Stephen Tolkin	August 3, 2004	40384-011
Johnny realizes his feelings for Ava when he sees her on a date with Nikki's principal, Dr. O'Keefe. Meanwhile, Bradin considers taking his friendship with Callie to the next level but is confused when Sarah comes back to town.
12	12	"Yummy Mummy"	Harry Winer	Katie Botel	August 10, 2004	40384-012
Amber and Nikki, now friends, are very shocked when Cameron shows up with a new girlfriend, Jordan. Bradin begins to practice with other guys by trying out for a surfing team with good members Zack and Lucas, but things get complicated when he finds out Tanner is Lucas' brother. Also, Ava is interviewing people for the jobs of sales, marketing, etc., for her fashion line.
13	13	"On the Last Night of Summer"	Robert Duncan McNeill	Stephen Tolkin	August 17, 2004	40384-013
Relationships are reconsidered. Ava has doubts about getting serious with Simon because she still has feelings for Johnny; Johnny may make a choice that will take Ava away from him for good; Susannah reconsiders quitting her partnership with Ava; Jay has second thoughts about Erika moving in with him when she wants to redecorate his place; Bradin is confused by Callie's hot and cold actions, and Nikki suffers when she remembers her parents' death.

=== Season 2 (2005) ===
No. overall	No. in season	Title	Directed by	Written by	Original release date	Prod. code
14	1	"The Wisdom to Know the Difference"	Robert Duncan McNeill	Remi Aubuchon	March 8, 2005	201
After months of being gone from Playa Linda, Johnny returns home and is shocked to learn that Ava asked Simon to marry her. Nikki becomes very upset that Ava has asked Simon to marry her since she feels Ava is meant for Johnny. On the other hand, Derrick is very excited at the news because his family will now be complete. When Bradin's coach questions his effort on the surf team, he considers trying performance-enhancing drugs to help him be better.
15	2	"I Am the Walrus"	David Jackson	Shane Brennan	March 15, 2005	202
Three FBI agents come in and they are looking for Susannah and everything Dubois International-related; Bradin is suspended from his high school surf team then has to go to the hospital due to a drug overdose. Meanwhile, Nikki is persuaded by Amber to tryout for cheerleading but does not make it while Amber gets to be captain. Amber asks Nikki if she really wants to be on the team, leading Nikki to become the school's mascot.
16	3	"Sledgehammer"	Harry Winer	Lon Diamond	March 22, 2005	203
Nikki helps Cameron run for student president of their middle school, but Cameron does not want to follow Nikki's plan and winds up embarrassing and annoying her. Ava is angry when she learns Bradin is skipping his tutoring after returning to his surf team. Jay sides with Bradin, which causes a rift between the two. Mona questions Johnny about Ava. And a special someone just also may move back to Playa Linda.
17	4	"Pick Nik"	Janice Cooke-Leonard	Katie Botel	March 29, 2005	204
At school, Derrick talks with his friends about a father/son sailing race where all of his friends are going to compete with their dads, but Derrick will be with Ava. Two of his friends say Derrick can not compete with Ava, which makes Derrick very upset and he begins to fight with them, sending all the boys to the principal's office. The secretary calls Susannah, Johnny, Jay, Ava, and Simon to pick Derrick up. Derrick tells Ava he doesn't want to race with her as she's not a father, causing everyone to become more distant for Ava and Simon to work it out. Nikki becomes frustrated with Cameron and their school elections.
18	5	"Mr. & Mrs. Who"	Harry Winer	Linda McGibney	April 5, 2005	205
Derrick is with the ambulance after falling off his skateboard with Johnny. Simon feels the sudden urge to rush the wedding and Ava is not sure if that's exactly what she wants but will not admit it. Nikki has an angry outburst at a big family dinner about Ava’s old feelings, putting Johnny on the spot. Mona's soon-to-be-ex-husband comes to town to sign the divorce papers.
19	6	"The Pleiades"	Robert Duncan McNeill	Joan Binder Weiss	April 12, 2005	206
After the wedding debacle, Ava seems strangely calm and wants to start a wedding line. Nikki feels very guilty about Ava and Simon's breakup and is constantly reminded that it is her fault. Callie considers dumping Bradin. Mona warns Ava to stay away from Johnny.
20	7	"Where There's a Will, There's a Wave"	Peter O'Fallon	Tim Davis	April 19, 2005	207
Ava, Susannah, and Colby discuss designing a wedding dress for a pop star named Gigi to help give with their clothing line exposure. Ava admits her feelings for Johnny. Bradin breaks up with Callie after realizing his feelings for Erika and sees that Callie seems happier with other people.
21	8	"Leaving Playa Linda"	Jack Clements	Patrick Sean Smith	April 26, 2005	208
Ava is disappointed to learn that Johnny and Mona have moved in together, and decides that it's time to finally admit her feelings for him. Meanwhile, after Nikki falls for an older guy in high school and finds out that he is gay, she realizes that she still cares for Cameron. When the family sees how strong Bradin's feelings are for Erika, they advise him against a relationship with her due to their age gap, and encourage him to leave town to join a surf tour with Jay as his chaperone.
22	9	"Signs"	Harry Winer	Shane Brennan & Lon Diamond	May 3, 2005	209
Several months have passed, and Bradin, who has just returned from his surf tour in Hawaii, is asked by his sponsor to replace Jay with a top sports manager who can turn him into a major media star. Meanwhile, Nikki learns something troubling about Cameron's home life, and Ava returns from a business trip to Milan when she hears that something has happened to Mona. Old flames reignite between Ava and Johnny, although it may be too much for Johnny.
23	10	"The Space Between Us"	Peter O'Fallon	Rick Muirragui	May 10, 2005	210
Bradin comes home after the surf tour abroad with Bryce, another surfer, who encourages him to drink and spend his money irresponsibly. Jay meets Isabelle, a single mother interested in taking surf lessons in order to relate to her son. Meanwhile, when Nikki's poem is chosen for publication, she is asked to read it in front of an audience and goes to Johnny and Amber to help her face her fears. After learning of Bradin and Nikki's troubles, Ava returns home from her European business trip.
24	11	"Safe House"	Allison Liddi-Brown	Linda McGibney	May 17, 2005	211
When Bryce's sister Faith comes to town, Bradin becomes attracted to her even after Bryce warns him to stay away. Ava asks Johnny to move back into the house. When Nikki goes to visit Cameron, his dad throws him back into the house. Nikki talks to Ava about what she saw and Cameron soon starts staying at their house, until Kyle, Cameron's father, comes looking for him. Nikki suspects that Kyle abuses him.
25	12	"Careful What You Wish For"	Robert Duncan McNeill	Brenda Lilly & Hollis Rich	May 24, 2005	212
When Bradin saves his friend Bryce's life after a surfing accident, Bradin is offered a chance at a career. Jay reports a robbery in his shop that is closer to home than he hoped for. Lastly, Susannah has problems of her own in her new serious relationship.
26	13	"What's Past is Prologue"	Janice Cooke-Leonard	Katie Botel	May 31, 2005	213
Bradin becomes involved in a scuffle with a reporter at a Wave Crasher promotion. Derrick's friends find Bradin's new "bad boy" image cool and Derrick basks in Bradin's reflected glory. Isabel tells Jay that she is pregnant and together they decide to be parents. Nikki conspires with Colby to get Johnny and Ava together and Erika and Bradin discuss their future possibilities.

== Broadcast history ==
=== Cancellation ===
On May 15, 2005, The WB released early information on their 2005–2006 season. Summerland, along with eight other shows, were canceled. Jesse McCartney responded to the cancellation in an interview, saying the show was "in a crazy time slot and … the writers were having trouble, and it was just a bad call."

=== Syndication ===
The series has been syndicated on The N and Universal HD in the United States. It also aired overseas on Ten Network in Australia, Living in the United Kingdom and Ireland, TV2 in Norway, M6 in France, and on MBC 4 in the Middle East. In Spain, Summerland (which retains its English language title) has been used as a filler during the summer months. In July 2008, Telecinco aired all of the episodes again in the 9 a.m. time slot, the same time slot in which it aired in the summer of 2007. It also used to air in 2013 on Sweden's channel 5, kanal5, however only on weekend mornings.

== Awards and nominations ==
Year	Award	Result	Category	Recipient
2005	Teen Choice Awards	Nominated	Choice TV Actor: Drama	Jesse McCartney
2005	Young Artist Awards	Nominated	Best Performance in a TV Series (Comedy or Drama) - Leading Young Actor	Jesse McCartney
2005	Young Artist Awards	Nominated	Best Family Television Series (Drama)	-
2005	Young Artist Awards	Won	Best Performance in a TV Series (Comedy or Drama) - Leading Young Actress	Kay Panabaker
2006	NAACP Image Awards	Nominated	Outstanding Directing in a Dramatic Series	Janice Cooke-Leonard
2006	PRISM Awards	Won	Performance in a Drama Series Storyline	Lori Loughlin
