= Because You Live =

Single by Jesse McCartney

from the album The Princess Diaries 2: Royal Engagement: Original Soundtrack and Beautiful Soul
- Released: September 2005
- Length: 3:18
- Label: Walt Disney; Hollywood
- Songwriters: Chris Braide; Desmond Child; Andreas Carlsson
- Producers: Andreas Carlsson; Desmond Child

Jesse McCartney singles chronology
"Get Your Shine On" (2005)	"Because You Live" (2005)	"Right Where You Want Me" (2006)

Music video
- "Because You Live" on YouTube

"Because You Live" is a song recorded by Jesse McCartney written by Chris Braide, Andreas Carlsson and Desmond Child. It was released as the third single from his debut album, Beautiful Soul, in 2005 in North America and Europe while "Get Your Shine On" was released as the third single in Australia. The song peaked at number three in Italy.

== Cover versions ==
It was remixed by Sergio Dall'Ora and Luca Degani with new vocals performed by Cristian De Leo under the alias "Miky MC". This remixed version of the original song was released on Super Eurobeat Volume 182 available in Japanese markets in CD form or as digital download through Avex Trax's mu-mo download service.

== Music video ==
There are two versions of "Because You Live". The first version is the promo video that features Jesse McCartney in a room singing. The second video for "Because You Live" was shot in The State Theatre Sydney, Australia, which features him performing the song, traveling somewhere, walking in Hyde Park, Sydney Australia and backstage with his fans.

== Formats and track listings ==
- Italian CD (1st track replaced by the "Beautiful Soul" radio edit)
1. . Because You Live (Radio Edit) - 3:18
2. . Get Your Shine On (Single Version) - 3:12
3. . Beautiful Soul (Drew Ferrente Mix) - 3:34

== Charts ==
=== Weekly charts ===
Chart (2006)	Peak position
Italy (FIMI)	3

=== Year-end charts ===
Chart (2006)	Position
Italy (FIMI)	20

== Release history ==
Release dates and formats for "Because You Live"
Region	Date	Format	Label(s)	Ref.
United States	September 13, 2005	Mainstream airplay	Hollywood	
