= Get Your Shine On =

Get Your Shine On may refer to:

- "Get Your Shine On" (Jesse McCartney song), 2005
- "Get Your Shine On" (Florida Georgia Line song), 2013
- "Get Your Shine On!!", a song by B.G. from his 1997 album It's All on U, Vol. 1
- "Get Your Shine On", a song by Birdman from his 2005 album Fast Money
