= Something (To Make You Feel Alright) =

Single by Silosonic
- Released: 2005
- Label: Zip Records
- Songwriter(s): Alex Marsh; Julia and Company
- Producer(s): Alex Marsh

"Something (To Make You Feel Alright)" is a song by British DJ Alex Marsh, under the name of Silosonic, featuring vocals by Beverley Skeete. Released in 2005, the song peaked at number 36 on the ARIA Charts.

It was number 1 on the ARIA Club Chart for seven weeks.

== Track listings ==
Australian single (ZIP004CD)

1. "Something (To Make You Feel Alright)" (Breaking Down Radio Edit) – 2:55
2. "Something (To Make You Feel Alright)" (Buzz Kitchen Radio Edit) – 3:25
3. "Something (To Make You Feel Alright)" (Original Mix) – 6:02
4. "Something (To Make You Feel Alright)" (Breaking Down Mix) – 6:02
5. "Something (To Make You Feel Alright)" (Dirty South Mix) – 7:12
6. "Something (To Make You Feel Alright)" (Buzz Kitchen Mix) – 7:31
7. "Something (To Make You Feel Alright)" (Kandid Mix) – 6:01

== Charts ==
Chart performance for "Something (To Make You Feel Alright)"
| Chart (2005) | Peak position |
|---|---|
| Australia (ARIA) | 36 |

== See also ==
- List of number-one club tracks of 2005 (Australia)
