= She's No You =

Single by Jesse McCartney

from the album Beautiful Soul
- B-side: "Take Your Sweet Time"
- Released: April 5, 2005 (U.S. radio); June 7, 2005 (Australia)
- Recorded: 2004
- Genre: Pop rock; R&B
- Length: 3:35 (album and single versions); 3:05 (radio edit)
- Label: Hollywood
- Songwriters: Matthew Gerrard; Jesse McCartney; Robbie Nevil
- Producers: Matthew Gerrard; Chad Hugo (remix)

Jesse McCartney singles chronology
"Beautiful Soul" (2004)	"She's No You" (2005)	"Get Your Shine On" (2005)

Music video
- "Jesse McCartney – She's No You (Music Video)" on YouTube

"She's No You" is the second single in Jesse McCartney's debut album, Beautiful Soul. The single was released on April 5, 2005. McCartney, who co-wrote the song, says he was in a caffeine "buzz" when he wrote it, hence the fast pace it has. The radio edit was packaged into the 2006 Hannah Montana soundtrack CD. The same year, a remix produced by The Neptunes was included on the soundtrack album That's So Raven Too!. Another version of this remix also contains a guest verse from rapper Fabolous.

== Composition ==
"She's No You" is set to the tempo of 180 beats per minute.

== Music video ==
The entire video for "She's No You" was shot in black and white and was shown on TRL. It also stars his ex-girlfriend Katie Cassidy, who he was dating at the time. The video is basically Jesse trying to find Katie, walking down streets, crossing roads, etc. Near the end of the video, he finds her. She runs up to him and the two enjoy a lengthy kiss. They later hail a taxi and drive home.

Another video is available for the song. It shows Jesse singing with a band and some scenes show him singing on a couch with two women.

== Track listing ==
CD version 1

1. "She's No You" (single version) – 3:35
2. "Take Your Sweet Time" (Sugar Mix) – 4:04

CD version 2

1. "She's No You" (radio edit) – 3:05
2. "She's No You" (Neptunes Remix featuring Fabolous) – 3:37
3. "She's No You" (Neptunes Remix) – 3:05
4. "She's No You" (video; New Zealand only) – 3:16

Remixes 12"

1. "She's No You" (Neptunes Remix featuring Fabolous) – 3:37
2. "She's No You" (instrumental) – 3:36
3. "She's No You" (a cappella) – 3:35
4. "She's No You" (radio edit) – 3:05

Promo

1. "She's No You" (album version) – 3:35
2. "She's No You" (video download) – 3:16

== Charts performance ==
The song debuted on the Billboard Hot 100 chart on May 21, 2005, at number 91. The single fared better on the Pop 100, peaking at No. 41. "She's No You" peaked at No. 10 on the Australian ARIA Singles Chart and No. 16 in New Zealand.

== Charts ==
Chart (2005)	Peak position
Australia (ARIA)	10
Belgium (Ultratip Bubbling Under Flanders)	6
New Zealand (Recorded Music NZ)	16
US Billboard Hot 100	91
US Pop Airplay (Billboard)	24

=== Year-end charts ===
Chart (2005)	Position
Australia (ARIA)	97

== Release history ==
Release dates and formats for "She's No You"
Region	Date	Format	Label(s)	Ref.
United States	April 5, 2005	Mainstream airplay	Hollywood	
