= Beautiful Soul (Jesse McCartney album) =

2004 studio album by Jesse McCartney

Studio album by Jesse McCartney
- Released: September 28, 2004
- Recorded: July 2003 – August 2004
- Genres: Pop; pop rock; teen pop; R&B
- Length: 46:40
- Label: Hollywood
- Producers: Matthew Gerrard; Andy Dodd; Adam Watts; Greg Wells; Adam Anders; Peer Astrom; Jason Blume; Chris Braide; Andreas Carlsson; Desmond Child; Boots Ottestad

Jesse McCartney chronology
Beautiful Soul (2004)	Right Where You Want Me (2006)

Alternative cover
- UK cover

Alternative cover
- Philippines cover

Singles from Beautiful Soul
- 1. "Beautiful Soul" Released: August 12, 2004; 2. "She's No You" Released: April 5, 2005; 3. "Get Your Shine On" Released: September 5, 2005; 4. "Because You Live" Released: September 2005

Professional ratings
Review scores
Source	Rating
AllMusic	3/5 stars
Common Sense Media	4/5 stars

Beautiful Soul is the debut studio album by American singer/songwriter Jesse McCartney. It was released on September 28, 2004, through Hollywood Records. The album was a success in the United States and Australia, going platinum in both countries, and in Canada, where it was certified gold. It spawned McCartney's first top-20 single, "Beautiful Soul".

"Come to Me" is a re-recording of "Let Me Be the One" by Plus One from the 2002 album Obvious.

== Singles ==
1. "Beautiful Soul" was released on August 12, 2004. Radio Disney aired it earlier before the single was officially released. It peaked at number 16 on the Billboard Hot 100 chart. It was later certified gold by in the United States and platinum in Australia.
2. "She's No You" was released on April 5, 2005. It was not as successful as "Beautiful Soul" peaking at number 91 on the Billboard Hot 100 chart, but it did better at the Pop 100 chart peaking at number 41.
3. "Get Your Shine On" was released on September 5, 2005. It was released as the third single of the album in Australia and New Zealand. It was released as a Radio Disney single in early 2005 and is featured in Kim Possible: So The Drama. The song "Why Don't You Kiss Her" is also featured in the film.
4. "Because You Live" was released in September 2005. It was released as the third single of the album in North America and Europe. It was released also as a Radio Disney single, and is featured on the Radio Disney Jams, Vol. 7 CD. It was also featured in the end credits of The Princess Diaries 2: Royal Engagement.

== Track listings ==
Standard edition
No.	Title	Writer(s)	Producer(s)	Length
1.	"She's No You"	Matthew Gerrard; Robbie Nevil; Jesse McCartney	Matthew Gerrard	3:35
2.	"Beautiful Soul"	Adam Watts; Andy Dodd	Adam Watts; Andy Dodd; Greg Wells; Sherry Kondor (voc.); Ginger McCartney (voc.)	3:35
3.	"Get Your Shine On"	Gerrard; Nevil; J. McCartney	Gerrard	3:13
4.	"Take Your Sweet Time"	Watts; Dodd	Watts; Dodd; Kondor (voc.); G. McCartney (voc.)	4:04
5.	"Without U"	Adam Anders; Per Astrom	Wells; G. McCartney (ex.); Kondor (ex.); Jay Landers (ex.); Jon Lind (ex.)	3:12
6.	"Why Don't You Kiss Her?"	Jason Blume; Andrew Fromm	G. McCartney; Kondor; Andrew Gold	3:23
7.	"That Was Then"	Gerrard; Nevil; J. McCartney	Gerrard	3:45
8.	"Come to Me"	Gerrard; Trina Harmon; Tyler Hayes	Gerrard	3:50
9.	"What's Your Name?"	Gerrard; Nevil; J. McCartney	Gerrard	3:32
10.	"Because You Live"	Desmond Child; Andreas Carlsson; Chris Braide	Desmond Child; Andreas Carlsson	3:19
11.	"Why Is Love So Hard to Find?"	Gerrard; Andrew Tierney; Michael Tierney; Bridget Benenate	Gerrard	4:11
12.	"The Stupid Things"	Robin Thicke	Gerrard	3:37
13.	"Good Life" (hidden track on North American pressings)	Kristian Ottestad	Gold; Kondor; G. McCartney	3:20

Taiwan bonus tracks
No.	Title	Writer(s)	Producer(s)	Length
13.	"The Best Day of My Life"	David Katz; Robert Palmer; Lindy Robbins	Charlton Pettus; G. McCartney (voc.)(ex.); Kondor (voc.)(ex.); Landers (ex.)	3:13
14.	"The Stupid Things" (acoustic version)	Thicke	Gerrard	3:37

Japan close up bonus tracks
No.	Title	Writer(s)	Producer(s)	Length
13.	"Take Your Sweet Time Sugar Mix"	Watts; Dodd	Robbie Buchanan; G. McCartney (ex.); Kondor (ex.); Landers (ex.)	4:04
14.	"The Best Day of My Life"	Katz; Palmer; Robbins	Pettus; G. McCartney (voc.)(ex.); Kondor (voc.)(ex.); Landers (ex.)	3:13
15.	"The Stupid Things" (acoustic version)	Thicke	Gerrard	3:37
16.	"Good Life"	Ottestaad	Gold; Kondor; G. McCartney	3:20
17.	"Beautiful Soul" (DF Mix)	Watts; Dodd	Watts; Dodd; Wells; Kondor (voc.); G. McCartney (voc.)	3:31
18.	"She's No You" (Neptunes Remix) (featuring Fabolous)	Gerrard; Nevil; J. McCartney	Chad Hugo	3:38
19.	"She's No You" (Neptunes Remix)	Gerrard; Nevil; J. McCartney	Hugo	3:07
20.	"Beautiful Soul" (Stripped Raw and Real)	Watts; Dodd	Steve Remote; John Zonars (add.)	3:35
21.	"She's No You" (Stripped Raw and Real)	Gerrard; Nevil; J. McCartney	Remote; Zonars (add.)	2:47
22.	"When You Wish Upon a Star"	Ned Washington; Leigh Harline	Wells; G. McCartney (ex.); Kondor (ex.); Landers (ex.)	3:02

== Charts ==
=== Weekly charts ===
Weekly chart performance for Beautiful Soul
Chart (2004–2006)	Peak position
Australian Albums (ARIA)	5
Austrian Albums (Ö3 Austria)	28
Belgian Albums (Ultratop Flanders)	81
Dutch Albums (Album Top 100)	87
German Albums (Offizielle Top 100)	16
Irish Albums (IRMA)	88
Italian Albums (FIMI)	3
Japanese Albums (Oricon)	154
New Zealand Albums (RMNZ)	17
Scottish Albums (Official Charts)	48
Swiss Albums (Schweizer Hitparade)	50
UK Albums (Official Charts)	53
US Billboard 200	15

=== Japan close up edition ===
Chart performance for Japan close up edition of Beautiful Soul
Chart (2006)	Peak position
Japanese Albums (Oricon)	192

=== Year-end charts ===
Year-end chart performance for Beautiful Soul
Chart (2005)	Position
Australian Albums (ARIA)	48
US Billboard 200	59

== Certifications ==
Certifications for Beautiful Soul
Region	Certification	Certified units/sales
Australia (ARIA)	Platinum	70,000^{^}
Canada (Music Canada)	Gold	50,000^{^}
New Zealand (RMNZ)	3× Gold	22,500^{^}
Taiwan	—	45,000 (Note: Taiwanese estimated sales as of January 2006.)
United States (RIAA)	Platinum	1,000,000^{^}
^{^} Shipments figures based on certification alone.

== Disney Artist Karaoke Series ==
Artist Karaoke Series: Jesse McCartney

Studio album (Karaoke) by Jesse McCartney
- Released: September 27, 2005
- Genre: Pop
- Label: Walt Disney

Artist Karaoke Series: Jesse McCartney is a karaoke album of songs by Jesse himself, released on September 27, 2005 through Buena Vista. The album features karaoke versions of six tracks from the Beautiful Soul album, as well as two non-album tracks called "Good Life" and "Best Day of My Life".

Artist Karaoke Series: Jesse McCartney track listing
No.	Title	Length
1.	"Beautiful Soul"
2.	"She's No You"
3.	"Because You Live"
4.	"Good Life"
5.	"Best Day of My Life"
6.	"What's Your Name?"
7.	"Get Your Shine On"
8.	"That Was Then"
