= List of number-one singles of 2005 (Australia) =

ARIA Charts number-one singles of 2005 < 2004 2006 >

Other Australian number-one charts of 2005
- albums
- dance singles

Top Australian singles and albums of 2005
- Triple J Hottest 100
- top 25 singles
- top 25 albums

These are the number-one songs of 2005 in the Australian ARIA singles chart.

== Chart history ==
Key
The yellow background indicates the #1 song on ARIA's End of Year Singles Chart of 2005.

Songs reaching No. 1, with artists, listed by chart week
Week beginning	Song	Artist
2 January	"The Prayer"	Anthony Callea
9 January	"The Prayer"	Anthony Callea
16 January	"The Prayer"	Anthony Callea
23 January	"Nasty Girl"	Nitty
30 January	"Nasty Girl"	Nitty
6 February	"Over and Over"	Nelly featuring Tim McGraw
13 February	"Over and Over"	Nelly featuring Tim McGraw
20 February	"Over and Over"	Nelly featuring Tim McGraw
27 February	"Over and Over"	Nelly featuring Tim McGraw
6 March	"Over and Over"	Nelly featuring Tim McGraw
13 March	"Almost Here"	Brian McFadden and Delta Goodrem
20 March	"Rain"/"Bridge over Troubled Water"	Anthony Callea
27 March	"Rain"/"Bridge over Troubled Water"	Anthony Callea
3 April	"Beautiful Soul"	Jesse McCartney
10 April	"Beautiful Soul"	Jesse McCartney
17 April	"Beautiful Soul"	Jesse McCartney
24 April	"Beautiful Soul"	Jesse McCartney
1 May	"Signs"	Snoop Dogg featuring Justin Timberlake and Charlie Wilson
8 May	"Signs"	Snoop Dogg featuring Justin Timberlake and Charlie Wilson
15 May	"Switch"	Will Smith
22 May	"Don't Phunk with My Heart"	The Black Eyed Peas
29 May	"Hollaback Girl"	Gwen Stefani
5 June	"Don't Phunk with My Heart"	Black Eyed Peas
12 June	"Don't Phunk with My Heart"	Black Eyed Peas
19 June	"Incomplete"	Backstreet Boys
26 June	"We Belong Together"	Mariah Carey
3 July	"We Belong Together"	Mariah Carey
10 July	"Lonely"	Akon
17 July	"Lonely"	Akon
24 July	"Axel F"	Crazy Frog
31 July	"Axel F"	Crazy Frog
7 August	"Axel F"	Crazy Frog
14 August	"Lonely"	Akon
21 August	"Ghetto Gospel"	2Pac featuring Elton John
28 August	"Don't Cha"	The Pussycat Dolls featuring Busta Rhymes
4 September	"Don't Cha"	The Pussycat Dolls featuring Busta Rhymes
11 September	"Don't Cha"	The Pussycat Dolls featuring Busta Rhymes
18 September	"Don't Cha"	The Pussycat Dolls featuring Busta Rhymes
25 September	"Don't Cha"	The Pussycat Dolls featuring Busta Rhymes
2 October	"Shine"	Shannon Noll
9 October	"Don't Cha"	Pussycat Dolls featuring Busta Rhymes
16 October	"Don't Cha"	Pussycat Dolls featuring Busta Rhymes
23 October	"Gold Digger"	Kanye West featuring Jamie Foxx
30 October	"Gold Digger"	Kanye West featuring Jamie Foxx
6 November	"Gold Digger"	Kanye West featuring Jamie Foxx
13 November	"Hung Up"	Madonna
20 November	"My Humps"	The Black Eyed Peas
27 November	"My Humps"	The Black Eyed Peas
4 December	"Maybe Tonight"	Kate DeAraugo
11 December	"Maybe Tonight"	Kate DeAraugo
18 December	"Wasabi"/"Eye of the Tiger"	Lee Harding
25 December	"Wasabi"/"Eye of the Tiger"	Lee Harding

== Number-one artists ==
Position	Artist	Weeks #1
1	Pussycat Dolls	7
1	Busta Rhymes (as featuring)	7
2	Anthony Callea	5
2	Nelly	5
2	Tim McGraw (as featuring)	5
2	The Black Eyed Peas	5
3	Jesse McCartney	4
4	Akon	3
4	Crazy Frog	3
4	Kanye West	3
4	Jamie Foxx (as featuring)	3
5	Nitty	2
5	Snoop Dogg	2
5	Justin Timberlake (as featuring)	2
5	Charlie Wilson (as featuring)	2
5	Mariah Carey	2
5	Kate DeAraugo	2
5	Lee Harding	2
6	Brian McFadden	1
6	Delta Goodrem	1
6	Will Smith	1
6	Gwen Stefani	1
6	Backstreet Boys	1
6	2Pac	1
6	Elton John (as featuring)	1
6	Shannon Noll	1
6	Madonna	1
