= List of number-one dance singles of 2005 (Australia) =

ARIA Charts number-one dance singles of 2005 < 2004 2006 >

Other Australian number-one charts of 2005
- albums
- singles

Top Australian singles and albums of 2005
- Triple J Hottest 100
- top 25 singles
- top 25 albums

The ARIA Dance Chart is a chart that ranks the best-performing dance singles of Australia. It is published by Australian Recording Industry Association (ARIA), an organisation who collect music data for the weekly ARIA Charts. To be eligible to appear on the chart, the recording must be a single, and be "predominantly of a dance nature, or with a featured track of a dance nature, or included in the ARIA Club Chart or a comparable overseas chart".

== Chart history ==
Issue date	Song	Artist(s)	Reference
3 January	"What You Waiting For?"	Gwen Stefani	
10 January	"What You Waiting For?"	Gwen Stefani	
17 January	"What You Waiting For?"	Gwen Stefani	
24 January	"What You Waiting For?"	Gwen Stefani	
31 January	"What You Waiting For?"	Gwen Stefani	
7 February	"Nasty Girl"	Inaya Day	
14 February	"Nasty Girl"	Inaya Day	
21 February	"Nasty Girl"	Inaya Day	
28 February	"Nasty Girl"	Inaya Day	
7 March	"Midas Touch"	Midnight Star	
14 March	"Midas Touch"	Midnight Star	
21 March	"Midas Touch"	Midnight Star	
28 March	"Midas Touch"	Midnight Star	
4 April	"Midas Touch"	Midnight Star	
11 April	"Ooh Ahh"	Tamara Jaber	
18 April	"Giving You Up"	Kylie Minogue	
25 April	"Ooh Ahh"	Tamara Jaber	
2 May	"Ooh Ahh"	Tamara Jaber	
9 May	"I Like the Way"	BodyRockers	
16 May	"I Like the Way"	BodyRockers	
23 May	"I Like the Way"	BodyRockers	
30 May	"I Like the Way"	BodyRockers	
6 June	"I Like the Way"	BodyRockers	
13 June	"I Like the Way"	BodyRockers	
20 June	"Voodoo Child"	Rogue Traders	
27 June	"Voodoo Child"	Rogue Traders	
3 July	"Voodoo Child"	Rogue Traders	
10 July	"Voodoo Child"	Rogue Traders	
17 July	"Voodoo Child"	Rogue Traders	
24 July	"Axel F"	Crazy Frog	
1 August	"Axel F"	Crazy Frog	
8 August	"Axel F"	Crazy Frog	
15 August	"Axel F"	Crazy Frog	
22 August	"Axel F"	Crazy Frog	
29 August	"Axel F"	Crazy Frog	
5 September	"Axel F"	Crazy Frog	
12 September	"Axel F"	Crazy Frog	
19 September	"Axel F"	Crazy Frog	
26 September	"Axel F"	Crazy Frog	
3 October	"Axel F"	Crazy Frog	
10 October	"Axel F"	Crazy Frog	
17 October	"Way to Go!"	Rogue Traders	
24 October	"PopCorn"	Crazy Frog	
31 October	"Way to Go!"	Rogue Traders	
7 November	"Way to Go!"	Rogue Traders	
14 November	"Hung Up"	Madonna	
21 November	"Hung Up"	Madonna	
28 November	"Hung Up"	Madonna	
5 December	"Hung Up"	Madonna	
12 December	"Jingle Bells/U Can't Touch This"	Crazy Frog	
19 December	"Jingle Bells/U Can't Touch This"	Crazy Frog	
26 December	"Hung Up"	Madonna	

== Number-one artists ==
Position	Artist	Weeks at No. 1
1	Crazy Frog	15
2	Rogue Traders	8
3	BodyRockers	6
4	Gwen Stefani	5
4	Madonna	5
4	Midnight Star	5
5	Inaya Day	4
6	Tamara Jaber	3
7	Kylie Minogue	1

== See also ==
- 2005 in music
- List of number-one singles of 2005 (Australia)
- List of number-one club tracks of 2005 (Australia)
