= Get Your Shine On (Jesse McCartney song) =

Single by Jesse McCartney

from the album Beautiful Soul and Ice Princess
- Released: September 5, 2005
- Recorded: 2004
- Genre: Pop
- Length: 3:12
- Label: Hollywood
- Songwriter(s): Matthew Gerrard; Robbie Nevil; Jesse McCartney
- Producer(s): Matthew Gerrard

Jesse McCartney singles chronology
"She's No You" (2005)	"Get Your Shine On" (2005)	"Because You Live" (2005)

Audio
- "Get Your Shine On" on YouTube

"Get Your Shine On" is the third single released from Jesse McCartney's debut album Beautiful Soul in Australia and New Zealand. "Because You Live" was released as the third single in North America and Europe. It peaked at #34 on the Australian ARIA Singles Chart. The song was featured in the 2004 film Fat Albert, the 2005 Disney film Kim Possible Movie: So the Drama, the 2005 Disney live action film Ice Princess and the CBS hit sitcom Two and a Half Men.

The song was featured on an episode of America's Funniest Home Videos (dated January 6, 2008) in a montage of Karate Mishaps.

An uncredited review in Brio & Beyond said that McCartney "oohs and aahs over a girl while encouraging her to dance more provocatively."

== Formats and track listings ==
1. "Get Your Shine On" (Single Version) – 3:12
2. "She's No You" (Neptunes Remix) - 3:05

== Charts ==
Chart (2005)	Peak position
Australia (ARIA)	34
