= List of top 25 singles for 2004 in Australia =

Top 25 singles of 2004 < 2003 2005 >

Other Australian top charts for 2004
- top 25 albums
- Triple J Hottest 100

Australian number-one charts of 2004
- albums
- singles
- dance singles

The following lists the top 25 singles of 2004 in Australia from the Australian Recording Industry Association (ARIA) End of Year singles chart. "What About Me" by Shannon Noll was the biggest song of the year, peaking at #1 for four weeks and staying in the top 50 for 14 weeks. The longest stay at #1 was by Maroon 5 with She Will Be Loved, and it stayed at number one for 5 weeks.

#	Title	Artist	Highest pos. reached	Weeks at No. 1
1.	"What About Me"	Shannon Noll	1	4
2.	"Left Outside Alone"	Anastacia	1	1
3.	"Black Betty"	Spiderbait	1	3
4.	"Milkshake"	Kelis	2	
5.	"I Don't Want You Back"	Eamon	1	4
6.	"Superstar"	Jamelia	1	1
7.	"My Immortal"	Evanescence	4	
8.	"These Kids"	Joel Turner	1	1
9.	"Shut Up"	The Black Eyed Peas	1	3
10.	"Suga Suga"	Baby Bash	3	
11.	"My Band"	D12	1	2
12.	"Behind Blue Eyes"	Limp Bizkit	4	
13.	"She Will Be Loved"	Maroon 5	1	5
14.	"With You"	Jessica Simpson	4	
15.	"Hey Ya!"	Outkast	1	2
16.	"I Don't Wanna Know"	Mario Winans	2	
17.	"Angel Eyes"	Paulini	1	3
18.	"Here Without You"	3 Doors Down	2	
19.	"Four to the Floor"	Starsailor	5	
20.	"Out of the Blue"	Delta Goodrem	1	3
21.	"So Beautiful"	Pete Murray	9	
22.	"Scar"	Missy Higgins	1	1
23.	"Leave (Get Out)"	JoJo	2	
24.	"Broken"	Seether feat. Amy Lee	4	
25.	"Listen with Your Heart"	Casey Donovan	1	2
26.	"What You Waiting For?"	Gwen Stefani	1	2
27.	"F.U.R.B. (Fuck You Right Back)"	Frankee	1	3
28.	"Yeah!"	Usher feat. Ludacris and Lil Jon	1	1
29.	"Turn Me On"	Kevin Lyttle	3	
30.	"Predictable"	Delta Goodrem	1	1
31.	"Burn"	Usher	2	
32.	"Perfect"	Simple Plan	6	
33.	"Trick Me"	Kelis	5	
34.	"Drive"	Shannon Noll	4	
35.	"Tipsy"	J-Kwon	5	
36.	"Just Lose It"	Eminem	1	1
37.	"When the War Is Over / One Night Without You"	Cosima	1	2
38.	"Toxic"	Britney Spears	1	2
39.	"One Call Away"	Chingy	5	
40.	"My Place / Flap Your Wings"	Nelly	1	1
41.	"Roses"	Outkast	2	
42.	"Hey Mama"	The Black Eyed Peas	4	
43.	"Lose My Breath"	Destiny's Child	3	
44.	"Let's Get It Started"	The Black Eyed Peas	2	
45.	"Be Faithful"	Fatman Scoop	5	
46.	"Call on Me"	Eric Prydz	2	
47.	"All I Need Is You"	Guy Sebastian	1	1
48.	"Car Wash"	Christina Aguilera and Missy Elliott	2	
49.	"These Words"	Natasha Bedingfield	5	
50.	"Thank You"	Jamelia	7	
51.	"Sick and Tired"	Anastacia	8	
52.	"Push Up"	Freestylers	2	
53.	"Somebody to Love"	Boogie Pimps	10	
54.	"Pieces of Me"	Ashlee Simpson	7	
55.	"What Chu Want"	J-Wess	10	
56.	"When You Say You Love Me"	Human Nature	7	
57.	"American Idiot"	Green Day	7	
58.	"The Reason"	Hoobastank	7	
59.	"Naughty Girl"	Beyoncé	9	
60.	"This Love"	Maroon 5	8	
61.	"Summer Rain"	Slinkee Minx	5	
62.	"My Happy Ending"	Avril Lavigne	6	
63.	"Figured You Out"	Nickelback	10	
64.	"Not in Love"	Enrique Iglesias	15	
65.	"Baby Boy"	Big Brovaz	8	
66.	"The Way You Move"	Outkast	7	
67.	"How Come"	D12	4	
68.	"Learn to Fly"	Shannon Noll	1	1
69.	"Out with My Baby"	Guy Sebastian	1	1
70.	"I Like That"	Houston feat. Chingy, Nate Dogg & I-20	12	
71.	"Holidae In"	Chingy	13	
72.	"Everytime"	Britney Spears	1	1
73.	"Am I Ever Gonna See the Biff Again?"	Reg Reagan	11	
74.	"I Miss You"	Blink-182	13	
75.	"Spider-Man Theme / Sway"	Michael Bublé	21	
76.	"Welcome to My Life"	Simple Plan	7	
77.	"Stand Up / Not Many"	Scribe	21	
78.	"Accidentally in Love"	Counting Crows	11	
79.	"Amazing"	George Michael	6	
80.	"Take Me to the Clouds Above"	LMC vs. U2	7	
81.	"It's My Life"	No Doubt	7	
82.	"The Prayer"	Anthony Callea	1	5
83.	"Popular"	Darren Hayes	3	
84.	"Bounce"	Sarah Connor	14	
85.	"I Believe"	Fantasia	4	
86.	"Tilt Ya Head Back"	Nelly feat. Christina Aguilera	5	
87.	"Confessions Part II"	Usher	5	
88.	"Ms. Vanity"	Rob Mills	6	
89.	"Look What You've Done"	Jet	14	
90.	"In the Shadows"	The Rasmus	23	
91.	"Breakaway"	Kelly Clarkson	10	
92.	"The Trouble with Love Is"	Kelly Clarkson	11	
93.	"My Prerogative"	Britney Spears	7	
94.	"She Wants to Move"	N.E.R.D.	21	
95.	"Me Against the Music"	Britney Spears feat. Madonna	1	2
96.	"It's Too Late"	Evermore	16	
97.	"Zebra"	John Butler Trio	22	
98.	"Don't Tell Me"	Avril Lavigne	10	
99.	"Take My Breath Away"	Jessica Simpson	15	
100.	"I Am"	Killing Heidi	16	
