= List of number-one albums of 2005 (Australia) =

ARIA Charts number-one albums of 2005 < 2004 2006 >

Other Australian number-one charts of 2005
- singles
- dance singles

Top Australian singles and albums of 2005
- Triple J Hottest 100
- top 25 singles
- top 25 albums

These are the Australian number-one albums of 2005, per the ARIA Charts.

Key
The yellow background indicates the #1 album on ARIA's End of Year Albums Chart of 2005.

Issue date	Album	Artist	Weeks at number one (total)
3 January	Greatest Hits	Robbie Williams	9 weeks
10 January	Greatest Hits	Robbie Williams	9 weeks
17 January	The Sound of White	Missy Higgins	7 weeks
24 January	The Sound of White	Missy Higgins	7 weeks
31 January	The Sound of White	Missy Higgins	7 weeks
7 February	The Sound of White	Missy Higgins	7 weeks
14 February	Love. Angel. Music. Baby.	Gwen Stefani	2 weeks
21 February	Love. Angel. Music. Baby.	Gwen Stefani	2 weeks
28 February	Hot Fuss	The Killers	1 week
7 March	In Between Dreams	Jack Johnson	4 weeks
14 March	In Between Dreams	Jack Johnson	4 weeks
21 March	In Between Dreams	Jack Johnson	4 weeks
28 March	In Between Dreams	Jack Johnson	4 weeks
4 April	Anthony Callea	Anthony Callea	3 weeks
11 April	Anthony Callea	Anthony Callea	3 weeks
18 April	Anthony Callea	Anthony Callea	3 weeks
25 April	Two Shoes	The Cat Empire	1 week
2 May	...Something to Be	Rob Thomas	1 week
9 May	Il Divo	Il Divo	2 weeks
16 May	Il Divo	Il Divo	2 weeks
23 May	The Sound of White	Missy Higgins	7 weeks
30 May	Mezmerize	System of a Down	1 week
6 June	Monkey Business	The Black Eyed Peas	3 weeks
13 June	X&Y	Coldplay	1 week
20 June	In Your Honor	Foo Fighters	5 weeks
27 June	In Your Honor	Foo Fighters	5 weeks
4 July	In Your Honor	Foo Fighters	5 weeks
11 July	In Your Honor	Foo Fighters	5 weeks
18 July	In Your Honor	Foo Fighters	5 weeks
25 July	Double Happiness	Jimmy Barnes	3 weeks
1 August	Double Happiness	Jimmy Barnes	3 weeks
8 August	Double Happiness	Jimmy Barnes	3 weeks
15 August	Monkey Business	The Black Eyed Peas	3 weeks
22 August	Monkey Business	The Black Eyed Peas	3 weeks
29 August	Back to Bedlam	James Blunt	12 weeks
5 September	Back to Bedlam	James Blunt	12 weeks
12 September	Back to Bedlam	James Blunt	12 weeks
19 September	Back to Bedlam	James Blunt	12 weeks
26 September	Have a Nice Day	Bon Jovi	1 week
3 October	See the Sun	Pete Murray	3 weeks
10 October	See the Sun	Pete Murray	3 weeks
17 October	See the Sun	Pete Murray	3 weeks
24 October	Lift	Shannon Noll	1 week
31 October	Intensive Care	Robbie Williams	1 week
7 November	Tea & Sympathy	Bernard Fanning	1 week
14 November	Ancora	Il Divo	3 weeks
21 November	Confessions on a Dance Floor	Madonna	1 week
28 November	Ancora	Il Divo	3 weeks
5 December	Ancora	Il Divo	3 weeks
12 December	Curtain Call: The Hits	Eminem	2 weeks
19 December	Reach Out: The Motown Record	Human Nature	3 weeks
26 December	Reach Out: The Motown Record	Human Nature	3 weeks

== See also ==
- 2005 in music
- List of number-one singles in Australia in 2005

== Notes ==
- Number of number one albums: 24
- Longest run at number one (during 2005): The Sound of White by Missy Higgins and In Your Honor by Foo Fighters (5 weeks)
