= List of top 25 albums for 2005 in Australia =

Top 25 albums of 2005 < 2004 2006 >

Other Australian top charts for 2005
- top 25 singles
- Triple J Hottest 100

Australian number-one charts of 2005
- albums
- singles
- dance singles

The following lists the top 25 albums of 2005 in Australia from the Australian Recording Industry Association (ARIA) End of Year Albums Chart.

#	Title	Artist	Highest pos. reached	Weeks at No. 1
1.	The Sound of White	Missy Higgins	1	7 (Note: The Sound of White debuted at #1 on the ARIA Top 50 in September 2004 for two weeks, it peaked at #1 in January–February 2005 for four weeks and again in May for one week. It continuously remained in the Top 50 until February 2006, re-entered in December and spent a total of 85 weeks in the charts.)
2.	Breakaway	Kelly Clarkson	2	(Note: Breakaway entered the ARIA Top 50 charts in January 2005, it peaked at #2 for a total of five weeks. It continuously remained in the Top 50 until January 2006 and spent a total of 73 weeks in the charts.)
3.	It's Time	Michael Bublé	2	(Note: It's Time entered the ARIA Top 50 charts in March 2005, it peaked at #2 for a total of four weeks. It continuously remained in the Top 50 until May 2006, it subsequently re-entered and spent a total of 66 weeks in the charts.)
4.	Love. Angel. Music. Baby.	Gwen Stefani	1	2
5.	Monkey Business	The Black Eyed Peas	1	3
6.	American Idiot	Green Day	1	2
7.	In Between Dreams	Jack Johnson	1	4
8.	X&Y	Coldplay	1	1
9.	Back to Bedlam	James Blunt	1	12 (Note: Back to Bedlam peaked at #1 on the ARIA Top 50 in October 2005 for four weeks, it returned to #1 in January–February 2006 for five weeks and again for three more weeks in April–May. It continuously remained in the Top 50 until November 2006 and subsequently re-entered to spend a total of 81 weeks in the charts.)
10.	In Your Honor	Foo Fighters	1	5
11.	Greatest Hits	Robbie Williams	1	9 (Note: Greatest Hits debuted at #1 on the ARIA Top 50 in September 2005 for three weeks; it returned to #1 in December for three weeks and continued at top spot for three more weeks in January 2005. It continuously remained in the Top 50 until June 2005 and subsequently re-entered to spend a total of 66 weeks in the charts.)
12.	Il Divo	Il Divo	1	2
13.	Songs About Jane	Maroon 5	1	1
14.	Demon Days	Gorillaz	2	
15.	...Something to Be	Rob Thomas	1	1
16.	Still Not Getting Any...	Simple Plan	6	
17.	Anthony Callea	Anthony Callea	1	3
18.	See the Sun	Pete Murray	1	3
19.	Hot Fuss	The Killers	1	1
20.	Ancora	Il Divo	1	3
21.	Awake Is the New Sleep	Ben Lee	5	
22.	Intensive Care	Robbie Williams	1	1
23.	Encore	Eminem	1	1
24.	Tea and Sympathy	Bernard Fanning	1	1 (Note: Tea & Sympathy debuted at #1 on the ARIA Top 50 in November 2005 for one week. It remained in the Top 50 for a total of 58 weeks.)
25.	Rearviewmirror	Pearl Jam	2	

Peak chart positions from 2005 are from the ARIA Charts, overall position on the End of Year Chart is calculated by ARIA based on the number of weeks and position that the records reach within the Top 100 albums for each week during 2005.
