= List of number-one dance singles of 2004 (Australia) =

ARIA Charts number-one dance singles of 2004 < 2003 2005 >

Other Australian number-one charts of 2004
- albums
- singles

Top Australian singles and albums of 2004
- Triple J Hottest 100
- top 25 singles
- top 25 albums

The ARIA Dance Chart is a chart that ranks the best-performing dance singles of Australia. It is published by Australian Recording Industry Association (ARIA), an organisation who collect music data for the weekly ARIA Charts. To be eligible to appear on the chart, the recording must be a single, and be "predominantly of a dance nature, or with a featured track of a dance nature, or included in the ARIA Club Chart or a comparable overseas chart".

== Chart history ==
| Issue date | Song | Artist(s) | Reference |
|---|---|---|---|
| 5 January | "Me Against the Music" | Britney Spears featuring Madonna | |
| 12 January | "Me Against the Music" | Britney Spears featuring Madonna | |
| 19 January | "Me Against the Music" | Britney Spears featuring Madonna | |
| 26 January | "Me Against the Music" | Britney Spears featuring Madonna | |
| 2 February | "Me Against the Music" | Britney Spears featuring Madonna | |
| 9 February | "Somebody To Love" | Boogie Pimps | |
| 16 February | "Somebody To Love" | Boogie Pimps | |
| 23 February | "Somebody To Love" | Boogie Pimps | |
| 1 March | "Somebody To Love" | Boogie Pimps | |
| 8 March | "Red Blooded Woman" | Kylie Minogue | |
| 15 March | "Amazing" | George Michael | |
| 22 March | "Amazing" | George Michael | |
| 29 March | "All Things (Just Keep Getting Better)" | Widelife with Simone Denny | |
| 5 April | "Take Me to the Clouds Above" | LMC vs. U2 | |
| 12 April | "Take Me to the Clouds Above" | LMC vs. U2 | |
| 19 April | "Take Me to the Clouds Above" | LMC vs. U2 | |
| 26 April | "Take Me to the Clouds Above" | LMC vs. U2 | |
| 3 May | "Take Me to the Clouds Above" | LMC vs. U2 | |
| 10 May | "Take Me to the Clouds Above" | LMC vs. U2 | |
| 17 May | "Bounce" | Sarah Connor | |
| 24 May | "Bounce" | Sarah Connor | |
| 31 May | "Bounce" | Sarah Connor | |
| 7 June | "Bounce" | Sarah Connor | |
| 14 June | "Push Up" | Freestylers | |
| 21 June | "Push Up" | Freestylers | |
| 28 June | "Push Up" | Freestylers | |
| 5 July | "Push Up" | Freestylers | |
| 12 July | "Push Up" | Freestylers | |
| 19 July | "Push Up" | Freestylers | |
| 26 July | "Push Up" | Freestylers | |
| 2 August | "Push Up" | Freestylers | |
| 9 August | "Push Up" | Freestylers | |
| 16 August | "Summer Rain" | Slinkee Minx | |
| 23 August | "Popular" | Darren Hayes | |
| 30 August | "Summer Rain" | Slinkee Minx | |
| 6 September | "Summer Rain" | Slinkee Minx | |
| 13 September | "Summer Rain" | Slinkee Minx | |
| 20 September | "Summer Rain" | Slinkee Minx | |
| 27 September | "Summer Rain" | Slinkee Minx | |
| 4 October | "Summer Rain" | Slinkee Minx | |
| 11 October | "Summer Rain" | Slinkee Minx | |
| 18 October | "Get A Life" | Freestylers | |
| 25 October | "Call on Me" | Eric Prydz | |
| 1 November | "Call on Me" | Eric Prydz | |
| 8 November | "Call on Me" | Eric Prydz | |
| 15 November | "What You Waiting For?" | Gwen Stefani | |
| 22 November | "What You Waiting For?" | Gwen Stefani | |
| 29 November | "What You Waiting For?" | Gwen Stefani | |
| 6 December | "What You Waiting For?" | Gwen Stefani | |
| 13 December | "What You Waiting For?" | Gwen Stefani | |
| 20 December | "What You Waiting For?" | Gwen Stefani | |
| 27 December | "What You Waiting For?" | Gwen Stefani | |

== Number-one artists ==
| Position | Artist | Weeks at No. 1 |
|---|---|---|
| 1 | Freestylers | 10 |
| 2 | Slinkee Minx | 8 |
| 3 | Gwen Stefani | 7 |
| 4 | LMC | 6 |
| 5 | Britney Spears | 5 |
| 5 | Madonna | 5 |
| 6 | Boogie Pimps | 4 |
| 6 | Sarah Connor | 4 |
| 7 | Eric Prydz | 3 |
| 8 | George Michael | 2 |
| 9 | Darren Hayes | 1 |
| 9 | Kylie Minogue | 1 |
| 9 | Widelife | 1 |
| 9 | Simone Denny | 1 |

== See also ==
- 2004 in music
- List of number-one singles of 2004 (Australia)
- List of number-one club tracks of 2004 (Australia)
