= List of number-one dance singles of 2003 (Australia) =

ARIA Charts number-one dance singles of 2003 < 2002 2004 >

Other Australian number-one charts of 2003
- albums
- singles

Top Australian singles and albums of 2003
- Triple J Hottest 100
- top 25 singles
- top 25 albums

The ARIA Dance Chart is a chart that ranks the best-performing dance singles of Australia. It is published by Australian Recording Industry Association (ARIA), an organisation who collect music data for the weekly ARIA Charts. To be eligible to appear on the chart, the recording must be a single, and be "predominantly of a dance nature, or with a featured track of a dance nature, or included in the ARIA Club Chart or a comparable overseas chart".

== Chart history ==
Issue date	Song	Artist(s)	Reference
6 January	"The Ketchup Song (Aserejé)"	Las Ketchup	
13 January	"The Ketchup Song (Aserejé)"	Las Ketchup	
20 January	"The Ketchup Song (Aserejé)"	Las Ketchup	
27 January	"The Ketchup Song (Aserejé)"	Las Ketchup	
3 February	"The Ketchup Song (Aserejé)"	Las Ketchup	
10 February	"The Ketchup Song (Aserejé)"	Las Ketchup	
17 February	"The Ketchup Song (Aserejé)"	Las Ketchup	
24 February	"Billie Jean"	The Soundbluntz	
3 March	"One of My Kind"	Rogue Traders	
10 March	"One of My Kind"	Rogue Traders	
17 March	"Tu es foutu (You Promised Me)"	In-Grid	
24 March	"Tu es foutu (You Promised Me)"	In-Grid	
31 March	"Tu es foutu (You Promised Me)"	In-Grid	
7 April	"Tu es foutu (You Promised Me)"	In-Grid	
14 April	"Tu es foutu (You Promised Me)"	In-Grid	
21 April	"American Life"	Madonna	
28 April	"Tu es foutu (You Promised Me)"	In-Grid	
5 May	"Tu es foutu (You Promised Me)"	In-Grid	
12 May	"Rock Your Body"	Justin Timberlake	
19 May	"Rock Your Body"	Justin Timberlake	
26 May	"Rock Your Body"	Justin Timberlake	
2 June	"I Begin to Wonder"	Dannii Minogue	
9 June	"I Begin to Wonder"	Dannii Minogue	
16 June	"I Begin to Wonder"	Dannii Minogue	
23 June	"Who Said (Stuck in the UK)"	Planet Funk	
30 June	"Who Said (Stuck in the UK)"	Planet Funk	
7 July	"Who Said (Stuck in the UK)"	Planet Funk	
14 July	"Who Said (Stuck in the UK)"	Planet Funk	
21 July	"Hollywood"	Madonna	
28 July	"Satisfaction"	Benny Benassi presents the Biz	
4 August	"Satisfaction"	Benny Benassi presents the Biz	
11 August	"Satisfaction"	Benny Benassi presents the Biz	
18 August	"Satisfaction"	Benny Benassi presents the Biz	
25 August	"Satisfaction"	Benny Benassi presents the Biz	
1 September	"Satisfaction"	Benny Benassi presents the Biz	
8 September	"Rubberneckin'" (Paul Oakenfold remix)	Elvis Presley	
15 September	"Rubberneckin'" (Paul Oakenfold remix)	Elvis Presley	
22 September	"Rubberneckin'" (Paul Oakenfold remix)	Elvis Presley	
29 September	"Rubberneckin'" (Paul Oakenfold remix)	Elvis Presley	
6 October	"Rubberneckin'" (Paul Oakenfold remix)	Elvis Presley	
13 October	"Rubberneckin'" (Paul Oakenfold remix)	Elvis Presley	
20 October	"Rubberneckin'" (Paul Oakenfold remix)	Elvis Presley	
27 October	"Rubberneckin'" (Paul Oakenfold remix)	Elvis Presley	
3 November	"Slave to the Music"	Nick Skitz	
10 November	"Slow"	Kylie Minogue	
17 November	"Me Against the Music"	Britney Spears featuring Madonna	
24 November	"Me Against the Music"	Britney Spears featuring Madonna	
1 December	"Me Against the Music"	Britney Spears featuring Madonna	
8 December	"Me Against the Music"	Britney Spears featuring Madonna	
15 December	"Me Against the Music"	Britney Spears featuring Madonna	
22 December	"Me Against the Music"	Britney Spears featuring Madonna	
29 December	"Me Against the Music"	Britney Spears featuring Madonna	

== Number-one artists ==
Position	Artist	Weeks at No. 1
1	Madonna	9
2	Elvis Presley	8
3	Britney Spears	7
3	In-Grid	7
3	Las Ketchup	7
4	Benny Benassi	6
5	Planet Funk	4
6	Dannii Minogue	3
6	Justin Timberlake	3
7	Rogue Traders	2
8	Kylie Minogue	1
8	Nick Skitz	1
8	The Soundbluntz	1

== See also ==
- 2003 in music
- List of number-one singles of 2003 (Australia)
- List of number-one club tracks of 2003 (Australia)
