= Beautiful Soul (song) =

2004 single by Jesse McCartney

Single by Jesse McCartney

from the album JMac and Beautiful Soul
- Released: September 14, 2004
- Length: 3:34 (album version); 3:57 (single version); 3:16 (radio edit)
- Label: Hollywood; Angel
- Songwriters: Adam Watts; Andy Dodd
- Producers: Adam Watts; Andy Dodd; Greg Wells

Jesse McCartney singles chronology
"Beautiful Soul" (2004)	"She's No You" (2005)

Music video
- "Beautiful Soul" on YouTube

"Beautiful Soul" is a song by American singer and actor Jesse McCartney. It was released as his debut single and the lead single from his debut album, Beautiful Soul (2004), on September 14, 2004, in the United States. The song reached number one in Australia, number two in New Zealand, and number 16 in the US. It also charted in several European countries in 2005 and 2006, reaching the top 20 in Austria, Ireland, Italy, the Netherlands, and the United Kingdom. "Beautiful Soul" is certified gold in New Zealand and the United States and platinum in Australia.

== Chart performance ==
"Beautiful Soul" debuted on the Billboard Hot 100 chart of December 11, 2004, at number 72, eventually peaking at number 16 on the chart and becoming McCartney's most successful single on the Hot 100 until "Leavin'" reached number 10 in 2008. The song has been certified triple platinum by the Recording Industry Association of America (RIAA) for equivalent sales and streams of 3,000,000 units in the United States. In Europe, the song peaked within the top 40 of several countries, including Austria, Ireland, Italy, the Netherlands, and the United Kingdom.

On February 27, 2005, the song first charted at number 14 on Australia's ARIA Singles Chart. It entered the top 10 the next week, then reached number three on April 3. The next week, it ascended to number one, dethroning Anthony Callea's "Rain" / "Bridge over Troubled Water". The single spent four weeks at number one, then fell 14 places to number 15 on May 8. The single spent only one more week on the chart before leaving the top 50, spending 12 weeks on the chart in total and appearing at number 19 on Australia's year-end chart. On New Zealand's RIANZ Singles Chart, the song debuted at number seven on March 14, 2005. It then spent the next 13 weeks rising and falling within the top 10, spending at single week at number two on the week dated May 2. It exited the top 10 on June 6, then made its final appearance in the top 40 at number 33 on July 11. Altogether, the song spent 18 weeks in the top 40 and ended the year as New Zealand's 13th-best-selling single.

== Music video ==
The music video for "Beautiful Soul" was directed by Marc Webb. The video is heavily influenced by the film Y Tu Mamá También directed by Alfonso Cuarón. The video features several scenes that are lifted from Cuarón's film.

== Track listings ==
Australian and New Zealand CD single

1. "Beautiful Soul"
2. "The Stupid Things" (acoustic version)

UK CD1 and European CD single

1. "Beautiful Soul" – 3:16
2. "Without U" – 3:11

UK CD2

1. "Beautiful Soul" (radio edit) – 3:15
2. "Get Your Shine On" – 3:11
3. "Beautiful Soul" (Drew Ferrante Mix) – 3:34
4. "Beautiful Soul" (video) – 3:17

== Charts ==
=== Weekly charts ===
Chart (2004–2007)	Peak position
Australia (ARIA)	1
Austria (Ö3 Austria Top 40)	8
Belgium (Ultratop 50 Flanders)	21
Belgium (Ultratip Bubbling Under Wallonia)	8
Canada CHR/Pop Top 30 (Radio & Records)	5
Canada Hot AC Top 30 (Radio & Records)	20
Germany (GfK)	25
Ireland (IRMA)	16
Italy (FIMI)	15
Netherlands (Dutch Top 40)	33
Netherlands (Single Top 100)	17
New Zealand (Recorded Music NZ)	2
Scottish Singles Sales (Official Charts)	8
Sweden (Sverigetopplistan)	37
Switzerland (Schweizer Hitparade)	22
UK Singles (Official Charts)	16
US Billboard Hot 100	16
US Adult Contemporary (Billboard)	23
US Adult Pop Airplay (Billboard)	13
US Pop Airplay (Billboard)	4

=== Year-end charts ===
Chart (2005)	Position
Australia (ARIA)	19
Belgium (Ultratop 50 Flanders)	85
New Zealand (RIANZ)	13
US Billboard Hot 100	75
US Adult Contemporary (Billboard)	46
US Adult Top 40 (Billboard)	28
US Mainstream Top 40 (Billboard)	19

== Certifications ==
Region	Certification	Certified units/sales
Australia (ARIA)	Platinum	70,000^{^}
New Zealand (RMNZ)	2× Platinum	60,000^{‡}
United Kingdom (BPI)	Silver	200,000^{‡}
United States (RIAA)	3× Platinum	3,000,000^{‡}
^{^} Shipments figures based on certification alone.^{‡} Sales+streaming figures based on certification alone.

== Release history ==
Release dates and formats for "Beautiful Soul"
Region	Date	Format	Label	Ref.
United States	September 14, 2004	Contemporary hit radio	Hollywood	
United States	January 18, 2005	Hot adult contemporary radio	Hollywood	
Australia	February 14, 2005	CD	Hollywood	
