= List of top 25 singles for 2003 in Australia =

Top 25 singles of 2003 < 2002 2004 >

Other Australian top charts for 2003
- top 25 albums
- Triple J Hottest 100

Australian number-one charts of 2003
- albums
- singles
- dance singles

The following lists the top 25 singles of 2003 in Australia from the Australian Recording Industry Association (ARIA) End of Year singles chart.

"Angels Brought Me Here" by Guy Sebastian was the biggest song of the year, peaking at #1 for three weeks and staying in the top 50 for 12 weeks. The longest stay at #1 was by Eminem with "Lose Yourself" which spent 8 weeks at the top spot in 2003, and 4 weeks in 2002.

#	Title	Artist	Highest pos. reached	Weeks at No. 1
1.	"Angels Brought Me Here"	Guy Sebastian	1	3
2.	"Lose Yourself"	Eminem	1	12 (Note: Debuted at #1 in 2002.)
3.	"Where Is the Love?"	The Black Eyed Peas	1	6
4.	"Born to Try"	Delta Goodrem	1	1 (Note: Peaked at #1 in 2002.)
5.	"In da Club"	50 Cent	1	5
6.	"Bring Me to Life"	Evanescence	1	6
7.	"Lost Without You"	Delta Goodrem	1	2
8.	"The Ketchup Song"	Las Ketchup	1	3 (Note: Debuted at #1 in 2002.)
9.	"Nu Flow"	Big Brovaz	3	—
10.	"Ignition (Remix)"	R. Kelly	1	6
11.	"All I Have"	Jennifer Lopez feat. LL Cool J	2	—
12.	"Stole"	Kelly Rowland	2	—
13.	"Angel"	Amanda Perez	2	—
14.	"All the Things She Said"	t.A.T.u.	1	2
15.	"Big Yellow Taxi"	Counting Crows feat. Vanessa Carlton	3	—
16.	"'03 Bonnie & Clyde"	Jay-Z and Beyoncé	2	—
17.	"Predictable"	Delta Goodrem	1	1
18.	"Innocent Eyes"	Delta Goodrem	1	2
19.	"Shut Up"	The Black Eyed Peas	1	3
20.	"Not Me, Not I"	Delta Goodrem	1	1
21.	"Shake Ya Tailfeather"	P. Diddy feat. Nelly and Murphy Lee	3	—
22.	"Hey Sexy Lady"	Shaggy	4	—
23.	"Someday"	Nickelback	4	—
24.	"Beautiful"	Christina Aguilera	1	1
25.	"Bump, Bump, Bump"	B2K feat. P. Diddy	4	—
26.	"Dilemma"	Nelly feat. Kelly Rowland	1	4
27.	"Stuck"	Stacie Orrico	3	—
28.	"Crazy in Love"	Beyoncé	2	—
29.	"Reign"	Ja Rule	5	—
30.	"Baby Boy"	Beyoncé feat. Sean Paul	3	—
31.	"I Know What You Want"	Busta Rhymes and Mariah Carey	3	—
32.	"Jenny from the Block"	Jennifer Lopez	5	—
33.	"P.I.M.P."	50 Cent	2	—
34.	"Lovesong"	Amiel	6	—
35.	"Mesmerize"	Ja Rule feat. Ashanti	5	—
36.	"Work It"	Missy Elliott	6	—
37.	"Beautiful"	Snoop Dogg	4	—
38.	"The Tide Is High (Get the Feeling)"	Atomic Kitten	4	—
39.	"You Promised Me (Tu es foutu)"	In-Grid	7	—
40.	"She Hates Me"	Puddle of Mudd	9	—
41.	"Do It with Madonna"	The Androids	4	—
42.	"Landslide"	Dixie Chicks	6	—
43.	"Intuition"	Jewel	4	—
44.	"21 Questions"	50 Cent	4	—
45.	"Get Busy"	Sean Paul	4	—
46.	"Rock Your Body"	Justin Timberlake	1	1
47.	"Thug Lovin'"	Ja Rule feat. Bobby Brown	7	—
48.	"Me Against the Music"	Britney Spears feat. Madonna	1	2
49.	"So Yesterday"	Hilary Duff	8	—
50.	"Into You"	Fabolous	4	—
51.	"Right Thurr"	Chingy	6	—
52.	"Breathe"	Blu Cantrell	8	—
53.	"Miss Independent"	Kelly Clarkson	3	—
54.	"Cry Me a River"	Justin Timberlake	2	—
55.	"Falling"	Candice Alley	5	—
56.	"Sing for the Moment"	Eminem	5	—
57.	"Family Portrait"	Pink	11	—
58.	"My Neck, My Back (Lick It)"	Khia	12	—
59.	"Slow"	Kylie Minogue	1	1
60.	"Naughty Girl"	Holly Valance	3	—
61.	"Hey Ya!"	Outkast	1	2
62.	"Hey Hey What You Say / Hello World"	The Saddle Club	20	—
63.	"Rise Up"	Australian Idol Final 12	1	3
64.	"Feel"	Robbie Williams	10	—
65.	"Unwell"	Matchbox Twenty	12	—
66.	"Business"	Eminem	4	—
67.	"(There's Gotta Be) More to Life"	Stacie Orrico	11	—
68.	"Scandalous"	Mis-Teeq	9	—
69.	"Boys of Summer"	DJ Sammy	9	—
70.	"Life Goes On"	LeAnn Rimes	7	—
71.	"The Anthem"	Good Charlotte	14	—
72.	"Unchained Melody"	Gareth Gates	9	—
73.	"If You're Not the One"	Daniel Bedingfield	14	—
74.	"Fighter"	Christina Aguilera	5	—
75.	"Rubberneckin' (Paul Oakenfold Remix)"	Elvis Presley	3	—
76.	"True Colours"	Kasey Chambers	4	—
77.	"Don't Know Why"	Norah Jones	5	—
78.	"White Flag"	Dido	1	1
79.	"United States of Whatever"	Liam Lynch	6	—
80.	"Señorita"	Justin Timberlake	6	—
81.	"Satisfaction"	Benny Benassi presents The Biz	10	—
82.	"What's Your Flava?"	Craig David	10	—
83.	"We've Got Tonight"	Ronan Keating & Lulu	12	—
84.	"When I Get You Alone"	Thicke	17	—
85.	"Round Round"	Sugababes	13	—
86.	"Sk8er Boi"	Avril Lavigne	3	—
87.	"Numb"	Linkin Park	10	—
88.	"Cleanin' Out My Closet"	Eminem	3	—
89.	"Rise & Fall"	Craig David	6	—
90.	"Your Body Is a Wonderland"	John Mayer	23	—
91.	"Somewhere I Belong"	Linkin Park	13	—
92.	"Can I Go Now"	Jennifer Love Hewitt	12	—
93.	"Trouble"	Pink	8	—
94.	"Why Not"	Hilary Duff	14	—
95.	"Can't Hold Us Down"	Christina Aguilera	5	—
96.	"Are You Gonna Be My Girl"	Jet	20	—
97.	"I Begin to Wonder"	Dannii Minogue	14	—
98.	"Feel Good Time"	Pink feat. William Orbit	7	—
99.	"Beware of the Boys (Mundian To Bach Ke)"	Panjabi MC feat. Jay-Z	12	—
100.	"Fever for the Flava"	Hot Action Cop	13	—
