= List of top 25 albums for 2004 in Australia =

Top 25 albums of 2004 < 2003 2005 >

Other Australian top charts for 2004
- top 25 singles
- Triple J Hottest 100

Australian number-one charts of 2004
- albums
- singles
- dance singles

The following lists the top 25 albums of 2004 in Australia from the Australian Recording Industry Association (ARIA) End of Year Albums Chart.

#	Title	Artist	Highest pos. reached	Weeks at No. 1
1.	Get Born	Jet	1	2 (Note: Get Born debuted at #3 on the ARIA Top 50 charts in September 2003. It peaked at #1 in May 2004 for two weeks and has spent a total of 84 weeks in the charts.)
2.	That's What I'm Talking About	Shannon Noll	1	4
3.	Feeler	Pete Murray	1	4
4.	Greatest Hits	Robbie Williams	1	9 (Note: Greatest Hits debuted at #1 on the ARIA Top 50 in October 2004 for three weeks, it returned to #1 in December for three weeks and continued at top spot for three more weeks in January 2005. It remained continuously in the Top 50 until June 2005 and subsequently re-entered to spend a total of 66 weeks in the charts.)
5.	Sunrise Over Sea	John Butler Trio	1	3
6.	Songs About Jane	Maroon 5	1	1
7.	Fallen	Evanescence	1	2 (Note: Fallen debuted at #4 on the ARIA Top 50 in May 2003, it peaked at #1 in February 2004 for three weeks. It remained in the Top 50 until November and spent a total of 75 weeks in the charts.)
8.	Michael Bublé	Michael Bublé	1	2
9.	Elephunk	The Black Eyed Peas	1	1
10.	Feels Like Home	Norah Jones	2	
11.	Confessions	Usher	2	
12.	Life for Rent	Dido	1	2
13.	Mistaken Identity	Delta Goodrem	1	1
14.	Anastacia	Anastacia	1	3
15.	The Sound of White	Missy Higgins	1	7 (Note: The Sound of White debuted at #1 on the ARIA Top 50 in September 2004 for two weeks, it peaked at #1 in January–February 2005 for four weeks and again in May for one week. It remained in the Top 50 until February 2006, re-entered in December and spent a total of 85 weeks in the charts.)
16.	Innocent Eyes	Delta Goodrem	1	29 (Note: Innocent Eyes debuted at #1 on the ARIA Top 50 charts in April 2003. It spent 27 weeks at the top in 2003 and two more weeks in 2004 for a record total, by any Australian act, of 29 weeks at #1. It spent a total of 64 weeks in the Top 50 charts, last exiting in November 2004.)
17.	Greatest Hits	Red Hot Chili Peppers	2	
18.	Encore	Eminem	1	1
19.	Just As I Am	Guy Sebastian	1	4 (Note: Just As I Am debuted at #1 on the ARIA Top 50 in December 2003 for two weeks and continued at top spot for two more weeks in January 2004. It remained in the Top 50 until April 2004 and spent a total of 17 weeks in the charts.)
20.	Wayward Angel	Kasey Chambers	1	5
21.	Greatest Hits	Guns N' Roses	6	
22.	The Long Road	Nickelback	4	
23.	How to Dismantle an Atomic Bomb	U2	1	1
24.	On and On	Jack Johnson	2	
25.	American Idiot	Green Day	1	2

Peak chart positions from 2004 are from the ARIA Charts, overall position on the End of Year Chart is calculated by ARIA based on the number of weeks and position that the records reach within the Top 100 albums for each week during 2004.
