= List of number-one albums of 2003 (Australia) =

ARIA Charts number-one albums of 2003 < 2002 2004 >

Other Australian number-one charts of 2003
- singles
- dance singles

Top Australian singles and albums of 2003
- Triple J Hottest 100
- top 25 singles
- top 25 albums

These are the Australian number-one albums of 2003, per the ARIA Charts.

Key
The yellow background indicates the #1 album on ARIA's End of Year Albums Chart of 2003.

| Issue date | Album | Artist | Weeks at number one (total) |
|---|---|---|---|
| 6 January | Let Go | Avril Lavigne | 7 weeks |
| 13 January | Let Go | Avril Lavigne | 7 weeks |
| 20 January | Let Go | Avril Lavigne | 7 weeks |
| 27 January | 8 Mile | Soundtrack | 2 weeks |
| 3 February | 8 Mile | Soundtrack | 2 weeks |
| 10 February | Come Away with Me | Norah Jones | 9 weeks |
| 17 February | Come Away with Me | Norah Jones | 9 weeks |
| 24 February | Come Away with Me | Norah Jones | 9 weeks |
| 3 March | Come Away with Me | Norah Jones | 9 weeks |
| 10 March | Come Away with Me | Norah Jones | 9 weeks |
| 17 March | Come Away with Me | Norah Jones | 9 weeks |
| 24 March | Come Away with Me | Norah Jones | 9 weeks |
| 31 March | Innocent Eyes | Delta Goodrem | 29 weeks |
| 7 April | Innocent Eyes | Delta Goodrem | 29 weeks |
| 14 April | Innocent Eyes | Delta Goodrem | 29 weeks |
| 21 April | Innocent Eyes | Delta Goodrem | 29 weeks |
| 28 April | Innocent Eyes | Delta Goodrem | 29 weeks |
| 5 May | Innocent Eyes | Delta Goodrem | 29 weeks |
| 12 May | Come Away with Me | Norah Jones | 9 weeks |
| 19 May | Come Away with Me | Norah Jones | 9 weeks |
| 26 May | Innocent Eyes | Delta Goodrem | 29 weeks |
| 2 June | Innocent Eyes | Delta Goodrem | 29 weeks |
| 9 June | Innocent Eyes | Delta Goodrem | 29 weeks |
| 16 June | St. Anger | Metallica | 2 weeks |
| 23 June | St. Anger | Metallica | 2 weeks |
| 30 June | Innocent Eyes | Delta Goodrem | 29 weeks |
| 7 July | Innocent Eyes | Delta Goodrem | 29 weeks |
| 14 July | Vulture Street | Powderfinger | 3 weeks |
| 21 July | Vulture Street | Powderfinger | 3 weeks |
| 28 July | Vulture Street | Powderfinger | 3 weeks |
| 4 August | Innocent Eyes | Delta Goodrem | 29 weeks |
| 11 August | Innocent Eyes | Delta Goodrem | 29 weeks |
| 18 August | Innocent Eyes | Delta Goodrem | 29 weeks |
| 25 August | The Official Fiction | Something for Kate | 1 week |
| 1 September | Innocent Eyes | Delta Goodrem | 29 weeks |
| 8 September | Innocent Eyes | Delta Goodrem | 29 weeks |
| 15 September | Innocent Eyes | Delta Goodrem | 29 weeks |
| 22 September | Innocent Eyes | Delta Goodrem | 29 weeks |
| 29 September | Innocent Eyes | Delta Goodrem | 29 weeks |
| 6 October | Life for Rent | Dido | 2 weeks |
| 13 October | Life for Rent | Dido | 2 weeks |
| 20 October | Innocent Eyes | Delta Goodrem | 29 weeks |
| 27 October | Innocent Eyes | Delta Goodrem | 29 weeks |
| 3 November | Innocent Eyes | Delta Goodrem | 29 weeks |
| 10 November | Innocent Eyes | Delta Goodrem | 29 weeks |
| 17 November | Innocent Eyes | Delta Goodrem | 29 weeks |
| 24 November | Innocent Eyes | Delta Goodrem | 29 weeks |
| 1 December | Innocent Eyes | Delta Goodrem | 29 weeks |
| 8 December | Innocent Eyes | Delta Goodrem | 29 weeks |
| 15 December | Just As I Am | Guy Sebastian | 4 weeks |
| 22 December | Just As I Am | Guy Sebastian | 4 weeks |
| 29 December | Just As I Am | Guy Sebastian | 4 weeks |

== See also ==
- 2003 in music
- List of number-one singles in Australia in 2003

== Notes ==
- Number of number one albums: 9
- Longest run at number one (during 2003): Innocent Eyes by Delta Goodrem (27 weeks plus two weeks in 2004; longest run at #1 on the ARIA Albums Chart in the 2000s)
