= List of top 25 albums for 2003 in Australia =

Top 25 albums of 2003 < 2002 2004 >

Other Australian top charts for 2003
- top 25 singles
- Triple J Hottest 100

Australian number-one charts of 2003
- albums
- singles
- dance singles

The following lists the top 25 albums of 2003 in Australia from the Australian Recording Industry Association (ARIA) End of Year Albums Chart.

#	Title	Artist	Highest pos. reached	Weeks at No. 1
1.	Innocent Eyes	Delta Goodrem	1	29 (Note: Innocent Eyes debuted at #1 on the ARIA Top 50 charts in April 2003. It spent 27 weeks at the top in 2003 and two more weeks in 2004 for a record total, by any Australian act, of 29 weeks at #1. It spent a total of 64 weeks in the Top 50 charts, last exiting in November 2004.)
2.	Come Away with Me	Norah Jones	1	9
3.	Let Go	Avril Lavigne	1	7 (Note: Let Go debuted at #3 on the ARIA Top 50 in September 2002 and peaked at #1 in mid-December for three weeks. It continued at #1 for four more weeks to late January 2003. It remained in the Top 50 until September 2003 and spent a total of 52 weeks in the charts.)
4.	Vulture Street	Powderfinger	1	3
5.	Just As I Am	Guy Sebastian	1	4 (Note: Just As I Am debuted at #1 on the ARIA Top 50 in December 2002 for two weeks and continued at top spot for two more weeks in January 2004. It remained in the Top 50 until April 2004 and spent a total of 17 weeks in the charts.)
6.	The Eminem Show	Eminem	1	6
7.	8 Mile: Music from and Inspired by the Motion Picture	Soundtrack	1	2
8.	More Than You Think You Are	Matchbox Twenty	3	
9.	Escapology	Robbie Williams	3	
10.	A Rush of Blood to the Head	Coldplay	1	1 (Note: A Rush of Blood to the Head debut at #1 on the ARIA Top 50 charts in September 2002 for one week. It exited the Top 50 in November and returned in March 2003, reaching #2 in August and remaining continuously until June 2004. It returned again in 2005 and 2006 and has spent a total of 84 weeks in the charts.)
11.	Life for Rent	Dido	1	2
12.	Stripped	Christina Aguilera	7	
13.	One Voice: Greatest Hits	John Farnham	2	
14.	Meteora	Linkin Park	2	
15.	Fallen	Evanescence	1	3
16.	The Last Time	John Farnham	1	1
17.	Diamonds On the Inside	Ben Harper	2	
18.	It Had to Be You: The Great American Songbook	Rod Stewart	5	
19.	On and On	Jack Johnson	2	
20.	Justified	Justin Timberlake	9	
21.	By the Way	Red Hot Chili Peppers	1	4
22.	Get Rich or Die Tryin'	50 Cent	4	
23.	Home	Dixie Chicks	4	
24.	The Best of 1990–2000	U2	1	1
25.	Greatest Hits	Red Hot Chili Peppers	2	

Peak chart positions from 2003 are from the ARIA Charts, overall position on the End of Year Chart is calculated by ARIA based on the number of weeks and position that the records reach within the Top 100 albums for each week during 2003.
