= List of number-one singles of 2004 (Australia) =

ARIA Charts number-one singles of 2004 < 2003 2005 >

Other Australian number-one charts of 2004
- albums
- dance singles

Top Australian singles and albums of 2004
- Triple J Hottest 100
- top 25 singles
- top 25 albums

These are the number-one songs of 2004 in the Australian ARIA singles chart.

== Chart history ==
Key
The yellow background indicates the #1 song on ARIA's End of Year Singles Chart of 2004.

Week beginning	Song	Artist
4 January	"Shut Up"	The Black Eyed Peas
11 January	"Shut Up"	The Black Eyed Peas
18 January	"Hey Ya!"	OutKast
25 January	"Hey Ya!"	OutKast
1 February	"What About Me"	Shannon Noll
8 February	"What About Me"	Shannon Noll
15 February	"What About Me"	Shannon Noll
22 February	"What About Me"	Shannon Noll
29 February	"All I Need Is You"	Guy Sebastian
7 March	"Superstar"	Jamelia
14 March	"Toxic"	Britney Spears
21 March	"Toxic"	Britney Spears
28 March	"Yeah!"	Usher featuring Lil Jon and Ludacris
4 April	"Fuck It (I Don't Want You Back)"	Eamon
11 April	"Fuck It (I Don't Want You Back)"	Eamon
18 April	"Fuck It (I Don't Want You Back)"	Eamon
25 April	"Fuck It (I Don't Want You Back)"	Eamon
2 May	"My Band"	D12
9 May	"Left Outside Alone"	Anastacia
16 May	"My Band"	D12
23 May	"Black Betty"	Spiderbait
30 May	"Black Betty"	Spiderbait
6 June	"Black Betty"	Spiderbait
13 June	"F.U.R.B. (Fuck You Right Back)"	Frankee
20 June	"F.U.R.B. (Fuck You Right Back)"	Frankee
27 June	"Everytime"	Britney Spears
4 July	"F.U.R.B. (Fuck You Right Back)"	Frankee
11 July	"Learn to Fly"	Shannon Noll
18 July	"Angel Eyes"	Paulini
25 July	"Angel Eyes"	Paulini
1 August	"Angel Eyes"	Paulini
8 August	"Scar"	Missy Higgins
15 August	"When the War Is Over"/ "One Night Without You"	Cosima
22 August	"When the War Is Over"/ "One Night Without You"	Cosima
29 August	"My Place"/"Flap Your Wings"	Nelly featuring Jaheim
5 September	"She Will Be Loved"	Maroon 5
12 September	"She Will Be Loved"	Maroon 5
19 September	"She Will Be Loved"	Maroon 5
26 September	"She Will Be Loved"	Maroon 5
3 October	"Out with My Baby"	Guy Sebastian
10 October	"She Will Be Loved"	Maroon 5
17 October	"Out of the Blue"	Delta Goodrem
24 October	"Out of the Blue"	Delta Goodrem
31 October	"Out of the Blue"	Delta Goodrem
7 November	"Just Lose It"	Eminem
14 November	"What You Waiting For?"	Gwen Stefani
21 November	"What You Waiting For?"	Gwen Stefani
28 November	"These Kids"	Joel Turner and the Modern Day Poets
5 December	"Listen with Your Heart"	Casey Donovan
12 December	"Listen with Your Heart"	Casey Donovan
19 December	"The Prayer"	Anthony Callea
26 December	"The Prayer"	Anthony Callea

- Songs that peaked at number 2 include "Milkshake" by Kelis, "Here Without You" by 3 Doors Down, "I Don't Wanna Know" by Mario Winans and "Leave (Get Out)" by JoJo
- Songs that peaked at number 3 include "Suga Suga" by Baby Bash
- Other hit songs included "My Immortal" by Evanescence (4), "Behind Blue Eyes" (4), "With You" by Jessica Simpson (4), "Four to the Floor" by Starsailor (5) and "So Beautiful" by Pete Murray (9).
