= List of number-one singles of 2003 (Australia) =

ARIA Charts number-one singles of 2003 < 2002 2004 >

Other Australian number-one charts of 2003
- albums
- dance singles

Top Australian singles and albums of 2003
- Triple J Hottest 100
- top 25 singles
- top 25 albums

The Australian Top 100 Singles Chart is a chart that ranks the best-performing singles in Australia. Published by the ARIA report, the data is compiled by the Australian Recording Industry Association (ARIA) based collectively on each single's weekly physical sales. digital sales and airplay.

== Chart history ==
Key
The yellow background indicates the #1 song on ARIA's Years End Singles Chart of 2003.

Songs reaching No. 1, with artists, listed by chart week
Week beginning	Song	Artist
5 January	"Lose Yourself"	Eminem
12 January	"Lose Yourself"	Eminem
19 January	"Lose Yourself"	Eminem
26 January	"Lose Yourself"	Eminem
2 February	"Lose Yourself"	Eminem
9 February	"Lose Yourself"	Eminem
16 February	"Lose Yourself"	Eminem
23 February	"Lose Yourself"	Eminem
2 March	"Beautiful"	Christina Aguilera
9 March	"Lost Without You"	Delta Goodrem
16 March	"All the Things She Said"	t.A.T.u.
23 March	"Lost Without You"	Delta Goodrem
30 March	"All the Things She Said"	t.A.T.u.
6 April	"In da Club"	50 Cent
13 April	"In da Club"	50 Cent
20 April	"In da Club"	50 Cent
27 April	"In da Club"	50 Cent
4 May	"In da Club"	50 Cent
11 May	"Rock Your Body"	Justin Timberlake
18 May	"Bring Me to Life"	Evanescence featuring Paul McCoy
25 May	"Bring Me to Life"	Evanescence featuring Paul McCoy
1 June	"Bring Me to Life"	Evanescence featuring Paul McCoy
8 June	"Bring Me to Life"	Evanescence featuring Paul McCoy
15 June	"Bring Me to Life"	Evanescence featuring Paul McCoy
22 June	"Bring Me to Life"	Evanescence featuring Paul McCoy
29 June	"Innocent Eyes"	Delta Goodrem
6 July	"Innocent Eyes"	Delta Goodrem
13 July	"Ignition" (Remix)	R. Kelly
20 July	"Ignition" (Remix)	R. Kelly
27 July	"Ignition" (Remix)	R. Kelly
3 August	"Ignition" (Remix)	R. Kelly
10 August	"Ignition" (Remix)	R. Kelly
17 August	"Ignition" (Remix)	R. Kelly
24 August	"Where Is the Love?"	The Black Eyed Peas featuring Justin Timberlake
31 August	"Where Is the Love?"	The Black Eyed Peas featuring Justin Timberlake
7 September	"Where Is the Love?"	The Black Eyed Peas featuring Justin Timberlake
14 September	"Where Is the Love?"	The Black Eyed Peas featuring Justin Timberlake
21 September	"White Flag"	Dido
28 September	"Not Me, Not I"	Delta Goodrem
5 October	"Where Is the Love?"	The Black Eyed Peas featuring Justin Timberlake
12 October	"Where Is the Love?"	The Black Eyed Peas featuring Justin Timberlake
19 October	"Rise Up"	Australian Idol Final 12
26 October	"Rise Up"	Australian Idol Final 12
2 November	"Rise Up"	Australian Idol Final 12
9 November	"Slow"	Kylie Minogue
16 November	"Me Against the Music"	Britney Spears featuring Madonna
23 November	"Me Against the Music"	Britney Spears featuring Madonna
30 November	"Angels Brought Me Here"	Guy Sebastian
7 December	"Angels Brought Me Here"	Guy Sebastian
14 December	"Angels Brought Me Here"	Guy Sebastian
21 December	"Predictable"	Delta Goodrem
28 December	"Shut Up"	The Black Eyed Peas

== Notes ==
- Songs that peaked at number 2 include "All I Have" by Jennifer Lopez feat. LL Cool J, "Stole" by Kelly Rowland, "Angel" by Amanda Perez, "'03 Bonnie & Clyde" by Jay-Z and Beyoncé, "Cry Me A River" by Justin Timberlake and "P.I.M.P" by 50 Cent.
- Songs that peaked at number 3 include "Nu Flow" by Big Brovaz, "Big Yellow Taxi" by Counting Crows feat. Vanessa Carlton, "Shake Ya Tailfeather" by and P. Diddy feat. Nelly and Murphy Lee .
- Other hit songs included "Hey Sexy Lady" by Shaggy, "Someday" by Nickelback and "Bump, Bump, Bump" by B2K feat. P. Diddy all of which peaked at number 4 and were all in the top 25.
- Number of number-one singles: 19
- Longest run at number-one: "Lose Yourself" by Eminem (8 weeks + 4 weeks in 2002)
- Artist with the most number ones: 4, Delta Goodrem
