= List of number-one albums of 2004 (Australia) =

ARIA Charts number-one albums of 2004 < 2003 2005 >

Other Australian number-one charts of 2004
- singles
- dance singles

Top Australian singles and albums of 2004
- Triple J Hottest 100
- top 25 singles
- top 25 albums

These are the Australian number-one albums of 2004, per the ARIA Charts.

Key
The yellow background indicates the #1 album on ARIA's End of Year Albums Chart of 2004.

Issue date	Album	Artist	Weeks at number one (total)
5 January	Just As I Am	Guy Sebastian	4 weeks
12 January	Innocent Eyes	Delta Goodrem	29 weeks
19 January	Innocent Eyes	Delta Goodrem	29 weeks
26 January	Fallen	Evanescence	3 weeks
2 February	Fallen	Evanescence	3 weeks
9 February	Fallen	Evanescence	3 weeks
16 February	That's What I'm Talking About	Shannon Noll	4 weeks
23 February	That's What I'm Talking About	Shannon Noll	4 weeks
1 March	That's What I'm Talking About	Shannon Noll	4 weeks
8 March	That's What I'm Talking About	Shannon Noll	4 weeks
15 March	Sunrise Over Sea	The John Butler Trio	3 weeks
22 March	Sunrise Over Sea	The John Butler Trio	3 weeks
29 March	Feeler	Pete Murray	4 weeks
5 April	Feeler	Pete Murray	4 weeks
12 April	Feeler	Pete Murray	4 weeks
19 April	Feeler	Pete Murray	4 weeks
26 April	Anastacia	Anastacia	2 weeks
3 May	D12 World	D12	1 Week
10 May	Michael Bublé	Michael Bublé	2 weeks
17 May	Get Born	Jet	2 weeks
24 May	Get Born	Jet	2 weeks
31 May	Under My Skin	Avril Lavigne	1 week
7 June	Wayward Angel	Kasey Chambers	5 weeks
14 June	Wayward Angel	Kasey Chambers	5 weeks
21 June	Wayward Angel	Kasey Chambers	5 weeks
28 June	Wayward Angel	Kasey Chambers	5 weeks
5 July	Wayward Angel	Kasey Chambers	5 weeks
12 July	For All You've Done	Hillsong Church	1 week
19 July	Sunrise Over Sea	The John Butler Trio	3 weeks
26 July	Shrek 2	Soundtrack	1 week
2 August	One Determined Heart	Paulini	2 weeks
9 August	One Determined Heart	Paulini	2 weeks
16 August	Anastacia	Anastacia	2 weeks
23 August	Elephunk	The Black Eyed Peas	1 week
30 August	Classified	bond	1 week
6 September	Michael Bublé	Michael Bublé	2 weeks
13 September	The Sound of White	Missy Higgins	7 weeks
20 September	The Sound of White	Missy Higgins	7 weeks
27 September	American Idiot	Green Day	2 weeks
4 October	American Idiot	Green Day	2 weeks
11 October	The Chronicles of Life and Death	Good Charlotte	1 week
18 October	Songs About Jane	Maroon 5	1 week
25 October	Greatest Hits	Robbie Williams	9 weeks
1 November	Greatest Hits	Robbie Williams	9 weeks
8 November	Greatest Hits	Robbie Williams	9 weeks
15 November	Mistaken Identity	Delta Goodrem	1 week
22 November	Encore	Eminem	1 week
29 November	How to Dismantle an Atomic Bomb	U2	1 week
6 December	Greatest Hits	Robbie Williams	9 weeks
13 December	Greatest Hits	Robbie Williams	9 weeks
20 December	Greatest Hits	Robbie Williams	9 weeks
27 December	Greatest Hits	Robbie Williams	9 weeks

== See also ==
- 2004 in music
- List of number-one singles in Australia in 2004
