= List of top 100 singles for 2005 in Australia =

The following lists the top 25 singles of 2005 in Australia from the Australian Recording Industry Association (ARIA) end of year singles chart.

The Prayer by Anthony Callea was the biggest song of the year, peaking at #1 for five weeks (including one week in 2004), and staying in the top 50 for 17 weeks. The longest stay at #1 was by The Pussycat Dolls with Don't Cha which spent seven weeks at the top spot.

#	Title	Artist	Highest pos. reached	Weeks at No. 1
1.	"The Prayer"	Anthony Callea	1	5
2.	"Don't Cha"	The Pussycat Dolls feat. Busta Rhymes	1	7
3.	"Lonely"	Akon	1	3
4.	"Axel F"	Crazy Frog	1	3
5.	"Over and Over"	Nelly feat. Tim McGraw	1	5
6.	"Switch"	Will Smith	1	1
7.	"Let Me Love You"	Mario	3	
8.	"Nasty Girl"	Nitty	1	2
9.	"Feel Good Inc."	Gorillaz	3	
10.	"Don't Phunk with My Heart"	The Black Eyed Peas	1	3
11.	"You're Beautiful"	James Blunt	2	
12.	"Ghetto Gospel"	2Pac feat. Elton John	1	1
13.	"1, 2 Step"	Ciara feat. Missy Elliott	2	
14.	"Almost Here"	Brian McFadden and Delta Goodrem	1	1
15.	"4ever"	The Veronicas	2	
16.	"These Boots Are Made for Walkin'"	Jessica Simpson	2	
17.	"We Belong Together"	Mariah Carey	1	2
18.	"Bad Day"	Daniel Powter	3	
19.	"Beautiful Soul"	Jesse McCartney	1	4
20.	"Voodoo Child"	Rogue Traders	4	
21.	"Hollaback Girl"	Gwen Stefani	1	1
22.	"Since U Been Gone"	Kelly Clarkson	3	
23.	"Lonely No More"	Rob Thomas	3	
24.	"Candy Shop"	50 Cent	3	
25.	"Incomplete"	Backstreet Boys	1	1
26.	"Rich Girl"	Gwen Stefani	2	
27.	"Das Kleine Krokodil"	Schnappi	6	
28.	"The Special Two"	Missy Higgins	2	
29.	"Get Right"	Jennifer Lopez	3	
30.	"Numb/Encore"	Linkin Park and Jay-Z	3	
31.	"Boulevard of Broken Dreams"	Green Day	5	
32.	"Obsession (No Es Amor)"	Frankie J	5	
33.	"Gold Digger"	Kanye West	1	3
34.	"Rain / Bridge over Troubled Water"	Anthony Callea	1	2
35.	"Shine"	Shannon Noll	1	1
36.	"Drop It Like It's Hot"	Snoop Dogg	4	
37.	"Signs"	Snoop Dogg	1	2
38.	"Stop the Music"	P-Money and Scribe	7	
39.	"Pon de Replay"	Rihanna	6	
40.	"What You Waiting For?"	Gwen Stefani	1	2
41.	"Lose Control"	Missy Elliott	7	
42.	"Wonderful"	Ja Rule feat. Ashanti	6	
43.	"C'mon Aussie C'mon"	Shannon Noll	2	
44.	"My Humps"	The Black Eyed Peas	1	2
45.	"Photograph"	Nickelback	3	
46.	"Untitled (How Could This Happen to Me?)"	Simple Plan	9	
47.	"Evie"	The Wrights	2	
48.	"Don't Lie"	The Black Eyed Peas	6	
49.	"Hung Up"	Madonna	1	1
50.	"Soldier"	Destiny's Child	3	
51.	"Maybe Tonight"	Kate DeAraugo	1	2
52.	"I Just Wanna Live"	Good Charlotte	12	
53.	"Girl"	Destiny's Child	5	
54.	"La La"	Ashlee Simpson	10	
55.	"I Like the Way"	BodyRockers	12	
56.	"Underwear Goes Inside the Pants"	Lazyboy	5	
57.	"Welcome to My Life"	Simple Plan	7	
58.	"Lose My Breath"	Destiny's Child	3	
59.	"These Kids"	Joel Turner and the Modern Day Poets	1	1
60.	"It's Like That"	Mariah Carey	9	
61.	"Oh"	Ciara feat. Ludacris	7	
62.	"Shut Up!"	Simple Plan	14	
63.	"Like Toy Soldiers"	Eminem	4	
64.	"Dare"	Gorillaz	11	
65.	"Rumors"	Lindsay Lohan	10	
66.	"Tilt Ya Head Back"	Nelly feat. Christina Aguilera	5	
67.	"Do Somethin'"	Britney Spears	8	
68.	"Have a Nice Day"	Bon Jovi	8	
69.	"Ass Like That"	Eminem	10	
70.	"Just a Lil Bit"	50 Cent	13	
71.	"Push the Button"	Sugababes	3	
72.	"Listen with Your Heart"	Casey Donovan	1	2
73.	"Mockingbird"	Eminem	9	
74.	"Ten Days"	Missy Higgins	12	
75.	"Hell No!"	Ricki-Lee	5	
76.	"Way to Go!"	Rogue Traders	7	
77.	"1 Thing"	Amerie	13	
78.	"Pony"	Kasey Chambers	10	
79.	"Popcorn"	Crazy Frog	11	
80.	"Sunshine"	Ricki-Lee	8	
81.	"Better Days"	Pete Murray	13	
82.	"Flashdance"	Deep Dish	14	
83.	"Midas Touch"	Midnight Star	11	
84.	"Shake It Off"	Mariah Carey	6	
85.	"Pointless Relationship"	Tammin	5	
86.	"Hey Bitty"	Nitty	11	
87.	"Wake Me Up When September Ends"	Green Day	13	
88.	"Ooh Ahh"	Tamara Jaber	13	
89.	"So Good"	Bratz Rock Angelz	14	
90.	"Just Lose It"	Eminem	1	1
91.	"Tripping"	Robbie Williams	7	
92.	"Caught Up"	Usher	15	
93.	"Catch My Disease"	Ben Lee	27	
94.	"Put Your Hands Up"	Random	7	
95.	"Hate It or Love It"	The Game	21	
96.	"This Is How a Heart Breaks"	Rob Thomas	13	
97.	"She's No You"	Jesse McCartney	10	
98.	"Whatever Will Be"	Tammin	13	
99.	"'N' Dey Say"	Nelly	20	
100.	"Wake Up"	Hilary Duff	15	
