= Stacie Orrico discography =

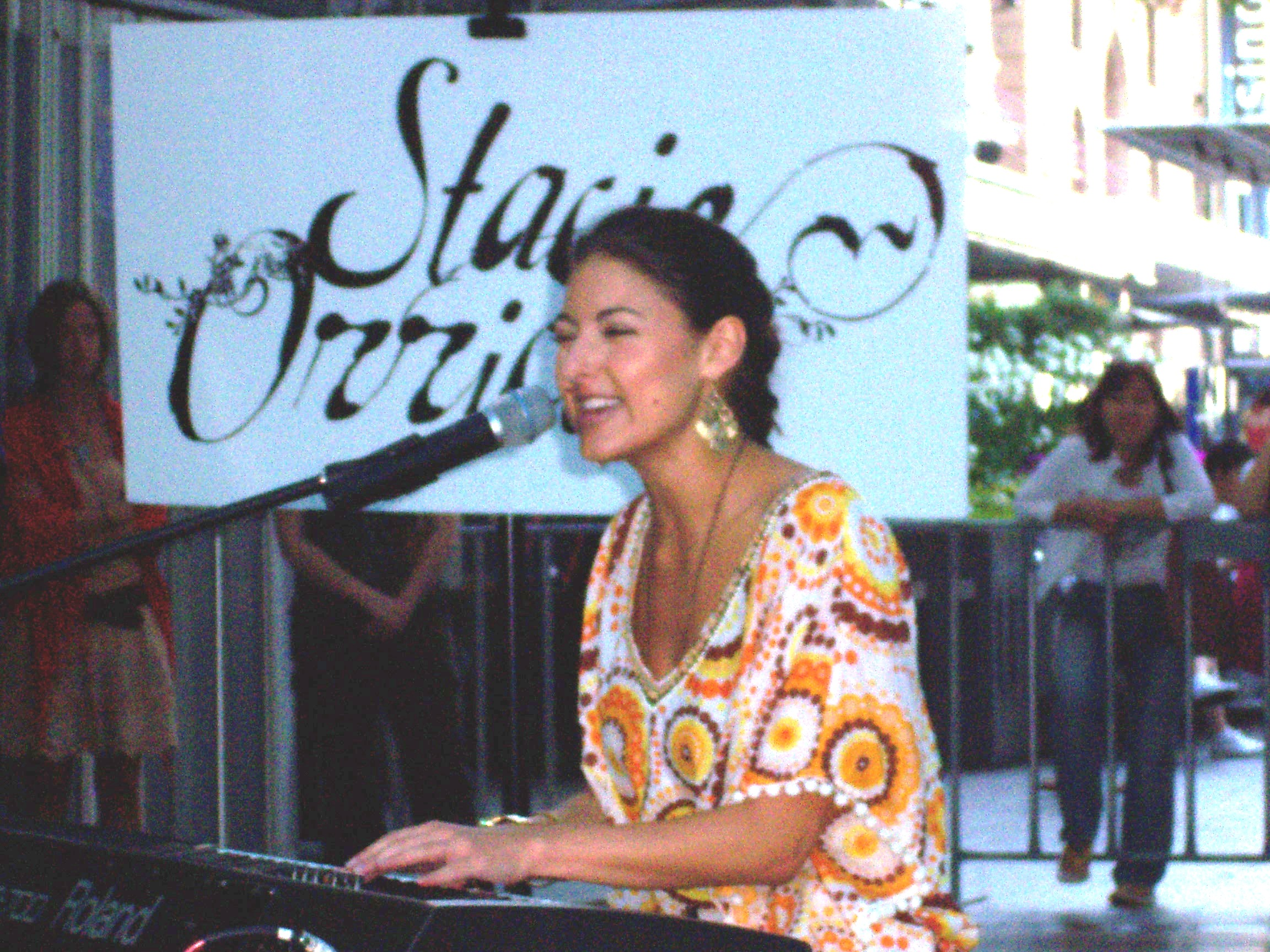
- Studio albums: 3
- Extended plays: 3
- Live albums: 1
- Compilation albums: 1
- Singles: 9
- Video albums: 2
- Music videos: 9

The discography of American pop/CCM singer Stacie Orrico consists of three studio albums, one live album, one compilation album, four extended plays and nine commercial singles.

Orrico made her recording debut under ForeFront Records in 1998, when she was just 12 years old. In 2000, she released her first album under the label, entitled Genuine, and it sold 13,000 copies in its first week. It also managed to peak inside the Billboard 200. "Don't Look at Me" was the first single released to radio and it managed to top Christian charts for ten consecutive weeks. The title track and "Everything" were later released as commercial singles, but both failed to chart on the Billboard Hot 100.

In 2003, she released her self-titled second album, Stacie Orrico, after signing a contract with Virgin Records. The album sold over 500,000 copies in the US, peaking at number fifty-nine on the Billboard 200 and certifying Gold by the Recording Industry Association of America. The first single, "Stuck", charted at number fifty-two on the Hot 100, and even peaked at higher positions in other countries. The album's second single, "(There's Gotta Be) More to Life", reached number thirty on the Hot 100, becoming her biggest hit in the US. "I Promise" and "I Could Be the One" were later released as the following singles, and both failed to chart in the US. Worldwide sales of Stacie Orrico stands over 3.5 million copies.

She dropped from ForeFront Records in 2005, after being managed by the label for seven years. She still pursued her music career and began writing for her third studio album, Beautiful Awakening. The album was internationally released in August 2006, together with its first single, "I'm Not Missing You". The song charted at number nineteen on the Bubbling Under Hot 100 Singles chart.

== Albums ==
=== Studio albums ===
List of studio albums, with selected chart positions and certifications
Title	Album details	Peak chart positions										Certifications (sales thresholds)
Title	Album details	US	AUS	AUT	GER	JPN	NL	NZ	NOR	SWI	UK	Certifications (sales thresholds)
Genuine	Released: August 29, 2000; Label: ForeFront; Formats: CD, cassette	103	—	—	—	68	—	—	—	—	—	
Stacie Orrico	Released: March 25, 2003; Label: ForeFront/Virgin; Formats: CD, digital download	59	43	15	13	3	27	16	7	11	37	RIAA: Gold; BPI: Gold; IFPI NOR: Gold; RIAJ: 3× Platinum
Beautiful Awakening	Released: August 14, 2006; Label: Virgin; Formats: CD, digital download	—	—	61	51	8	—	—	—	39	64	RIAJ: Gold
"—" denotes releases that did not chart or were not released in that country.

=== Live albums ===
List of live albums, with selected chart positions
Title	Album details	Chart position
Title	Album details	JPN
Live in Japan	Released: November 2, 2004; Label: ForeFront/Virgin; Formats: CD, digital download	55

=== Compilation albums ===
List of compilation albums, with selected chart positions
Title	Album details	Chart position
Title	Album details	JPN
More to Life: The Best of Stacie Orrico	Released: November 28, 2007; Label: Virgin; Formats: CD, digital download	57

== Extended plays ==
List of extended plays, with selected chart positions and certifications
Title	EP details	Chart positions	
Title	EP details	US Heat	JPN
Christmas Wish	Released: October 9, 2001; Label: ForeFront; Formats: CD, digital download	30	86
For Christmas	Released: December 2003; Label: ForeFront/Virgin; Formats: CD (Target exclusive)	—	—
Reawakened	Released: August 24, 2014; Label: Independent; Formats: Digital download	—	—

== Singles ==
List of singles, with selected chart positions and certifications, showing year released and album name
Title	Year	Peak chart positions									Certifications	Album
Title	Year	US	AUS	GER	IRE	NL	NZ	SWE	SWI	UK	Certifications	Album
"Genuine"	2000	—	—	—	—	—	—	—	—	—		Genuine
"Everything"	2001	—	—	—	—	—	—	—	—	—		Genuine
"Stuck"	2003	52	3	4	6	4	3	9	6	9	ARIA: Platinum; BVMI: Gold; RMNZ: Gold	Stacie Orrico
"(There's Gotta Be) More to Life"	2003	30	11	12	9	19	3	45	22	12	ARIA: Gold; IFPI NOR: Platinum; RMNZ: Gold	Stacie Orrico
"I Promise"	2004	—	48	66	19	47	—	—	—	22		Stacie Orrico
"I Could Be the One"	2004	—	—	—	26	—	—	—	—	34		Stacie Orrico
"Instead" (Note: Song was released only in Japan and to US Christian radio.)	2004	—	—	—	—	—	—	—	—	—		Stacie Orrico
"I'm Not Missing You"	2006	— (Note: Charted at number 19 on the US Bubbling Under Hot 100 Singles chart.)	26	32	38	30	18	—	25	22		Beautiful Awakening
"So Simple"	2006	—	—	—	—	—	—	—	—	—		Beautiful Awakening
"Catch Me If You Can" (Note: Released exclusively through CD Baby.) (featuring The Gabe Cummins Orchestra)	2012	—	—	—	—	—	—	—	—	—		Non-album singles
"Blessed" (with Rachel Lampa)	2025	—	—	—	—	—	—	—	—	—		Non-album singles
"—" denotes releases that did not chart or were not released in that country.

== Other appearances ==
=== As vocalist ===
Title	Year	Album
"Do for You" (Jarvis Church featuring Stacie Orrico)	2008	The Long Way Home
"Ready or Not" (Fugees cover) (The Fray featuring Stacie Orrico)	2012	Scars & Stories

=== As songwriter ===
Title	Year	Artist(s)	Album
"I Can't Be Without You"	2010	Fantasia	Back to Me demo

=== Leaked demos ===
- 2008: "Knock 'Em Out" (featuring Sleepy Brown)
- 2013: "Catch Me If You Can" (featuring The Gabe Cummins Orchestra)

== Videography ==
=== DVDs ===
Title	Information	Notes
There's Gotta Be More to Life	Video compilation; Released: November 18, 2003	Features "Stuck" and "(There's Gotta Be) More to Life" music videos, exclusive remixes, and behind the scenes footage.
Stacie Orrico: Live in Japan	Live concert; Released: November 2, 2004	Contains live performance in Tokyo, Japan; Bonus music videos

=== Music videos ===
Title	Year	Director(s)
"Genuine"	2000	Eric Welch
"Everything"	2001	Eric Welch
"Stuck"	2003	Diane Martel
"(There's Gotta Be) More to Life"	2003	Dave Meyers
"I Promise"	2004	Antti J.
"I Could Be the One"	2004	Diane Martel
"I'm Not Missing You"	2006	Diane Martel
"I'm Not Missing You" (US version)	2006	Diane Martel
"So Simple"	2006	Ray Kay
