= New Zealand top 50 singles of 2003 =

This is a list of the top 50 singles in 2003 in New Zealand.

== Chart ==
Key
† – Song of New Zealand origin (Note: Whether or not a song is of New Zealand origin is determined by the RIANZ)

List of top 50 singles in 2003
Rank	Artist	Single
1	Scribe	"Stand Up/Not Many"† from the album, The Crusader
2	The Black Eyed Peas	"Where Is the Love?" from the album, Elephunk
3	Christina Aguilera	"Beautiful" from the album, Stripped
4	50 Cent	"In da Club" from the album, Get Rich or Die Tryin'
5	Delta Goodrem	"Born To Try" from the album, Innocent Eyes
6	Jack Johnson	"Flake" from the album, Brushfire Fairytales
7	Daniel Bedingfield	"If You're Not the One" from the album, Gotta Get Thru This
8	Matchbox Twenty	"Unwell" from the album, More Than You Think You Are
9	Snoop Dogg featuring Pharrell Williams & Charlie Wilson	"Beautiful" from the album, Paid tha Cost to Be da Boss
10	Brooke Fraser	"Better"† from the album, What To Do With Daylight
11	Counting Crows featuring Vanessa Carlton	"Big Yellow Taxi" from the album, Hard Candy
12	Stacie Orrico	"Stuck" from the album, Stacie Orrico
13	Goldenhorse	"Maybe Tomorrow"† from the album, Riverhead
14	Blindspott	"Phlex"† from the album, Blindspott
15	Amanda Perez	"Angel" from the album, Angel
16	Avril Lavigne	"I'm with You" from the album, Let Go
17	LeAnn Rimes	"Life Goes On" from the album, Twisted Angel
18	R. Kelly	"Ignition (Remix)" from the album, Chocolate Factory
19	Justin Timberlake	"Rock Your Body" from the album, Justified
20	t.A.T.u.	"All the Things She Said" from the album, 200 km/h in the Wrong Lane
21	Delta Goodrem	"Lost Without You" from the album, Innocent Eyes
22	Evanescence	"Bring Me to Life" from the album, Fallen
23	Big Brovaz	"Nu Flow" from the album, Nu-Flow
24	Beyoncé featuring Jay-Z	"Crazy in Love" from the album, Dangerously In Love
25	Blue featuring Elton John	"Sorry Seems To Be The Hardest Word" from the album, One Love
26	Chingy	"Right Thurr" from the album, Jackpot
27	Dido	"White Flag" from the album, Life For Rent
28	Robin Thicke	"When I Get You Alone" from the album, A Beautiful World
29	Christina Aguilera featuring Lil Kim	"Can't Hold Us Down" from the album, Stripped
30	Eminem	"Lose Yourself" from the 8 Mile soundtrack
31	Busta Rhymes featuring Mariah Carey & Flipmode Squad	"I Know What You Want" from the album, It Ain't Safe No More...
32	Stacie Orrico	"(There's Gotta Be) More To Life" from the album, Stacie Orrico
33	Nesian Mystik	"For The People"† from the album, Polysaturated
34	Nelly featuring Murphy Lee & P Diddy	"Shake Ya Tailfeather" from the bad boys II soundtrack)
35	Robbie Williams	"Something Beautiful" from the album, Escapology
36	Bic Runga	"Listening for the Weather"† from the album, Beautiful Collision
37	Jennifer Lopez and LL Cool J	"All I Have" from the album, This Is Me... Then
38	Clay Aiken	"Bridge Over Troubled Water" from the single, Bridge Over Troubled Water/This Is the Night
39	Justin Timberlake	"Señorita" from the album, Justified
40	Ja Rule featuring Ashanti	"Mesmerize" from the album, The Last Temptation
41	Mareko	"Mareko (Here To Stay)"† from the album, White Sunday
42	Coldplay	"Clocks" from the album, A Rush of Blood to the Head
43	Kelly Rowland	"Stole" from the album, Simply Deep
44	Elemeno P	"Verona"† from the album, Love & Disrespect
45	Live	"Heaven" from the album, Birds of Pray
46	Bone Thugs-n-Harmony featuring Phil Collins	"Home" from the album, Thug World Order
47	3 The Hard Way	"It's On (Move to This)"† from the album, Eyes On The Prize
48	Carly Binding	"We Kissed"† from the album, Passenger
49	Nickelback	"Someday" from the album, The Long Road
50	Mis-Teeq	"Scandalous" from the album, Eye Candy

== Chart by numbers ==
=== Origin ===
==== By artist ====
The following shows the country of origin from where the artist (including any featured artist where applicable) originate from. Artists who appear more than once have only been tallied once.

Country	Total
United States	38
New Zealand	12
England	10
Canada	2
Australia	1
Russia	1

Notes
- Daniel Bedingfield was born in New Zealand and raised in England and as such both countries have been included in his tally.
- Kitchener Powell appears as a featured vocalist on "Phlex" and is most times not credited but is included as a separate artist origin.
- Justin Timberlake sang the chorus of "Where Is the Love? uncredited and has been included in the United States tally.

==== By single ====
The following shows the country of origin from which the singles originate regardless of who the artist is.

Country	Total
United States	37
England	7
New Zealand	6
Australia	1
Netherlands	1

Notes
- The single "Stand Up/Not Many" was released on Dirty Records (NZ) and Festival Mushroom Records (Australia) but is tallied from both New Zealand and Australia.
- The single "Someday" by Nickelback was released on Roadrunner Records from the Netherlands. As Nickelback is from the United States both have been tallied.

=== Most singles ===
Shows the artists with the most singles to appear in this chart. Includes where they appear as a featured artist, however where a singer appears as a guest singer, this does not count towards their groups tally.

Artist	Total
Christina Aguilera	2
Delta Goodrem	2
Justin Timberlake	3
Stacie Orrico	2

Notes
- Justin Timberlake receives three credits as aside from his two songs, he also sang uncredited in the Black Eyed Peas's song, Where Is the Love?

=== Format ===
The following shows where each single appears on, whether it was the artists album, a non-album single, an extended play or as part of a soundtrack.

Format	Total
Albums	47
Soundtracks	2
non-album singles	1

Notes
- The song "Lose Yourself" appears on the soundtrack 8 Mile: Music from and Inspired by the Motion Picture.
- The song "Shake Ya Tailfeather" appears on the soundtrack Bad Boys II: The Soundtrack and the album Murphy's Law.
- The song "Bring Me to Life" appears on the album Fallen and the soundtrack Daredevil: The Album.
- The song "Big Yellow Taxi" (Counting Crows version) appears on the album Hard Candy and the soundtrack Two Weeks Notice.
- The song "Bridge Over Troubled Water/This Is the Night" by Clay Aiken was released as a double A-side non-album single, later included as a bonus track on Measure of a Man.

=== Multiple releases ===
The following shows singles that had multiple releases from the same album.

Title	Total	Singles
Innocent Eyes (Delta Goodrem)	2	Born to Try; Lost Without You
Stripped (Christina Aguilera)	2	Beautiful; Can't Hold Us Down
Stacie Orrico (Stacie Orrico)	2	Stuck (There's Gotta Be) More to Life
Justified (Justin Timberlake)	2	Rock Your Body; Señorita

=== Type ===
The following shows the denomination that each single was released as, whether as a solo artist or as part of a group, band or duo. Also shows how many singles had guest artists.

Type	Total
Solo artists	32
Groups	18
Featured Artists	15
Collaborations	2

Notes
- Busta Rhymes (with Flipmode Squad) have been regarded as a group in this instance.
- Jennifer Lopez and LL Cool J on "All I Have" and Snoop Dogg featuring Pharrell Williams & Charlie Wilson are classed as collaborations.

=== Top Genre ===
The following shows the most common genres the Top 50 singles are regarded as (as per their genre descriptions in the singles entries. Where a genre was not noted, the genre of the album was used instead. Sub-genres have been split as their own entry).

Genre	Total	Singles
Pop	18	Beautiful (Christina Aguilera); Born to Try (Delta Goodrem); If You're Not the One (Daniel Bedingfield); Better (Brooke Fraser); Maybe Tomorrow (Goldenhorse); Stuck (Stacie Orrico) (There's Gotta Be) More to Life (Stacie Orrico); Life Goes On (LeAnn Rimes); I'm with You (Avril Lavigne); White Flag (Dido); We Kissed (Carly Binding); Verona (Elemeno P); Señorita (Justin Timberlake); Lost Without You (Delta Goodrem); Listening for the Weather (Bic Runga); Bridge Over Troubled Water (Clay Aiken); Rock Your Body (Justin Timberlake); Crazy in Love (Beyoncé featuring Jay-Z)
R&B	17	Beautiful (Christina Aguilera); Beautiful (Snoop Dogg featuring Pharrell Williams & Charlie Wilson); Angel (Amanda Perez); Ignition (Remix) (R. Kelly); Rock Your Body (Justin Timberlake); When I Get You Alone (Robin Thicke); Can't Hold Us Down (Christina Aguilera featuring Lil' Kim); I Know What You Want (Busta Rhymes & Mariah Carey featuring Flipmode Squad); All I Have (Jennifer Lopez & LL Cool J); Mesmerize (Ja Rule featuring Ashanti); Stole (Kelly Rowland); Nu Flow (Big Brovaz); Crazy in Love (Beyoncé featuring Jay-Z); Something Beautiful (Robbie Williams); Señorita (Justin Timberlake); Sorry Seems to Be the Hardest Word (Blue featuring Elton John); Scandalous (Mis-Teeq)
Hip hop	14	Stand Up/Not Many (Scribe); In da Club (50 Cent); Beautiful (Snoop Dogg feat. Pharrell Williams and Charlie Wilson); Can't Hold Us Down (Christina Aguilera featuring Lil' Kim); I Know What You Want (Busta Rhymes); Mesmerize (Ja Rule); Right Thurr (Chingy); Lose Yourself (Eminem); Where Is the Love? (The Black Eyed Peas feat. Justin Timberlake); Mareko (Here to Stay) (Mareko); For the People (Nesian Mystik); It's On (Move to This) (3 The Hard Way); Home (Bone Thugs-n-Harmony featuring Phil Collins); Scandalous (Mis-Teeq)
Rock	8	Flake (Jack Johnson); Unwell (Matchbox Twenty); Bring Me to Life (Evanescence); Clocks (Coldplay); Heaven (Live); Someday (Nickelback); Verona (Elemeno P); Listening for the Weather (Bic Runga)
Alternative rock	5	Unwell (Matchbox Twenty); Bring Me to Life (Evanescence); Clocks (Coldplay); Someday (Nickelback); Stole (Kelly Rowland)
Soul	4	Rock Your Body (Justin Timberlake); Something Beautiful (Robbie Williams); If You're Not the One (Daniel Bedingfield); When I Get You Alone (Robin Thicke)
Pop rock	4	Big Yellow Taxi (Counting Crows featuring Vanessa Carlton); I'm with You (Avril Lavigne); Stole (Kelly Rowland); Lost Without You (Delta Goodrem)
Nu metal	2	Bring Me to Life (Evanescence); Phlex (Blindspott)

=== Top Labels ===
The following shows the most common record labels that a single was associated with. Any label that only had one single has not been noted.

Label	Total	Singles
Interscope Records	6	Where Is the Love? (The Black Eyed Peas feat. Justin Timberlake); In da Club (50 Cent); When I Get You Alone (Robin Thicke); All the Things She Said (t.A.T.u.); Lose Yourself (Eminem); Beautiful (Snoop Dogg feat. Pharrell Williams and Charlie Wilson)
Jive Records	5	Ignition (Remix) (R. Kelly); Rock Your Body (Justin Timberlake); Señorita (Justin Timberlake); I Know What You Want (Busta Rhymes & Mariah Carey); Mesmerize (Ja Rule)
Columbia Records	5	Better (Brooke Fraser); Listening for the Weather (Bic Runga); Crazy in Love (Beyoncé); Stole (Kelly Rowland); Verona (Elemeno P)
RCA Records	4	Beautiful (Christina Aguilera); Can't Hold Us Down (Christina Aguilera featuring Lil' Kim); Bridge Over Troubled Water (Clay Aiken); Phlex (Blindspott feat. Kitchener Powell)
Epic Records	4	Born to Try (Delta Goodrem); Nu Flow (Big Brovaz); All I Have (Jennifer Lopez & LL Cool J); Lost Without You (Delta Goodrem)
Virgin Records	3	Stuck (Stacie Orrico); Angel (Amanda Perez); Sorry Seems to Be the Hardest Word (Blue featuring Elton John)
Atlantic Records	2	Unwell (Matchbox Twenty); White Flag (Dido)

=== Top songwriters ===
The following shows the songwriters who had the most top-selling singles of 2003 in New Zealand.

Writer	Total	Singles
Pharrell Williams	4	Beautiful (Snoop Dogg featuring Pharrell Williams & Charlie Wilson); Rock Your Body (Justin Timberlake); Señorita (Justin Timberlake); Where Is the Love? (The Black Eyed Peas feat. Justin Timberlake)
Chad Hugo	3	Beautiful (Snoop Dogg); Rock Your Body (Justin Timberlake); Señorita (Justin Timberlake)
Justin Timberlake	3	Rock Your Body (Justin Timberlake); Señorita (Justin Timberlake); Where Is the Love? (The Black Eyed Peas feat. Justin Timberlake)
Mikkel Eriksen	2	Sorry Seems to Be the Hardest Word (Blue featuring Elton John); Scandalous (Mis-Teeq)
Tor Hermansen	2	Sorry Seems to Be the Hardest Word (Blue featuring Elton John); Scandalous (Mis-Teeq)
Stacie Orrico	2	Stuck (Stacie Orrico) (There's Gotta Be) More to Life (Stacie Orrico)
Kevin Kadish	2	Stuck (Stacie Orrico) (There's Gotta Be) More to Life (Stacie Orrico)

=== Most/Least songwriters ===
The following shows the singles that were credited as having been written by only one person and the singles that had the most credited writers of 2003.

Single	Total	Songwriter/s
"Beautiful" (Christina Aguilera)	1	Linda Perry
"Angel" (Amanda Perez)	1	Amanda Perez
"If You're Not the One" (Daniel Bedingfield)	1	Daniel Bedingfield
"Unwell" (Matchbox Twenty)	1	Rob Thomas
"Better" (Brooke Fraser)	1	Brooke Fraser
"Ignition (Remix)" (R. Kelly)	1	Robert Kelly
"Flake" (Jack Johnson)	1	Jack Johnson
"We Kissed" (Carly Binding)	1	Carly Binding
"Listening for the Weather" (Bic Runga)	1	Bic Runga
"Nu Flow" (Big Brovaz)	9	Michael Mugiisha; John Paul Horsley; Tayo Aisida; Cherise Roberts; Nadia Shepherd; Dion Howell; Dean Macintosh; Abdul Bella; Michael Brown

=== Top producers ===
The following shows the producers who had the most singles to appear on this chart.

Producer	Total	Singles
Pharrell Williams	3	Beautiful (Snoop Dogg); Rock Your Body (Justin Timberlake); Señorita (Justin Timberlake)
Chad Hugo	3	Beautiful (Snoop Dogg); Rock Your Body (Justin Timberlake); Señorita (Justin Timberlake)
Mikkel Eriksen	2	Sorry Seems to Be the Hardest Word (Blue featuring Elton John); Scandalous (Mis-Teeq)
Tor Hermansen	2	Sorry Seems to Be the Hardest Word (Blue featuring Elton John); Scandalous (Mis-Teeq)
Matt Serletic	2	Unwell (Matchbox Twenty); Stuck (Stacie Orrico)
