= List of awards and nominations received by Stacie Orrico =

Stacie Orrico awards and nominations
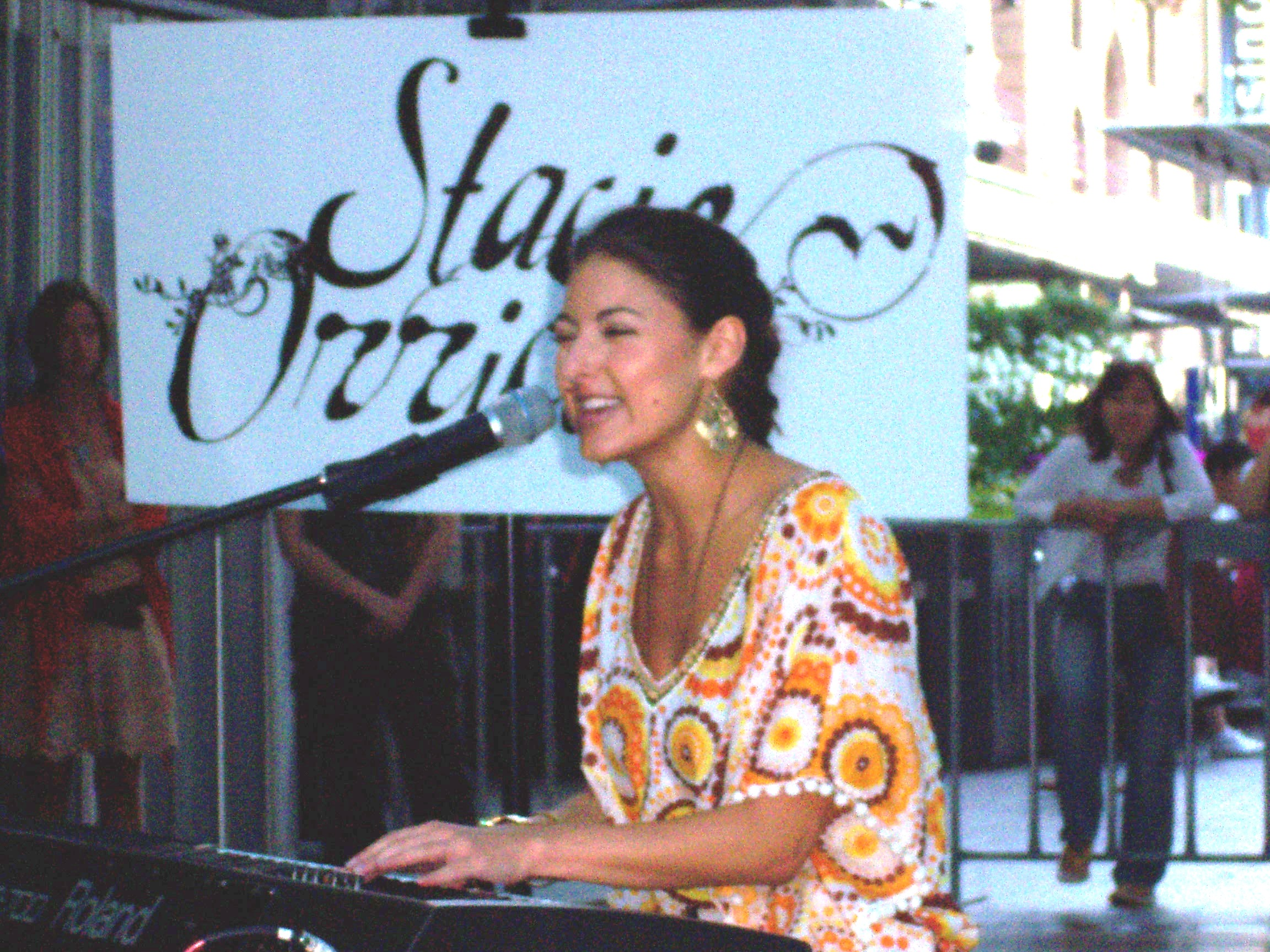
Awards and nominations
Award	Wins	Nominations
Grammy	0	1

Totals (Note: Certain award groups do not simply award one winner. They acknowledge several different recipients, have runners-up, and have third place. Since this is a specific recognition and is different from losing an award, runner-up mentions are considered wins in this award tally. For simplification and to avoid errors, each award in this list has been presumed to have had a prior nomination.)
- Wins: 9
- Nominations: 24

Stacie Orrico is an American pop singer and lyricist.

== American Society of Composers, Authors and Publishers, United States (ASCAP) ==
Year	Result	Award	Category
2000	WON	Christian Music Award	Most Performed Songs; For: "Don't Look at Me"
2001	WON	Christian Music Award	Most Performed Songs; For: "With A Little Faith"; Given to the songwriter, David Wyatt

== American Christian Music Awards ==
Year	Result	Category
2004	Nominated	Outstanding Pop Album
2004	WON	Female Artist of the Year

== Billboard Music Award, United States ==
Year	Result	Category
2000	Nominated	Best Music Video Clip; For: "Genuine"
2001	Nominated	Best Music Video Clip; For: "Genuine"

== BMI Songwriter Award, World ==
Year	Result	Award	Category
2004	WON	Christian Music Award	"(There's Gotta Be) More to Life"; Given to the songwriters, Sabelle Breer, Kevin Kadish
2005	WON	Pop Award	"(There's Gotta Be) More to Life"; Given to the songwriter, Lucy Woodward

== Gospel Music Association, World ==
Year	Result	Award	Category
2001	Nominated	Dove Award	New Artist of the Year
2001	Nominated	Dove Award	Pop/Contemporary Recorded Song - Songwriter; For: "Don't Look at Me"
2001	Nominated	Dove Award	Pop/Contemporary Recorded Song - Performance; For: "Don't Look at Me"
2001	Nominated	Dove Award	Song of the Year; For: "Don't Look at Me"
2004	Nominated	Dove Award	Artist of the Year
2004	WON	Dove Award	Female Vocalist of the Year
2004	WON	Dove Award	Pop/Contemporary Album of the Year; For: Stacie Orrico
2004	WON	Dove Award	Short Form Music Video of the Year; For: "(There's Gotta Be) More to Life"
2006	Nominated	Dove Award	Long Form Video of the Year; For: Stacie Orrico: Live in Japan

== Grammy Awards, World ==
Year	Result	Category
2004	Nominated	Best Contemporary/Pop Gospel Album; For: Stacie Orrico

== Juice TV Awards, NZ ==
Year	Result	Category
2004	Nominated	Best Solo Video; For: "Stuck"

== MTV Video Music Awards Japan ==
Year	Result	Category
2004	Nominated	Best New Artist

== Music Television, World ==
Year	Result	Award	Category
2003	Nominated	Video Music Awards	Best New Artist in a Video; For: "Stuck"
2004	Nominated	Asia Awards	Best Breakthrough Artist
2004	Nominated	Japan Video Music Awards	Best New Artist Video; For: "Stuck"

== Victory Awards ==
Year	Result	Category
2004	WON	Best Album (Female Artist); For: "Stacie Orrico

She also won 'Artist of the Year' award from Rock Across Australia (TRAA), a weekly Christian music chart.
