= More to Life: The Best of Stacie Orrico =

Greatest hits album by Stacie Orrico
- Released: November 28, 2007
- Length: 56:29
- Label: EMI Music
- Producer: Mark Heimermann; Dallas Austin; Tedd T; Eddie DeGarmo; Dave Deviller; Greg Ham; Sean Hosien; Harvey Mason Jr.; Mooki; Stacie Orrico; Matt Rolling; Matt Serletic; Dwayne Bastiany; KayGee; The Underdogs; Terence "Tramp Baby" Abney Novel; She'kspere; Lashaunda "Babygirl" Carr; Trendsettas; Track & Field; Dent

Stacie Orrico chronology
Beautiful Awakening (2006)	More to Life: The Best of Stacie Orrico (2007)	Reawakened (2014)

More to Life: The Best of Stacie Orrico (also known as simply Best of Stacie Orrico) is a greatest hits album by American singer Stacie Orrico. It was released by EMI Music exclusively in Japan, on November 28, 2007. There is a deluxe edition that contains a DVD featuring all of Orrico's music videos, with the exception of "Genuine."

== Critical reception ==
Professional ratings
Review scores
Source	Rating
AllMusic	4/5 stars

AllMusic editor Jon O'Brien remarked that More to Life: The Best of Stacie Orrico "cherrypicks the best 14 tracks from her three studio LPs, revealing that her blend of soulful R&B, melodic pop/rock, and spiritual lyrics deserved to achieve much bigger success than her measly two Billboard Hot 100 entries suggest." He found that "this greatest hits shows that mainstream Christian music doesn't have to begin and end with hard rock."

== Track listing ==
More to Life: The Best of Stacie Orrico edition
No.	Title	Writer(s)	Producer(s)	Length
1.	"(There's Gotta Be) More to Life"	Stacie Orrico; Lucy Woodward; Damon Thomas; Harvey Mason, Jr.; Kevin Kadish; Sabelle Breer	The Underdogs	3:20
2.	"Stuck"	Orrico; Kadish	Dallas Austin; Matt Serletic	3:41
3.	"Don't Look at Me"	Orrico; Mark Heimermann	Heimermann	3:36
4.	"Genuine"	Orrico; Tedd Tjornhom; Britt Huston	Tedd T	5:00
5.	"Strong Enough"	Orrico	Matt Rollings	3:56
6.	"I'm Not Missing You"	Orrico; Tawanna Dabney; Terence "Tramp Baby" Abney; Balewa Muhammad; Keir Gist; Esteban "Cito" Crandle	KayGee; Abney; Crandle	4:14
7.	"Bounce Back"	S7evon Daze; Marcellus Grove-Smith; Sylvia Bennett-Smith	Anhtony Dent	3:01
8.	"Without Love"	Eddie DeGarmo; Tasia Tjornhom	Tedd T	4:53
9.	"I Promise"	Diane Warren	The Underdogs	4:17
10.	"Dear Friend"	Orrico	Michael W. Smith	4:25
11.	"Maybe I Won't Look Back"	Orrico; Tedd Tjornhom	Tedd T	4:04
12.	"Beautiful Awakening"	Orrico; Brian West; Gerald Eaton	Track & Field	4:25
13.	"So Simple"	Stacie Orrico; Anna Slade; Tiffany Palmer; Dwayne Bastiany; Carlos Ricketts	Bastiany	3:48
14.	"I Could Be the One"	Orrico; Tedd Tjornhom; Tasia Tjornhom; Antonio Phelon	Tedd T	3:38

Special edition bonus DVD
No.	Title	Length
1.	"Stuck" (music video)
2.	"(There's Gotta Be) More to Life" (music video)
3.	"I Promise" (music video)
4.	"I Could Be the One" (music video)
5.	"Everything" (music video)
6.	"I'm Not Missing You" (music video)
7.	"I'm Not Missing You" (music video – 2nd Version)
8.	"So Simple" (music video)

== Charts ==
Chart performance for More to Life
Chart (2010)	Peak position
Japanese Albums (Oricon)	57

== Release history ==
Release history for More to Life
Region	Date	Format	Label	Ref(s)
Japan	November 28, 2007	CD; Digital download	EMI	
