= Live in Japan (Stacie Orrico album) =

Stacie Orrico: Live in Japan

Video by Stacie Orrico
- Released: September 24, 2004
- Recorded: December 2003
- Genre: CCM, pop, R&B
- Length: 60:00
- Label: ForeFront, Virgin

Stacie Orrico chronology
Stacie Orrico (2003)	Stacie Orrico: Live in Japan (2004)	Beautiful Awakening (2006)

Live in Japan is a DVD of a live concert performed by Stacie Orrico in Tokyo, Japan, in late 2003. The DVD was released on November 2, 2004.

== Track listing ==
1. "Tight"
2. "Bounce Back"
3. "Hesitation"
4. "Instead"
5. "I Promise"
6. "Strong Enough"
7. "Stuck"
8. "Can't We Be Friends"
9. "Jazz Interlude"
10. "Security"
11. "Genuine"
12. "Maybe I Won't Look Back"
13. "(There's Gotta Be) More to Life"
14. "Dear Friend"
15. "I Could Be the One"

Bonus videos (Japan version)

1. "I Promise"
2. "I Could Be the One"

Bonus videos (US and Brazilian version)

1. "Stuck"
2. "More to Life"

== Awards ==
The album was nominated for a Dove Award for Long Form Music Video of the Year at the 37th GMA Dove Awards.
