= Hand of Fate =

Hand of Fate or Hands of Fate may refer to:

== Music ==
- Hand of Fate (Amanda Perez album)
- "Hand of Fate", a song from the Rolling Stones' 1976 album Black and Blue
- "Hand of Fate", a single by American band Sons of the Desert
- Hands of Fate, an album by the heavy metal band Savage Messiah
- "Hand of Fate", a track on the soundtrack of the 2002 film, Signs
- “hand of fate” by Shiro Sagisu used on Evangelion: 3.0 + 1.0 (Thrice Upon a Time)

== Film ==
- Manos: The Hands of Fate, a 1966 independent horror film
- Praesten i Vejlby (1922 film), also known as The Hand of Fate
- Hand of Fate (film), 2013 Gambian film

== Television ==
- "Hand of Fate", Casablanca (1955) episode 4 (1955)
- "The Hand of Fate", Are You Being Served? season 3, episode 1 (1975)
- "The Hand of Fate", Conan and the Young Warriors episode 11 (1994)
- "The Hand of Fate", Superman: The Animated Series season 2, episode 20 (1997)

== Video games ==
- Hand of Fate (video game), a 2015 action-RPG
- Manos: The Hands of Fate (video game), a 2012 game based on a film of the same name
- The Legend of Kyrandia: The Hand of Fate, a 1993 adventure game

== Other uses ==
- Die glückliche Hand, an opera by Arnold Schoenberg
- Hand of Fate, a spell in the 4th edition of the Dungeons & Dragons tabletop RPG
- Hand of Fate, a virtual reality item in an episode of the animated television series Batman: The Animated Series

== See also ==
- Hand of Death
- Hand of Fatima
