= WYA =

WYA may refer to:

- Earl Lindo or Wya, Jamaican reggae musician
- Whyalla Airport in Whyalla, South Australia
- "WYA" (song), by J Abdiel and iZaak
- "WYA", a song by Carlie Hanson
- Where You At (disambiguation)

== See also ==
- WYAS (disambiguation)
