= Genuine =

Genuine may refer to:

== Companies ==
- Genuine Parts Company, a Fortune 1000 company that was founded in 1928
- Genuine Scooters, a Chicago-based scooter manufacturer
- Genuine Games, a video game company founded in early 2002

== Music ==
- Genuine (Stacie Orrico album), 2000
- Genuine (Fayray album), 2001
- "Genuine" (song), a 2000 song by Stacie Orrico
- "Genuine", a 1995 song by Canadian singer-songwriter Mae Moore

== Other uses ==
- Genuine (film), a 1920 silent film by Robert Wiene
- Genuine, a difficulty rating in Dance Dance Revolution
- Genuine (horse), a Japanese Thoroughbred racehorse
- Authenticity (philosophy)
