= Roofers (album) =

Studio album by Breaks Co-Op
- Released: 12 May 1997; 17 March 2005 (re-released under EMI)
- Genre: Electronica
- Label: Deepgrooves Entertainment (1997); EMI (2005)

Breaks Co-Op chronology
| Roofers (1997) | The Sound Inside (2005) |

Roofers is the debut album by New Zealand band Breaks Co-Op, released in 1997 under music label Deepgrooves Entertainment and then re-released in 2005 under EMI.

== Track listing ==
1. Looking Forward
2. To Faraway Lands featuring DJ Manuel Bundy
3. Sound Advice
4. Perpetual Breath
5. Let Your Hair Down
6. Solids
7. Unfettered Mind
8. Live At The Lister
9. Charging The Depth featuring Nick Atkinson (piano)
10. Such The Spot featuring Nick Atkinson (saxophone)
11. Transister featuring Jordan Reyne
