= So Simple =

So Simple may refer to:

- "So Simple", a song by Alicia Keys from her 2003 album The Diary of Alicia Keys
- "So Simple", a song by Stacie Orrico from her 2006 album Beautiful Awakening
