= Three the Hard Way =

Three the Hard Way may refer to:

- Three the Hard Way (film), a 1974 movie starring Jim Kelly
- 3 the Hard Way, a hip hop group from New Zealand
- "3 the Hard Way", a song from the 2004 album To the 5 Boroughs by the Beastie Boys
