= Candy Kisses =

Candy Kisses can refer to the following songs:

- "Candy Kisses" (George Morgan song), a 1949 American folk song
- "Candy Kisses" (Amanda Perez song), a 2007 American R&B song

Candy kiss or candy kisses can refer to:

- Hershey's Kisses, a brand of bite-sized chocolate candy
- Any small candy or confection such as Purity's candy kisses
