= Don't Look at Me =

Don't Look at Me may refer to:

- Don't Look at Me (Desperate Housewives)
- David Lynch - Don't Look at Me 1989 TV documentary on David Lynch
- "Don't Look at Me", song by Stephen Sondheim from Follies
- "Don't Look at Me", chart single by Jimmy Clanton
- "Don't Look at Me", single from Genuine (Stacie Orrico album)
- "Don't Look at Me", song by Scottish indie rock band The Twilight Sad, from No One Can Ever Know
- "Don't Look At Me (I Don't Like It)" 2011 single by The Lovely Eggs
