= Sweetest Girl =

Sweetest Girl may refer to:

- "Sweetest Girl (Dollar Bill)", a 2007 song by Wyclef Jean
- "The 'Sweetest Girl' ", a 1981 song by Scritti Politti, covered by Madness in 1986
- The Sweetest Girl, a 1988 album by Sanchez
- "The Sweetest Girl", a song by Pizzicato Five from the 1994 album Overdose
- "Sweetest Girl", a song by Eleanor Friedberger from the 2016 album New View
- "The Sweetest Girl", a 1992 single by The Mighty Asterix released by Deepgrooves Entertainment
