= Old School Prankstas =

Studio album by 3 The Hard Way
- Released: 1995

3 The Hard Way chronology
Old School Prankstas (1995)	Eyes on the Prize (2004)

Old School Prankstas is the debut album by New Zealand hip-hop group, 3 The Hard Way released in 1995. The success of the number one single "Hip Hop Holiday" led to the release of the album.

According to author Philip Hayward, the band "maintained a commercial, accessible sound" suggesting they got to the top of the charts "the easy way".

== Track listing ==
1. Intro Here It Is
2. Rock Tha Nation
3. Many Rivers
4. Bass Freak
5. Cheech Interlude
6. All Around
7. Dialog Interlude
8. DJs Nightmare
9. Hip Hop Holiday featuring Bobbylon
10. What I Gotta Do featuring Larry Killip
11. Coming At Ya (Remix)
12. Dialog Interlude
13. Everyday
14. Get Down
15. Gotta Do (Shout Outs)
