= Where You At =

Where You At may refer to:

- Where You At?, a 2002 album by Amanda Perez
- "Where You At" (Joe song), 2006
- "Where You At" (Jennifer Hudson song), 2011
- "Where You At", a 2017 song by NU'EST W
- "Where You At", a 2019 song by Loona from X X
- "WYAT (Where You At)", a 2022 song by SB19
- "WY@", a 2023 song by Brent Faiyaz
