= Ibrahim Ceesay =

- Born: 1986 (age 38–39); Gambia
- Citizenship: Gambia
- Education: Igobi College, Lagos
- Occupations: Social justice activist, human rights defender, film director
- Years active: 2010–present
- Employer: African Artists Peace Initiative (AAPI)
- Organizations: African Artists Peace Initiative (AAPI); Children and Community Development Initiative for Development (CAID); African Youth Initiative on Climate Change (AYICC)
- Known for: Director of Hand of Fate; youth and climate justice advocacy
- Notable work: Hand of Fate (2013); Sarata (2014)
- Awards: Best Indigenous Film – Nollywood & African Film Critics Awards (2013); Gambian Personality of the Year (2013); Nominated among 12 Most Influential Youth Leaders in Africa – Youth Hub Africa

Ibrahim Ceesay (born 1986) is a Gambian social justice activist, human rights defender and award-winning director of the film Hand of Fate. He is the executive director of the African artists peace initiative (AAPI) and has led various youth organizations.

== Early life and education ==
Ceesay studied at Igobi College an all boys school in Lagos for his Junior School where he launched the Green Schools Initiative with the Boy Scouts.

== Career ==
Ceesay is the executive director of Children and Community Development initiative for development (CAID) which strives towards child and community development. He is a film director and his 2013 film Hand of Fate explores issues around early marriage. Ceesay's 2014 film Sarata raises awareness of cervical cancer. In 2016, Ceesay was fired from his role as chair for the national youth council, after calling for youths to protest the death and detention of activists.

He was appointed as UNESCO Youth and Peace Ambassador, as the Executive Coordinator of the African Youth Initiative on Climate Change (AYICC) the youth climate movement in Africa and as Chairperson of the African Youth Panel Advisory body to the Danish Africa Commission. He had serves as Administrator/Secretary General of the National Federation for UNESCO Clubs and Centres, worked with the Gambia National Commission for UNESCO prior to appointment.

He launched a project called 'African Artists Unite for Climate Justice" which brings musicians together to talk about climate change through music.

== Awards and recognitions ==
Ceesay's movie Hand of Fate was awarded 'best indigenous film' in the Nollywood and African Film Critics Awards in 2013and screened in Paris, France as part of ‘UNESCO Africa Week’ . Ceesay was also Gambian personality of the year in 2013 and nominated as one of the 12 most influential youth leaders in Africa by Youth Hub Africa.

== See also ==
- Yahya Jammeh
- .Isatou Touray
- PLO Lumumba
