= Mariama Colley =

Gambian actress

- Born: Mariama Colley; 6 September 1988 (age 38); Gambia
- Occupation: Actress

Mariama Colley is a radio personality, human rights activist and actress from The Gambia. Mariama is best known for her support to society through volunteering and as the lead character in Hand of Fate.

== Career ==
She is a radio personality and an actress, she has passion for social work through volunteerism.

== Awards ==
Mariama Colley was awarded The National Certificate of Merit as Youth of the Month by The Gambian Ministry of Youth and Sports, in collaboration with the Balance Group, for her contribution to national development, nominated for African Oscars as result of the female lead role she played in the movie Hand of Fate.
