= The Sound Inside =

Studio album by Breaks Co-op
- Released: 21 March 2005
- Genre: Electronica
- Label: EMI New Zealand/Astralwerks/Parlophone

Breaks Co-op chronology
Roofers (1997)	The Sound Inside (2005)

Professional ratings
Review scores
Source	Rating
PopMatters	5/10 stars

The Sound Inside is the second album of New Zealand band Breaks Co-op, first released in 2005 under EMI New Zealand.

== Track listing ==
1. The Sound Inside
2. Wonder
3. The Otherside
4. Settle Down
5. Last Night
6. A Place For You
7. Duet
8. Question Of Freedom
9. LMA
10. Beats Interlude
11. Too Easily
12. Lay Me Down
13. Twilight
