= It's On (3 the Hard Way song) =

2003 single by 3 the Hard Way

Single by 3 the Hard Way

from the album Eyes on the Prize
- Released: 2003
- Length: 3:56
- Label: Joy
- Songwriters: Alan Jansson; Chris Ma'ia'i; Mike Paton
- Producer: Alan Jansson

3 the Hard Way singles chronology
"All Around (For tha Funk)" (1994)	"It's On" (2003)

Audio
- "It's On" on YouTube

"It's On" (subtitled "Move to This" on promotional discs) is a song by New Zealand R&B group 3 the Hard Way, released as the only single from their second studio album, Eyes on the Prize (2003), in 2003. The single entered the New Zealand Singles Chart at number one, becoming the group's second number-one single, more than 10 years after their first number-one hit, "Hip Hop Holiday".

== Track listing ==
New Zealand CD single

1. "It's On" (single edit)
2. "It's On" (remix)
3. "It's On" (video)

== Charts ==
=== Weekly charts ===
Chart (2003)	Peak position
New Zealand (Recorded Music NZ)	1

=== Year-end charts ===
Chart (2003)	Position
New Zealand (RIANZ)	47
