= Breaks Co-Op =

New Zealand band

- Origin: New Zealand
- Genre: Electronica
- Years active: 1997–present
- Label: EMI
- Members: Zane Lowe; Hamish Clark; Andy Lovegrove

Breaks Co-Op is a New Zealand band, formed in 1997 by Zane Lowe and Hamish Clark, a fusion of hip-hop and downbeat electronica. They have released three albums Roofers (1997), The Sound Inside (2005), and Sound Familiar (2014).

== History ==
Lowe was a member of hip-hop group Urban Disturbance when he began collaborating with Clark in Auckland in the 1990s. Lowe and Clark formed Breaks Co-Op, releasing the electronic album Roofers in 1997 on label Deepgrooves Entertainment before they both left New Zealand to travel and pursue other interests. They ended up in the UK, where Lowe became a radio DJ and TV presenter.

After several years hiatus, Lowe and Clark started working on new material in 2004, recruiting Andy Lovegrove from artist/producers The Away Team after hearing a vocal demo.

Released in 2005 in New Zealand, The Sound Inside was a double-platinum seller, with lead single "The Otherside" the winner of Song of the Year at the New Zealand Music Awards. Breaks Co-Op toured and relocated to the UK, where their album was released internationally by Parlophone EMI.

Breaks Co-Op released album Sound Familiar in 2014, and toured it in New Zealand. The live lineup was Lovegrove on lead vocals and guitar; Rodney Fisher on vocals, lead guitar, mandolin and percussion; Rio Hemopo on bass and vocals; Tom Atkinson on drums; and Clark on turntables, samples, and vocals.

== In culture ==
The song "The Otherside" is featured in the Season One Brothers & Sisters episode "Valentine's Day Massacre". Also from the album, the song "The Sound Inside" is featured in the Season Seven CSI: Crime Scene Investigation episode "Post Mortem".

The song "Transister" from the album Roofers features New Zealand musician Jordan Reyne as guest vocalist / lyricist.

== Discography ==
=== Studio albums ===
Year	Title	Details	Peak chart positions		Certifications
Year	Title	Details	NZ	UK	Certifications
1997	Roofers	Released: 12 May 1997; Label: Deepgrooves Entertainment	—	—	
2005	The Sound Inside	Released: 21 March 2005; Label: EMI	3	55	NZ: 2× Platinum
2014	Sounds Familiar	Released: 31 January 2014; Label: Parlophone	11	—	
"—" denotes a recording that did not chart or was not released in that territory.

=== Singles ===
Year	Title	Peak chart positions		Album
Year	Title	NZ	UK	Album
1997	"Sound Advice"	39	—	Roofers
1997	"Transistor"	—	—	Roofers
2005	"The Otherside"	10	43	The Sound Inside
2005	"Settle Down"	—	—	The Sound Inside
2006	"A Place for You"	—	—	The Sound Inside
"—" denotes a recording that did not chart or was not released in that territory.
