= Christmas Wish (EP) =

EP by Stacie Orrico
- Released: October 9, 2001
- Genre: Christmas
- Length: 24:26
- Label: ForeFront
- Producers: Mark Heimermann; Michael W. Smith; Tedd T; Michael-Anthony Taylor; The Underdogs

Stacie Orrico chronology
Genuine (2000)	Christmas Wish (2001)	Stacie Orrico (2003)

Christmas Wish is a Christmas EP by American singer Stacie Orrico. It was released by ForeFront Records on October 9, 2001. The album peaked at number 26 on the US Top Holiday Albums chart.

== Critical reception ==
Professional ratings
Review scores
Source	Rating
AllMusic	3/5 stars
Argus Leader	2.5/5 stars
The Arizona Republic	2/5
The Atlanta Constitution	D
Cross Rhythms	8/10 squares
Fort Worth Star-Telegram	2/5 stars

AllMusic rated Christmas Wish three-out-of-five stars. Argus Leader's Joel Brown wrote that in the EP, "the true meaning of Christmas is intertwined with more secular choices". Larry Rodgers and Randy Cordova of The Arizona Republic argued that, on the record, Orrico "puts a little too much Britney Spears into her vocals". John Blake, in The Atlanta Constitution, thought that Christmas Wish was "overproduced and uninspired". Cross Rhythms Chris Tozer offered the EP the most praise, describing the holiday covers as "laced with lashings of R&B - 21st century style". Fort Worth Star-Telegram writer Malcolm Mayhew labeled the EP's songs as "indistinguishable from all the other teen-pop Christmas songs bopping around out there".

== Track listing ==
Christmas Wish track listing
No.	Title	Writer(s)	Producer(s)	Length
1.	"Love Came Down"	Christina Rossetti	Michael-Anthony Taylor	3:29
2.	"Christmas Wish"	Bob Farrell	Tedd T	3:56
3.	"O Holy Night"	Adolphe Adam; Placide Cappeau	Tedd T	5:02
4.	"What Child Is This"	William Chatterton Dix	Mark Heimermann	4:22
5.	"O Come All Ye Faithful"	Traditional	Taylor	3:58
6.	"White Christmas"	Irving Berlin	Michael W. Smith	3:39
Total length:				24:26

Japanese bonus tracks
No.	Title	Writer(s)	Producer(s)	Length
7.	"The Christmas Song"	Robert Wells; Mel Tormé	The Underdogs	3:14
8.	"What Are You Doing New Year's Eve?"	Frank Loesser	The Underdogs	3:59
Total length:				30:10

Notes

- The two Japanese bonus tracks were available in the US in December 2003 on an exclusive Target single titled For Christmas.

== Charts ==
Chart performance for Christmas Wish
Chart (2001)	Peak position
US Christian Albums (Billboard)	28
US Top Holiday Albums (Billboard)	26

== Release history ==
Christmas Wish release history
Region	Date	Format	Label	Ref(s)
United States	October 9, 2001	CD; cassette	Forefront	
Japan	December 3, 2003	CD; cassette	Forefront	
