= Genuine (song) =

2000 single by Stacie Orrico

Single by Stacie Orrico

from the album Genuine
- B-side: "Genuine" (Very Real Remix)
- Released: August 1, 2000
- Recorded: Summer 1999; Antenna Studios, Franklin, Tennessee, US
- Genre: CCM, R&B
- Length: 5:00
- Label: ForeFront
- Songwriters: Tedd Tjornhom, Stacie Orrico, B. Huston
- Producer: Mooki's Soul Music

Stacie Orrico singles chronology
"Genuine" (2000)	"Everything" (2001)

"Genuine" is the debut single of American recording artist Stacie Orrico from her debut album of the same name. The song was released in the United States in August 2000, only for Christian radio stations. Written by Tedd Tjornhom, B. Huston and Stacie Orrico and produced by Mooki's Soul Music, "Genuine" is a predominantly CCM song, that is influenced by gospel and R&B.

"Genuine" received generally positive reviews from music critics, with most of them comparing her to other female starlet artists like Christina Aguilera and Britney Spears calling her the Spears/Aguilera with a powerful voice and urban style similar to Mariah Carey and Janet Jackson. This song was released as a promo single with the book Genuine: Being Real in an Artificial World, also written by Orrico. This CD-ROM includes the video for "Genuine".

The song was released as the fifth single from her debut album only to Christian stations.

== Chart performance ==
"Genuine" charted only on American Christian charts.

== Music video ==
The video is directed by Eric Welch. Throughout the video, Orrico dances and sings in an orange room with other teenagers. At the beginning of the video she is in front of a mirror watching her reflection and singing, then the reflection of herself is talking to her, while other scenes show Stacie dancing with an orange outfit. This part of the video was influenced by her mentor group Destiny's Child in the "Say My Name" video in her outfit and dancing. Orrico toured with the R&B group in 2001.

== Track listing ==
US CD

1. "Genuine" (album version)

US CD-ROM

1. "Genuine" (video)

== Official versions ==
- Main version
- Very Real Remix
