= Amanda Perez =

American contemporary R&B singer

- Origin: Fort Wayne, Indiana, U.S.
- Genres: R&B, hip hop
- Occupations: Singer, songwriter, record producer
- Years active: 2001–present
- Labels: Quinn Media, Silverstone, Powerhowse Records, Universal Records, Virgin Records, Capitol Records, EMI Music, A-Hype, Upstairs Records

Amanda Perez is an American contemporary R&B singer.

== Early life and education ==
Perez, who is of Mexican descent, was raised in Fort Wayne, Indiana. She grew up in the Waynedale community of Fort Wayne, where she attended North Side High School. She spent her teenage years selling drugs to raise money for her family. She also grew up boxing with boys, helping to mold her tough street persona.

== Career ==
Perez was discovered in Fort Wayne by a talent scout and signed to the independent record label Powerhowse/Silverstone Records in 2001. Her debut album Where U At? was released in 2002 and included the singles "Never" and "Angel". "Never" peaked at No. 79 on the Billboard Hot 100, but the album itself did not see much success until it was re-released by Virgin Records to a wider distribution area under the new title, "Angel". Perez's most popular single to date, "Angel", peaked at No. 20 on the Hot 100and No. 3 at Top 40 Radio.

Mighty Mike Quinn of Silverstone/Powerhowse Records directed and produced four music videos for Perez, which all aired on MTV, VH1 and BET. The album was produced by Quinn and co-produced by Powerhowse producer/DJ Tony Palacios. DJ Tony P. was Perez touring DJ during her initial rise to popularity and a former radio employee-friend of Quinn.

Perez notably charted at No. 7 on the popular MTV viewer request show Total Request Live. She has had moderate success since departing from the original producers in 2005.

Subsequently, she took time off to care for her mother who was diagnosed with cancer. In 2004 Quinn's Silverstone/Powerhowse label partnered to release her second album, this time with Virgin Records, as a joint effort.

"I Pray", the title track, was the first single off the album, and would prove to be the last time writer-producer Mike Quinn would work with Perez on an album. The second single, "Dedicate (Remix)", featured Layzie Bone of Bone Thugs under the direction of Quinn.

Shortly after its release, Perez parted ways with her original label and the writer-producer. Her next album, The Hand of Fate, was to be released on Virgin under Perez's direction, but she was soon released from her contract due to legal conflicts and Virgin's unwillingness to effect Quinn's original agreements.

In 2007 Upstairs Records released a special album dedicated to Perez's mother's death. The lone single from that album, "Candy Kisses" had success on the Top 40/Rhythmic Chart, peaking at No. 17.

In 2013, Perez and A-Hype Records released the single "Freak For The Weekend", the first single from the album Unexpected.

On October 21, 2016, Perez announced that she was working on her sixth studio album in an interview with Power 98.3. She intended for a December 2016 release but the album process has continued into 2023. She continues to post many clips of material she is working on via her official Facebook, Twitter, and Instagram pages. Several stand alone singles have been released over the upcoming album process including "So Free", "I Know" feat. Dave G., "Did It for Love", "I Get It" feat. Ace, "Ain't the Same", and "Heartache".

In February 2017 Perez announced that she will release a limited edition Greatest Hits album entitled 15 Years of Greatest Hits that will only be available for purchase at her live shows.

== Discography ==
=== Studio albums ===
Year	Title	Chart positions				
Year	Title	US	US R&B/HH	US Ind.	AUS	NZ
2002	Where You At?: 1st studio album; Released: April 30, 2002	—	—	—	—	—
2003	Angel: 2nd studio album; Released: February 11, 2003	73	36	39	63	39
2004	I Pray: 3rd studio album; Released: July 13, 2004	90	43	—	—	—
2007	The Hand of Fate: 4th studio album; Released: October 30, 2007	—	38	24	—	—
2013	Unexpected: 5th studio album; Released: September 3, 2013	—	—	—	—	—
"—" denotes a title that did not chart, or was not released in that territory.

=== Compilation albums ===
- 15 Years of Greatest Hits (2017)

=== Singles ===
Year	Title	Chart positions				Certifications	Album
Year	Title	US	US Pop	AUS	NZ	Certifications	Album
2002	"Never"	79	—	—	—		Where You At?
2003	"Angel"	20	3	2	1	ARIA: Platinum	Angel
2003	"I Like It"	—	—	54	—		Angel
2004	"Dedicate"	—	—	—	—		I Pray
2004	"I Pray"	101*	39	94	—		I Pray
2007	"Candy Kisses"	110*	—	—	—		The Hand of Fate
2009	"This Time"	—	—	—	—		The Hand of Fate
2013	"Freak for the Weekend"	—	—	—	—		Unexpected

"—" denotes a title that did not chart, or was not released in that territory. * denotes a title that was charted on Billboard's Bubbling Under Hot 100 chart, an extension of the Billboard Hot 100.

=== Music videos ===
Year	Song	Director
2001	"Never"	Mike Quinn, Andrew Little, Silverstone/Powerhowse and CanAmerican Films
2001	"Angel"	Mike Quinn and Silverstone/Powerhowse
2003	"Angel	Mike Quinn and Silverstone/Powerhowse
2004	"I Pray"	Mike Quinn and Silverstone/Powerhowse
2013	"Freak for the Weekend"	Rodney Pinz/A-Hype/KrazyA Ent.
2013	"Street Light" feat. JenRO	Ro Records/KrazyA Ent.
2017	"So Free"	WATCHJIMMYBALL/KrazyA Ent.
