= Angel (Amanda Perez song) =

2002 single by Amanda Perez

Single by Amanda Perez

from the album Angel
- B-side: "Love Is Pain"
- Released: August 26, 2002
- Length: 3:38
- Label: Virgin
- Songwriter: Amanda Perez
- Producer: Mike Quinn

Amanda Perez singles chronology
"Never" (2002)	"Angel" (2002)	"I Like It" (2003)

"Angel" is a song by American singer-songwriter Amanda Perez. Written by Perez and produced by Mike Quinn, "Angel" was released as a single in August 2002 and was included on Perez's second studio album of the same name, released later the same year. In the United States, the single reached the top five of the Billboard Mainstream Top 40 chart and the top 20 of the Billboard Hot 100. "Angel" was also a top-five hit in Australia and New Zealand, peaking at number one in the latter country for two weeks.

== Release ==
The song "Angel" was released to US rhythmic contemporary radio on August 26, 2002. The D-Lo Urban Remix was released to US radio as a Single Mix for promo. It was also released digitally.

== Reception ==
=== Critical ===
The review by AllMusic praised Amanda Perez's vocal performance and named it the best song on its parent album Angel.

=== Commercial ===
In the United States, it reached number 20 on the Billboard Hot 100, spending 19 weeks on the chart. On the Rhythmic chart, the song reached number 13. The song was most successful in the US on the Mainstream Top 40, where it reached number three and spent 25 total weeks. The track also hit number seven on MTV's Total Request Live. Billboard ranked the song as the 69th most-successful of 2003 in the US.

The song was also successful in Canada, where it peaked at number 12 in June 2003. On the New Zealand Singles Chart, the single reached number one, spending for two weeks atop the chart in June 2003. The following month, "Angel" reached number two on the Australian ARIA Singles Chart. "Angel" was ranked at number 13 on ARIA's list of top 100 songs of 2003 and number 15 on the New Zealand year-end chart for 2003.

Perez's subsequent singles failed to break the top 40 in any country, essentially making Perez a one-hit wonder (though she also scored a minor hit with "Never," which peaked at number 79 on the Billboard Hot 100). Additionally, it was the last song to be played as a long-distance dedication on American Top 40 in January 2004, as Ryan Seacrest replaced Casey Kasem a week later, though long-distance dedications continued on American Top 20 and American Top 10 until both shows ended in 2009.

== Music video ==
A music video was released, featuring Perez having flashbacks of her boyfriend (implied to be dead), and footage of her lighting candles. The video shows a thug who is a getaway driver for a gang and wishes to leave his criminal life behind while his girlfriend packs her things and waits for him. The gang stops and attempts to steal a car but the thug flees on foot from the theft and gets into his own car, thinking that he’s safe. However, the gang leader catches up to him and kills him in his car and flees. The music video was dedicated to two of her family members who had passed, Michael and Benitez Perez. The music video received substantial play on MTV's Total Request Live.

== Track listings ==
US CD single
No.	Title	Length
1.	"Angel"	3:38
2.	"Love Is Pain"	3:21
3.	"Angel" (dance remix)	4:21
4.	"Angel" (the video)	3:57

European and Australian CD single
No.	Title	Length
1.	"Angel"	3:38
2.	"Love Is Pain"	3:21

== Charts ==
=== Weekly charts ===
Chart (2003)	Peak position
Australia (ARIA)	2
Australian Urban (ARIA)	1
Canada (Nielsen SoundScan)	12
New Zealand (Recorded Music NZ)	1
US Billboard Hot 100	20
US Hot R&B/Hip-Hop Songs (Billboard)	57
US Pop Airplay (Billboard)	3
US Rhythmic Airplay (Billboard)	13

=== Year-end charts ===
Chart (2003)	Position
Australia (ARIA)	13
Australian Urban (ARIA)	8
New Zealand (RIANZ)	15
US Billboard Hot 100	69
US Mainstream Top 40 (Billboard)	20
US Rhythmic Top 40 (Billboard)	57

== Certifications ==
Region	Certification	Certified units/sales
Australia (ARIA)	Platinum	70,000^{^}
New Zealand (RMNZ)	Gold	5,000^{*}
^{*} Sales figures based on certification alone.^{^} Shipments figures based on certification alone.

== Release history ==
Region	Date	Format	Label	Ref.
United States	August 26, 2002	Rhythmic contemporary radio	Virgin	
United States	January 13, 2003	Contemporary hit radio	Virgin	
Australia	July 14, 2003	CD	Virgin	
