= Where You At? =

Studio album by Amanda Perez
- Released: April 30, 2002
- Genre: R&B, hip hop
- Length: 45:48
- Label: Universal
- Producer: Amanda Perez, P. Tony, Harold Road, Mike G., Mike Quinn

Amanda Perez chronology
| Where You At? (2002) | Angel (2003) |

Professional ratings
Review scores
| Source | Rating |
|---|---|
| AllMusic | 3/5 stars |

Where You At? is a 2002 album by American singer-songwriter Amanda Perez. It was released on April 30 of that year by Universal, and features the hit single "Never". Several of the songs were later featured on her 2003 album "Angel", including "Angel", "Where You At", "In My Life", and "I Like It".

== Reception ==
AllMusic's Dan LeRoy called Perez "considerably more advanced than most of her musical peers." He praised the music, which he called "a chart-conscious blend of hip-hop bangers and R&B ballads that sounds like it could slide into heavy rotation between Ja Rule and J. Lo without making anyone blink."

== Track listing ==
All songs written by Amanda Perez.

1. "Intro" – 1:19
2. "Where You At?" – 3:17
3. "I Like It" – 4:14
4. "Whoa" – 3:28
5. "Never" – 4:15
6. "No More" – 3:49
7. "Get 'Em Hype" – 3:26
8. "Angel" – 3:38
9. "Your Body Is Mine" – 3:34
10. "Too Tee Zee" – 3:47
11. "I Still Love You" – 3:53
12. "In My Life" – 3:32
13. "Love Is Pain" – 3:21

== Personnel ==
- Amanda Perez: Keyboards, piano, synthesized bass, drum and rhythm programming
- P. Tony: Additional drum and rhythm programming

Production

- Executive producer: Jethro Beau Tea
- Arranged by Amanda Perez, P. Tony and Harold Road
- Main production by Amanda Perez
- Additional production by Mike G., Mike Q., P. Tony and Harold Road
- Recorded and engineered by Theresa Farrell, Jon Hayes and Brent Miller
- Mixed by David "D-Lo" Lopez
- Mastered by Chris Bellman
