= Angel (Amanda Perez album) =

Studio album by Amanda Perez
- Released: October 15, 2002 & February 11, 2003
- Recorded: March 2002
- Genre: R&B, hip hop, pop
- Label: Virgin, PowerHowse Entertainment
- Producer: Amanda Perez, Harold Road, Mike Quinn (Mike Q.), P. Tony

Amanda Perez chronology
Where You At? (2002)	Angel (2002)	I Pray (2004)

Professional ratings
Review scores
Source	Rating
AllMusic	3/5 stars

Angel is the second album by American R&B singer Amanda Perez, initially released on October 15, 2002 by PowerHowse Entertainment Records and distributed by Mad Chemistry Distribution. The first release features a larger track listing, including several bonus tracks and one hidden bonus track. Upon switching record labels the album was reconsidered and released by Virgin Records worldwide on February 11, 2003. It features the hit single "Angel", which reached number 3 on the Billboard Pop 100 and topped the New Zealand Singles Chart.

== Track listing ==
October 15, 2002 Release by Mad Chemistry Distribution. All songs composed by Amanda Perez and Mike Quinn (Mike Q.). Additional vocals Mike Q.

No.	Title	Length
1.	"Angel"	3:38
2.	"I Like It"	4:14
3.	"Never"	4:15
4.	"No More"	3:49
5.	"In My Life"	3:32
6.	"Your Body Is Mine"	3:33
7.	"I Still Love You"	3:53
8.	"Love Is Pain"	3:21
9.	""The Call" (Phoner) Feat. Mike Q."	1:19
10.	"Where You At"	3:17
11.	"Get 'Em Hype"	3:26
12.	"Whoa"	3:28
13.	"Too Tee Zee"	3:47
14.	"I Like It (Feat. Preemo)"	3:23
15.	"Never "Re-Freaked" Version"	4:05
16.	"Angel (Guitar Version)"	4:02
17.	"I Like It (Harold's Euro Mix)"	3:59
18.	"Never (Tony P. House Mix)"	5:32
19.	"I Like It (Tony P. Booty Mix)"	4:04
20.	"Untitled Hidden Track"	4:32

== Track listing ==
February 11, 2003 Release by Virgin Records. All songs composed by Amanda Perez and Mike Quinn (Mike Q.). Additional vocals Mike Q.

No.	Title	Length
1.	"I Like It"	4:12
2.	"In My Life"	3:32
3.	"Angel"	3:38
4.	"I Still Love You"	3:56
5.	"Never"	4:13
6.	"The Call (Skit)(Interlude) F/ Mike Q."	1:21
7.	"Your Body Is Mine"	3:34
8.	"Love Is Pain"	3:21
9.	"No More"	3:49
10.	"Whoa"	3:06
11.	"Where You At?"	3:17
12.	"Angel [Slow Jam Rap]"	3:57

== Personnel ==
- Amanda Perez: Vocals
- Mike Q. (Mike Quinn): Additional Vocals, Skit & Writing, Producer, A&R
- Yecj Namsorg: Acoustic, Electric, Classical & Spanish Guitars, Bass, Keyboards, Synthesizers
- P. Tony: Drum & Beat Programming

== Charts ==
Chart performance for Angel
Chart (2003)	Peak position
Australian Albums (ARIA)	63
New Zealand Albums (RMNZ)	39
US Billboard 200	73
US Top R&B/Hip-Hop Albums (Billboard)	36
