= Beautiful Awakening =

Studio album by Stacie Orrico
- Released: August 14, 2006
- Genres: Pop; R&B
- Length: 47:40
- Label: Virgin
- Producers: Dallas Austin; Terence "Tramp Baby" Abney; Dwayne Bastiany; Lashaunda "Babygirl" Carr; Marcellus "Handz Down" Dawson; Dent; KayGee; Novel; She'kspere; Track & Field; Trendsettas; The Underdogs

Stacie Orrico chronology
Stacie Orrico (2003)	Beautiful Awakening (2006)	More to Life: The Best of Stacie Orrico (2007)

Singles from Beautiful Awakening
- 1. "I'm Not Missing You" Released: August 5, 2006; 2. "So Simple" Released: October 2006

Beautiful Awakening is the third studio album by American singer Stacie Orrico. It was first released on August 14, 2006, and marked the singer's debut with solely Virgin Records following her transition from ForeFront Records. Conceived during a longer hiatus during which Orrico returned to Seattle and took a waitressing job at a seafood restaurant after bouts with exhaustion following her international breakthrough with her self-titled second album (2003) and subsequent touring, the singer consulted a variety of musicians to work with her on new material. The songs, crafted along with frequent collaborators such as Dallas Austin and Anthony Dent as well as Dwayne Bastiany, KayGee, Novel, She'kspere, and Track & Field, took Orrico's work further away from the teen pop and more into R&B-Pop genre.

Upon its release, the album received generally positive reviews from critics who complimented Orrico's vocal talent and pop charisma displayed on Beautiful Awakening. However, some felt that it lacked musical growth. Commercially, the album was less successful than her previous album Stacie Orrico (2003), though it reached the top ten on the Japanese Albums Chart and was certified gold by the Recording Industry Association of Japan (RIAJ). "I'm Not Missing You," the album's lead single, became a top 20 hit in Belgium, the Czech Republic, New Zealand, and Scotland. A second single, "So Simple," failed to chart. In the United States, Beautiful Awakening was not released, even when being green lit twice. Orrico left the label in 2007 while Virgin Records was being merged with Capitol Records. She planned to release the album under a new label, but these plans never came to fruition.

== Background ==
In 2003, Orrico's career exploded when "Stuck" and "(There's Gotta Be) More to Life", the first two singles from her self-titled second album, became international top ten hits. Overwhelmed by the global success, the singer soon found herself on the hectic music business treadmill and, instead of continue recording, opted to return to her family in Seattle and took a waitressing job at a neighborhood seafood restaurant. During her hiatus, Orrico began writing new material and wound up with 55 new songs.

== Singles ==
"I'm Not Missing You" was released as the album's lead single on August 5, 2006. The song charted at number 19 on the Bubbling Under Hot 100 Singles chart, an extension of the twenty-five songs that failed to make the Billboard Hot 100. Diane Martel directed its accompanying music video.

Orrico re-shot the video for release in the U.S. and Canada. It was directed by the husband-wife directing team Honey. The redone video is about Orrico being happy about not being attached to anyone. Unlike the original version, Orrico provided all of her own wardrobe. The video premiered on Yahoo! Music on December 6, 2006. The song, as well as Stacie, is featured as one of iTunes' 39 Girls of Summer.

"So Simple" was the second single for Europe and Asia released on January 26, 2007, in Europe and Australia at around the same time having been released in Southeast Asia in October 2006. The video for "So Simple" was directed by Ray Kay and was shot in Calabasas, California between the 8 and 9 of September 2006. Kay premiered "So Simple" online towards the end of October 2006 on YouTube.

== Critical reception ==
Professional ratings
Review scores
Source	Rating
AllMusic	4/5 stars
Christianity Today	2.5/5 stars
Cross Rhythms	9/10 squares
Jesus Freak Hideout	3/5 stars
MTV Asia	7/10

Beautiful Awakening received generally mixed to positive reviews. Billboard critic Chuck Taylor called the album "a majestic follow-up and the best blue-eyed soul this side of Motown." He felt that it "percolates with confidence and plentiful momentum" and noted that the album "has a definable signature throughout as if Orrico is performing the set live before your eyes. There are many highlights." Mike Rimmer, writing for Cross Rhythms, found that the album was "packed with the R&B pop that is so familiar of her style, all topped by her excellent voice [..] As always Orrico is superb vocally [...] Whilst not as immediate and poppy as her last release, this new slightly more mature approach suits her just fine."

AllMusic editor Stephen Thomas Erlewine gave a positive review. He found that he album finds "Orrico not only delivering more of the R&B soaked pop she perfected on her 2003 self-titled sophomore effort, but also maturing as an artist and a woman. Only 17 when she released her previous album, Orrico owns her womanhood here, focusing on such subjects as falling love and keeping true to yourself [...] These are heartfelt, hummable and sometimes funky tracks that truly showcase Orrico's growing vocal talent and pop charisma." Andree Farias form Christianity Today found that he album lacked "musical growth" and called it "a mild disappointment considering the potential Orrico showed" before. He remarked that "a couple of these songs are some of Orrico's most inspired, self-reflective performances to date [but] by comparison, though, the rest is all lighthearted stuff. Some of it is even silly, teen-crush fare."

== Chart performance ==
Beautiful Awakening failed to reprise the success of Orrico's self-titled previous album (2003). It reached the top ten on the Japanese Albums Chart, peaking at number 8, and reached the top 20 on the UK R&B Albums chart, peaking at number 15. It also entered the top 40 of the Swiss Albums Chart.

== Track listing ==
Beautiful Awakening track listing
No.	Title	Writer(s)	Producer(s)	Length
1.	"So Simple"	Stacie Orrico; Anna Slade; Tiffany Palmer; Dwayne Bastiany; Carlos Ricketts	Bastiany	3:48
2.	"I'm Not Missing You"	Orrico; Tawanna Dabney; Terence "Tramp Baby" Abney; Balewa Muhammad; Keir Gist; Esteban "Cito" Crandle	KayGee; Abney; Crandle	4:03
3.	"Dream You"	Orrico; Novel; Dallas Austin	Austin; Novel	3:27
4.	"Easy to Luv You"	Orrico; Stevenson; Novel; Tony Reyes	Morales	4:29
5.	"Save Me"	Orrico; Lashaunda Carr; Kevin "Shekspere" Briggs; Nate Butler	Briggs; Carr	4:06
6.	"Take Me Away"	Dabney; Eric Daniels; Marcellus "Handz Down" Dawson; Johnathan Lafayette; Michael Franks; Gist	KayGee; Trendsettas	3:17
7.	"Babygirl"	Orrico; Stevenson; Novel	Austin; Novel	3:37
8.	"Wait"	Orrico; Jasper Cameron; Novel; Tony Reyes	Novel	3:29
9.	"Is It Me"	Lonnie Liston Smith; Anthony Dent; Nastacia "Nazz" Kendall	Anthony Dent	4:01
10.	"Don't Ask Me to Stay"	Orrico; Dabney; Phil "Taj" Jackson; Joel Kipnis; Abney; Gist; Crandle	KayGee; Abney; Crandle	4:47
11.	"I Can't Give It Up"	Orrico; Carr; Briggs; Butler	Briggs; Carr	4:32
12.	"Beautiful Awakening"	Orrico; Brian West; Gerald Eaton	Track & Field	4:25

US Walmart edition bonus download
No.	Title	Writer(s)	Producer(s)	Length
13.	"Tantrum"	Orrico; West; Eaton	Track & Field	4:51

Digital edition bonus track
No.	Title	Writer(s)	Producer(s)	Length
13.	"Addictive"	Orrico; Novel; Reyes	Novel	4:03

Japanese edition bonus tracks
No.	Title	Writer(s)	Producer(s)	Length
13.	"Frustrated"	Orrico; Smith; Anthony Anderson; Dane Deviller; Sean Hosein	Novel	3:53
14.	"Brush 'Em Off" (featuring Novel)	Orrico; Stevenson	Novel	4:20

Sample credits

- "So Simple" contains a sample from "Ex-Factor" as performed by Lauryn Hill.
- "Take Me Away" contains a sample from "On My Way Home to You" as performed by Michael Franks.
- "Is It Me" contains a sample from "A Garden of Peace" as performed by Lonnie Liston Smith and "Dead Presidents II" as performed by Jay-Z.

== Production ==
Credits adapted from AllMusic.

- Terence "Tramp Baby" Abney – producer
- Dallas Austin – producer
- Dwayne Bastiany – engineer, instrumentation, producer, programming
- Yvan Bing – assistant engineer
- Dawn Boonyachlito – stylist
- Lashaunda "Babygirl" Carr – producer
- Anthony Dent – engineer, instrumentation, producer, programming
- Rob Herrera – engineer
- Chris Jenkins – assistant engineer
- KayGee – producer
- Carlton Lynn – engineer, mixing
- Graham Marsh – assistant engineer
- Novel – producer
- Stacie Orrico – creative director, producer, vocal producer
- Tiffany Palmer – vocal producer
- Herb Powers – mastering
- Greg Price – mixing
- Carlos Ricketts – vocal producer
- Michelle Ryang – A&R
- She'kspere – producer
- Rick Sheppard – engineer, sound design
- Track & Field – producer
- Trendsettas – producer
- The Underdogs – producer
- Josh Wilbur – engineer, mixing

== Charts ==
Chart performance for Beautiful Awakening
Chart (2006)	Peak position
Austrian Albums (Ö3 Austria)	61
German Albums (Offizielle Top 100)	51
Japanese Albums (Oricon)	8
Swiss Albums (Schweizer Hitparade)	39
UK Albums (Official Charts)	64
UK R&B Albums (Official Charts)	15

== Certifications ==
Certifications for Beautiful Awakening
Region	Certification	Certified units/sales
Japan (RIAJ)	Gold	100,000^{^}
^{^} Shipments figures based on certification alone.
