= Hand of Death =

Hand of Death or Hands of Death may refer to:

== Films ==
- Hand of Death (1949 film), an Italian drama film
- Hand of Death (1962 film), an American horror film
- Hand of Death (1976 film), a Hong Kong martial arts film
- Nurse Sherri, a 1978 American horror film also known as Hands of Death
- Unmasked Part 25, a 1988 British slasher film also known as Hand of Death

== Other uses ==
- Hands of Death (Burn Baby Burn), a song by Rob Zombie and Alice Cooper
- Chironex, a genus of box jellyfish that is named "hand of death" in Latin
