= WYAS =

WYAS may refer to:

- WYAS (FM), a radio station (92.1 FM) licensed to Luquillo, Puerto Rico
- Archaeological Services WYAS, part of West Yorkshire Joint Services, England
- West Yorkshire Archive Service, part of West Yorkshire Joint Services, England
- WZOL, a Puerto Rican radio station (98.9 FM) which held the call sign WYAS from 2007 to 2009
