= Hip Hop Holiday =

Single by 3 the Hard Way

from the album Old School Prankstas
- B-side: "Get Down"
- Released: 1994
- Studio: Revolver (Auckland, New Zealand)
- Length: 3:39
- Label: Deepgrooves Entertainment
- Songwriters: Chris Ma'ia'i; Lance Manuel; Mike Paton; Eric Stewart; Graham Gouldman
- Producers: Angus McNaughton; Hang 'Em High Productions

3 the Hard Way singles chronology
"Hip Hop Holiday" (1994)	"Many Rivers" (1994)

"Hip Hop Holiday" a song by New Zealand hip hop group 3 the Hard Way. Released as their debut single in 1994, it reached number one in New Zealand and number 17 in Australia. A mid-song reggae breakdown was provided by Bobbylon of the Hallelujah Picassos.

== Background ==
The song was built around a substantial interpolation of "Dreadlock Holiday" by 10cc. However, the rights were never cleared, resulting in the song being officially credited to "Dreadlock Holiday" songwriters Eric Stewart, Graham Gouldman, with all royalties going to the pair. "Hip Hop Holiday" was nominated for Single of the Year at the 1995 New Zealand Music Awards.

== Music video ==
A music video was made for "Hip Hop Holiday", directed by Clinton Phillips. The video was filmed in Auckland, New Zealand and features the group driving around the city in a convertible and hosting a house party in suburban Auckland.

== Track listings ==
- CD single
1. "Hip Hop Holiday" (Radio Mix) - feat Bobbylon
2. "Get Down" (First Up Mix)
3. "Hip Hop Holiday" (Freestyle Mix)
4. "Get Down" (Extended Mix)

== Charts ==
=== Weekly charts ===
Weekly chart performance for "Hip Hop Holiday"
Chart (1994)	Peak position
Australia (ARIA)	17
New Zealand (Recorded Music NZ)	1

=== Year-end charts ===
Year-end chart performance for "Hip Hop Holiday"
Chart (1994)	Position
Australia (ARIA)	93
New Zealand (RIANZ)	24

== Certifications ==
Region	Certification	Certified units/sales
New Zealand (RMNZ)	Gold	5,000^{*}
^{*} Sales figures based on certification alone.
