= Hand of Fate (film) =

2013 Gambian film

- Directed by: Ibrahim Ceesay
- Produced by: Ibrahim Ceesay
- Starring: Mariama Colley; John Charles Njie
- Release date: 2013
- Country: Gambia

Hand of Fate is a 2013 Gambian film which focuses on human rights issues. It provides insights into the situation of teenage girls who are given out to marriage by their parent without their consent or knowledge and how their education and future carriers are being affected along the way. The Children and Community Initiative for Development in partnership with the Mandingmorry Foundation for Performing Arts (MANFOPA) made this film possible.

The film was based on a 2009 book written by the Gambian playwright and theater director Janet Badjan Young. Ibrahim Ceesay produced and directed the film.

== Plot ==
The film is about a young girl who had her future taken away from her when she was forced to marry a man she did not love.

== Cast ==
- Mariama Colley
- John Charles Njie
- Cornelius Gomez
- Oley Saidykhan
- Suzy Joh
- Babette Mendy Jalllow

== Awards ==
Hand of Faith won the best indigenous film in Nolloywood and African Film Critics Awards (African Oscars) held in Washington, D.C., on the 14th of September 2013.
