= Deepgrooves Entertainment =

- Founded: 1991
- Founder: Bill Lattimer; Mark Tierney; Kane Massey
- Status: Defunct (2000)
- Distributor: Festival Records
- Genre: Pop, urban, hip hop, jazz, instrumental
- Country of origin: New Zealand
- Location: Auckland
- Official website: www.deepgrooves.co.nz

Deepgrooves was an Auckland, New Zealand-based independent record label formed in 1991 by Bill Lattimer, Mark Tierney and Kane Massey. Tierney left the label eighteen months after the initial release and Lattimer followed two months later. Massey continued with the label for approximately ten years working as producer or executive producer on over 20 albums. Deepgrooves is widely seen as being one of the labels at the forefront of the birth of New Zealand's modern music industry in the early 1990s.

Distributed by Festival Records (NZ) Ltd., Deepgrooves was responsible for a series of influential jazz and urban releases including early recordings and production work from Zane Lowe, Phillip Fuemana, Justyn Pilbrow, Simon Holloway, Mike Hodgson, Anthony Ioasa, Joost Langeveld and Andrew Morton (a.k.a. The Submariner). Throughout the 1990s, the label and its artists were nominated for numerous New Zealand Music Awards including, but not limited to, Most Promising Group and Most Promising Female. It secured wins for Jazz Album of the Year twice. The label also registered numerous Top 10 and Top 40 chart placings over the decade, with its biggest commercial success being the 1994 NZ number one hit, "Hip Hop Holiday" by the group 3 The Hard Way, the first New Zealand hip hop single to reach number one.

In 1995, Massey established the label's in-house recording studio and film production company, Kaiun Digital, with Chris Sinclair and Dean Mackenzie. In addition to officially recording and filming the majority of the label's material, Kaiun also went on to record a number of award-winning albums for other New Zealand artists. Most notable was Dam Native's Kaupapa Driven Rhymes Uplifted (1997), produced by Zane Lowe, and numerous recordings for Philip Fuemana's Urban Pasifika record label. Massey also started a sub-label called Lost Records, to release guitar-based music from the likes of Greg Fleming, Thorn, and Jordan Reyne.

Although Deepgrooves recorded over 20 albums during its 10-year life span, a number from the label's later years still remain unreleased. The label ceased production at the end of the decade.

== Artists ==
- 2R2S AKA Riot Riddum Sound System
- 3 The Hard Way
- Babel
- Bi-Plane
- Breaks Co-op
- Cinema
- Colony
- Color Climax
- Combinations
- DNE
- Ermehn
- Freaker
- Freebass
- Fuemana
- Grace
- Greg Fleming
- Jamoa Jam
- Joy
- Jordan Reyne
- Jules Issa
- Lole
- Love And Bass
- Nemesis Dub Systems
- Pause
- Rhythm And Business
- Soundfoundation
- Sulata
- The Mighty Asterix
- The New Loungehead
- The Projector
- Thorn
- Urban Disturbance
- Unitone HiFi

== Discography ==
=== Albums ===
- Deepgrooves - Compilation (1991)
- The Projector Mix - The Projector (1992)
- Deep in the Pacific of Bass - Compilation
- A Multitrack Situation - Nemesis Dub Systems (1993)
- Raw - Freebass (1993)
- Instrumental Killers - Compilation (1993)
- Ghosts Are White - Greg Fleming (1993)
- Thorn - Thorn (1993)
- 37 Degrees Latitude - Urban Disturbance (1994)
- New Urban Polynesian - Fuemana (1994)
- Old Skool Prankstas - 3 The Hard Way (1994)
- Found in You - Jules Issa (1995)
- Deepgrooves 95 - Compilation (1995)
- Black Sand Shore - Grace (1995)
- Kia Koe - Sulata (1996)
- Roofers - Breaks Co-op (1997)
- Birds of Prey - Jordan Reyne (1997)
- Came A Weird Way - The New Loungehead (1998)
- Samoans PTII - Ermehn (1998)
- Sofa So Good ~ The Producers Selection - Compilation (1999)
- Pacific - Compilation (2000)

=== Singles ===
- Dangerous Game - Jules Issa (1991)
- The Sweetest Girl - The Mighty Asterix (1992)
- Sitting by the Telephone - Unitone HiFi (1992)
- Ram Dance Hall - Sound Foundation (1992)
- No Flint No Flame - Urban Disturbance (1992)
- Skin To Skin - Grace (1993)
- A Is For Atom - Babel (1993)
- Colony R.I.P - Colony (1993)
- Hip Hop Holiday - 3 The Hard Way (1994)
- Confessions - Grace (1994)
- Closer - Fuemana (1994)
- Black Sand Shore - Grace (1994)
- Many Rivers - 3 The Hard Way (1994)
- Impressions - Urban Disturbance (1994)
- Seasons - Fuemana (1994)
- Discomfort in Their Eyes - Jules Issa (1994)
- Many Rivers - 3 The Hard Way (1994)
- Discomfort in Their Eyes - Jules Issa (1994)
- Rocket Love - Fuemana (1994)
- Kuru - Cinema (1994)
- All Around - 3 The Hard Way (1995)
- Right - Color Climax (1995)
- Desert Moon - Grace (1995)
- Robert Jane - Urban Disturbance (1995)
- Walls of Steel - Ermehn (1995)
- Never - Sulata (1995)
- Cool World - Grace (1995)
- What I Gotta Do - 3 The Hard Way (1995)
- Figure This Kids - Urban Disturbance (1995)
- Mancini - Sulata (1996)
- Not Today - Sulata (1996)
- Cloth - The New Loungehead (1997)
- Feel Like Making Love - Lole (1997)
- Not Today - Sulata (1997)
- Sound Advice - Breaks Co-op (1997)
- Don't Be Late - Ermehn (1998)
- Only - Pause (1998)
