= 3 the Hard Way =

- Origin: New Zealand
- Genres: hip hop
- Years active: 1994–2005
- Past members: Mighty Boy C; DJ Mike Mixx; DJ Damage

3 The Hard Way were a New Zealand hip hop group formed in 1994. They are best known for their two New Zealand number one singles, "Hip Hop Holiday" from 1994, and "It's On (Move to This)" from 2003.

== History ==
3 The Hard Way's first release was "Hip Hop Holiday", released on Deepgrooves Entertainment in 1994. The song spent three weeks at the top of the New Zealand singles chart, selling in excess of 7,500 copies. Following the success of the record and the top-ten status of its follow-up, "Many Rivers", the group released their debut album later that year, Old School Prankstas.

"Hip Hop Holiday" also charted in Australia, peaking at No. 17 on the ARIA singles chart, and becoming the 93rd highest-selling single of 1994 in Australia. The song featured an element of "Dreadlock Holiday" by 10cc. Due to a mix up with the clearance rights, all of this song's royalties now go to 10cc members Graham Gouldman and Eric Stewart.

At the end of 1995, after a dispute with Deepgrooves, the group decided to take a break. That break became a lengthy hiatus, and, despite recording a number of demos, it was not until a chance meeting with producer Alan Jansson in 2001 that the group signed a deal with Jansson and Simon Grigg's Joy label through Sony Music.

3 The Hard Way released their second album Eyes on the Prize in November 2003. It peaked at number 14 in New Zealand. The first single released from this album, "It's On (Move to This)", which featured R&B singer Clement Karauti, went to No. 1 after 4 weeks on the New Zealand charts, and made further New Zealand music history when 3 The Hard Way became the only NZ artist/s to take the No. 1 spot from another NZ artist twice. This time, their single replaced Scribe's "Stand Up", which went on to spend a total of 12 weeks at the top of the NZ charts.

Former member Lance 'DJ Damage' Manuel did not rejoin the band when they reformed. The band has been quiet since.

Old School Prankstas was reissued by Joy Records in 2012.

== Original Band members ==
- Chris 'Mighty Boy C' Maiai
- Mike 'DJ Mike Mixx' Paton
- Lance 'DJ Damage' Manuel

== Discography ==
=== Albums ===
Date	Title	Label	Chart position	Certification	Catalog number
Date	Title	Label	NZ	Certification	Catalog number
1994	Old School Prankstas	Deepgrooves Entertainment	50		DG037
2003	Eyes on the Prize	Joy Records	14		JOY 105

=== Singles ===
Year	Single	Peak chart positions		Certification	Album
Year	Single	NZ	AUS	Certification	Album
1994	"Hip Hop Holiday"	1	17	RMNZ: Gold	Old School Prankstas
1994	"Many Rivers"	10	88		Old School Prankstas
1994	"All Around"	22	—		Old School Prankstas
2003	"It's On (Move to This)"	1	—		Eyes on the Prize
