= Hand of Fate (Amanda Perez album) =

The Hand of Fate

Studio album by Amanda Perez
- Released: October 13, 2007

Amanda Perez chronology
I Pray (2004)	The Hand of Fate (2007)	Unexpected (2013)

The Hand of Fate is the fourth album by artist Amanda Perez, released on October 13, 2007. Amanda Perez released two songs related to the album, "Radio" and "Don't Wanna Love You", on her personal Myspace page.

== Track listing ==
1. "Don't Deserve You" (3:42)
2. "Candy Kisses" (4:11)
3. "Come Home" (4:13)
4. "Never Find NoBody Like Me" (4:20)
5. Please (4:21)
6. "Goodbye (Song for My Mother)" (4:11)
7. "Why" (3:27)
8. "Rain" (3:53)
9. "24's" (3:40)
10. "Feel Good" (3:53)
11. "These Arms" (4:47)
12. "It's Too Late" (4:30)

== Singles ==
- "Candy Kisses" (2007) (Bubbling Under Hot 100 Singles #10)

== Credits ==
- Carlos Fernandez: Art Direction, Design, Photography
- James Hoover: Mixing
- John Lopez: Executive Producer
- Hal Fitzgerald: Mixing
- Amanda Perez: Producer, Executive Producer
