= I'm Not Missing You =

2006 single by Stacie Orrico

Single by Stacie Orrico

from the album Beautiful Awakening
- B-side: "Tantrum"; "Frustrated"
- Released: June 20, 2006
- Studio: Divine Mills (Bloomfield, New Jersey)
- Genre: Pop; R&B
- Length: 3:43 (radio edit); 4:12 (album version)
- Label: Virgin
- Songwriters: Stacie Orrico; Keir "KayGee" Gist; Tawanna Dabney; Terence "Tramp Baby" Abney; Esteban Crandle; Balewa Muhammad
- Producers: KayGee; Terence Abney

Stacie Orrico singles chronology
| "Strong Enough" (2005) | "I'm Not Missing You" (2006) | "So Simple" (2006) |

"I'm Not Missing You" is a song by American singer-songwriter Stacie Orrico from her third studio album Beautiful Awakening. It was written by Orrico along with Keir "KayGee" Gist, Terence "Tramp Baby" Abney, Esteban Crandle, Tawanna Dabney, and Balewa Muhammad, and produced by KayGee and Terence "Tramp Baby" Abney. "I'm Not Missing You" was released as the album's first single in June 2006.

== Song information ==
The song was produced by KayGee (formerly of Naughty by Nature) and Terence "Tramp Baby" Abney of Divine Mill known for their work in the R&B genre with acts like Next and Jaheim. The single was released as a download on June 6 and was played on radio from June 20 (it only appeared on the Bubbling Under Hot 100). The song received airplay on the radio, especially in the UK, and was released there on August 21, 2006, giving Orrico her fifth top-40 UK hit.

== Music video ==
The video was directed by known video director Diane Martel. It was filmed on May 31 and June 1. The video basically illustrates Orrico's struggle as a lounge singer to get control from her boyfriend. Orrico re-shot the video for release in the US and Canada. It was directed by the husband-wife directing team Honey. It was estimated to have been filmed in Los Angeles on October 26 and 27. The redone video is about Orrico's being happy about not being attached to anyone. Unlike the original version all of Orrico's wardrobe was provided by herself. The video premiered on Yahoo! Music on December 6.

== Track listings ==
UK CD1
| No. | Title | Writer(s) | Producer(s) | Length |
|---|---|---|---|---|
| 1. | "I'm Not Missing You" (radio edit) | Orrico; Tawanna Dabney; Terence "Tramp Baby" Abney; Balewa Muhammad; Keir Gist; Esteban "Cito" Crandle | KayGee; Abney; Crandle | 3:43 |
| 2. | "Tantrum" | Orrico; Brian West; Gerald Eaton | Track & Field | 4:51 |

UK CD2
| No. | Title | Writer(s) | Producer(s) | Length |
|---|---|---|---|---|
| 1. | "I'm Not Missing You" (radio edit) | Orrico; Dabney; Abney; Muhammad; Gist; Crandle | KayGee; Abney; Crandle | 3:43 |
| 2. | "Tantrum" | Orrico; West; Eaton | Track & Field | 4:51 |
| 3. | "I'm Not Missing You" (Jason Nevins remix) | Orrico; Dabney; Abney; Muhammad; Gist; Crandle | KayGee; Abney; Crandle; Jason Nevins^{[a]} | 3:58 |
| 4. | "I'm Not Missing You" (Shake Ya Cookie mix) | Orrico; Dabney; Abney; Muhammad; Gist; Crandle | KayGee; Abney; Crandle; Dean Gillard^{[a]}; Matt Ward^{[a]} | 6:31 |
| 5. | "I'm Not Missing You" (CD-ROM video) |

German and Australian CD single
| No. | Title | Writer(s) | Producer(s) | Length |
|---|---|---|---|---|
| 1. | "I'm Not Missing You" (Radio Edit) | Orrico; Dabney; Abney; Muhammad; Gist; Crandle | KayGee; Abney; Crandle | 3:43 |
| 2. | "Tantrum" | Orrico; West; Eaton | Track & Field | 4:51 |
| 3. | "Frustrated" | Orrico; Lonnie Liston Smith; Anthony Anderson; Dane Deviller; Sean Hosein | Novel | 3:53 |
| 4. | "I'm Not Missing You" (Full Phatt Underground Remix) | Orrico; Dabney; Abney; Muhammad; Gist; Crandle | KayGee; Abney; Crandle; Matt Ward^{[a]} | 4:13 |

== Charts ==
=== Weekly charts ===
Weekly chart performance for "I'm Not Missing You"
| Chart (2006) | Peak position |
|---|---|
| Australia (ARIA) | 26 |
| Austria (Ö3 Austria Top 40) | 39 |
| Belgium (Ultratip Bubbling Under Flanders) | 12 |
| Czech Republic Airplay (ČNS IFPI) | 11 |
| Germany (GfK) | 32 |
| Ireland (IRMA) | 38 |
| Netherlands (Dutch Top 40 Tipparade) | 7 |
| Netherlands (Single Top 100) | 30 |
| New Zealand (Recorded Music NZ) | 18 |
| Scottish Singles Sales (Official Charts) | 18 |
| Slovakia Airplay (ČNS IFPI) | 77 |
| South Korea International (Circle) | 34 |
| Switzerland (Schweizer Hitparade) | 25 |
| UK Singles (Official Charts) | 22 |

=== Year-end charts ===
Year-end chart performance for "I'm Not Missing You"
| Chart (2006) | Position |
|---|---|
| Australia (ARIA) | 83 |

== Release history ==
Release dates and formats for "I'm Not Missing You"
| Region | Date | Format | Label(s) | Ref. |
|---|---|---|---|---|
| United States | June 20, 2006 | Contemporary hit radio | Virgin | |
