= I Could Be the One (Stacie Orrico song) =

2004 single by Stacie Orrico

Single by Stacie Orrico

from the album Stacie Orrico
- Released: May 31, 2004
- Studio: Antenna (Franklin, Tennessee)
- Length: 3:38
- Label: ForeFront; Virgin
- Songwriters: Stacie Orrico; Antonio Phelon; Tasia Tjornhorn; Tedd T
- Producer: Tedd T

Stacie Orrico singles chronology
"I Promise" (2004)	"I Could Be the One" (2004)	"Instead" (2004)

Music video
- "I Could Be the One" on YouTube

"I Could Be the One" is the fourth and final mainstream single from American singer-songwriter Stacie Orrico's self-titled second album. It was a limited release, being issued in the United Kingdom and Europe. It did not fare as well as the first three singles but nonetheless became her fourth top-40 hit in the UK.

== Music video ==
The video for the song was done in the same vein as the "Stuck" video, which was also directed by Diane Martel and also features Orrico's cousin, actor Trevor Wright. The version of the song in the video is slightly longer than that appeared on the album, with an extra chorus between the breakdown and third verse. This version has never been commercially available.

== Track listings ==
UK CD1 and European CD single

1. "I Could Be the One" (album version)
2. "Stuck" (acoustic performance)

UK CD2

1. "I Could Be the One" (album version)
2. "Stuck" (Earthlink Live)
3. "Tight" (Earthlink Live)
4. "I Could Be the One" (video)

European maxi-CD single

1. "I Could Be the One" (album version)
2. "Stuck" (Earthlink Live)
3. "Tight" (Earthlink Live)

== Charts ==
Weekly chart performance for "I Could Be the One"
Chart (2004)	Peak position
Belgium (Ultratip Bubbling Under Flanders)	16
Belgium (Ultratip Bubbling Under Wallonia)	18
Ireland (IRMA)	26
Scottish Singles Sales (Official Charts)	36
UK Singles (Official Charts)	34
