= Stacie Orrico (album) =

Studio album by Stacie Orrico
- Released: March 25, 2003
- Genres: Pop; R&B; CCM
- Length: 43:43
- Labels: ForeFront; Virgin
- Producers: Dallas Austin; Tedd T; Eddie DeGarmo; Dave Deviller; Greg Ham; Sean Hosien; Harvey Mason, Jr.; Mooki; Stacie Orrico; Matt Rolling; Matt Serletic

Stacie Orrico chronology
Christmas Wish (2001)	Stacie Orrico (2003)	Beautiful Awakening (2006)

Singles from Stacie Orrico
- 1. "Stuck" Released: February 3, 2003; 2. "(There's Gotta Be) More to Life" Released: July 14, 2003; 3. "I Promise" Released: January 12, 2004; 4. "I Could Be the One" Released: May 31, 2004

Stacie Orrico is the second studio album by American singer Stacie Orrico. It was released by ForeFront Records and Virgin Records on March 25, 2003, in the United States. Initially conceived as a Contemporary Christian music album, much in style of Orrico's debut album Genuine (2000), the album was titled Say It Again and expected to be released in 2002, featuring production by Anthony Dent and Tedd T, among others. Additional recording sessions with mainstream producers Dallas Austin and The Underdogs led to a different musical direction however and resulted in the renaming of the project. Stylistically, the album mixes the singer's native Christian music with more pop and R&B styles, but also features incorporation of teen pop and dance music.

Stacie Orrico received generally favorable reviews from music critics who praised the songs, but some said that it was mixed with different genres. The album peaked at number fifty-nine on the US Billboard 200, while also reaching the top spot on the Billboard Top Christian Albums chart, and was certified Gold by the Recording Industry Association of America (RIAA). It peaked in the top ten in different countries, including Japan and Norway, and the top twenty in Austria, Germany, New Zealand, and Switzerland. Stacie Orrico produced the international top ten hits "Stuck" and "(There's Gotta Be) More to Life" and was nominated for a Grammy Award for Best Pop/Contemporary Gospel Album.

== Background ==
When Orrico released her debut album, Genuine (2000), she released only one mainstream single which was "Everything". It was later announced that she would record another album with her record label Forefront Records, Say It Again, which was originally intended solely for Christian pop radio, with a release date of April 2002. However, when Virgin Records saw mainstream potential with Orrico, the album was postponed and then cancelled while it was retooled. Four tracks from Say It Again were removed, although two were later released as single B-sides and Japanese bonus tracks on the album, including "Truth", "Until I Find You", "That's the Way" and " Star of My Story". Meanwhile, "Bounce Back", Say It Again's first single, was completely re-recorded and "Security" and "Maybe I Won't Look Back" received major alterations. The songs "Stuck", "(There's Gotta Be) More to Life", "I Promise", "I Could Be the One", "Instead", and "Strong Enough" were added to the track listing.

== Singles ==
The release of the album was preceded by the single "Bounce Back." When Say It Again was reworked into Stacie Orrico, the song was demoted and replaced by Dallas Austin-produced "Stuck" as the album's leading single. A worldwide success, "Stuck" reached the top five in Australia, Denmark, Germany, the Netherlands, and New Zealand and became a top ten success on most other charts it appeared on. In the United States, the song underperformed on the US Billboard 100, reaching number 52 only, though it peaked inside the top ten of the Mainstream Top 40, while the Thunderpuss Remix topped the US Hot Dance Singles Sales.

Second single "(There's Gotta Be) More to Life" became a top ten success in Ireland, New Zealand, and Norway, and reached the top 20 in Australia, Belgium, Denmark, Germany, the Netherlands, Scotland, and the United Kingdom. It also peaked at number thirty on the US Billboard Hot 100, making it Orrico's highest-charting single there. Third single "I Promise" did not do as well as her previous singles, but did make the top 20 in Ireland and the top 30 in the United Kingdom. A fourth and final single from the album, "I Could Be the One," reached number 34 on the UK Singles Chart.

== Critical reception ==
Professional ratings
Review scores
Source	Rating
AllMusic	3/5 stars
Billboard	(Positive)
Cross Rhythms	10/10 squares
Jesus Freak Hideout	4.5/5 stars
MusicOMH	(Positive)
MTV Asia	7/10
PopMatters	(Positive)
Rolling Stone	3/5 stars

Stacie Orrico received generally positive reviews from music critics. Steve Losey from AllMusic rated the album three stars out of five. He pointed out about Orrico that "vocally the opus stretches her talents by delving into several tempo and mood changes that the 17-year-old embraces like a seasoned veteran." He also said that "the astounding thing about the disc is that the grooves drip of dance floor sweat, maturity, and soulfulness while maintaining integrity and purity from America's newest diva/role model." PopMatters noted that on her second album, "Orrico knows what she can do – excellent melodic pop – and doesn't try to push any boundaries. At this time in her young career, this clear path is a benefit." While the online magazine felt that a "couple of weaker, moderate-tempo songs prevent Stacie Orrico from matching Genuine, it declared the album a "well-crafted and focused" project, complimenting it for its "solid melodies and songs."

Billboard remarked that the album had Orrico "making major inroads into mainstream pop" and called it an "adventurous set that perfectly showcases Orrico's vocal sass and youthful exuberance." Rolling Stone critic Kerry L. Smith found that the album had Orrico invoke a "sexy, sophisticated spirit [that] spices up her R&B-heavy; sophomore album with hip-hop, pop and gospel stylings well beyond her years [...] The album's shining moments are the ballads "Strong Enough," which Orrico performs on keyboard and "I Promise." If Orrico continues to stay true to herself, her career is one promise she's sure to make good on." Bill Lehane from MusicOMH gave Stacie Orrico a positive review. He found that "the urban, R&B; sound is certainly there, but this girl is singing about a much more serious mythical force than a genie in a bottle." He concluded that "this record, Orrico's second despite her tender years, is a beautiful album, and it packs a spiritual punch without alienating the average Aguilera fan. At least I hope it won't, because this contains some of the best solo female urban material in years. Does it matter that she's not singing about sex?" Cross Rhythms Tony Cummings scored the album a perfect ten-out-of-ten blocks describing it as, "a brilliant, R&B set every bit as good as those Destiny's Child albums which sell by the bushel".

== Commercial reception ==
Stacie Orrico enjoyed moderate international success. It scored its chart highest entry in Japan where it reached number three on the Japanese Albums Chart and was later certified double platinum by the Recording Industry Association of Japan (RIAJ), indicating sales in excess of the 500,000 units. The album also reached the top ten in Norway, peaking at number seven. It was eventually certified gold by the Norwegian International Federation of the Phonographic Industry (IFPI) for sales of more than 20,000 copies. Elsewhere, Stacie Orrico entered the top 20 in Austria, Germany, New Zealand, and Switzerland. The album also peaked at number 43 on the Australian Albums Chart and number 72 on the Dutch Top 40, where it spent 22 weeks on the chart.

In the United Kingdom, the album debuted at number 37 on the UK Albums Chart, but did not pass its peak of 37, and it slipped down and rose several weeks, staying in the charts for 16weeks. It eventually passed sales in excess of 100,000 copies, and was later certified silver and gold by the British Phonographic Industry (BPI). In the United States, Stacie Orrico peaked at number 59 on the US Billboard 200, and was certified gold by the Recording Industry Association of America (RIAA) for the shipment of over 500,000 copies. It also topped Billboard's Top Christian Albums, becoming Orrico's first album to do so, and finished eighth on both the chart's 2003 and 2004 year-end rankings. By January 2007, the album had sold 498,000 units, according to Nielsen SoundScan.

== Track listing ==
Stacie Orrico track listing
No.	Title	Writer(s)	Producer(s)	Length
1.	"Stuck"	Stacie Orrico; Kevin Kadish	Dallas Austin; Matt Serletic	3:41
2.	"(There's Gotta Be) More to Life"	Lucy Woodward; Orrico; Damon Thomas; Harvey Mason Jr.; Kadish; Sabelle Breer	Damon Thomas; Harvey Mason, Jr.	3:20
3.	"Bounce Back"	S7evon Daze; Marcellus Grove-Smith; Sylvia Bennett-Smith	Dent	3:01
4.	"I Promise"	Diane Warren	Thomas; Mason, Jr.	4:17
5.	"Security"	Orrico; Tedd Tjornhom; Britt Huston	Tedd T	3:17
6.	"Instead"	Orrico; Dane Deviller; Sean Hosein; Steve Smith; Anthony Anderson	Deviller; Hosein	3:24
7.	"Hesitation"	Orrico; Shannon Ford; Tedd Tjornhom; Robert "Aurel M" Marvin; Antonio Phelon	Tjornhom; Orrico^{[a]}	3:14
8.	"Strong Enough"	Orrico	Matt Rollings	3:56
9.	"I Could Be the One"	Orrico; Tedd Tjornhom; Tasia Tjornhom; Phelon	Tedd T	3:38
10.	"Maybe I Won't Look Back"	Orrico; Tedd Tjornhom	Tedd T	4:04
11.	"Tight"	Michael-Anthony Taylor	Mooki	2:29
12.	"That's What Love's About"	Orrico; Taylor	Mooki	5:16
Total length:				43:43

Japanese edition bonus track
No.	Title	Writer(s)	Producer(s)	Length
13.	"Stuck" (Thunderpuss Radio Remix)	Orrico; Kadish	Austin; Serletic; Thunderpuss^{[b]}	3:05
Total length:				46:48

Japanese deluxe edition bonus tracks
No.	Title	Writer(s)	Producer(s)	Length
13.	"Until I Find You"	Taylor; Ford; Todd Collins	Mooki	3:03
14.	"Star of My Story"	Gary Brown; Ira Schickman; Steven Wolf	Mooki	3:36
15.	"Stuck" (Thunderpuss Radio Remix)	Orrico; Kadish	Austin; Serletic; Thunderpuss^{[b]}	3:05
Total length:				53:27

Notes

- ^{^[a]} signifies a co-producer
- ^{^[b]} signifies an additional producer

== Personnel ==
- Anthony Anderson – guitar, MIDI programming
- David Angell – violin
- Dallas Austin – producer
- Ken Bell – guitar, MIDI programming
- Teddy Campbell – drums
- Melody Chambers – vocals
- Kyle Cook – guitar
- Eric Darken – percussion
- David Davidson – violin
- Eddie DeGarmo – executive producer
- Dave Deviller – producer
- Aaron Featherstone – acoustic guitar
- Greg Ham – executive producer
- Sean Hosien – producer
- Victor Indrizzo – drums
- Kenya Ivey – vocals
- Corky James – guitar, bass
- Kevin Kadish – MIDI programming
- Anthony LaMarchina – cello
- Harvey Mason Jr. – producer
- David May – Acoustic guitar
- Mooki – drums, keyboards, vocals, producer, drum programming, MIDI programming
- Marcelo Pennell – engineer, mixer
- Nashville String Machine – strings
- Lynn Nichols – guitar
- Stacie Orrico – vocals, producer
- Carlos Pennell – guitar
- Tony Reyes – guitar
- Matt Rollings – piano, producer
- Matt Serletic – producer
- Neil Stubenhaus – bass

== Charts ==
=== Weekly charts ===
Weekly chart performance for Stacie Orrico
Chart (2003)	Peak position
Australian Albums (ARIA)	43
Austrian Albums (Ö3 Austria)	15
Danish Albums (Hitlisten)	21
Dutch Albums (Album Top 100)	27
French Albums (SNEP)	145
German Albums (Offizielle Top 100)	13
Irish Albums (IRMA)	23
Japanese Albums (Oricon)	3
New Zealand Albums (RMNZ)	16
Norwegian Albums (VG-lista)	7
Swiss Albums (Schweizer Hitparade)	11
UK Albums (Official Charts)	37
US Billboard 200	59
US Christian Albums (Billboard)	1

=== Year-end charts ===
Year-end chart performance for Stacie Orrico
Chart (2003)	Position
Japanese Albums (Oricon)	34
US Christian Albums (Billboard)	8
Chart (2004)	Position
US Christian Albums (Billboard)	8

== Certifications ==
Certifications for Stacie Orrico, with pure sales where available
Region	Certification	Certified units/sales
Norway (IFPI Norway)	Gold	20,000^{*}
Japan (RIAJ)	2× Platinum	441,000 (Note: Japanese sales figures for Stacie Orrico as of August 2006)
United Kingdom (BPI)	Gold	100,000^{^}
United States (RIAA)	Gold	498,000 (Note: US sales figures for Stacie Orrico as of January 2007)
^{*} Sales figures based on certification alone.^{^} Shipments figures based on certification alone.
