= I Promise (Stacie Orrico song) =

2004 single by Stacie Orrico

Single by Stacie Orrico

from the album Stacie Orrico
- Released: January 12, 2004
- Studio: Hit Factory (New York City)
- Length: 4:17
- Label: Forefront, Virgin
- Songwriter: Diane Warren
- Producer: The Underdogs

Stacie Orrico singles chronology
"(There's Gotta Be) More to Life" (2003)	"I Promise" (2004)	"I Could Be the One" (2004)

"I Promise" is a song from Stacie Orrico's self-titled second album. The third single from the album, it was written by Diane Warren and was released only in Europe, Asia and Australia. The song did not do as well as the first two singles but gave Orrico her third top-40 hit in the United Kingdom.

== Track listings ==
UK: CD 1

1. "I Promise" (album version)
2. "I Promise" (Chris Cox radio edit)

UK: CD 2

1. "I Promise" (album version)
2. "I Promise" (Chris Cox radio edit)
3. "I Promise" (Boris & Beck radio mix)
4. "(What Are You Doing) New Year's Eve?"
5. "I Promise" (video and enhanced section)

== Charts ==
Weekly chart performance for "I Promise"
Chart (2004)	Peak position
Australia (ARIA)	48
Austria (Ö3 Austria Top 40)	59
Belgium (Ultratip Bubbling Under Flanders)	10
Belgium (Ultratip Bubbling Under Wallonia)	16
Germany (GfK)	66
Ireland (IRMA)	19
Netherlands (Single Top 100)	47
Netherlands (Tipparade)	6
UK Singles (Official Charts)	22
