= Genuine (Stacie Orrico album) =

Studio album by Stacie Orrico
- Released: August 29, 2000
- Genres: CCM; R&B; pop
- Length: 54:25
- Label: ForeFront
- Producers: Mark Heimermann; Michael W. Smith; Tedd T; Michael-Anthony Taylor

Stacie Orrico chronology
Genuine (2000)	Christmas Wish (2001)

Singles from Genuine
- 1. "Don't Look At Me" Released: 2000; 2. "Genuine" Released: August 1, 2000; 3. "Everything" Released: 2001; 4. "With A Little Faith" Released: 2001; 5. "Without Love" Released: May 2001; 6. "Stay True" Released: November 2001

Genuine is the debut studio album by American singer Stacie Orrico, released by Forefront Records on August 29, 2000. Orrico worked Mark Heimermann, Michael W. Smith, Tedd T, and Michael-Anthony Tyler on the album and co-wrote three tracks. Genuine earned generally mixed reviews and peaked at number 103 on the US Billboard 200. The album's first single, "Don't Look at Me," reached number one on the Christian hits radio (CHR) charts for eight consecutive weeks, breaking the record of any previous release on the musical chart. "Don't Look at Me" also received a nomination for two GMA Dove Awards.

== Critical reception ==
Professional ratings
Review scores
Source	Rating
AllMusic	2.5/5 stars
Billboard	(Positive)
Cross Rhythms	9/10 squares

AllMusic editor Al Campbell rated the album two and a half stars out of five. He found that Genuine "combines [Orrico's] positive Christian convictions with musical inspiration, embracing the pop/urban influence represented by Christina Aguilera and Lauryn Hill. Orrico deals with tricky lyrical issues (insecurity, peer pressure, anorexia) while musically sustaining mainstream crossover appeal." Billboard wrote that Genuine "is a muscular sound that offers lots to get listeners' attention but never obscures the charm of Orrico's voice [...] All in all, this is an impressive debut from a young artist whose talent is sure to extend beyond the current teen-act boom." Cross Rhythms Tony Cummings also responded positively, scoring Genuine nine-out-of-ten blocks noting it as "A stunning debut for anyone [...] Its the cuts with the funky R&B rhythms which give Stacie's arresting bitter-sweet voice best service".

== Chart performance ==
Genuine debuted and peaked at number 103 on the US Billboard 200, setting a record in first-week sales for a Christian female debut, selling 13,000 copies. It also reached number six on the Top Christian Albums. By March 2001, Genuine sold more than 200,000 units in its first six months of release.

== Track listing ==
Genuine track listing
No.	Title	Writer(s)	Producer(s)	Length
1.	"Ride"	Michael-Anthony Taylor	Taylor	3:04
2.	"Don't Look at Me"	Stacie Orrico; Mark Heimermann	Heimermann	3:36
3.	"0.0 Baby"	Dan Needham; Scott Faircloth; Taylor	Taylor	3:00
4.	"Without Love"	Eddie DeGarmo; Tasia Tjornhom	Tedd T	4:53
5.	"Stay True"	Heimermann; Charity	Heimermann	3:18
6.	"Kum-Ba-Ya (Interlude)"			0:09
7.	"Genuine"	Orrico; Tedd Tjornhom; Britt Huston	Tedd T	5:00
8.	"With a Little Faith"	David Wyatt; Lisa Kimmey; Michael Quinlan	Heimmerman	3:51
9.	"My Name (Interlude)"			0:28
10.	"So Pray"	Taylor	Taylor	3:58
11.	"Holdin' On"	Bob Farrell; Quinlan	Tedd T	4:31
12.	"Restore My Soul"	Ken Harrell	Tedd T	5:06
13.	"Confidant"	Heimermann; Charity	Heimermann	3:31
14.	"Everything"	Taylor	Taylor	5:23
15.	"Replay (Interlude)"			0:11
16.	"Dear Friend"	Orrico	Michael W. Smith	4:25
Total length:				54:25

== Personnel ==
Performers and musicians

- Stacie Orrico – lead vocals (1, 2, 3, 5, 8, 10, 13, 14), backing vocals (1, 3, 10, 14), all vocals (4, 7, 11, 12, 16)
- Michael-Anthony "Mooki" Taylor – keyboards (1, 3, 10, 14), drum programming (1, 3, 10, 14), voice transistor (1), backing vocals (1, 3, 10, 14)
- Mark Heimmernman – programming (2, 5, 8, 13)
- Damon Riley – programming (4, 7, 11, 12), arrangements (4, 7, 11, 12)
- Tedd T – programming (4, 7, 11, 12), arrangements (4, 7, 11, 12)
- Tim Akers – acoustic piano (14)
- Raymond Boyd – keyboards (14), drum programming (14)
- Michael W. Smith – acoustic piano (16)
- Micah Wilshire – guitars (1, 10, 14)
- George Cocchini – guitars (2, 5, 8, 13)
- Tony Palacios – guitars (3, 14), guitar solo (14)
- Lynn Nichols – guitars (4, 7, 11, 12)
- Andrew Ramsey – guitars (4, 7, 11, 12)
- Jackie Street – bass (8)
- David Davidson – violin (2)
- The Love Sponge Strings – strings (4, 7, 11, 12), string arrangements (4, 7, 11, 12)
- Jesse Shacklock – DJ cuts (4, 7, 11, 12)
- Tiffany Palmer – backing vocals (1, 2, 3, 5, 8, 10, 13, 14)

The Nashville String Machine on "Everything"

- Tim Akers – string arrangements
- Bob Mason – cello
- Carl Gorodetzky – violin
- Lee Larrison – violin
- Pamela Sixfin – violin

Production

- David Bach – executive producer
- Eddie DeGarmo – executive producer
- Raymond Boyd – co-producer for basic tracks (14)
- P.J. Heimmerman – production manager (2, 5, 8, 13)
- Dion Lopez – production manager (2, 5, 8, 13)
- Mandy Galyean – A&R administration
- Scott McDaniel – creative direction
- Susannah Parrish – art direction
- Julee Brand – design, layout
- Kristin Barlowe – photography
- Allen Clark – photography

Technical

- Ted Jensen – mastering
- Michael-Anthony Tyler – recording (1, 10), basic track recording (14)
- Robert "Void" Caprio – engineer (2, 5, 8, 13)
- Todd Robbins – engineer (2, 5, 8, 13), mixing (2, 5, 8, 13)
- Marcelo Pennell – recording (3), overdub recording (14)
- Damon Riley – recording (4, 7, 11, 12)
- Tedd T – recording (4, 7, 11, 12)
- Raymond Boyd – recording assistant (1, 10), basic track recording assistant (14)
- Bob Horn – recording assistant (3), overdub recording assistant (14), mix assistant (14)
- Alvin Speights – mixing (1, 3, 10)
- Chuck Zwicky – mixing (4, 7, 11, 12)
- J.R. McNeely – mixing (14)
- Doug Delong – mix assistant (1, 3, 10)
- Shawn Disch – mix assistant (2, 5, 8, 13)
- Trevor Johnson – mix assistant (2, 5, 8, 13)

== Charts ==
Chart performance for Genuine
Chart (2000)	Peak position
US Billboard 200	103
US Christian Albums (Billboard)	6

== Release history ==
Genuine release history
Region	Date	Format	Label	Ref(s)
United States	August 29, 2000	CD; Digital download; Streaming; Vinyl	Forefront	
