= (There's Gotta Be) More to Life =

2003 single by Stacie Orrico

Single by Stacie Orrico

from the album Stacie Orrico
- B-side: "Star of My Story"
- Released: July 14, 2003
- Studio: Hit Factory (New York City)
- Genre: Pop
- Length: 3:20
- Label: ForeFront; Virgin
- Songwriters: Sabelle Breer; Kevin Kadish; Lucy Woodward; Harvey Mason Jr.; Damon Thomas
- Producer: The Underdogs

Stacie Orrico singles chronology
"Stuck" (2003)	"(There's Gotta Be) More to Life" (2003)	"I Promise" (2004)

Music video
- "(There's Gotta Be) More to Life" on YouTube

"(There's Gotta Be) More to Life" is a song by American recording artist Stacie Orrico from her self-titled second studio album. It was released as the album's second single in the United States in July 2003. The song was written by Sabelle Breer, Kevin Kadish, Lucy Woodward, Harvey Mason Jr. and Damon Thomas, and produced by the latter two as the Underdogs.

"(There's Gotta Be) More to Life" received generally positive reviews from music critics, with one of them calling it "strong". The song was also a commercial success, peaking within the top five in New Zealand, Norway, and on the US Billboard Mainstream Top 40 chart.

== Background and lyrics ==
"(There's Gotta Be) More to Life" conveys a message about a person wanting more from their life. Stacie Orrico sings about feelings of emptiness and dissatisfaction that can come from constantly chasing temporary highs. In the first verse, Orrico sings about having it all, but still feeling deprived. She tries to understand what she's missing, singing: "Tell me what is this thing that I feel like I'm missing / And why can't I let go".

Writing for musicOMH, Bill Lehane observed that the track is "concerned with troubles of faith and gradually introduce [listeners] to the idea that this is, in fact, a record of deeply religious music."

== Reception ==
Jon Singer of PopMatters called the song a "strong" single.

In 2014, English singer Sam Smith mentioned in an interview that "(There's Gotta Be) More to Life" is their favorite music video of all time.

== Chart performance ==
"(There's Gotta Be) More to Life" peaked at number 30 on the US Billboard Hot 100, becoming Orrico's biggest single to date in the country. The song also peaked at number 5 on the US Billboard Pop Songs, and number 31 on the US Billboard Adult Top 40.

The song also received worldwide success. The song debuted at number 32 on the Australian singles chart, and after eight weeks in the charts, it peaked at number 11. It stayed in the charts for 19 weeks, and was certified Gold, selling over 35,000 copies in the country. The song debuted at number 48 on the New Zealand Singles Chart. After two weeks, the song jumped from number 38 to number 9, and after two weeks in the top 10, dropped to number 12; however, the next week, it re-entered the top 10, and after five weeks ascending the top 10, it reached its peak of number 3. It then stayed another two weeks in the top 10 before slowly dropping down the chart, staying 18 weeks total on the New Zealand chart. Half of those 18 weeks were spent in the top 10, and the song was certified Gold, selling over 7,500 copies there. The song also peaked at number 2 for four weeks in Norway and stayed on the country's chart for 16 weeks.

== Music video ==
The video is directed by Dave Meyers. Throughout the video, Orrico portrays a number of women with different yet hectic lives: a poor mother in debt, a member of a busking band, a long-distance marathon runner, a supermodel, a diner waitress, a businesswoman, a gang member, and a high-level thief. The video ends with Orrico portrayed as a regular girl in a crowd, before finally disappearing as a passerby walks by.

In June 2003, Orrico described the music video to MTV: "The video plays off the specific lyrics of the song. I'm playing ... everything from a successful businesswoman to a diner waitress to a supermodel, then I'm this athlete who's trying to be the biggest and the best and the strongest –just all these different characters where I'm looking in the wrong places. It's a really interesting video. We had a lot of fun shooting it. There's a lot of very extreme clothes, hair and makeup changes. I think so many times we feel like we're lacking something in our lives and we try to fill it with the wrong things. Sometimes it's drugs, sometimes it's a relationship you shouldn't be in."

== Track listings ==
US maxi-CD single

1. "(There's Gotta Be) More to Life" (album version) – 3:21
2. "(There's Gotta Be) More to Life" (JN radio edit) – 3:10
3. "(There's Gotta Be) More to Life" (Global Soul radio edit) – 3:10
4. "(There's Gotta Be) More to Life" (Goodandevil/Ruff Ryders remix) – 3:15
5. "(There's Gotta Be) More to Life" (Briss remix) – 3:23
6. "(There's Gotta Be) More to Life" (Dr. Octavo extended mix) – 4:47
7. "(There's Gotta Be) More to Life" (Jason Nevins Club Creation) – 7:12

US DVD single

1. "(There's Gotta Be) More to Life" (video)
2. "(There's Gotta Be) More to Life" (Goodandevil/Ruff Ryders remix audio)
3. "Stuck" (video)
4. "Stuck" (Barry Harris & Chris Cox remix audio)
5. Behind the scenes
6. Photo gallery

Australian CD single

1. "(There's Gotta Be) More to Life" – 3:20
2. "Stuck" (Barry Harris & Chris Cox remix) – 3:05
3. "Star of My Story" – 3:35
4. "Until I Find You" – 3:01
5. "Stuck" (video) – 3:42

UK CD1 and European CD single

1. "(There's Gotta Be) More to Life" – 3:20
2. "Star of My Story" – 3:35

UK CD2

1. "(There's Gotta Be) More to Life" – 3:20
2. "(There's Gotta Be) More to Life" (Dr. Octavo extended mix) – 4:47
3. "Star of My Story" – 3:35
4. "(There's Gotta Be) More to Life" (video) – 3:19

UK 12-inch single

A1. "(There's Gotta Be) More to Life" – 3:20
A2. "(There's Gotta Be) More to Life" (Dr. Octavo extended mix) – 4:47
B1. "(There's Gotta Be) More to Life" (Global Soul radio edit) – 6:24
B2. "(There's Gotta Be) More to Life" (Jason Nevins remix) – 4:48

Japanese CD single

1. "(There's Gotta Be) More to Life"
2. "I Promise"
3. "(There's Gotta Be) More to Life" (Dr. Octavo radio mix)
4. "(There's Gotta Be) More to Life" (instrumental)

== Charts ==
=== Weekly charts ===
Chart (2003–2004)	Peak position
Australia (ARIA)	11
Austria (Ö3 Austria Top 40)	23
Belgium (Ultratop 50 Flanders)	36
Belgium (Ultratip Bubbling Under Wallonia)	11
CIS Airplay (TopHit)	66
Denmark (Tracklisten)	12
Europe (Eurochart Hot 100)	19
Germany (GfK)	12
Ireland (IRMA)	9
Netherlands (Dutch Top 40)	16
Netherlands (Single Top 100)	19
New Zealand (Recorded Music NZ)	3
Norway (VG-lista)	2
Russia Airplay (TopHit)	46
Scotland Singles (OCC)	9
Sweden (Sverigetopplistan)	45
Switzerland (Schweizer Hitparade)	22
UK Singles (OCC)	12
Ukraine Airplay (TopHit)	46
US Billboard Hot 100	30
US Adult Top 40 (Billboard)	31
US Dance Singles Sales (Billboard)	2
US Hot Christian Singles & Tracks (Billboard)	5
US Mainstream Top 40 (Billboard)	5

=== Year-end charts ===
Chart (2003)	Position
Australia (ARIA)	67
CIS Airplay (TopHit)	124
Ireland (IRMA)	78
New Zealand (RIANZ)	32
Russia Airplay (TopHit)	88
UK Singles (OCC)	178
Ukraine Airplay (TopHit)	70
US Dance Singles Sales (Billboard)	13
US Mainstream Top 40 (Billboard)	57

Chart (2004)	Position
US Dance Singles Sales (Billboard)	5
US Hot Christian Singles & Tracks (Billboard)	12
US Mainstream Top 40 (Billboard)	72

== Certifications ==
Region	Certification	Certified units/sales
Australia (ARIA)	Gold	35,000^{^}
New Zealand (RMNZ)	Gold	5,000^{*}
^{*} Sales figures based on certification alone.^{^} Shipments figures based on certification alone.

== Release history ==
Region	Date	Format(s)	Label(s)	Ref.
United States	July 14, 2003	Contemporary hit radio	ForeFront; Virgin	
Australia	August 4, 2003	CD	ForeFront; Virgin	
United States	August 18, 2003	Hot adult contemporary radio	ForeFront; Virgin	
United Kingdom	October 20, 2003	12-inch vinyl; CD	ForeFront; Virgin	
Japan	November 12, 2003	CD	Virgin	
