= Stacie Orrico =

American singer-songwriter (born 1986)

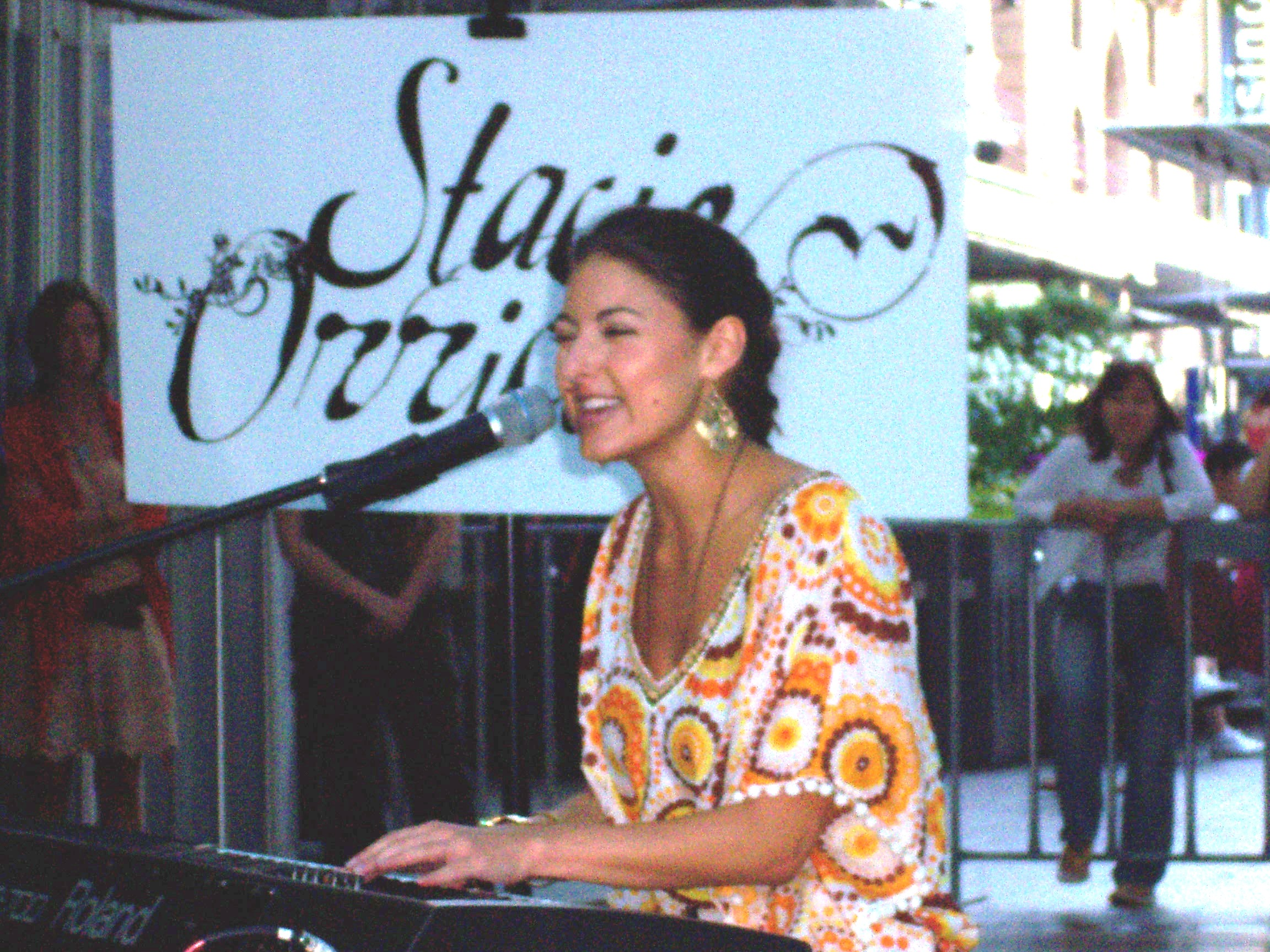
- Orrico performing in the Queen Street Mall in Brisbane, Australia in 2006

Background information
- Born: Stacie Joy Orrico; March 3, 1986 (age 40); Seattle, Washington, U.S.
- Genres: Pop; CCM; R&B
- Occupations: Singer, songwriter
- Years active: 1999–present
- Labels: ForeFront, Virgin

Stacie Joy Orrico (born March 3, 1986) is an American singer and songwriter. After signing to ForeFront Records, Orrico recorded her first album, Genuine (2000). Her second album Stacie Orrico (2003), released by ForeFront and Virgin, debuted at No. 59 on the Billboard 200, and was certified gold with over 500,000 sales in the United States. The first single "Stuck" reached No. 52 on Billboard Hot 100, and achieved greater success worldwide. Her second single "(There's Gotta Be) More to Life" peaked at No. 30 on the Billboard Hot 100.

Her self-titled album has achieved sales worldwide of over 3.5 million. In 2003, she made her first television appearance as an actress in two episodes of American Dreams. Her third album, Beautiful Awakening (2006) spawned two singles, "I'm Not Missing You" and "So Simple".

== Early life ==
Orrico was born in Seattle, Washington, to Patti (née Schmautz) and Dean Orrico, who were missionaries. She is of one-quarter Italian descent, born to a close-knit family. The family later moved to Denver, Colorado, where Orrico took piano lessons from Cathy Paquette. Orrico is the middle child of five: her siblings are Jesse, Rachel, Alicia, and Joshua. She was a missionary with her family and lived in Ukraine for several years.

Orrico grew up influenced by a wide range of musical styles and was a member in the church choir; she often accompanied on the piano as the family sang Christian hymns. At age six, Orrico wrote her first song, entitled "Always Answer". She also attended missionary school with singer Allen Stone.

== Career ==
=== 1999–2001: Early work and debut album ===
Orrico got her start at the age of 13, by attending a Christian music festival, Praise in the Rockies, held in her then-home state of Colorado. Orrico inadvertently entered a high-stakes talent competition, and won. A ForeFront Records executive was on hand and approached her for a record deal. She later signed with them. In 2001, she toured with Destiny's Child as their opening act on select dates of their Survivor tour in the United States.

She went on to release two albums. The first was Genuine (2000), which she recorded at age 14. It sold over 13,000 copies in the first week, the highest debut-week sales ever for a female Christian artist. The album produced the hit single "Don't Look At Me", which topped Christian charts for ten consecutive weeks. The album had two No. 1 hits, as well as three more top-ten singles. Genuine eventually sold 500,000 copies, giving the album a Gold certification on word of mouth alone.

In 2001, 15-year-old Orrico released her only Christmas album, Christmas Wish. The six tracks on the EP were: "Christmas Wish", "Love Came Down", "O Holy Night", "What Child is This", "O Come All Ye Faithful", and "White Christmas".

=== 2002–2004: International success with Stacie Orrico ===
Her next effort, the more mainstream self-titled album Stacie Orrico, was released in 2003 and charted on the US Billboard 200 (debuting at No. 67), Australian ARIA Albums Chart and the UK Albums Chart. The first mainstream single from this album was "Stuck", which became a worldwide hit, reaching the Top 5 on the majority of the world's charts. This was followed by the single "(There's Gotta Be) More to Life", which peaked in the top 20 in Australia (No. 11) and the UK (No. 12), although, overall, "Stuck" charted better, the exception being in the US. In 2014, English singer Sam Smith mentioned in an interview that "(There's Gotta Be) More to Life" is their favorite music video.

In December 2003, Orrico performed Christmas music such as "The Christmas Song" on NBC's news and talk show Today. She also performed "Stuck" on UK and Italy's Total Request Live. In 2003, she portrayed Peggy Santiglia of the girl group the Angels in an episode of NBC's drama television series American Dreams. In the show, she performed the Angels' song "My Boyfriend's Back," which was included on the show's soundtrack.

This was then followed by "I Promise", written by Diane Warren (top 30 in the UK), and the final mainstream single "I Could Be the One" (top 40 in the UK in June 2004). Both singles were given limited releases and limited promotion, meaning they did not fare as well as the first two singles. The last three singles were only released to Christian radio in addition to "Strong Enough", which reached No. 1 as the CD's very first single. Stacie Orrico sold over 500,000 copies in the US, enough sales for a Gold certification. The album also sold 600,000 in Japan and an estimated 3.4 million copies worldwide. In 2004, Orrico's songs "(There's Gotta Be) More to Life" and "Stuck" appeared on the Barbie Hit Mix.

She was nominated at the 46th Annual Grammy Awards in the category Best Pop/Contemporary Gospel Album, but the award was given to Michael W. Smith.

In March 2004, she took a break for a couple of years.

=== 2005–2007: Beautiful Awakening ===
She was dropped by her label ForeFront Records in 2005 after seven years. After her break, she decided to work on her new album, called Beautiful Awakening, which was set to be released worldwide on August 29, 2006; however, for reasons unknown, the release of the album was postponed in the US. In an interview, she said that the album was one of the best albums she has worked on and was a personal album; the songs are about her life and more. Though almost all of the songs from the new album leaked onto the internet, Beautiful Awakening was still released in Japan, the UK, and other countries. The album features production from Dallas Austin, Dwayne Bastiany, KayGee, and the Underdogs, and writing duties are performed by notable songwriters like She'kspere, Track & Field, Anthony Dent, Nate Butler and newcomer Novel and Orrico herself. The album sold 100,000 copies in Japan.

The first single, "I'm Not Missing You", went for radio adds on June 20, 2006, but due to little promotion was re-released in October. The song peaked at No. 19 on the Bubbling Under Hot 100 Singles chart. The second single from the album, "So Simple", was released in Asia in October 2006 and was released in Europe on January 27, 2007. "Beautiful Awakening" is available to purchase on iTunes.

In 2007, the belated release of Beautiful Awakening was postponed once again. In March, Orrico announced that Virgin Records was merging with Capitol Records and she had left them and would not be releasing the album with that label. Her record company terminated her contract and her tour dates were canceled. On her Myspace it was announced that she would spend time in Africa.

=== 2008–2011: Hiatus ===
After a long break from the public eye, Orrico headlined the QB Goes Live concert on March 15, 2008, in Cambodia, performing to an audience of over 50,000 at the Phnom Penh Olympic Stadium. Orrico also appeared at Singfest Festival in Singapore. She also held a short Japan tour in July 2008 in Tokyo, Osaka and Fukuoka. Orrico collaborated with producer and songwriter Toby Gad and Onree Gill in 2008.

In 2009, she was back in the studio with Brandon Beal and Cannon Mapp to record her fourth album. One of the tracks she recorded was "Light Years". Later the song did not make the album and was re-recorded by Albanian-American artist Kristine Elezaj in 2010.

In 2010, she co-wrote a song with Novel for American Idol winner and R&B singer Fantasia Barrino called "I Can't Be Without You" for her third album Back to Me. The song did not make the final album.

=== 2012–present: Comeback, "The Return" concert ===
In 2012, she featured on the Fray's third album Scars and Stories on the track "Ready or Not", which is a cover of the Fugees song. The song is only available on the deluxe edition bonus disc of the album. She independently released a new song called "Catch Me If You Can" on April 2, 2012. "Catch Me If You Can" is composed and performed by Orrico and the Gabe Cummins Orchestra, which has a jazzy sound. A release date for a new album was never confirmed.

Orrico posted a video on her YouTube account in 2013 to explain her hiatus and announce plans to return to the studio. Orrico revealed she had been studying women's literature and acting at New York University from 2011 to 2013. She announced that she was working on an R&B album that she hoped would be finished in 2014. She worked with several collaborators, including producers Allen Stone, Hal Linton, Gabe Cummins and the Lions.

To celebrate her comeback, she performed a virtual concert on November 6, 2013, via Stageit.com.

On November 9, 2015, Orrico performed with the house band at the time, Jon Batiste and Stay Human on The Late Show with Stephen Colbert.

== Influences ==
When asked about her influences, she responded: "All of my influences are very soulful musicians – my favorite artist is Lauryn Hill, and I've always loved Whitney Houston, Mariah Carey and Ella Fitzgerald – and I wanted to explore that direction more." She said when she was young, she listened to Alicia Keys, Monica and Destiny's Child. Her other musical influences include Christina Aguilera, Billie Holiday, Sarah Vaughan and Toni Braxton.

== Personal life ==
In March 2007, Orrico traveled to South Africa as a volunteer with Cross-Cultural Solutions to help children with HIV/AIDS.

After several years of dating, Orrico married actor Isaiah Johnson in July 2016. As of 2022, Orrico and Johnson have a son and a daughter.

Orrico was one of the founders of the Nile Project, "a modern day artist’s salon" focused on providing women "a place for collaborative, feminine ways of healing and creating."

In January 2026, Orrico filed a lawsuit against her former manager Britt Ham along with Universal Music Group, ForeFront Records and others, for alleged sexual battery, childhood sexual abuse, negligence, and gender violence.

== Discography ==
- Genuine (2000)
- Stacie Orrico (2003)
- Beautiful Awakening (2006)

== Filmography ==
Television
| Year | Title | Role | Notes | Performance |
|---|---|---|---|---|
| 2003 | American Dreams | The Angels' Singer | Episode "City on Fire" | Performed "My Boyfriend's Back" with Brittany Snow and Vanessa Lengies |
| 2003 | American Dreams | Peggy Santiglia | Episode "Life's Illusions" | |
| 2003 | Today | Herself / Performer | Episode dated December 22, 2003 | Performed "The Christmas Song" |
| 2003 | Macy's Thanksgiving Day Parade | Herself / Performer | Television special | Performed "(There's Gotta Be) More to Life" |
| 2003 | TRL Italy | Herself / Performer | Episode: "Episode #5.1" | Performed "Stuck" |
| 2004 | Total Request Live | Herself / Performer | Episode: "Episode dated 21 January 2004" | Performed "Stuck" |
