= Stuck (Stacie Orrico song) =

2003 single by Stacie Orrico

Single by Stacie Orrico

from the album Stacie Orrico
- B-side: "Bounce Back"; "Until I Find You"
- Released: February 3, 2003
- Studio: O'Henry (Burbank, California); Hit Factory (New York City)
- Genre: Pop
- Length: 3:49
- Label: Forefront; Virgin
- Songwriters: Stacie Orrico; Kevin Kadish
- Producers: Dallas Austin; Matt Serletic

Stacie Orrico singles chronology
"Everything" (2001)	"Stuck" (2003)	"(There's Gotta Be) More to Life" (2003)

"Stuck" is a song by American singer-songwriter Stacie Orrico, released in the United States on February 3, 2003, as the lead single from her self-titled second album.

== Background and release ==
"Stuck" was co-written by Stacie Orrico and Kevin Kadish. According to Orrico, the track was inspired by conversations between her and Kadish about the emotional experiences of teenage girls in unhealthy romantic relationships. Her inspiration for the song was drawn from the idea that many young girls find themselves in relationships where they do not feel well treated while, on the other hand, dealing with the fear of losing that relationship and ending up lonely, and the "emotional roller coaster" this conveys.

== Chart performance ==
Despite underperforming on the US Billboard Hot 100, where it peaked at No. 52, "Stuck" was an international chart success, reaching No. 3 in Australia, the Netherlands, and New Zealand. It additionally peaked at No. 9 in the United Kingdom and became a top-10 hit in several other European countries.

== Music video ==
Filmed in early 2003 and directed by Diane Martel, the song "Stuck"'s music video shows Stacie Orrico's on-and-off relationship with her boyfriend during high school.

The video begins with Orrico's alarm clock waking her up and after she turns it off, she looks at a framed picture of her and her boyfriend (played by her cousin, actor Trevor Wright), frowns at it and turns it over, letting it drop behind the nightstand as she puts her head back on her pillow. She gets out of her bed, walks to her mirror which is covered with pictures of her boyfriend, and then writes the word "stuck" in red lipstick on the mirror. She then gets on a school bus and sits in her seat, clearly in a bad mood. Noticing that her boyfriend is on the bus driving by, waving and blowing kisses to her, Orrico slides down her seat, using a notebook to block her view of him. Later, she stands in front of a chain-link fence and watches him play basketball with his friends. Another scene shows Orrico getting ready for a school dance, but when she arrives, she sees her boyfriend dancing with another girl and then leaves, just as her boyfriend notices her. When she gets off the bus at the end of the video, she quickly walks over to her boyfriend. Just as they approach each other, she walks away from him.

== Track listings ==
US CD single

1. "Stuck" (album version) – 3:42
2. "Stuck" (rhythmic mix) – 3:45
3. "Stuck" (Thunderpuss radio version) – 3:05
4. "More to Life" (sneak peek) – 0:57
5. "I Promise" (sneak peek) – 0:58
6. "Stuck" (video) – 3:42

Canadian, Australasian, and European CD single

1. "Stuck" – 3:42
2. "Bounce Back" – 3:01

UK CD single

1. "Stuck" – 3:42
2. "Stuck" (Barry Harris & Chris Cox club remix) – 8:25
3. "Until I Find You" – 3:01
4. "Stuck" (video) – 3:42

UK 12-inch single

A. "Stuck" (Barry Harris & Chris Cox club remix) – 8:25
B. "Stuck" (Barry Harris & Chris Cox dub) – 10:05

== Charts ==
=== Weekly charts ===
Chart (2003)	Peak position
Australia (ARIA)	3
Austria (Ö3 Austria Top 40)	8
Belgium (Ultratop 50 Flanders)	9
Belgium (Ultratop 50 Wallonia)	12
Denmark (Tracklisten)	4
European Hot 100 Singles (Billboard)	16
France (SNEP)	36
Germany (GfK)	4
Hungary (Rádiós Top 40)	29
Ireland (IRMA)	6
Netherlands (Dutch Top 40)	3
Netherlands (Single Top 100)	4
New Zealand (Recorded Music NZ)	3
Norway (VG-lista)	9
Romania (Romanian Top 100)	29
Scottish Singles Sales (Official Charts)	8
Sweden (Sverigetopplistan)	9
Switzerland (Schweizer Hitparade)	6
UK Singles (Official Charts)	9
US Billboard Hot 100	52
US Dance Singles Sales (Billboard) Thunderpuss remix	1
US Mainstream Top 40	10

=== Year-end charts ===
Chart (2003)	Position
Australia (ARIA)	27
Austria (Ö3 Austria Top 40)	55
Belgium (Ultratop 50 Flanders)	53
Belgium (Ultratop 50 Wallonia)	74
Germany (Media Control GfK)	27
Ireland (IRMA)	80
Netherlands (Dutch Top 40)	24
Netherlands (Single Top 100)	39
New Zealand (RIANZ)	12
Sweden (Hitlistan)	62
Switzerland (Schweizer Hitparade)	23
UK Singles (OCC)	156
US Dance Singles Sales (Billboard)	6
US Mainstream Top 40 (Billboard)	49

== Certifications ==
Region	Certification	Certified units/sales
Australia (ARIA)	Platinum	70,000^{^}
Germany (BVMI)	Gold	150,000^{‡}
New Zealand (RMNZ)	Gold	5,000^{*}
^{*} Sales figures based on certification alone.^{^} Shipments figures based on certification alone.^{‡} Sales+streaming figures based on certification alone.

== Release history ==
Region	Date	Format(s)	Label(s)	Ref.
United States	February 3, 2003	Contemporary hit radio	Forefront; Virgin	
Australia	March 24, 2003	CD	Forefront; Virgin	
United Kingdom	August 11, 2003	CD	Forefront; Virgin	
