= List of number-one digital tracks of 2006 (Australia) =

ARIA Charts number-one digital tracks of 2006 2007 >

Other Australian number-one charts of 2006
- albums
- singles
- dance singles

Top Australian singles and albums of 2006
- Triple J Hottest 100
- top 25 singles
- top 25 albums

The ARIA Digital Track Chart ranks the best-performing digital tracks of Australia. It is published by Australian Recording Industry Association (ARIA), an organisation who collects music data for the weekly ARIA Charts. To be eligible to appear on the chart, the recording must be a single not an EP and only paid downloads counted from downloadable outlets. The First issue counted was week ending 10 April.

== Chart history ==
Issue date	Song	Artist(s)	Reference
10 April	"Forever Young"	Youth Group	
17 April	"Forever Young"	Youth Group	
24 April	"Forever Young"	Youth Group	
1 May	"SOS"	Rihanna	
8 May	"SOS"	Rihanna	
15 May	"SOS"	Rihanna	
22 May	"Forever Young"	Youth Group	
29 May	"Forever Young"	Youth Group	
5 June	"SOS"	Rihanna	
12 June	"SOS"	Rihanna	
19 June	"Black Fingernails, Red Wine"	Eskimo Joe	
26 June	"Black Fingernails, Red Wine"	Eskimo Joe	
3 July	"Black Fingernails, Red Wine"	Eskimo Joe	
10 July	"Hips Don't Lie"	Shakira featuring Wyclef Jean	
17 July	"Hips Don't Lie"	Shakira featuring Wyclef Jean	
24 July	"Hips Don't Lie"	Shakira featuring Wyclef Jean	
31 July	"Hips Don't Lie"	Shakira featuring Wyclef Jean	
7 August	"Hips Don't Lie"	Shakira featuring Wyclef Jean	
14 August	"Hips Don't Lie"	Shakira featuring Wyclef Jean	
21 August	"SexyBack"	Justin Timberlake	
28 August	"SexyBack"	Justin Timberlake	
4 September	"SexyBack"	Justin Timberlake	
11 September	"I Wish I Was a Punk Rocker (With Flowers in My Hair)"	Sandi Thom	
18 September	"SexyBack"	Justin Timberlake	
25 September	"I Wish I Was a Punk Rocker (With Flowers in My Hair)"	Sandi Thom	
2 October	"I Wish I Was a Punk Rocker (With Flowers in My Hair)"	Sandi Thom	
9 October	"I Don't Feel Like Dancin'"	Scissor Sisters	
16 October	"I Don't Feel Like Dancin'"	Scissor Sisters	
23 October	"I Don't Feel Like Dancin'"	Scissor Sisters	
30 October	"I Don't Feel Like Dancin'"	Scissor Sisters	
6 November	"Chasing Cars"	Snow Patrol	
13 November	"Chasing Cars"	Snow Patrol	
20 November	"Chasing Cars"	Snow Patrol	
27 November	"Chasing Cars"	Snow Patrol	
4 December	"Chasing Cars"	Snow Patrol	
11 December	"Night of My Life"	Damien Leith	
18 December	"Chasing Cars"	Snow Patrol	
25 December	"Chasing Cars"	Snow Patrol	

== Number-one artists ==
Position	Artist	Weeks at No. 1
1	Snow Patrol	7
2	Shakira	6
2	Wyclef Jean	6
3	Rihanna	5
3	Youth Group	5
4	Justin Timberlake	4
4	Scissor Sisters	4
5	Eskimo Joe	3
5	Sandi Thom	3
6	Damien Leith	1

== See also ==
- List of number-one singles of 2006 (Australia)
