= List of number-one urban singles of 2006 (Australia) =

ARIA Charts number-one urban singles of 2006 2007 >

Other Australian number-one charts of 2006
- albums
- singles
- dance singles

Top Australian singles and albums of 2006
- Triple J Hottest 100
- top 25 singles
- top 25 albums

The ARIA Urban Chart is a chart that ranks the best-performing Urban tracks singles of Australia. It is published by Australian Recording Industry Association (ARIA), an organisation who collect music data for the weekly ARIA Charts. To be eligible to appear on the chart, the recording must be a single, and be "predominantly of a Urban nature".

== Chart history ==
Issue date	Song	Artist(s)	Reference
2 January	"My Humps"	The Black Eyed Peas	
9 January	"Stickwitu"	The Pussycat Dolls	
16 January	"Stickwitu"	The Pussycat Dolls	
23 January	"Run It!"	Chris Brown	
30 January	"When I'm Gone"	Eminem	
6 February	"Run It!"	Chris Brown	
13 February	"Run It!"	Chris Brown	
20 February	"Run It!"	Chris Brown	
27 February	"Run It!"	Chris Brown	
6 March	"Run It!"	Chris Brown	
13 March	"Run It!"	Chris Brown	
20 March	"Run It!"	Chris Brown	
27 March	"Pump It"	The Black Eyed Peas	
3 April	"Beep"	The Pussycat Dolls featuring Will.i.am	
10 April	"Beep"	The Pussycat Dolls featuring Will.i.am	
17 April	"Beep"	The Pussycat Dolls featuring Will.i.am	
24 April	"SOS"	Rihanna	
1 May	"SOS"	Rihanna	
8 May	"SOS"	Rihanna	
15 May	"SOS"	Rihanna	
22 May	"SOS"	Rihanna	
29 May	"SOS"	Rihanna	
5 June	"SOS"	Rihanna	
12 June	"SOS"	Rihanna	
19 June	"SOS"	Rihanna	
26 June	"SOS"	Rihanna	
3 July	"Promiscuous"	Nelly Furtado featuring Timbaland	
10 July	"Promiscuous"	Nelly Furtado featuring Timbaland	
17 July	"Promiscuous"	Nelly Furtado featuring Timbaland	
24 July	"Unfaithful"	Rihanna	
31 July	"Buttons"	The Pussycat Dolls featuring Snoop Dogg	
7 August	"Buttons"	The Pussycat Dolls featuring Snoop Dogg	
14 August	"Unfaithful"	Rihanna	
21 August	"Promiscuous"	Nelly Furtado featuring Timbaland	
28 August	"Buttons"	The Pussycat Dolls featuring Snoop Dogg	
4 September	"Unfaithful"	Rihanna	
11 September	"Buttons"	The Pussycat Dolls featuring Snoop Dogg	
18 September	"London Bridge"	Fergie	
25 September	"London Bridge"	Fergie	
2 October	"London Bridge"	Fergie	
9 October	"London Bridge"	Fergie	
16 October	"Maneater"	Nelly Furtado	
23 October	"Maneater"	Nelly Furtado	
30 October	"Maneater"	Nelly Furtado	
6 November	"Maneater"	Nelly Furtado	
13 November	"Smack That"	Akon featuring Eminem	
20 November	"My Love"	Justin Timberlake	
27 November	"Smack That"	Akon featuring Eminem	
4 December	"Smack That"	Akon featuring Eminem	
11 December	"Smack That"	Akon featuring Eminem	
18 December	"Smack That"	Akon featuring Eminem	
25 December	"Smack That"	Akon featuring Eminem	

== Number-one artists ==
Position	Artist	Weeks at No. 1
1	Rihanna	13
2	The Pussycat Dolls	9
3	Chris Brown	8
3	Nelly Furtado	8
4	Eminem	7
5	Akon	6
6	Fergie	4
6	Snoop Dogg	4
6	Timbaland	4
7	Will.i.am	3
8	The Black Eyed Peas	2
9	Justin Timberlake	1

== See also ==
- 2006 in music
- List of number-one singles of 2006 (Australia)
