= List of number-one urban albums of 2007 (Australia) =

ARIA Charts number-one urban albums of 2007 < 2006 2008 >

Other Australian number-one charts of 2007
- albums
- singles
- dance singles
- club tracks

Top Australian singles and albums of 2007
- Triple J Hottest 100
- top 25 singles
- top 25 albums

This is a list of albums that reached number-one on the ARIA Urban Albums Chart in 2007. The ARIA Urban Albums Chart is a weekly chart that ranks the best-performing urban albums in Australia. It is published by the Australian Recording Industry Association (ARIA), an organisation that collects music data for the weekly ARIA Charts. To be eligible to appear on the chart, the recording must be an album of a predominantly urban nature.

== Chart history ==
Issue date	Album	Artist(s)	Reference
1 January	The Sweet Escape	Gwen Stefani	
8 January	FutureSex/LoveSounds	Justin Timberlake	
15 January	FutureSex/LoveSounds	Justin Timberlake	
22 January	FutureSex/LoveSounds	Justin Timberlake	
29 January	FutureSex/LoveSounds	Justin Timberlake	
5 February	Loose	Nelly Furtado	
12 February	Loose	Nelly Furtado	
19 February	Loose	Nelly Furtado	
26 February	FutureSex/LoveSounds	Justin Timberlake	
5 March	FutureSex/LoveSounds	Justin Timberlake	
12 March	FutureSex/LoveSounds	Justin Timberlake	
19 March	The Sweet Escape	Gwen Stefani	
26 March	The Sweet Escape	Gwen Stefani	
2 April	The Sweet Escape	Gwen Stefani	
9 April	The Sweet Escape	Gwen Stefani	
16 April	The Sweet Escape	Gwen Stefani	
23 April	Loose	Nelly Furtado	
30 April	Loose	Nelly Furtado	
7 May	Loose	Nelly Furtado	
14 May	The Sweet Escape	Gwen Stefani	
21 May	The Hard Road: Restrung	Hilltop Hoods	
28 May	The Hard Road: Restrung	Hilltop Hoods	
4 June	FutureSex/LoveSounds	Justin Timberlake	
11 June	FutureSex/LoveSounds	Justin Timberlake	
18 June	Good Girl Gone Bad	Rihanna	
25 June	Good Girl Gone Bad	Rihanna	
2 July	Good Girl Gone Bad	Rihanna	
9 July	The Dutchess	Fergie	
16 July	The Dutchess	Fergie	
23 July	The Dutchess	Fergie	
30 July	The Dutchess	Fergie	
6 August	The Dutchess	Fergie	
13 August	The Dutchess	Fergie	
20 August	The Dutchess	Fergie	
27 August	The Dutchess	Fergie	
3 September	The Dutchess	Fergie	
10 September	The Dutchess	Fergie	
17 September	Curtis	50 Cent	
24 September	Graduation	Kanye West	
1 October	Graduation	Kanye West	
8 October	The Dutchess	Fergie	
15 October	The Dutchess	Fergie	
22 October	FutureSex/LoveSounds	Justin Timberlake	
29 October	FutureSex/LoveSounds	Justin Timberlake	
5 November	FutureSex/LoveSounds	Justin Timberlake	
12 November	FutureSex/LoveSounds	Justin Timberlake	
19 November	Shock Value	Timbaland	
26 November	Shock Value	Timbaland	
3 December	Shock Value	Timbaland	
10 December	Shock Value	Timbaland	
17 December	Shock Value	Timbaland	
24 December	Shock Value	Timbaland	
31 December	Shock Value	Timbaland	

== See also ==
- 2007 in music
- List of number-one albums of 2007 (Australia)
