= List of number-one club tracks of 2006 (Australia) =

ARIA Charts number-one club tracks of 2006 2007 >

Other Australian number-one charts of 2006
- albums
- singles
- dance singles

Top Australian singles and albums of 2006
- Triple J Hottest 100
- top 25 singles
- top 25 albums

This is a list of ARIA club chart number-one hits from 2006, which is collected from Australian Recording Industry Association (ARIA) from weekly DJ reports.

== Chart ==
Date		Song	Artist(s)	Reference
January	16	"Never Say Never"	Vandalism	
January	23	"Never Say Never"	Vandalism	
January	30	"Never Say Never"	Vandalism	
February	6	"Muscle Car"	Mylo	
February	13	"Muscle Car"	Mylo	
February	20	"Muscle Car"	Mylo	
February	27	"Never Say Never"	Vandalism	
March	6	"Speechless"	Mish Mash	
March	13	"Speechless"	Mish Mash	
March	20	"It's Too Late"	Evermore vs. Dirty South	
March	27	"It's Too Late"	Evermore vs. Dirty South	
April	3	"It's Too Late"	Evermore vs. Dirty South	
April	10	"It's Too Late"	Evermore vs. Dirty South	
April	17	"It's Too Late"	Evermore vs. Dirty South	
April	24	"It's Too Late"	Evermore vs. Dirty South	
May	1	"It's Too Late"	Evermore vs. Dirty South	
May	8	"World, Hold On (Children of the Sky)"	Bob Sinclar	
May	15	"World, Hold On (Children of the Sky)"	Bob Sinclar	
May	22	"World, Hold On (Children of the Sky)"	Bob Sinclar	
May	29	"World, Hold On (Children of the Sky)"	Bob Sinclar	
June	5	"Be Together"	T-Funk	
June	12	"Be Together"	T-Funk	
June	19	"Be Together"	T-Funk	
June	26	"My Love"	Kortezman	
July	3	"All This Love"	The Similou	
July	10	"All This Love"	The Similou	
July	17	"All This Love"	The Similou	
July	24	"All This Love"	The Similou	
July	31	"All This Love"	The Similou	
August	7	"Put Your Hands Up 4 Detroit"	Fedde le Grand	
August	14	"Put Your Hands Up 4 Detroit"	Fedde le Grand	
August	21	"Put Your Hands Up 4 Detroit"	Fedde le Grand	
August	28	"Put Your Hands Up 4 Detroit"	Fedde le Grand	
September	4	"Put Your Hands Up 4 Detroit"	Fedde le Grand	
September	11	"Put Your Hands Up 4 Detroit"	Fedde le Grand	
September	18	"Put Your Hands Up 4 Detroit"	Fedde le Grand	
September	25	"Put Your Hands Up 4 Detroit"	Fedde le Grand	
October	2	"Put Your Hands Up 4 Detroit"	Fedde le Grand	
October	9	"Put Your Hands Up 4 Detroit"	Fedde le Grand	
October	16	"Put Your Hands Up 4 Detroit"	Fedde le Grand	
October	23	"He doesn't love you"	Sarah McLeod	
October	30	"Pictures"	Sneaky Sound System	
November	6	"Pictures"	Sneaky Sound System	
November	13	"Pictures"	Sneaky Sound System	
November	20	"Pictures"	Sneaky Sound System	
November	27	"Pictures"	Sneaky Sound System	
December	4	"Pictures"	Sneaky Sound System	
December	11	"Pictures"	Sneaky Sound System	
December	18	"Pictures"	Sneaky Sound System	
December	25	"Pictures"	Sneaky Sound System	

== Number-one artists ==
Position	Artist	Weeks at No. 1
1	Fedde Le Grande	11
2	Sneaky Sound System	9
3	Evermore	7
3	Dirty South	7
4	The Similou	5
5	Bob Sinclar	4
5	Vandalism	4
6	Mylo	3
6	T-Funk	3
7	Mish Mash	2
8	Kortezman	1
8	Sarah McLeod	1

== See also ==
- ARIA Charts
- List of number-one singles of 2006 (Australia)
- List of number-one albums of 2006 (Australia)
- 2006 in music
