= List of number-one country albums of 2007 (Australia) =

ARIA Charts number-one country albums of 2007 < 2006 2008 >

Other Australian number-one charts of 2007
- albums
- singles
- dance singles
- club tracks

Top Australian singles and albums of 2007
- Triple J Hottest 100
- top 25 singles
- top 25 albums

These are the Australian Country number-one albums of 2007, per the ARIA Charts.

Issue date	Album	Artist
1 January	Love, Pain & the Whole Crazy Thing	Keith Urban
8 January	Taking the Long Way	Dixie Chicks
15 January	Taking the Long Way	Dixie Chicks
22 January	Be Here	Keith Urban
29 January	The Winners 2007	Various Artists
5 February	The Winners 2007	Various Artists
12 February	The Winners 2007	Various Artists
19 February	The Winners 2007	Various Artists
26 February	Taking the Long Way	Dixie Chicks
5 March	Taking the Long Way	Dixie Chicks
12 March	Taking the Long Way	Dixie Chicks
19 March	Taking the Long Way	Dixie Chicks
26 March	Taking the Long Way	Dixie Chicks
2 April	Love, Pain & the Whole Crazy Thing	Keith Urban
9 April	Pubs, Trucks and Plains	Slim Dusty
16 April	Pubs, Trucks and Plains	Slim Dusty
23 April	Pubs, Trucks and Plains	Slim Dusty
30 April	Pubs, Trucks and Plains	Slim Dusty
7 May	Pubs, Trucks and Plains	Slim Dusty
14 May	Taking The Long Way	Dixie Chicks
21 May	Taking The Long Way	Dixie Chicks
28 May	Love, Pain & the Whole Crazy Thing	Keith Urban
4 June	Taking The Long Way	Dixie Chicks
11 June	Taking The Long Way	Dixie Chicks
18 June	Lost Highway	Bon Jovi
25 June	Lost Highway	Bon Jovi
2 July	Lost Highway	Bon Jovi
9 July	Lost Highway	Bon Jovi
16 July	Lost Highway	Bon Jovi
23 July	Spirit of the Bush	Lee Kernaghan
30 July	Spirit of the Bush	Lee Kernaghan
6 August	Spirit of the Bush	Lee Kernaghan
13 August	Spirit of the Bush	Lee Kernaghan
20 August	Spirit of the Bush	Lee Kernaghan
27 August	Spirit of the Bush	Lee Kernaghan
3 September	Spirit of the Bush	Lee Kernaghan
10 September	Spirit of the Bush	Lee Kernaghan
17 September	Spirit of the Bush	Lee Kernaghan
24 September	Kill to Get Crimson	Mark Knopfler
1 October	I'm Doing Alright	Adam Harvey
8 October	Revival	John Fogerty
15 October	Revival	John Fogerty
22 October	Revival	John Fogerty
29 October	Cowboy Town	Brooks & Dunn
5 November	Long Road Out of Eden	Eagles
12 November	Long Road Out of Eden	Eagles
19 November	Long Road Out of Eden	Eagles
26 November	Long Road Out of Eden	Eagles
3 December	Long Road Out of Eden	Eagles
10 December	Long Road Out of Eden	Eagles
17 December	Long Road Out of Eden	Eagles
24 December	Long Road Out of Eden	Eagles
31 December	Long Road Out of Eden	Eagles

== See also ==
- 2007 in music
- List of number-one albums of 2007 (Australia)
