= List of number-one digital tracks of 2007 (Australia) =

ARIA Charts number-one digital tracks of 2007 2008 >

Other Australian number-one charts of 2007
- albums
- singles
- dance singles
- club tracks

Top Australian singles and albums of 2007
- Triple J Hottest 100
- top 25 singles
- top 25 albums

The ARIA Digital Track Chart ranks the best-performing digital tracks of Australia. It is published by Australian Recording Industry Association (ARIA), an organisation who collects music data for the weekly ARIA Charts. To be eligible to appear on the chart, the recording must be a single not an EP and only paid downloads counted from downloadable outlets.

== Chart history ==
Issue date	Song	Artist(s)	Reference
1 January	"Chasing Cars"	Snow Patrol	
8 January	"Chasing Cars"	Snow Patrol	
15 January	"Chasing Cars"	Snow Patrol	
22 January	"Light Surrounding You"	Evermore	
29 January	"Lips of an Angel"	Hinder	
5 February	"Lips of an Angel"	Hinder	
12 February	"Lips of an Angel"	Hinder	
19 February	"How to Save a Life"	The Fray	
26 February	"How to Save a Life"	The Fray	
5 March	"Straight Lines"	Silverchair	
12 March	"Straight Lines"	Silverchair	
19 March	"Straight Lines"	Silverchair	
26 March	"Straight Lines"	Silverchair	
2 April	"Straight Lines"	Silverchair	
9 April	"Straight Lines"	Silverchair	
16 April	"Grace Kelly"	Mika	
23 April	"Grace Kelly"	Mika	
30 April	"Grace Kelly"	Mika	
7 May	"Grace Kelly"	Mika	
14 May	"Girlfriend"	Avril Lavigne	
21 May	"Girlfriend"	Avril Lavigne	
28 May	"Glamorous"	Fergie	
4 June	"Umbrella"	Rihanna featuring Jay-Z	
11 June	"Umbrella"	Rihanna featuring Jay-Z	
18 June	"Umbrella"	Rihanna featuring Jay-Z	
25 June	"Umbrella"	Rihanna featuring Jay-Z	
2 July	"Big Girls Don't Cry"	Fergie	
9 July	"Big Girls Don't Cry"	Fergie	
16 July	"Big Girls Don't Cry"	Fergie	
23 July	"Big Girls Don't Cry"	Fergie	
30 July	"Big Girls Don't Cry"	Fergie	
6 August	"Big Girls Don't Cry"	Fergie	
13 August	"Big Girls Don't Cry"	Fergie	
20 August	"Big Girls Don't Cry"	Fergie	
27 August	"Big Girls Don't Cry"	Fergie	
3 September	"Stronger"	Kanye West	
10 September	"Big Girls Don't Cry"	Fergie	
17 September	"Thnks fr th Mmrs"	Fall Out Boy	
24 September	"Stronger"	Kanye West	
1 October	"Beautiful Girls"	Sean Kingston	
8 October	"Beautiful Girls"	Sean Kingston	
15 October	"The Way I Are"	Timbaland featuring Keri Hilson & D.O.E	
22 October	"Hey There Delilah"	The Plain White T's	
29 October	"Hey There Delilah"	The Plain White T's	
5 November	"The Way I Are"	Timbaland featuring Keri Hilson & D.O.E	
12 November	"Hook Me Up"	The Veronicas	
19 November	"Apologize"	Timbaland featuring OneRepublic	
26 November	"Apologize"	Timbaland featuring OneRepublic	
3 December	"Apologize"	Timbaland featuring OneRepublic	
10 December	"Apologize"	Timbaland featuring OneRepublic	
17 December	"Apologize"	Timbaland featuring OneRepublic	
24 December	"Apologize"	Timbaland featuring OneRepublic	
31 December	"Apologize"	Timbaland featuring OneRepublic	

== Number-one artists ==
Position	Artist	Weeks at No. 1
1	Fergie	11
2	Timbaland	9
3	OneRepublic	7
4	Silverchair	6
5	Mika	4
5	Rihanna	4
5	Jay-Z	4
6	Hinder	3
6	Snow Patrol	3
7	Avril Lavigne	2
7	The Fray	2
7	Kanye West	2
7	Sean Kingston	2
7	Keri Hilson	2
7	D.O.E	2
7	The Plain White T's	2
8	Evermore	1
8	Fall Out Boy	1
8	The Veronicas	1

== See also ==
- List of number-one singles of 2007 (Australia)
