= List of number-one country albums of 2006 (Australia) =

ARIA Charts number-one country albums of 2006 < 2005 2007 >

Other Australian number-one charts of 2006
- albums
- singles
- dance singles

Top Australian singles and albums of 2006
- Triple J Hottest 100
- top 25 singles
- top 25 albums

These are the Australian Country number-one albums of 2006, per the ARIA Charts.

| Issue date | Album | Artist |
|---|---|---|
| 2 January | Be Here | Keith Urban |
| 9 January | Be Here | Keith Urban |
| 16 January | Be Here | Keith Urban |
| 23 January | Cream of Country Volume 9 | Various Artists |
| 30 January | The Winners 2006 | Various Artists |
| 6 February | The Winners 2006 | Various Artists |
| 13 February | Walk the Line | Various Artists |
| 20 February | Walk the Line | Various Artists |
| 27 February | Walk the Line | Various Artists |
| 6 March | Walk the Line | Various Artists |
| 13 March | Walk the Line | Various Artists |
| 20 March | Walk the Line | Various Artists |
| 27 March | Walk the Line | Various Artists |
| 3 April | Walk the Line | Various Artists |
| 10 April | Walk the Line | Various Artists |
| 17 April | Walk the Line | Various Artists |
| 24 April | Walk the Line | Various Artists |
| 1 May | Walk the Line | Various Artists |
| 8 May | The New Bush | Lee Kernaghan |
| 15 May | The New Bush | Lee Kernaghan |
| 22 May | The New Bush | Lee Kernaghan |
| 29 May | Taking the Long Way | Dixie Chicks |
| 5 June | Taking the Long Way | Dixie Chicks |
| 12 June | Taking the Long Way | Dixie Chicks |
| 19 June | Taking the Long Way | Dixie Chicks |
| 26 June | Taking the Long Way | Dixie Chicks |
| 3 July | Taking the Long Way | Dixie Chicks |
| 10 July | Taking the Long Way | Dixie Chicks |
| 17 July | Taking the Long Way | Dixie Chicks |
| 24 July | Taking the Long Way | Dixie Chicks |
| 31 July | Taking the Long Way | Dixie Chicks |
| 7 August | Taking the Long Way | Dixie Chicks |
| 14 August | Taking the Long Way | Dixie Chicks |
| 21 August | Taking the Long Way | Dixie Chicks |
| 28 August | Taking the Long Way | Dixie Chicks |
| 4 September | Taking the Long Way | Dixie Chicks |
| 11 September | Taking the Long Way | Dixie Chicks |
| 18 September | Taking the Long Way | Dixie Chicks |
| 25 September | Taking the Long Way | Dixie Chicks |
| 2 October | Taking the Long Way | Dixie Chicks |
| 9 October | Taking the Long Way | Dixie Chicks |
| 16 October | Taking the Long Way | Dixie Chicks |
| 23 October | Taking the Long Way | Dixie Chicks |
| 30 October | Taking the Long Way | Dixie Chicks |
| 6 November | Taking the Long Way | Dixie Chicks |
| 13 November | Love, Pain & the Whole Crazy Thing | Keith Urban |
| 20 November | Love, Pain & the Whole Crazy Thing | Keith Urban |
| 27 November | Love, Pain & the Whole Crazy Thing | Keith Urban |
| 4 December | Love, Pain & the Whole Crazy Thing | Keith Urban |
| 11 December | Love, Pain & the Whole Crazy Thing | Keith Urban |
| 18 December | Love, Pain & the Whole Crazy Thing | Keith Urban |
| 25 December | Love, Pain & the Whole Crazy Thing | Keith Urban |

== See also ==
- 2006 in music
- List of number-one albums of 2006 (Australia)
