= List of number-one urban albums of 2006 (Australia) =

ARIA Charts number-one urban albums of 2006 < 2005 2007 >

Other Australian number-one charts of 2006
- albums
- singles
- dance singles

Top Australian singles and albums of 2006
- Triple J Hottest 100
- top 25 singles
- top 25 albums

This is a list of albums that reached number-one on the ARIA Urban Albums Chart in 2006. The ARIA Urban Albums Chart is a weekly chart that ranks the best-performing urban albums in Australia. It is published by the Australian Recording Industry Association (ARIA), an organisation that collects music data for the weekly ARIA Charts. To be eligible to appear on the chart, the recording must be an album of a predominantly urban nature.

== Chart history ==
| Issue date | Album | Artist(s) | Reference |
|---|---|---|---|
| 2 January | Curtain Call: The Hits | Eminem | |
| 9 January | Curtain Call: The Hits | Eminem | |
| 16 January | Curtain Call: The Hits | Eminem | |
| 23 January | Curtain Call: The Hits | Eminem | |
| 30 January | Curtain Call: The Hits | Eminem | |
| 6 February | Blazin' 5 | Various Artists | |
| 13 February | Blazin' 5 | Various Artists | |
| 20 February | Blazin' 5 | Various Artists | |
| 27 February | Blazin' 5 | Various Artists | |
| 6 March | Monkey Business | The Black Eyed Peas | |
| 13 March | Monkey Business | The Black Eyed Peas | |
| 20 March | Monkey Business | The Black Eyed Peas | |
| 27 March | Monkey Business | The Black Eyed Peas | |
| 3 April | Late Registration | Kanye West | |
| 10 April | The Hard Road | Hilltop Hoods | |
| 17 April | The Hard Road | Hilltop Hoods | |
| 24 April | The Hard Road | Hilltop Hoods | |
| 1 May | The Hard Road | Hilltop Hoods | |
| 8 May | The Hard Road | Hilltop Hoods | |
| 15 May | Monkey Business | The Black Eyed Peas | |
| 22 May | The Breakthrough | Mary J. Blige | |
| 29 May | Monkey Business | The Black Eyed Peas | |
| 5 June | Peeping Tom | Peeping Tom | |
| 12 June | R&B Gold | Various Artists | |
| 19 June | R&B Gold | Various Artists | |
| 26 June | R&B Gold | Various Artists | |
| 3 July | R&B Gold | Various Artists | |
| 10 July | Monkey Business | The Black Eyed Peas | |
| 17 July | Loose | Nelly Furtado | |
| 24 July | Loose | Nelly Furtado | |
| 31 July | Loose | Nelly Furtado | |
| 7 August | Alright, Still | Lily Allen | |
| 14 August | Loose | Nelly Furtado | |
| 21 August | Loose | Nelly Furtado | |
| 28 August | Loose | Nelly Furtado | |
| 4 September | Loose | Nelly Furtado | |
| 11 September | B'Day | Beyoncé | |
| 18 September | Loose | Nelly Furtado | |
| 25 September | Loose | Nelly Furtado | |
| 2 October | Loose | Nelly Furtado | |
| 9 October | Loose | Nelly Furtado | |
| 16 October | PCD | The Pussycat Dolls | |
| 23 October | PCD | The Pussycat Dolls | |
| 30 October | PCD | The Pussycat Dolls | |
| 6 November | PCD | The Pussycat Dolls | |
| 13 November | PCD | The Pussycat Dolls | |
| 20 November | PCD | The Pussycat Dolls | |
| 27 November | PCD | The Pussycat Dolls | |
| 4 December | FutureSex/LoveSounds | Justin Timberlake | |
| 11 December | The Sweet Escape | Gwen Stefani | |
| 18 December | The Sweet Escape | Gwen Stefani | |
| 25 December | The Sweet Escape | Gwen Stefani | |

== See also ==
- 2006 in music
- List of number-one albums of 2006 (Australia)
