= List of number-one urban singles of 2007 (Australia) =

ARIA Charts number-one urban singles of 2007 2008 >

Other Australian number-one charts of 2007
- albums
- singles
- dance singles
- club tracks

Top Australian singles and albums of 2007
- Triple J Hottest 100
- top 25 singles
- top 25 albums

The ARIA Urban Chart is a chart that ranks the best-performing Urban tracks singles of Australia. It is published by Australian Recording Industry Association (ARIA), an organisation who collect music data for the weekly ARIA Charts. To be eligible to appear on the chart, the recording must be a single, and be "predominantly of a Urban nature".

== Chart history ==
Issue date	Song	Artist(s)	Reference
1 January	"Smack That"	Akon featuring Eminem	
8 January	"Smack That"	Akon featuring Eminem	
15 January	"Smack That"	Akon featuring Eminem	
22 January	"Smack That"	Akon featuring Eminem	
29 January	"Smack That"	Akon featuring Eminem	
5 February	"Smack That"	Akon featuring Eminem	
12 February	"Smack That"	Akon featuring Eminem	
19 February	"Smack That"	Akon featuring Eminem	
26 February	"The Sweet Escape"	Gwen Stefani featuring Akon	
5 March	"The Sweet Escape"	Gwen Stefani featuring Akon	
12 March	"The Sweet Escape"	Gwen Stefani featuring Akon	
19 March	"The Sweet Escape"	Gwen Stefani featuring Akon	
26 March	"The Sweet Escape"	Gwen Stefani featuring Akon	
2 April	"The Sweet Escape"	Gwen Stefani featuring Akon	
9 April	"The Sweet Escape"	Gwen Stefani featuring Akon	
16 April	"The Sweet Escape"	Gwen Stefani featuring Akon	
23 April	"Beautiful Liar"	Beyoncé featuring Shakira	
30 April	"Beautiful Liar"	Beyoncé featuring Shakira	
7 May	"Glamorous"	Fergie Featuring Ludacris	
14 May	"Glamorous"	Fergie Featuring Ludacris	
21 May	"Glamorous"	Fergie Featuring Ludacris	
28 May	"Glamorous"	Fergie Featuring Ludacris	
4 June	"Umbrella"	Rihanna Featuring Jay-Z	
11 June	"Umbrella"	Rihanna Featuring Jay-Z	
18 June	"Umbrella"	Rihanna Featuring Jay-Z	
25 June	"Umbrella"	Rihanna Featuring Jay-Z	
2 July	"Umbrella"	Rihanna Featuring Jay-Z	
9 July	"Umbrella"	Rihanna Featuring Jay-Z	
16 July	"Big Girls Don't Cry"	Fergie	
23 July	"Big Girls Don't Cry"	Fergie	
30 July	"Big Girls Don't Cry"	Fergie	
6 August	"Big Girls Don't Cry"	Fergie	
13 August	"Big Girls Don't Cry"	Fergie	
20 August	"Big Girls Don't Cry"	Fergie	
27 August	"Big Girls Don't Cry"	Fergie	
3 September	"Big Girls Don't Cry"	Fergie	
10 September	"Big Girls Don't Cry"	Fergie	
17 September	"Beautiful Girls"	Sean Kingston	
24 September	"Beautiful Girls"	Sean Kingston	
1 October	"Beautiful Girls"	Sean Kingston	
8 October	"Beautiful Girls"	Sean Kingston	
15 October	"Beautiful Girls"	Sean Kingston	
22 October	"Beautiful Girls"	Sean Kingston	
29 October	"The Way I Are"	Timbaland featuring Keri Hilson & D.O.E	
5 November	"The Way I Are"	Timbaland featuring Keri Hilson & D.O.E	
12 November	"The Way I Are"	Timbaland featuring Keri Hilson & D.O.E	
19 November	"The Way I Are"	Timbaland featuring Keri Hilson & D.O.E	
26 November	"Apologize"	Timbaland featuring OneRepublic	
3 December	"Apologize"	Timbaland featuring OneRepublic	
10 December	"Apologize"	Timbaland featuring OneRepublic	
17 December	"Apologize"	Timbaland featuring OneRepublic	
24 December	"Apologize"	Timbaland featuring OneRepublic	
31 December	"Apologize"	Timbaland featuring OneRepublic	

== Number-one artists ==
Position	Artist	Weeks at No. 1
1	Akon	16
2	Fergie	13
3	Timbaland	10
4	Eminem	8
4	Gwen Stefani	8
5	Rihanna	6
5	Jay-Z	6
5	Sean Kingston	6
6	Ludacris	4
6	Keri Hilson	4
6	D.O.E	4
7	Beyoncé	2

== See also ==
- 2007 in music
- List of number-one singles of 2007 (Australia)
