= ARIA Club Chart =

Ranking of club music tracks from Australia

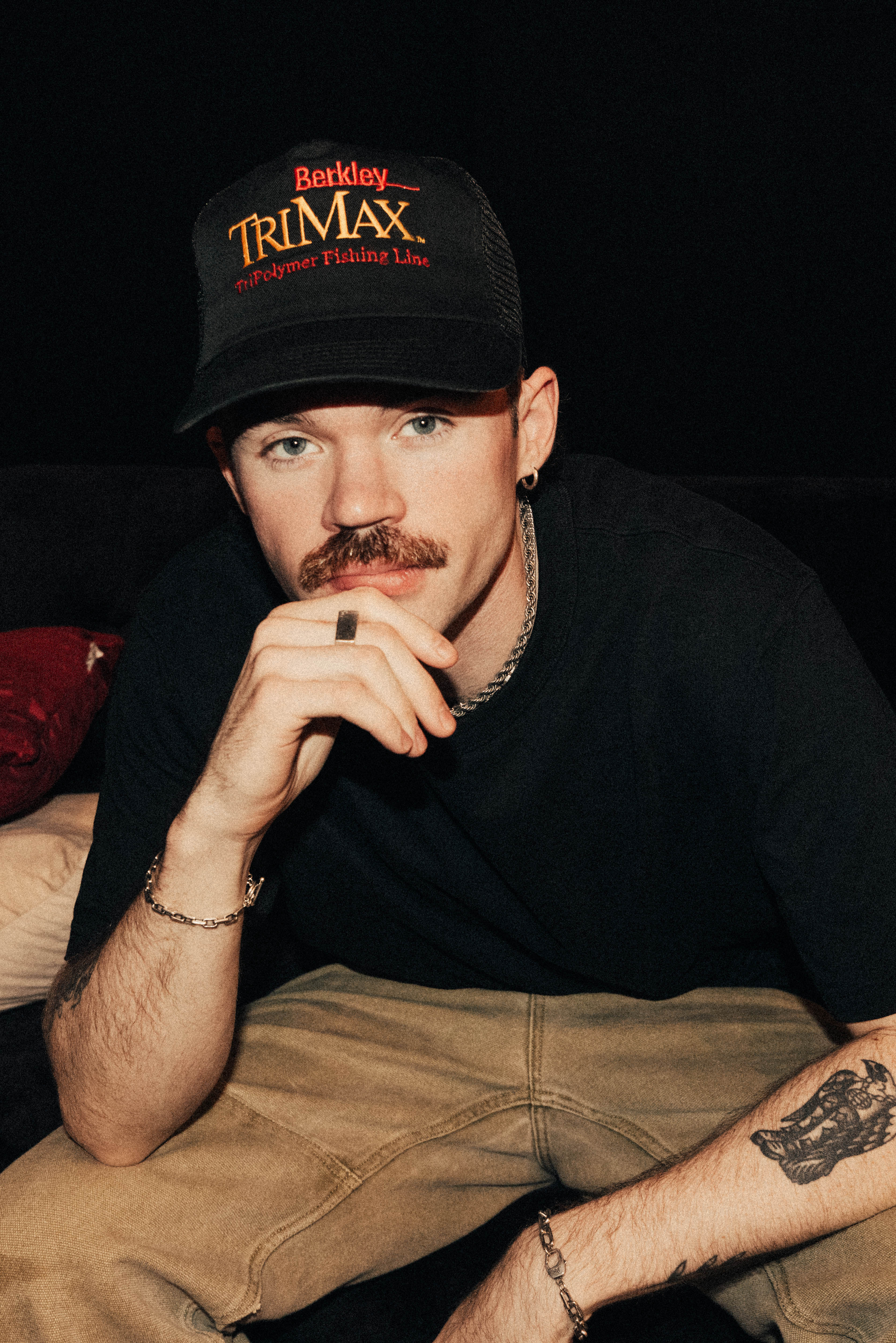
Dom Dolla holds the record for the most number ones on the chart and also has the most weeks at number one and also by one track

The ARIA Club Chart ranks the best performing club music tracks within Australia and is provided by the Australian Recording Industry Association.

== History ==
The Club Chart was established in 1999 and first published on 26 July. The First number one was "9 PM (Till I Come)" by ATB however Aria report only starts at January 2001. The chart still runs weekly as of 20 November 2026 The chart still runs weekly as of 20 November 2026 The current number one is "Danger Danger" by Dom Dolla, Solomun and Skepta.

== Trivia ==
=== Songs with the most weeks at number one ===
17 weeks

- Dom Dolla – "Saving Up" (2023–2024)

14 weeks

- Swedish House Mafia – "Don't You Worry Child" (2012)
- Dean Turnley – "Actin Tough" (2026)

13 weeks

- iiO – "Rapture" (2001–2002)

12 weeks

- Sneaky Sound System – "Pictures" (2006–2007)
- MK and Dom Dolla – "Rhyme Dust" (2023)

11 weeks

- Fedde Le Grand – "Put Your Hands Up 4 Detroit" (2006)
- Ivan Gough and Feenixpawl featuring Georgi Kay – "In My Mind" (2012)

10 weeks

- Samim – "Heater" (2007)
- Sidney Samson – "Riverside" (2009)
- Tonite Only – "We Run the Nite" (2011)
- Pnau – "Go Bang" (2018)

=== Artists with the most number ones ===
This list includes main artists and featured artists.

- Dom Dolla (12)
- Jolyon Petch (11)
- Colour Castle (8)
- Calvin Harris (8)
- Sgt Slick (8)
- Fisher (8)
- Yolanda Be Cool (6)
- Martin Solveig (5)
- TV Rock (5)
- Andy Murphy (4)
- Peking Duk (4)

=== Cumulative weeks at number one ===
- Dom Dolla (62)
- Fisher (37)
- Calvin Harris (35)
- Colour Castle (33)
- Armand van Helden (31)
- Jolyon Petch (31)
- Martin Solveig (30)
- Pnau (30)
- Sgt Slick (28)
- TV Rock (27)

== See also ==
- ARIA Charts
