= Jay Haze =

American recording artist (died 2025)

Jay Haze (died 2025) was an American recording artist. Originally from Philadelphia, he had moved to Berlin by 2006. He recorded under the monikers The Architect, Subversions, The Hoffman Ensemble, Bearback and Fuckpony.

In the early 2000s, Jay Haze co-founded the record labels TuningSpork, Contexterrior and the now defunct Textone.org (which released minimal music under a Creative Commons license) with Björn Hartmann. Jay Haze was a frequent collaborator of Ricardo Villalobos and Samim. He died in 2025.
