= The Similou =

Swedish music duo

- Origin: Gothenburg, Sweden
- Genres: Electronic
- Years active: 2004
- Labels: Dealers of Nordic Music
- Members: Joel Eriksson; Erik Niklasson

The Similou were an electronic music duo from Gothenburg, Sweden, comprising Dizzy Crane (Joel Eriksson) and Jesse Nectar (Erik Niklasson).

== Discography ==
=== Albums ===
List of albums, with selected details
Title	Details
So Hot Right Now	Released: 30 March 2005; Format: CD; Label: Dealers of Nordic Music (DNMCD008)

=== Singles ===
List of singles, with selected chart positions
Title	Year	Chart positions			Album
Title	Year	SWE	AUS	UK	Album
"All This Love"	2004	58	37	20	So Hot Right Now
"Ladykillers"	2005	—	—	—	So Hot Right Now
"Play with Us"	2005	—	—	—	So Hot Right Now

== Internet meme ==
"All This Love" is the base of an Internet meme, particularly on the website YTMND. On 16 July 2006, YTMND user Salta created a site called "Rainbow Stalin;" which comes from a misinterpretation of the words "rainbow stylin'" in The Similou's song to be about Joseph Stalin. This site featured an edited Soviet propaganda picture to which Salta added a rainbow and gave Stalin cartoon-like eyes. Many of the sites have Soviet propaganda art edited with flashing colors and accessories such as sunglasses, headphones, and turntables to portray Stalin as a jubilant DJ. While the meme comes from YTMND, references can be found on other websites such as YouTube.
