= List of number-one club tracks of 2007 (Australia) =

ARIA Charts number-one club tracks of 2007 2008 >

Other Australian number-one charts of 2007
- albums
- singles
- dance singles

Top Australian singles and albums of 2007
- Triple J Hottest 100
- top 25 singles
- top 25 albums

This is a list of ARIA Club Chart number-one hits from 2007, which is collected from Australian Recording Industry Association (ARIA) from weekly DJ reports.

== Chart ==
Date		Song	Artist(s)	Reference
January	15	"Pictures"	Sneaky Sound System	
January	22	"Pictures"	Sneaky Sound System	
January	29	"Pictures"	Sneaky Sound System	
February	5	"Proper Education"	Eric Prydz vs. Pink Floyd	
February	12	"The Others"	TV Rock vs. Dukes of Windsor	
February	19	"The Others"	TV Rock vs. Dukes of Windsor	
February	26	"The Others"	TV Rock vs. Dukes of Windsor	
March	5	"The Others"	TV Rock vs. Dukes of Windsor	
March	12	"The Others"	TV Rock vs. Dukes of Windsor	
March	19	"The Others"	TV Rock vs. Dukes of Windsor	
March	26	"The Others"	TV Rock vs. Dukes of Windsor	
April	2	"The Others"	TV Rock vs. Dukes of Windsor	
April	9	"Get Down"	Groove Armada	
April	16	"Get Down"	Groove Armada	
April	23	"Get Down"	Groove Armada	
April	30	"Get Down"	Groove Armada	
May	7	"Get Down"	Groove Armada	
May	14	"Get Down"	Groove Armada	
May	21	"Get Down"	Groove Armada	
May	28	"Get Down"	Groove Armada	
June	4	"NYC Beat"	Armand van Helden	
June	11	"NYC Beat"	Armand van Helden	
June	18	"NYC Beat"	Armand van Helden	
June	25	"NYC Beat"	Armand van Helden	
July	2	"NYC Beat"	Armand van Helden	
July	9	"NYC Beat"	Armand van Helden	
July	16	"Automatic Machine"	Sgt Slick & Pitch Dark	
July	23	"Automatic Machine"	Sgt Slick & Pitch Dark	
July	30	"Automatic Machine"	Sgt Slick & Pitch Dark	
August	6	"Automatic Machine"	Sgt Slick & Pitch Dark	
August	13	"Shake & Pop"	Green Velvet	
August	20	"I Want Your Soul"	Armand van Helden	
August	27	"I Want Your Soul"	Armand van Helden	
September	3	"I Want Your Soul"	Armand van Helden	
September	10	"I Want Your Soul"	Armand van Helden	
September	17	"I Want Your Soul"	Armand van Helden	
September	24	"Don't Hold Back"	The Potbelleez	
October	1	"Don't Hold Back"	The Potbelleez	
October	8	"Heater"	Samim	
October	15	"Heater"	Samim	
October	22	"Heater"	Samim	
October	29	"Heater"	Samim	
November	5	"Heater"	Samim	
November	12	"Heater"	Samim	
November	19	"Heater"	Samim	
November	26	"Thou Shalt Always Kill"	Dan Le Sac Vs. Scroobius Pip	
December	3	"Heater"	Samim	
December	10	"Heater"	Samim	
December	17	"Heater"	Samim	
December	24	"I Want You"	Mark James	
December	31	"I Want You"	Mark James	

== Number-one artists ==
Position	Artist	Weeks at No. 1
1	Armand van Helden	11
2	Samim	10
3	TV Rock	8
3	Groove Armada	8
4	Sgt Slick	4
5	Sneaky Sound System	3
6	Mark James	2
6	The Potbelleez	2
7	Eric Prydz	1
7	Green Velvet	1
7	Dan Le Sac Vs. Scroobius Pip	1

== See also ==
- ARIA Charts
- List of number-one singles of 2007 (Australia)
- List of number-one albums of 2007 (Australia)
- 2007 in music
