= Heater (instrumental) =

2007 instrumental by Samim

Single by Samim

from the album Flow
- Released: 29 October 2007
- Genre: House
- Length: 3:04
- Label: Get Physical Music; Data; Spinnin'
- Songwriter: Samim Winiger
- Producer: Samim Winiger

Samim singles chronology
"Heater" (2007)	"The Lick" (2008)

"Heater" is an instrumental song by Swiss electronic music producer Samim. The instrumental contains a sample of the Colombian cumbia "La Cumbia Cienaguera", popular in the 1950s, in a version by Colombian accordionist Alberto Pacheco.

"Heater" peaked within the top ten of the charts in Belgium and the Netherlands as well as the top twenty of the UK Singles Chart. This song was featured on the various artists compilation Ultra 2008. It also appears as the intro track on the first CD of the Hed Kandi The Mix 2008 3-CD collection called The Mix 2008 CD1 − Twisted Disco Mix.

== Music video ==
A music video was produced and released in support of the single. The video opens with a piece of luggage in the carousel of an airport, then cuts to a montage of city landscapes and air travel clips which seem to follow the suitcase around the world to various environments. The video cuts to a random assortment of people wearing headphones and dancing around the world in various environments – Asian metropolises, Southeast Asia marketplaces, New York City, the Great Pyramids of Giza, a Buddhist statue, the beaches in the islands of Caribbean, San Francisco's Golden Gate Bridge and more – to the beat of the song. The variety of people and clothing styles suggests unity and happiness as a central part of dancing to the infectious melody of the accordion sample used in "Heater".

Roughly 30 seconds into the video, the luggage reappears and opens to reveal the accordion. Interspersed with the dancing people individuals play the accordion in relation to the sample. Some scenes also depict the dancers mouthing the words of the short vocal yells or mimicking the style of vocalization characterized to the Native American tribes in the United States.

In the later half of the video an individual which may actually be Samim wearing a floral printed rabbit onesie, large boots and oversized sunglasses dances in front of a painted desert landscape. Between two shots of this individual is an airline steward dancing in the aisle of an airplane with no passengers. The video concludes with a man dancing in the shallows of the shoreline of a beach before lifting off the headphones during sunset.

== Charts ==
=== Weekly charts ===
Chart (2007–2008)	Peak position
Austria (Ö3 Austria Top 40)	60
Belgium (Ultratop 50 Flanders)	6
Belgium (Ultratip Bubbling Under Wallonia)	4
Finland (Suomen virallinen lista)	13
France (SNEP)	31
Germany (GfK)	47
Hungary (Dance Top 40)	1
Hungary (Single Top 40)	4
Italy (FIMI)	14
Netherlands (Dutch Top 40)	6
Netherlands (Single Top 100)	4
UK Singles (Official Charts)	12

=== Year-end charts ===
Chart (2007)	Position
Belgium (Ultratop 50 Flanders)	58
Hungary (Dance Top 40)	29
Netherlands (Dutch Top 40)	44
Netherlands (Single Top 100)	37

Chart (2008)	Position
Hungary (Dance Top 40)	24

== Samplings ==
In 2008, the song was sampled in Shaggy's title song for the UEFA Championship 2008 called "Feel the Rush". In 2016, Italian producer Alex Guesta used the sample from "Heater" on his track "Cumbia Cienaguera", released on Spinnin' Records. In 2019, British producer D.O.D released "According To Me" on Axtone Records using the same sample as "Heater".
