= Samim =

Swiss producer of electronic dance music

Samim (full name Samim Winiger) is a Swiss producer of electronic dance music.

== Biography ==
Winiger is of Iranian descent. With Michal Ho, he released several tracks under the name Samim & Michal. He has also worked with Jay Haze as Bearback and Fuckpony.

In 2004, Samim temporarily stopped his work after he developed cancer. However, shortly after he brought out several 12-inch singles. His breakthrough in Europe was in the summer of 2007, with the eccentric accordion-techno track "Heater" which became a summer hit and was included on the Ministry of Sound 2008 compilation The Rush. The single was released in the Netherlands on 27 September 2007 and reached number 6 in the Dutch top 40. It also reached number 12 in the UK Singles Chart.

In September 2007, his first solo-album, Flow, also appeared. A second album, Kook Kook, was released in 2009.

== Discography ==
=== Albums ===
- Flow (2007), Get Physical

=== Singles ===
- Eternally Collapsing Object EP (2006), Moon Harbour
- "Do You See the Light?" (2007), Circus Company
- "Heater" (2007), Get Physical
