= List of top 25 singles for 2007 in Australia =

Top 25 singles of 2007 < 2006 2008 >

Other Australian top charts for 2007
- top 25 albums
- Triple J Hottest 100

Australian number-one charts of 2007
- albums
- singles
- dance singles
- club tracks

The following lists the top 25 singles of 2007 in Australia from the Australian Recording Industry Association (ARIA) End of Year Singles Chart. "Big Girls Don't Cry" by Fergie was the biggest song of the year, peaking at #1 for nine weeks and staying in the top 50 for 32 weeks; it also had the longest stay at #1.

| # | Title | Artist | Highest pos. reached | Weeks at No. 1 |
|---|---|---|---|---|
| 1. | "Big Girls Don't Cry" | Fergie | 1 | 9 |
| 2. | "Girlfriend" | Avril Lavigne | 1 | 6 |
| 3. | "Umbrella" | Rihanna | 1 | 6 |
| 4. | "Straight Lines" | Silverchair | 1 | 4 |
| 5. | "Lips of an Angel" | Hinder | 1 | 7 |
| 6. | "Apologize" | Timbaland presents OneRepublic | 1 | 8* |
| 7. | "Grace Kelly" | Mika | 2 | |
| 8. | "Candyman" | Christina Aguilera | 2 | |
| 9. | "The Sweet Escape" | Gwen Stefani feat. Akon | 2 | |
| 10. | "Beautiful Girls" | Sean Kingston | 1 | 5 |
| 11. | "The Way I Are" | Timbaland feat. Keri Hilson and D.O.E. | 1 | 2 |
| 12. | "Dance Floor Anthem (I Don't Want to Be in Love)" | Good Charlotte | 2 | |
| 13. | "Glamorous" | Fergie feat. Ludacris | 2 | |
| 14. | "This Ain't a Scene, It's an Arms Race" | Fall Out Boy | 4 | |
| 15. | "In This Life" | Delta Goodrem | 1 | 1 |
| 16. | "Thnks fr th Mmrs" | Fall Out Boy | 3 | |
| 17. | "Destination Calabria" | Alex Gaudino feat. Crystal Waters | 3 | |
| 18. | "How to Save a Life" | The Fray | 2 | |
| 19. | "Stronger" | Kanye West | 2 | |
| 20. | "20 Good Reasons" | Thirsty Merc | 4 | |
| 21. | "Hey There Delilah" | Plain White T's | 3 | |
| 22. | "Hook Me Up" | The Veronicas | 1 | 1 |
| 23. | "Love Today" | Mika | 3 | |
| 24. | "How Far We've Come" | Matchbox Twenty | 7 | |
| 25. | "Say It Right" | Nelly Furtado | 2 | |

*5 weeks in 2007, and 3 in 2008
