= SOS (Rihanna song) =

2006 single by Rihanna

Single by Rihanna

from the album A Girl Like Me
- B-side: "Break It Off"; "Let Me"
- Released: February 13, 2006
- Studio: Barmitzvah Hall, Century City; The Loft Recording, Bronxville
- Genre: Dance-pop; synth-pop; R&B
- Length: 3:59
- Label: Def Jam; SRP
- Songwriters: Jonathan Rotem; Evan Bogart; Edward Cobb
- Producer: J. R. Rotem

Rihanna singles chronology
"If It's Lovin' that You Want" (2005)	"SOS" (2006)	"Unfaithful" (2006)

Music video
- "SOS" on YouTube

"SOS" is a song by the Barbadian singer Rihanna, and included in her second album, A Girl Like Me (2006). It was released on February 13, 2006, through Def Jam Recordings as the lead single of the album. "SOS" was written by J. R. Rotem and E. Kidd Bogart, with additional credit assigned to Ed Cobb for inspiration built around a sample of Soft Cell's 1981 recording of "Tainted Love". This song was written by Cobb in 1965, later influencing the creation of "SOS". Production of the dance-pop, synth-pop and R&B song was handled by Rotem. Critical reception of "SOS" was generally positive, with the majority of music critics praising the inclusion of the "Tainted Love" sample. Some critics compared "SOS" to Rihanna's debut single, "Pon de Replay".

"SOS" became a commercial success. In the United States, it topped the Billboard Hot 100 chart for three consecutive weeks, becoming Rihanna's first number one single on the chart. "SOS" peaked at number one on the US Hot Dance Club Songs chart and Mainstream Top 40 chart. "SOS" was certified triple Platinum by the Recording Industry Association of America (RIAA) for sales and streams of 3,000,000 units. The song was also successful in Europe as well as Australia, where it spent eight consecutive weeks at number one.

Three music videos were shot for "SOS"; aside from the official music video, directed by Chris Applebaum, promotional campaign videos were shot for lingerie brand Agent Provocateur and Nike. "SOS" was performed live at the 2006 MTV Europe Music Awards in Copenhagen, Denmark. "SOS" was included on the set list of the Good Girl Gone Bad Tour (2007–2009) and the Last Girl on Earth (2010–11), which saw Rihanna perform a rock-tinged version of the song.

== Background and conception ==
"SOS" was written by J. R. Rotem and Evan "Kidd" Bogart, with production helmed by Rotem. The song was recorded at Bartmitzvah Hall Studios, Century City, California, and Loft Recording Studios, Bronxville, New York, after which it was mixed by Phil Tan at Silent Sound Studios in Atlanta. "SOS" contains a sample of "Tainted Love", written by Ed Cobb in 1964, and popularized by English synthpop duo Soft Cell in 1981. Cobb was assigned a writing credit because of the sample. In an interview with HitQuarters, Rotem explained the song's conception, saying "I heard 'Tainted Love' and wanted to take the bass line and update it with a new swing. When I gave the track to Evan Bogart, the '80s feeling was already in the track." "SOS" was originally intended to be given to and recorded by former Def Jam labelmate Christina Milian, for her third studio album, So Amazin' (2006), but Milian passed on it and former Def Jam CEO and chairman L.A. Reid offered the song to Rihanna instead. During a 2024 interview, Bogart admitted that he had strung together the second verse of "SOS" using hidden '80s song titles. Rotem was asked how he felt about working with singers who became successful international recording artists after he had worked with them in an interview with William E. Ketchum for HipHopDX in May 2011, and referred to Rihanna and writing "SOS" in his response, saying:

I did Rihanna's song “SOS” and it wasn't her first song, but it was her first number one. Since then, she's obviously one of the biggest stars in the world. But I never look at it like that's because of me or something like that. I just look at it like it was amazing to have worked with her at that time, and I would like to work with her again.

== Production and mixing ==
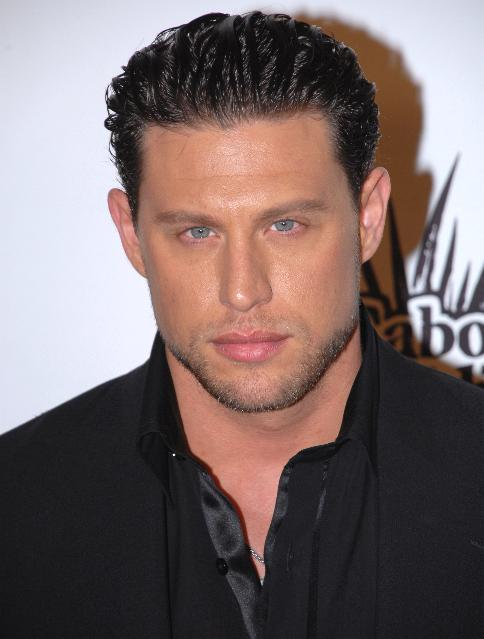
J. R. Rotem co-wrote and produced "SOS", and came up with the idea of sampling "Tainted Love", written by Ed Cobb in 1965.

The background vocals in the song were compressed using a compressor program called Waves Renaissance Compressor, which was used in order to create an enhanced polished effect. In an interview with Sound on Sound, mixing engineer Phil Tan, who carried out the audio mixing on "SOS", explained that he compressed the background vocals because "SOS" is a "high energy track", and he wanted the vocals to complement it. Tan also noted that the background vocals were pitch shifted to increase tonal quality and create an enhanced effect during the chorus. The pitch shifting consisted of making the left vocals flat and the right vocals sharp, with varying degrees of delay, and later mixing them together. When asked about the production of the lead vocals, Tan described the song as "a pounding type of song, and the lyrics are a cry for help, so the vocals need to be 'in your face', almost aggressive," and said that he wanted the vocals to remain constant. As with the background vocals, the lead vocals were compressed using the Waves Renaissance Compressor. Tan continued to note that the lack of reverb included on "SOS" was largely due to the fact that being an uptempo dance-pop song, there was not a lot of room left to add anything else. Tan explained the production process of sampling "Tainted Love", as well as the changes which were made:

This song uses a stereo two-bar loop from Soft Cell's song 'Tainted Love' as its basis. J.R. played the additional parts with a combination of soft and hardware synths. There were probably 30 to 40 tracks in total. J.R. tends to give you [Pro Tools] Sessions that have a clear direction: there's not much guesswork. I didn't change or add much, just a bass drum and taking out the loop a couple of times for additional breaks. There was never any doubt that it was going to be a clubby song, so it had to be very immediate and hard-hitting.

== Composition ==
"SOS"
A 23 second audio sample of Rihanna singing the chorus of "SOS". The sample includes the synth riffs and machine beats instrumental, as well as the layered and compressed vocals.

"SOS" is an up-tempo dance-pop, synth-pop and R&B song. The song includes synth riffs and machine beats as part of its instrumental. The lyrical content of the song is based around the theme of a "boy meets girl" scenario; Quentin B. Huff of PopMatters provided a synopsis of the lyrical content, writing that "SOS" is a "classic tale of girl-sees-boy, girl-falls-head-over-heels, girl-dreams-of-boy-so-much-she-loses-herself, girl-sings-catchy-pop-song-about-boy, girl-sells-lots-of-records". The song's instrumental composition is built around a prominent sample of "Tainted Love", which was originally written by Ed Cobb in 1965 and popularised by English synthpop duo Soft Cell, when they released their cover version in 1981.

Bogart revealed in a 2024 interview that he intentionally hid the titles of past pop songs—all but one of which being Billboard Hot 100 number ones—in the lyrics: "The whole second verse of that song is '80s song titles strung together as sentences because I thought it would be clever." The lyrics reference Cutting Crew's "(I Just) Died in Your Arms," Tears for Fears' "Head over Heels," "You Keep Me Hangin' On" (a popular cover of which was released by Kim Wilde in the 1980s), Michael Jackson's "The Way You Make Me Feel" and "Take On Me," as well as the band that recorded it, a-ha. He claimed "no one" had noticed the homages.

== Release ==
"SOS" was first released in France on March 27, 2006, as a physical maxi single. The maxi single included both the radio edit and instrumental versions of "SOS", as well as the album track "Break It Off", which features Jamaican reggae singer Sean Paul. In Australia, the song was released to download digitally through the iTunes Store on April 3, 2006, with non-single track "Let Me" featuring as the B-side. In the United States, "SOS" was released on April 11, 2006, as a CD single. In Germany, the song was released on April 15, 2006, also as a physical maxi single. The package consisted of the radio edit and instrumental versions of "SOS" and "Break It Off", in addition to the music video for "SOS". In the United Kingdom, "SOS" was released on April 17, 2006, as a CD single.

== Critical reception ==
Upon the release of the album, "SOS" garnered positive reviews from music critics. Bill Lamb of About.com praised the sampling of Cobb's "Tainted Love" and Rihanna's vocal performance, with specific regard to her lower register. However, Lamb criticized Rihanna for not displaying any sense of originality. Additionally, Lamb compared Rihanna's vocal performance in the song to Beyoncé, writing "The echoes of Beyonce in the higher register are weaker." Sal Cinquemani of Slant Magazine praised the sample and noted that "SOS" rivals Rihanna's debut single "Pon de Replay" (Music of the Sun, 2005). Despite praising "SOS", Cinquemani continued to write that it was the only song on A Girl Like Me which displayed a high level of "audacity". David Jeffries of AllMusic described "SOS" as a "sexy club tune".

The use of the 'Tainted Love' sample was well received by critics. Ruth Jamieson of The Observer commented that the sample was an "outrageously hooky Soft Cell rhythm". Jazzily Bass of Contactmusic.com complimented the inclusion of the "Tainted Love" sample, describing "SOS" as "superbly infectious". Bass continued to praise the song for not making the sample too obvious, writing "I was accepting it to sound like every other song that has sampled the hook." Kelefa Sanneh of The New York Times described the inclusion the "Tainted Love" sample as being "brazen" and "astute".

Quentin B. Huff of PopMatters was complimentary of the song, writing, "all things considered, '[SOS]' is a decent song, brimming with energy and perfectly suited to Rihanna’s layered vocals." Barry Walters of Rolling Stone wrote, "Barbados-born emigre Rihanna's huge dancehall pop hit last year, "Pon De Replay," was savvy and sexy, and her new smash, "SOS," is even more so. Singing a snaky Destiny's Child-like melody around synth riffs and machine beats from Soft Cell's '80s classic hit "Tainted Love," Rihanna proves America still appreciates clever pop when it hears it."

=== Year-end lists ===
Year-end critics' rankings
Publication	Rank	List
Pitchfork Media	95	The 100 Best Tracks of 2006

== Chart performance ==
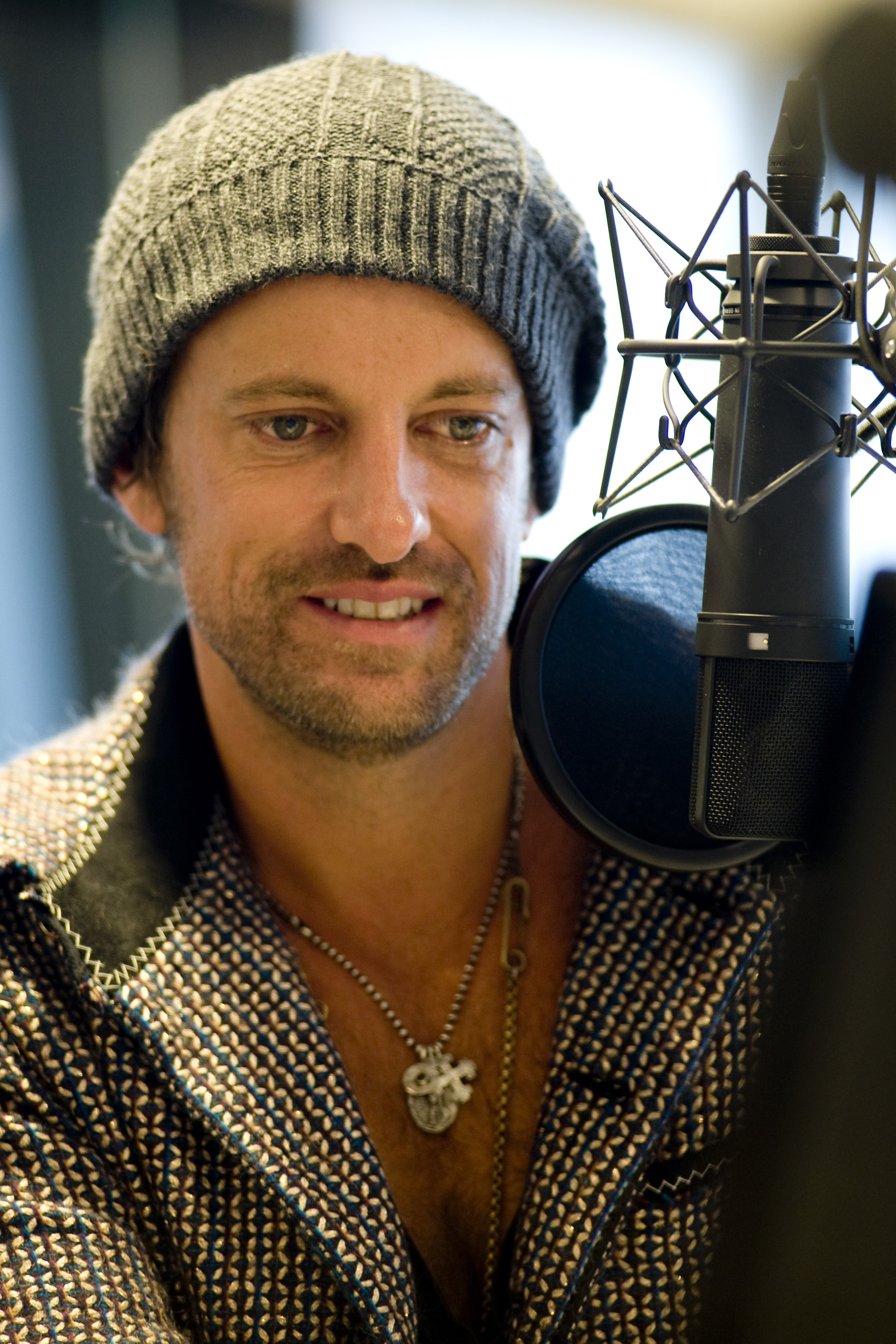
"SOS" displaced Daniel Powter's (pictured) "Bad Day", which spent five consecutive weeks atop the chart, from the number one position on the US Billboard Hot 100 .

In the United States, "SOS" peaked at number one on the Billboard Hot 100 chart in the chart issue dated May 13, 2006, leaping 33 positions from the previous week, and became the singer's first number one single on the Hot 100. "SOS" experienced a surge in sales the week prior to reaching the summit of the chart, due to Def Jam holding off of releasing the song to digital outlets before the release of A Girl Like Me. The song displaced Daniel Powter"s "Bad Day", which had spent the previous five weeks atop the chart, from number one. "SOS" stayed atop the Hot 100 for a further two weeks, spending three consecutive weeks at number one. "SOS" also peaked at number one on the US Hot Dance Club Songs and Pop Songs charts. The song also peaked at number seven on the Radio Songs chart and peaked at number 40 on the Adult Contemporary chart. On March 12, 2021, "SOS" was certified triple Platinum by the Recording Industry Association of America (RIAA).

In Europe, "SOS" achieved moderate chart success in different countries. In Belgium (Flanders), the song debuted at number 18 on April 22, 2006, and peaked at number two in its fourth week charting. In Switzerland, "SOS" debuted and peaked at number three on May 21, 2006, and stayed inside the top-ten of that countries singles chart for the following nine weeks. In Finland, the song spent two weeks on the countries singles chart; "SOS" debuted and peaked at number two on April 24, 2006, and fell to number 14 to following week. In Norway, "SOS" debuted at number 16 on April 17, 2006, and peaked at number three in its third week charting. Elsewhere, the song attained top-five positions on the singles charts of Austria and Belgium (Wallonia), peaking at numbers four and five, respectively. " SOS" attained top-ten positions in The Netherlands and Italy, peaking at numbers six and seven, respectively. The song failed to chart within the top-ten in France and Sweden, peaking at number 12 on both countries singles charts.

In the United Kingdom, "SOS" debuted at number five on April 22, 2006. The following week, the song rose to number two, being held off of the number one position by Gnarls Barkley's "Crazy". In its third week charting, both "SOS" and "Crazy" retained their respective chart positions. Over the following weeks, "SOS" began to come down the top 10 of the chart, falling to number five for two weeks, whilst "Crazy" retained its number one position. In Australia, "SOS" debuted at number one on April 30, 2006, a position it held for eight consecutive weeks. In New Zealand, the song debuted at number 37 on April 10, 2006, and spent the following five weeks fluctuating in the lower region of the top 40 singles. In its seventh week charting, the song leaped to a peak of number three for two weeks.

== Music videos ==
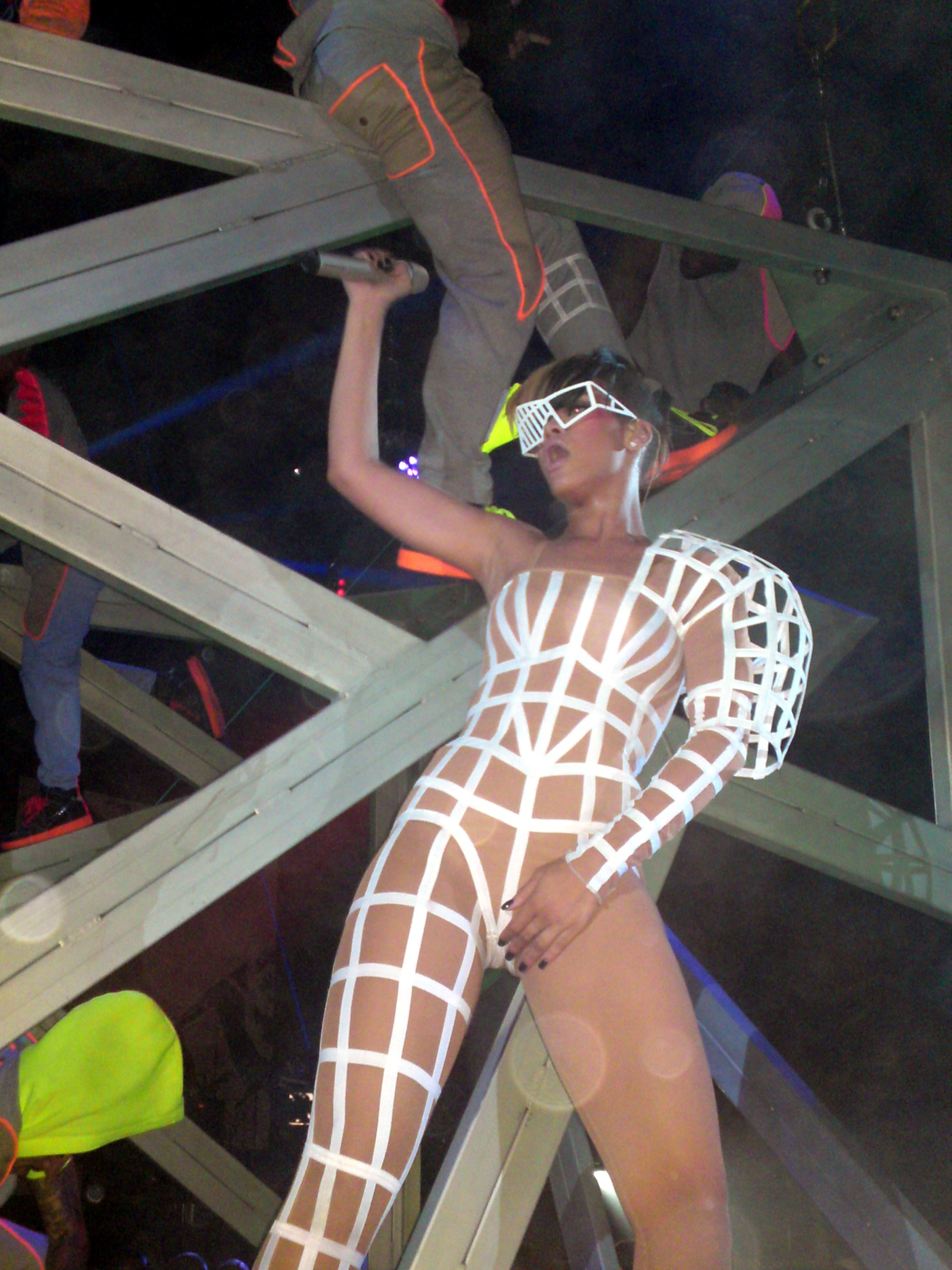
Rihanna performing "SOS" during her Last Girl on Earth tour

"SOS" received two separate treatments for the music video, each serving a different purpose. In addition to the official music video, another version was shot for a Nike campaign. The official music video and Nike versions were directed by Chris Applebaum, who later directed the music video for "Umbrella" featuring Jay-Z (Good Girl Gone Bad, 2007). These videos was edited by Nabil Mechi from Murex, who later edit the music videos for "Umbrella" and "Rockstar 101".

=== Official music video ===
The video begins with Rihanna singing the hook while wearing a low-cut green dress and dancing in front of tropical trees on an island. Key lighting is used to place emphasis on Rihanna, whilst the backdrop remains virtually dark and invisible. For the first verse, Rihanna is featured dancing against a plain grey background, wearing a white top and sequined silver miniskirt, whilst flirtatiously dancing with the male dancer. Halfway through the verse, another scene is introduced, with Rihanna wearing a pink dress in a mirrored room, showing multiple reflections of the singer from different angles. For the first chorus, Rihanna is mainly featured wearing the green dress on the island, but a new scene of Rihanna wearing a midriff-baring black lace is introduced toward the end of the chorus, where she, as well as four male dancers, perform a choreographed dance routine. Scenes of Rihanna in the mirrored room are intercut with the previous scene for the duration of the chorus. For the second verse, a further scene of Rihanna is depicted, this time featuring the scenes performing a dance routine with a three female dancers, in the same setting as the one at the beginning of the video. For the second chorus, another scene of the singer sitting on a chair whilst listening to music is shown. For the remainder of the video, including the bridge and last chorus, all scenes featured in the video are intercut with one another, displaying a total of five different scenes and settings.

=== Nike version ===
The video begins with a long shot of a group of dancers who have just finished rehearsing a dance routine. As the dancers walk out of view, Rihanna walks onto the middle of the floor, where the singer turns, and faces the camera, and closes her eyes. Standing still, Rihanna begins to snap her fingers, whereby the screen begins to cut between a scene of Rihanna, who is noticeably in a different setting, and black fades. As the music begins to play, it becomes apparent that the setting has changed from a rehearsal studio into a nightclub, which Rihanna in the center. The scene is fairly dark with different colored lights projected into different areas of the nightclub, as dancers infiltrate the dance floor surrounding Rihanna. This scene is used for the first verse-chorus-verse part of the song, but changes to a scene of Rihanna, accompanied by several dancers, situated in a gym locker room for the second chorus. For the bridge, the scene changes back to Rihanna in the nightclub, but this time in a different change of outfit. This scene is used for the last chorus. The video ends with a close-up of Rihanna in the nightclub standing still as the audio finishes, where she closes her eyes, which prompts the scene to change back to Rihanna in the middle of the rehearsal studio from the beginning of the video, to which she walks out of view of the camera.

== Track listings ==
- Australian and European CD single
1. "SOS" (radio edit) — 4:01
2. "Let Me" (album version) — 3:56
- UK CD single
1. "SOS" (album version) — 3:59
2. "SOS" (Nevins Glam Club Mix) — 7:43
- CD maxi single
1. "SOS" (radio edit) — 4:01
2. "SOS" (instrumental) — 4:01
3. "Break It Off" featuring Sean Paul — 3:33
4. "SOS" (Video)
- European 12-inch vinyl
1. "SOS" (radio edit) — 4:01
2. "SOS" (instrumental) — 4:01
3. "SOS" (Nevins Electrotek club mix)
- US 12-inch vinyl
1. "SOS" (album version) — 3:59
2. "SOS" (instrumental) — 4:01

== Credits and personnel ==
Credits are adapted from the liner notes of A Girl Like Me, Def Jam Recordings, SRP Records.

Recording and sample

- Recorded at Bartmitzvah Hall Studios in Century City, and Loft Recording Studios in Bronxville.
- Mixed at Silent Sound Studios in Atlanta.
- Contains elements from the composition "Tainted Love", written by Ed Cobb under Embassy Music Corporation (BMI).

Personnel

- Songwriting – J. R. Rotem, Evan "Kidd" Bogart, Ed Cobb
- Production – J. R. Rotem
- Recording – J. R. Rotem, Al Hemberger
- Mixing – Phil Tan
- Assistant mixing engineer – Rob Skipworth
- Vocal production – Evan Rogers, Carl Sturken
- Lead and background vocals – Rihanna, Evan Rogers

== Accolades ==
Accolades
Year	Ceremony	Award	Result
2006	MTV Video Music Awards	Viewer's Choice	Nominated
2006	MTV Video Music Awards	Best New Artist in a Video	Nominated
2006	MTV Europe Music Awards	Best Song	Nominated
2006	MuchMusic Video Awards	International Video of the Year - Artist	Won
2006	MuchMusic Video Awards	UR Fave International Artist/Group	Nominated
2006	Radio Disney Music Awards	Best Song	Nominated
2006	Teen Choice Awards	Choice: Music Single	Nominated
2007	Barbados Music Awards	Best Music Video	Nominated
2007	Barbados Music Awards	Best Dance Single	Nominated

== Charts ==
=== Weekly charts ===
Weekly chart performance
Chart (2006)	Peak position
Australia (ARIA)	1
Australian Urban (ARIA)	1
Austria (Ö3 Austria Top 40)	4
Belgium (Ultratop 50 Flanders)	2
Belgium (Ultratop 50 Wallonia)	5
Belgium Dance (Ultratop Flanders)	9
Canada (Nielsen SoundScan)	1
Canada CHR/Pop (Radio & Records)	1
Canada CHR/Top 40 (Billboard)	16
Canada Hot AC (Billboard)	35
CIS Airplay (TopHit)	18
Croatia (HRT)	4
Czech Republic Airplay (ČNS IFPI)	13
Denmark (Tracklisten)	10
European Hot 100 Singles (Billboard)	1
Finland (Suomen virallinen lista)	2
France (SNEP)	12
Germany (GfK)	2
Hungary (Dance Top 40)	6
Hungary (Rádiós Top 40)	2
Ireland (IRMA)	3
Italy (FIMI)	7
Netherlands (Dutch Top 40)	6
Netherlands (Single Top 100)	6
New Zealand (Recorded Music NZ)	3
Norway (VG-lista)	3
Romania (Romanian Top 100)	28
Russia Airplay (TopHit)	27
Scottish Singles Sales (Official Charts)	2
Slovakia Airplay (ČNS IFPI)	54
Sweden (Sverigetopplistan)	12
Switzerland (Schweizer Hitparade)	3
UK Singles (Official Charts)	2
UK Hip Hop/R&B (Official Charts)	2
US Billboard Hot 100	1
US Adult Contemporary (Billboard)	40
US Adult Pop Airplay (Billboard)	17
US Dance Club Songs (Billboard)	1
US Dance Airplay (Billboard)	1
US Pop Airplay (Billboard)	1
US Rhythmic Airplay (Billboard)	13

2023 weekly chart performance
Chart (2023)	Peak position
US Hot Dance/Electronic Songs (Billboard)	14

=== Year-end charts ===
Year-end chart performance
Chart (2006)	Position
Australia (ARIA)	13
Australian Urban (ARIA)	1
Austria (Ö3 Austria Top 40	26
Belgium (Ultratop 50 Flanders)	26
Belgium (Ultratop 50 Wallonia)	25
CIS (TopHit)	110
European Hot 100 Singles (Billboard)	16
France (SNEP)	87
Germany (Media Control GfK)	25
Hungary (Dance Top 40)	39
Hungary (Radios Top 40)	29
Netherlands (Dutch Top 40)	36
Netherlands (Single Top 100)	30
New Zealand (RIANZ)	17
Romania (Romanian Top 100)	93
Russia Airplay (TopHit)	174
Sweden (Hitlistan)	86
Switzerland (Schweizer Hitparade)	20
UK Singles (OCC)	9
UK Urban (Music Week)	32
US Billboard Hot 100	19
US Dance Club Play (Billboard)	17
US Hot Dance Airplay (Billboard)	1

== Certifications ==
Certifications
Region	Certification	Certified units/sales
Australia (ARIA)	5× Platinum	350,000^{‡}
Brazil (Pro-Música Brasil)	3× Platinum	180,000^{‡}
Brazil (Pro-Música Brasil) DMS	Platinum	60,000^{*}
Denmark (IFPI Danmark)	Platinum	8,000^{^}
Germany (BVMI)	Gold	150,000^{‡}
Japan (RIAJ)	Gold	100,000^{*}
New Zealand (RMNZ)	2× Platinum	60,000^{‡}
Sweden (GLF)	Gold	10,000^{^}
United Kingdom (BPI)	Platinum	600,000^{‡}
United States (RIAA)	3× Platinum	3,000,000^{‡}
United States (RIAA) Mastertone	Gold	500,000^{*}
^{*} Sales figures based on certification alone.^{^} Shipments figures based on certification alone.^{‡} Sales+streaming figures based on certification alone.

== Release history ==
Release dates and formats
Region	Date	Format(s)	Label(s)	Ref.
United States	February 13, 2006	Contemporary hit radio; rhythmic contemporary radio	Def Jam; SRP	
Germany	April 15, 2006	CD; maxi CD	Universal Music	
Australia	April 17, 2006	CD	Universal Music	
United Kingdom	April 17, 2006	CD	Mercury	

== See also ==
- List of Billboard Hot 100 number ones of 2006
- List of Billboard Hot Dance Club Play number ones of 2006
