= List of number-one singles of 2007 (Australia) =

ARIA Charts number-one singles of 2007 < 2006 2008 >

Other Australian number-one charts of 2007
- albums
- dance singles
- club tracks

Top Australian singles and albums of 2007
- Triple J Hottest 100
- top 25 singles
- top 25 albums

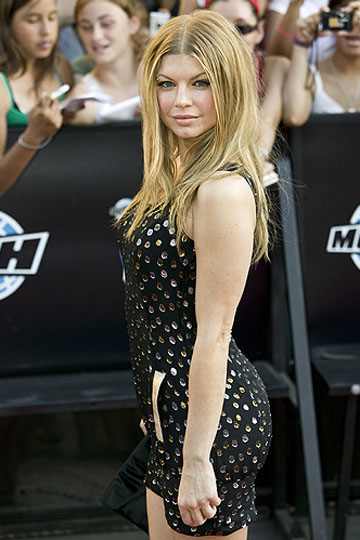
Fergie's "Big Girls Don't Cry" was the longest running number-one single of 2007, having topped the ARIA Singles Chart for nine consecutive weeks.

The ARIA Singles Chart ranks the best-performing singles in Australia. Its data, published by the Australian Recording Industry Association, is based collectively on each single's weekly physical and digital sales. In 2007, 14 singles claimed the top spot, including Beyoncé's "Irreplaceable", which started its peak position in late 2006. Nine acts achieved their first number-one single in Australia, either as a lead or featured artist: Evermore, Hinder, Jay-Z, Fergie, Sean Kingston, Timbaland, Keri Hilson, The Veronicas and OneRepublic.

Timbaland earned two number-one singles during the year for "The Way I Are" and "Apologize". Fergie's "Big Girls Don't Cry" was the longest-running number-one single of 2007, having topped the ARIA Singles Chart for nine consecutive weeks. Hinder's "Lips of an Angel" topped the chart for seven consecutive weeks, while Avril Lavigne's "Girlfriend", Rihanna's "Umbrella", and Timbaland's "Apologize" each spent six weeks at the number-one spot. Kingston's "Beautiful Girls" spent five weeks at number one and Silverchair's "Straight Lines" topped the chart for four weeks. Kylie Minogue also achieved her tenth number-one in Australia in 2007, with "2 Hearts" spending one week at the top of the charts.

== Chart history ==
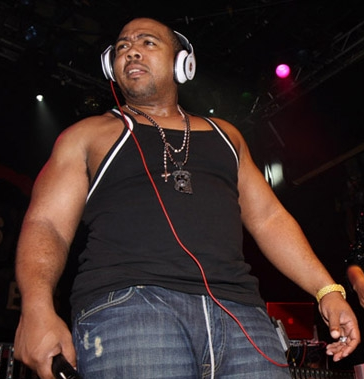
Timbaland earned his first and second number-one single when "The Way I Are" and "Apologize" both topped the ARIA Singles Chart.

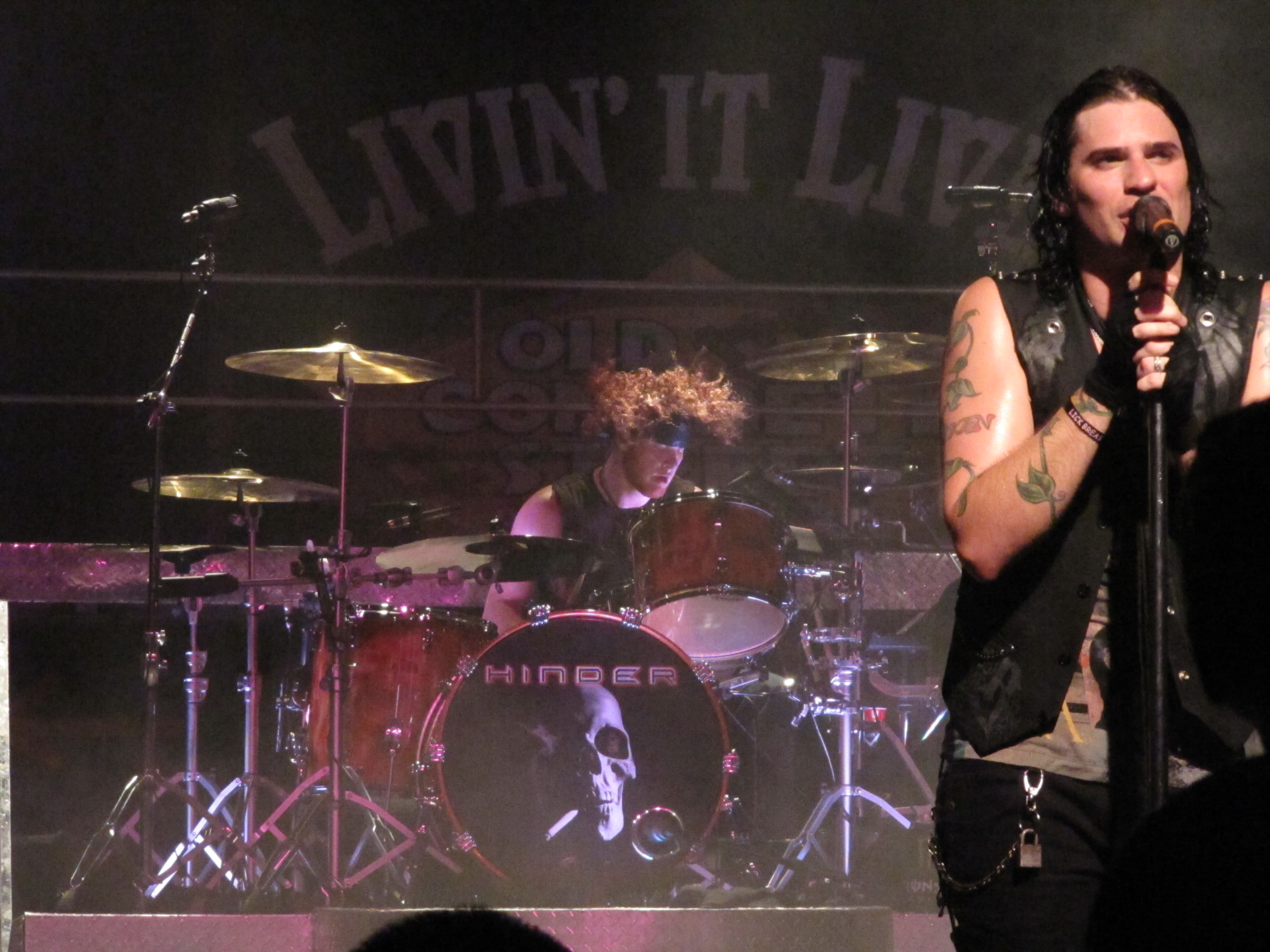
Hinder's "Lips of an Angel" topped the ARIA Singles Chart for seven consecutive weeks, becoming their first number-one single on the chart.

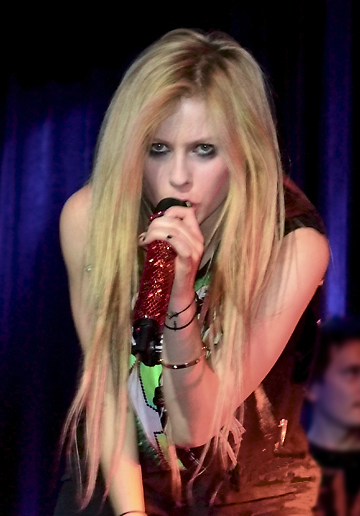
Avril Lavigne's "Girlfriend" topped the ARIA Singles Chart for six weeks, becoming her second number-one single on the chart.

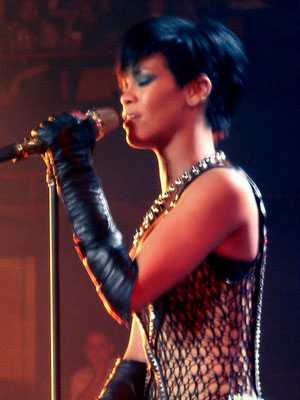
Rihanna's "Umbrella" topped the ARIA Singles Chart for six weeks, becoming her second number-one single on the chart.

Key
The yellow background indicates the #1 song on ARIA's End of Year Singles Chart of 2007.

Date	Song	Artist(s)	Ref.
7 January	"Irreplaceable"	Beyoncé	
14 January	"Irreplaceable"	Beyoncé	
21 January	"Light Surrounding You"	Evermore	
28 January	"Lips of an Angel"	Hinder	
4 February	"Lips of an Angel"	Hinder	
11 February	"Lips of an Angel"	Hinder	
18 February	"Lips of an Angel"	Hinder	
25 February	"Lips of an Angel"	Hinder	
4 March	"Lips of an Angel"	Hinder	
11 March	"Lips of an Angel"	Hinder	
18 March	"Straight Lines"	Silverchair	
25 March	"Straight Lines"	Silverchair	
1 April	"Straight Lines"	Silverchair	
8 April	"Straight Lines"	Silverchair	
15 April	"Girlfriend"	Avril Lavigne	
22 April	"Steer"	Missy Higgins	
29 April	"Girlfriend"	Avril Lavigne	
6 May	"Girlfriend"	Avril Lavigne	
13 May	"Girlfriend"	Avril Lavigne	
20 May	"Girlfriend"	Avril Lavigne	
27 May	"Girlfriend"	Avril Lavigne	
3 June	"Umbrella"	Rihanna featuring Jay-Z	
10 June	"Umbrella"	Rihanna featuring Jay-Z	
17 June	"Umbrella"	Rihanna featuring Jay-Z	
24 June	"Umbrella"	Rihanna featuring Jay-Z	
1 July	"Umbrella"	Rihanna featuring Jay-Z	
8 July	"Umbrella"	Rihanna featuring Jay-Z	
15 July	"Big Girls Don't Cry"	Fergie	
22 July	"Big Girls Don't Cry"	Fergie	
29 July	"Big Girls Don't Cry"	Fergie	
5 August	"Big Girls Don't Cry"	Fergie	
12 August	"Big Girls Don't Cry"	Fergie	
19 August	"Big Girls Don't Cry"	Fergie	
26 August	"Big Girls Don't Cry"	Fergie	
2 September	"Big Girls Don't Cry"	Fergie	
9 September	"Big Girls Don't Cry"	Fergie	
16 September	"Beautiful Girls"	Sean Kingston	
23 September	"In This Life"	Delta Goodrem	
30 September	"Beautiful Girls"	Sean Kingston	
7 October	"Beautiful Girls"	Sean Kingston	
14 October	"Beautiful Girls"	Sean Kingston	
21 October	"Beautiful Girls"	Sean Kingston	
28 October	"The Way I Are"	Timbaland featuring Keri Hilson	
4 November	"The Way I Are"	Timbaland featuring Keri Hilson	
11 November	"Hook Me Up"	The Veronicas	
18 November	"2 Hearts"	Kylie Minogue	
25 November	"Apologize"	Timbaland featuring OneRepublic	
2 December	"Apologize"	Timbaland featuring OneRepublic	
9 December	"Apologize"	Timbaland featuring OneRepublic	
16 December	"Apologize"	Timbaland featuring OneRepublic	
23 December	"Apologize"	Timbaland featuring OneRepublic	
30 December	"Apologize"	Timbaland featuring OneRepublic	

== Number-one artists ==
Position	Artist	Weeks at No. 1
1	Fergie	9
2	Timbaland	8
3	Hinder	7
4	Avril Lavigne	6
4	Rihanna	6
4	Jay-Z (as featuring)	6
4	OneRepublic (as featuring)	6
5	Sean Kingston	5
6	Silverchair	4
7	Beyoncé	2
7	Keri Hilson (as featuring)	2
8	Evermore	1
8	Missy Higgins	1
8	Delta Goodrem	1
8	The Veronicas	1
8	Kylie Minogue	1

== See also ==
- 2007 in music
- List of number-one albums of 2007 (Australia)
- List of top 25 singles for 2007 in Australia
- List of top 10 singles for 2007 in Australia
