= List of number-one dance singles of 2007 (Australia) =

ARIA Charts number-one dance singles of 2007 < 2006 2008 >

Other Australian number-one charts of 2007
- albums
- singles
- club tracks

Top Australian singles and albums of 2007
- Triple J Hottest 100
- top 25 singles
- top 25 albums

The ARIA Dance Chart is a chart that ranks the best-performing dance singles of Australia. It is published by Australian Recording Industry Association (ARIA), an organisation who collect music data for the weekly ARIA Charts. To be eligible to appear on the chart, the recording must be a single, and be "predominantly of a dance nature, or with a featured track of a dance nature, or included in the ARIA Club Chart or a comparable overseas chart".

== Chart history ==
Issue date	Song	Artist(s)	Reference
1 January	"I Don't Feel Like Dancin'"	Scissor Sisters	
8 January	"I Don't Feel Like Dancin'"	Scissor Sisters	
15 January	"I Don't Feel Like Dancin'"	Scissor Sisters	
22 January	"Rock This Party (Everybody Dance Now)"	Bob Sinclar	
29 January	"Rock This Party (Everybody Dance Now)"	Bob Sinclar	
5 February	"Rock This Party (Everybody Dance Now)"	Bob Sinclar	
12 February	"Rock This Party (Everybody Dance Now)"	Bob Sinclar	
19 February	"Rock This Party (Everybody Dance Now)"	Bob Sinclar	
26 February	"Rock This Party (Everybody Dance Now)"	Bob Sinclar	
5 March	"Rock This Party (Everybody Dance Now)"	Bob Sinclar	
12 March	"Rock This Party (Everybody Dance Now)"	Bob Sinclar	
19 March	"Rock This Party (Everybody Dance Now)"	Bob Sinclar	
26 March	"What Goes Around... Comes Around"	Justin Timberlake	
2 April	"What Goes Around... Comes Around"	Justin Timberlake	
9 April	"What Goes Around... Comes Around"	Justin Timberlake	
16 April	"What Goes Around... Comes Around"	Justin Timberlake	
23 April	"What Goes Around... Comes Around"	Justin Timberlake	
30 April	"What Goes Around... Comes Around"	Justin Timberlake	
7 May	"What Goes Around... Comes Around"	Justin Timberlake	
14 May	"What Goes Around... Comes Around"	Justin Timberlake	
21 May	"The Others"	TV Rock vs. Dukes of Windsor	
28 May	"The Others"	TV Rock vs. Dukes of Windsor	
4 June	"The Others"	TV Rock vs. Dukes of Windsor	
11 June	"The Others"	TV Rock vs. Dukes of Windsor	
18 June	"Destination Calabria"	Alex Gaudino featuring Crystal Waters	
25 June	"Destination Calabria"	Alex Gaudino featuring Crystal Waters	
2 July	"Destination Calabria"	Alex Gaudino featuring Crystal Waters	
9 July	"Destination Calabria"	Alex Gaudino featuring Crystal Waters	
16 July	"Destination Calabria"	Alex Gaudino featuring Crystal Waters	
23 July	"Destination Calabria"	Alex Gaudino featuring Crystal Waters	
30 July	"Destination Calabria"	Alex Gaudino featuring Crystal Waters	
6 August	"Destination Calabria"	Alex Gaudino featuring Crystal Waters	
13 August	"Can't Touch It"	Ricki-Lee	
20 August	"Can't Touch It"	Ricki-Lee	
27 August	"Can't Touch It"	Ricki-Lee	
3 September	"Can't Touch It"	Ricki-Lee	
10 September	"Can't Touch It"	Ricki-Lee	
17 September	"Can't Touch It"	Ricki-Lee	
24 September	"Can't Touch It"	Ricki-Lee	
1 October	"Can't Touch It"	Ricki-Lee	
8 October	"Don't You Wanna Feel"	Rogue Traders	
15 October	"Gimme More"	Britney Spears	
22 October	"Gimme More"	Britney Spears	
29 October	"Gimme More"	Britney Spears	
5 November	"Gimme More"	Britney Spears	
12 November	"Gimme More"	Britney Spears	
19 November	"Gimme More"	Britney Spears	
26 November	"Don't Hold Back"	The Potbelleez	
3 December	"Don't Hold Back"	The Potbelleez	
10 December	"Don't Hold Back"	The Potbelleez	
17 December	"Don't Hold Back"	The Potbelleez	
24 December	"Don't Hold Back"	The Potbelleez	
31 December	"Don't Hold Back"	The Potbelleez	

== Number-one artists ==
Position	Artist	Weeks at No. 1
1	Bob Sinclar	9
2	Ricki-Lee	8
2	Alex Gaudino	8
2	Crystal Waters (as featuring)	8
2	Justin Timberlake	8
3	Britney Spears	6
3	The Potbelleez	6
4	TV Rock	4
4	Dukes of Windsor	4
5	Scissor Sisters	3
6	Rogue Traders	1

== See also ==
- 2007 in music
- List of number-one singles of 2007 (Australia)
- List of number-one club tracks of 2007 (Australia)
