= List of number-one singles of 2006 (Australia) =

ARIA Charts number-one singles of 2006 < 2005 2007 >

Other Australian number-one charts of 2006
- albums
- dance singles

Top Australian singles and albums of 2006
- Triple J Hottest 100
- top 25 singles
- top 25 albums

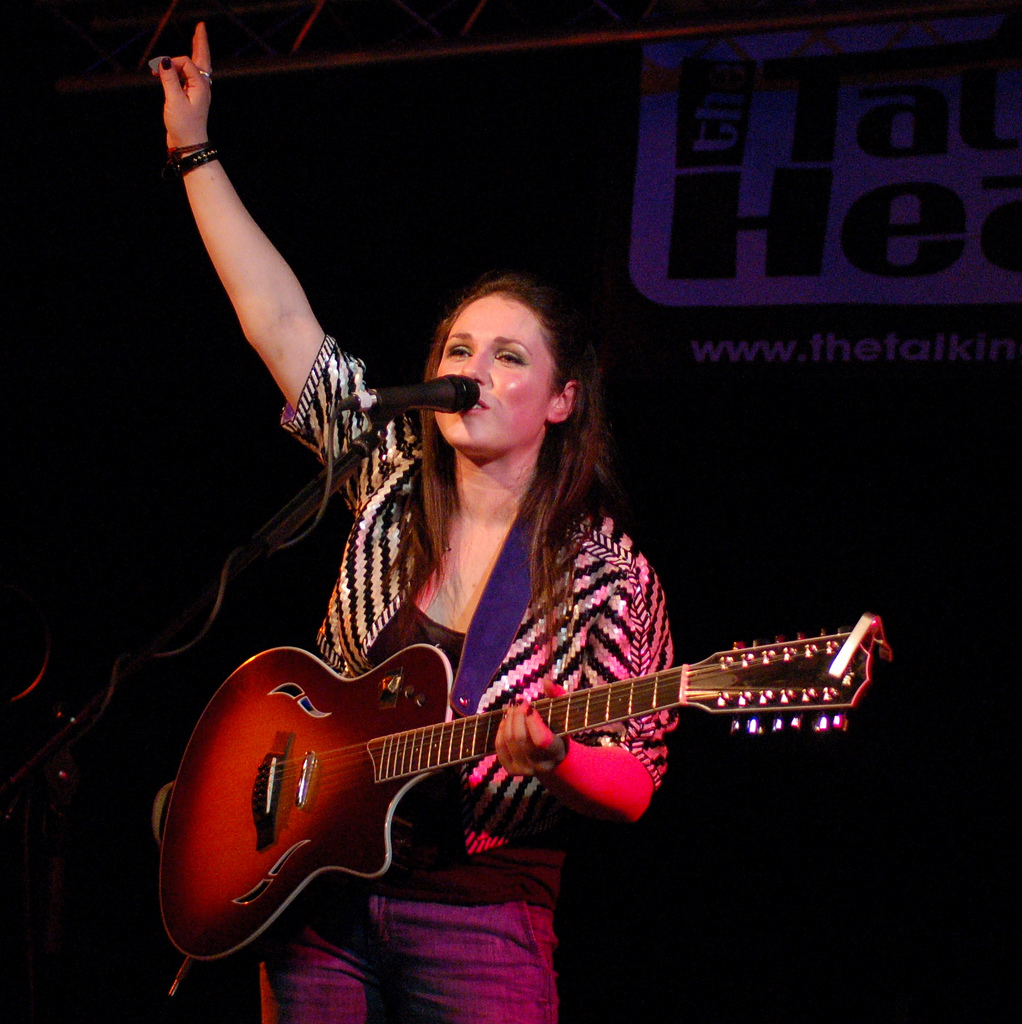
Sandi Thom's "I Wish I Was a Punk Rocker (With Flowers in My Hair)" was the biggest-selling single of 2006, having topped the ARIA Singles Chart for ten consecutive weeks.

The ARIA Singles Chart ranks the best-performing singles in Australia. Its data, published by the Australian Recording Industry Association, is based collectively on each single's weekly physical and digital sales. In 2006, 14 singles claimed the top spot, including Lee Harding's "Wasabi"/"Eye of the Tiger", which started its peak position in late 2005.

Thirteen acts achieved their first number-one single in Australia, either as a lead or featured artist: Chris Brown, Bob Sinclar, Gary Pine, TV Rock, Seany B, Youth Group, Rihanna, Wyclef Jean, Sandi Thom, Green Day, Scissor Sisters, Damien Leith and Beyoncé. Five collaborations topped the chart. Thom's "I Wish I Was a Punk Rocker (With Flowers in My Hair)" was the longest-running number-one single of 2006, having topped the ARIA Singles Chart for ten consecutive weeks. Shakira's "Hips Don't Lie" topped the chart for nine consecutive weeks, Rihanna's "SOS" stayed at number-one for eight consecutive weeks, TV Rock's "Flaunt It" stayed at number-one for five weeks and Leith spent four weeks at number-one with "Night of My Life".

== Chart history ==
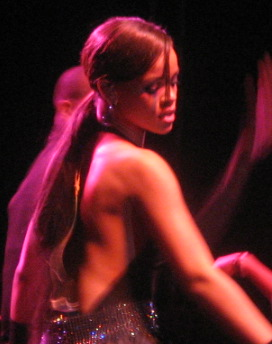
Rihanna's "SOS" topped the ARIA Singles Chart for eight consecutive weeks, becoming her first number-one single on the chart.

Key
The yellow background indicates the #1 song on ARIA's End of Year Singles Chart of 2006.

Date	Song	Artist(s)	Ref.
1 January	"Wasabi"/"Eye of the Tiger"	Lee Harding	
8 January	"Wasabi"/"Eye of the Tiger"	Lee Harding	
15 January	"Wasabi"/"Eye of the Tiger"	Lee Harding	
22 January	"Run It!"	Chris Brown featuring Juelz Santana	
29 January	"When I'm Gone"	Eminem	
5 February	"Run It!"	Chris Brown featuring Juelz Santana	
12 February	"Run It!"	Chris Brown featuring Juelz Santana	
19 February	"Love Generation"	Bob Sinclar presents Goleo VI featuring Gary "Nesta" Pine	
26 February	"Love Generation"	Bob Sinclar presents Goleo VI featuring Gary "Nesta" Pine	
5 March	"Flaunt It"	TV Rock featuring Seany B	
12 March	"Flaunt It"	TV Rock featuring Seany B	
19 March	"Flaunt It"	TV Rock featuring Seany B	
26 March	"Flaunt It"	TV Rock featuring Seany B	
2 April	"Forever Young"	Youth Group	
9 April	"Flaunt It"	TV Rock featuring Seany B	
16 April	"Forever Young"	Youth Group	
23 April	"SOS"	Rihanna	
30 April	"SOS"	Rihanna	
7 May	"SOS"	Rihanna	
14 May	"SOS"	Rihanna	
21 May	"SOS"	Rihanna	
28 May	"SOS"	Rihanna	
4 June	"SOS"	Rihanna	
11 June	"SOS"	Rihanna	
18 June	"Hips Don't Lie"	Shakira featuring Wyclef Jean	
25 June	"Hips Don't Lie"	Shakira featuring Wyclef Jean	
2 July	"Hips Don't Lie"	Shakira featuring Wyclef Jean	
9 July	"Hips Don't Lie"	Shakira featuring Wyclef Jean	
16 July	"Hips Don't Lie"	Shakira featuring Wyclef Jean	
23 July	"Hips Don't Lie"	Shakira featuring Wyclef Jean	
30 July	"Hips Don't Lie"	Shakira featuring Wyclef Jean	
6 August	"Hips Don't Lie"	Shakira featuring Wyclef Jean	
13 August	"Hips Don't Lie"	Shakira featuring Wyclef Jean	
20 August	"SexyBack"	Justin Timberlake	
27 August	"SexyBack"	Justin Timberlake	
3 September	"I Wish I Was a Punk Rocker (With Flowers in My Hair)"	Sandi Thom	
10 September	"I Wish I Was a Punk Rocker (With Flowers in My Hair)"	Sandi Thom	
17 September	"I Wish I Was a Punk Rocker (With Flowers in My Hair)"	Sandi Thom	
24 September	"I Wish I Was a Punk Rocker (With Flowers in My Hair)"	Sandi Thom	
1 October	"I Wish I Was a Punk Rocker (With Flowers in My Hair)"	Sandi Thom	
8 October	"I Wish I Was a Punk Rocker (With Flowers in My Hair)"	Sandi Thom	
15 October	"I Wish I Was a Punk Rocker (With Flowers in My Hair)"	Sandi Thom	
22 October	"I Wish I Was a Punk Rocker (With Flowers in My Hair)"	Sandi Thom	
29 October	"I Wish I Was a Punk Rocker (With Flowers in My Hair)"	Sandi Thom	
5 November	"I Wish I Was a Punk Rocker (With Flowers in My Hair)"	Sandi Thom	
12 November	"The Saints Are Coming"	U2 and Green Day	
19 November	"I Don't Feel Like Dancin'"	Scissor Sisters	
26 November	"I Don't Feel Like Dancin'"	Scissor Sisters	
3 December	"Night of My Life"	Damien Leith	
10 December	"Night of My Life"	Damien Leith	
17 December	"Night of My Life"	Damien Leith	
24 December	"Night of My Life"	Damien Leith	
31 December	"Irreplaceable"	Beyoncé	

== Number-one artists ==
Position	Artist	Weeks at No. 1
1	Sandi Thom	10
2	Shakira	9
2	Wyclef Jean (as featuring)	9
3	Rihanna	8
4	TV Rock	5
4	Seany B (as featuring)	5
5	Damien Leith	4
6	Lee Harding	3
6	Chris Brown	3
6	Juelz Santana (as featuring)	3
7	Bob Sinclar	2
7	Gary Pine (as featuring)	2
7	Youth Group	2
7	Justin Timberlake	2
7	Scissor Sisters	2
8	Eminem	1
8	U2	1
8	Green Day	1
8	Beyoncé	1

== See also ==
- 2006 in music
- List of number-one albums of 2006 (Australia)
