= List of number-one dance singles of 2006 (Australia) =

ARIA Charts number-one dance singles of 2006 < 2005 2007 >

Other Australian number-one charts of 2006
- albums
- singles

Top Australian singles and albums of 2006
- Triple J Hottest 100
- top 25 singles
- top 25 albums

The ARIA Dance Chart is a chart that ranks the best-performing dance singles of Australia. It is published by Australian Recording Industry Association (ARIA), an organisation who collect music data for the weekly ARIA Charts. To be eligible to appear on the chart, the recording must be a single, and be "predominantly of a dance nature, or with a featured track of a dance nature, or included in the ARIA Club Chart or a comparable overseas chart".

== Chart history ==
Issue date	Song	Artist(s)	Reference
2 January	"Hung Up"	Madonna	
9 January	"Hung Up"	Madonna	
16 January	"Hung Up"	Madonna	
23 January	"Hung Up"	Madonna	
30 January	"Love Generation"	Bob Sinclar	
6 February	"Love Generation"	Bob Sinclar	
13 February	"Love Generation"	Bob Sinclar	
20 February	"Love Generation"	Bob Sinclar	
27 February	"Love Generation"	Bob Sinclar	
6 March	"Flaunt It"	TV Rock featuring Seany B	
13 March	"Flaunt It"	TV Rock featuring Seany B	
20 March	"Flaunt It"	TV Rock featuring Seany B	
27 March	"Flaunt It"	TV Rock featuring Seany B	
3 April	"Flaunt It"	TV Rock featuring Seany B	
10 April	"Flaunt It"	TV Rock featuring Seany B	
17 April	"Flaunt It"	TV Rock featuring Seany B	
24 April	"Flaunt It"	TV Rock featuring Seany B	
1 May	"Flaunt It"	TV Rock featuring Seany B	
8 May	"Flaunt It"	TV Rock featuring Seany B	
15 May	"Flaunt It"	TV Rock featuring Seany B	
22 May	"Flaunt It"	TV Rock featuring Seany B	
29 May	"Crazy"	Gnarls Barkley	
5 June	"Crazy"	Gnarls Barkley	
12 June	"Crazy"	Gnarls Barkley	
19 June	"Crazy"	Gnarls Barkley	
26 June	"Crazy"	Gnarls Barkley	
3 July	"Crazy"	Gnarls Barkley	
10 July	"Crazy"	Gnarls Barkley	
17 July	"Crazy"	Gnarls Barkley	
24 July	"Crazy"	Gnarls Barkley	
31 July	"Crazy"	Gnarls Barkley	
7 August	"Crazy"	Gnarls Barkley	
14 August	"Crazy"	Gnarls Barkley	
21 August	"SexyBack"	Justin Timberlake	
28 August	"SexyBack"	Justin Timberlake	
4 September	"SexyBack"	Justin Timberlake	
11 September	"SexyBack"	Justin Timberlake	
18 September	"SexyBack"	Justin Timberlake	
25 September	"SexyBack"	Justin Timberlake	
2 October	"SexyBack"	Justin Timberlake	
9 October	"SexyBack"	Justin Timberlake	
16 October	"SexyBack"	Justin Timberlake	
23 October	"SexyBack"	Justin Timberlake	
30 October	"I Don't Feel Like Dancin'"	Scissor Sisters	
6 November	"I Don't Feel Like Dancin'"	Scissor Sisters	
13 November	"I Don't Feel Like Dancin'"	Scissor Sisters	
20 November	"I Don't Feel Like Dancin'"	Scissor Sisters	
27 November	"I Don't Feel Like Dancin'"	Scissor Sisters	
4 December	"I Don't Feel Like Dancin'"	Scissor Sisters	
11 December	"I Don't Feel Like Dancin'"	Scissor Sisters	
18 December	"I Don't Feel Like Dancin'"	Scissor Sisters	
25 December	"I Don't Feel Like Dancin'"	Scissor Sisters	

== Number-one artists ==
Position	Artist	Weeks at No. 1
1	Gnarls Barkley	12
1	TV Rock	12
1	Seany B as featuring	12
2	Justin Timberlake	10
3	Scissor Sisters	9
4	Bob Sinclar	5
5	Madonna	4

== See also ==
- 2006 in music
- List of number-one singles of 2006 (Australia)
- List of number-one club tracks of 2006 (Australia)
