= List of number-one albums of 2007 (Australia) =

ARIA Charts number-one albums of 2007 < 2006 2008 >

Other Australian number-one charts of 2007
- singles
- dance singles
- club tracks

Top Australian singles and albums of 2007
- Triple J Hottest 100
- top 25 singles
- top 25 albums

These are the Australian number-one albums of 2007, per the ARIA Charts.

Key
The yellow background indicates the #1 album on ARIA's End of Year Albums Chart of 2007.

Date		Song	Artist
January	1	The Winner's Journey	Damien Leith
January	8	The Winner's Journey	Damien Leith
January	15	The Winner's Journey	Damien Leith
January	22	Eyes Open	Snow Patrol
January	29	Eyes Open	Snow Patrol
February	5	Eyes Open	Snow Patrol
February	12	Eyes Open	Snow Patrol
February	19	Eyes Open	Snow Patrol
February	26	Extreme Behavior	Hinder
March	5	How to Save a Life	The Fray
March	12	How to Save a Life	The Fray
March	19	Extreme Behavior	Hinder
March	26	Extreme Behavior	Hinder
April	2	Grand National	John Butler Trio
April	9	Young Modern	Silverchair
April	16	Young Modern	Silverchair
April	23	Young Modern	Silverchair
April	30	Young Modern	Silverchair
May	7	On a Clear Night	Missy Higgins
May	14	Call Me Irresponsible	Michael Bublé
May	21	Call Me Irresponsible	Michael Bublé
May	28	Minutes to Midnight	Linkin Park
June	4	I'm Not Dead	Pink
June	11	Dream Days at the Hotel Existence	Powderfinger
June	18	The Traveling Wilburys Collection	Traveling Wilburys
June	25	The Traveling Wilburys Collection	Traveling Wilburys
July	2	Call Me Irresponsible	Michael Bublé
July	9	Call Me Irresponsible	Michael Bublé
July	16	Time on Earth	Crowded House
July	23	Call Me Irresponsible	Michael Bublé
July	30	The Dutchess	Fergie
August	6	The Dutchess	Fergie
August	13	The Dutchess	Fergie
August	20	The Dutchess	Fergie
August	27	Where We Land	Damien Leith
September	3	One Chance	Paul Potts
September	10	One Chance	Paul Potts
September	17	Curtis	50 Cent
September	24	All the Lost Souls	James Blunt
October	1	Echoes, Silence, Patience & Grace	Foo Fighters
October	8	Exile on Mainstream	Matchbox Twenty
October	15	Exile on Mainstream	Matchbox Twenty
October	22	Exile on Mainstream	Matchbox Twenty
October	29	Delta	Delta Goodrem
November	5	Long Road Out of Eden	Eagles
November	12	Long Road Out of Eden	Eagles
November	19	Greatest Hits	Spice Girls
November	26	Long Road Out of Eden	Eagles
December	3	X	Kylie Minogue
December	10	Long Road Out of Eden	Eagles
December	17	Long Road Out of Eden	Eagles
December	24	Long Road Out of Eden	Eagles
December	31	Shock Value	Timbaland

== See also ==
- 2007 in music
- List of number-one singles in Australia in 2007
