= List of top 25 albums for 2007 in Australia =

Top 25 albums of 2007 < 2006 2008 >

Other Australian top charts for 2007
- top 25 singles
- Triple J Hottest 100

Australian number-one charts of 2007
- albums
- singles
- dance singles
- club tracks

These are the top 25 albums of 2007 in Australia from the Australian Recording Industry Association (ARIA) End of Year Albums Chart.

== Top 25 ==
#	Title	Artist	Highest pos. reached	Weeks at No. 1
1.	Call Me Irresponsible	Michael Bublé	1	5
2.	I'm Not Dead	Pink	1	2
3.	FutureSex/LoveSounds	Justin Timberlake	1	1
4.	On a Clear Night	Missy Higgins	1	1
5.	The Dutchess	Fergie	1	4
6.	Dream Days at the Hotel Existence	Powderfinger	1	1
7.	Grand National	John Butler Trio	1	1
8.	Long Road Out of Eden	The Eagles	1	6
9.	Young Modern	Silverchair	1	4
10.	Timbaland Presents Shock Value	Timbaland	1	5
11.	Exile on Mainstream	Matchbox Twenty	1	3
12.	Minutes to Midnight	Linkin Park	1	1
13.	Delta	Delta Goodrem	1	1
14.	Infinity on High	Fall Out Boy	4	
15.	Sneaky Sound System	Sneaky Sound System	5	
16.	Eyes Open	Snow Patrol	1	5
17.	The Traveling Wilburys Collection	Traveling Wilburys	1	2
18.	Life in Cartoon Motion	Mika	5	
19.	The Best Damn Thing	Avril Lavigne	2	
20.	Echoes, Silence, Patience & Grace	Foo Fighters	1	1
21.	The Sweet Escape	Gwen Stefani	2	
22.	The Memphis Album	Guy Sebastian	3	
23.	Good Morning Revival	Good Charlotte	5	
24.	Extreme Behavior	Hinder	1	3
25.	Loose	Nelly Furtado	4	
