= List of top 25 singles for 2006 in Australia =

Top 25 singles of 2006 < 2005 2007 >

Other Australian top charts for 2006
- top 25 albums
- Triple J Hottest 100

Australian number-one charts of 2006
- albums
- singles
- dance singles

The following lists the top 25 singles of 2006 in Australia from the Australian Recording Industry Association (ARIA) End of Year singles chart.

"I Wish I Was a Punk Rocker (With Flowers in My Hair)" by Sandi Thom was the biggest song of the year, peaking at No. 1 for ten weeks and staying in the top 50 for 34 weeks, this song was also the longest number one of the year.

Singles in the top 25 of the ARIA chart in 2006
#	Title	Artist	Highest pos. reached	Weeks at No. 1	Ref.
1.	"I Wish I Was a Punk Rocker (With Flowers in My Hair)"	Sandi Thom	1	10	
2.	"Flaunt It"	TV Rock feat. Seany B	1	5	
3.	"Hips Don't Lie"	Shakira feat. Wyclef Jean	1	9	
4.	"SexyBack"	Justin Timberlake	1	2	
5.	"I Don't Feel Like Dancin'"	Scissor Sisters	1	2	
6.	"This Time I Know It's for Real"	Young Divas	2	—	
7.	"Forever Young"	Youth Group	1	2	
8.	"Wasabi/Eye of the Tiger"	Lee Harding	1	5 (Note: 1 week in 2005, and 4 in 2006)	
9.	"Who Knew"	Pink	2	—	
10.	"Promiscuous"	Nelly Furtado feat. Timbaland	2	—	
11.	"Night of My Life"	Damien Leith	1	4	
12.	"Love Generation"	Bob Sinclar	1	2	
13.	"SOS"	Rihanna	1	8	
14.	"You Raise Me Up"	Westlife	3	—	
15.	"Goodbye My Lover"	James Blunt	3	—	
16.	"Crazy"	Gnarls Barkley	2	—	
17.	"Buttons"	The Pussycat Dolls feat. Snoop Dogg	2	—	
18.	"Black Fingernails, Red Wine"	Eskimo Joe	6	—	
19.	"Unfaithful"	Rihanna	2	—	
20.	"Run It!	Chris Brown feat. Juelz Santana	1	3	
21.	"Maneater"	Nelly Furtado	3	—	
22.	"Mistake"	Stephanie McIntosh	3	—	
23.	"Irreplaceable"	Beyoncé	1	3 (Note: 3 weeks in 2007)	
24.	"Beep"	The Pussycat Dolls feat. will.i.am	3	—	
25.	"U + Ur Hand"	Pink	5	—	
26.	"Smack That"	Akon feat. Eminem	2	—	
27.	"London Bridge"	Fergie	3	—	
28.	"So Sick"	Ne-Yo	4	—	
29.	"Stickwitu"	The Pussycat Dolls	2	—	
30.	"Temperature"	Sean Paul	5	—	
31.	"Pump It"	The Black Eyed Peas	6	—	
32.	"Call Me When You're Sober"	Evanescence	5	—	
33.	"What's Left of Me"	Nick Lachey	7	—	
34.	"Ain't No Other Man"	Christina Aguilera	6	—	
35.	"My Love"	Justin Timberlake feat. T.I.	3	—	
36.	"My Humps"	The Black Eyed Peas	1	2 (Note: 2 weeks in 2005)	
37.	"Watching You"	Rogue Traders	5	—	
38.	"Hung Up"	Madonna	1	1 (Note: 1 week in 2005)	
39.	"Stupid Girls"	Pink	4	—	
40.	"Light Surrounding You"	Evermore	1	1 (Note: 1 week in 2007)	
41.	"Together We Are One"	Delta Goodrem	2	—	
42.	"When It All Falls Apart"	The Veronicas	7	—	
43.	"Lift"	Shannon Noll	10	—	
44.	"Running"	Evermore	5	—	
45.	"Push the Button"	Sugababes	3	—	
46.	"When I'm Gone"	Eminem	1	1	
47.	"Rock This Party (Everybody Dance Now)"	Bob Sinclar	6	—	
48.	"Everything I'm Not"	The Veronicas	7	—	
49.	"Maybe Tonight"	Kate DeAraugo	1	2 (Note: 2 weeks in 2005)	
50.	"I Write Sins Not Tragedies"	Panic! at the Disco	12	—	
51.	"Don't Give Up"	Shannon Noll and Natalie Bassingthwaighte	2	—	
52.	"Just Feel Better"	Santana	7	—	
53.	"Far Away"	Nickelback	2	—	
54.	"Dani California"	Red Hot Chili Peppers	8	—	
55.	"I Don't Need a Man"	The Pussycat Dolls	6	—	
56.	"Taller, Stronger, Better"	Guy Sebastian	3	—	
57.	"Sarah"	Eskimo Joe	12	—	
58.	"Because of You"	Kelly Clarkson	4	—	
59.	"Lonely"	Shannon Noll	8	—	
60.	"Gasolina"	Daddy Yankee	12	—	
61.	"The Saints Are Coming"	U2 and Green Day	1	1	
62.	"Me & U"	Cassie	12	—	
63.	"L.O.V.E."	Ashlee Simpson	5	—	
64.	"If It's Lovin' that You Want"	Rihanna	9	—	
65.	"Nasty Girl"	The Notorious B.I.G.	15	—	
66.	"Faded"	Kate DeAraugo	8	—	
67.	"Wind It Up"	Gwen Stefani	5	—	
68.	"Hurt"	Christina Aguilera	9	—	
69.	"Joker & the Thief"	Wolfmother	8	—	
70.	"When You Were Young"	The Killers	10	—	
71.	"Welcome to the Black Parade"	My Chemical Romance	14	—	
72.	"Happenin' All Over Again"	Young Divas	9	—	
73.	"Moonshine"	Savage	9	—	
74.	"For You I Will (Confidence)"	Teddy Geiger	12	—	
75.	"Wisemen"	James Blunt	11	—	
76.	"Fergalicious"	Fergie	4	—	
77.	"Stars Are Blind"	Paris Hilton	7	—	
78.	"Sorry"	Madonna	4	—	
79.	"Over My Head (Cable Car)"	The Fray	22	—	
80.	"Window Shopper"	50 Cent	13	—	
81.	"Grillz"	Nelly feat. Paul Wall and Ali & Gipp	11	—	
82.	"Thunder in My Heart Again"	Meck feat. Leo Sayer	16	—	
83.	"I'm Not Missing You"	Stacie Orrico	26	—	
84.	"You Give Me Something"	James Morrison	7	—	
85.	"These Boots Are Made for Walkin'"	Jessica Simpson	2	—	
86.	"Miss Murder"	AFI	14	—	
87.	"Confessions of a Broken Heart (Daughter to Father)"	Lindsay Lohan	7	—	
88.	"Ugly"	Sugababes	13	—	
89.	"Don't Forget About Us"	Mariah Carey	12	—	
90.	"Beat of My Heart"	Hilary Duff	13	—	
91.	"Listen to Your Heart"	DHT	11	—	
92.	"Come to Me"	P. Diddy feat. Nicole Scherzinger	11	—	
93.	"Yo (Excuse Me Miss)"	Chris Brown	10	—	
94.	"We Are the Champions (Ding a Dang Dong)"	Crazy Frog	13	—	
95.	"Breaking Free"	Zac Efron and Vanessa Hudgens	13	—	
96.	"Not Ready to Make Nice"	Dixie Chicks	18	—	
97.	"But It's Better If You Do"	Panic! at the Disco	15	—	
98.	"Déjà Vu"	Beyoncé	12	—	
99.	"Savin' Me"	Nickelback	18	—	
100.	"All I Hear"	Kate Alexa	9	—	
