= List of top 25 albums for 2006 in Australia =

Top 25 albums of 2006 < 2005 2007 >

Other Australian top charts for 2006
- top 25 singles
- Triple J Hottest 100

Australian number-one charts of 2006
- albums
- singles
- dance singles

These are the top 25 albums of 2006 in Australia from the Australian Recording Industry Association (ARIA) End of Year Albums Chart.

== Top 25 ==
#	Title	Artist	Highest pos. reached	Weeks at No. 1
1.	Back to Bedlam	James Blunt	1	12
2.	I'm Not Dead	Pink	1	2
3.	Reach Out: The Motown Record	Human Nature	1	3
4.	Wolfmother	Wolfmother	3	
5.	The Winner's Journey	Damien Leith	1	5
6.	Here Come the Drums	Rogue Traders	2	
7.	Black Fingernails, Red Wine	Eskimo Joe	1	4
8.	Stadium Arcadium	Red Hot Chili Peppers	1	3
9.	Boned!	The 12th Man	1	1
10.	The Secret Life Of...	The Veronicas	2	
11.	All the Right Reasons	Nickelback	2	
12.	U218 Singles	U2	1	2
13.	Tea and Sympathy	Bernard Fanning	1	1
14.	Dancing in the Street: The Songs of Motown II	Human Nature	1	4
15.	Eyes Open	Snow Patrol	1	5
16.	Best of Chris Isaak	Chris Isaak	1	1
17.	PCD	The Pussycat Dolls	8	
18.	See the Sun	Pete Murray	1	3
19.	Monkey Business	The Black Eyed Peas	1	3
20.	Taking the Long Way	Dixie Chicks	2	
21.	Ancora	Il Divo	1	3
22.	Lift	Shannon Noll	1	1
23.	Rudebox	Robbie Williams	1	1
24.	Curtain Call: The Hits	Eminem	1	2
25.	Face to Face	Westlife	1	3
