= List of number-one albums of 2006 (Australia) =

ARIA Charts number-one albums of 2006 < 2005 2007 >

Other Australian number-one charts of 2006
- singles
- dance singles

Top Australian singles and albums of 2006
- Triple J Hottest 100
- top 25 singles
- top 25 albums

These are the Australian number-one albums of 2006, per the ARIA Charts.

Key
The yellow background indicates the #1 album on ARIA's End of Year Albums Chart of 2006.

Issue date	Album	Artist	Weeks at number one (total)
2 January	Curtain Call: The Hits	Eminem	2 weeks
9 January	Back to Bedlam	James Blunt	12 weeks
16 January	Back to Bedlam	James Blunt	12 weeks
23 January	Back to Bedlam	James Blunt	12 weeks
30 January	Back to Bedlam	James Blunt	12 weeks
6 February	Back to Bedlam	James Blunt	12 weeks
13 February	State of Emergency	The Living End	1 week
20 February	Sing-A-Longs and Lullabies for the Film Curious George	Jack Johnson	1 week
27 February	Whatever People Say I Am, That's What I'm Not	Arctic Monkeys	1 week
6 March	Face to Face	Westlife	3 weeks
13 March	Face to Face	Westlife	3 weeks
20 March	Face to Face	Westlife	3 weeks
27 March	Both Sides of the Gun	Ben Harper	2 weeks
3 April	Both Sides of the Gun	Ben Harper	2 weeks
10 April	The Hard Road	Hilltop Hoods	1 week
17 April	Back to Bedlam	James Blunt	12 weeks
24 April	Back to Bedlam	James Blunt	12 weeks
1 May	Back to Bedlam	James Blunt	12 weeks
8 May	10,000 Days	Tool	1 week
15 May	Reach Out: The Motown Record	Human Nature	3 weeks
22 May	Stadium Arcadium	Red Hot Chili Peppers	3 weeks
29 May	Stadium Arcadium	Red Hot Chili Peppers	3 weeks
5 June	Stadium Arcadium	Red Hot Chili Peppers	3 weeks
12 June	Best of Chris Isaak	Chris Isaak	1 week
19 June	Black Fingernails, Red Wine	Eskimo Joe	4 weeks
26 June	Black Fingernails, Red Wine	Eskimo Joe	4 weeks
3 July	Black Fingernails, Red Wine	Eskimo Joe	4 weeks
10 July	Desert Lights	Something for Kate	1 week
17 July	Black Holes and Revelations	Muse	1 week
24 July	Black Fingernails, Red Wine	Eskimo Joe	4 weeks
31 July	High School Musical	Soundtrack	3 weeks
7 August	High School Musical	Soundtrack	3 weeks
14 August	High School Musical	Soundtrack	3 weeks
21 August	Back to Basics	Christina Aguilera	1 week
28 August	Carnival	Kasey Chambers	1 week
4 September	Modern Times	Bob Dylan	1 week
11 September	Revelations	Audioslave	1 week
18 September	FutureSex/LoveSounds	Justin Timberlake	1 week
25 September	Ta-Dah	Scissor Sisters	1 week
2 October	I'm Not Dead	Pink	2 weeks
9 October	The Open Door	Evanescence	2 weeks
16 October	The Open Door	Evanescence	2 weeks
23 October	Dancing in the Street: the Songs of Motown II	Human Nature	4 weeks
30 October	Rudebox	Robbie Williams	1 week
6 November	Dancing in the Street: the Songs of Motown II	Human Nature	4 weeks
13 November	Dancing in the Street: the Songs of Motown II	Human Nature	4 weeks
20 November	Dancing in the Street: the Songs of Motown II	Human Nature	4 weeks
27 November	U218 Singles	U2	2 weeks
4 December	U218 Singles	U2	2 weeks
11 December	Boned!	The 12th Man	1 week
18 December	The Winner's Journey	Damien Leith	5 weeks
25 December	The Winner's Journey	Damien Leith	5 weeks

== Notes ==
- Number of number one albums: 28
- Longest run at number one (during 2006): Back to Bedlam by James Blunt (8 weeks, 4 weeks previously in 2005; 3rd-longest run at #1 on the ARIA Albums Chart in the 2000s)
- Human Nature held the #1 position for two albums in the same year, with Reach Out: The Motown Record and Dancing in the Street: the Songs of Motown II.

== See also ==
- 2006 in music
- List of number-one singles in Australia of 2006
