= Jesse McCartney discography =

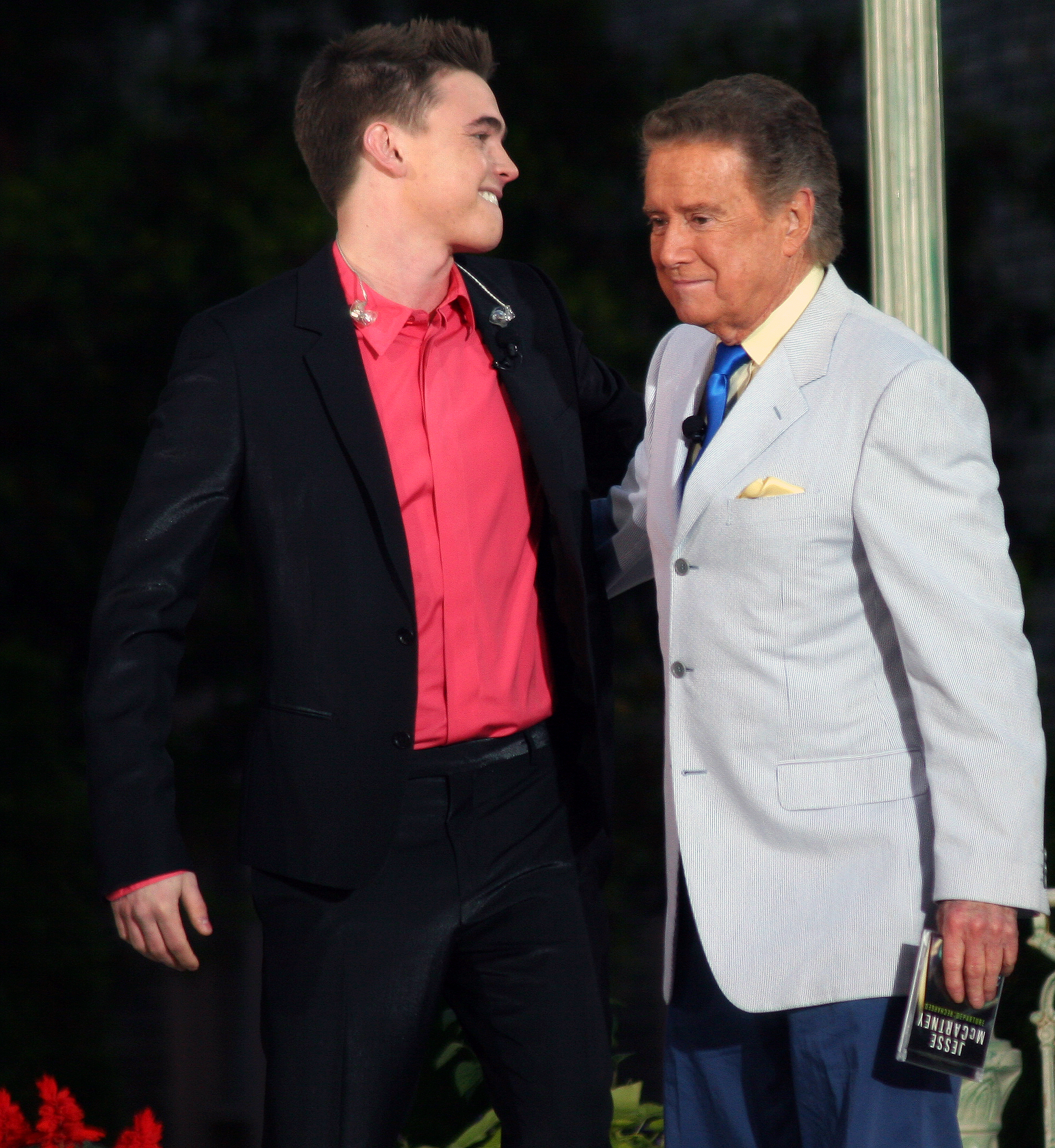
- Jesse McCartney with Regis Philbin on "Regis & Kelly Live" on April 7, 2009
- Studio albums: 5 released studio albums plus one unreleased studio albums
- Extended plays: 4
- Soundtrack albums: 19
- Live albums: 3
- Singles: 30
- Video albums: 2
- Music videos: 24

American pop singer and songwriter Jesse McCartney has released five studio albums, thirty singles, two live albums, four EPs, and two DVDs. According to Recording Industry Association of America, McCartney has sold 7 million digital singles and 1 million albums in the United States.

In 1999, McCartney began his music career as the youngest member of boy band Dream Street. They released one album to gold sales in the US, before breaking up in 2002. Two years later, he signed with Hollywood Records and launched as a solo artist with the debut single "Beautiful Soul", which became a worldwide hit. The album of the same name was a platinum seller in the US and Australia. In 2006, McCartney sported a harder rock sound on his second album Right Where You Want Me to less success. In 2008, he released his third album Departure and the album's first single "Leavin'" became his most successful US hit, gaining platinum status. He has also become known for his songwriting, having co-penned the worldwide number one "Bleeding Love" for English singer Leona Lewis.

== Albums ==
=== Studio albums ===
Title	Details	Peak chart positions										Certifications (sales threshold)
Title	Details	US	AUS	AUT	FRA	ITA	JPN	NL	NZ	SWI	UK	Certifications (sales threshold)
Beautiful Soul	Released: September 28, 2004; Label: Hollywood; Formats: CD, digital download	15	5	28	—	3	154	87	17	50	53	RIAA: Platinum; ARIA: Platinum; MC: Gold; RMNZ: 3× Gold
Right Where You Want Me	Released: September 13, 2006; Label: Hollywood; Formats: CD, digital download	15	49	—	83	7	57	—	—	90	153	FIMI: Gold
Departure	Released: May 20, 2008; Label: Hollywood; Formats: CD, digital download	14	92	—	174	15	111	—	—	—	97	
In Technicolor	Released: July 22, 2014; Label: Eight0Eight; Formats: CD, digital download	35	—	—	—	—	—	—	—	—	—	
New Stage	Released: October 8. 2021; Label: Blue Suit; Formats: Digital download, streaming, CD	—	—	—	—	—	—	—	—	—	—	
"—" denotes releases that did not chart.

=== Unreleased studio albums ===
Title	Details
Have It All	Scheduled: 2010–2013; Label: Hollywood

=== Live albums ===
Title	Details	Peak chart positions	
Title	Details	US	ITA
Live: The Beautiful Soul Tour	Released: November 15, 2005; Label: Hollywood; Format: CD, digital download	153	53
Live at the House of Blues, Sunset Strip	Released: November 23, 2009; Label: Hollywood; Format: digital download	—	—
The Resolution Tour Live	Released: October 28, 2019; Label: Blue Suit; Format: digital download	—	—
"—" denotes releases that did not chart.

=== Video albums ===
Title	Details	Certifications
Up Close	Released: 20 September 2005; Label: Hollywood; Format: DVD	ARIA: Gold
Live: The Beautiful Soul Tour	Released: 6 December 2005; Label: Hollywood; Format: DVD	

== Extended plays ==
Title	Details	Peak chart positions
Title	Details	US Indie
JMac	Released: July 22, 2003; Label: Hollywood; Format: CD	—
Off the Record	Released: January 11, 2005; Label: Hollywood; Format: CD	—
In Technicolor (Part I)	Released: December 10, 2013; Label: Eight0Eight; Format: digital download	46
All's Well	Released: April 5, 2024; Label: Blue Suit Records; Format: digital download, Vinyl	—
Weightless	Released: September 19, 2025; Label: Blue Suit Records; Format: digital download	—
"—" denotes releases that did not chart.

== Singles ==
=== As lead artist ===
Title	Year	Peak chart positions										Certifications (sales threshold)	Album
Title	Year	US	US Pop	AUS	CAN	FRA	GER	ITA	NZ	SWI	UK	Certifications (sales threshold)	Album
"Beautiful Soul"	2004	16	4	1	—	—	25	15	2	22	16	RIAA: 3× Platinum; ARIA: Platinum; BPI: Silver; RMNZ: 2× Platinum	Beautiful Soul
"She's No You"	2005	91	24	10	—	—	—	—	16	—	—		Beautiful Soul
"Get Your Shine On"	2005	—	—	34	—	—	—	—	—	—	—		Beautiful Soul
"Because You Live"	2005	—	—	—	—	—	—	3	—	—	—		Beautiful Soul
"Right Where You Want Me"	2006	33	31	20	—	24	—	6	30	52	54		Right Where You Want Me
"Just So You Know"	2006	—	—	—	—	—	90	8	—	—	—		Right Where You Want Me
"Just Go"	2006	—	—	—	—	—	—	—	—	—	—		Right Where You Want Me
"Leavin'"	2008	10	1	49	16	32	—	—	—	—	48	RIAA: 3× Platinum	Departure
"It's Over"	2008	62	22	—	98	—	—	—	—	—	—		Departure
"How Do You Sleep?" (featuring Ludacris)	2009	26	7	75	40	—	—	—	—	—	—		Departure
"Body Language" (featuring T-Pain)	2009	35	23	—	78	—	—	—	—	—	—	RIAA: Platinum; RMNZ: Gold	Departure
"Shake"	2010	54	17	—	—	—	—	—	—	—	—		Non-album singles
"One Night"	2010	—	—	—	—	—	—	—	—	—	—		Non-album singles
"Back Together"	2013	—	—	—	—	—	—	—	—	—	—		In Technicolor
"Superbad"	2014	—	—	—	—	—	—	—	—	—	—		In Technicolor
"Punch Drunk Recreation"	2014	—	—	—	—	—	—	—	—	—	—		In Technicolor
"Better with You"	2018	—	—	—	—	—	—	—	—	—	—		The Resolution Tour
"Wasted"	2018	—	—	—	—	—	—	—	—	—	—		The Resolution Tour
"Yours"	2020	—	—	—	—	—	—	—	—	—	—		New Stage
"Friends"	2020	—	—	—	—	—	—	—	—	—	—		New Stage
"Kiss the World Goodbye"	2021	—	—	—	—	—	—	—	—	—	—		New Stage
"Party for Two"	2021	—	—	—	—	—	—	—	—	—	—		New Stage
"Selfless"	2021	—	—	—	—	—	—	—	—	—	—		New Stage
"Faux Fur"	2024	—	—	—	—	—	—	—	—	—	—		All's Well
"Make a Baby" (featuring Yung Gravy)	2024	—	—	—	—	—	—	—	—	—	—		All's Well
"Silver Spoon" (Unplugged)	2024	—	—	—	—	—	—	—	—	—	—		All's Well
"Faux Fur" (Unplugged)	2024	—	—	—	—	—	—	—	—	—	—		All's Well
"Trip"	2024	—	—	—	—	—	—	—	—	—	—		Non-album singles
"Weightless"	2024	—	—	—	—	—	—	—	—	—	—		Non-album singles
"Dulce"	2024	—	—	—	—	—	—	—	—	—	—		Non-album singles
"—" denotes releases that did not chart.

=== As featured artist ===
Title	Year	Album
"Come Together Now" (among Come Together Now Collaborative)	2005	Hurricane Relief: Come Together Now
"Dangerous" (Built by Titan featuring Jesse McCartney)	2016	Non-album single

== Other album appearances ==
List of other album appearances, showing year released, and album name.
Title	Year	Album
"The Second Star to the Right"	2004	Disneymania 2
"Don't Go Breakin' My Heart" (with Anne Hathaway)	2004	Ella Enchanted
"The Best Day of My Life"	2004	A Cinderella Story
"Good Life"	2004	Stuck in the Suburbs
"Crush'n"	2004	Lizzie McGuire: Total Party!
"Winter Wonderland"	2004	Radio Disney Jingle Jams
"One Way or Another"	2004	Radio Disney Jingle Jams
"When You Wish Upon a Star"	2005	Disneymania 3
"I'll Try"	2006	Disneymania 4
"Please Come Home for Christmas"	2009	All Wrapped Up, Vol.2
"Up"	2010	Step Up 3D

== Songwriting credits ==
List of songwriting credits, showing year released, artist, and album name.
Title	Year	Artist(s)	Album
"Bleeding Love"	2007	Leona Lewis	Spirit
"Don't Leave"	2008	Vanessa Hudgens	Identified
"Amnesia"	2009	Dima Bilan	Believe
"The Wave"	2010	Toni Braxton	Pulse

== Music videos ==
Year	Title	Director
2004	"Beautiful Soul"	Marc Webb
2005	"She's No You"	Sanji
2005	"Get Your Shine On"; Features Kim Possible Movie clips	
2005	"Good Life"	
2005	"Because You Live"	Philip Andelman
2006	"Right Where You Want Me"	Big TV!
2006	"Just So You Know"	Declan Whitebloom
2008	"Leavin'"	Sanji
2008	"It's Over"	Rich Lee
2009	"How Do You Sleep?" (featuring Ludacris)	Rich Lee
2009	"Body Language" (featuring T-Pain)	Will Knapp
2010	"Shake"	Toben Seymour
2014	"Superbad"	
2014	"Punch Drunk Recreation"	
2018	"Better with You"	Jo Roy
2019	"Wasted"	Jason Lester
2020	"Yours"	
2020	"Friends"	
2021	"Kiss the World Goodbye"	
2021	"Party for Two"	
