= Right Where You Want Me =

Right Where You Want Me may refer to:

- "Right Where You Want Me" (song), a 2006 song by Jesse McCartney
- Right Where You Want Me (album), a 2006 album by Jesse McCartney
