= How Do You Sleep? =

How Do You Sleep? may refer to:

- "How Do You Sleep?" (John Lennon song), 1971
- "How Do You Sleep?" (Jesse McCartney song), 2009
- "How Do You Sleep?" (Sam Smith song), 2019
- "How Do You Sleep?", a 2017 song by LCD Soundsystem from American Dream
- "How Do You Sleep", a song by The Stone Roses from their 1994 album Second Coming
