= Dory Lobel =

- Born: Boston, Massachusetts, U.S.
- Occupations: Guitarist, bassist, songwriter, composer, producer, musical director
- Years active: 1998–present

Dory Lobel is an American musician, songwriter, composer and producer. Beginning his professional music career at the age of 18, Lobel is perhaps best known as the lead guitarist and musical director for NBC's The Voice, and performing with multi-platinum recording artists including Backstreet Boys, Colbie Caillat, Jesse McCartney, Hilary Duff and Enrique Iglesias.

== Early life ==
Lobel was born February 15, 1980, in Boston, Massachusetts, and raised in Tel-Aviv, Israel. He began studying music at age 3 when he asked his parents to buy him a guitar. Throughout his formative years, Lobel studied piano and attended the Tel-Aviv School of the Arts, where he focused mainly on the visual arts.

At age 13, Lobel began taking lessons with a local guitar instructor, and after several years of private lessons, he started learning music directly from his record collection studying the styles of guitar greats such as Jeff Beck, Jimi Hendrix and Albert King and artists such as Stevie Wonder, Earth, Wind & Fire, and Pink Floyd.

== Career ==
In 1998, at the age of 18, Lobel began playing guitar at local rock clubs and teaching guitar privately five days a week. Living in Israel at the time, he was drafted to the Israel Defense Forces for the mandatory service period of three years, and served at the research department of the Military Intelligence Corps. Towards the end of his military service, Lobel landed the guitar spot in the house-band of a successful R&B club. The musicians in the band were some of the most successful and well-known session musicians in Israel who kept him working and performing in different projects throughout the following year.

In 2003, Lobel moved to Los Angeles and enrolled in the world-renowned guitar program at Hollywood's Musician's Institute. On his first day at Musician's Institute, Lobel took his placement tests and tested out of the first 12 months of the 18 month long program and started his studies directly in the Professional Guitar Program, which allowed him to finish the courses in only six months. In 2004, Lobel was hired to play guitar on Jesse McCartney's Beautiful Soul Tour which led to the opportunity for him to co-write and perform 11 of the 12 songs on Jesse McCartney's 2006 album Right Where You Want Me (Hollywood Records), which debuted at number 15 on the U.S. Billboard 200, scoring top 10 spots in Europe and Asia.

Lobel has performed all over the world playing for multi-platinum selling artists including, Jesse McCartney, Enrique Iglesias and the Backstreet Boys. He has played on television shows including The Tonight Show with Jay Leno, Good Morning America, MTV's Total Request Live, The View, Ellen, Regis & Kelly, U-Pick Live, All That, Access Hollywood, and The Megan Mullally Show. As a composer and songwriter he has worked for companies such as NBC, Sony, Hollywood Records and EMI.

As of 2024, Dory is the musical director and lead guitarist for The Voice.

== Personal life ==
Before achieving success with his musical career in the United States, Lobel had planned to one day return to Israel to study psychology and philosophy at Tel Aviv University. When he is not touring, Lobel works full-time in Los Angeles as a songwriter/producer and currently lives in Hollywood where his studio is located.
