= The Movement (production team) =

American songwriting and music production duo

- Also known as: JB & Corron
- Origin: Los Angeles, California, United States
- Genres: Hip hop, pop, R&B, soul
- Occupation: Record producers
- Years active: 2000–present
- Members: James Bunton; Corron Cole

The Movement is an American songwriting and record production duo from Los Angeles, formed in 2000 and composed of James Bunton and Corron Cole. The two signed with Tricky Stewart's RedZone Entertainment in 2007 and gained major commercial success producing the hit songs "Leavin'" by Jesse McCartney and "One Time" by Justin Bieber.

== Career ==
The Los Angeles-based team, consisting of James Bunton and Corron Cole, came together in 2000 and formed The Movement. The duo's creative chemistry landed The Movement its first major break in 2004 working with Bad Boy Records rapper Mase on the single "Welcome Back". The pair also fielded projects by Lloyd ("Hey Young Girl") and Chingy ("Can't Hate Her"), among other acts between 2004 and 2007.

In 2007, The Movement signed with manager Mark Stewart of the Atlanta-based Red Zone Entertainment, and was recruited to work with Hollywood Records' Jesse McCartney. The result — McCartney's hit song "Leavin'" from his 2008 Departure album. The Movement went on to write and produce projects for Lionel Richie ("Good Morning"), Pleasure P ("Birthday Suit"), and Marié Digby ("Love With a Stranger"). In 2009, they had a major hit with Justin Bieber's song "One Time".

In 2008, The Movement left Red Zone Entertainment and worked with Jesse McCartney, Jordin Sparks, The Charlies, and Hollywood Records.

== Discography ==
Date	Artist	Song title	Label	Album
2022	NCT 127	Designer	SM Entertainment	2 Baddies
2012	Jesse McCartney	"Tonight Is Your Night"	Hollywood	Have It All
November 2009	Justin Bieber	"One Time"	Def Jam	My World
September 2009	Marié Digby	"Fool On Parade"	Hollywood	Breathing Underwater
September 2009	Marié Digby	"Love With A Stranger"	Hollywood	Breathing Underwater
June 2009	Pleasure P	"Birthday Suit"	Atlantic	The Intro Of Marcus Cooper
May 2009	Lionel Richie	"Good Morning"	Def Jam	Just Go
April 2009	Jesse McCartney	"Body Language"	Hollywood	Departure / Recharged
April 2009	Jesse McCartney	"In My Veins"	Hollywood	Departure / Recharged
September 2008	Colby O'Donis	"The Difference"	Geffen	Colby O'Donis
June 2008	Prima J	"Rockstar"	Geffen	Prima J
May 2008	Jesse McCartney	"Leavin'"	Hollywood	Departure
April 2007	Teairra Mari	"No No"	Fo' Reel +	
October 2006	Brooke Valentine	"Pimped Out"	Virgin	Physical Education
September 2006	Chingy	"Can't Hate Her"	Capitol	
August 2006	3LW	"Hot"	So So Def	Point of No Return
April 2006	Keke Palmer	"All My Girlz"	Atlantic	Akeelah & The Bee
December 2005	Olivia Feat. 50 Cent	"Cloud 9"	G Unit	
August 2004	Mase	"Welcome Back"	Bad Boy	Welcome Back
August 2004	Mase	"Gotta Survive"	Bad Boy	Welcome Back
August 2004	Mase	"Harlem Lullaby"	Bad Boy	Welcome Back
August 2004	Mase	"Do U Remember"	Bad Boy	Welcome Back
July 2004	Lloyd	"Hey Young Girl"	Murder Inc.	South Side
June 2002	Novel	"Peaches"	Rawkus	
