= Body Language (Jesse McCartney song) =

Single by Jesse McCartney featuring T-Pain

from the album Departure: Recharged
- Released: September 8, 2009
- Length: 3:39 (album version); 3:42 (single version)
- Label: Hollywood
- Songwriters: Jesse McCartney; James Bunton; Corron Ty Cole
- Producer: The Movement

Jesse McCartney singles chronology
"How Do You Sleep?" (2009)	"Body Language" (2009)	"Shake" (2010)

T-Pain singles chronology
"Money Round Here" (2009)	"Body Language" (2009)	"Imagínate" (2009)

"Body Language" is Jesse McCartney's fourth and final single from his album Departure.

== Release ==
While touring in mid-2009, McCartney announced "Body Language" as his next single followed by the singles, "It's Over" and "How Do You Sleep?". A remix featuring T-Pain was also released.

== Release and composition ==
The single version featuring T-Pain became available as a digital download on September 8, 2009. It was sent to U.S. radio on the same day.

== Versions ==
- "Body Language (without T-Pain)" – 3:39
- "Body Language (feat. T-Pain)" – 3:42
- Body Language (Element Club - No Rap) 6:35
- Body Language (Element Club) [feat. T-Pain] 6:55
- Body Language (Bimbo Jones Dub) 6:40
- Body Language (Element Extended Radio Edit - No Rap) 4:53
- Body Language (Element Radio Edit) 4:34
- Body Language (Element Extended Radio Edit) [feat. T-Pain] 5:22
- Body Language (DJ Mike Cruz Tribal Vox Mix [No Drop]) 8:31
- Body Language (DJ Mike Cruz Tribal Vox (No Drop Mix)) 8:16
- Body Language (DJ Mike Cruz Dubamental) 8:31
- Body Language (DJ Mike Cruz Radio Edit) 4:31
- Body Language (with T-Pain) (Video) - 3:50

== Chart performance ==
The song debuted on the Billboard Hot 100 chart of September 19, 2009, at number 84. On October 24, 2009, the song re-entered at number 71, and eventually peaked at number 35 on the chart. The song has been certified Platinum by the Recording Industry Association of America for equivalent sales of 1,000,000 units in the United States.

== Charts ==
Chart (2009)	Peak position
Canada (Canadian Hot 100)	78
US Billboard Hot 100	35
US Pop Airplay (Billboard)	23
US Dance Club Songs (Billboard)	10

== Certifications ==
Region	Certification	Certified units/sales
New Zealand (RMNZ)	Gold	15,000^{‡}
United States (RIAA)	Platinum	1,000,000^{‡}
^{‡} Sales+streaming figures based on certification alone.
