= Radio Disney Music Award for Best Male Artist =

Annual US music award

The following is a list of Radio Disney Music Award winners and nominees for Best Male Artist.

== Winners and nominees ==
=== 2000s ===
Year	Winner	Nominees	Ref.
2001	Aaron Carter	Bow Wow; Lil' Romeo	
2002	Aaron Carter	Bow Wow; Lil' Romeo	
2003	Lil' Romeo	Bow Wow; Aaron Carter	
2004	Usher	Lil' Romeo; Justin Timberlake	
2005	Jesse McCartney	Lil' Romeo; Justin Timberlake	
2006	Jesse McCartney	Chris Brown; Bow Wow; Billie Joe Armstrong	
2007	Jesse McCartney	Corbin Bleu; Justin Timberlake; Zac Efron	

=== 2010s ===
Year	Winner	Nominees	Ref.
2013	Justin Bieber	Cody Simpson; Austin Mahone; Bruno Mars	
2014	Justin Timberlake	Cody Simpson; Austin Mahone	
2015	Ed Sheeran	Nick Jonas; Pharrell Williams	
2016	Ed Sheeran	Justin Bieber; Nick Jonas; Shawn Mendes	
2017	Niall Horan	Bruno Mars; Justin Bieber; Nick Jonas; Shawn Mendes	
2018	Unrealized, only Best Artist		
