= In Technicolor =

Studio album by Jesse McCartney
- Released: July 22, 2014
- Recorded: 2013–2014
- Genre: Pop; disco; funk; blue-eyed soul; R&B
- Length: 35:52
- Label: Eight0Eight; Fontana
- Producer: The Elev3n; Troy "R8DIO" Johnson; Jesse McCartney (exec.); Sherry Goffin Kondor (exec.)

Jesse McCartney chronology
Departure (2008)	In Technicolor (2014)	New Stage (2021)

Singles from In Technicolor
- 1. "Back Together" Released: August 13, 2013; 2. "Superbad" Released: May 6, 2014; 3. "Punch Drunk Recreation" Released: November 19, 2014

In Technicolor is the fourth studio album by American recording artist Jesse McCartney. This album marks his return to music after the shelved effort of Have It All. Before the release of this album, McCartney released an extended play, In Technicolor (Part 1), which contained several songs from the album, as a teaser of what fans could expect from his upcoming album.

== Background ==
"This album sort of has a retro flare, and you can hear that throughout the record. It has a lot of that late ’70s, early ’80s pop-funk influence, so Prince, Michael Jackson, Earth, Wind & Fire, they all made an impact on me at a very young age growing up listening to music. So I wanted to make an album that was sort of a reflection of what I grew up listening to."

— McCartney, on the album.

In 2010, McCartney announced he was planning to release his fourth studio album titled Have It All. The first single from the album, "Shake" was released on September 21, 2010. Have It All was then slated for a January 2011 release. McCartney had prepared over 50 songs for the album, ultimately choosing 11 to make the final cut with producers like Sean Garrett, Kevin Rudolf, Ammo, J Cash, and rapper Tyga. The sound of Have It All was aimed at being more mature than his previous 2008 album Departure. However, Have It All was never released. In April 2011, McCartney stated on his Twitter account that the album wouldn't be released until they heard about the outcome of Locke & Key, a television series that he had a lead role in. The following year, McCartney revealed in an interview that Have It All was delayed because of some acting jobs he couldn't turn down as well as many other reasons. McCartney's mother announced that the president of Hollywood Records had retired which delayed the release of the album. In the March 2013 issue of Glamholic magazine, McCartney stated that he was currently writing and producing his fourth studio album and that there would be "lots of new material." On August 13, 2013 a single was released, "Back Together" through McCartney's own new record label, Eight0Eight Records. He chose to leave Hollywood Records because "it made more sense" in this point of his career to release his music on his own. A four-song EP was released on December 10, 2013 titled In Technicolor (Part I). McCartney chose to release an EP before the album to give his fans his new music and to allow time to still finish up his full-length album. In June 2014, Jesse McCartney officially announced the title of his fourth studio album as In Technicolor and set the release date of July 22.

== Release and promotion ==
In Technicolor became available for pre-order through iTunes and Amazon on June 11, 2014. Four days before the album's release, a ballad titled "The Other Guy" was released to MTV exclusively to promote the album. On July 21, 2014 McCartney performed his single "Superbad" on The Today Show. McCartney will embark on a headlining North American concert tour called the In Technicolor Tour. The tour will begin on July 25, 2014 in Charlotte, N.C. and will end on September 4 in Anaheim, CA. In Technicolor was released on July 22, 2014 through Eight0Eight Records. Upon release, In Technicolor reached the top 20 albums on iTunes Top Albums chart.

== Critical reception ==
Upon release, In Technicolor received mostly positive reviews. USA Today gave the album three out of four stars stating that "McCartney flaunts his love of pop-soul without apology" which results in "an easy, breezy collection that some more presumptuous former tween idols would do well to study" and labeled "Tie the Knot" and "All About Us" as the standout tracks. Jason Scott from Pop Dust rated the album 4/5. He wrote that McCartney's "smooth and jazz-fused vocals" helped move him "from a simple heartthrob to legitimate musician" and compared the style of the album to those of Bruno Mars and Justin Timberlake.

Allmusic.com gave the album an 80 out of 100, stating "McCartney focuses on tight little pop songs, emphasizing hooks and feel over dance" and compared the album to Justin Timberlake's 2013 release The 20/20 Experience, and Michael Jackson pop style.

== Commercial performance ==
In Technicolor debuted at No. 35 on the Billboard 200 and No. 7 on the Independent Albums chart, selling 7,846 copies in its first week.

== Track listing ==
In Technicolor — Standard edition
No.	Title	Writer(s)	Producer(s)	Length
1.	"In Technicolor, Pt. I"	Jesse McCartney; James G. Morales; Matt Morales; Julio David Rodriguez; Shane Stevens	The Elev3n	1:41
2.	"Back Together"	McCartney; Nash Overstreet; Ryan Follese; J. Morales; M. Morales; Rodriguez	The Elev3n, Jesse McCartney	3:44
3.	"Young Love"	McCartney; Overstreet; Follese; J. Morales; M. Morales; Rodriguez	The Elev3n	3:22
4.	"Superbad"	McCartney; J. Morales; M. Morales; Rodriguez; Stevens; Autumn Rowe; Nikola Bedingfield	The Elev3n, Jesse McCartney	2:57
5.	"All About Us"	McCartney; Jared Cotter; J. Morales; M. Morales; Rodriguez	The Elev3n	3:43
6.	"Checkmate"	McCartney; Troy	R8DIO	3:30
7.	"Punch Drunk Recreation"	McCartney; Johnston; Merritt	R8DIO	3:10
8.	"Goodie Bag"	McCartney; J. Morales; M. Morales; Rodriguez; Rowe; Stevens	The Elev3n	3:00
9.	"In Technicolor, Pt. II"	McCartney; J. Morales; M. Morales; Rodriguez; David Quinones; Stevens	The Elev3n	3:42
10.	"Tie the Knot"	McCartney; Cotter; J. Morales; M. Morales; Rodriguez	The Elev3n	3:24
11.	"The Other Guy"	McCartney; J. Morales; M. Morales; Rodriguez; Rachel Rabin; Lazonate Franklin; Sherry Goffin Kondor	Jesse McCartney; Sherry Goffin Kondor	3:39
Total length:				35:52

In Technicolor — Digital reissue edition (bonus track)
No.	Title	Writer(s)	Length
12.	"So Cool"	Alex Jacke; Gabrielle Nowee; Jesse McCartney; Philip Stewart	3:27
Total length:			39:19

In Technicolor — Target deluxe edition (bonus track)
No.	Title	Length
13.	"Catch and Release"	3:26
Total length:		42:45

== Personnel ==
- Katisse Buckingham – alto saxophone, tenor saxophone
- James Casey – tenor saxophone
- The Elev3n – drum programming
- Juliet Haffner – viola
- Robbie Kondor – piano, string arrangements
- Jesse McCartney – lead vocals, background vocals
- James G. Morales – drums, percussion
- Matt Morales – horn arrangements, trumpet
- Troy "R8DIO" Johnson – drum programming, keyboards, synthesizer
- Amy Ralske – cello
- Julio David Rodriguez – bass guitar, acoustic guitar, electric guitar

== Charts ==
Chart performance for In Technicolor
Chart (2014)	Peak position
US Billboard 200	35
US Billboard Independent Albums	7
