= Right Where You Want Me (song) =

Single by Jesse McCartney

from the album Right Where You Want Me
- Released: 26 August 2006 (Australia); 5 September 2006 (U.S.); 2 October 2006 (UK)
- Recorded: 2006
- Genre: Pop rock
- Length: 3:32 (Album Version); 3:05 (Radio Edit)
- Label: Hollywood
- Songwriters: Andy Dodd; Dory Lobel; Jesse McCartney; Adam Watts
- Producers: Andy Dodd; Adam Watts

Jesse McCartney singles chronology
"Because You Live" (2005)	"Right Where You Want Me" (2006)	"Just So You Know" (2007)

"Right Where You Want Me" was the lead single released in the U.S. from Jesse McCartney's second album of the same name. It was used as the title song for the Disney Channel Original Movie Return to Halloweentown, and is also featured in the video game Thrillville: Off the Rails.

On August 3, 2006, McCartney brought the world premiere of this music video to TRL.

== Radio Disney Edit ==
McCartney recorded an edited version of the song for Radio Disney and it is featured on Radio Disney Jams, Vol. 9. He performed at the Radio Disney 10th Birthday Concert. The slightly suggestive lines, please don't take your time was replaced to you've been on my mind and Baby don't be gentle. I can handle anything. to Girl don't keep me waiting. Now's the time to get away.. Major edits were in the 1st and 2nd verses, and also the bridge of the song:

- Need to lose control to Need to just let go.
- Played it slow to Let it flow.
- Girl, I'm gonna let you have your way with me to Girl, There's something about you that I can't explain.
- When you move like that it's hard to breathe to I wouldn't have it any other way.
- Trying to keep my body still to can't believe this feeling's real.

== Lyrics ==
The lyrics of the song tells about a man who is wooing a woman, and a man asks her to take things slowly to get to know each other well.

== Music video ==
The video features Jesse following a lady, along with clips of him in the recording studio with his band. In the end, the video features both of them driving cars at the same time with them smiling at each other, hinting a mutual attraction to each other. The video was directed by Big TV, and received heavy rotation on MTV, VH1, Nickelodeon, and Disney Channel. However, Disney Channel removed the scenes with Jesse and the lady, and instead aired two versions that features Jesse in the recording studio with his band. The first version features Return to Halloweentown clips and the second version aired without the movie clips. The first version was heavily played on the channel in 2006, as it was the theme song of Return To Halloweentown, and it promoted both the movie and the song on Radio Disney, making stay on its Top 30 countdown throughout 2006. The second version can only be seen on Disney.com.

== Formats and track listing ==
CD 1

1. "Right Where You Want Me" (Album Version) 3:32
2. "Running Away" - 3:32

CD 2

1. "Right Where You Want Me" (Radio Edit) 3:05
2. "Feels Like Sunday" - 3:48
3. "We Can Go Anywhere" - 3:35
4. Right Where You Want Me (Radio Disney Edit) (3:05)

Hidden Track Remixes

1. "Right Where You Want Me" [Eddie Joe Vocal Edit]
2. "Right Where You Want Me" [Adam Code Club Dance Remix]
3. "Right Where You Want Me" [Adam Code Karaoke Remix]

Official Versions

1. Official/Radio Edit- 3:05
2. Album Version- 3:32
3. Radio Disney Edit- 3:03

== Charts performance ==
The song debuted on the Billboard Hot 100 chart of December 11, 2006, at number 67. The song eventually peaked at number 33 on the chart and becoming 2nd top 40 song in the country.

== Charts ==
Chart (2006)	Peak position
Australia (ARIA)	20
Belgium (Ultratip Bubbling Under Flanders)	9
France (SNEP)	24
Italy (FIMI)	6
New Zealand (Recorded Music NZ)	30
Portugal (AFP)	19
Scotland Singles (OCC)	29
Spain (Promusicae)	17
Switzerland (Schweizer Hitparade)	72
UK Singles (OCC)	54
US Billboard Hot 100	33
US Pop Airplay (Billboard)	31

== Release history ==
Release dates and formats for "Right Where You Want Me"
Region	Date	Format	Label(s)	Ref.
United States	July 24, 2006	Mainstream airplay	Hollywood	
