= Just So You Know (Jesse McCartney song) =

Single by Jesse McCartney

from the album Right Where You Want Me
- Released: December 7, 2006 (Australia)
- Recorded: 2006
- Genre: Pop rock
- Length: 3:53
- Label: Hollywood; EMI
- Songwriters: Jesse McCartney; Adam Watts; Andy Dodd; Dory Lobel
- Producers: Andy Dodd; Adam Watts

Jesse McCartney singles chronology
"Right Where You Want Me" (2007)	"Just So You Know" (2006)	"Leavin'" (2008)

"Just So You Know" was the second and final single released from Jesse McCartney's second album, Right Where You Want Me. The single was written by McCartney, Adam Watts, Andy Dodd and Dory Lobel, and was never released in the U.S., due to lack of support from Jesse's record label, according to an email from his manager. The single and its accompanying video tell the story about a boy who is in love with another guy's girlfriend.

In Australia, the video premiered on various music video shows such as Rage and Video Hits, but has failed to enter the charts. An SMS voting-based system on Video Hits determined what version of the music video viewers would prefer to be played: a hug or kiss ending. The 'kiss' video won but was never again played on the show. A simple hug was shown at the ending of the video. The single received light radio play on Perth's Nova 93.7 and Sydney's Nova 96.9. The single was available in digital download form or from his second album Right Where You Want Me and has never been released as a physical single. McCartney recorded a French version of the song called "De Toi À Moi" (literally "From You to Me"). It was released in June as a bonus track on the French version of his third studio album "Departure". It received heavy airplay in Canada on The Family Channel.

== Track listing ==
Australia & Europe Single

1. Just So You Know (Radio Edit) 3:30
2. Just So You Know (Album Version) 3:53
3. Just So You Know (Video) 3:46

== Charts ==
Chart (2007)	Peak position
Belgium (Ultratip Bubbling Under Flanders)	12
Canada (Hot Canadian Digital Singles)	73
Germany (GfK)	90
Italy (FIMI)	8
