= All's Well (EP) =

EP by Jesse McCartney
- Released: April 5, 2024
- Recorded: 2022
- Genre: Pop
- Length: 12:30
- Label: Blue Suit
- Producer: Morgan Taylor Reid; Jesse McCartney (exec.); Eleven; Andrew Dixon; Diamond Pistols

Jesse McCartney chronology
New Stage (2021)	All's Well (2024)

Singles from All's Well
- 1. "Faux Fur" Released: January 24, 2024; 2. "Make A Baby" Released: March 1, 2024

All's Well is the fourth extended play by American singer Jesse McCartney. It was released on April 5, 2024, by Blue Suit Records. The EP marks the artist's first release of original music since the COVID-19 pandemic, and following his previous album New Stage.

== Background ==
In 2019, McCartney stated "As I get older I do understand and realize what the important things are in life because trying to juggle a personal and professional life can be complicated.". But due to the COVID-19 pandemic McCartney had to take a step back from everything he was gearing up for, but what helped him in this new stage of life was his then fiancé Katie Peterson

"The COVID-19 pandemic marked a dark period in his life, as it did for many people. This project became an outlet to share those feelings and an opportunity to connect deeper with his audience."

— Piper, on the release.

McCartney self described this release as "a collection of songs I've been working on over the last year." and admitted his admiration to old school '70s pop as his inspiration. Though much like his previous release, he cites his wife as a key influence as he continues entering new stages in his life.

== Singles ==
"Faux Fur", "a retro R&B groove and funk, layered with soulful vocals" was released as the first single on January 24, 2024. The track ended on Rolling Stone Magazine's "Songs You Need To Know" list.

The second single, "Make A Baby" (featuring Yung Gravy), was released on March 1, 2024.

== Critical reception ==
The EP received generally positive reviews from music critics. Martina Rebecca Inchingolo from ABC News reviewed the release as his music is aging like "fine wine" and his way of communicating his experiences through his music is his best way possible. Ending the review stating "short but sweet EP that celebrates life, love, and lust."

Emily Piper from Technique stated "McCartney has always been a strong force in the music industry, and 'All's Well' only supports his claim to fame. This project is a reflection of the maturity and experiences he achieved across his life. Whether in the darkness or light, there is a song to speak to everyone and a story to unify its listeners."

The Sun described the release as "a fun, supple and fascinating step on the multi-talented multi-hyphenate's journey of expressing a true self beyond the expectations and demands — equal parts vintage Hall and Oates, postmodern swag, and honeymoon sincerity packaged in that undeniable McCartney charm."

== Promotion ==
A US tour to promote the release began on April 12, 2024, and ended on May 16.

== Track listing ==
All tracks are written by Jesse McCartney with others noted.

All's Well track listing
No.	Title	Writer(s)	Producer(s)	Length
1.	"Faux Fur"	Paul Daniel; Solomon Fox	Andrew Dixon; Morgan Taylor Reid	2:14
2.	"Make a Baby" (featuring Yung Gravy)	Yung Gravy; Diamond Pistols; Matt Morales; James G. Morales; Geo Ponce; Dan Heing	Diamond Pistols; Eleven	2:10
3.	"Silver Spoons"	Josh Grant; Nicole "Kole" Cohen	Dixon; Reid	3:31
4.	"The Well"	Reid	Reid	2:54
5.	"Make a Baby" (Solo Version)	M. Morales; J. Morales; Ponce; Heing	Eleven	1:41
Total length:				12:30
