= How Do You Sleep? (Jesse McCartney song) =

2009 single by Jesse McCartney

Single by Jesse McCartney featuring Ludacris

from the album Departure: Recharged
- Released: January 20, 2009 (remix)
- Recorded: 2007–2008
- Genre: Dance pop; R&B; electropop
- Length: 3:43 (Album Version); 3:18 (Radio Edit); 3:28 (Remix ft/ Ludacris)
- Label: Hollywood
- Songwriters: Sean Garrett; Raymond "Clubba Langg" Oglesby
- Producers: Garrett; Clubba Langg

Jesse McCartney singles chronology
"It's Over" (2008)	"How Do You Sleep?" (2009)	"Body Language" (2009)

Ludacris singles chronology
"Nasty Girl" (2009)	"How Do You Sleep?" (2009)	"Everybody Drunk as Fuck" (2009)

Music video
- "How Do You Sleep? (Duet/Remix)" on YouTube (posted by Hollywood Records)

"How Do You Sleep?" is the third single from Jesse McCartney's third studio album, Departure. The song was originally included on the album's original 2008 release, although it was remixed by American rapper Ludacris and serviced commercially as the lead single for the album's 2009 reissue, Departure: Recharged in January of that year. "How Do You Sleep?" was written and produced by R&B singer Sean Garrett, and his production partner Clubba Langg.

== Critical reception ==
"How Do You Sleep?" received favorable reviews. Billboard gave the song a positive review: "While his previous single 'It's Over' failed to achieve the same success as his No. 1 top 40 hit 'Leavin',' Jesse McCartney keeps the ball rolling with 'How Do You Sleep?' from his 2008 CD Departure. He croons about his lost love, 'It's been about a year now/ Ain't seen or heard from you/Been missing you crazy,' to a twangin' hip-hop beat co-penned and co-produced by R&B master Sean Garrett. R&B and rhythmic stations smart enough to embrace Justin Timberlake would be wise to indulge another white boy, who fuels the fire with remixes featuring Ludacris. McCartney has certainly grown up; now it's time that radio gave this talent his just deserts: sustained stardom." About.com stated, "The beats here give an insistent atmosphere that will make 'How Do You Sleep?' hard to forget and added that with raps from Ludacris adds a great muscular addition to the song."

== Remix ==
An official remix featuring rapper Ludacris was made and sent to radio. This version is also the single version.

McCartney said the following about collaborating with Ludacris: "I've been a fan of Luda's throughout his career and having him on this track was an amazing honor. He's innovative across the board and always brings the freshest lyrics to any track."

There are currently two remixes made, A rhythmic version, which consists of a different instrumentation and a Top 40 version, which uses the original beat.

== Promotion ==
McCartney performed “How Do You Sleep? (Remix)” with Ludacris for the first time on TV on The Ellen DeGeneres Show on April 16, 2009.

== Music video ==
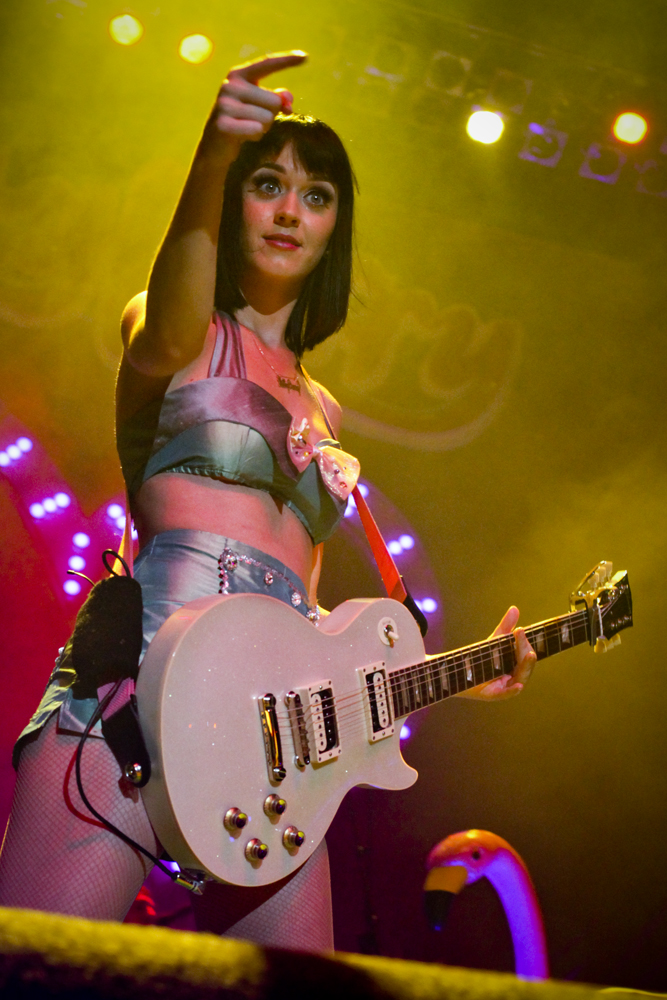
Katy Perry make cameo in both music video of the song.

An official live performance promo video for the single was released on December 18, 2008. It is collected footage from McCartney on tour.

McCartney stated in an interview backstage at B96's Jingle Ball 2008, that the shooting of the official music video for the single started in January 2009. The official video premiered on McCartney's MySpace page on March 3, 2009.

Katy Perry makes a cameo in both videos. In the live video she is seen giving Jesse a hug backstage while in the remix video she only appears on a photograph in Jesse's car.

== Track listing ==
1. "How Do You Sleep?" [Radio Edit] – 3:18
2. "How Do You Sleep?" [Album Version Radio Edit] – 3:22
3. "How Do You Sleep?" [Album Version] – 3:43
4. "How Do You Sleep?" [Main Version] – 3:32 (featuring Ludacris)
5. "How Do You Sleep?" [Rhythmic Radio Mix] – 3:48 (featuring Ludacris)
6. "How Do You Sleep?" [Rhythmic Radio Mix – No Rap] – 3:28
7. "How Do You Sleep?" [Bonus Video]

== Charts performance ==
The original version debuted at number 125 on the Bubbling Under Hot 100 Singles. The version with Ludacris debuted on the Billboard Hot 100 chart of February 21, 2009, at number 94. The song eventually peaked at number 26 on the chart and becoming his 4th top 40 song in the country.

== Charts ==
=== Original version ===
Chart (2008–2009)	Peak position
US Bubbling Under Hot 100 Singles	25

=== Single remix ===
Chart (2009–2010)	Peak position
Australia (ARIA)	75
Canada Hot 100 (Billboard)	40
US Billboard Hot 100	26
US Pop Airplay (Billboard)	7
US Adult Pop Airplay (Billboard)	30

=== Year-end charts ===
Chart (2009)	Rank
US Billboard Hot 100	86
US Mainstream Top 40	38

== Release history ==
Release dates and formats for "How Do You Sleep?"
Region	Date	Format	Label(s)	Ref.
United States	January 20, 2009	Mainstream airplay	Hollywood	
