= Leavin' (Jesse McCartney song) =

2008 single by Jesse McCartney

Single by Jesse McCartney

from the album Departure
- Released: March 10, 2008
- Genre: Pop
- Length: 3:38
- Label: Hollywood
- Songwriters: Christopher "Tricky" Stewart; Terius Nash; James Bunton; Corron Ty Cole
- Producers: Christopher "Tricky" Stewart; The-Dream

Jesse McCartney singles chronology
"Just So You Know" (2006)	"Leavin'" (2008)	"It's Over" (2008)

Music video
- "Leavin'" on YouTube (posted by Hollywood Records)

"Leavin'" is a song by American singer-songwriter Jesse McCartney, released as the lead single from McCartney's third studio album Departure (2008). Written and produced by Tricky Stewart and The-Dream, with additional writing by James Bunton and Corron Ty Cole, "Leavin'" was sent to U.S. mainstream radios on March 10, 2008.

Namesake of the album's title, "Leavin'" was considered a departure from McCartney's youthful image in favor of adult-oriented subject matter, vocal delivery and production. Lyrically, the song finds McCartney admiring a female's backside with plans to steal her from her current beau. Sonically, the song is pop with an electro production style and sound effects from digital watches, alarm clocks and kitchen timers. Its music video shows the singer admiring a model before kissing her at the end.

"Leavin'" remains McCartney's biggest hit single in the United States, reaching number one on the Billboard Mainstream Top 40 chart and peaking within the top 10 of the Billboard Hot 100; it sold over three million digital downloads and received triple platinum certification by Recording Industry Association of America (RIAA). Worldwide, it entered the top 20 in Canada and Scotland.

== Background and release ==
After achieving a younger audience with his first two albums, Beautiful Soul (2004) and Right Where You Want Me (2006), Jesse McCartney announced that his third studio album "gonna be a shock to a lot of people," saying: "Sonically, it will sound like a 2007 record but with that '80s bigness to it. People won't even realize who is singing some of these songs." He also revealed that the album is "certainly a little bit more urban-influenced, I worked with people really well known in that area of music, they gonna see a lot of growth, obviously with the first single."

"Leavin'" was first released on radio, on March 10, 2008. Later, the single was released on April 22, 2008, following the UK release on June 9, 2008. On August 26, 2008, an acoustic version of the song was made available on iTunes and other outlets. The acoustic version was sung by McCartney with Rich Berra of the Johnjay and Rich Morning Show, a radio show broadcast across Arizona, Portland and Colorado Springs. Proceeds from the downloads benefitted the radio duo's Christmas Wish Foundation or CWF.

== Composition ==
"Leavin'" was written and produced by Christopher "Tricky" Stewart and The-Dream, while James Button and Corron Ty Cole co-wrote the track and Kuk Harrell produced McCartney's vocals. The song is considered a departure from McCartney's old style of teen pop, with a more urban-influenced sound. "Leavin'" is a pop song, with electro production. Written in the key of A major, it has a tempo of 79.255 beats per minute, with McCartney's vocals spanning from the low-note of E4 to the high-note of C6. Lyrically, "Leavin'" sees the singer eyeing a female's backside with plans to steal her from her current beau.

The song starts with stabbing, near-industrial beats. Radio Disney played the song with a few edits, changing the line, "Man, that thing you got behind you is amazin'" to "Man, the way you make me feel is so amazing", and "take you out and let it rain" to "turn around and look again". It is featured on Radio Disney Jams, Vol. 11.

== Critical reception ==
"Leavin'" received generally favorable reviews from music critics. Nick Levine of Digital Spy gave the song 4 out of 5 stars, writing that 'Leavin' "is the musical equivalent of McCartney's first tuft of chest hair, a hard-edged crunk gem that wouldn't sound out of place on an Usher or Chris Brown album. Combining smooth, radio-friendly choruses with trendy electro production from Tricky and The Dream, it makes McCartney sound fresh and a little bit sexy without scaring off the milk 'n' cookies brigade."

Stephen Thomas Erlewine of Allmusic picked the song as a standout track on Departure. Gian F. of The Muse's Muse praised the track, writing that "it gives you a glimpse into the more refined, confident, and aggressive Jesse who showcases increased ranged and improved vocal agility." Alex Macpherson of The Guardian called it a "sharp crunk song with fantastic hook." However, Graham Drummond of Click Music called it "over-produced and lacking any lyrical value."

== Chart performance ==
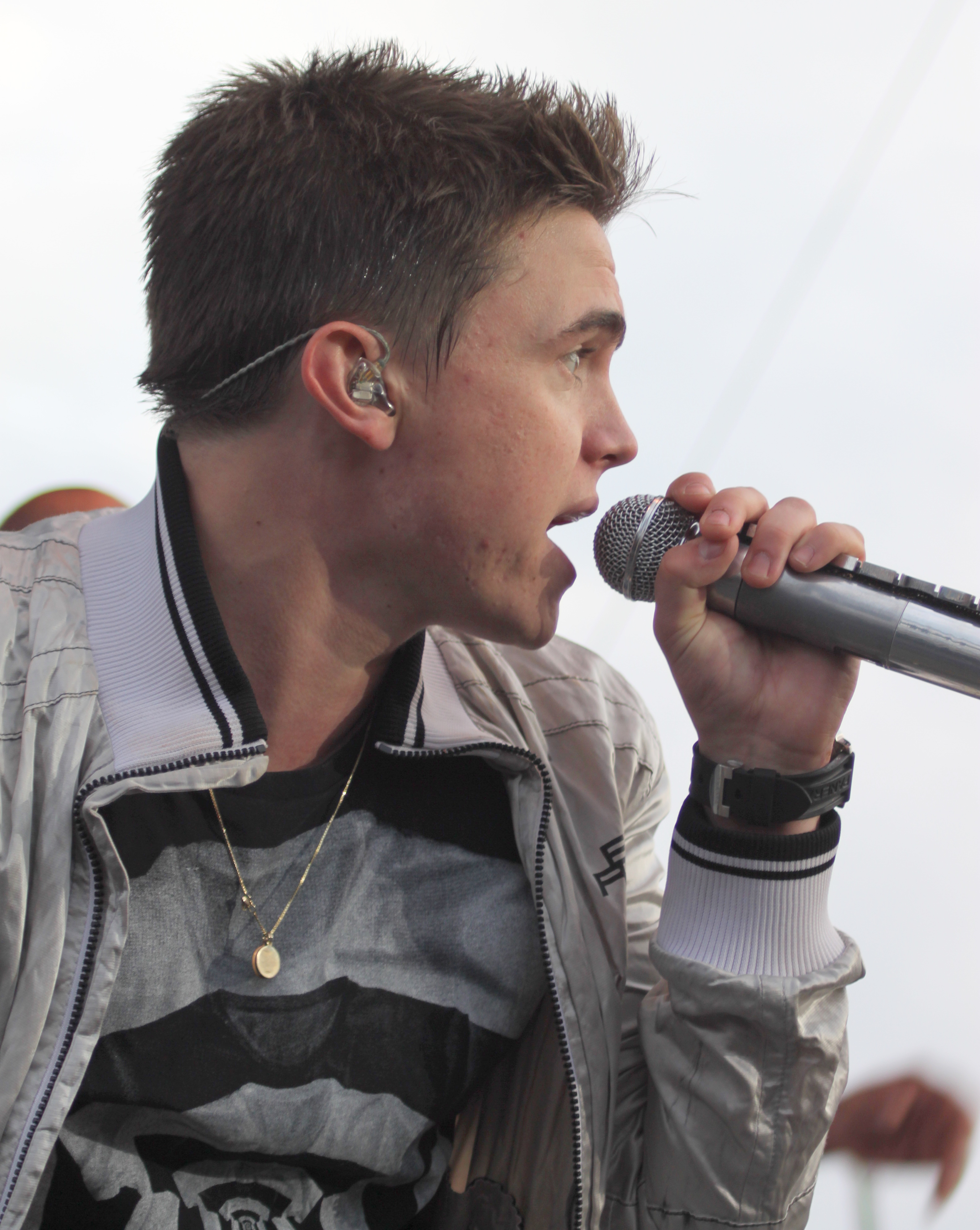
McCartney performing "Leavin'" in 2009.

"Leavin'" debuted at number 14 on the Billboard Hot 100 chart of May 10, 2008, making it McCartney's highest debut on the chart and highest charting-single of his career. In its second week, the song rose to number 10, becoming his first and only top-10 hit in the United States. It stayed at its peak position for three non-consecutive weeks. The song managed to top the Pop Airplay chart; his first and only number-one and second top-10 single. On the Billboard Pop 100, the song peaked at number 2, while it also topped the Hot Dance Club Songs chart. "Leavin'" also managed to peak at number-one (remaining at the top for six consecutive weeks) on American Top 40 hosted by Ryan Seacrest. "Leavin'" holds the record for spending the second most weeks at No. 1 in 2008 on the American Top 40 behind Leona Lewis' "Bleeding Love" which was also co-written by Jesse McCartney. The song has been certified 3xPlatinum by the Recording Industry Association of America for equivalent sales of 3,000,000 units in the United States.

Elsewhere, "Leavin'" charted moderately, only reaching the top 20 in Canada. In France, "Leavin'" peaked at number 32, while in Australia, it debuted and peaked at number 49, remaining on the ARIA Charts only for one week, becoming his lowest charting-single there. In the United Kingdom, it reached number 48 on the UK Singles Chart, while in Netherlands, it performed poorly at number 97.

== Music video ==
Tommy2 confirmed that the music video for "Leavin" was shot on February 17, 2008, and was directed by Sanji, who also directed his "She's No You" video. The video premiered on March 7, 2008.

It begins with Jesse and a lady played by the actress Niki Huey sitting in the chairs opposite each other. Jesse is wearing an unbuttoned shirt and she is wearing a long-sleeved shirt and panties. After staring at each other, Niki gets up and climbs suggestively onto Jesse's lap. The second verse has Jesse wearing only pants and Niki is wearing a bra and underwear, rolling around, frolicking on a mattress. The video ends with Jesse and Niki are kissing in the car. Throughout the chorus, Jesse is shown in a bluish-white room.

== Formats and track listings ==
Australian CD – single

1. "Leavin'" (Single Version)
2. "Leavin'" (The Bimbo Jones Radio Edit)
3. "Leavin'" (MSTRKRFT Remix)

EU iTunes Download 1 – EP

1. "Leavin'" (Radio Edit)
2. "Oxygen"
3. "Think About It"

EU iTunes Download 2 – Single

1. "Leavin" (Album Version)
2. "Bleeding Love"

EU iTunes Download 3 – Single

1. "Leavin" (Radio Edit)
2. "Leavin" (The Bimbo Jones Radio Edit)

UK CD – Single

1. "Leavin'"
2. "Leavin'" (The Bimbo Jones Radio Edit)

UK iTunes Download 1 – Single

1. "Leavin'" (Radio Edit)
2. "Leavin'" (MSTRKRFT Remix)

UK iTunes Download 2 – Single

1. "Leavin'" (The Bimbo Jones Radio Edit)

UK iTunes Download 3 – EP

1. "Leavin'" (Radio Edit)
2. "Bleeding Love"
3. "Leavin'" (Ralph Rosario Radio Edit)
4. "Leavin'" (Albert C Reggaeton Radio Mix)

UK iTunes Download 4 – EP

1. "Leavin'"(Album Version)
2. "Leavin'" (MSTRKRFT Remix)
3. "Leavin'" (Video Download)

== Charts ==
=== Weekly charts ===
Chart (2008–2009)	Peak position
Australia (ARIA)	49
Canada Hot 100 (Billboard)	16
Canada CHR/Top 40 (Billboard)	4
Canada Hot AC (Billboard)	9
France (SNEP)	32
Ireland (IRMA)	47
Netherlands (Dutch Top 40 Tipparade)	18
Netherlands (Single Top 100)	97
Romania (Romanian Top 100)	17
Scottish Singles Sales (Official Charts)	15
UK Singles (Official Charts)	48
US Billboard Hot 100	10
US Adult Pop Airplay (Billboard)	21
US Dance Club Songs (Billboard)	1
US Dance Airplay (Billboard)	18
US Pop Airplay (Billboard)	1
US Rhythmic Airplay (Billboard)	22

=== Year-end charts ===
Chart (2008)	Position
Canada (Canadian Hot 100)	56
Canada CHR/Top 40 (Billboard)	17
US Billboard Hot 100	28
US Hot Dance Club Play (Billboard)	35
US Mainstream Top 40 (Billboard)	2

== Certifications ==
Region	Certification	Certified units/sales
United States (RIAA)	3× Platinum	3,000,000^{‡}
^{‡} Sales+streaming figures based on certification alone.
