= Shake (Jesse McCartney song) =

2010 song by Jesse McCartney

Single by Jesse McCartney
- Released: September 21, 2010
- Recorded: 2010
- Genre: Pop; R&B
- Length: 3:10
- Label: Hollywood
- Songwriters: Jesse McCartney; Jacob Kasher Hindlin; Joshua Coleman
- Producer: Ammo

Jesse McCartney singles chronology
"Body Language" (2009)	"Shake" (2010)	"One Night" (2010)

Music video
- "Shake" on YouTube

"Shake" is the original lead single from American singer and actor Jesse McCartney's canceled fourth studio album, Have It All. It was written by McCartney, Jacob Kasher Hindlin, and written and produced by Joshua Coleman. It was sent to both U.S. mainstream radios and released in digital download format on September 21, 2010.

== Writing and inspiration ==
"Shake" is written by Jesse McCartney and Jacob Kasher and produced by Joshua Coleman. In an interview with MTV, McCartney described,"I'm really excited about 'Shake.' We decided that would be the first single to represent Have It All and ... I felt like that song was kind of the closest to [2008's] Departure and it was a way to sort of reacquaint the fans with my music." and "It's a kind of ... urban, kitschy track with a lot of synths and pop melodies on top, and it makes for good ear candy."

== Promotion ==
He performed this single on October 19, on Live! with Regis and Kelly and it was included in game for iPhone and iPod Touch, Tap Tap Revenge 3.

== Music video ==
The music video for "Shake" was filmed on October 26, 2010. The video is directed by Toben Seymour and choreographed Flii Stylz. In an interview, Jesse told MTV, "It's gonna be cool. We wanted to create a video that wasn't necessarily a story, following the song. It didn't necessarily have to be on the nose. We wanted something that was visually stimulating, a lot of cool camera techniques that haven't been used, a lot of saturated colors and even a lot of ladies with beautiful features." The music video was premiered on E! News and E! Online on November 16, 2010.

== Formats and track listings ==
US iTunes Download

1. "Shake" (radio version)
2. "Shake" (video)

== Charts performance ==
The song debuted on the Billboard Hot 100 chart of October 9, 2010, at number 90. On October 30, 2010, the song re-entered at number 78, and eventually peaked at number 54 on the chart.

== Charts ==
Chart (2010–11)	Peak position
US Billboard Hot 100	54
US Pop Airplay (Billboard)	17

== Release history ==
Region	Date	Format
United States	September 21, 2010	Digital download
United States	September 21, 2010	Mainstream radio
