= It's Over (Jesse McCartney song) =

Single by Jesse McCartney

from the album Departure
- Released: August 25, 2008
- Recorded: 2007–2008
- Genre: Pop, R&B
- Length: 4:10 (album version); 3:51 (radio edit)
- Label: Hollywood
- Songwriters: B. Seals-Kennedy; The Clutch; E. Lewis; B. Muhammad; C. Nelson; P. Smith
- Producers: Brian Kennedy, The Clutch

Jesse McCartney singles chronology
"Leavin'" (2008)	"It's Over" (2008)	"How Do You Sleep?" (2009)

Music video
- "It's Over" on YouTube (posted by Hollywood Records)

"It's Over" is the second overall single from singer Jesse McCartney's third studio album, Departure. McCartney confirmed that "It's Over" is the second single when he made an appearance on Good Day Sacramento on August 5, he also confirmed it on 107.9 KDND radio, the same day. Jesse McCartney's Authorized Promotion Team (JMPT) also confirmed this on August 5 with a MySpace bulletin.

== Music video ==
The music video premiered on Myspace on November 18, 2008.

The music video features McCartney performing the song on-stage with two male back-up dancers in a lounge bar. His on-video love interest is portrayed by actress and model Melissa Ordway. The video shows several memories of McCartney and the girl, and toward the end of the memory she always disappears, a clear homage to Eternal Sunshine of the Spotless Mind. McCartney described the video

You see intermittently throughout the video different scenarios, different set ups, different flash backs, of the good times and the bad, which in a relationship is always the ups and the downs.

== Track listings and formats ==
EP - (EU iTunes Digital Download)

1. "It's Over" (Radio Edit)
2. "It's Over" (Remix aka Gimo Radio Edit)
3. "It's Over" (Club Re-Mix aka Gimo Club Mix)
4. "It's Over" (Single Version)
5. "It's Over" (Video)

== Chart performance ==
The song debuted on the Billboard Hot 100 chart of October 18, 2008, at number 88. The song eventually peaked at number 62 on the chart.

== Charts ==
Chart (2008–09)	Peak position
Canada Hot 100 (Billboard)	98
US Billboard Hot 100	62
US Pop Airplay (Billboard)	22

== Release history ==
Release dates and formats for "It's Over"
Region	Date	Format	Label(s)	Ref.
United States	August 25, 2008	Mainstream airplay	Hollywood	
