= Departure (Jesse McCartney album) =

2008 studio album by Jesse McCartney

Studio album by Jesse McCartney
- Released: May 20, 2008
- Recorded: 2007–2008
- Genres: Pop; dance-pop; electropop; R&B
- Length: 44:59
- Label: Hollywood
- Producers: Sean Garrett; Tricky Stewart; The-Dream; The Movement; The Clutch; Brian Kennedy; Kwamé; Kuya; Clubba Lang; J.R. Rotem; Eric Hudson; MaddScientist

Jesse McCartney chronology
Right Where You Want Me (2006)	Departure (2008)	In Technicolor (2014)

Singles from Departure
- 1. "Leavin'" Released: March 10, 2008; 2. "It's Over" Released: August 25, 2008

Alternative cover
- Departure: Recharged

Singles from Departure: Recharged
- 1. "How Do You Sleep?" Released: January 20, 2009; 2. "Body Language" Released: September 8, 2009

Departure is the third studio album by American singer Jesse McCartney. It was released on May 20, 2008 through Hollywood Records. The album was re-released on April 7, 2009, under the name Departure: Recharged. The album featured a heavier R&B sound, and spawned McCartney’s biggest hit, "Leavin'", and another two US Hot 100 top 40 hits, "How Do You Sleep?", and "Body Language". The latter two were released as singles from the recharged edition.

== Album information ==
It has been described by McCartney as a complete change in musical style compared to his previous releases . About the new album, he said, "I'm shooting for Prince chord changes, Michael [Jackson] melodies, and the bigness of Madonna - fun '80s stuff. That's the best that I can put it".

Departure was re-released under the name Departure: Recharged on April 7, 2009. It includes five brand-new tracks and the remix of "How Do You Sleep?" featuring Ludacris. McCartney said that the five new tracks, including three brand-new compositions, would be available for individual sale online for those who already own Departure. McCartney said the following about the re-release: "I kind of want to rejuvenate the album a little bit and make it fresh again for everyone and make sure if they haven't checked it out yet that they will this time".

The songs, "Leavin", "It's Over", and "How Do You Sleep" were frequently played on Radio Disney. "Leavin" was featured on the Radio Disney Jams 11 CD, while "How Do You Sleep" was featured in the Disney live action film, G-Force.

'Departure' debuted at No. 14 on the Billboard 200 in May with sales of 30,200 copies in its first week. The album has sold 272,000 copies to date.

== Singles ==
- "Leavin'" – The song was the first single from the album and debuted at number 14 on the Billboard Hot 100 with a final rank at 10, number two on the Pop 100, and number one on the Pop 100 Airplay and the Mainstream Top 40 charts. The music video of the song was directed by Sanji. "Leavin'" also managed to reach number one on the American Top 40.
- "It's Over" – The second single was released in August. The video was released only in November. The song did not reach the success of "Leavin'", peaking at number sixty-two on the Hot 100 and number thirty-one on the Pop 100. "It's Over" managed to gain wider popularity outside the United States mostly in Asian countries like Malaysia and Singapore by peaking at number one at local radio station charts like Fly FM.
- "How Do You Sleep?" – Is the third single released from Departure. A single version, featuring rapper Ludacris, was made and sent to radio and has peaked at number twenty-six on the Hot 100 and at number seven on the Media Base's Top 40 Songs.
- "Body Language" - is the second single from Departure: Recharged. The album version is a solo version, while the single version is a duet with R&B singer T-Pain. The single peaked at 35 on the Billboard Hot 100.

== Critical reception ==
Professional ratings
Review scores
Source	Rating
AllMusic	3.5/5 stars
Common Sense Media	3/5 stars
Digital Spy	4/5 stars
Entertainment Weekly	C+
The Guardian	4/5 stars
Q	3/5 stars
USA Today	1.5/4 stars
Virgin Media	4.5/5 stars

The album received mixed reviews from music critics. Johnny Dee from Virgin Media reviewed the album saying "Without doubt the pop album of the summer." He praised McCartney's musical growth and transition stating, "McCartney has undergone an incredible re-invention from soppy tween pin-up into an R&B love stallion", comparing the new McCartney style with Justin Timberlake with the same permutation of sexual bragging and toned pop arrangements that has served him so well. He also stated about the album, "the urban slang doesn't sound very convincing but the melodies and excellent production are so sharp he gets away with it", giving it 4.5 stars out of 5.

AllMusic described the album as "a successful attempt from McCartney but still not fully complete to prove that he's no longer a kid, breaking out of his Disney Past also a departure from the stuffy adult contemporary vibe of 2006's Right Where You Want Me, which found the then-teenager acting far older than his years"; and gave it 3.5 stars out of 5. Alex Macpherson from The Guardian reviewed (Departure) as a two step process: "First, put pen to paper and come up with Bleeding Love, the monster single that launched Leona Lewis on the world. Second, reinvent yourself as an Usher-in-waiting on your third album with the help of the best post-Timbaland R&B producers (Tricky Stewart and The-Dream, the Clutch)"; and gave it four stars out of five.

Nick Levine from Digital Spy described the album as "pointing to a brighter future' for the "fresh-faced" McCartney, and gave credit to him as he stated: "McCartney's contribution shouldn't be underestimated. He's a sexier, more convincing vocalist than people would think." Also, giving credit to the production team, which includes JR Rotem, Sean Garrett and Tricky and The Dream, and as if comparing between McCartney and Justin Timberlake he stated, "JT needn't get scared yet, but he should be aware that a new pretender to his throne has arrived". Levine gave the album 4 out of 5 stars, complimenting the change in McCartney's musical style and Departure for having "plenty of winning moments".

== Promotion ==
A tour to promote the album began on August 5, 2008, and ended on August 30, 2008. Another tour to promote the album began on February 13, 2009.

McCartney was performing as the opening act for New Kids on the Block in the summer of 2009.

== Track listing ==
=== Standard edition ===
No.	Title	Writer(s)	Producer(s)	Length
1.	"Leavin'"	James Bunton; Corron Ty Cole; Terius Nash; Christopher Stewart	The-Dream; Tricky Stewart	3:38
2.	"It's Over"	Ezekiel Lewis; Balewa Muhammad; Candice Nelson; Brian Kennedy	The Clutch; Brian Kennedy	4:09
3.	"Rock You" (featuring Sean Garrett)	Garrett; Robert Gerongco; Samuel Gerongco	Garrett; Kuya	3:10
4.	"How Do You Sleep?"	Garrett; Raymond Oglesby	Garrett; Clubba Langg	3:44
5.	"Into Ya"	Garrett; Walter Scott	Garrett	3:47
6.	"Make Up"	Kwamé Holland; Theron Thomas; Timothy Thomas	Kwamé	3:54
7.	"My Baby"	Jesse McCartney; Evan Bogart; J. R. Rotem	Rotem	3:33
8.	"Told You So"	McCartney; Eric Hudson; Claude Kelly; Frankie Storm	Hudson	4:03
9.	"Relapse"	Theron Thomas; Timothy Thomas; A. Towns	Madd Scientist	3:38
10.	"Runnin'"	Kennedy; Lewis; Muhammad; Nelson; Patrick Smith	The Clutch; Kennedy	3:45
11.	"Freaky"	J. Thomas; Theron Thomas; Timothy Thomas	Madd Scientist	3:39
12.	"Not Your Enemy"	McCartney; Hudson; Kelly	Hudson	4:14
Total length:				44:59

International edition bonus track
No.	Title	Writer(s)	Producer(s)	Length
13.	"Bleeding Love"	McCartney; Ryan Tedder	The Clutch	3:51
Total length:				48:50

French edition
No.	Title	Writer(s)	Producer(s)	Length
14.	"De Toi à Moi"	McCartney; Adam Watts; Andy Dodd; Dory Lobel	Watts; Dodd	3:26
Total length:				52:16

Japanese edition
No.	Title	Writer(s)	Producer(s)	Length
13.	"Oxygen"	McCartney; Hudson; Kelly	Hudson	4:02
14.	"Bleeding Love"	McCartney; Tedder	The Clutch	3:51
15.	"Leavin'" (Bimbo Jones Radio Edit Remix)	Bunton; Cole; Nash; Stewart	The-Dream; Stewart; Bimbo Jones^{[a]}	4:09
16.	"Leavin'" (JFK Remix)	Bunton; Cole; Nash; Stewart	The-Dream; Stewart; Jesse Frederick Keeler^{[a]}	4:13
Total length:				1:01:14

Notes

- ^{^[a]} signifies additional producer(s)

=== Departure: Recharged ===
Standard Edition
No.	Title	Writer(s)	Producer(s)	Length
4.	"How Do You Sleep?" (Remix) (featuring Ludacris)	Garrett, Raymond Oglesby, Christopher Bridges	Garrett, Clubba Langg	3:28
5.	"Into Ya"	Garrett, Walter Scott	Garrett	3:47
6.	"Make Up"	Kwamé Holland, Theron Thomas, Timothy Thomas	Kwamé	3:54
7.	"My Baby"	Jesse McCartney, Evan Bogart, J. R. Rotem	J.R. Rotem	3:33
8.	"Told You So"	McCartney, Eric Hudson, Claude Kelly, Frankie Storm	Hudson	4:03
9.	"Relapse"	Theron Thomas, Timothy Thomas, A. Towns	Madd Scientist	3:38
10.	"Runnin'"	Brian Kennedy, Ezekiel Lewis, Balewa Muhammad, Candice Nelson, Patrick Smith	The Clutch, Brian Kennedy	3:45
11.	"Freaky"	J. Thomas, Theron Thomas, Timothy Thomas	Madd Scientist	3:39
12.	"Not Your Enemy"	McCartney, Hudson, Kelly	Hudson	4:14
13.	"Oxygen"	McCartney, Hudson, Kelly	Hudson	4:02
14.	"Crash & Burn"	McCartney, Kennedy, Andre Merritt	Kennedy	3:18
15.	"Body Language"	McCartney, Bunton, Cole	The Movement	3:39
16.	"In My Veins"	McCartney, Bunton, Cole	The Movement	4:16
Total length:				59:50

Bonus Track Version – Apple Music
No.	Title	Writer(s)	Producer(s)	Length
4.	"How Do You Sleep?"	Garrett, Raymond Oglesby	Garrett, Clubba Langg	3:44
13.	"Oxygen"	McCartney, Hudson, Kelly	Hudson	4:02
14.	"How Do You Sleep?" (Remix) (featuring Ludacris)	Garrett, Raymond Oglesby, Christopher Bridges	Garrett, Clubba Langg	3:28
15.	"Crash & Burn"	McCartney, Kennedy, Andre Merritt	Kennedy	3:18
16.	"Body Language"	McCartney, Bunton, Cole	The Movement	3:39
17.	"In My Veins"	McCartney, Bunton, Cole	The Movement	4:16
Total length:				01:03:42

== Charts ==
Chart performance for Departure
Chart (2008)	Peak position
Australian Albums (ARIA)	92
Canadian Albums (Nielsen SoundScan)	37
French Albums (SNEP)	174
Italian Albums (FIMI)	15
Japanese Albums (Oricon)	111
UK Albums (Official Charts)	97
US Billboard 200	14

== Release history ==
Release history for Departure
Region	Version	Date
North America	Departure	May 20, 2008
Taiwan	Departure	May 20, 2008
Hong Kong	Departure	May 20, 2008
Netherlands	Departure	May 22, 2008
Europe	Departure	May 23, 2008
Spain	Departure	May 26, 2008
Australia	Departure	May 31, 2008
Japan	Departure	May 23, 2008
Japan	Departure	June 4, 2008
United Kingdom	Departure	June 16, 2008
Brazil	Departure	June 27, 2008
Argentina	Departure	June 27, 2008
France	Departure	June 30, 2008
United States	Departure: Recharged	April 7, 2009
Taiwan	Departure: Recharged	April 30, 2009
