= Right Where You Want Me (album) =

Studio album by Jesse McCartney
- Released: September 13, 2006
- Genres: Pop rock; pop
- Length: 41:19
- Label: Hollywood
- Producers: Jon Lind; Sherry Kondor; Andy Dodd; Adam Watts; John Shanks; Kara DioGuardi; Marti Frederiksen; Emanuel Kiriakou; Dory Lobel

Jesse McCartney chronology
| Beautiful Soul (2004) | Right Where You Want Me (2006) | Departure (2008) |

Singles from Right Where You Want Me
- 1. "Right Where You Want Me" Released: August 29, 2006; 2. "Just So You Know" Released: December 7, 2006

Right Where You Want Me is the second studio album by American singer-songwriter Jesse McCartney, released in the US on September 13, 2006.

== Background ==
The first single of the same name was not as successful as his debut single "Beautiful Soul", peaking at number thirty-three on the US Billboard Hot 100. The video for his second single "Just So You Know" was shot and officially released, though the single never received a full release in the US due to lack of support from his current record label, as stated in an email from Sherry Kondor, one of Jesse's managers.

== Critical reception ==
Professional ratings
Review scores
| Source | Rating |
|---|---|
| AllMusic | 2.5/5 stars |
| PopMatters | 4/10 |
| Rolling Stone | 2/5 stars |

PopMatters editor Evan Sawde wrote that Right Where You Want Me feels manufactured and generic, comparing McCartney to "a Lunchable: pre-packaged to the point of absurdity." He argues that even though McCartney co-wrote most of the songs, the album still sounds like formulaic teen pop with "slick" production but little personality or emotion. While a few tracks are catchy Sawdey concludes the album is "tasty as a snack, but he’s got a long way to go before becoming a meal." Rolling Stone's Rob Sheffield wrote that McCartney tries to sound more serious and rock-oriented on Right Where You Want Me, but his "thin voice" struggles and doesn't convincingly fit the rock style. Sheffield doubts the attempt will succeed, suggesting McCartney lacks the vocal strength and seductive presence needed for that kind of music."

== Commercial performance ==
Right Where You Want Me debuted at number 15 on the US Billboard 200 with 53,000 copies in its first week. Following the album's moderate commercial success, McCartney went back to the studios again writing and recording for his third album.

== Track listing ==
Standard edition
| No. | Title | Writer(s) | Producer(s) | Length |
|---|---|---|---|---|
| 1. | "Right Where You Want Me" | Jesse McCartney, Andy Dodd, Dory Lobel, Adam Watts | Dodd, Watts | 3:32 |
| 2. | "Just So You Know" | McCartney, Dodd, Lobel, Watts | Dodd, Watts | 3:54 |
| 3. | "Blow Your Mind" | McCartney, Lobel, John Shanks | Shanks | 3:11 |
| 4. | "Right Back in the Water" | McCartney, Lobel | Lobel | 3:26 |
| 5. | "Anybody" | McCartney, Lobel, Kara DioGuardi, Marti Frederiksen | DioGuardi, Frederiksen | 3:21 |
| 6. | "Tell Her" | McCartney, Lobel, Franne Golde, Emanuel Kiriakou | Kiriakou | 4:00 |
| 7. | "Just Go" | McCartney, Dodd, Lobel, Watts | Dodd, Watts | 3:38 |
| 8. | "Can't Let You Go" | McCartney, Lobel, Shanks | Shanks | 2:46 |
| 9. | "We Can Go Anywhere" | McCartney, Dodd, Lobel, Watts | Dodd, Watts | 3:35 |
| 10. | "Feelin' You" | Dodd, Watts | Dodd, Watts | 3:25 |
| 11. | "Invincible" | McCartney, Lobel, DioGuardi | Lobel, DioGuardi | 3:45 |
| 12. | "Daddy's Little Girl" | McCartney, Lobel, Sherry Kondor, Drew Ramsey, Shannon Sanders | Lobel, Kondor, Sanders | 3:45 |

Walmart exclusive bonus download
| No. | Title | Writer(s) | Producer(s) | Length |
|---|---|---|---|---|
| 13. | "Gone" | McCartney, DioGuardi | DioGuardi | 3:20 |

Target exclusive bonus track
| No. | Title | Writer(s) | Producer(s) | Length |
|---|---|---|---|---|
| 13. | "Feels like Sunday" | McCartney, Lobel, DioGuardi, Frederiksen | DioGuardi, Frederiksen | 3:45 |

Italian bonus track
| No. | Title | Writer(s) | Producer(s) | Length |
|---|---|---|---|---|
| 14. | "Right Where You Want Me" (Junior Caldera Remix) | McCartney, Dodd, Lobel, Watts | Dodd, Watts | 3:13 |

Best Buy exclusive bonus track
| No. | Title | Writer(s) | Producer(s) | Length |
|---|---|---|---|---|
| 13. | "Running Away" | McCartney, Lobel, DioGuardi, Shanks | DioGuardi, Shanks | 3:35 |

Japanese bonus track
| No. | Title | Writer(s) | Producer(s) | Length |
|---|---|---|---|---|
| 14. | "Feels like Sunday" | McCartney, Lobel, DioGuardi, Frederiksen | DioGuardi, Frederiksen | 3:45 |

== Personnel ==
Musicians

- Jesse McCartney – lead vocals, background vocals (1–4, 6–12), vocal beat box (5)
- Kenny Aronoff – drums (5)
- Jeff Bova – string arrangement and programming (6)
- Paul Buckmaster – string arrangement and conductor (11)
- David J. Carpenter – bass guitar (1, 2, 4, 7, 9, 10)
- Andy Dodd – electric guitar and programming (1, 2, 4, 7, 9, 10), acoustic guitar (1, 2, 7, 9), piano (2, 4, 7, 9), keyboards and additional background vocals (1), Rhodes (10), background vocals (9)
- Marti Frederiksen – bass guitar, acoustic guitar, keyboards, drums, and percussion (5)
- Darin James – drums (12)
- Emanuel Kiriakou – piano, acoustic guitar, electric guitar, bouzouki, bass guitar, keyboards, percussion, background vocals, and drum programming (6)
- Robbie Kondor – piano (4)
- Dory Lobel – acoustic guitar (1, 2, 4, 5, 7, 12), electric guitar (1, 2, 4, 5, 7, 12), guitar (3, 8, 11)
- Suzie McNeil – background vocals (5)
- Jamie Muhoberac – keyboards (3, 8)
- Pino Palladino – bass guitar (3)
- Tim Pierce – guitars (11), additional electric guitar (1, 2, 7, 9)
- Drew Ramsey – bass guitar, electric guitar, programming, and additional background vocals (12)
- Mikal Reid – electric guitar (5)
- Jeff Rothschild – drums (3, 8)
- Shannon Sanders – electric piano, organ, synthesizer, programming, and additional background vocals (12)
- John Shanks – guitar and keyboards (3, 8), bass guitar (8), background vocals (3)
- Adam Watts – drums and programming (1, 2, 4, 7, 9, 10), acoustic guitar (9, 10), keyboards (1), electric guitar and background vocals (10)
- Greg Wells – piano, drums, and bass guitar (11)

Technical and artistic personnel

- Keith Armstrong – assistant mix engineer (1)
- David Channing – digital editing and engineer (6)
- Jason Coons – engineer (12)
- Andy Dodd – engineer (1), mixing (2, 4, 7, 9, 10)
- Andy Ellis – engineer and mixing (5)
- Juan Flores – assistant engineer (12)
- Lars Fox – Pro Tools editing (3, 8)
- Marti Frederiksen – mixing (5)
- Greg "G-Roni" Fuqua – additional engineering and Pro Tools editing (12)
- Serban Ghenea – mixing (12)
- John Hanes – additional Pro Tools engineer (12)
- Lucille Hunt – production administration (1, 2, 4, 7, 9, 10)
- Enny Joo – art direction and design
- Erik "Keller" Jahner – additional engineering and Pro Tools editing (12)
- Emanuel Kiriakou – digital editing and engineer (6)
- Sherry Kondor – executive producer
- Jon Lind – executive producer
- Chris Lord-Alge – mixing (1)
- Stephen Marcussen – mastering
- Ginger McCartney – executive producer
- James Minchin III – photography
- Brent Paschke – digital editing and engineer (6)
- Brian Paturalski – engineer (5)
- Drew Pearson – engineer (11)
- Tim Roberts – assistant Pro Tools engineer (12)
- Jeff Rothschild – engineer and mixing (3, 8)
- Dave Snow – creative director
- Jess Sutcliffe – engineer (11)
- Shari Sutcliffe – contractor and production coordinator (3, 8)
- Pat Thrall – digital editing, programming, engineer, and mixing (6)
- Adam Watts – engineer (1), mixing (2, 4, 7, 9, 10)
- Greg Wells – mixing (11)

== Charts ==
Chart performance for Right Where You Want Me
| Chart (2006) | Peak position |
|---|---|
| Australian Albums (ARIA) | 49 |
| French Albums (SNEP) | 83 |
| Italian Albums (FIMI) | 7 |
| Swiss Albums (Schweizer Hitparade) | 90 |
| Japanese Albums (Oricon) | 57 |
| Taiwanese Albums (Music of Taiwan) | 4 |
| US Billboard 200 | 15 |

== Certifications ==
| Country | Provider | Certification |
|---|---|---|
| Italy | FIMI | Gold |
| Taiwan | RIT | Gold |

== Release history ==
Right Where You Want Me release history
| Region | Date | Format(s) | Version | Label | Ref. |
|---|---|---|---|---|---|
| Japan | September 13, 2006 | CD; digital download | Standard | Hollywood | |
| Canada | September 19, 2006 | CD; digital download | Standard | Hollywood | |
| United States | September 19, 2006 | CD; digital download | Standard | Hollywood | |
| France | September 25, 2006 | CD; digital download | Standard | Hollywood | |
| Switzerland | September 25, 2006 | CD; digital download | Standard | Hollywood | |
| France | October 2, 2006 | CD; digital download | Standard | Hollywood | |
| Italy | October 2, 2006 | CD; digital download | Standard | Hollywood | |
| Australia | October 24, 2006 | CD; digital download | Standard | Hollywood | |
| Brazil | October 24, 2006 | CD; digital download | Standard | Hollywood | |
| Hong Kong | October 24, 2006 | CD; digital download | Standard | Hollywood | |
| Taiwan | October 24, 2006 | CD; digital download | Standard | Hollywood | |
| Italy | June 25, 2007 | CD; digital download | Italian Version | Hollywood | |
