= Jesse McCartney =

American actor and singer (born 1987)

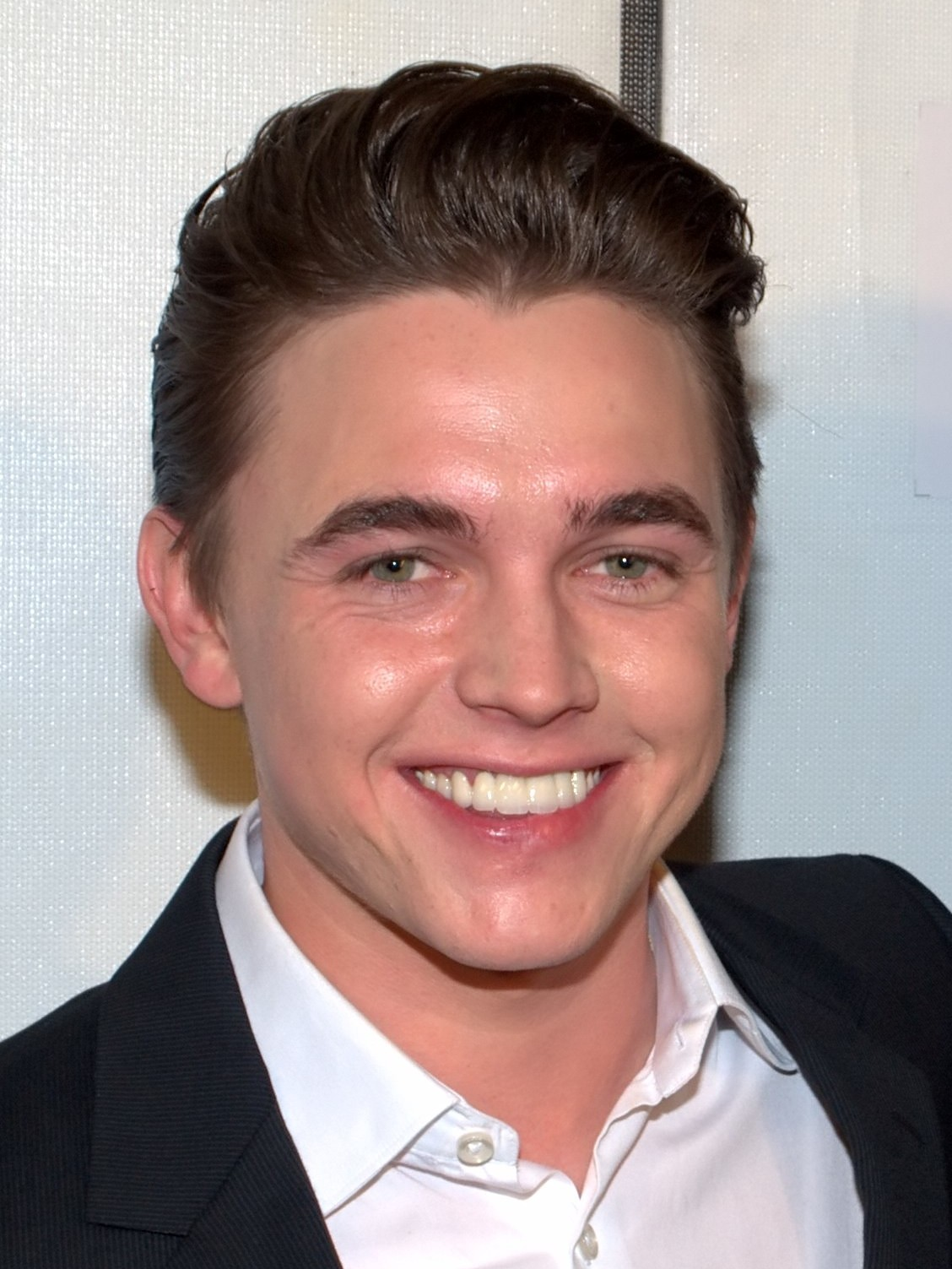
- McCartney at the 2010 Tribeca Film Festival
- Born: April 9, 1987 (age 39); Ardsley, New York, U.S.
- Occupations: Actor; singer; songwriter
- Years active: 1998–present
- Spouse: Katie Peterson (m. 2021)
- Children: 1
- Musical career
- Genres: Pop; pop rock; R&B
- Instruments: Vocals; piano
- Labels: Hollywood; Eight0Eight; Blue Suit; The Orchard; AWAL
- Formerly of: Dream Street
- Website: www.jessemccartney.com

Jesse McCartney (born April 9, 1987) is an American actor, singer, and songwriter. He achieved fame in the late 1990s on the daytime drama All My Children as JR Chandler. He later joined the boy band Dream Street, and eventually branched out into a solo musical career. Additionally, McCartney has appeared on shows such as Law & Order: SVU, Summerland, and Greek. McCartney has voiced characters such as Theodore in the live-action Alvin and the Chipmunks film series, JoJo McDodd in Horton Hears a Who!, Terence in the Tinker Bell series, Dick Grayson in Young Justice, and Roxas and Ventus in the Kingdom Hearts video game series.

McCartney's solo music career began in 2004 with his debut album Beautiful Soul. "Leavin'", a single from his third album Departure, reached the top 10 on the Billboard Hot 100 and is his best-selling song. His most recent album, New Stage, was released in 2021. McCartney is also known for co-writing "Bleeding Love", which became a worldwide hit for Leona Lewis in 2007.

== Early life ==
McCartney was born on April 9, 1987 in Ardsley, Westchester, New York, the son of Virginia "Ginger" (née Sarber) and Scott McCartney. He has a younger sister named Lea (b. 1991) and a younger brother named Timothy (b. 1996). He began performing in local community musicals at the age of seven, when he debuted his role in Oliver!, before joining the national tour of The King and I at age ten as Louis, along with Phil of the Future star Ricky Ullman. In 1998, he sang with the group Sugar Beats and can be heard on their 1998, 1999, and 2000 CD releases.

== Music career ==
=== 1999–2002: Dream Street ===
In 1999, McCartney joined the American pop boy band Dream Street, and was a member until 2002. He described the experience as a good "stepping stone" for his solo career. The group earned a gold record with their debut CD. At fifteen, he began work on a solo career with a local band, featuring musicians Dillon Kondor (guitar), Peter Chema (bass), Katie Spencer (keyboards), Alex Russeku (drums), Karina LaGravinese (background vocals), Sharisse Francisco (background vocals), and under the management of Ginger McCartney and Sherry Goffin Kondor, who co-produced his first album Beautiful Soul.

McCartney released his first solo EP in July 2003. The album featured three songs: "Beautiful Soul", "Don't You", "Why Don't You Kiss Her". In 2004, he performed a duet with Anne Hathaway, "Don't Go Breaking My Heart", which is featured on the Ella Enchanted soundtrack.

=== 2004–2006: Beautiful Soul and Right Where You Want Me ===
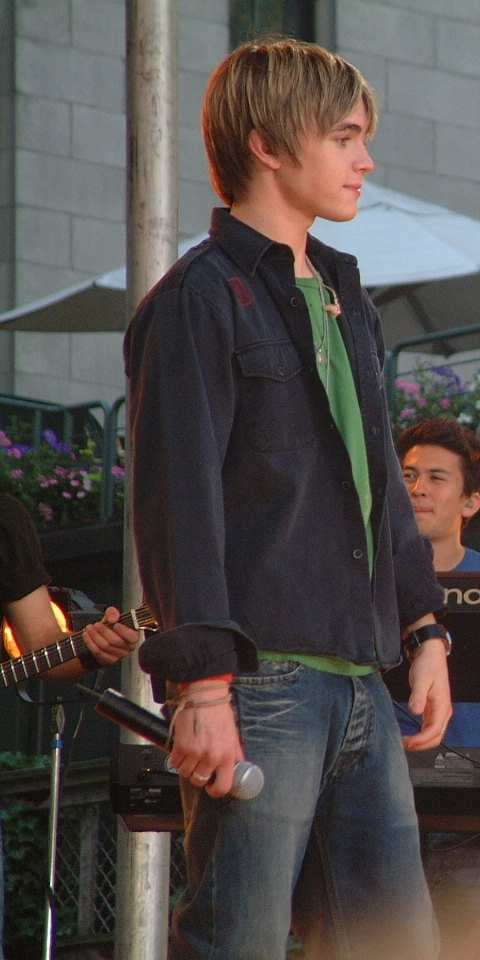
McCartney at a Bryant Park performance, June 23, 2005

McCartney's debut solo album, Beautiful Soul, which was two years in the making, was released on September 28, 2004 in the United States and over a year later in Europe. He categorized it as a "pop record" with twists of urban. The album featured four songs that he co-wrote. Beautiful Soul reached number 15 on the Billboard 200. The album has been certified platinum by the Recording Industry Association of America, denoting over one million units of shipment to US retailers; it is his highest-certified album as of early 2009. By mid-2006, the album sold more than 1.5 million copies. The album's lead single of the same name reached number 16 on the Billboard Hot 100. McCartney was one of the artists to win multiple awards at the 2005 Teen Choice Awards, including Choice Crossover Artist, Choice Male Artist and Choice Breakout, Male. The following year, he won Favorite Male Singer at the Nickelodeon Kids' Choice Awards.

His first headlining tour, also named Beautiful Soul, began on May 2, 2005, at the Crest Theatre in Sacramento, California. The United States portion of the tour spanned 56 stops, ending on September 10, 2005, at the Madera District County Fair in Madera, California. In the fall of 2005, McCartney toured Australia, and opened for the Backstreet Boys in Europe in the summer of 2005. His July 9 performance at California's Great America in Santa Clara, California, was recorded, released as Live: The Beautiful Soul Tour in November 2005.

After the filming of Keith wrapped, McCartney began working on his second album, Right Where You Want Me, co-writing all but one of the songs featured in it. Right Where You Want Me is more mature than his debut, reflecting his musical and personal growth since he recorded his debut album at age 15. Released by Hollywood Records on September 19, 2006, the album reached number 14 on the Billboard 200.

=== 2007–2009: Songwriting and Departure ===
In the fall of 2007, McCartney co-wrote the hit song "Bleeding Love" with Ryan Tedder of OneRepublic, produced by McCartney and Tedder for McCartney's third album, but gave it away to British singer Leona Lewis for her debut album Spirit. The song was nominated for Record of the Year at the 2009 Grammy Awards. McCartney recorded his own version, which was released on some editions of his Departure album.

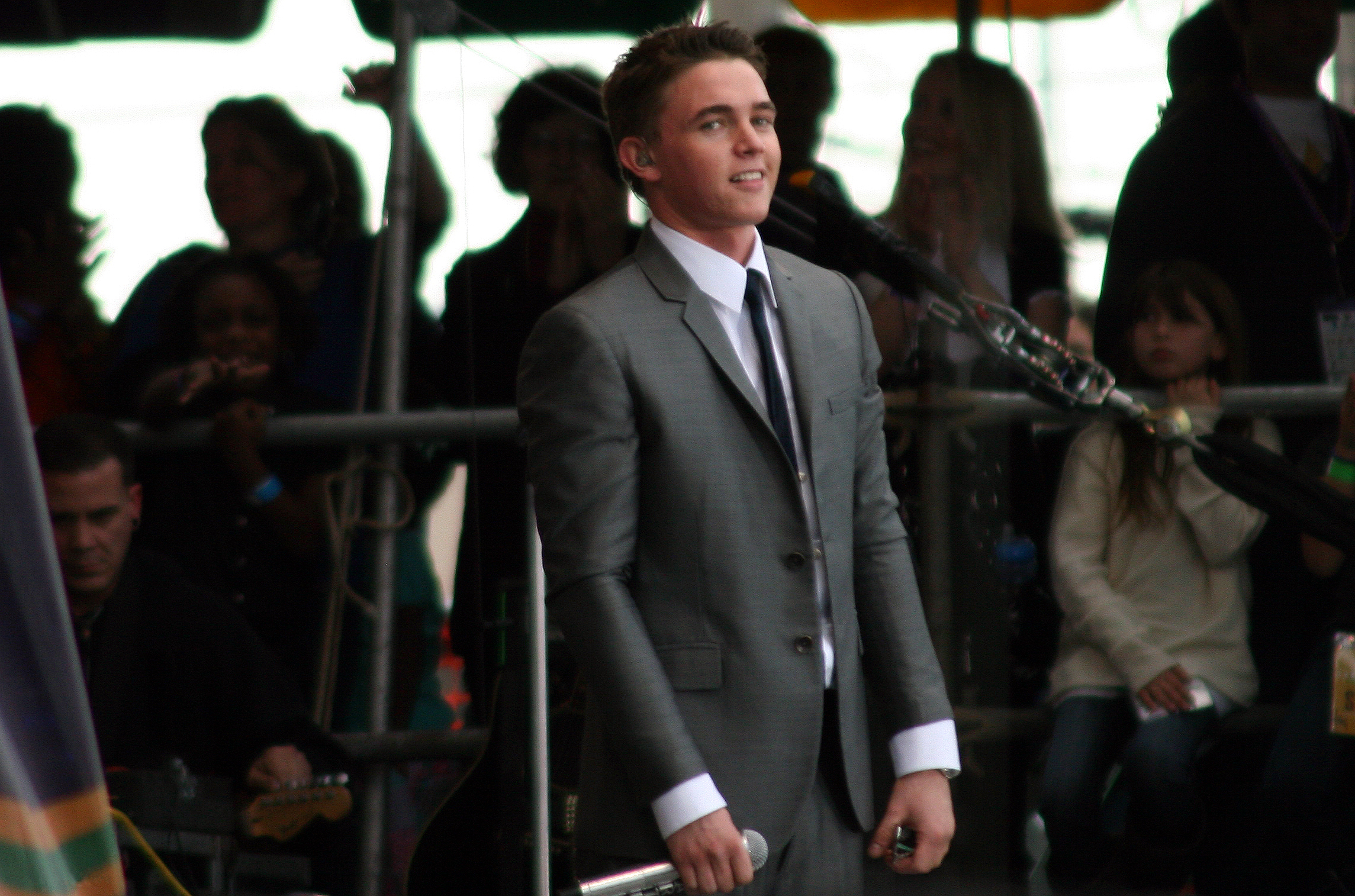
McCartney performing in Metairie, Louisiana, on February 15, 2009

McCartney released his third album, Departure, on May 20, 2008 in the United States and Canada. Musically, it is a departure from his early works, showcasing more mature themes. The album has reached number 14 on the Billboard 200.

The album's lead single, "Leavin'", was released in March 2008, and reached number 10 on the Billboard Hot 100, giving McCartney his highest-charting single to date. The single was certified platinum by the RIAA, selling over two million downloads on iTunes, becoming McCartney's highest-certified single as of early 2009. The second single, "It's Over", was released on August 26, 2008, and reached #62 on the Hot 100. McCartney promoted Departure on a co-headlining tour with Jordin Sparks, which began in August 2008 and ended in September. He also did solo shows at theaters and small venues to support the album while on tour with Sparks. Sparks also approached him to write some material for her.

McCartney re-released Departure on April 7, 2009. The re-release, Departure: Recharged, featured four new songs: "Body Language", "Oxygen", "Crash & Burn", and "In My Veins". The re-release also features a remix of "How Do You Sleep?" with rapper-actor Ludacris. The third single from the album was released from the re-release and was the remix of "How Do You Sleep?". It was much more successful than the second single, reaching #26 on the Hot 100. The fourth and final single from the album was also released from the re-release and was a new version of "Body Language" featuring T-Pain. The single reached #35 on the Hot 100.

=== 2010–2014: Have It All and In Technicolor ===
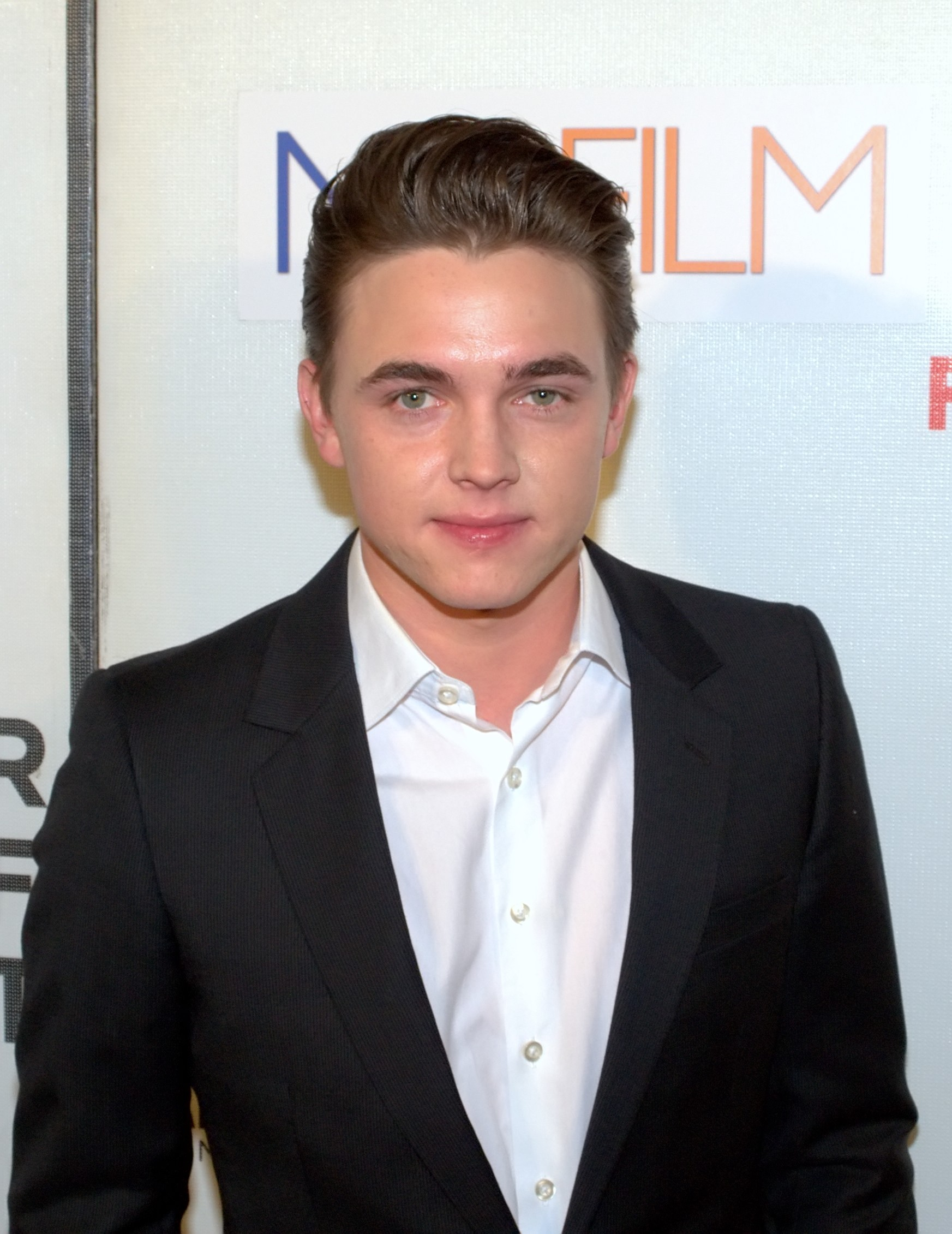
McCartney at the 2010 Tribeca Film Festival

The lead single from his fourth studio album Have It All, "Shake", was sent to radio on September 8, 2010 and was released digitally on September 21, 2010. The song peaked at #54 on the Hot 100. On October 18, 2010, it was announced that Have It All would be released in January 2011. On November 30, it was announced that the album release would be pushed up to December 28, 2010, the Tuesday following Christmas. On December 3, 2010, McCartney announced through his Facebook page that he pushed the release date for the album back to early 2011. On April 7, 2011, McCartney responded to a question on his Twitter page about the delay, saying it hinged on pickup of Locke & Key. On November 3, McCartney said via his WhoSay page "2012 is still the magic year for the record to finally come out." On May 6, 2012, McCartney's mother said on Twitter that the replacement of the President of his label, Hollywood Records, in January 2012 was delaying the release of his album. In the March 2013 issue of Glamouholic magazine that he has covered, an exclusive interview was conducted and he confirmed the release of his anticipated fourth studio album, after all the disbandments of his record label, within this year. Have It All, however, would go on to never be officially released.

On May 13, it was confirmed on On Air with Ryan Seacrest that McCartney would be joining the Backstreet Boys and DJ Pauly D on their In a World Like This Tour, which kicked off on August 2, 2013. On August 13, the singer released "Back Together", the lead single from his fifth studio album, published by the independent label Eight0Eight Records. He performed it live on the Today show on August 15, 2013. On December 10, 2013, McCartney released a four-song EP titled In Technicolor, Part 1, followed by the single "Superbad", released on May 6, 2014. McCartney's fifth studio album, In Technicolor, was released on July 22, 2014. The third single off the album, "Punch Drunk Recreation", was released on November 19, 2014.

=== 2018–2021: The Resolution Tour Live, Dream Street Reunion, and New Stage ===
On March 23, 2018, McCartney announced the release of his new single "Better With You" with the music video featuring actress Danielle Campbell. He later released a second single titled "Wasted" with a music video directed by Jason Lester, followed by the live album The Resolution Tour Live.

In 2020, McCartney competed on the third season of The Masked Singer as "Turtle". He finished as the runner-up. On April 10, 2020, he released the music video for the single "Yours". The single "Friends" was released on May 19, 2020. The official music video featured former Greek castmates Scott Michael Foster, Jacob Zachar, and Paul James.

On June 2, 2020, McCartney's former Dream Street bandmate Chris Trousdale died at a hospital in Burbank, California, at the age of 34 due to complications from an unknown illness during the COVID-19 pandemic in California. It was later revealed that COVID-19 was the main complication of Trousdale's death. On June 11, 2020, on what would be Trousdale's 35th birthday, McCartney and his former Dream Street bandmates Greg Raposo, Frankie Galasso, and Matt Ballinger reunited for a virtual performance of "It Happens Every Time" to pay tribute to him.

McCartney's fifth studio album, New Stage was released on October 8, 2021. The record was preceded by two singles: "Kiss The World Goodbye" and "Party for Two". To promote the album, McCartney embarked on his North American tour, to run from November 4 to December 8, 2021.

=== 2024: All's Well ===
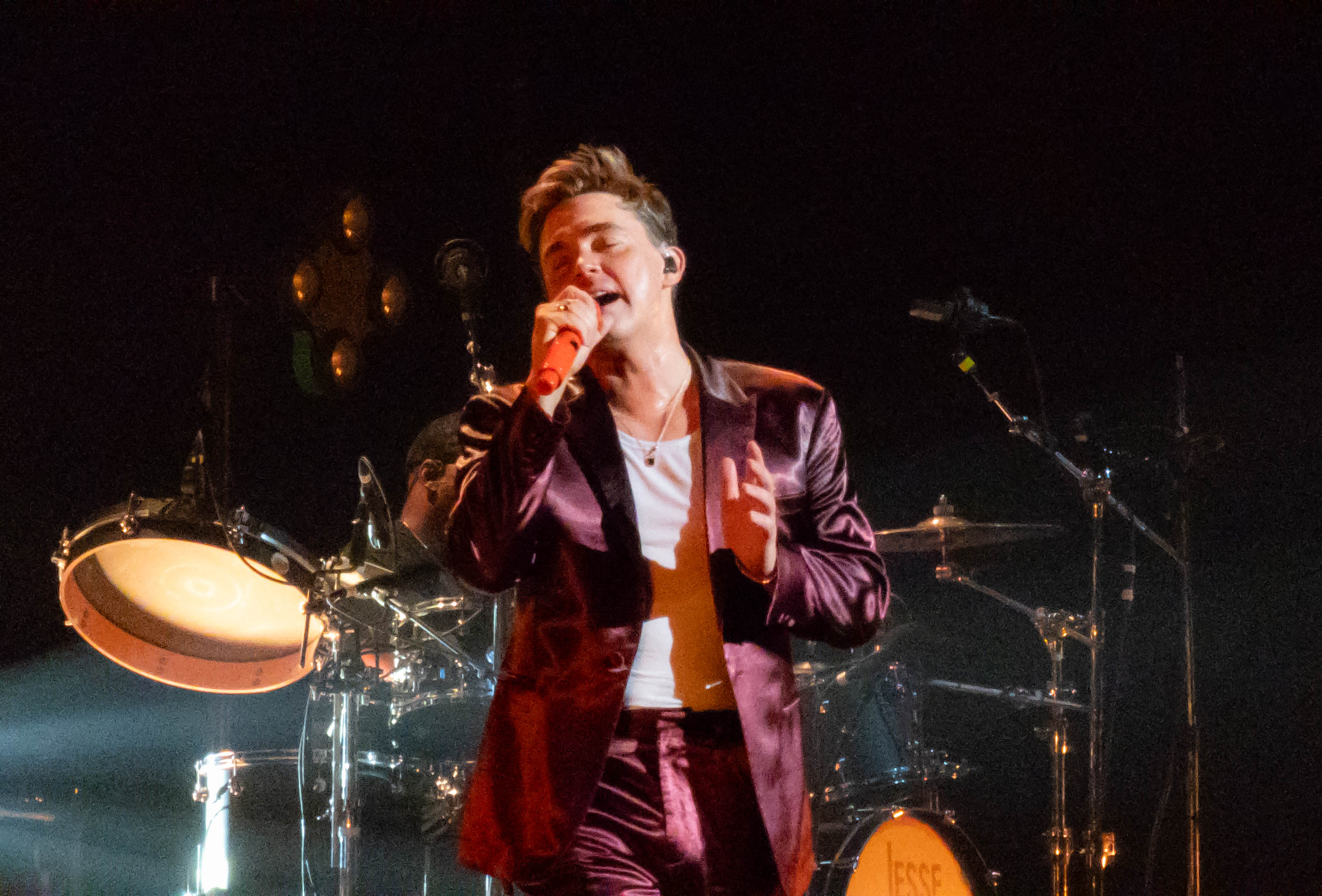
McCartney performing during the All's Well Tour, 2024

Three years after the release of his album New Stage (2021), McCartney released his fourth EP, All's Well, on April 5, 2024. With "racy lyrics and familiar early '00s pop sounds", the record was preceded by two singles: "Faux Fur" and "Make a Baby" featuring Yung Gravy. McCartney went on tour to promote the album, from April 12 (in Austin, Texas) to May 16 (in Los Angeles). McCartney briefly reunited with his former Dream Street bandmates after one of his performances on April 27, at the Empire Live in New York City, where they performed a rendition of their cover of "Sugar Rush" originally performed by A-Teens.

=== 2025–present: Weightless ===
On July 18th, 2025 McCartney came on as a special guest on Matt Rife's Stay Golden Tour at Madison Square Garden. On September 19th, 2025 McCartney released his fifth EP Weightless. The Weightless Tour kicked off in Washington DC on September 30, 2025. Starting November 17th, 2025 he opened for the Jonas Brothers on their Jonas20: Greetings from Your Hometown Tour until December 22nd, 2025.

== Other ventures ==
=== Acting career ===
McCartney appeared with The Who's Roger Daltrey in A Christmas Carol at Madison Square Garden. From 1998–2001, McCartney played Adam Chandler Jr. in the ABC soap opera All My Children, a role for which he earned two Young Artist Awards and two Daytime Emmy Award nominations. He also later starred in the short-lived series Summerland (2004–05), which aired on The WB for two seasons, playing orphaned teenager Bradin Westerly.

In 2005, McCartney appeared as himself on the Disney Channel show The Suite Life of Zack & Cody. In 2007, he starred as himself on the Disney Channel show Hannah Montana. In 2008, McCartney was also featured as the voice of JoJo McDodd in Horton Hears a Who! (2008). McCartney also voiced Theodore in the live-action Alvin and the Chipmunks franchise (2007–2015), in addition to voicing Terence in the Tinker Bell film series. He also voices Robin/Nightwing in the Young Justice series.

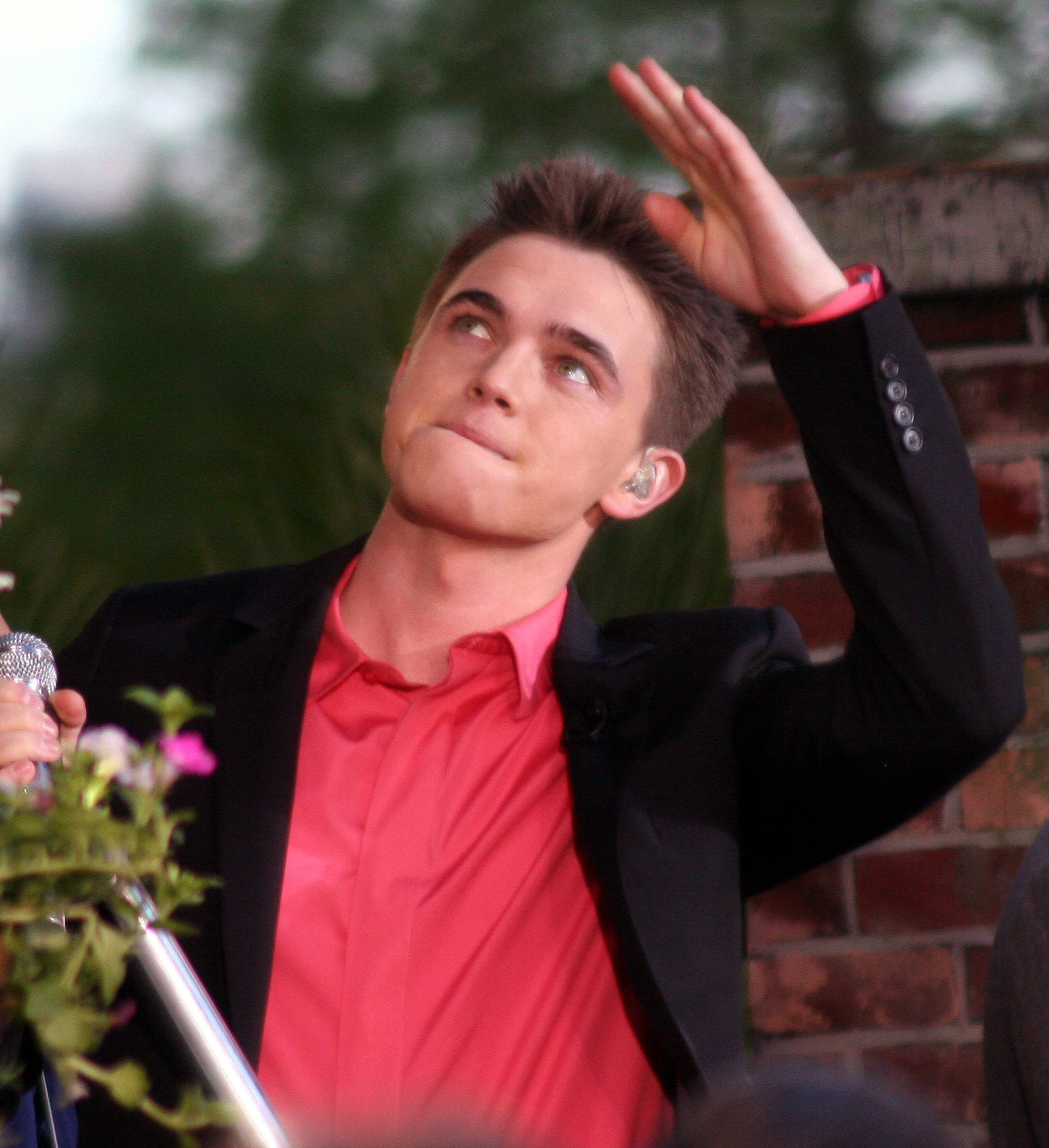
McCartney on the Live! With Regis and Kelly TV show, April 2009

In 2008, McCartney co-starred along with Elisabeth Harnois in an independent teenage drama feature film, Keith, directed by Todd Kessler. It was his film debut, and features McCartney in the title role. Keith was released on September 19, 2008.

According to Entertainment Weekly, in December 2008, McCartney was negotiating to play against type in the role of the Fire Nation's Prince Zuko in M. Night Shyamalan's feature film adaptation of Avatar: The Last Airbender. In February 2009, British actor Dev Patel replaced McCartney, whose tour dates conflicted with a boot camp scheduled for the cast to train in martial arts. McCartney has expressed an interest in directing and producing films and even considered enrolling in a film school.

McCartney appeared as a recurring character in the ABC Family series Greek for several episodes playing a star football talent who joins Kappa Tau. His character eventually decides to depledge the fraternity after citing pressures between football and Greek life combined with Rusty stealing his girlfriend Jordan.

McCartney also worked in several installments of the Square Enix video game series Kingdom Hearts. He was featured as Roxas in Kingdom Hearts II in 2006, and reprised the role in 2009 in Kingdom Hearts 358/2 Days. He also provided the voice work for Ventus, a character in the video game of the same series Kingdom Hearts Birth by Sleep in 2010. He reprised both roles in Kingdom Hearts 3D: Dream Drop Distance, released in 2012, as well as in Kingdom Hearts III, released in 2019.

McCartney also starred in the horror film Chernobyl Diaries, released on May 25, 2012. He appeared in the seventh season of the Lifetime Network series Army Wives in 2013, portraying a young soldier deployed to Afghanistan with an 18-year-old wife at home.

In the summer of 2014, McCartney had a guest-starring role in the ABC Family series Young & Hungry. McCartney played "Cooper", a computer hacker with a romantic interest in the show's lead, played by Emily Osment.

In 2016, McCartney appeared on Fear the Walking Dead as Reed, an aggressive member of a group of pirates.

Jesse McCartney's acting career also includes voice over work (or voice acting) with Breathe Bible.

On April 16, 2026, McCartney appeared as himself on the fifth season of Hacks. A longtime fan of the show, McCartney got in touch with series star Hannah Einbinder due to a poster of him appearing in her character Ava's childhood bedroom during Season 1. She admitted that she had grown up listening to his music, and told the show's producers that Ava would also have McCartney's poster on her bedroom wall. In turn, McCartney told Einbinder to let him know if they wanted him to appear on the show.

=== Philanthropy ===
In 2005, McCartney participated in "Come Together Now", a charity single to benefit the victims of the 2004 Asian tsunami and the 2005 Hurricane Katrina.

Later in 2005, McCartney signed on as an official supporter of Little Kids Rock, a nonprofit organization that provides free musical instruments and instruction to children in underserved public schools throughout the U.S.A. He sits on LKR's Honorary Board of Directors.

He has donated proceeds of his 2005 tour for disaster relief, recorded radio spots promoting the "Kids For A Drug-Free America" campaign, is a spokesperson for the St. Jude Children's Research Hospital, and is involved in the charity SPACE, which was co-founded by a childhood friend of his mother's. McCartney performed at the Hope Rocks concert in 2005 to benefit the City of Hope Cancer Center. He appeared in the Concert for Hope on October 25, 2009, with Miley Cyrus and Demi Lovato.

== Personal life ==
In September 2019, McCartney got engaged to Katie Peterson, his girlfriend of seven years. They married on October 23, 2021. On February 14, 2025, it was revealed that McCartney and his wife were expecting their first child. The couple's son was born prematurely in May 2025. In October 2026, they announced they were expecting their second child due March 2027.

== Awards and nominations ==
=== Behind the Voice Actors Awards ===
Year	Nominee / work	Award	Result
2012	Young Justice	Best Vocal Ensemble in a Television Series	Nominated
2013	Young Justice	Best Vocal Ensemble in a Television Series	Won
2013	Kingdom Hearts 3D: Dream Drop Distance	Best Vocal Ensemble in a Video Game	Won
2014	Young Justice	Best Vocal Ensemble in a Television Series	Won

=== Groovevolt Music and Fashion Awards ===
Year	Nominee / work	Award	Result
2006	"Beautiful Soul"	Best Pop Song Performance - Male	Won
2006	Beautiful Soul	Best Pop Album - Male	Nominated
2006	"Stupid Things"	Best Pop Deep Cut	Nominated
2007	"Invincible"	Best Pop Deep Cut	Nominated

=== Radio Disney Music Awards ===
Year	Nominee / work	Award	Result
2005	Himself	Best Male Artist	Won
2005	"Beautiful Soul"	Song of the Year	Nominated
2005	"Beautiful Soul"	Best Song You Can't Believe Your Parents Know the Words To	Nominated
2005	"Good Life"	Best TV Movie Song	Nominated
2006	Himself	Best Male Artist	Won
2007	Himself	Best Male Artist	Won

=== Teen Choice Awards ===
Year	Nominee / work	Award	Result
2005	Himself	Choice Music: Male Artist	Won
2005	Himself	Choice Music: Breakout Artist - Male	Won
2005	Himself	Choice Crossover Artist	Won
2005	Himself	Choice Hottie: Male	Nominated
2005	Summerland	Choice TV Actor: Drama	Nominated
2005	"Beautiful Soul"	Choice Music: Single	Nominated
2005	"Beautiful Soul"	Choice Music: Love Song	Nominated
2006	Himself	Choice Music: V-Cast Artist	Nominated
2008	Himself	Choice Music: Male Artist	Nominated
2008	Himself	Choice Fanatic Fans	Nominated
2008	"Leavin'"	Choice Summer Song	Nominated
2009	"How Do You Sleep?"	Choice Music: Love Song	Nominated
2012	Alvin and the Chipmunks: Chipwrecked	Choice Movie Voice	Nominated

=== Young Artist Awards ===
Year	Nominee / work	Award	Result
2000	All My Children	Best Performance in a Soap Opera - Young Actor	Nominated
2001	All My Children	Best Performance in a Daytime TV Series: Young Actor	Won
2002	All My Children	Best Performance in a TV Drama Series: Supporting Young Actor	Won
2005	Summerland	Best Performance in a TV Series (Comedy or Drama) - Leading Young Actor	Nominated

=== Other awards ===
Year	Awards	Work	Category	Result
2001	Soap Opera Digest Awards	All My Children	Outstanding Child Actor	Nominated
2001	Daytime Emmy Awards	All My Children	Outstanding Younger Actor in a Drama Series	Nominated
2002	Daytime Emmy Awards	All My Children	Outstanding Younger Actor in a Drama Series	Nominated
2005	Nickelodeon Australian Kids' Choice Awards	Himself	Fave Music Artist	Nominated
2005	Nickelodeon Australian Kids' Choice Awards	Himself	Fave TV Star	Nominated
2005	Nickelodeon Australian Kids' Choice Awards	Himself	Fave Hottie	Won
2005	American Music Awards	Himself	Favorite Breakthrough Artist	Nominated
2005	MTV Video Music Awards	"Beautiful Soul"	Best Pop Video	Nominated
2005	ASCAP Pop Music Awards	"Beautiful Soul"	Most Performed Song	Won
2005	Billboard Music Awards	"Beautiful Soul"	Top Soundtrack Single	Nominated
2006	APRA Music Awards	"Beautiful Soul"	Most Performed Foreign Work	Nominated
2010	ASCAP Pop Music Awards	"Bleeding Love"	Most Performed Song	Won
2012	Online Film & Television Association	Young Justice	Best Voice-Over Performance	Nominated

== Discography ==
- Beautiful Soul (2004)
- Right Where You Want Me (2006)
- Departure (2008)
- In Technicolor (2014)
- New Stage (2021)

== Tours ==
Headlining

- Beautiful Soul Tour (2004–05)
- Right Where You Want Me Tour (2006–07)
- Departure Mini-Tour (2008)
- Headlining Tour (2009)
- Jesse McCartney: In Technicolor Tour (2014)
- Better with You U.S. Tour (2018)
- The Resolution Tour (2019)
- The New Stage Tour (2022)
- All's Well Tour (2024)
- The Weightless Tour (2025)

Co-headlining

- Jesse & Jordin LIVE Tour (2008)

Opening act

- Backstreet Boys: Never Gone Tour (2005)
- New Kids on the Block: Full Service Summer Tour (2009)
- Backstreet Boys: In a World Like This Tour (2013)
- Matt Rife Stay Golden Tour (2025)
- Jonas20: Greetings from Your Hometown Tour (2025)

== Filmography ==
=== Film ===
Year	Title	Role	Notes
2001	The Pirates of Central Park	Simon Baskin	
2001	Dream Street Live	Himself	Concert film
2005	Pizza	Justin Bridges	
2005	The Biggest Fan (Note: Completed in 2002 and released in 2005)	Himself	Cameo
2005	Jesse McCartney Up Close	Himself	Documentary film
2005	Jesse McCartney Live: The Beautiful Soul Tour	Himself	Concert film
2007	Alvin and the Chipmunks	Theodore Seville	Voice role
2008	Horton Hears a Who!	JoJo McDodd	Voice role; cameo
2008	Unstable Fables: 3 Pigs and a Baby	Lucky	Voice role
2008	Keith	Keith Zetterstrom	
2008	Tinker Bell	Terence	Voice role
2009	Jesse McCartney: Live at the House Blues Sunset Strip	Himself	Concert film
2009	Tinker Bell and the Lost Treasure	Terence	Voice role
2009	Alvin and the Chipmunks: The Squeakquel	Theodore Seville	Voice role
2010	Beware the Gonzo	Gavin Reilly	
2010	Tinker Bell and the Great Fairy Rescue	Terence	Voice role
2011	Pixie Hollow Games	Terence	Voice role
2011	Alvin and the Chipmunks: Chipwrecked	Theodore Seville	Voice role
2012	Chernobyl Diaries	Chris	
2012	Wings	Cyclone	Voice role
2012	Secret of the Wings	Terence	Voice role
2014	The Clockwork Girl	Huxley	Voice role
2014	The Pirate Fairy	Terence	Voice role
2014	Wings: Sky Force Heroes	T-Bone	Voice role
2015	88	Winks	
2015	Campus Code	Ari	
2015	Alvin and the Chipmunks: The Road Chip	Theodore Seville	Voice role
2020	Love, Weddings & Other Disasters	Lenny	
2022	The Big Trip 2: Special Delivery	Oscar	Voice role; replacing Drake Bell

=== Television ===
Year	Title	Role	Notes
1998–2001	All My Children	JR Chandler	Recurring role
2000	Law & Order	Danny Driscoll	Episode: "Thin Ice"
2002	The Strange Legacy of Cameron Cruz	Cameron Cruz	Unsold TV pilot
2004	What I Like About You	Himself	Episode: "The Not-So Simple Life"
2004–2005	Summerland	Bradin Westerly	Main role
2005	All That	Himself	Season 10, Episode 3
2005	The Suite Life of Zack & Cody	Himself	Episode: "Rock Star in the House"
2005	Punk'd	Himself	2 episodes
2006	Schooled	Himself	Musical performer
2006	Celebrity Duets	Himself	Musical performer
2006	All My Children	Himself	Musical performer
2007	Hannah Montana	Himself	Episode: "When You Wish You Were the Star"
2008	Extreme Makeover: Home Edition	Himself	Episode: "The Gilyeat Family"
2008	Dance on Sunset	Himself	Episode: "Prom"
2008	Dancing with the Stars	Himself	Musical Performer
2008	Law & Order: Special Victims Unit	Max Matarazzo	Episode: "Babes"
2009	Greek	Andy	Recurring role (season 2), 6 episodes
2010–2013, 2019–2022	Young Justice	Dick Grayson / Robin / Nightwing	Voice role; main cast
2011	Locke & Key	Tyler Locke	Unsold TV pilot
2012	CSI: Crime Scene Investigation	Wes Clyborn	Episode: "Seeing Red"
2013	Ben and Kate	College Guy	Cameo; episode: "Ethics 101"
2013	Army Wives	Tim Truman	Main role (season 7)
2013	Fly or Die	Himself	Cameo
2014	Expecting Amish	Josh	Television film (Lifetime)
2014–2015	Young & Hungry	Cooper Finley	Recurring role (seasons 1–2), 7 episodes
2015	The F Word	Himself	Episodes: "Jesse Mccartney"
2016	Fear the Walking Dead	Reed	2 episodes
2016	Talking Dead	Himself	Guest
2016	Major Crimes	Tucker	Episode: "Present Tense"
2020	Celebrity Watch Party	Himself	Episode: "The Deadliest Couch"
2020	I Can See Your Voice	Himself (guest judge)	Season 1, Episode 6
2020–2021	The Masked Singer	Turtle, 2020; Himself, 2021	Runner-up in 2020, as a guest singer in 2021
2024	Name That Tune	Himself	Episode: "TV Stars and Chart Toppers"
2025	Chibiverse	Dreambot	Voice role; Episode: "Mabel's Dream Date"
2026	Hacks	Himself	Episode: "Number One Fan"

=== Video games ===
Year	Title	Role
2006	Kingdom Hearts II	Roxas
2007	Kingdom Hearts II Final Mix	Roxas
2008	The Hardy Boys: The Hidden Theft	Frank Hardy
2009	Kingdom Hearts 358/2 Days	Roxas
2010	Kingdom Hearts Birth by Sleep	Ventus, Roxas
2011	Kingdom Hearts Re:coded	Roxas
2012	Kingdom Hearts 3D: Dream Drop Distance	Roxas, Ventus
2013	Young Justice: Legacy	Nightwing
2013	Kingdom Hearts HD 1.5 Remix	Roxas (archival and new footage)
2014	Kingdom Hearts HD 2.5 Remix	Roxas, Ventus (archival and new footage)
2017	Kingdom Hearts HD 2.8 Final Chapter Prologue	Roxas, Ventus
2019	Kingdom Hearts III	Roxas, Ventus
2020	Kingdom Hearts: Melody of Memory	Roxas
