= Natalie Gauci =

Australian musician and singer-songwriter (born 1981)

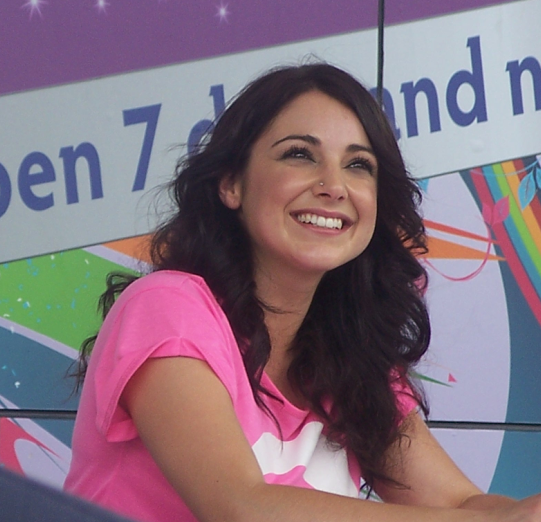
- Gauci at Westpoint Shopping Centre, Blacktown on 29 January 2008

Background information
- Born: Natalie Rose Gauci; 26 November 1981 (age 44); Melbourne, Victoria, Australia
- Genres: Jazz, pop, soul, dance, house, electronic
- Occupations: Musician, teacher, producer
- Instruments: Piano, vocals, keyboard
- Years active: 1995–present
- Labels: Sony, Adaptor, Sorry Shoes, OneLove, The Gauch
- Website: natalierosegauci.com

Natalie Rose Gauci (born 26 November 1981) is an Australian musician, producer and teacher. Gauci undertook music tuition at the Victorian College of the Arts, formed her own band that played gigs in Melbourne, while also working as a music teacher. After an appearance on national radio station Triple J's talent contest, Unearthed, she successfully auditioned for the fifth series of Australian Idol in 2007 and went on to win the series.

Gauci subsequently signed a record deal with Sony BMG Australia and in November that year released her debut single, "Here I Am", which reached number two on the ARIA Singles Chart and gained a gold accreditation. The next month her debut album, The Winner's Journey, followed. It peaked at number eleven on the ARIA Albums Chart and was certified platinum. In 2010 she formed Tune in Tokyo, an electro-pop band, with producer Paul Brandoli, they released two singles, "Dreamer" (November 2010) and "Ray of Love" (April 2012). On 1 July 2012 Gauci released her second studio album, jazz-oriented Ha Ha Ha, on The Gauch Records and followed on 3 September with an alternative-electronic EP, Elektrik Field. By August that year Gauci was living and working in London both as a recording artist and music teacher.

== Early life ==
Natalie Gauci was born on 26 November 1981 and grew up in Melbourne. Her father is Maltese and was born in Marsa, Malta and her mother is Italian. Gauci is the eldest child with two siblings. Gauci started secondary school at Emmaus College, Vermont South and completed her final two years at Box Hill Institute of TAFE, before studying music at the Victorian College of the Arts. In August 1996 Gauci acted as 'ORCA Girl' on Australian science fiction TV series, Ocean Girl, Season 3, Episode 3, "Draining the Spaceship". From the age of 17, she began writing songs.

Gauci performed as a session musician, and in 2002, she began writing her debut three-track extended play, Take It or Leave It, which was released in 2006. As well as lead vocals Gauci also provided piano; on the EP she was backed by Simon Burke on Hammond organ and Rhodes keyboard, John Castle on bass guitar and producer, Michael Carmona on percussion, Cory Jach on lead guitar, Barney Loveland on bass guitar and Haydn Meggitt on drums. It had been recorded at Castle's home studio, The Shed, in Camberwell.

In 2006 she formed the Natalie Gauci Band with herself on lead vocals and keyboards, Jules Pascoe on electric and double bass, Conrad Tracey on drums and percussion, and Kumar Shome on electric and acoustic guitar. They played soul, pop, and jazz at local pubs, clubs, weddings, and corporate functions. Gauci uploaded work from Take It or Leave It to the national radio station, Triple J's website, and was subsequently chosen for the Unearthed talent competition and gained radio airplay and coverage. To help fund her work, Gauci worked as a vocals teacher at the Academy of Mary Immaculate, Fitzroy; and Assumption College, Kilmore.

== Australian Idol ==
In 2007 Natalie Gauci auditioned in Melbourne for the fifth series of TV talent competition, Australian Idol. She performed an original song, "Free Falling", co-written by Gauci with James Kempster; and a rendition of Gloria Gaynor's "I Will Survive". Judges, Ian Dickson and Mark Holden, were impressed by Gauci's latter performance, with Dickson commenting "I think you can win this competition". Fellow judge, Marcia Hines, warned that such a comment had been "the kiss of death" for contestants in the past. Gauci advanced to the next round, and continued to impress the judges, resulting in her selection in the top 24. Her performance of "Hurt" by Christina Aguilera did not gain enough public votes to proceed to the top 12. However, she was selected by the judges to perform in the wildcard, an episode from which four contestants would be chosen to complete the top 12. Gauci performed "Feeling Good" by Nina Simone. She did not gain enough votes, but was selected by the judges to be the final top 12 member.

Gauci progressed through the top 12 knockout phase; it was not until the eighth week, with five contestants remaining, that she appeared in the bottom three—those with the three lowest number of votes for that week. Her performances have earned acclaim; The Courier-Mail noted her renditions of Rihanna's "Umbrella", Kate Bush's "Running Up that Hill", and Gnarls Barkley's "Crazy" as highlights. Her performances of "Umbrella", Divinyls' "Boys in Town", and Morgan Lewis's "How High the Moon" earned "touchdowns" from Holden.

Gauci and Matt Corby were the two contestants on the show's grand finale. At the conclusion of each series, a "Winner's Single" is released. The 2007 winner's single, "Here I Am", was written by Lindy Robbins and Tom Leonard, who had previously written for the Backstreet Boys. Both Corby and Gauci were critical of the track, with Gauci professing confusion as the demo version had male vocals – she adapted it to be consistent with her jazz music style. While Corby felt it was "not something I'd choose to release ... Yes, I'm being diplomatic. Even though this competition has made me look like I'm into pop, I'm really not". On 25 November 2007, Gauci was declared the winner of Australian Idol 2007. She became the first contestant to progress to the top 12 through a judges' lifeline and then win the competition.

=== Australian Idol performances ===
| Week | Theme | Song choice | Original artist | Result |
|---|---|---|---|---|
| Top 24 | Contestant's Choice | "Hurt" | Christina Aguilera | Wildcard |
| Wildcard | Contestant's Choice | "Feeling Good" | Cy Grant | Judge's choice |
| Top 12 | Contestant's Choice | "(Baby I've Got You) On My Mind" | Powderfinger | Safe |
| Top 11 | Rock | "Sweet Child o' Mine" | Guns N' Roses | Safe |
| Top 10 | Disco | "I Will Survive" | Gloria Gaynor | Safe |
| Top 9 | Acoustic | "Man in the Mirror" | Michael Jackson | Safe |
| Top 8 | Brit pop | "Rehab" | Amy Winehouse | Safe |
| Top 7 | Year you were born | "Endless Love" | Lionel Richie/Diana Ross | Safe |
| Top 6 | Judge's Choice – Hines; Contestant's Choice | "Nothing Compares 2 U" "Umbrella" | The Family; Rihanna | Safe, Touchdown |
| Top 5 | Australian Made | "Boys in Town" | Divinyls | Bottom 2, Touchdown |
| Top 4 | Big Band; Big Band | "Orange Colored Sky" "How High the Moon" | Janet Brace; Alfred Drake and Frances Comstock | Safe, Touchdown |
| Top 3 | Audience Choice; Contestant's Choice | "Ray of Light" "Nobody Knows" | Madonna; Pink | Safe |
| Finale | Contestant's Choice; Contestant's Choice; Winner's Single; Grand Final performance | "Apologize" "Running Up that Hill" "Here I Am" "Man in the Mirror" | OneRepublic; Kate Bush; Natalie Gauci; Michael Jackson | Winner |

== Recording career ==
=== 2007–2008: The Winner's Journey ===
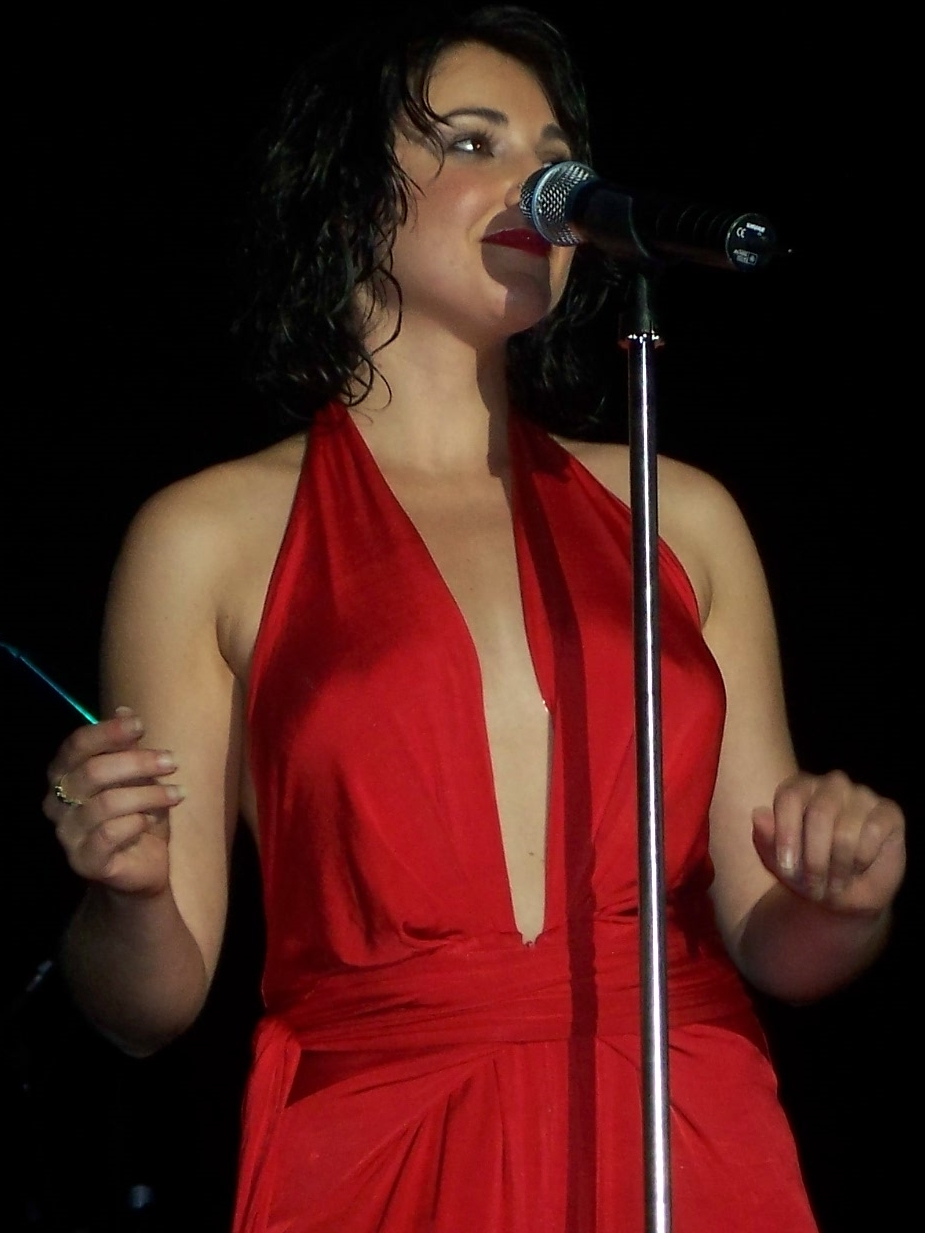
Gauci on her Winner's Journey Tour, January 2008.

On 25 November 2007 Natalie Gauci released her winner's single, "Here I Am", as a digital download. It was then issued as a CD single on 28 November 2007, which included as a B-side, her original track, "All in My Mind". "Here I Am" debuted on the ARIA Singles Chart at number two. It was the first debut single by an Australian Idol winner that did not reach number one. "Here I Am" sold 7,463 copies in its first week, lower than all previous winners' debut singles.

Her debut album, The Winner's Journey, was released on 8 December 2007. Unlike Damien Leith's Winners Journey of the previous year, Gauci's CD/DVD did not include Australian Idol stage performances. Instead it had an interview with John Foreman and recorded versions of the songs performed during her time on the show. This drew criticism with Fremantle Media, producers of Australian Idol, suggesting Gauci's record label, Sony BMG, had deliberately excluded the material. The album debuted on the ARIA Albums Chart at number twelve, before reaching its peak of number eleven in its second week on the chart. The album sold 11,489 copies in its first week, compared to Leith's 89,257 copies the previous year. Paul Cashmere of the Undercover website criticised the show for its commercialism, accusing it of using Gauci as a "victim to feed the corporations and their shareholders".

Sony BMG then released a second DVD titled, The Final Two, on 17 December 2007. It had separate performances on the show by Gauci and Corby. In January 2008 Gauci commenced her Winner's Journey Tour across Australia. She took three musicians from the Natalie Gauci Band, as well as a long time keyboard collaborator and music director, while she sang and played the piano.

=== 2009–2020: New label, Tune in Tokyo and solo ===
In August 2009 Natalie Gauci left Sony Music because "she felt pushed and prodded" by the label. In January 2010 Gauci collaborated with a European record label, Sorry Shoes, and issued a new single, "Without You", in May.

In 2010 Gauci formed Tune in Tokyo, an electro-pop and dance music band, with producer Paul Brandoli. As the group's lead singer, Gauci's look and sound had changed. She told the Daily Telegraph that she had changed her style after hanging out in Melbourne's gay dance clubs with musician, and her then-husband, Hamish Cowan (Cordrazine). Gauci explained, "That's where I came out of my shell. I didn't have anyone telling me what to do. Tune in Tokyo is just one part of what I want to do. We got a lot of feedback straight away, which was great because it gave me confidence about the project". On 4 November 2010 they released their debut single, "Dreamer", which peaked at No. 3 on the ARIA Clubs Chart. It was co-written by Brandoli and Gauci. She revealed that she was working on the group's debut album and that she had made a cameo for a 2011 film, Big Mamma's Boy, which stars actress, Holly Valance. Tune in Tokyo's second single, "Ray of Love", appeared in April 2012.

In 2011 Gauci travelled to Europe, where she worked with producers and DJ's, by August 2012 she had moved to London where she continued her recording and teaching music careers. She has performed under the name Nellie Bell from about 2013 to mid-2015.

During early 2012 Gauci toured Europe including Spain, Belgium, Italy, The Netherlands and Germany before settling in Sweden. There she co-wrote a new single, "Just Dance", with local songwriters, Jonas and Jeanette von der Burg, which was issued on Four on the Floor Records in May. The actual release of the single however, was ultimately cancelled. On 20 November an Italian duo of DJ-producers, Jack & Joy (aka Max Bondino and Luca Loi) issued their single, "We Are the Stars" featuring Gauci, on Adaptor Recordings. In July Gauci released her second studio album, a jazz effort, Ha Ha Ha, on The Gauch Records. In September she released an alternative-electronic EP, Elektrik Field.

In August 2017 she stated that she would release several EP:s, "over the coming months".

In 2020 she was a contestant in the ninth season of The Voice (Australian TV series), with the audition song "The Greatest" and choose team Guy. Gauci was eliminated in the battle rounds.

=== 2021–present: Brand New Day ===
In October 2021, Gauci released "Pictures of Mars", the lead single from her album of the same name, which was scheduled for release in 2022. However, Pictures of Mars was never released.

In July 2024, Gauci released the album Brand New Day. Gauci said, "It's my truth, my story, which I feel many people will relate to. It's about searching for love, faith and looking for hope." A children's book of the same name was also released.

== Personal life ==
On 28 March 2009 Gauci married Hamish Cowan, the lead singer of art rock band, Cordrazine. Gauci provided backing vocals for "Some Day We'll All Come Together" on Cordrazine's second album, Always Coming Down (August 2010). Cowan declared "I would love to do a duet with her, she inspires me and is my muse... Nat's passion and unwillingness to compromise her art and vision keeps me focused and betters me in every way."

The couple separated in March 2011 with Gauci announcing in June, "I married Hamish and he was really supportive and encouraging. He gave me confidence and courage to pursue what I wanted, and not what others wanted ... We had a strong and passionate relationship. Very intense. It didn't work out the way we planned ... Hamish and I have separated and decided not to get back together". Gauci's jazz album, Ha Ha Ha (July 2012), deals with the relationship, Sunday Herald Sun's Nui Te Koha reported that it would "detail Gauci's personal and professional highs and lows, including a split from her husband of two years". During the marriage (2009–11) she used the name Natalie Cowan.

Gauci had worked as a personal trainer for Australian Idol judge, Ian "Dicko" Dickson during 2009–10.

== Discography ==
Natalie Gauci discography
- Studio albums: 3
- Extended plays: 5
- Singles: 6

=== Studio albums ===
List of albums, with selected chart positions and certifications
| Title | Album details | Peak chart positions | Certifications |
| Title | Album details | AUS | Certifications |
|---|---|---|---|
| The Winner's Journey | Released: 8 December 2007; Format: CD, digital download; Label: Sony Music Australia | 11 | ARIA: Platinum |
| Ha Ha Ha | Released: 1 July 2012; Format: Digital; Label: The Gauch | — | |
| Brand New Day | Released: 5 July 2024; Format: Digital; Label: Natalie Gauci | — | |
| Pictures of Mars | Released: April 2025; Format: Digital; Label: Natalie Gauci | — | |
"—" denotes releases that did not chart.

=== Extended plays ===
List of EPs, with selected details
| Title | EP details |
|---|---|
| Take It or Leave It | Released: 2006; Format: CD, digital download; Label: Independent |
| I'm Ready | Released: 25 June 2010; Format: Digital download; Label: Rubber Music |
| Free Falling | Released: 2 January 2011; Format: Digital download |
| Elektrik Field | Released: 3 September 2012; Format: Digital download; Label: The Gauch |
| Pictures of Mars: Part 1 – Back to Life | Released: June 2017; Format: Digital download; Label: Independent |
| Happiness | Released: 24 April 2020; Format: Digital download, streaming; Label: NATG |

=== Singles ===
List of singles, with selected chart positions and certifications, showing year released and album name
| Title | Year | Peak chart positions | Certifications | Album |
| Title | Year | AUS | Certifications | Album |
|---|---|---|---|---|
| "Here I Am" | 2007 | 2 | ARIA: Gold | The Winner's Journey |
| "Without You" | 2010 | — | | Non-album singles |
| "C U Later" | 2011 | — | | Non-album singles |
| "Pictures of Mars" | 2021 | — | | Non-album singles |
| "I Thought It Was You" | 2024 | — | | Brand New Day |
| "Fame" | 2024 | — | | Brand New Day |
| "How You Feel" | 2024 | — | | Brand New Day |
| "In My Head" | 2024 | — | | Brand New Day |
| "Smile" | 2024 | — | | |
| "Back to Life" | 2025 | — | | |
| "We've All Been Here Before" | 2025 | — | | |
| "Optical Illusion" | 2025 | — | | |
| "I Survived" | 2025 | — | | |
| "Brand New Day" | 2026 | — | | |
"—" denotes releases that did not chart.

==== As featured artist ====
List of featured singles
| Title | Year |
|---|---|
| "We Are the Stars" (Jack & Joy featuring Natalie Gauci) | 2012 |
| "Part Time Lover" (Voltaxx & Mike Kelly featuring Natalie Gauci) | 2012 |
| "Kandy Kandy" (Alexander Fog featuring Natalie Gauci) | 2013 |

== Awards and nominations ==
=== AIR Awards ===
The Australian Independent Record Awards (commonly known informally as AIR Awards) is an annual awards night to recognise, promote and celebrate the success of Australia's Independent Music sector.

| Year | Nominee / work | Award | Result | Ref. |
|---|---|---|---|---|
| 2026 | Pictures of Mars | Best Independent Jazz Album or EP | Nominated | |

| Preceded by Damien Leith | Australian Idol winner Season 5 (2007) | Succeeded by Wes Carr |
