= Culture shock (disambiguation) =

Culture shock is the feeling of anxiety when operating within a different culture.

Culture shock may also refer to:

== People ==
- Culture Shock (musician), born James Pountney, a drum and bass artist signed to RAM Records

== Art, entertainment, and media ==
=== Music ===
- Culture Shock (album), the second album by the American comedy band Da Yoopers
- Culture Shock (band), a band featuring members of the bands Citizen Fish and Subhumans
- Culture Shock (group), an Australian dance group from the 1990s
- "Culture Shock", the 8th track on the Exmilitary mixtape, by the American hip hop group Death Grips
- "Culture Shock", a song on the 1985 album Soul Kiss by singer Olivia Newton-John

=== Radio ===
- Culture Shock (BBC World Service), a BBC World Service programme about the "latest global trends and ideas driving human behaviour"

=== Television ===
- "Culture Shock (Sam & Max)", season 1, episode 1 of the Sam & Max game series
- "Culture Shock" (SpongeBob SquarePants), a season 1 episode of SpongeBob SquarePants
- WWE Culture Shock, a documentary series by a former WWE champion
- "Culture Shock" (Into the Dark), an episode of the first season of Into the Dark
