= The Winner's Journey =

The Winner's Journey may refer to:

- The Winner's Journey (Damien Leith album), a 2006 live album by Damien Leith
- The Winner's Journey (Natalie Gauci album), a 2007 studio album by Natalie Gauci
