= Australian Idol season 5 =

Australian Idol
- Season 5
- Hosted by: Andrew G James Mathison
- Judges: Mark Holden; Ian Dickson; Marcia Hines; Kyle Sandilands
- Winner: Natalie Gauci
- Runner-up: Matt Corby
- Finals venue: Fox Studios, Sydney; Sydney Opera House (Grand Final)

Release
- Original network: Network Ten
- Original release: 5 August – 25 November 2007

Season chronology
- ← Previous; Season 4 Next → Season 6

- Australian Idol (season 5)
- Contestants
Natalie Gauci	Winner
Matt Corby	Runner-up
Carl Riseley	12 November
Marty Simpson	5 November
Tarisai Vushe	29 October
Daniel Mifsud	22 October
Ben McKenzie	15 October
Jacob Butler	8 October
Mark Da Costa	1 October
Lana Krost	24 September
Brianna Carpenter	17 September
Holly Weinert	10 September

The fifth season of Australian Idol premiered on 5 August 2007 on Network Ten. It concluded on 25 November.

== Overview ==
=== Format changes ===
The series was again hosted by Andrew G and James Mathison, with Ian "Dicko" Dickson returning to the show as one of the judges, along with Mark Holden, Marcia Hines and Kyle Sandilands. The show continued with the new format from Season 4, where contestants were permitted to perform original material for their audition and throughout the season, and play instruments as part of their performances.

=== Ratings ===
The premiere episode of the 2007 series had 1.65 million viewers, making it the show's second highest rating series opener and 270,000 ahead of last year. The show was in the top ten most viewed shows for the early part of the series and eventually dropped to around number eighteen and nineteen for quite some time due to hot competition from Channel 7's Kath & Kim. The season was on a low compared to Season 4. The Top 5 performance show marked the re-commencement of higher ratings for the program and it reached number nine.

== Auditions ==
The auditions for Australian Idol (season 5) were run from March to May 2007. They were held in:

- Kalgoorlie on 3 March
- Bunbury on 6 March
- Coffs Harbour on 10 March
- Dubbo on 14 March
- Canberra on 18 March
- Wollongong on 20 March
- Newcastle on 25 March
- Launceston on 31 March
- Hobart on 1 April
- Wagga Wagga on 3 April
- Darwin on 14 April
- Rockhampton on 19 April
- Brisbane on 21 April and 22
- Perth on 29 April
- Mildura on 4 May
- Adelaide on 6 May
- Melbourne on 12 May 13 and 14
- Sydney on 19 May 20 and 21

== Theatre Week (Seymour Centre) ==
As in previous years, the theatre week, held at Sydney's Seymour Centre, consisted of three gruelling elimination rounds. For the first round, each contestant singing a cappella one song of their choice in front of the judges, before being told, based on that performance, whether they would be moving onto the next round.

The second round, (for the first time in Australian Idol history), the group rounds consisted of two boys and two girls, instead of a same gender group, as in previous seasons. Contestants were once again told whether they would be moving onto the next round based on these performances.

In the third and final round, each contestant was then to perform a song choice of their own choosing, in a solo performance in front of the judges and every other contestant. Based on these performances, each contestant was told, one at a time, whether they would become a part of the Top 24, or if their journey would end.

== Semi-finals ==
The semi-finals were run to the same format as the fourth season, with four groups of six performing solo in a live studio on Sunday, Monday, Tuesday and Wednesday night. On the Thursday night, the first eight finalists through to the Top 12 were announced, along with another eight of the remaining 24 chosen for the Wildcard show. These eight would be given a second chance to prove themselves worthy of one of the four remaining spots in the Top 12. The following Sunday night the wildcards would perform again with the results revealed on the Monday night.

The semi-finalists for 2007 were:

Females	Males
Brianna Carpenter	Lyall Adonis
Jesse Curran	David Andrews
Cheray Doughty	Jacob Butler*
Natalie Gauci	Jack Byrnes
Morgan Hosking	Matt Corby
Lana Krost	Mark Da Costa
Sarah Lloyde	Ben McKenzie
Madison Pritchett	Daniel Mifsud
Rosie Ribbons	Carl Riseley
Sally Van Der Zwart	Marty Simpson
Tarisai Vushe	Husny Thalib
Holly Weinert	Junior To'o

- Butler was a former contestant on the first series of The X Factor Australia. The 10 network allowed him to audition for Australian Idol.

== Weekly Song Themes ==
Date	Theme
10 September	Contestant's Choice
17 September	Rock
24 September	Disco
1 October	Acoustic
8 October	Brit Pop
15 October	The Year You Were Born
22 October	Judges'/ Contestant's Choice
29 October	Australian Made
5 November	Big Band
12 November	Audience / Contestant's Choice
25 November	The Grand Finale

== The Top 12 Contestants ==
=== Carl Riseley ===
Carl Riseley (born 21 December 1982) was a 25-year-old from Sydney. He was advanced by the four judges to the final 12 through the Wildcard show. He has been awarded one "touchdown" from Mark Holden. Before Idol, Carl was a member of the Royal Australian Navy, where he plays the trumpet in the Navy Band. Carl was the final eliminee on 12 November 2007 when Natalie Gauci and Matt Corby proceeded into the Grand Final. He has a younger brother called Anthony. He is currently signed to Universal Records and will release his debut album The Rise in April 2008. Carl Riseley vocally supported axed judge Mark Holden on his departure in March 2008. Carl is referred to as the "swing king" and has been marketed in a Tom Jones type way.

Audition:
Theatre Week (Round 1):
Theatre Week (Round 3):
Top 24: "Home" by Michael Bublé
Wildcard Show: "Bye Bye Love" by The Everly Brothers
Top 12 (Contestant's Choice): "Waltzing Matilda" by Banjo Paterson
Top 11 (Rock): "Clocks" by Coldplay
Top 10 (Disco): "September" by Earth, Wind & Fire
Top 9 (Acoustic): "It's Alright with Me" by Harry Connick, Jr.
Top 8 (Brit Pop): "Can't Buy Me Love" by The Beatles ~ Bottom 2
Top 7 (The Year You Were Born): "Turn Your Love Around" by George Benson
Top 6 (Judge's Choice):: "It's Not Unusual" by Tom Jones – (Ian "Dicko" Dickson) ~ TOUCHDOWN!
Top 6 (Contestant's Choice): "Jealous Guy" by John Lennon
Top 5 (Australian Made): "Reminiscing" by Little River Band
Top 4 (Big Band): "Just Kiss Me" by Harry Connick, Jr.
Top 4 (Big Band): "Me and Mrs Jones" by Billy Paul
Top 3 (Audience Choice): "You Give Me Something" by James Morrison
Top 3 (Contestant's Choice): "For Once in My Life" by Stevie Wonder

=== Marty Simpson ===
Marty Simpson is a 21-year-old from the Central Coast, New South Wales. He plays guitar, writes his own songs and has been described as a "bloke's bloke" by Mark Holden. Before Idol, he worked with his father as a bricklayer. He was eliminated on 5 November 2007. Marty was described by judges as lazy, something which he himself acknowledged. He finished in 4th place, and was in the bottom appearance four times before being eliminated. Although not initially named by Today Tonight as vote-rigging, he was later named and subsequently became the 4th in a row named that was eliminated. On leaving, Marty Simpson stated that he had been approached by Sony BMG in relation to a recording contract.

Audition:
Theatre Week (Round 1):
Theatre Week (Round 3):
Top 24: "Over My Head (Cable Car)" by The Fray
Top 12 (Contestant's Choice): "Can't Stand Losing You" by The Police
Top 11 (Rock): "Jenny Don't Be Hasty" by Paolo Nutini – Bottom 2
Top 10 (Disco): "You Sexy Thing" by Hot Chocolate
Top 9 (Acoustic): "Open Your Eyes" by Snow Patrol
Top 8 (Brit Pop): "Naïve" by The Kooks
Top 7 (The Year You Were Born): "Now We're Getting Somewhere" by Crowded House ~ Bottom 3
Top 6 (Judge's Choice):: "No Woman, No Cry" by Bob Marley – (Marcia Hines)
Top 6 (Contestant's Choice): "Last Kiss" by Pearl Jam ~ Bottom 3
Top 5 (Australian Made): "These Days" by Powderfinger ~
Top 4 (Big Band): "Light My Fire" by The Doors
Top 4 (Big Band): "American Baby" by Dave Matthews Band

=== Tarisai Vushe ===
Tarisai Vushe (born 29 March 1987) is a Zimbabwe born, 23-year-old who auditioned in Sydney, New South Wales. Before Idol, she worked in her family store and studied psychology at university, while attending Hillsong Church affiliate Shirelive Church . She was eliminated on 29 October 2007. She was known for her powerful vocals, which were described by the judges at audition and throughout the series as "sending shivers down the spine" when she sang. She was awarded one touchdown by Mark Holden. She was criticised by judges the last few weeks before eviction. She sang at the Sydney New Year's Eve concert, performed an original song at a Sydney Martial Arts contest in January 2008 and in March 2008 she went on tour with South African band Malaika and toured in Macao (China) in September 2008. The debut single "Head Over Heels" was released in March 2010 which got nominated at the Afro-Australian Music and Movie Awards for the Best single of the year and the best vocalist 2010 where she won both awards. In 2011 she starred on an American TV show Killer instinct as Muggy. In 2013 she starred on American's deadly women. She is currently signed to Disney and performing on the Lion King Australian tour.

Audition: "I Have Nothing" by Whitney Houston
Theatre Week (Round 1):
Theatre Week (Round 3):
Top 24: "River Deep - Mountain High" by Ike & Tina Turner
Top 12 (Contestant's Choice): "If I Was Your Woman" by Alicia Keys
Top 11 (Rock): "Hard to Handle" by The Black Crowes
Top 10 (Disco): "Hot Stuff" by Donna Summer ~ Bottom 2
Top 9 (Acoustic): "Kissing You" by Des'ree
Top 8 (Brit Pop): "Somebody to Love" by Queen ~ TOUCHDOWN!
Top 7 (The Year You Were Born): "I Knew You Were Waiting (For Me)" by Aretha Franklin and George Michael
Top 6 (Judge's Choice):: "Can't Get Enough of Your Love" by Taylor Dayne – (Marcia Hines) ~ Bottom 2
Top 6 (Contestant's Choice): "I Believe in You and Me" by Whitney Houston ~ Bottom 2
Top 5 (Australian Made): "When It All Falls Apart" by The Veronicas

=== Daniel Mifsud ===
Daniel Mifsud is a 23-year-old from Sydney, New South Wales. He was advanced by the public to the final 12 through the Wildcard Show. He has been awarded one "touchdown" from Mark Holden. Before Idol, Daniel was a music teacher in a primary school. Daniel was eliminated on 22 October 2007.

Audition:
Theatre Week (Round 1):
Theatre Week (Round 3):
Top 24: "Tip of My Tongue" by Diesel
Wildcard Show: "Lay Your Love on Me" by Roachford
Top 12 (Contestant's Choice): "Cry Me a River" by Justin Timberlake
Top 11 (Rock): "Fire" by Jimi Hendrix
Top 10 (Disco): "Miss You" by The Rolling Stones ~ Bottom 3
Top 9 (Acoustic): "I Was Made for Lovin' You" by Kiss ~ TOUCHDOWN!, Bottom 3
Top 8 (Brit Pop): "Message in a Bottle" by The Police ~ Bottom 3
Top 7 (The Year You Were Born): "Billie Jean" by Michael Jackson
Top 6 (Judge's Choice): "Fragile" by Sting (musician) – (Mark Holden)
Top 6 (Contestant's Choice): "From the Sea" by Eskimo Joe

=== Ben McKenzie ===
Ben McKenzie (born 24 July 1990) is from Gosford, on the Central Coast of New South Wales. Ben was a favourite to win the competition until he was eliminated on 15 October 2007 which led to judge Marcia Hines threatening to quit the show in relation to his eviction and the treatment of him by the other 3 judges. Ben was falsely named by Today Tonight as being involved in "vote-rigging" and was the first of 4 in a row who were eliminated. He had never been in the bottom 3 until his elimination night. Ben performed at Sydney's New Year's Eve concert to end 2007. Ben has composed many original songs which he has been performing at small shows around Sydney & the Central Coast of NSW. He has also traveled to perform in Melbourne. Ben's film production company Dreams Unleashed Productions has completed filming and editing his first feature-length film, 'Submerged (Feature Film)(2011)'. The film is a unique combination of horror and supernatural thriller, drawing influences from The Ring and Silent Hill and was released on YouTube January 2012. The soundtrack includes music written by Ben.

Audition:
Theatre Week (Round 1):
Theatre Week (Round 3):
Top 24: Mad World" by Tears for Fears
Top 12 (Contestant's Choice): "Sunday Morning" by Maroon 5
Top 11 (Rock): "Bodies" by Little Birdy
Top 10 (Disco): "Don't Stop 'Til You Get Enough" by Michael Jackson
Top 9 (Acoustic): "Hide and Seek" by Imogen Heap
Top 8 (Brit Pop): "Wonderwall" by Oasis
Top 7 (The Year You Were Born): "Higher Ground" by Red Hot Chili Peppers

=== Jacob Butler ===
Jacob Butler first auditioned for Australian Idol in 2005, but failed to make it past the Top 100 Group Performances. Jacob reached sixth place in the Australian version of The X Factor television series in the same year. Jacob tried out for Idol again at the 2007 auditions, singing "Don't Look Back In Anger" by Oasis. The Judges were impressed by his improvement in both his songwriting and musicianship. He was soon placed into the Top 24. Australia made him their second top 12 finalist after his rendition of Snow Patrol's "Chasing Cars". Jacob was eliminated on 8 October 2007. His last performance on Idol was on Brit Pop night. He performed The Beatles hit "Let It Be". At the end of 2007, Jacob performed at the Sydney New Year's Eve Concert alongside fellow Idol contestants Ben McKenzie and Tarisai Vushe. Since Idol, Jacob has released his debut album "Reason" in Germany and other countries across Europe. The album was released in Australia and New Zealand in August 2013.

Audition: "Don't Look Back In Anger" by Oasis
Theatre Week (Round 1): Chocolate by Snow Patrol
Theatre Week (Round 3): Across the Universe by The Beatles
Top 24: Chasing Cars by Snow Patrol
Top 12 (Contestant's Choice): When You Were Young by The Killers
Top 11 (Rock): "Morning Glory" by Oasis
Top 10 (Disco): "Canned Heat" by Jamiroquai
Top 9 (Acoustic): "Somewhere Only We Know" by Keane ~ Bottom 2
Top 8 (Brit Pop): "Let It Be" by The Beatles

=== Mark Da Costa ===
Mark Da Costa is a 28-year-old from Sydney, thus was the oldest finalist. He was advanced by the public to the final 12 through the Wildcard show. He was eliminated on 1 October 2007, finishing in 9th place. Although already eliminated, Mark was named by Today Tonight as being involved in vote-rigging. Since leaving Idol, Mark da Costa has gone back to performing regularly, and has been on tour with his band for most of 2008.

Audition:
Theatre Week (Round 1):
Theatre Week (Round 3):
Top 24: "Whole Lotta Love" by Led Zeppelin
Wildcard Show: "Evie (Part 1)" by Stevie Wright
Top 12 (Contestant's Choice): "Vertigo" by U2
Top 11 (Rock): "High Voltage" by AC/DC
Top 10 (Disco): "Nutbush City Limits" by Ike & Tina Turner
Top 9 (Acoustic): "Yellow" by Coldplay

=== Lana Krost ===
Lana Krost is a 17-year-old student from Western Australia. She auditioned in Perth. She is adopted and her birth mother was a Vietnamese opera singer who travelled around China singing with her grandparents. She was eliminated on 24 September 2007. Since leaving Idol, Lana graduated from her high school St Hilda's Anglican School for Girls and is currently attending WAAPA doing a contemporary music course.

Audition:
Theatre Week (Round 1):
Theatre Week (Round 3):
Top 24: "Big Girls Don't Cry" by Fergie
Top 12 (Contestant's Choice): "Shiver" by Natalie Imbruglia ~ Bottom 2
Top 11 (Rock): "Come On, Come On" by Little Birdy
Top 10 (Disco): "Sing It Back" by Moloko

=== Brianna Carpenter ===
Brianna Carpenter is a 21-year-old from Brisbane, Queensland. Before Idol, Brianna was studying music production at the Conservatorium. She was eliminated on 17 September 2007.

Audition: Jacqueline (Brianna Carpenter original)
Theatre Week (Round 1):
Theatre Week (Round 3):
Top 24: "Fidelity" by Regina Spektor
Top 12 (Contestant's Choice): "God Only Knows" by The Beach Boys ~ Bottom 3
Top 11 (Rock): "The Logical Song" by Supertramp

=== Holly Weinert ===
Holly Weinert (born 23 April 1987) is a 20-year-old from Mildura, Victoria. Before Idol, Holly worked in a bar in Mildura. She was eliminated on 10 September 2007, finishing in 12th place.

Audition: "Sunday Morning" by No Doubt
Theatre Week (Round 1):
Theatre Week (Round 3): "Blackbird" by The Beatles
Top 24: "Easy" by Commodores
Top 12 (Contestant's Choice): "Standing in the Way of Control" by Gossip

== Elimination chart ==
Females	Males	Top 12	Winner

Safe	Safe First	Safe Last	Eliminated

Stage:		Finals										
Week:		10/9	17/9	24/9	1/10	8/10	15/10	22/10	29/10	5/11	12/11	25/11
Place	Contestant	Result										
1	Natalie Gauci								Bottom 2			Winner
2	Matt Corby						Bottom 2					Runner-up
3	Carl Riseley					Bottom 2				Bottom 2	Elim	
4	Marty Simpson		Bottom 2				Bottom 3	Bottom 3		Elim		
5	Tarisai Vushe			Bottom 2				Bottom 2	Elim			
6	Daniel Mifsud			Bottom 3	Bottom 3	Bottom 3		Elim				
7	Ben McKenzie						Elim					
8	Jacob Butler		Bottom 3		Bottom 2	Elim						
9	Mark DaCosta				Elim							
10	Lana Krost	Bottom 2		Elim								
11	Brianna Carpenter	Bottom 3	Elim									
12	Holly Weinert	Elim										

== Doing It for the Kids ==
On 19 October 2007, there was a special Australian Idol telecast, "Doing It For The Kids", to raise money for Ronald McDonald House and Telstra Child Flight. Based on the American Idol special "Idol Gives Back", the Top 6 performed, as well as other artists.

Top 6:

- Carl Riseley – "Pure Imagination" from Willy Wonka & the Chocolate Factory
- Daniel Mifsud – "Waiting on the World to Change" by John Mayer
- Marty Simpson – "I Won't Back Down" by Tom Petty
- Matt Corby – "Bedouin Song" by Lior
- Natalie Gauci – "Crazy" by Gnarls Barkley
- Tarisai Vushe – "Ooh Child" by Five Stairsteps
- Top 6 Group Performance – "Kids" by Robbie Williams & Kylie Minogue

Special Guests:

- Damien Leith – "Songbird" originally by Fleetwood Mac
- Shannon Noll – "In Pieces"
- Young Divas – "If I Can't Have You" originally by Yvonne Elliman
- Darren Hayes – "Me, Myself and (I)"
- Vanessa Amorosi – "Kiss Your Mama!"
- Rogue Traders – "Don't You Wanna Feel"
- Katie Noonan – "Send Out A Little Love"

== Results show performances ==
1. Special Performance – "22 Steps" by Damien Leith
2. Top 12 – "Kids" by Robbie Williams and Kylie Minogue – (Contestant's Choice)
3. Top 11 – "Smoke on the Water" by Deep Purple – (Rock)
4. Special Performance – "Undiscovered" by Anthony Callea, originally by James Morrison
5. Top 10 – "Can You Feel It" by The Jacksons – (Disco)
6. Top 9 with Ian Moss – "Choir Girl" by Cold Chisel – (Acoustic)
7. Special Performance – "Never Again" by Kelly Clarkson
8. Special Performance – "All I Want Is You" by Damien Leith
9. Top 8 – "You Really Got Me" by The Kinks – (Brit pop)
10. Top 7 – Medley "I Shot The Sheriff" by Eric Clapton and "Psycho Killer" by Talking Heads – (Year of birth)
11. Special Performance – "What's Next to the Moon" by Chris Murphy, originally by AC/DC
12. Top 6 – "Kiss" by Prince – (Judge's Choice)
13. Special Performance – "Turn Me Loose" by Young Divas, originally by Loverboy
14. Special Performance – "Love Is All Around" by Ricki-Lee Coulter, originally by Agnes Carlsson
15. Top 5 – "April Sun in Cuba" by Dragon – (Australian Hits!)
16. Special Performance – Guy Sebastian originally by Various Artists
17. Top 4 – "I Saw Her Standing There" by The Beatles – (Big Band)
18. Special Performance – "Believe Again" by Delta Goodrem
19. Special Performance – "Everybody Hurts" by Marcia Hines, originally by R.E.M.

== Grand Finale performances ==
1. Special Performance – "Turn Me Loose" by Young Divas, originally by Loverboy
2. Special Performance – "All I Want Is You" by Damien Leith
3. Special Performance – "In Pieces" by Shannon Noll
4. Special Performance – "Boys in Town" by Divinyls
5. Special Performance – Winner of Pascall My Mum Rocks Competition
6. Special Performance – "I Never Liked You" by Rogue Traders
7. Special Performance – "All Night Long (All Night)" by Lionel Richie with Top 12 and State Schools Singers Choir
8. Top 12 – A medley of songs and "Hands Open", originally by Snow Patrol
9. Matt Corby – "Bitter Sweet Symphony", originally by The Verve
10. Natalie Gauci – "Here I Am" and "Man in the Mirror", originally by Michael Jackson

== Commercial Releases ==
The day following the Grand Finale, Australian Idol Season 5 Winner Natalie Gauci released the winner's single "Here I Am". The single debuted at No. 2 on the ARIA Charts behind hugely popular international act Timbaland. The single was considered to have sold not as well as expected with only 8,000 copies sold in its first week. Its second week it stayed put at No. 2 and sales proved better with close to 11,000 copies sold making a total of 19,000 copies sold. Also in its second week the single was certified with Gold status. In its third week it dropped to No. 7 and its fourth week dropped down to No. 18. It fell into even greater obscurity in its fifth week dropping down to No. 29. Its sixth week fared better with No. 27.

Natalie's debut album, The Winner's Journey, was released on 8 December 2007. In its first week it debuted on the charts at No. 12 and sold just over 11,000 copies. It was also certified with Platinum status meaning 70,000 units were shipped off, but going by sales figures the album did not meet these expected sales. In its second week it moved up to No. 11 and total sales figures bumped up to just over 18,000. In its third week Natalie's album stayed at No. 11 and sales reached just under 20,000 copies. Its fourth week was a disappointing week with the album dropping down to No. 18. In its fifth week it reached No. 19.

Preceded by Season 4 (2006)	Australian Idol; Season 5 (2007)	Succeeded by Season 6 (2008)
