= Here I Am (Natalie Gauci song) =

Single by Natalie Gauci

from the album The Winner's Journey
- Released: 26 November 2007 (Digital); 28 November 2007 (CD)
- Recorded: Kings Cross Studio, Sydney, 2007
- Genre: Pop
- Length: 3:50
- Label: Sony BMG
- Songwriters: Lindy Robbins; Tom Leonard

Natalie Gauci singles chronology
"Here I Am" (2007)	"Without You" (2010)

"Here I Am" is the debut single by 2007 Australian Idol winner Natalie Gauci, written by Lindy Robbins and Tom Leonard. The single was performed by the final two contestants – Gauci and Matt Corby – during the penultimate episode of Australian Idol 2007.

After Gauci won the competition on 25 November 2007, the song was available online through BigPond Music, a major sponsor of Australian Idol. The single was released as a CD single on 28 November 2007.

== Background ==
Natalie Gauci was at first confused when she heard the demo, as it only contained male vocals. She realised that the writers of the song also wrote songs for the Backstreet Boys, and decided to make an overhaul of the song to record her own version. "Now the song sounds like I wrote it, I reckon," she says. "I feel very proud."

Before the Australian Idol grand final, it was reported that both Gauci and Idol runner up Matt Corby had originally panned the winner's single and were unimpressed after hearing the demo of the song.

Matt Corby was most uncomfortable with the song, who says that the pop song is "cheesy". "This competition has made me look like I'm into pop, but I'm not," he says. He stated that the song was not the direction he was going to take, and wants to take a creative control for his music, as blues and roots was his most passionate music style. "It's so far away from what I would release or write, but I have to cop it on the chin – it's part of the competition," he states.

Top 3 finalist Carl Riseley had also performed a version of "Here I Am" with a swing style. He commented that his version sounded "bloody horrible".

== Commercial performance ==
"Here I Am" was the first Australian Idol winner's single to not debut in the No. 1 position on the Australian Singles Chart. "Here I Am" sold 7,463 copies in its first week, lower than all previous Australian Idol winners' singles. The single was certified Gold for shipments of 35,000 in its second week on the chart.

== Track listing ==
- CD single
1. "Here I Am" (Lindy Robbins, Tom Leonard) – 3:50
2. "All in My Mind" (Natalie Gauci, James Kempster) – 3:46

== Charts and certifications ==
=== Charts ===
Chart (2007)	Peak position
Australia (ARIA)	2

=== Certifications ===
Region	Certification	Certified units/sales
Australia (ARIA)	Gold	35,000^{^}
^{^} Shipments figures based on certification alone.

== See also ==
- List of Australian Idol commercial releases
