= Dreamer (Tune in Tokyo song) =

Single by Tune in Tokyo
- Released: 4 November 2010
- Genre: Pop, dance
- Length: 3:11
- Label: Onelove
- Songwriter(s): Natalie Gauci, Paul Brandoli

Tune in Tokyo singles chronology
| "Dreamer" (2010) | "Ray of Love" (2012) |

"Dreamer" is the debut single by Australian dance duo Tune in Tokyo. The single was released in November 2010 and reached #3 on the ARIA Club Charts.

== Background ==
Tune in Tokyo was first formed by Natalie Gauci and Paul Brandoli in 2010 after Gauci was inspired hanging out in Melbourne's gay dance clubs with musician, and her then-husband, Hamish Cowan (Cordrazine).

== Track listing ==
- Radio Edits single
1. "Dreamer" (Radio Edit) — 3:11
2. "Dreamer" (Javi Mula Radio Edit) — 3:03
- Remixes single
1. "Dreamer" (Javi Mula Remix) — 5:00
2. "Dreamer" (Original Mix) — 6:18
3. "Dreamer" (Benny Royal Remix) — 6:02
4. "Dreamer" (Nick Galea Remix) — 7:07
5. "Dreamer" (Antoine Dessante Remix) — 7:11
6. "Dreamer" (Sgt Slick Remix) — 5:49
7. "Dreamer" (Phonatics Remix) — 6:46
8. "Dreamer" (Benny Royal Dub) — 6:02

== Charts ==
| Chart (2010) | Peak position |
|---|---|
| Australia (ARIA Club Tracks) | 3 |
