= Australian citizenship affirmation =

The Australian citizenship affirmation is a short statement that enables Australian citizens to publicly display their pride in being Australian.

The affirmation is based on the pledge of commitment made by new citizens at their Australian citizenship ceremony. It allows Australian-born citizens to publicly make the same commitment.

Citizenship is a unifying symbol in Australia's culturally diverse society. The affirmation provides a means of expressing that unity.

== Text ==
The Australian citizenship affirmation states:

As an Australian citizen^{†}
I affirm my loyalty to Australia and its people,
Whose democratic beliefs I share,
Whose rights and liberties I respect,
And whose laws I uphold and obey.

^{†}People who are not yet Australian citizens but feel a strong connection to Australia may join in at the second line.

== History ==
Affirmation ceremonies were introduced in 1999 as part of the 50th anniversary of Australian citizenship celebrations. Until then, the only Australian citizens who made a pledge of commitment to Australia, its people and its civic principles were those who became citizens at Australian citizenship ceremonies.

The affirmation proved popular with ceremony participants and the Australian Citizenship Council (1998–2001) received submissions from members of the public who supported the continuation of affirmation ceremonies beyond the 50th anniversary celebrations. The council recommended that affirmation ceremonies be included in appropriate formal civic occasions hosted by state, territory and local governments and noted that the Centenary of Federation in 2001 would provide further appropriate opportunities for affirmation ceremonies to be conducted.

The 1999 National Schools Constitutional Convention delegates also expressed support for the concept of voluntary affirmation ceremonies for all Australians as a means of enhancing awareness of Australian citizenship.

The Australian Government supported the continuation of affirmation ceremonies for Australian citizens beyond the 50th anniversary of Australian citizenship (1999) and Centenary of Federation (2001) celebrations, noting that participation in affirmation ceremonies should be voluntary, have no legal status and be conducted with dignity and respect.

== Australian citizenship affirmation ceremonies ==
Australian citizenship affirmation ceremonies can be hosted by any Australian citizen. They are often held in conjunction with an Australian citizenship ceremony but can also be celebrated as a separate ceremony.

Affirmation ceremonies may be included as part of civic occasions, community events, school assemblies or on days of national significance such as Australia Day (26 January), Harmony Week (held during the week that includes 21 March, which is the United Nations International Day for the Elimination of Racial Discrimination), and Australian Citizenship Day (17 September).

The National Australia Day Council encourages the inclusion of Australian citizenship affirmation ceremonies as part of Australia Day celebrations.

Affirmation ceremonies are conducted according to the guidelines outlined in the Australian Citizenship Ceremonies Code.

== See also ==
- Department of Home Affairs
- Pledge of Allegiance (United States), a similar concept in the United States
