= Australia Day Live Concert =

Music festival

Coordinates: 35.308°S 149.125°E

Australia Day Live
- Genre: Pop and rock music
- Dates: 25 January Australia Day Eve; 26 January Australia Day
- Locations: Parliament House, Canberra and Sydney, Australia
- Years active: 2004–present
- Website: Official website

Australia Day Live is a concert which is hosted each year on Australia Day, on 26 January at the forecourt of the Sydney Opera House and Sydney Harbour. The concert features music from Australian artists and musicians.

== History ==
The "Australia Day Live" concert was first launched in 2004, on Federation Mall, the lawns of Parliament House in Canberra, Australia and originally hosted each year on 25 January, on the eve of Australia Day. Australia Day Live was preceded by the Australian of the Year Awards. The name of the concert was changed in 2012 to "Australia Celebrates Live".

=== Australia Celebrates Live Concert ===
"Australia Celebrates Live" was a free concert which included tributes to the outgoing Australians of the Year, with songs chosen by the previous Australians of the Year. This was followed by the Australian of the Year Awards ceremony. Once the Awards ceremony was complete, the concert continued with each artist performing a full set of music. In August 2016, the National Australia Day Council announced that the Australia Celebrates Live concert had been cancelled and from 2017, the Australian of the Year Awards would be held indoors at Parliament House.

=== Australia Day Concert ===
From 2014, the Australia Day Concert was staged on the forecourt of the Sydney Opera House from 7.30pm – 9.30pm with Sydney Harbour as a backdrop. In 2014 and 2015, the evening concert followed a morning concert on the Forecourt featuring the Wiggles. From 2015–2018 the Australia Day Concert was broadcast live nationally on Channel Ten. From 2019 the concert has been broadcast nationally on ABC TV. From 2018, the whole of Circular Quay was activated, effectively moving and enhancing the Darling Harbour Australia Day Spectacular on 26 January.

From 2017, when the Australian of the Year Awards were held in Canberra on 25 January, the Australia Day Concert continued as a separate event in Sydney on 26 January.

=== Australia Day Live ===
From 2019, the Australia Day Live name was revived for the concert and was now broadcast on the ABC.

== Lineups ==
=== 2004 ===
Shannon Noll, DJ Armee

=== 2005 ===
Icehouse, Australian Idol 2004 finalists

=== 2006 ===
Russell Crowe and the Ordinary Fear of God, Rogue Traders, Jade MacRae

=== 2007 ===
Guy Sebastian, The Whitlams, TV Rock, Hi-5, The Audreys, Bobby Flynn, Renee Geyer, Sick Puppies, Deborah Conway, Kate Miller-Heidke, Mia Dyson, Damien Leith

=== 2008 ===
Ben Lee, Thirsty Merc, The Basics, Tripod, Katie Noonan, The Veronicas, Richard Clapton, Gotye, Ricki Lee, Blue King Brown

=== 2009 ===
John Schumann and the Vagabond Crew,Trial Kennedy, Lovers Electric, Jessica Mauboy, Natalie Bassingthwaighte, Dan Kelly & the UkeLadies, Wendy Matthews, Gurrumul, Brian Cadd

=== 2010 ===
Cassie Davis, Ian Moss, Bertie Blackman, Bob Evans, Phrase, Hayley Warner, Evermore, Rogue Traders, Amy Meredith

=== 2011 ===
The Wiggles, Little Red, Ross Wilson, The McClymonts, Jessica Mauboy, Stan Walker, Altiyan Childs, Thirsty Merc, Justice Crew, Ganggajang, Jimmy Barnes

=== 2012 ===
INXS, Sneaky Sound System, Katie Noonan and the Captains, Spiderbait, Potbelleez

=== 2013 ===
Jimmy Barnes, The Presets, Guy Sebastian, Timomatic

=== 2014 ===
Lior, Matt Corby, Megan Washington, DJ Havana Brown

=== 2015 ===
Paul Kelly, Jessica Mauboy, Hi-5, Sheppard, Drawing North

=== 2016 ===
Jimmy Barnes, Samantha Jade, Nathaniel, Cyrus Villanueva

=== 2017 ===
The Wiggles, Human Nature, Tina Arena, Guy Sebastian, Dami Im, James Morrison

=== 2018 ===
Hosted by Grant Denyer, Sandra Sully and Luke Carroll, the musical talent featured was Anthony Callea, Marcia Hines, Christine Anu, Guy Sebastian, John Paul Young, Casey Donovan, Dami Im and Lorenzo Rositano.

There was no shortage of Australian music talent, with gracing the stage.

=== 2019 ===
Hosted by Jeremy Fernandez, Kate Ceberano, John Foreman and Luke Carroll, the concert featured Jon Stevens, Yothu Yindi & The Treaty Project, Anthony Callea, Ricki Lee and the Sydney Symphony Orchestra.

=== 2020 ===
Hosted by Jeremy Fernandez, John Foreman, Christine Anu and Vanessa Amorosi, the concert featured John Williamson, The Seekers, Isaiah Firebrace, Eskimo Joe, Diana Rouvas, Daniel Belle, KARI, William Barton, Sydney Symphony Orchestra.

== See also ==
- List of Australian music festivals
