= Paul Brandoli =

- Birth name: Paul Brandoli
- Born: Melbourne, Australia
- Origin: Sydney, Australia
- Labels: 120 Publishing

Paul Brandoli is an Australian songwriter from Sydney. He has top-lined and vocally produced 7 ARIA #1 Club hits, co-written and vocally produced 4 ARIA top 40 singles, and a national Spanish #1 single.

Brandoli has collaborated with artists such as Zeds Dead, Timmy Trumpet, Set Mo, Woodes, Moti, Colour Castle and Kill The Buzz. He has also worked with labels including Defected UK, TMRW, Vicious Recordings, Central Station, Sony Music (AUS), One Love, Spinnin Deep (Netherlands), Armada (Netherlands) and Deadbeats (Canada). He was a co-writer on the Set Mo song "I Belong Here" featuring Woodes, which was certified Gold in Australia.

Brandoli was previously in the bands Tune in Tokyo (band) and Culture Shock. He was a nominee finalist to join the Aprca Amcos board.

== Discography ==
=== Composer ===
- Holland Park, Liam Allan – "Crime"
- Moti (DJ) – "Lion (In My Head)"
- Timmy Trumpet, Qulinez – "Satellites"
- Josh Butler, Boswell – "Be Somebody"
- Luke Bond, Duna Lua – "Habitat"
- Nicky Romero, Timmy Trumpet – "Falling"
- Set Mo, Woodes – "I Belong Here"
- Zeds Dead, NGHTMRE, GG Magree – "Frontlines"
- GG Magree – "Bodies"
- Latroit, Stooki Sound, Lliam Taylor – "Echoes"
- Kronic – "Fire in the Sky"
- Two Can – "Got Habits"
- SLVR – "Lockdown"
- GG Magree – "One by One"
- Tune In Tokyo – "Ray of Love"
- Soraya – "Dreamer"
- Zeds Dead – "Northern Lights"
- Kate Ceberano – "Love Is Alive"
- Culture Shock – "My Enemy"(The Original Mix)
- Culture Shock – "Satisfy The Groove"(Original Mix)
- Jackson Mendoza – "Venus Or Mars"
- Husky Feat. Braze – "Only One Way"
- Kill The Buzz Feat. Katt Niall – "Galaxies"
- Courtney Act – "To Russia With Love"
- Lo'99 Feat. Doolie – "Stay High"
- Homeless John – "Disappear"
- Glover – "Hold On"
- Glover – "Faces"
- Colour Castle – "Love Addict"
- Reece Low, Joel Fletcher – "City Lights"
- Chardy – "Tomorrow"
- Rob & Jack – "Shadows"
- Who Killed Mickey – "Throne"
