= John Foreman (musician) =

Australian musician (born 1972)

John Foreman AM
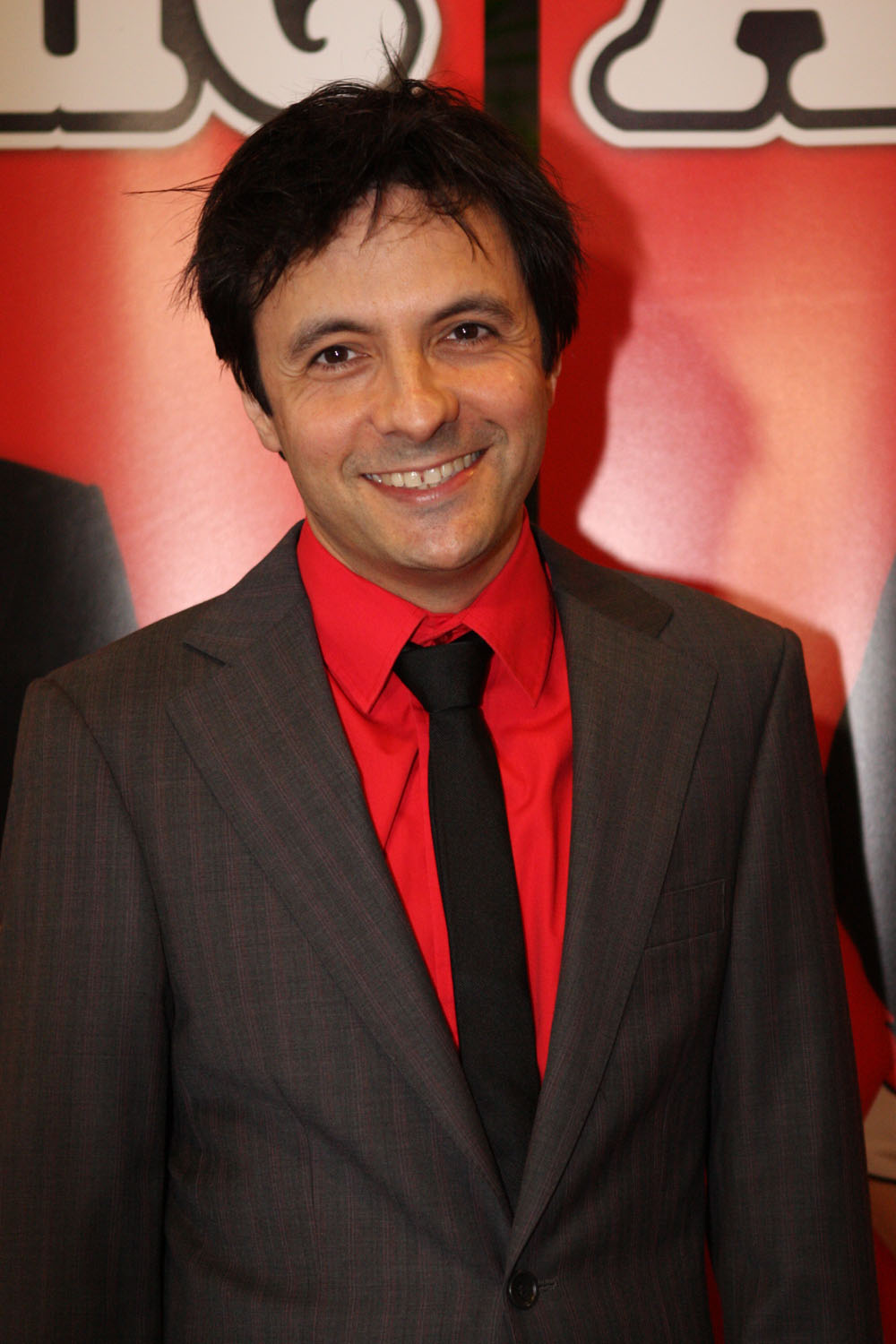
- Photographed in January 2012

Background information
- Born: John Gregory Foreman; 24 April 1972 (age 54); Newcastle, New South Wales, Australia
- Occupations: Musician, television personality
- Years active: 1992–present
- Website: johnforeman.com.au

John Gregory Foreman AM (born 24 April 1972) is an Australian musician and television personality. From 1992 to 2004, he was the music director for Network Ten's Good Morning Australia with Bert Newton. From 2003 until 2008 he was musical director of Australian Idol. He is the chair of the National Australia Day Council.

== Early life ==
Foreman was born in Newcastle, New South Wales and began learning piano at the age of six. He studied at Kotara High School in Newcastle, where he joined ska band, Eskargo, before joining Newcastle rock group, Train of Thought, which also featured former ABC News correspondent Scott Bevan . He later moved to the Conservatorium High School and the Sydney Conservatorium of Music.

== Career ==
=== Compositions and albums ===
Foreman released the album No Jivin' in 1993 on the BMG label which received an ARIA Award nomination for Best Jazz Album.

In 2000, Foreman wrote the Olympic flame song, "The Flame", performed by Tina Arena for the 2000 Summer Olympics opening ceremony.

Foreman wrote "Melbourne Girl" for the closing ceremony of the 2002 Commonwealth Games in Manchester, UK, which was performed by Vanessa Amorosi.

In 2004, he produced, orchestrated and conducted Anthony Callea's recording of The Prayer, which received an ARIA Award for the highest selling single by an Australia artist.

He wrote "Light the Way" for the 2006 opening ceremony of the Asian Games in Doha, performed by José Carreras and Majida El Roumi.

Foreman produced albums and/or singles for Marcia Hines, Silvie Paladino, Guy Sebastian, Ricki-Lee Coulter, Carl Riseley and Greta Bradman.

In 2013, he produced Anthony Callea's Christmas album This Is Christmas.

In 2017, Foreman produced Callea's ARIA Number 1 Hits in Symphony, which featured the Melbourne Symphony Orchestra.

He produced the single "Proud" for Casey Donovan, released in January 2020.

Foreman wrote the background music for Chris Lilley's television shows, Ja'mie: Private School Girl and Jonah from Tonga.

=== Other television work ===
In December 2005 Foreman began hosting The Big Night In with John Foreman. The premiere episode featured an interview with actor Russell Crowe, as well as interviews with vocalists Deborah Conway and Tina Cousins.

Foreman became the musical director for Melbourne's Christmas Eve Carols by Candlelight at the Sidney Myer Music Bowl in 2003. He is musical director for the Logie Awards. In 2008 he appeared alongside Ian Dickson, Cosima De Vito and Guy Sebastian to pay tribute to Shannon Noll on This Is Your Life.

In February 2012 he joined the reboot of Young Talent Time as the musical director.

Foreman was musical director for Oprah Winfrey's telecast from the steps of the Sydney Opera House, which featured Hugh Jackman, Nicole Kidman, Olivia Newton-John, Russell Crowe and Keith Urban performing a one-time-only rendition of I Still Call Australia Home with Foreman and his orchestra.

Foreman hosts the annual Schools Spectacular which airs on the Seven Network (previously on Nine). Foreman performed as a soloist at the Schools Spectacular when he was a high school student.

Since 2019 Foreman was host of the Australia Day Live Concert from the Sydney Opera House on ABC TV.

=== Live performance ===
Foreman conducted the Australian Philharmonic Orchestra for their Not New Year's Eve Concert at the Sydney Opera House and their New Year's Eve Concert at Hamer Hall in Melbourne in 2012 until 2017.

In 2019 he took over management of the Australian Pops Orchestra and conducted the orchestra's 2019 New Year's Eve Gala Concert, which featured Harrison Craig, Marina Prior, Silvie Paladino and Denis Walter.

He performed as a jazz artist at the Montreal International Jazz Festival in 1995 and the Santa Barbara International Jazz Festival in 1998 and 1999.

Foreman has been musical director for theatre shows for The Production Company, including The Boy from Oz, Dirty Rotten Scoundrels, Hello, Dolly! and Anything Goes.

=== Creative director and television producer ===
Foreman became creative director for Australia Day in Sydney in 2015. An evening concert on the steps of the Sydney Opera House on Australia Day 2015 featured Jessica Mauboy, Guy Sebastian, Sheppard, The Veronicas, Russell Morris and James Morrison.

He was creative director for the opening ceremony of the 2013 Asia Pacific Special Olympics Opening Ceremony in Newcastle, which featured Human Nature, Marcia Hines, Doug Parkinson, The McClymonts and local Newcastle performers.

Together with manager Richard Macionis, Foreman was executive producer of the Network Ten special, John Foreman Presents Burt Bacharach in 2007.

== Awards and recognition ==
Foreman was awarded the Medal of the Order of Australia in the 2015 Queen's Birthday Honours for "service to the performing arts, particularly as a musical event director and musician". He was promoted to Member of the Order of Australia in the 2024 Australia Day Honours for "significant service to the performing arts, particularly music, and to the community".

He is the current chair of the National Australia Day Council.

== Other roles ==
- Ambassador, Music: Count Us In
- Ambassador, Special Olympics Australia
- Board member, Talent Development Project (TDP)

== Discography ==
Year	Title	Artist	Label	Unit	Role
1992	No Jivin'	John Foreman	BMG	Album	Artist / Composer
2000	The Flame	Tina Arena	Sony / BMG	Single	Composer
2003	Climb Every Mountain	Guy Sebastian	BMG	Single (B-side)	Producer
2004	The Prayer	Anthony Callea	BMG	Single	Producer
2004	Hinesight	Marcia Hines	BMG	Album	Producer
2005	Bridge Over Trouble Water	Anthony Callea	BMG	Single (B-side)	Producer
2005	Don't Tell Me	Anthony Callea	BMG	Album track	Co-writer / Co-producer
2008	The Rise	Carl Riseley	Universal	Album	Producer
2010	Forest of Dreams	Greta Bradman	Sony	Album	Producer
2012	On My Own	Silvie Paladino	ABC Music	Album	Producer
2013	This Is Christmas	Anthony Callea	ABC Music	Album	Producer
2017	ARIA Number 1 Hits in Symphony	Anthony Callea & Melbourne Symphony Orchestra	Sony	Album	Producer
2018	Josh Piterman	Josh Piterman	Fanfare (Sony)	Album	Producer
2020	Proud	Casey Donovan	MGM	Single	Producer

== Bibliography ==
- Foreman, John (2005). Your Guide to Unlocking the Australian Music Industry : A Definitive Guide to Getting Started and Succeeding in One of Australia's Toughest Industries. South Oakleigh, Victoria: Funtastic. ISBN 978-1-74167-016-5. NLA 3421337.
