= Ha Ha Ha (album) =

Studio album by Natalie Gauci
- Released: 1 July 2012
- Genres: Jazz, soul
- Label: The Gaunch

Natalie Gauci chronology
| I'm Ready (2010) | Ha Ha Ha (2012) | Elektrik Field (2012) |

Ha Ha Ha is the second studio album by Australian singer-songwriter Natalie Gauci. The album's jazz-oriented sound is a significant departure from Gauci's earlier pop roots. In early 2013, the album was removed from the iTunes Store for reasons unclear.

== Track listing ==
| No. | Title | Length |
|---|---|---|
| 1. | "Only the Lonely" | 3:42 |
| 2. | "Running Away" | 3:18 |
| 3. | "Free Falling" | 3:40 |
| 4. | "Ain't Gonna Change" | 3:22 |
| 5. | "Grow Up" | 3:44 |
| 6. | "Save Tomorrow" | 2:25 |
| 7. | "Ha Ha Ha" | 2:48 |
| 8. | "U" | 3:53 |
| 9. | "Give You Up" | 3:13 |
| 10. | "Sex" | 2:11 |
| 11. | "Rush" | 3:27 |
| Total length: | | 35:43 |
