= The Winner's Journey (Natalie Gauci album) =

Studio album by Natalie Gauci
- Released: 8 December 2007
- Recorded: Sony BMG Studios, Sydney 2007
- Genre: Pop
- Label: Sony BMG Australia
- Producers: Ross Fraser (executive producer), John Foreman

Natalie Gauci chronology
Take It or Leave It (2006)	The Winner's Journey (2007)	I'm Ready (2010)

Singles from The Winner's Journey
- 1. "Here I Am" Released: 26 November 2007

The Winner's Journey is the debut studio album by Australian Idol 2007 winner Natalie Gauci. As opposed to the previous format of releasing the winner's album consisting of recordings of the winner's live performance on the show, the album is composed of full studio-recorded versions of songs performed by Gauci on the show, including her debut single "Here I Am".

The album also includes a bonus DVD which features an "exciting in-depth interview" with John Foreman (producer) and Ross Fraser (Sony BMG A&R); as she tells her story of her journey to Idol fame and demonstrates her unique song arrangements on piano.

== Critical reception ==
Professional ratings
Review scores
Source	Rating
AllMusic	3.5/5 stars

Matthew Chisling from AllMusic gave The Winner's Journey a generally positive review, saying "What makes the album work is that the tunes included are a mixed bag of pop hits, jazz tunes, and rock ballads that Gauci effortlessly sings through. However, she manages to put her own stamp on many great tracks by incorporating her skills as a piano genius, putting dark spins on crowd favorites (such as "Apologize" and "Umbrella")." He also called it "a strong base for Gauci's next effort".

== Track listing ==
CD
No.	Title	Length
1.	"Here I Am"	3:46
2.	"Man In the Mirror"	3:50
3.	"Umbrella"	3:34
4.	"Apologize"	2:26
5.	"Boys in Town"	2:30
6.	"Crazy"	3:42
7.	"Running Up That Hill"	2:29
8.	"Orange Colored Sky"	2:25
9.	"How High the Moon"	2:50
10.	"Nobody Knows"	3:22
11.	"(Baby I've Got You) On My Mind"	3:14
12.	"Nothing Compares 2 U"	3:10
13.	"Feeling Good"	3:46

DVD
No.	Title	Length
1.	"Interview between Natalie Gauci, John Foreman & Ross Fraser"

== Charts and certifications ==
=== Charts ===
Chart (2007)	Peak position
Australia (ARIA)	11

=== Certifications ===
Territory	Certification	Sales
Australia (ARIA)	Platinum	70,000
