= Australian Citizenship Day =

Australian holiday on 17 September

- Observed by: Australia
- Date: 17 September
- Next time: 17 September 2025
- Frequency: Annually
- First time: 17 September 2001; 23 years ago

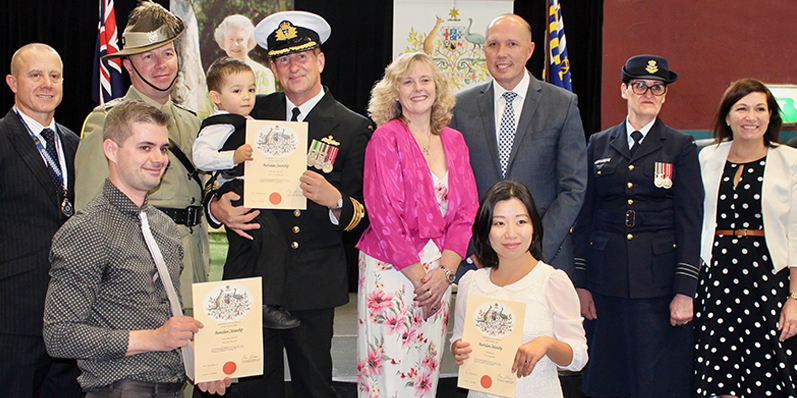
Citizenship ceremony on Australian Citizenship Day in Calamvale, Queensland in 2017

Australian Citizenship Day is celebrated each year on 17 September. Managed by the Australian Department of Home Affairs, Australian Citizenship Day is an opportunity for all Australian citizens, whether by birth or by choice, to reflect on the meaning and importance of their citizenship. The day is used as an opportunity to think about what unites all Australians, to take pride in Australia's democratic values and to celebrate the role citizens play in shaping the nation.

== History ==
The Australian Government introduced Australian Citizenship Day in 2001 in response to a recommendation by the Australian Citizenship Council (established in 1998) in their 2000 report Australian Citizenship for a New Century. The recommendation came from a proposal of the 1999 National Schools Constitutional Convention that a citizenship day be established to allow all Australians to celebrate their Australian citizenship. The Australian Citizenship Council noted that an annual citizenship day would increase community awareness of Australian citizenship while providing a focal point for citizenship-related activities and celebrations.

The 17th of September was chosen as Australian Citizenship Day as it is the anniversary of the renaming, in 1973, of the Nationality and Citizenship Act 1948 to the Australian Citizenship Act 1948

The first Australian Citizenship Day was celebrated in 2001, coinciding with the Centenary of Federation.

== Celebrating Australian Citizenship Day ==
Since 2001, the DIBP has promoted Australian Citizenship Day by holding special citizenship ceremonies, affirmation ceremonies and other events around the country highlighting the day. Local government councils are encouraged to hold special citizenship ceremonies and affirmation ceremonies on or around this day. Across Australia, thousands of people become Australian citizens each year at special Australian Citizenship Day ceremonies.

Schools, organisations and community groups are also encouraged to organise special events and activities. Many schools in Australia build on the theory learnt by students in their civics and citizenship education by holding celebrations on Australian Citizenship Day. For example, by holding a school assembly where students speak about what it means to them to be Australian, hosting an Australian citizenship affirmation ceremony or partnering with local councils to attend, or host, an Australian citizenship ceremony.
