= The Stillest Hour =

Studio album by Carl Riseley
- Released: 24 April 2009
- Recorded: 2009
- Studios: Electric Avenue & Trackdown Scoring Stage, Sydney, Australia
- Genre: Jazz
- Length: 44:25
- Label: Universal Music Australia

Carl Riseley chronology
The Rise (2008)	The Stillest Hour (2009)

Singles from The Stillest Hour
- 1. "The Stillest Hour" Released: 10 April 2009

The Stillest Hour is the second studio album by former Australian Idol star Carl Riseley. It was released on 24 April 2009 in Australia.

== Track listing ==
1. "Tenderly" (Walter Gross, Jack Lawrence)- 5:10
2. "The Stillest Hour" (Ford Turrell) – 3:54
3. "When I Fall in Love" (Edward Heyman, Victor Young) – 4:53
4. "Come Away with Me" (Norah Jones) – 3:24
5. "Never Give Up" (Ron Sexsmith) – 3:37
6. "My Funny Valentine" (Lorenz Hart, Richard Rodgers)- 4:48
7. "Arms of a Woman" (Amos Lee, Ryan Massaro) – 4:43
8. "The Way You Are Tonight" (Don Walker) – 4:28
9. "Don't Let Me Be Lonely Tonight" (James Taylor) – 4:11
10. "Magnolia" (John Cale) – 3:30
11. "Reprise (The Stillest Hour)" – 1:39

== Charts ==
Chart (2009)	Peak position
Australian Albums (ARIA)	21

== Sources ==
- GetMusic.com.au – Carl Riseley
- News.com.au/AdelaideNow: Article by NATHAN DAVIES (23 May 2009)
