= Tune in Tokyo =

- Origin: Australia
- Genres: Pop, dance-pop, electropop, synthpop
- Years active: 2010–present
- Label: Onelove
- Members: Natalie Gauci; Paul Brandoli

Tune in Tokyo is an Australia dance duo formed in 2010 by Australian Idol winner Natalie Gauci and producer Paul Brandoli. They are currently signed to Onelove Records, a dance sub-label of Sony BMG. Their debut single "Dreamer" did not appear on the ARIA Top 100, but reached #3 on the ARIA Club Charts.

== Background ==
In 2010 Gauci formed Tune in Tokyo, an electro-pop and dance music band, with producer Paul Brandoli. As the group's lead singer, Gauci's look and sound had changed. She told the Daily Telegraph that she developed her new look and sound after hanging out in Melbourne's gay dance clubs with musician, and her then-husband, Hamish Cowan (Cordrazine). Gauci explained, "That's where I came out of my shell. I didn't have anyone telling me what to do. Tune in Tokyo is just one part of what I want to do. We got a lot of feedback straight away, which was great because it gave me confidence about the project". They released their debut single "Dreamer" in November 2010, followed by "Ray of Love" in April 2012.

== Discography ==
=== Singles ===
List of singles, with chart positions
Title	Year	Peak chart positions
Title	Year	AUS Club
"Dreamer"	2010	3
"Ray of Love"	2012	8
"—" denotes releases that did not chart.
