= Culture Shock (group) =

Australian group

- Origin: Sydney, Australia
- Years active: 1993–1995
- Labels: Dance Pool; Columbia
- Past members: Lorena Novoa; Paul Brandoli; Victoria Wu

Culture Shock were a short-lived Australian dance trio consisting of Lorena Novoa, Paul Brandoli and Victoria Wu. Culture Shock released one studio album, released in 1993 on the Footprintz Productionz label. The album was re-released in September 1994 on Dance Pool/Columbia following the success of "Satisfy the Groove".

== Discography ==
=== Albums ===
List of albums, with selected details and chart positions
Title	Album details	Peak chart positions
Title	Album details	AUS
Culture Shock	Released: 1993; Label: Footprintz Productionz (FPA001) Dance Pool, Columbia (477336 2); Format: CD, cassette	33

=== Singles ===
List of singles, with selected chart positions
Title	Year	Peak chart positions	Album
Title	Year	AUS	Album
"Satisfy the Groove"	1994	31	Culture Shock
"My Enemy"	1994	40	Culture Shock
"Amor Serenade"	1994	117	Culture Shock
"Who's Gonna Cry for You"	1995	125	Non-album single
