= Woodes =

Australian singer-songwriter and producer

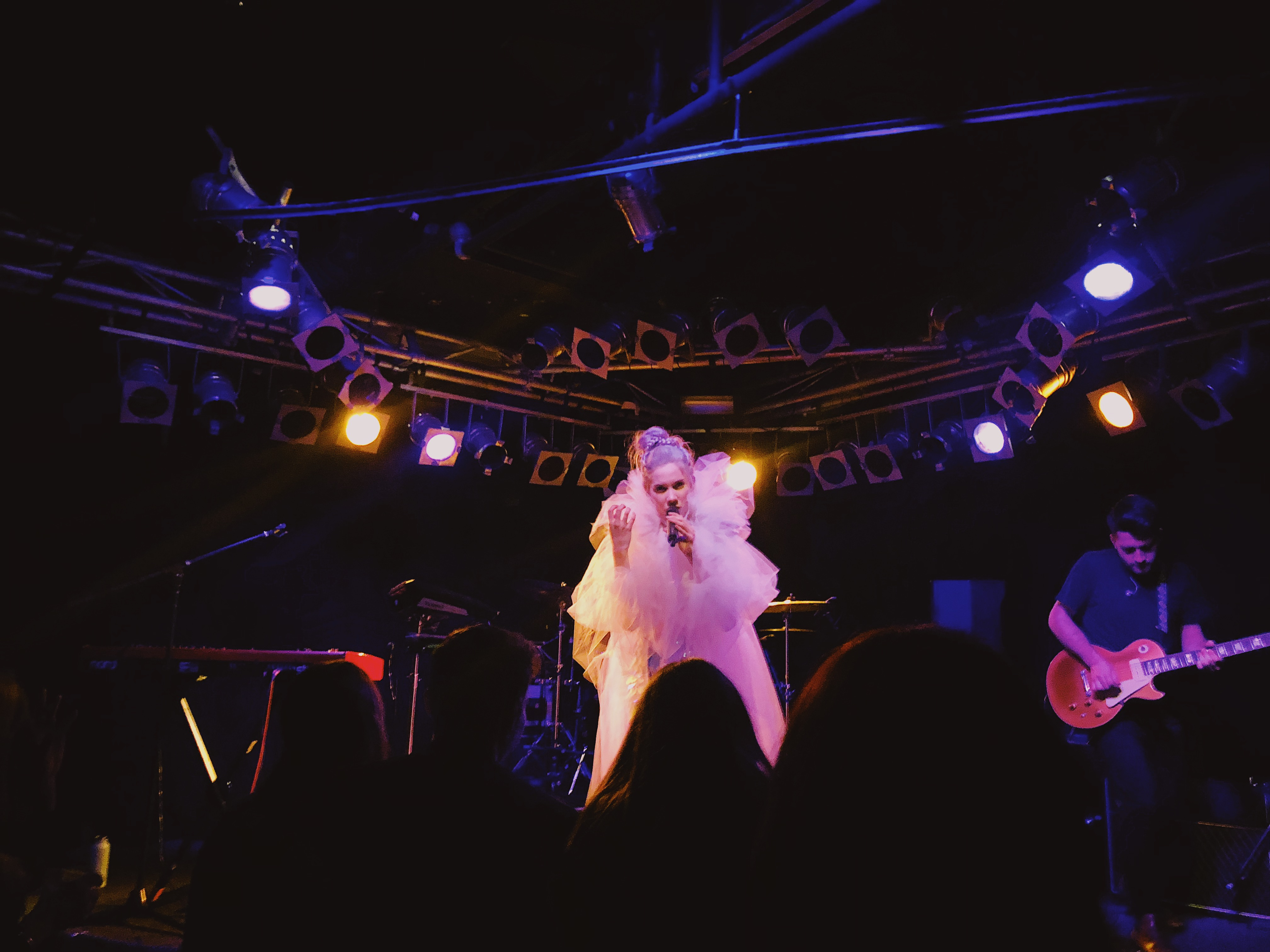
- Woodes performing in Perth

Background information
- Born: Elle Graham; 17 May 1992 (age 34)
- Origin: Melbourne, Australia
- Genres: Alternative, Indie
- Instruments: Vocals; Piano
- Website: woodesmusic.com

Elle Graham, also known as Woodes, is an Australian musician, singer-songwriter and producer from Melbourne, Australia. Her debut album "Crystal Ball" was released in 2020. Woodes has supported Client Liaison on their 2019 "The Real Thing" tour. Elle received full rotation on radio for singles including: "Run For It", "The Thaw", "Origami", Set Mo's "I Belong Here", and "Change My Mind". Woodes covered a Vance Joy song for her triple j Like a Version. In 2021, she launched Tornado Club, a collaborative duo with The Kite String Tangle.

Woodes released her EP, Kingdom Come, on 9 June 2023. The record explores themes of self-healing, personal growth, and the complexities of relationships. Collaborating with The Kite String Tangle, Woodes stated Kingdom Come was her most personal music, "it was all about me finding power within myself after a breakup and moving interstate."

== Touring ==
In 2018 Woodes supported Sylvan Esso on their "What Now" tour. She also supported Børns on their Australian tours.

== Discography ==
=== Albums ===
List of albums, with selected details
Title	Details
Crystal Ball	Released: 2020; Label: Woodes Music; Format: CD, LP, digital
The Great Unknown	Released: December 2023; Label: Nettwerk Music Group Inc.; Format: digital

=== EPs ===
List of EPs, with selected details
Title	Details
Woodes x Elkkle (with Elkkle)	Released: 2015; Label: Woodes x Elkkle; Format: digital
Woodes	Released: October 2016; Label: Woodes Music; Format: CD, digital
Woodes	Released: October 2016; Label: Woodes Music; Format: CD, digital

== Awards and nominations ==
=== Environmental Music Prize ===
The Environmental Music Prize is a quest to find a theme song to inspire action on climate and conservation. It commenced in 2022.

Year	Nominee / work	Award	Result	Ref.
2023	"Forever After"	Environmental Music Prize	Nominated	
2025	"Lifetime"	Environmental Music Prize	Nominated	
