= GG Magree =

Australian music producer, DJ, and singer (born 1989)

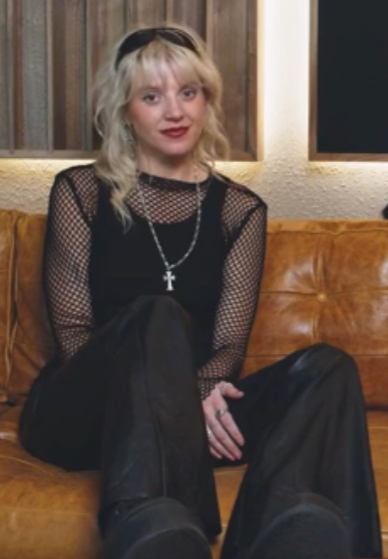
- In a 2022 interview

Background information
- Born: Georgia Magree; 25 January 1989 (age 37); Sydney, New South Wales, Australia
- Genres: EDM; Trap; pop-punk
- Instruments: Vocals; DJ; Music Producer
- Years active: 2012–present
- Labels: Deadbeats, Monstercat
- Website: ggmagree.com

Georgia Magree (born 25 January 1989), known professionally as GG Magree, is an Australian electronic music producer, DJ, and singer. Magree is originally from Sydney, and now resides in Los Angeles, California.

== Touring ==
Magree has performed at many festivals and events around the world including: Coachella, Ultra Music Festival, and Lollapalooza.

While touring in early 2020, Magree contracted COVID-19.

== Discography ==
=== Extended plays ===
- Dichotomy (2022)

=== Singles ===
- "One By One" (2017)
- "Bodies" (2018)
- "I Wanna Lose You" (2019)
- "Save My Grave" (with Zeds Dead and DNMO) (2020)
- "You Don't Know Me" (2020)
- "Flatline" (with Sullivan King and Kai Wachi) (2020)
- "Nervous Habits" (featuring Joey Fleming) (2020)
- "Loving You Kills Me" (2021)
- "Tear You Apart" (with Aaron Gillespie) (2021)
- "My Wicked" (2022)
- "Déjà Rêvé" ("Deja Reve") (2022)
- Already Dead (2022)

=== Features ===
- Zeds Dead, Nghtmre – "Frontlines" (2016)
- Jauz – "Ghost" (2017)
- LAXX – "Heart (2018)
- Borgore, Axel Boy – "Reasons" (2018)
- Blanke – "Incinerate" (2019)
- Seven Lions - "Falling Fast" (2022)
- Seven Lions - "Miss You" (2022)

=== Remixes ===
- Big Wild – "Heaven" (GG Magree Remix) (2019)
- GG Magree – "You Don't Know Me" (VIP Mix) (2020)

== Filmography ==
Year	Title	Role	Notes
2021	The Boulet Brothers' Dragula	Herself	Guest Judge: Season 4, Episode 2
2023	Dead Hot: Season of the Witch	Herself	Documentary
