= National Australia Day Council =

Australian of the Year awards organisation

- Abbreviation: NADC
- Predecessor: National Australia Day Committee
- Formation: 25 October 1990 (incorporated)
- Type: Social enterprise
- Headquarters: Old Parliament House, Canberra
- Location: Canberra, Australian Capital Territory
- Region served: Australia
- Services: Australian of the Year awards; Australia Day celebrations
- Owner: Australian Government
- Chair: Melissa Doyle
- CEO: Carrie-Ann Leeson
- Parent organisation: Department of the Prime Minister and Cabinet
- Affiliations: Australia Day National Network
- Expenses: A$18,363,174 (2025)
- Staff: 13 (2025)
- Website: australiaday.org.au/about/nadc/

The National Australia Day Council (NADC) is a non-profit social enterprise owned by the Australian Government. It is the national coordinating body for the Australian of the Year awards and Australia Day. The National Australia Day Council was established in 1979 and incorporated as a government-owned business in 1990.

== History ==
The Australian Natives' Association was one of the chief promoters of Australia Day as a national holiday, and in 1946 formed an Australia Day Celebrations Committee in Melbourne to formalise its efforts. The first celebration on 26 January 1948, a luncheon, was held by the Australia Day Council (Victoria) at the Melbourne Town Hall. Over the following five years, other states formed various Australia Day councils, committees, and associations. The Victorian body selected its first Australian of the Year in 1960.

The Federal Australia Day Council (FADC) was formed to coordinate the state bodies' efforts. In 1979, with the FADC's agreement, the organisation was replaced by a government-sponsored National Australia Day Committee. The committee was initially headed by former Olympian Herb Elliott.

In 1985, it was renamed the National Australia Day Council, with former tennis player John Newcombe as president.

The organisation became an incorporated public company in 1990.

== Description and activities ==
The National Australia Day Council (NADC) heads a network of state and territory Australia Day affiliate organisations and local Australia Day committees. It assists celebrations of Australia Day and of "being Australian", as well as recognising outstanding Australians through its awards. It serves as the national coordinating body for the Australian of the Year awards and Australia Day celebrations. In 2025, the NADC supported major events in capital cities, as well as more than 700 community events across Australia.

According to its 2024-2025 Annual Report, NADC's mission is "to unite all Australians through celebration and reflection." Its focus areas, as stated on the NADC website in 2026, are:

- "Participation: To unite all Australians through celebration and reflection"
- "Meaning: To promote the meaning of Australia Day and being Australian "
- "Recognition: To acknowledge active citizenship and achievement"

The NADC is housed at Old Parliament House, Canberra.

== Governance ==
The NADC is a non-profit social enterprise owned by the Australian Government, accountable to the Department of the Prime Minister and Cabinet. The company's operations are governed by a board of directors appointed by the Prime Minister of Australia.

As of November 2026, the chair of the NADC is Melissa Doyle, while Carrie-Ann Leeson is CEO. there are 13 members of staff. In the 2024-2025 financial year, A$15,873,974 in funding was provided by the government, while sponsors provided a total of A$1,885,581. Expenses totalled A$18,363,174.

== State and territory affiliations ==
The Australia Day National Network is an affiliate group of state and territory organisations.

- The Australia Day Council Victoria was the first such body, formed in 1948.
- The Australia Day Council of NSW was established by the New South Wales Government in 1981. As of 2026 the chair is City of Sydney councillor Yvonne Weldon.
- The Australia Day Council of South Australia's website is hosted by the NADC.
- The Australia Day Council of Western Australia is called Auspire.

== Awards ==
The NADC is responsible for running the Australian of the Year awards, the culmination of a number of award processes undertaken by selection panels in each state and territory of Australia. As well as Australian of the Year, three other categories are selected: Senior Australian of the Year; Young Australian of the Year; and Local Hero.

== Chairs since 1990 ==
Chairs of the National Australia Day Council
Chair name	Term
John Newcombe	1990–1992
Phillip Adams	1992–1996
Kevan Gosper	1996–2000
Lisa Curry-Kenny	2000–2008
Adam Gilchrist	2008–2014
Ben Roberts-Smith	2014–2017
Danielle Roche	2017–2023
John Foreman	2023–2026
Melissa Doyle	2026-present
