= The Rise (Carl Riseley album) =

Studio album by Carl Riseley
- Released: April 2008
- Recorded: 2008
- Studios: Allan Eaton Studios, Melbourne, Electric Avenue Studios, Sydney, Australia
- Genres: Pop; Jazz; Easy listening
- Length: 47:02
- Label: Mercury Australia
- Producer: John Foreman

Carl Riseley chronology
The Rise (2008)	The Stillest Hour (2009)

The Rise is a 2008 album by Australian singer Carl Riseley. It was released on 26 April, and produced by John Foreman, the music director of Australian Idol, after Carl Riseley came third in the 2007 series of the show. The record features a guest appearance by James Morrison, who arranged "Waltzing Matilda".

== Track listing ==
1. "Let's Fall in Love" (Harold Arlen, Ted Koehler)- 2:53
2. "Pure Imagination" (Leslie Bricusse, Anthony Newley) - 3:51
3. "Lido Shuffle" (David Paich, Boz Scaggs) - 4:12
4. "Does Anybody Really Know What Time It Is?" (Robert Lamm) - 3:33
5. "We've Only Just Begun" (Paul Williams, Roger Nichols) - 3:42
6. "Reminiscing" (Graham Goble)- 4:03
7. "The Girl from Ipanema" (Norman Gimbel, Antônio Carlos Jobim, Vinícius de Moraes) - 3:15
8. "This Guy's in Love with You" (Burt Bacharach, Hal David) - 4:28
9. "The Letter" (Wayne Carson) - 3:14
10. "Time After Time" (Sammy Cahn, Jule Styne)- 3:16
11. "Smooth Operator" (Sade Adu, Ray St. John) - 3:40
12. "Waltzing Matilda" (Marie Cowan) - 6:29
13. "That's All" (Bob Haymes, Alan Brandt) - 2:18 (iTunes Bonus Track)

== Charts ==
Chart (2008)	Peak position
Australian Albums (ARIA)	5
