= Set Mo =

Australian electronic music duo

- Origin: Sydney, New South Wales, Australia
- Genres: House, Deep House, Tech House
- Years active: 2012–present
- Labels: etcetc (2014–2017)
- Members: Nicholas Drabble; Stuart Turner
- Website: www.setmomusic.com

Set Mo are an Australian electronic music duo made up of disc jockeys and music producers Nick Drabble and Stu Turner. The duo are from Sydney.

== Background ==
Drabble and Turner began to form an interest in EDM at the age of 18. They met at several parties and started a joint project. The pair gained widespread recognition through their song White Dress, which was released in collaboration with Warner Music and placed 42nd on the Australian Club Charts of 2015. Their song "Unity" peaked at #6 in industry magazine Resident Advisor's chart in April 2018. The duo have appeared at many festivals nationwide including: Field Day, Falls Festival, Splendour in the Grass and Beyond The Valley, among others. Most of their songs were produced in Australia, London, Amsterdam and Berlin.

The duo released their second studio album Flux in April 2023.

== Discography ==
=== Albums ===
List of albums released, with release date and label details shown
Title	Album details
Surrender	Released: 1 February 2019; Label: Set Mo Records; Formats: CD, digital download, streaming
Flux	Released: 21 April 2023; Label: High Vibrations, AWAL; Formats: CD, 2×LP, digital download, streaming

=== EPs ===
List of EPs released, with release date and label details shown
Title	Details
The Crush	Released: 1 January 2014; Label: Etcetc Music; Formats: Digital download, streaming
After Dark, Vol 1	Released: 5 April 2017; Label: Etcetc Music, Universal Australia; Formats: Digital download, streaming

=== Certified singles ===
List of certified singles as lead artist, with year released, album details
Title	Year	Certifications	Album
"White Dress" (featuring Deutsche Duke)	2015	ARIA: Gold	Non-album singles
"See Right Through Me"	2016	ARIA: Platinum	Non-album singles
"I Belong Here" (featuring Woodes)	2017	ARIA: Platinum	Non-album singles
