= Australia Day =

Australian national holiday

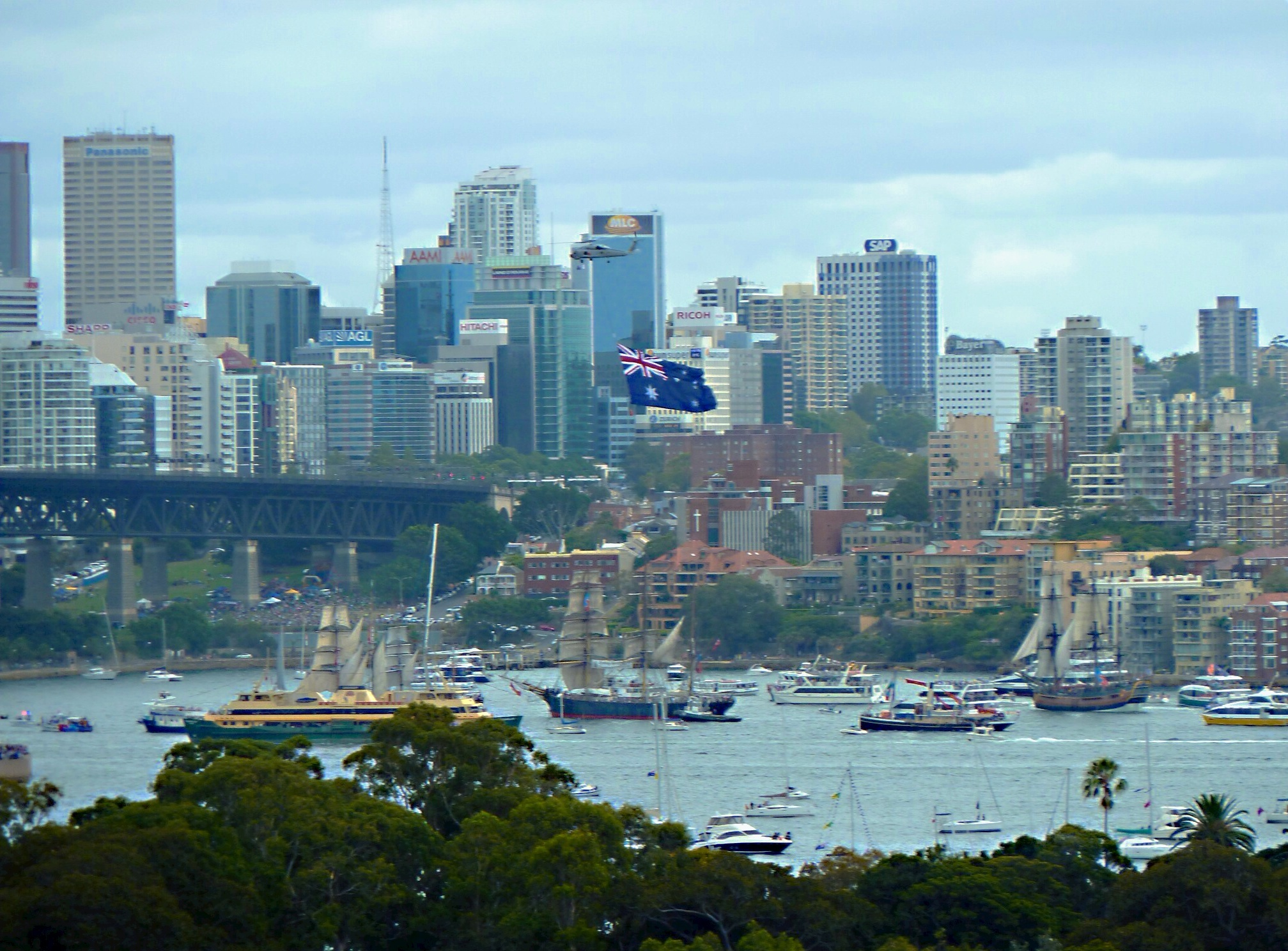
- Sydney Harbour on Australia Day, 2014
- Also called: Anniversary Day; Foundation Day; Survival Day; Invasion Day
- Observed by: Australian citizens, residents and expatriates
- Type: National
- Significance: Anniversary of the landing of the First Fleet in Sydney Cove in 1788
- Observances: Family gatherings, fireworks, picnics and barbecues, parades, citizenship ceremonies, Australia Day honours, Australian of the Year presentation, many other celebrations alongside protests and mourning ceremonies
- Date: 26 January
- Next time: 26 January 2027
- Frequency: Annual

Australia Day is the official national day of Australia. Observed annually on 26 January, it marks the 1788 landing of the First Fleet and raising of the Union Flag of Great Britain by Arthur Phillip at Sydney Cove, a small bay on the southern shore of Sydney Harbour. The day is promoted by the Australia Day Council, an independent government owned company. Events are run to recognise the contributions of Australians to the nation, while also encouraging reflection on the country's history and reconciliation with Indigenous Australians, and respecting the diversity and achievements of Australian society. The presentation of community awards and citizenship ceremonies are also commonly held on the day. The holiday is marked by the presentation of the Australian of the Year Awards on Australia Day Eve, announcement of the Australia Day Honours list and addresses from the governor-general and prime minister. It is an official public holiday in every state and territory. With community festivals, concerts and citizenship ceremonies, the day is celebrated in large and small communities and cities around the nation. Australia Day has become the biggest annual civic event in Australia.

The meaning and significance of Australia Day has evolved since the first records of celebration in 1808, with contested views on the day existing since at least 1888. Previously, the states celebrated different days that acknowledged their founding, such as Regatta Day in Tasmania, Queensland Day in Queensland or Foundation Day in Western Australia; the celebration of the first Anniversary Day or Foundation Day by New South Wales in 1818 was seen in a similar light. Following Federation in 1901, moves for a national holiday gained pace (prompted by lobbying by the Australian Natives' Association which celebrated ANA Day), with the name Australia Day and the date of 26 January finally selected in 1935, with a public holiday at or around that date in all states in 1940. The first prominent protest also occurred around this time in 1938, with the first Day of Mourning held by the Australian Aborigines' League. In 1994, the date was fixed in all jurisdictions on 26 January, with the practice by some states of holding the holiday on a Friday in late January for a long weekend dropped.

Since at least 1938, the date of Australia Day has also been a day of protest and of mourning the start of the British colonisation of Australia, characterised as an invasion in which Aboriginal Australians had the land that they had occupied for millennia forcibly taken. Some observe 26 January as Invasion Day, Survival Day or as a Day of Mourning, as a counter-observance to the national day. Some counter-observers and others have called for the date of Australia Day to be changed or the holiday to be abolished entirely. Support for changing the date has been a minority position over successive annual polls. A January 2026 Roy Morgan poll found 60.5% support for retaining 26 January as the date for Australia Day.

== History ==
=== Arrival of the First Fleet: 1788 ===
On 13 May 1787 a fleet of 11 ships, which came to be known as the First Fleet, was sent by the British Admiralty from England to New Holland. (Note: The name New Holland remained in popular and semi-official use until at least the mid-1850s.) Under the command of Naval Captain Arthur Phillip, the fleet sought to establish a penal colony at Botany Bay on the coast of New South Wales, which had been explored and claimed by Lieutenant James Cook in 1770. The settlement was seen as necessary because of the loss of the Thirteen Colonies in North America. The Fleet arrived between 18 and 20 January 1788, but it was immediately apparent that Botany Bay was unsuitable. They made contact with the local Aboriginal people, the Cadigal.

On 21 January, Phillip and a few officers travelled to Port Jackson, 12 kilometres (7.5 mi) to the north, to see if it would be a better location for a settlement. They stayed there until 23 January; Phillip named the site of their landing Sydney Cove, after the Home Secretary, Thomas Townshend, 1st Viscount Sydney.

On the morning of 24 January, the party was startled when two French ships, the Astrolabe and the Boussole, were seen just outside Botany Bay. This was a scientific expedition led by Jean-François de La Pérouse. The French had expected to find a thriving colony where they could repair ships and restock supplies, not a newly arrived fleet of convicts considerably more poorly provisioned than themselves.

On 25 January the gale was still blowing; the fleet tried to leave Botany Bay, but only HMS Supply made it out, carrying Arthur Phillip, Philip Gidley King, some marines and about 40 convicts; they anchored in Sydney Cove in the afternoon. Meanwhile, back at Botany Bay, Captain John Hunter of HMS Sirius made contact with the French ships, and he and the commander, Captain de Clonard, exchanged greetings. Clonard informed Hunter that the fleet commander was Jean-François de Galaup, comte de La Pérouse. Sirius successfully cleared Botany Bay, but the other ships were in great difficulty. Charlotte was blown dangerously close to rocks, Friendship and Prince of Wales became entangled, both ships losing booms or sails, Charlotte and Friendship collided, and Lady Penrhyn nearly ran aground. Despite these difficulties, all the remaining ships finally managed to clear Botany Bay and sail to Sydney Cove on 26 January. The last ship anchored there at about 3 pm.

Clearing of the ground for an encampment immediately began. Then, according to Phillip's account:

In the evening of the 26th the colours were displayed on shore, and the Governor, with several of his principal officers and others, assembled round the flag-staff, drank the king's health, and success to the settlement, with all that display of form which on such occasions is esteemed propitious, because it enlivens the spirits, and fills the imagination with pleasing presages.

— The Voyage of Governor Phillip to Botany Bay

The formal establishment of the Colony of New South Wales did not however occur on 26 January as is commonly assumed. It did not occur until 7 February 1788, when the formal proclamation of the colony and of Arthur Phillip's governorship were read out. The vesting of all land in the reigning monarch King George III also dates from 7 February 1788.

=== 1788–1838 ===
Although there was no official recognition of the colony's anniversary, with the New South Wales Almanacks of 1806 and 1808 placing no special significance on 26 January, by 1808 the date was being used by the colony's immigrants, especially the emancipated convicts, to "celebrate their love of the land they lived in" with "drinking and merriment". The 1808 celebrations followed this pattern, beginning at sunset on 25 January and lasting into the night, the chief toast of the occasion being Major George Johnston. Johnston had the honour of being the first officer ashore from the First Fleet, having been carried from the landing boat on the back of convict James Ruse. Despite suffering the ill-effects of a fall from his gig on the way home to Annandale, Johnston led the officers of the New South Wales Corps in arresting Governor William Bligh on the following day, 26 January 1808, in what became known as the "Rum Rebellion".

Almanacs started mentioning "First Landing Day" or "Foundation Day" and successful immigrants started holding anniversary dinners. In 1817 The Sydney Gazette and New South Wales Advertiser reported on one of these unofficial gatherings at the home of Isaac Nichols:

On Monday the 27th ult. a dinner party met at the house of Mr. Isaac Nichols, for the purpose of celebrating the Anniversary of the Institution of this Colony under Governor Philip, which took place on 26 Jan. 1788, but this year happening upon a Sunday, the commemoration dinner was reserved for the day following. The party assembled were select, and about 40 in number. At 5 in the afternoon dinner was on the table, and a more agreeable entertainment could not have been anticipated. After dinner a number of loyal toasts were drank, and a number of festive songs given; and about 10 the company parted, well gratified with the pleasures that the meeting had afforded.

— The Sydney Gazette and New South Wales Advertiser

In 1818, the 30th anniversary of the founding of the colony, Governor Lachlan Macquarie chose to acknowledge the day with the first official celebration. The governor declared that the day would be a holiday for all government workers, granting each an extra allowance of "one pound [450 grams] of fresh meat", and ordered a 30-gun salute at Dawes Point – one for each year that the colony had existed. This began a tradition that was retained by the Governors that were to follow.

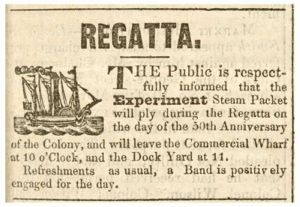
The first in what would become the Sydney Regatta tradition, 26 January 1838

Foundation Day, as it was known at the time, continued to be officially celebrated in New South Wales, and in doing so became connected with sporting events. One of these became a tradition that is still continued today: in 1837 the first running of what would become the Australia Day regatta was held on Sydney Harbour. Five races were held for different classes of boats, from first class sailing vessels to watermen's skiffs, and people viewed the festivities from both onshore and from the decks of boats on the harbour, including the steamboat Australian and the Francis Freeling—the latter running aground during the festivities and having to be refloated the next day. Happy with the success of the regatta, the organisers resolved to make it an annual event. However, some of the celebrations had gained an air of elitism, with the "United Australians" dinner being limited to those born in Australia. In describing the dinner, the Sydney Herald justified the decision, saying:

The parties who associated themselves under the title of "United Australians" have been censured for adopting a principle of exclusiveness. It is not fair so to censure them. If they invited emigrants to join them they would give offence to another class of persons – while if they invited all they would be subject to the presence of persons with whom they might not wish to associate. That was a good reason. The "Australians" had a perfect right to dine together if they wished it, and no one has a right to complain.

— The Sydney Herald

The following year, 1838, was the 50th anniversary of the founding of the colony, and as part of the celebrations Australia's first public holiday was declared. The regatta was held for a second time, and people crowded the foreshores to view the events, or joined the five steamers (Maitland, Experiment, Australia, Rapid, and the miniature steamer Firefly) to view the proceedings from the water. At midday 50 guns were fired from Dawes' Battery as the Royal Standard was raised, and in the evening rockets and other fireworks lit the sky. The dinner was a smaller affair than the previous year, with only 40 in attendance compared to the 160 from 1837, and the anniversary as a whole was described as a "day for everyone".

=== 1839–1935 ===
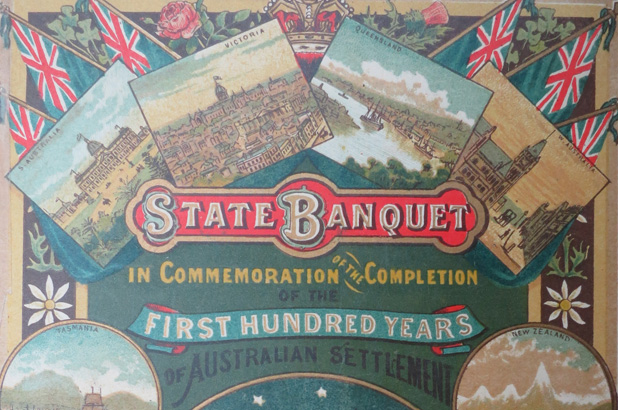
NSW state banquet to commemorate "the first 100 years of Australian settlement", 26 January 1888

Prior to 1888, 26 January was very much a New South Wales affair, as each of the colonies had its own commemoration for its founding. In Tasmania, Regatta Day occurred initially in December to mark the anniversary of the landing of Abel Tasman. South Australia celebrated Proclamation Day on 28 December. Western Australia had its own Foundation Day (now Western Australia Day) on 1 June.

The decision to mark the occasion of the First Fleet's arrival in 1788 at Sydney Cove and Captain Arthur Phillip's proclamation of British sovereignty over the eastern continent on 26 January was first made outside New South Wales by the Australian Natives' Association (ANA), a group of white "native-born" middle-class men formed in Victoria in 1871. They dubbed the day "ANA Day".

In 1888, all colonial capitals except Adelaide celebrated "Anniversary Day". In 1910, South Australia adopted 26 January as "Foundation Day", to replace another holiday known as Accession Day, which had been held on 22 January to mark the accession to the throne of King Edward VII, who died in May 1910.

The first Australia Day was established in response to Australia's involvement in World War I. In 1915, Ellen "Ellie" Wharton Kirke MBE, née Clements, mother of four servicemen, thought up the idea of a national day, with the specific aim of raising funds for wounded soldiers, and the term was coined to stir up patriotic feelings. In 1915 a committee to celebrate Australia Day was formed, and the date chosen was 30 July, on which many fund-raising efforts were run to support the war effort. It was also held in July in subsequent years of World War I: on 28 July 1916, 27 July 1917, and 26 July 1918.

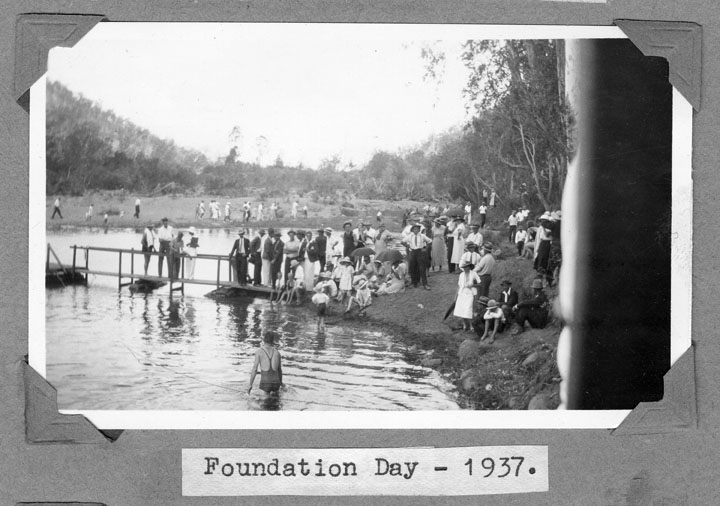
Foundation Day celebrations in Somerset Region, Queensland, 1937

The idea of a national day to be celebrated on 26 January was slow to catch on, partly because of competition with Anzac Day. Victoria adopted 26 January as Australia Day in 1931, and by 1935, all states of Australia were celebrating 26 January as Australia Day (although it was still known as Anniversary Day in New South Wales). The name "Foundation Day" persisted in local usage.

=== 1936–1960s ===
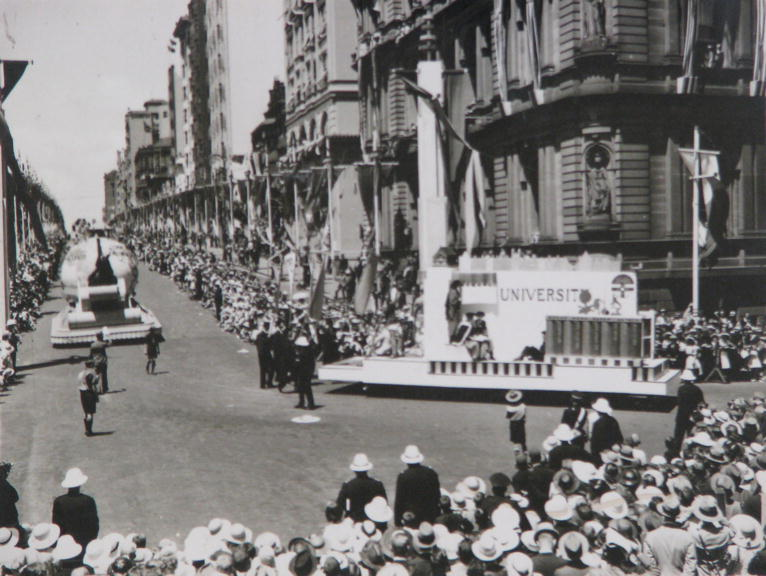
Sesquicentenary parade in Sydney, 26 January 1938

The 150th anniversary of British settlement in Australia in 1938 was widely celebrated. Preparations began in 1936 with the formation of a Celebrations Council. In that year, New South Wales was the only state to abandon the traditional long weekend, and the annual Anniversary Day public holiday was held on the anniversary day – Wednesday 26 January. However, it was also a declared a Day of Mourning by the Aborigines Progressive Association and the Australian Aborigines League as a protest against the "Whiteman's seizure of our country".

The Commonwealth and state governments agreed to unify the celebrations on 26 January as "Australia Day" in 1946, although the public holiday was instead taken on the Monday closest to the anniversary.

The Nationality and Citizenship Act 1948 came into effect on 26 January 1949, creating Australian citizenship for the first time. Previously, Australian nationals were simply British subjects alongside all other members of Commonwealth of Nations; now they were both British subjects and Australian citizens.

Historian Ken Inglis wrote in 1967 that Australia Day was not celebrated publicly in Canberra at that time.

=== 1988: Bicentenary ===
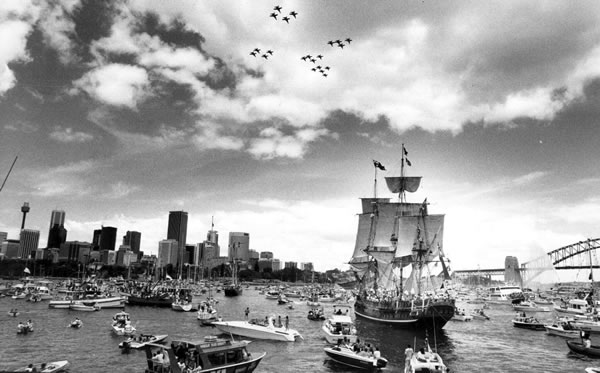
Sydney Harbour, 26 January 1988

In 1988, the celebration of 200 years since the arrival of the First Fleet was organised on a large scale as the Australian Bicentenary, with many significant events taking place in all major cities. Over 2.5 million people attended the event in Sydney. These included street parties, concerts, including performances on the steps and forecourt of the Sydney Opera House and at many other public venues, art and literary competitions, historic re-enactments, and the opening of the Powerhouse Museum at its new location. A re-enactment of the arrival of the First Fleet took place in Sydney Harbour, with ships that had sailed from Portsmouth a year earlier taking part.

== Contemporary celebrations ==
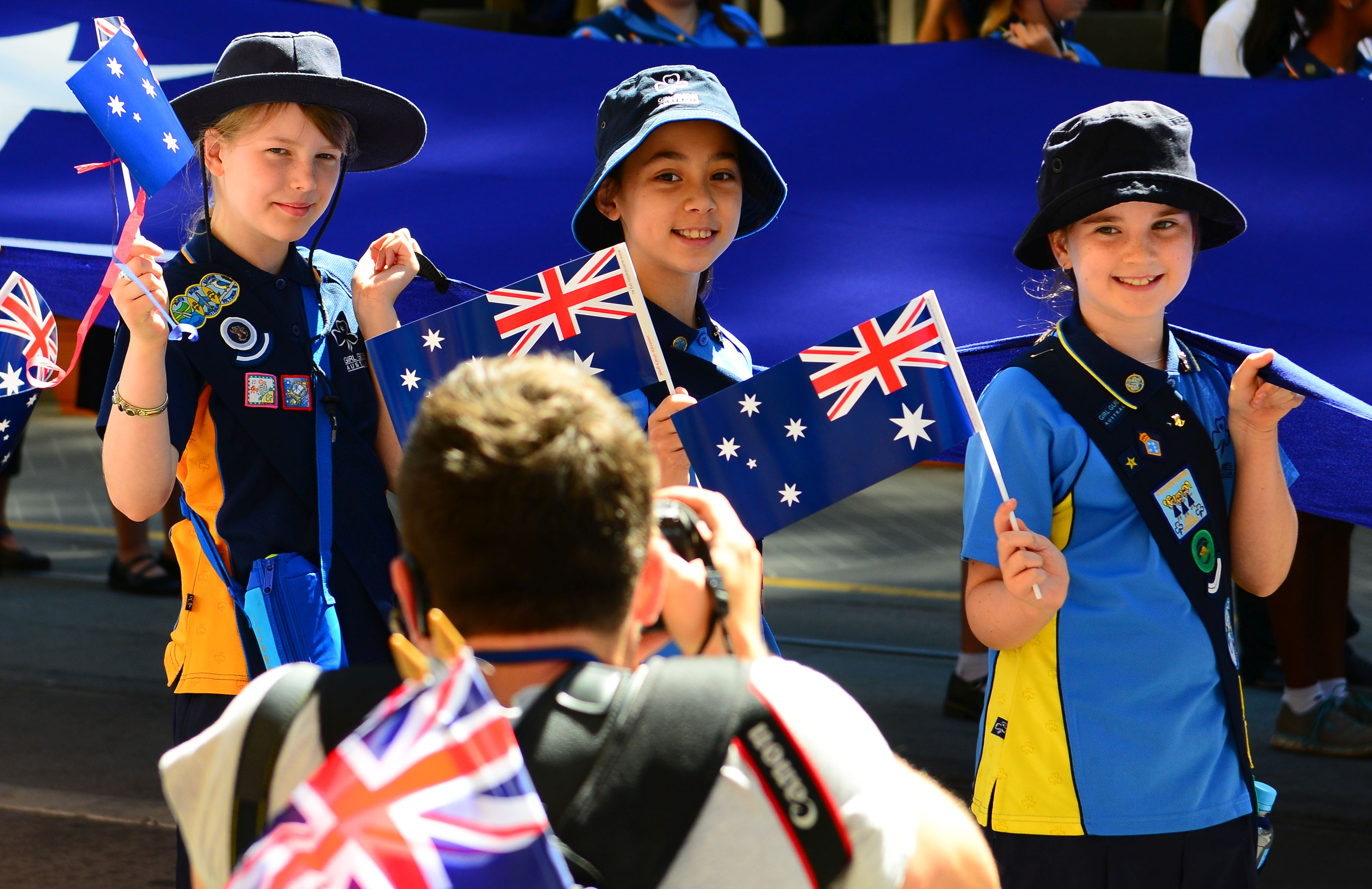
Australia Day in Perth

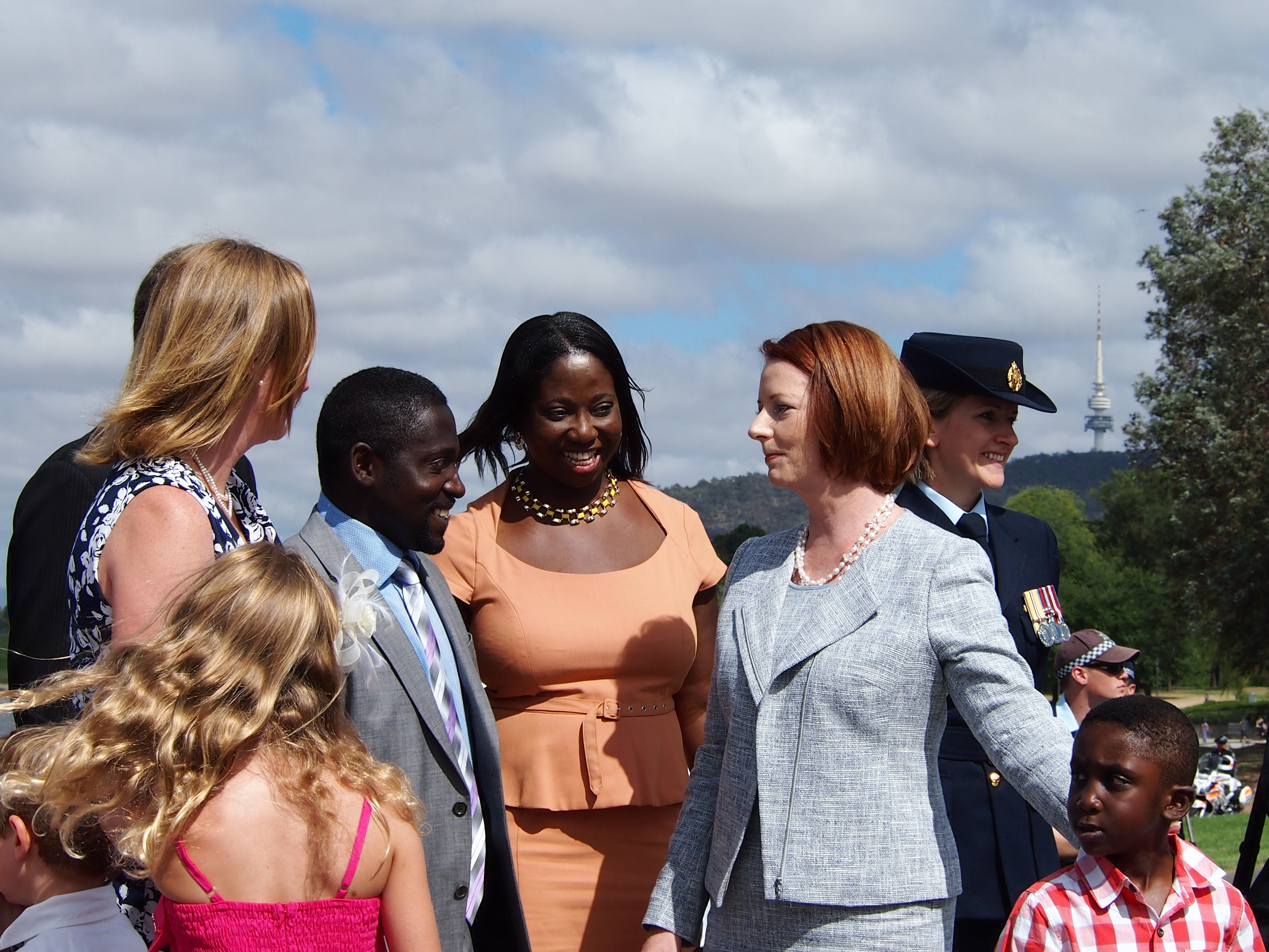
Prime Minister Julia Gillard at the 2013 National Flag Raising and Citizenship Ceremony in Canberra

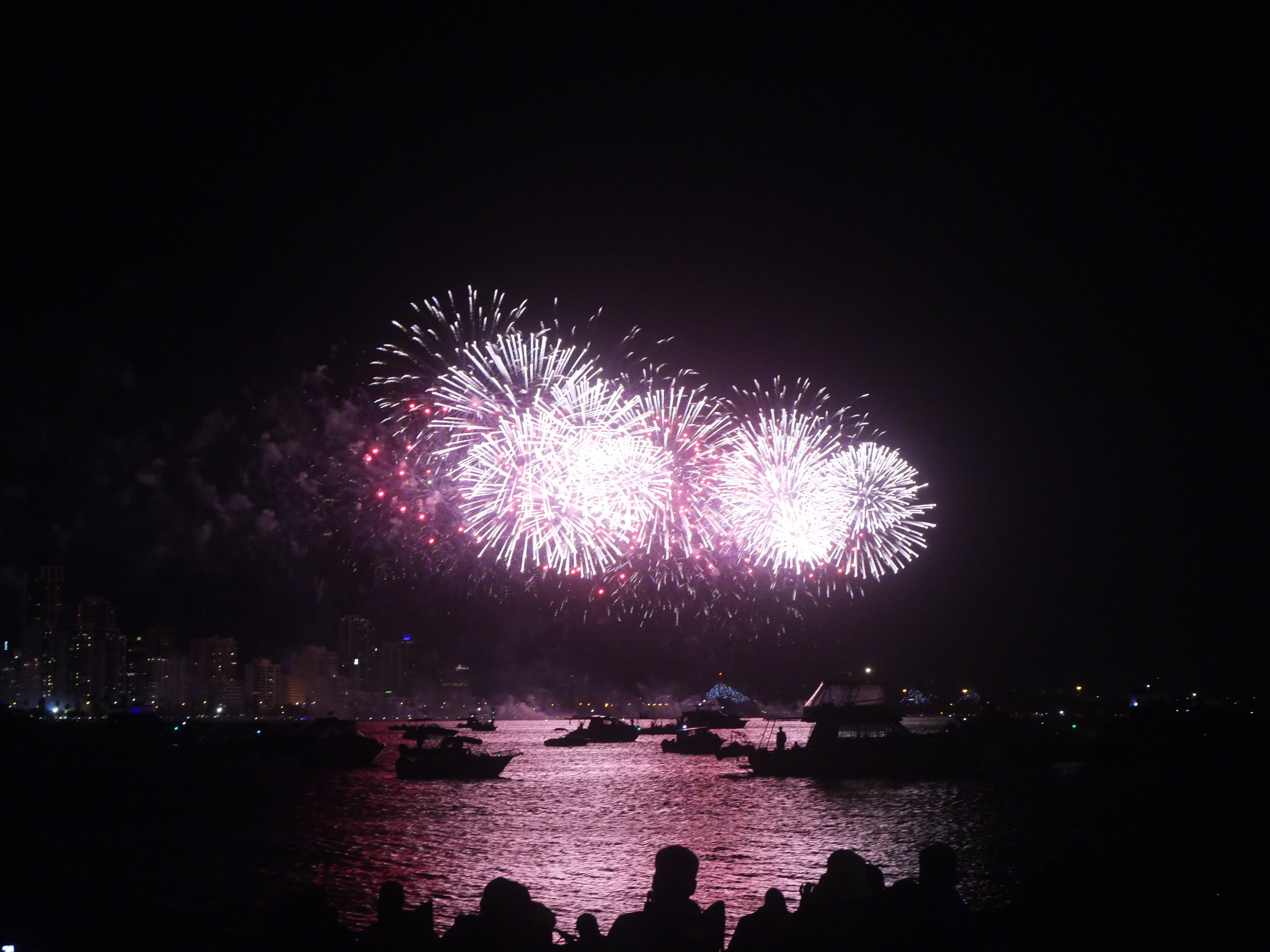
Fireworks in Perth in 2025

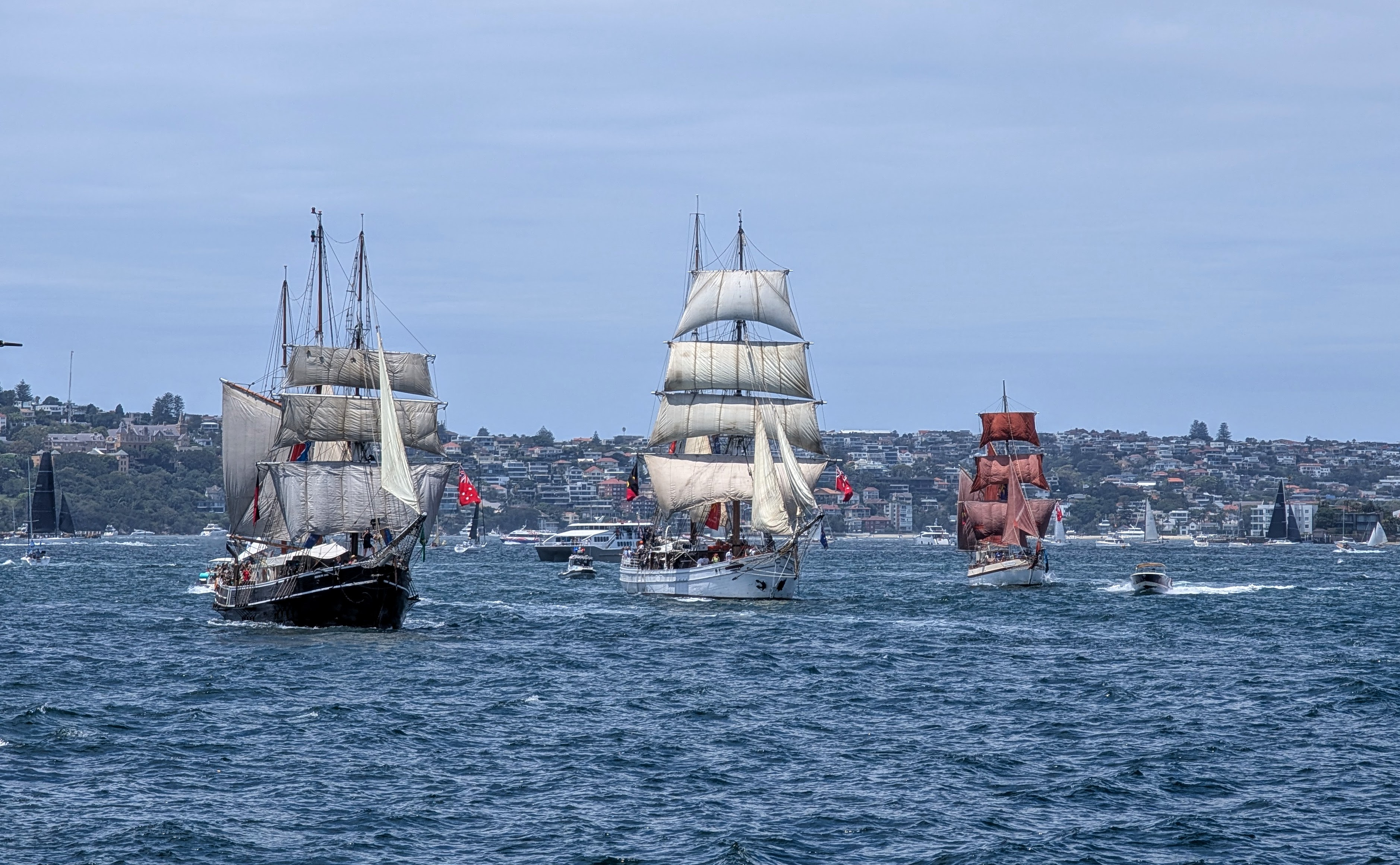
Some of the tall ships participating in the 2025 Australia Day tall ship race in Sydney Harbour, as seen from the tall ship James Craig

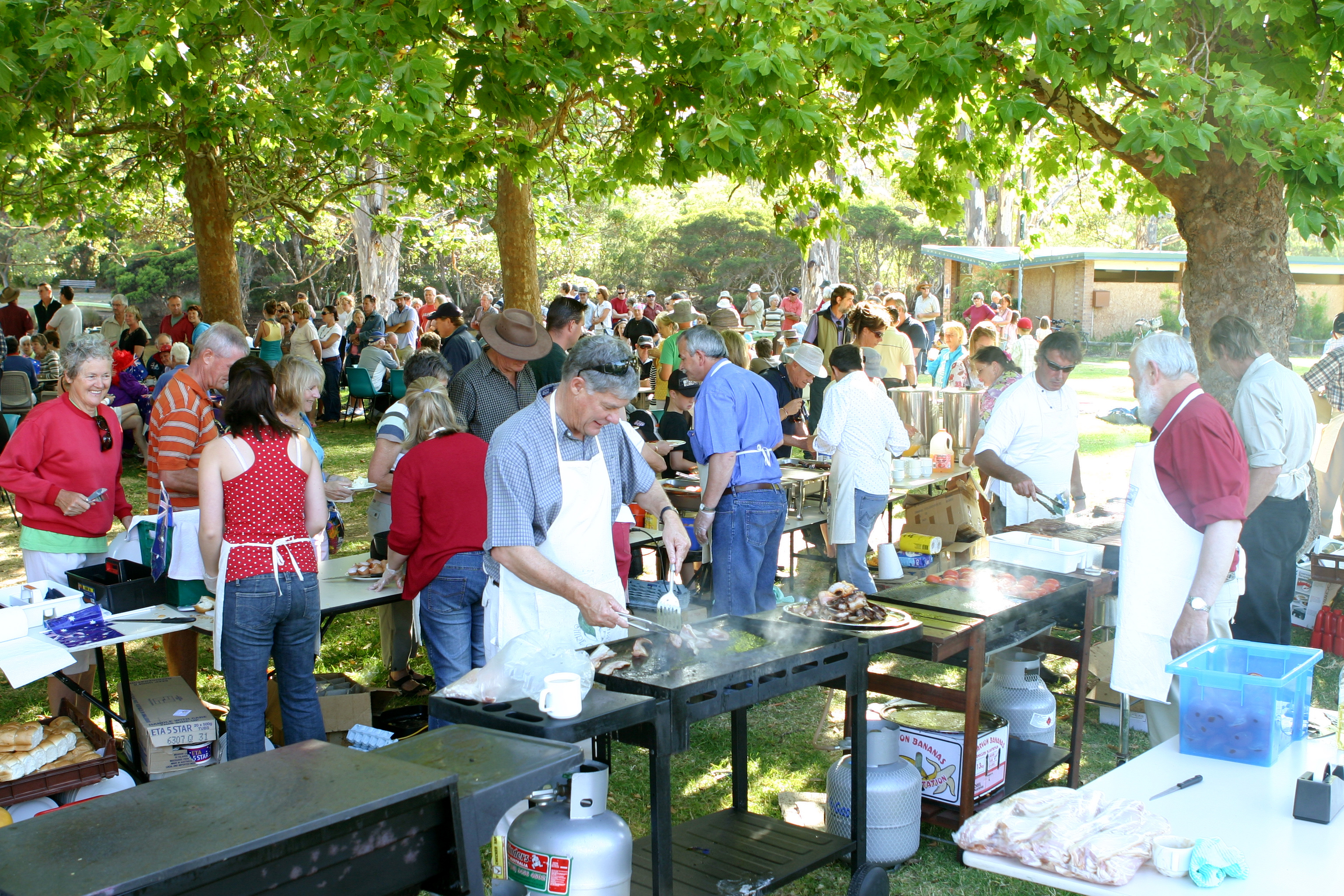
Australia Day barbecue at Berridge Park, Denmark, Western Australia

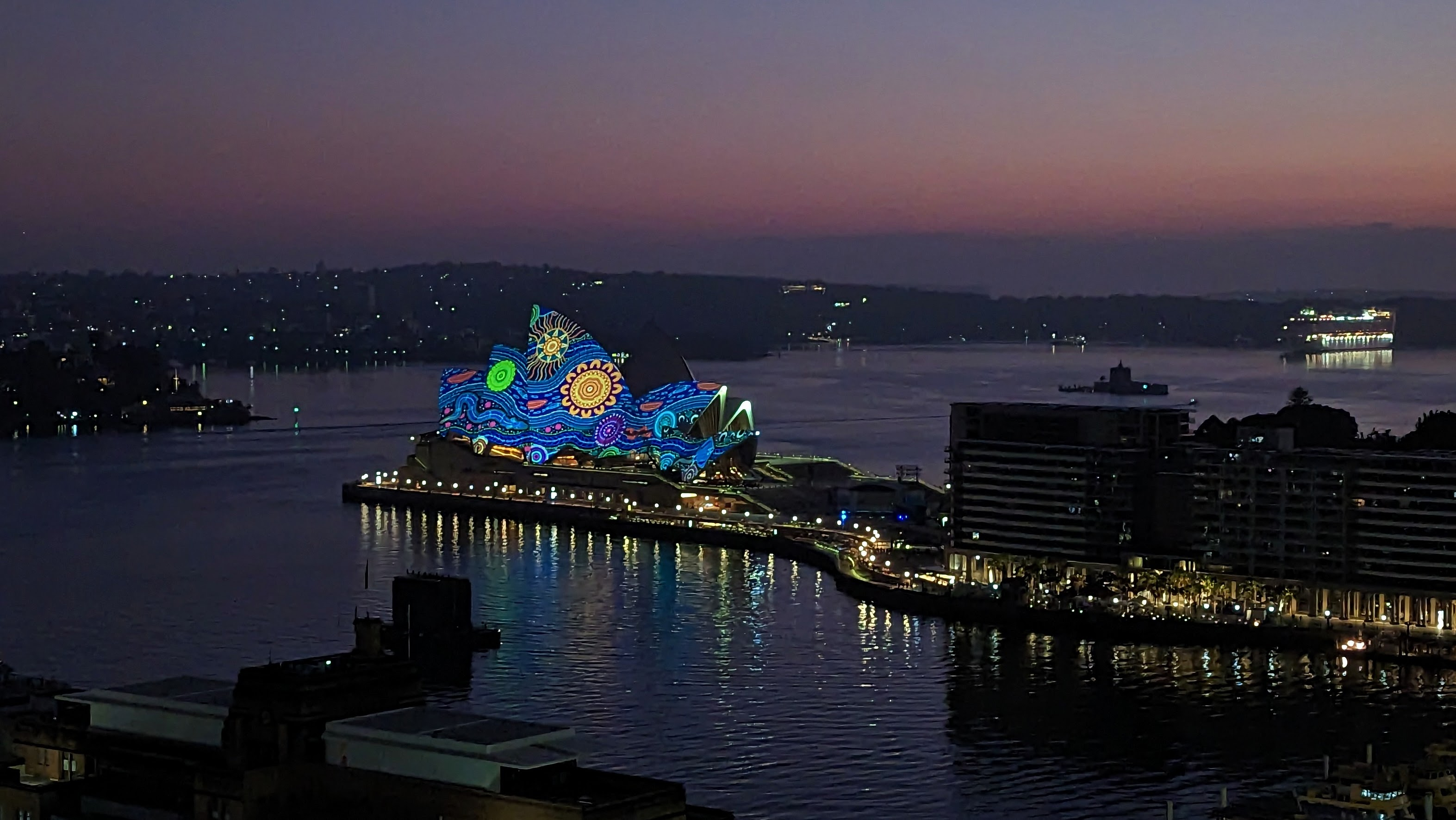
"Dawn Reflections" Indigenous art display on the Sydney Opera House, Australia Day 2023

The various celebrations and civic ceremonies such as citizenship ceremonies, the Australian of the Year awards and the Australia Day Honours (introduced in 1975) started being performed on Australia Day from around the 1950s.

After 1988, participation in Australia Day increased, and in 1994 all states and territories began to celebrate a unified public holiday on 26 January – regardless of the day of the week – for the first time. Previously, some states had celebrated the public holiday on a Monday or Friday to provide a long weekend. Research conducted in 2007 reported that 28% of Australians polled attended an organised Australia Day event and a further 26% celebrated with family and friends. This reflected the results of an earlier research project where 66% of respondents anticipated that they would actively celebrate Australia Day 2005.

Outdoor concerts, community barbecues, sports competitions, festivals and fireworks are some of the many events held in communities across Australia. These official events are presented by the National Australia Day Council, an official council or committee in each state and territory, and local committees.

In Sydney, the harbour is a focus and boat races are held, such as a ferry race and the tall ships race. In Adelaide, the key celebrations are "Australia Day in the City" involving a parade, concert and fireworks display held in Elder Park, with a new outdoor art installation in 2019 designed to acknowledge, remember and recognise Aboriginal people who have contributed to the community. Featuring the People's March and the Voyages Concert, Melbourne's events focus strongly on the celebration of multiculturalism. In Perth, for many years until 2022, the Skyworks were the largest single event presented each Australia Day; the display was replaced by a more modest one coupled with a drone show the following year.

Since 2012, with the exceptions of 2015 and 2020–22, a Big Blue match between Melbourne Victory FC and Sydney FC has been played annually on Australia Day.

Citizenship ceremonies are also commonly held, with Australia Day now the largest occasion for the acquisition of Australian citizenship. On 26 January 2011, more than 300 citizenship ceremonies took place and around 13,000 people from 143 countries took Australian citizenship. In recent years many citizenship ceremonies have included an affirmation by existing citizens. Research conducted in 2007 reported that 78.6% of respondents thought that citizenship ceremonies were an important feature of the day. In September 2019, the Morrison government amended the Australian Citizenship Ceremonies Code to require local councils to hold a citizenship ceremony on Australia Day.

The official Australia Day Ambassador Program supports celebrations in communities across the nation by facilitating the participation of high-achieving Australians in local community celebrations. In 2011, 385 ambassadors participated in 384 local community celebrations. The Order of Australia awards are also a feature of the day. The Australia Day Achievement Medallion is awarded to citizens by local governments based on excellence in both government and non-government organisations. The governor-general and prime minister both address the nation. On the eve of Australia Day each year, the Prime Minister announces the winner of the Australian of the Year award, presented to an Australian citizen who has shown a "significant contribution to the Australian community and nation" and is an "inspirational role model for the Australian community". Subcategories of the award include Young Australian of the Year and Senior Australian of the Year, and an award for Australia's Local Hero.

Research in 2009 indicated that Australians reflect on history and future fairly equally on Australia Day. Of those polled, 43% agreed that history is the most important thing to think about on Australia Day and 41% said they look towards "our future", while 13% thought it was important to "think about the present at this time" and 3% were unsure. Despite the date reflecting the arrival of the First Fleet, contemporary celebrations are not particularly historical in their theme. There are no large-scale re-enactments and the national leader's participation is focused largely on events such as the Australian of the Year Awards announcement and Citizenship Ceremonies.

Possibly reflecting a shift in Australians' understanding of the place of Indigenous Australians in their national identity, Newspoll research in November 2009 reported that ninety percent of Australians polled believed "it was important to recognise Australia's indigenous people and culture" as part of Australia Day celebrations. A similar proportion (89%) agreed that "it is important to recognise the cultural diversity of the nation".

== Debate ==
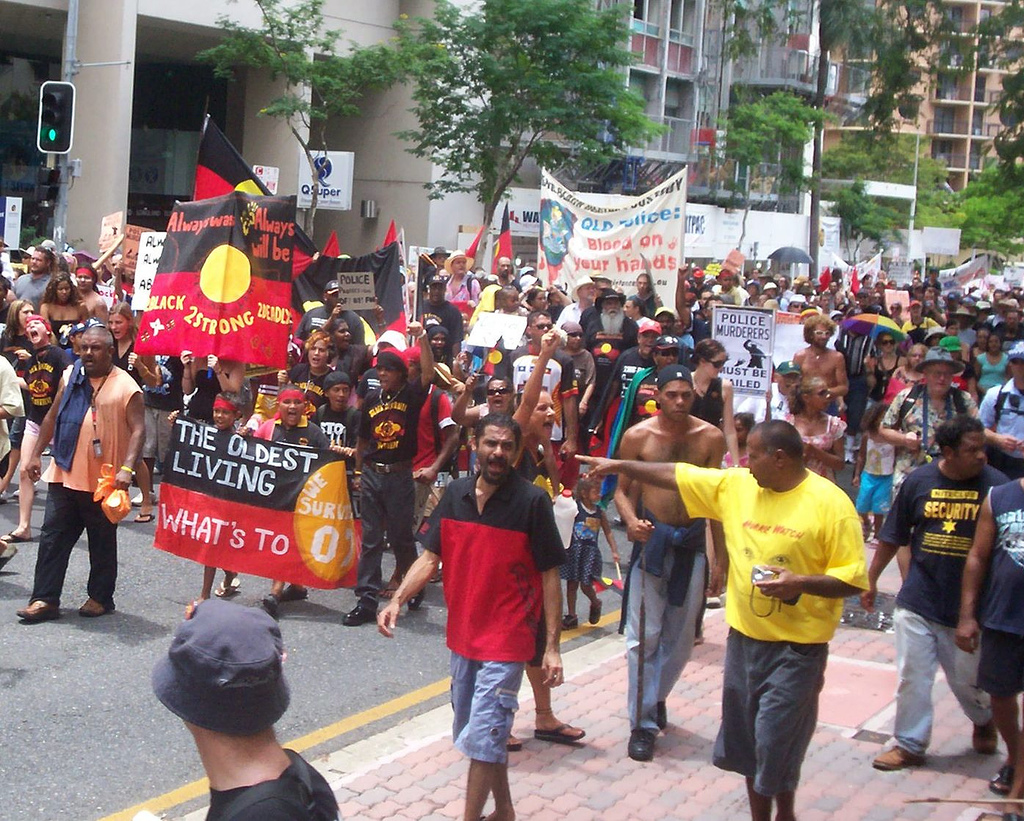
Invasion Day rally in Brisbane, 2007

Some Australians regard Australia Day as a symbol of the adverse impacts of British settlement on Australia's Indigenous peoples. In 1888, prior to the first centennial anniversary of the First Fleet landing on 26 January 1788, New South Wales premier Henry Parkes was asked about inclusion of Aboriginal people in the celebrations. He replied: "And remind them that we have robbed them?"

The 150th anniversary celebrations in 1938 were accompanied by an Aboriginal Day of Mourning, declared by the Aborigines Progressive Association and the Australian Aborigines League as a protest against the "Whiteman's seizure of our country". At the bicentennial celebrations in 1988, large gathering of Aboriginal people in Sydney led an "Invasion Day" commemoration marking the loss of Indigenous culture. Some Indigenous figures and others continue to label Australia Day as "Invasion Day", and protests occur almost every year, sometimes at Australia Day events. Thousands of people participate in protest marches in capital cities on Australia Day; estimates for the 2018 protest in Melbourne ranged into tens of thousands.

The anniversary is also termed by some as "Survival Day" and marked by events such as the Survival Day concert, first held in Sydney in 1992, celebrating the fact that the Indigenous people and culture have survived despite colonisation and discrimination. In 2016, National Indigenous Television chose the name "Survival Day" as its preferred choice on the basis that it acknowledges the mixed nature of the day, saying that the term "recognises the invasion", but does not allow that to frame the entire story of the Aboriginal people.

In response, official celebrations have tried to include Indigenous people, holding ceremonies such as the Woggan-ma-gule ceremony, inaugurated at Barangaroo Reserve in Sydney in 2003, which celebrates Indigenous culture with song, dance, and storytelling, honouring the past and celebrating the present. The ceremony was directed by Rhoda Roberts from 2003 until 2013. It has continued under a new name, WugulOra, which means "one mob".

Several major employers, both public and private, including the Australian Public Service, permit employees to work on Australia Day and take another day off.

Extensive polling on the naming and observance of the day has been conducted over the years, with varying results depending on the question and the pollster. A January 2026 Roy Morgan poll found 72% support for the name and 60.5% support for the date of the day. A poll taken for The Sydney Morning Herald found majority support for Australia Day on its date in every generation.

== See also ==
- Culture of Australia
- Australian nationalism
