= Carl Riseley =

Australian singer

- Origin: Gold Coast, Queensland, Australia
- Genres: Pop, jazz
- Years active: 2007–present
- Label: Universal Music Australia
- Website: Official website

Carl Riseley (born 21 December 1982) is an Australian jazz and pop music singer.

== Early life and career origins ==
Born on the Gold Coast in 1982, Riseley started out playing the cornet, and progressed to the trumpet when he was sixteen. Riseley joined The Royal Australian Navy band in April 2003, as a trumpeter. His singing career began in late 2003 when the Navy Rock Band were deployed on HMAS Tobruk to tour around Asia & Australia, but did not have a singer. The vacancy was filled by Riseley, who has remained a vocalist.

During his time with the Royal Australian Navy, Riseley was deployed in the Solomon Islands, and played for the troops in Iraq on New Year's Eve in 2004 and 2005.

== Performing and recording career ==
In 2007, Riseley tried out for the fifth season of Australian Idol. When he failed to progress into the top 12 on the basis of viewer votes, he was given a "wild card" entry. He was sometimes criticised for remaining steadfastly within his style of swing, jazz and big band, but progressed until his elimination as one of the top three.

He was signed by Mercury Australia, and an album of cover versions, titled The Rise, was released on 26 April 2008, debuting and peaking at No. 5 on the ARIA Albums Chart. His second album, The Stillest Hour, was released on 24 April 2009 and peaked at No. 21 on the ARIA Albums Chart as well as No.1 on the ARIA Jazz & Blues Albums Chart.

== Television ==
- Australian Idol: Top Three (2007)
- New Year's Eve Concert: Sydney Opera House (2007)

== Discography ==
=== Albums ===
List of albums, with selected details and chart positions
Title	Details	Charts
Title	Details	AUS
The Rise	Released: 26 April 2008 (Australia); Label: Universal Music Australia	5
The Stillest Hour	Released: 24 April 2009 (Australia); Label: Universal Music Australia	21
