= Anthony Callea discography =

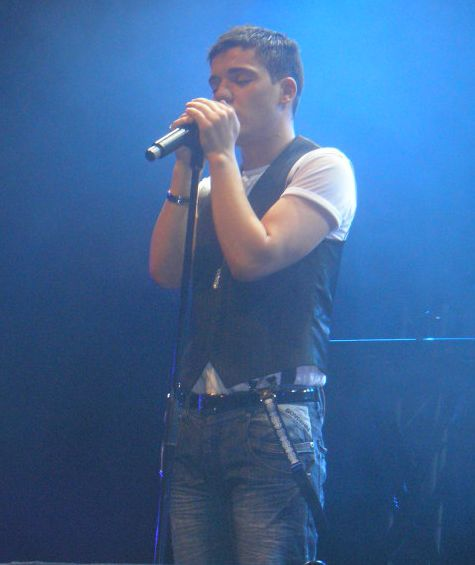
- Callea performing at The Palms at Crown Concert, 8 December 2008
- Studio albums: 7
- EPs: 1
- Live albums: 1
- Singles: 15
- Video albums: 2

Australian singer and songwriter Anthony Callea has released seven studio albums, one live album, one extended play and fifteen singles.

== Albums ==
=== Studio albums ===
List of albums, with selected chart positions and certifications
Title	Album details	Peak chart positions	Certifications
Title	Album details	AUS	Certifications
Anthony Callea	Released: 25 March 2005; Format: CD, digital download; Label: Sony Music Australia	1	ARIA: 2× Platinum
A New Chapter	Released: 26 November 2006; Format: CD, digital download; Label: Sony Music Australia	9	ARIA: Gold
Thirty	Released: 26 April 2013; Format: CD, digital download; Label: ABC Music	18	
This Is Christmas	Released: 8 November 2013; Format: CD, digital download; Label: ABC Music	37	
Backbone	Released: 16 September 2016; Format: CD, digital download; Label: Sony Music Australia	1	
ARIA Number 1 Hits in Symphony	Released: 1 September 2017; Format: CD, digital download; Label: Sony Music Australia	1	
Forty Love	Released: 21 October 2022; Format: CD, digital download; Label: Vox Enterprises	5	

=== Live albums ===
Title	Album details
Ladies & Gentlemen: The Songs of George Michael	Released: 1 August 2014; Format: CD, digital download; Label: ABC Music

=== Video albums ===
List of live albums, with selected chart positions and certifications
Title	Album details	Peak chart positions	Certification
Title	Album details	AUS DVD	Certification
Anthony Callea Live in Concert	Released: November 2005; Format: DVD, Blu-ray; Label: Sony Music	3	ARIA: Platinum
Ladies & Gentlemen: The Songs of George Michael	Released: 1 August 2014; Format: DVD, Blu-ray; Label: ABC Music	1	

== Extended plays ==
Title	Album details
Last to Go	Released: 21 February 2012; Format: Digital download; Label: Vox Enterprises

== Singles ==
List of singles, with selected chart positions
Year	Title	Peak chart positions	Certifications	Album
Year	Title	AUS	Certifications	Album
2004	"The Prayer"	1	ARIA: 4× Platinum	Anthony Callea
2005	"Rain" / "Bridge over Troubled Water"	1	ARIA: 2× Platinum	Anthony Callea
2005	"Hurts So Bad"	10		Anthony Callea
2005	"Per Sempre (for Always)"	5		Anthony Callea
2006	"Live for Love"	9		A New Chapter
2007	"Addicted to You"	19		A New Chapter
2011	"Oh Oh Oh Oh"	111		Last to Go
2012	"Last to Go"	—		Last to Go
2015	"Christmas Day"	—		Non-album singles
2019	"What's Wrong with Me?"	— (Note: "What's Wrong with Me?" did not enter the ARIA Singles Chart, but peaked at number 35 on the ARIA Digital Track Chart.)		Non-album singles
2020	"Lonely"	—		Non-album singles
2020	"Shadows"	—		Non-album singles
2020	"Together Again" (with Bonnie Anderson)	— (Note: "Together Again" did not enter the ARIA Singles Chart, but peaked at number 8 on the Australian Digital Songs Sales Chart.)		Non-album singles
2022	"Heaven"	—		Forty Love
2022	"Only One"	—		Forty Love
"—" denotes releases that did not chart.

== Soundtrack appearances ==
Year	Song	Artist(s)	Movie
2006	"The Healing of a Heart"	Anthony Callea	Bambi II

== Album appearances ==
Year	Song	Artist(s)	Album
2004	"I Want to Know What Love Is"	Anthony Callea	Australian Idol: The Final 12
2005	"The Christmas Song"	Anthony Callea	The Spirit of Christmas 2005
2006	"Home"	Anthony Callea	Home: Songs of Hope & Journey
2009	"O Holy Night"	Anthony Callea	Stars of Christmas
2012	"The Prayer"	Tina Arena/Anthony Callea	Symphony of Life
2012	"I Want to Spend My Lifetime Loving You"	Tina Arena/Anthony Callea	Symphony of Life
2026	"Welcome Home"	Mark Holden	Now & Then & Shirley MacLaine
