= List of top 10 singles for 2005 in Australia =

This is a list of singles that charted in the top ten of the ARIA Charts in 2005.

== Top-ten singles ==
Key

Symbol	Meaning
◁	Indicates single's top 10 entry was also its ARIA top 50 debut
(#)	2005 Year-end top 10 single position and rank

List of ARIA top ten singles that peaked in 2005
Top ten entry date	Single	Artist(s)	Peak	Peak date	Weeks in top ten	References
Singles from 2004
20 December	"Numb/Encore" ◁	Jay-Z and Linkin Park	3	17 January	10	
20 December	"Boulevard of Broken Dreams" ◁	Green Day	5	10 January	7	
Singles from 2005
10 January	"Wonderful"	Ja Rule featuring R. Kelly and Ashanti	6	17 January	5	
17 January	"Rumors"	Lindsay Lohan	10	17 January	1	
24 January	"Nasty Girl" (#8) ◁	Nitty	1	24 January	9	
24 January	"Over and Over" (#5) ◁	Nelly featuring Tim McGraw	1	7 February	10	
24 January	"Drop It Like It's Hot" ◁	Snoop Dogg featuring Pharrell	4	24 January	6	
24 January	"Underwear Goes Inside the Pants" ◁	Lazyboy	5	24 January	5	
24 January	"Mistaken Identity" ◁	Delta Goodrem	7	24 January	2	
24 January	"Pony" ◁	Kasey Chambers	10	24 January	1	
31 January	"Like Toy Soldiers" ◁	Eminem	4	31 January	3	
7 February	"Since U Been Gone" ◁	Kelly Clarkson	3	7 February	6	
7 February	"La La" ◁	Ashlee Simpson	10	7 February	4	
14 February	"Soldier" ◁	Destiny's Child featuring T.I. and Lil Wayne	3	14 February	3	
21 February	"Get Right" ◁	Jennifer Lopez	3	21 February	6	
21 February	"Let Me Love You" (#7) ◁	Mario	3	14 March	13	
28 February	"Rich Girl" ◁	Gwen Stefani featuring Eve	2	28 February	7	
28 February	"Beautiful Soul"	Jesse McCartney	1	4 April	9	
7 March	"Evie Parts 1, 2 & 3" ◁	The Wrights	2	7 March	3	
7 March	"Do Somethin'" ◁	Britney Spears	8	7 March	1	
7 March	"1, 2 Step" ◁	Ciara featuring Missy Elliott	2	18 April	12	
14 March	"Almost Here" ◁	Brian McFadden and Delta Goodrem	1	14 March	9	
21 March	"Rain / Bridge Over Troubled Water" ◁	Anthony Callea	1	21 March	4	
21 March	"Candy Shop" ◁	50 Cent featuring Olivia	3	4 April	7	
4 April	"Lonely No More" ◁	Rob Thomas	3	2 May	12	
4 April	"It's Like That" ◁	Mariah Carey	9	4 April	3	
4 April	"Switch (#6) "	Will Smith	1	16 May	13	
11 April	"The Special Two" ◁	Missy Higgins	2	11 April	8	
18 April	"Giving You Up" ◁	Kylie Minogue	8	18 April	1	
25 April	"Stop the Music"	P-Money	7	23 May	7	
2 May	"Signs" ◁	Snoop Dogg featuring Justin Timberlake and Charlie Wilson	1	2 May	7	
2 May	"Girl" ◁	Destiny's Child	5	2 May	5	
2 May	"Mockingbird" ◁	Eminem	9	2 May	1	
9 May	"Obsession (No Es Amor)"	Frankie J featuring Baby Bash	5	13 June	9	
16 May	"Feel Good Inc." (#9) ◁	Gorillaz featuring De La Soul	3	23 May	14	
23 May	"Don't Phunk with My Heart" (#10) ◁	The Black Eyed Peas	1	23 May	10	
30 May	"Hollaback Girl" ◁	Gwen Stefani	1	30 May	8	
30 May	"Speed of Sound" ◁	Coldplay	9	30 May	1	
6 June	"Best of You" ◁	Foo Fighters	5	6 June	2	
13 June	"She's No You" ◁	Jesse McCartney	10	13 June	1	
20 June	"Incomplete" ◁	Backstreet Boys	1	20 June	9	
20 June	"Hell No!" ◁	Ricki-Lee	5	20 June	3	
20 June	"Put Your Hand Up" ◁	Random	7	20 June	2	
20 June	"Voodoo Child"	Rogue Traders	4	15 August	12	
27 June	"We Belong Together" ◁	Mariah Carey	1	27 June	8	
27 June	"Behind These Hazel Eyes" ◁	Kelly Clarkson	6	27 June	3	
11 July	"Lonely" (#3) ◁	Akon	1	11 July	10	
11 July	"Lose Control" ◁	Missy Elliott featuring Ciara and Fat Man Scoop	7	18 July	8	
11 July	"Hurts So Bad" ◁	Anthony Callea	10	11 July	1	
18 July	"Untitled (How Could This Happen to Me?)"	Simple Plan	9	18 July	2	
18 July	"Bad Day"	Daniel Powter	3	15 August	11	
25 July	"Axel F" (#4) ◁	Crazy Frog	1	25 July	11	
25 July	"Oh" ◁	Ciara featuring Ludacris	7	25 July	5	
8 August	"Schnappi, das kleine Krokodil"	Schnappi	6	15 August	8	
22 August	"Ghetto Gospel" ◁	2Pac featuring Elton John	1	22 August	9	
22 August	"4ever" ◁	The Veronicas	2	31 October	12	
22 August	"Ass Like That"	Eminem	10	22 August	1	
29 August	"Don't Cha" (#2) ◁	The Pussycat Dolls featuring Busta Rhymes	1	29 August	14	
29 August	"Don't Lie" ◁	The Black Eyed Peas	6	29 August	3	
5 September	"Cool" ◁	Gwen Stefani	10	5 September	1	
12 September	"You're Beautiful"	James Blunt	2	7 November	14	
12 September	"These Boots Are Made for Walkin'" ◁	Jessica Simpson	2	26 September	13	
12 September	"Have a Nice Day" ◁	Bon Jovi	8	12 September	1	
12 September	"Crash" ◁	Chloe	10	12 September	1	
19 September	"Photograph" ◁	Nickelback	3	19 September	6	
26 September	"Pon de Replay"	Rihanna	6	14 November	10	
3 October	"Shine" ◁	Shannon Noll	1	3 October	9	
10 October	"Shake It Off" ◁	Mariah Carey	6	10 October	4	
10 October	"Tripping" ◁	Robbie Williams	7	10 October	1	
17 October	"Gold Digger" ◁	Kanye West featuring Jamie Foxx	1	24 October	9	
17 October	"Per Sempre (For Always)" ◁	Anthony Callea	5	17 October	1	
24 October	"Sunshine"	Ricki-Lee	8	24 October	1	
31 October	"Boyfriend" ◁	Ashlee Simpson	8	31 October	3	
31 October	"Way to Go!"	Rogue Traders	7	14 November	3	
7 November	"So Beautiful" ◁	Darren Hayes	7	7 November	1	
14 November	"Hung Up" ◁	Madonna	1	14 November	11	
14 November	"Moonshine" ◁	Savage featuring Akon	9	14 November	2	
21 November	"My Humps" ◁	The Black Eyed Peas	1	21 November	9	
21 November	"Pretty Vegas" ◁	INXS	9	21 November	1	
28 November	"What's on Your Radio" ◁	The Living End	9	28 November	1	
5 December	"Maybe Tonight" ◁	Kate DeAraugo	1	5 December	7	
5 December	"Because of You" ◁	Kelly Clarkson	4	5 December	7	
5 December	"Last Christmas" ◁	Crazy Frog	4	12 December	3	
19 December	"Wasabi" ◁	Lee Harding	1	19 December	10	
26 December	"Jingle Bells/U Can't Touch This" ◁	Crazy Frog	7	26 December	1	

=== 2004 peaks ===
List of ARIA top ten singles in 2005 that peaked in 2004
Top ten entry date	Single	Artist(s)	Peak	Peak date	Weeks in top ten	References
4 October	"These Kids" ◁	Joel Turner & the Modern Day Poets	1	29 November	15	
8 November	"Lose My Breath" ◁	Destiny's Child	3	22 November	11	
8 November	"Welcome to My Life"	Simple Plan	7	20 December	7	
15 November	"What You Waiting For?" ◁	Gwen Stefani	1	15 November	10	
22 November	"Tilt Ya Head Back" ◁	Nelly featuring Christina Aguilera	5	22 November	9	
6 December	"Listen with Your Heart" ◁	Casey Donovan	1	6 December	5	
20 December	"The Prayer" (#1) ◁	Anthony Callea	1	20 December	9	
27 December	"C'mon Aussie C'mon" ◁	Shannon Noll	2	27 December	4	

=== 2006 peaks ===
List of ARIA top ten singles in 2005 that peaked in 2006
Top ten entry date	Single	Artist(s)	Peak	Peak date	Weeks in top ten	References
21 November	"Push the Button"	Sugababes	3	9 January	10	
5 December	"Stickwitu" ◁	The Pussycat Dolls	2	9 January	11	
12 December	"Everything I'm Not"	The Veronicas	7	16 January	8	
19 December	"Goodbye My Lover" ◁	James Blunt	3	16 January	16	

== Entries by artist ==
The following table shows artists who achieved two or more top 10 entries in 2005, including songs that reached their peak in 2004 and 2006. The figures include both main artists and featured artists. The total number of weeks an artist spent in the top ten in 2005 is also shown.
