= Shane Warne state memorial service =

Funeral held in Melbourne, Australia

The Shane Warne state memorial service was held on the evening of 30 March 2022 at Melbourne Cricket Ground to commemorate the life of the Australian cricketer Shane Warne.

== Service ==
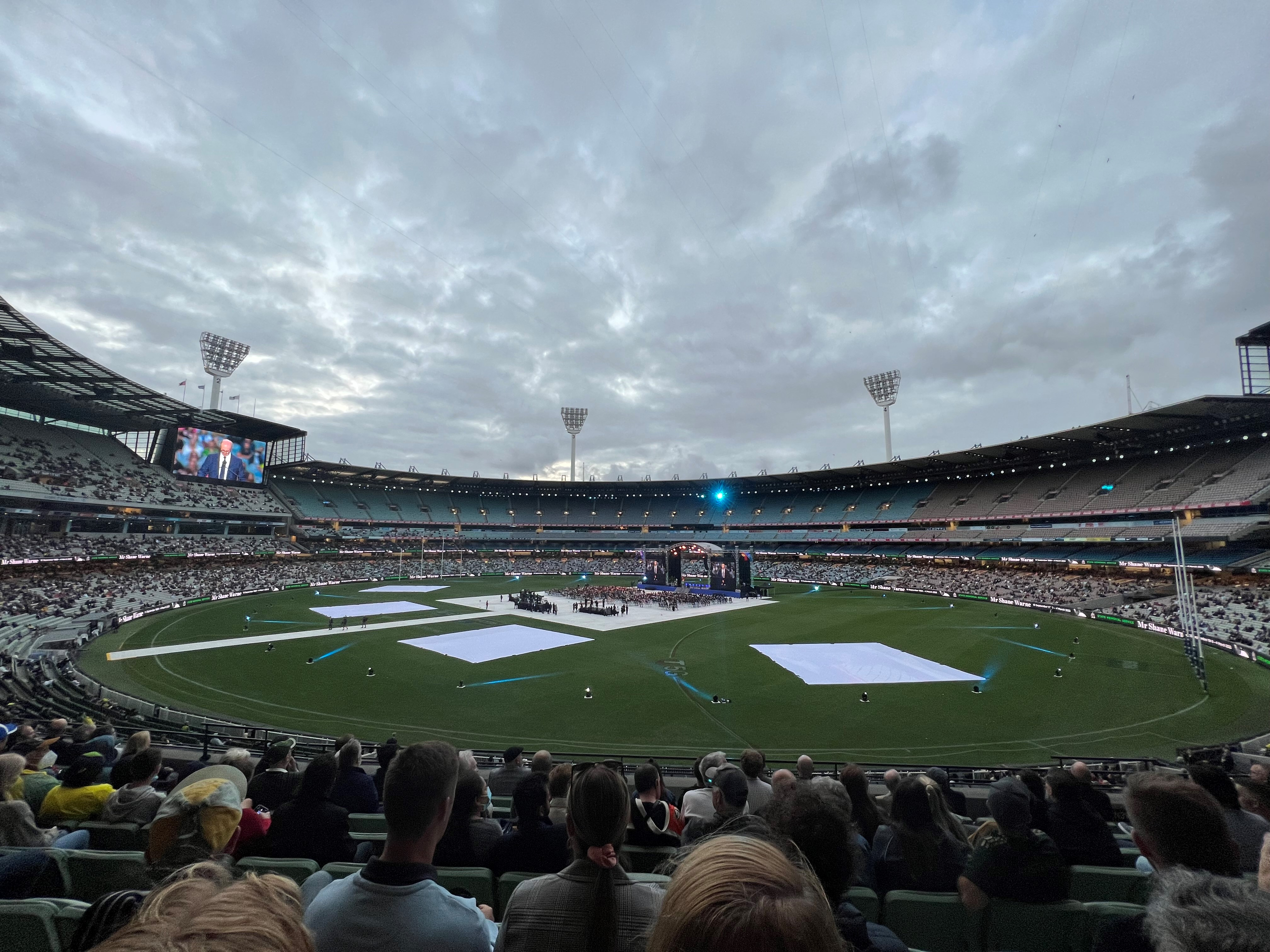
View of the Melbourne Cricket Ground before the start of the service

The service, which was free to attend and ran for around 140 minutes, was attended by about 55,000 people, broadcast on multiple channels and streamed online. The service was ultimately watched by more than 1.5 million Australians. The seats on the field were on either side of the wicket, on which stood one set of stumps with a sun hat on top and a cricket ball nearby.

Businessman, media personality and former Collingwood Football Club president Eddie McGuire, a friend of Warne's, organised the memorial and served as master of ceremonies. The memorial was opened by Greta Bradman, Donald Bradman's granddaughter, who performed the national anthem "Advance Australia Fair". The service included eulogies from Warne's children, his father, his brother Jason, and other family members and friends. During his eulogy, Warne's father said, "Shane said of himself, 'I smoked, I drank, and I played a little cricket'".

Two panels of tributes and reminiscences about Warne were included in the proceedings. First, broadcaster Mark Howard hosted a cricket panel with Australians Allan Border, Mark Taylor and Merv Hughes, England's Nasser Hussain and West Indies' Brian Lara. Hussain recalled the first game of the 1998–99 Australia Tri-Nation Series final between England and Australia in Sydney, where Warne had been stand-in captain, and he also paid tribute on behalf of English cricket fans as well as his and Warne's colleagues at Sky Sports. Lara said his score of 277 not out—his maiden Test century and double Test century—in the third Test of the 1992–93 West Indian tour of Australia in Sydney, was aided by rain in Sydney that meant Warne could not find drift.

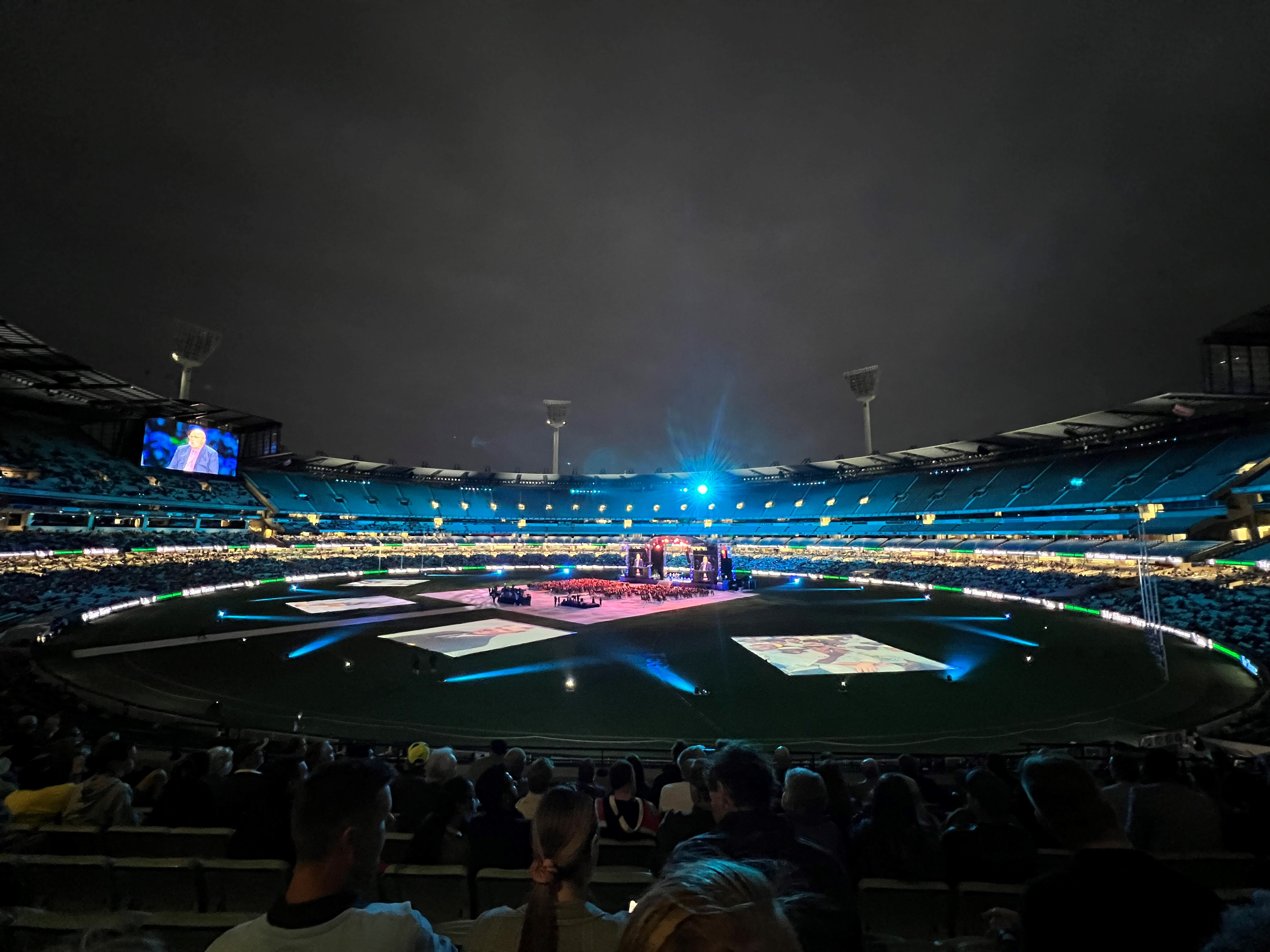
The MCG during the service

The second panel, which comedian Andy Lee hosted, focused on Warne's life outside cricket; it included a number of Warne's longtime friends. Only one cricketer was included—Warne's Hampshire teammate Dimitri Mascarenhas. The other members were comedian Glenn Robbins, retired Carlton and St Kilda footballer Aaron Hamill, and retired Geelong footballer and former co-host of The Footy Show Sam Newman.

The memorial had a line-up of musicians and celebrities who were friends with Warne, including Kylie Minogue and Hugh Jackman. Warne's former partner Elizabeth Hurley declined to appear or send a video tribute, saying she was "too emotional to encapsulate her feelings into a 30-second clip". A mixture of live and pre-recorded musical performances included Chris Martin singing a rearranged version of "Yellow", one of Warne's favourite songs; Elton John singing "Don't Let the Sun Go Down on Me"; Robbie Williams singing "Angels"; and Ed Sheeran singing "Thinking Out Loud", which was Warne's favourite Sheeran song. Jon Stevens and Anthony Callea also gave live performances; Callea sang "The Prayer" because Warne was said to be a big fan of Andrea Bocelli. Before the ending, jazz trumpeter Mat Jodrell played "When The Saints Go Marching In", which St Kilda Football Club use with some lyrical changes as their club song.

The service ran at a cost of $1.6 million, almost triple the cost of the second-most-expensive memorial service in 2022, which cost $584,204.

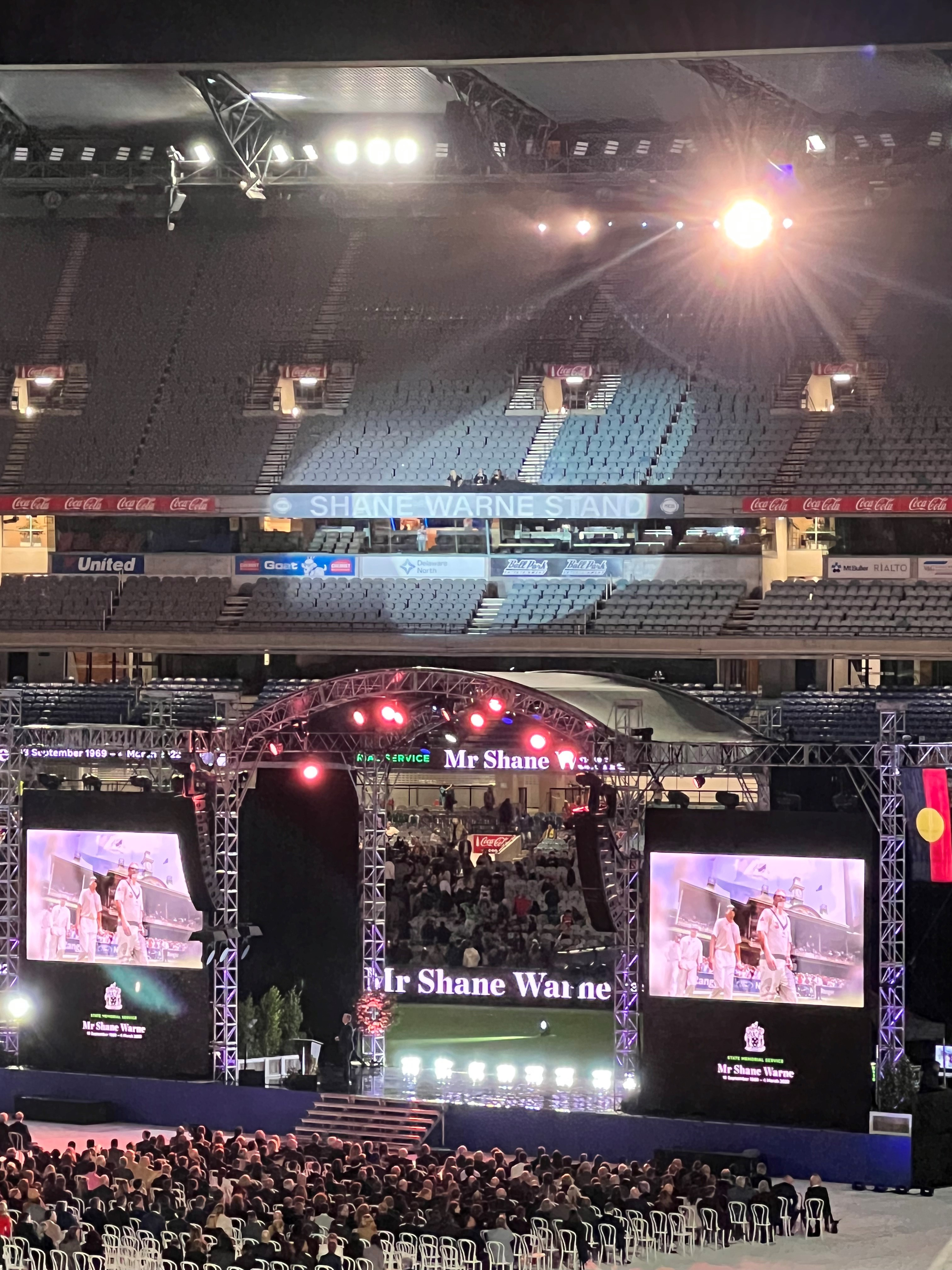
Warne's children unveiling the sign at the end of the service

It was earlier decided the Great Southern Stand at MCG was to be renamed in Warne's honour. To conclude the memorial, Warne's children unveiled the Shane Warne Stand sign with a recording of Frank Sinatra singing "My Way" playing in the background as the crowd rose and cheered. The service was produced by Warne’s management team, including Andrew Neophitou and Gareth Edwards.
