= Ladies & Gentlemen: The Songs of George Michael =

Live album by Anthony Callea
- Released: 1 August 2014
- Recorded: 16 May 2014
- Venue: The Palms at Crown
- Genre: Pop; pop rock; acoustic
- Label: ABC
- Producer: Toby Chadd, Jon Olb

Anthony Callea chronology
This Is Christmas (2013)	Ladies & Gentlemen: The Songs of George Michael (2014)	Backbone (2016)

Ladies & Gentlemen: The Songs of George Michael is the only live album by Australian musical artist, Anthony Callea. The album serves as a tribute to the songs of George Michael; the title refers to Michael's 1998 greatest hits collection, Ladies & Gentlemen: The Best of George Michael. It was recorded and filmed live with a 9 piece band at The Palms at Crown in Melbourne on 16 May 2014.

The concert saw Callea perform with a number of artists, including a duet with Casey Donovan, whose appearance on stage to sing "I Knew You Were Waiting (For Me)" became a crowd favourite and marked the first time the pair had sung together since the Australian Idol finale in 2004.

== Background and release ==
In 2013, Callea released the albums Thirty and This Is Christmas, performed in the hit musical Grease and sold his house. He then decided the time was right to take a risk and stage the show that would become Ladies and Gentlemen: The Songs of George Michael 30 years after the release of "Careless Whisper", Michael's first solo single away from Wham!. Originally intended to be a one-off show, the show sold out quickly and his record label, ABC Music, wanted to record and release it, to which Callea agreed.

Callea extended the life of the "one-off" show with not only a theatre performance in each capital city but also a screening of the concert DVD on Foxtel in September as part of the "Anthony Callea Presents: Music Legends" series.

Anthony said, "Like many of us, the music of George Michael has influenced me from a young age. As a singer, his vocal ability is undoubtedly one of a kind. The fact that his music catalogue is full of memorable hits that the audience absolutely embraced and loved on the night makes it even more exciting to now hit more stages around the country and celebrate one of the finest musicians of our time".

Callea lists his top five George Michael songs as; "Patience", "Amazing", "As", "Fastlove" and "Careless Whisper".

== Track listing ==
CD

1. "Amazing"
2. "Father Figure"
3. "Patience"
4. "Fastlove"
5. "I Can't Make You Love Me"
6. "Jesus to a Child"
7. "Kissing a Fool" (featuring John Foreman)
8. "I Knew You Were Waiting (For Me)" (featuring Casey Donovan)
9. "Freedom"
10. "Too Funky"
11. "One More Try"
12. "Faith" (featuring Tim Campbell)
13. "Somebody to Love" (featuring Tim Campbell)
14. "As" (featuring Susie Ahern)
15. "Careless Whisper"
16. "Wake Me Up Before You Go Go"

DVD

1. "Amazing"
2. "Father Figure"
3. "Patience"
4. "Fastlove"
5. "Jesus to a Child"
6. "Kissing a Fool" (featuring John Foreman)
7. "I Knew You Were Waiting (For Me)" (featuring Casey Donovan)
8. "Freedom"
9. "Too Funky"
10. "One More Try"
11. "Faith" (featuring Tim Campbell)
12. "Somebody to Love" (featuring Tim Campbell)
13. "As" (featuring Susie Ahern)
14. "Careless Whisper"
15. "I'm Your Man"
16. "Wake Me Up Before You Go Go"

== Personnel ==
- Anthony Callea - vocals

Additional musicians

- Annette Roach - backing vocals
- Susie Ahern - backing vocals
- Kim May - bass
- Stuart Fraser - guitar
- Colin Snape - keyboard
- Paul Cecchinelli - keyboard, piano
- Tim Wilson - saxophone
- Carmo Perutzzi - drums

== Charts ==
The DVD/CD debuted at No. 1 on the Australian Top 40 Music DVD Chart for the week commencing 11 August 2014.

=== Weekly charts ===
Chart (2014)	Peak position
Australian Music DVDs (ARIA)	1

=== Year-end charts ===
Chart (2014)	Position
Australian Audiovisual (ARIA)	47

== Tour ==
Date	Location	Venue
One-off show
16 May 2014	Melbourne	The Palms at Crown
Additional dates for "The Ladies and Gentlemen" concert
19 September 2014	Perth	Astor Theatre
20 September 2014	Adelaide	Her Majesty's Theatre
3 October 2014	Sydney	Enmore Theatre
4 October 2014	Melbourne	The Palms at Crown
11 October 2014	Brisbane	Convention Centre
