= Charles Mayer (actor) =

English actor

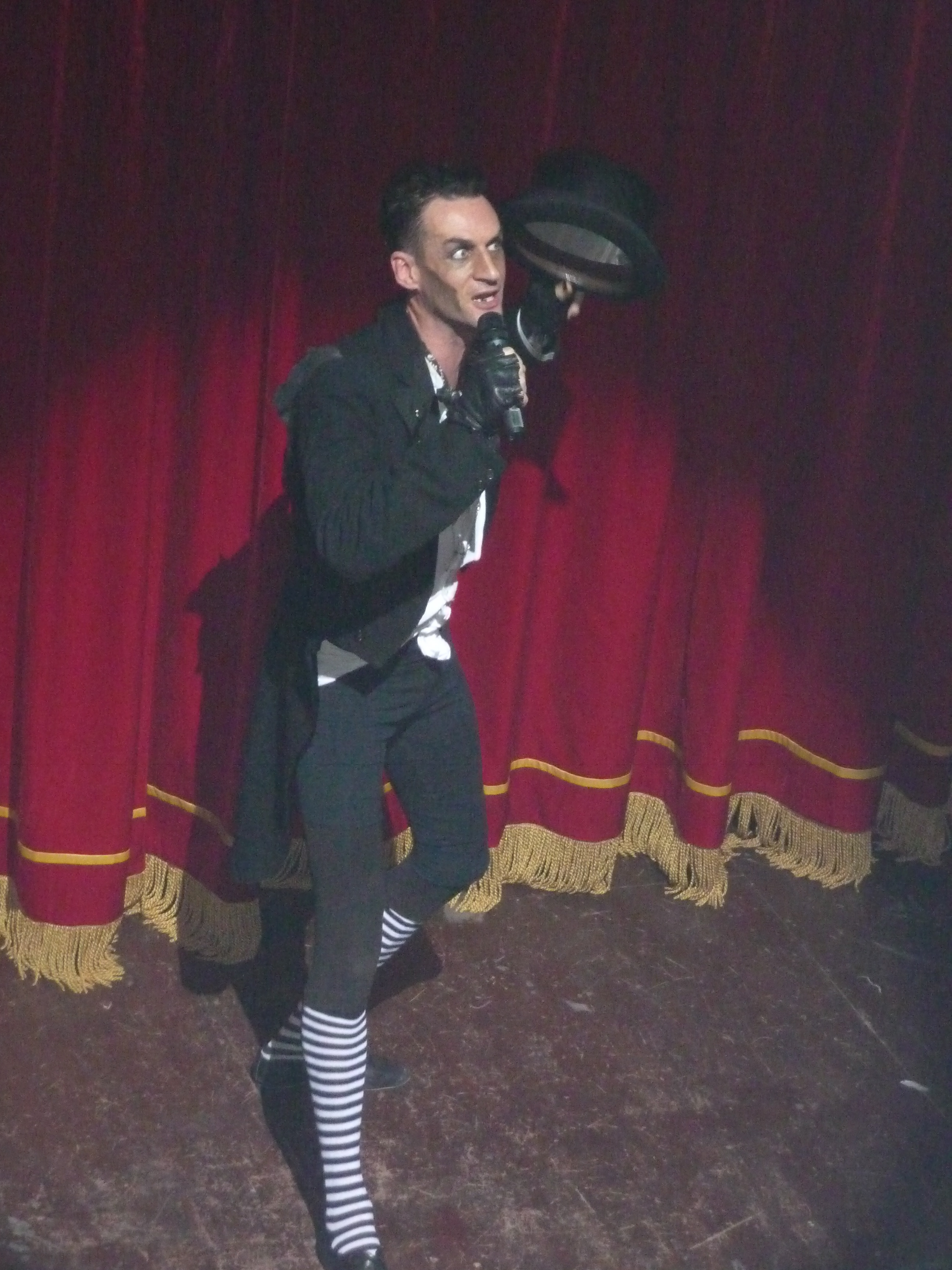
- Charles Mayer as "Chinatown Charlie" in 2009
- Born: Charles Anthony Martin Mayer; Tidworth, Hampshire, England
- Occupation: Actor
- Years active: 2002–present

Charles Anthony Martin Mayer is an English actor. He has been living and working in Australia since 2012.

== Early life and education ==
Charles Anthony Martin Mayer was born in South Tidworth, Hampshire, England. In 1992 he entered Royal Military Academy Sandhurst, from where he was commissioned into the Welsh Guards. He spent four years as an officer in Northern Ireland, two years as an instructor at the Infantry Training Centre in Catterick, two years on ceremonial duties in London, and a further two years in Tidworth.

After completing ten years of service, Mayer left the army, decided to become an actor, and entered the Guildhall School of Music & Drama in 2002.

== Film ==
Mayer appeared in Kojo Productions' The Pack (2015), directed by Nick Robinson, and in 2017 Luke Shanahan's Rabbit.

In writer/director Daniel Hsia's feature film Shanghai Calling (2012), Mayer plays the supporting role of Jensen.

In Mandarin Films' Ip Man 2 (2010), Mayer plays the villain opposite Sammo Hung.

In Greys Inbetween, a romantic tragedy written, directed, and produced by Andrew Rajan, Mayer plays the villain, the philandering husband who breaks his girlfriend's heart.

In The Ultimate Truth, a comedy written and directed by Nick Clarke with Wysiwyg Films, he plays a confused meglomaniac gangster turned politician with a sweet moll. It premiered at the Curzon Soho, London in 2003.

Mayer has a major role in a feature Ghosts of Old Shanghai (2011), an independent film written and directed by Eric Heise.

For short film, Mayer played a leading role in Analysis and in Goodbye Shanghai directed by Adam Christian Clark, has written and directed Against All Odds for the Meiwenti Shanghai Short Film Competition 2009, and produced and acted in China White Night for the 2009 Straight8 Film Competition. He has acted in many others.

== Television ==
After drama school Mayer made brief appearances in BBC One's prime time series Spooks and Hotel Babylon, and more recently in Piers Morgan On... Shanghai as the MC at Chinatown.

Through 2011 and 2012 he was host of International Channel Shanghai's daily culture programme City Beat.

In 2012 Mayer moved to Australia.

He appears in the Australian television series ANZAC Girls, Deadline Gallipoli, Gallipoli, Wastelander Panda and Pine Gap.

== Theatre ==
In London in 2006 he appeared in the West End in Martin Sherman's Bent, with Alan Cumming. The revival was directed by Daniel Kramer, under whom he has enjoyed several exploratory workshops. In Shanghai he worked with various professional theatre companies, appearing in Yazmena Reza's Art, I Am My Own Wife, No Exit, Oleanna and The Odd Couple.

In Australia, Mayer has appeared at the Adelaide Fringe in I Am My Own Wife and The Last Time I Saw Richard by Cat Commander; at State Theatre Company of South Australia's Othello, The Popular Mechanicals, and The 39 Steps; with Bluefruit Theatre in Dennis Kelly's Orphans; and at The Fitz, Sydney, in Anatomy of a Suicide. In New Zealand, he performed at Pop Up Globe in The Taming of The Shrew and Richard the Third.
