= Forty Love =

Studio album by Anthony Callea
- Released: 21 October 2022
- Genre: Pop
- Label: Vox Enterprises
- Producer: Liam Quinn

Anthony Callea chronology
ARIA Number 1 Hits in Symphony (2017)	Forty Love (2022)

Singles from Forty Love
- 1. "Heaven" Released: 30 September 2022; 2. "Only One" Released: 21 October 2022

Forty Love is the seventh studio album from Australian pop singer Anthony Callea.It was released on 21 October 2022 and peaked at number 5 on the ARIA Charts.

Upon announcement, Callea said "This album celebrates my 40 years in this life, yeah I can't believe it either! It feels like nothing else I have ever released, it's entirely me expressed through music which I am so proud of. It celebrates and appreciates the love and happiness I am fortunate to have, whilst also taking stock of the unpredictability and highs and lows of life. It is my DNA carved and molded into music and lyrics and I truly hope it resonates with people for its stories and its pop melodies as we all navigate this thing called life!"

== Track listing ==
No.	Title	Writer(s)	Length
1.	"Only One"	Anthony Callea, Ross Fraser	3:24
2.	"I Can't Trust Myself"	Callea, Sam Telford	3:28
3.	"Our New Love"	Callea, Andrew Lowden	3:56
4.	"After All This Time"	Callea, Antonio Galbiati	3:36
5.	"Heaven"	Callea, Matt Morris, Kevin Randolph	3:12
6.	"Incomplete"	Callea, John Farnham	4:38
7.	"Not to Love You"	Callea, Peter Amato, Eric Dill	3:51
8.	"Find Our Way"	Callea, Fraser	3:17
9.	"Stay"	Callea, Jaakko Salovaara	3:44
10.	"What It Feels Like"	Callea, Matthew Gerrard	3:44
11.	"I Won't Be Defeated"	Callea, Graham Stack, Tim Woodcock	4:01
12.	"The Prayer" (acoustic and reimagined)	David Foster, Carole Bayer Sager, Alberto Testa, Tony Renis	4:22

== Charts ==
Chart performance for Forty Love
Chart (2022)	Peak position
Australian Albums (ARIA)	5
