= High School Disco =

Studio album by Tim Campbell
- Released: 4 April 2014
- Genre: Pop, pop rock
- Length: 52:56
- Label: ABC Music / Universal Music Australia

Tim Campbell chronology
High School Disco (2014)	Electrifying 80s (2018)

High School Disco is the debut studio album by Australian actor/singer Tim Campbell. The album is a covers album of classic hits from the 1960s, '70s and '80s. It was released by Universal Music Australia in April 2014. It peaked at number 25 on the ARIA Charts.

Upon release Campbell said "I feel as if this album was in my blood from about 8 years of age. I have lived through and loved this era of music, and it continues to excite me today. Our high school discos were always a memorable night, with classic melodies and music that had my friends and I on the dance floor all night."

A music video for "Play That Funky Music" was released on 8 April 2014. Campbell toured the album across Australia throughout June and July 2014.

== Track listing ==
No.	Title	Writer(s)	Length
1.	"Play That Funky Music" (Wild Cherry)	Rob Parissi	4:50
2.	"Shake Your Groove Thing" (Peaches & Herb song)	Dino Fekaris; Freddie Perren	4:00
3.	"What I Like About You / R.O.C.K. in the U.S.A." (The Romantics / John Mellencamp song)	Wally Palmar; Mike Skill; Jimmy Marinos; John Mellencamp	4:17
4.	"Don't You (Forget About Me)" (Simple Minds song)	Keith Forsey; Steve Schiff	4:29
5.	"Holiday" (Madonna song)	Curtis Hudson; Lisa Stevens	4:12
6.	"Centerfold" (The J. Geils Band song)	Seth Justman	3:38
7.	"I'm a Believer" (The Monkees song)	Neil Diamond	3:07
8.	"Shout!" (The Isley Brothers song)	O'Kelly Isley, Jr.; Rudolph Isley; Ronald Isley	3:39
9.	"That's the Way (I Like It)" (KC and the Sunshine Band song)	Harry W. Casey; Richard Finch	3:32
10.	"It Must Have Been Love" (Roxette song)	Per Gessle	4:07
11.	"Can You Feel It (featuring Susie Ahern) " (The Jacksons song)	Michael Jackson; Jackie Jackson	3:27
12.	"My Sharona" (The Knack song)	Doug Fieger; Berton Averre	3:33
13.	"Footloose" (Kenny Loggins song)	Kenny Loggins; Dean Pitchford	3:48
14.	"Faith" (George Michael song)	George Michael	2:23

== Tour ==
Campbell toured the album with 9 dates across Australia.

- June 12 : Adelaide (Festival Theatre)
- June 13 : Adelaide (Festival Theatre)
- June 20 : Bankstown (Bankstown Sports Club)
- June 21 : Canberra (Southern Cross Club)
- June 27 : Launceston (Country Club)
- June 28 : Hobart (Wrest Point Showroom)
- July 11 : Brisbane (Kedron Wavell)
- July 12 : Tweed Heads (Twin Towns)
- July 26 : Melbourne (Palms At Crown)

== Charts ==
Chart (2014)	Peak position
Australian Albums (ARIA)	25

== Release history ==
Region	Date	Format	Label	Catalogue
Australia	4 April 2014	Digital download, CD	ABC Music / Universal Music Australia	3773535
