= Backbone (Anthony Callea album) =

Studio album by Anthony Callea
- Released: 16 September 2016
- Recorded: June–July 2016
- Studios: Sing Sing Studios, Melbourne
- Genre: Pop
- Length: 61:35
- Label: Sony Music Australia
- Producer: James Roche

Anthony Callea chronology
Ladies & Gentlemen: The Songs of George Michael (2014)	Backbone (2016)	ARIA Number 1 Hits in Symphony (2017)

Backbone is the fifth studio album by Australian pop singer Anthony Callea. The album is produced by James Roche of Bachelor Girl and was released on 16 September 2016. It reunites Callea with Sony Music with whom he signed in 2004 and released two studio albums and two number 1 multi-platinum-selling singles. Callea said, "I'm so fortunate that Denis Handlin and Sony Music have embraced my idea of Backbone and allowed me to make this exciting album with them."

Upon announcement of the album, Callea said "With Backbone, we have explored songs that we all know and love – and we've been able to get to the core of these songs, their lyrics and melody, bringing them to the surface with organic and creative musical instrumentation and vocal delivery." He added, "I wrote the title track when I was in Los Angeles, and it sums up the essence of this album."

== Reception ==
Myke Bartlett from The Weekly Review said, "If the choices are a tad obvious, the renditions aren’t. In stripping some songs back and slowing others down, Anthony finds something new in the well-worn." A staff writer in Out in Perth gave the album 4 out of 5 saying, "A friendly sing-a-long with an acoustic guitar and piano. Kicking things off with Michael Jackson’s "Man in the Mirror", which is much more laid back than the original. Callea tackles Queen’s "Somebody to Love" acapella which showcases his vocal abilities. A ballad version of Bananarama’s "Love in the First Degree" is a highlight, while a gender swap take on TLCs "Unpretty" is nice too."

== Track listing ==
Tracks on Backbone are "stripped back" renditions of 80s and 90s tracks.

No.	Title	Writer(s)	Length
1.	"Man in the Mirror" (Michael Jackson song)	Siedah Garrett; Glen Ballard	4:51
2.	"Hold On" (Wilson Phillips song)	Chynna Phillips; Glen Ballard; Carnie Wilson	4:02
3.	"We Belong" (Pat Benatar song)	David Eric Lowen; Dan Navarro	4:51
4.	"Higher Love" (Steve Winwood song)	Steve Winwood; Will Jennings	4:44
5.	"Sometimes" (Britney Spears song)	Jörgen Elofsson	4:54
6.	"I Wanna Dance with Somebody/How Will I Know" (Whitney Houston songs)	George Merrill; Shannon Rubicam; Narada Michael Walden	6:28
7.	"Love in the First Degree" (Bananarama song)	Matt Aitken; Sara Dallin; Siobhan Fahey; Mike Stock; Pete Waterman; Keren Woodward	4:13
8.	"Somebody to Love" (Queen song)	Freddie Mercury	4:06
9.	"It's All Coming Back to Me Now" (Céline Dion/Meat Loaf & Marion Raven song)	Jim Steinman	6:54
10.	"King of Wishful Thinking" (Go West song)	Peter Cox; Richard Drummie; Martin Page	3:25
11.	"Fantasy" (Earth, Wind & Fire/Black Box song)	Maurice White; Verdine White; Eddie del Barrio	5:11
12.	"Unpretty" (TLC song)	Dallas Austin; Tionne Watkins	4:36
13.	"Backbone" (original song)	Anthony Callea; Damon Sharpe; Christopher McDonald	3:20

== Tour ==
Callea promoted the album with a 5-date tour.

- September 2: Tweed Heads (Twin Towns)
- September 3: Mount Pritchard (Mounties)
- September 23: Revesby (Revesby Workers Club)
- September 24: Campbelltown (The Cube)
- September 30: Melbourne (The Palms at Crown)

== Charts ==
Backbone debuted at number one in Australia. It was Callea's second number one album and first since his 2005 self-titled debut album. Backbone sold 2949 in the first week, becoming the lowest selling number one debut of all time in Australia.

Chart (2016)	Peak position
Australian Albums (ARIA)	1

== Personnel ==
- Adam Rhodes - Engineer
- Matt Neighbour - Engineer
- Carlo Parisi - Drums
- James Richmond - Percussion
- James Roach - Piano
- Mark Amato - Piano
- Isaac Moran - Guitar
- Craig Newman - Double bass/ Electric bass
- Kellie Santin - Saxophone
- Suzanna Ling - Violin
- Ruby Paskas - Violin
- Natasha Conrau - Violin
- Katie Yap - Viola
- Charlotte Jacke - Cello / String Captain
- Susie Ahern - Backing vocals
- Annette Roche - Backing vocals
- Rocky Loprevitte - Backing vocals

== Release history ==
Region	Date	Format	Label	Catalogue
Australia	16 September 2016	CD, digital download	Sony Music Australia	88985371212

== See also ==
- List of number-one albums of 2016 (Australia)
