= Ed Halmagyi =

Australian chef and television presenter

- Born: 27 February 1975 (age 51); Melbourne, Victoria, Australia
- Occupations: Chef; TV presenter; author; photographer; radio host
- Television: Better Homes and Gardens; Discover Tasmania
- Spouse: Leah Halmagyi
- Children: 2
- Website: www.fast-ed.com.au

Ed Halmagyi (born February 1975), known as "Fast Ed", is an Australian TV presenter, chef, author, photographer, and radio host.

== Early life ==
Halmagyi was born in February 1975, in Melbourne, Victoria, Australia, to Hungarian-Jewish immigrants: neurologist Gabor Michael Halmagyi AO and bush regenerator Sue Halmagyi OAM. He has an older sister, Catherine, and a younger brother, Nicholas.

At 15, Halmagyi began his culinary career as a kitchen hand, then becoming an assistant chef. Throughout his school years at Trinity Grammar School, Halmagyi worked in Sydney restaurants, then undertook a Bachelor of Arts/Law at Sydney University. He continued to work as a chef alongside his studies. In 1995, he travelled to the Solomon Islands to participate in a program of community development and aid work.

Subsequently, Halmagyi pursued a Bachelor of Business degree through Southern Cross University (not yet completed) and qualified as a beekeeper.

== Career ==
Halmagyi is best known for his role on the Seven Network lifestyle show Better Homes and Gardens, on which he became a cast member in 2004, as well as contributing to the eponymous monthly magazine. In November 2023, Halmagyi announced he was leaving the series, with his final episode airing on 1 December 2023.

For three seasons, he was the host of the travel show Discover Tasmania, as well as hosting his own afternoon cooking show, Fast Ed's Fast Food.

Halmagyi has published five cookbooks – Nove Cucina (2004), Dinner in 10 (2009), An Hour's the Limit (2010), The Food Clock: A Year of Eating Seasonally (2012) and The Everyday Kitchen (2017).

He has written a weekly syndicated column for the NewsLocal network of newspapers, produced his own magazine called Better Basics, and contributes to other magazines in Australia and abroad. Halmagyi is a successful commercial photographer, running a food and product media business in Sydney that specialises in editorial imagery and commercial product work. Halmagyi has worked as a brand ambassador for Mitsubishi Electric and Ingham’s, among other brands. He is the ambassador for "A Taste of Harmony", an annual event that gives Australian workplaces the opportunity to celebrate their cultural diversity.

As a chef and pastry chef, Halmagyi's resume includes stints at Rockpool and Bennelong in Sydney, as well as Cruise, Beach Road, and Nove Cucina. His favourite job was working at the Wickaninnish Inn in Tofino, Canada.

Halmagyi ran a Jewish bakery, Avner's Bakery, in Surry Hills, Sydney. In the aftermath of the Bondi Beach shooting in December 2025, Halmagyi closed the bakery.

== Media ==
He has been a regular guest on ABC Radio Sydney, and has co-hosted the "Better Homes and Gardens" podcast.

== Personal life ==
He lives in the Sydney suburb of Bilgola Beach, with his wife Leah, a graphic designer, he has a daughter and a son. Over the last decade, Halmagyi has performed charitable work with organisations including the Dry July Foundation and the Cancer Council NSW.

== Sources ==
- Professional Website
- "Roughcut Studio • Food Photography and Test Kitchen". roughcutstudio.com.au.
- Biography at Random House Publishing
- "Discover Tasmania TV Blog". 29 October 2009. Archived from the original on 29 October 2009.
- "Fast Ed Halmagyi". Yahoo Life. 29 November 2007.
