= Discover Tasmania =

- Presented by: Ed Halmagyi; Tim Campbell (season 1); Jack Campbell (season 2–present)
- Country of origin: Australia
- No. of seasons: 2

Production
- Running time: Approx 30 minutes (including commercials)

Original release
- Network: Seven Network
- Release: October 2007 – present

Discover Tasmania is an Australian lifestyle television series that airs on the Seven Network.

Originally broadcast from October to December 2007 in Tasmania only, it won all but one of its timeslots, with each episode receiving around 75,000 Tasmanian viewers. After its success there, and a push from the Tasmanian government, the show has since been shown across mainland Australia. In NSW, season one episodes averaged 218,000 viewers.

The first season was hosted by 'Fast Ed' (Better Homes and Gardens) and Tim Campbell (Home and Away).

The program was renewed for a second season which began airing nationally on 20 March 2010 on Saturday afternoons. Fast Ed returned, joined by Jack Campbell (All Saints) as new co-host, following Tim's move to the Nine Network.

Past episodes are also shown on 7two and available to watch online from the official website.
