= Jack Campbell (actor) =

Australian actor (born 1970)

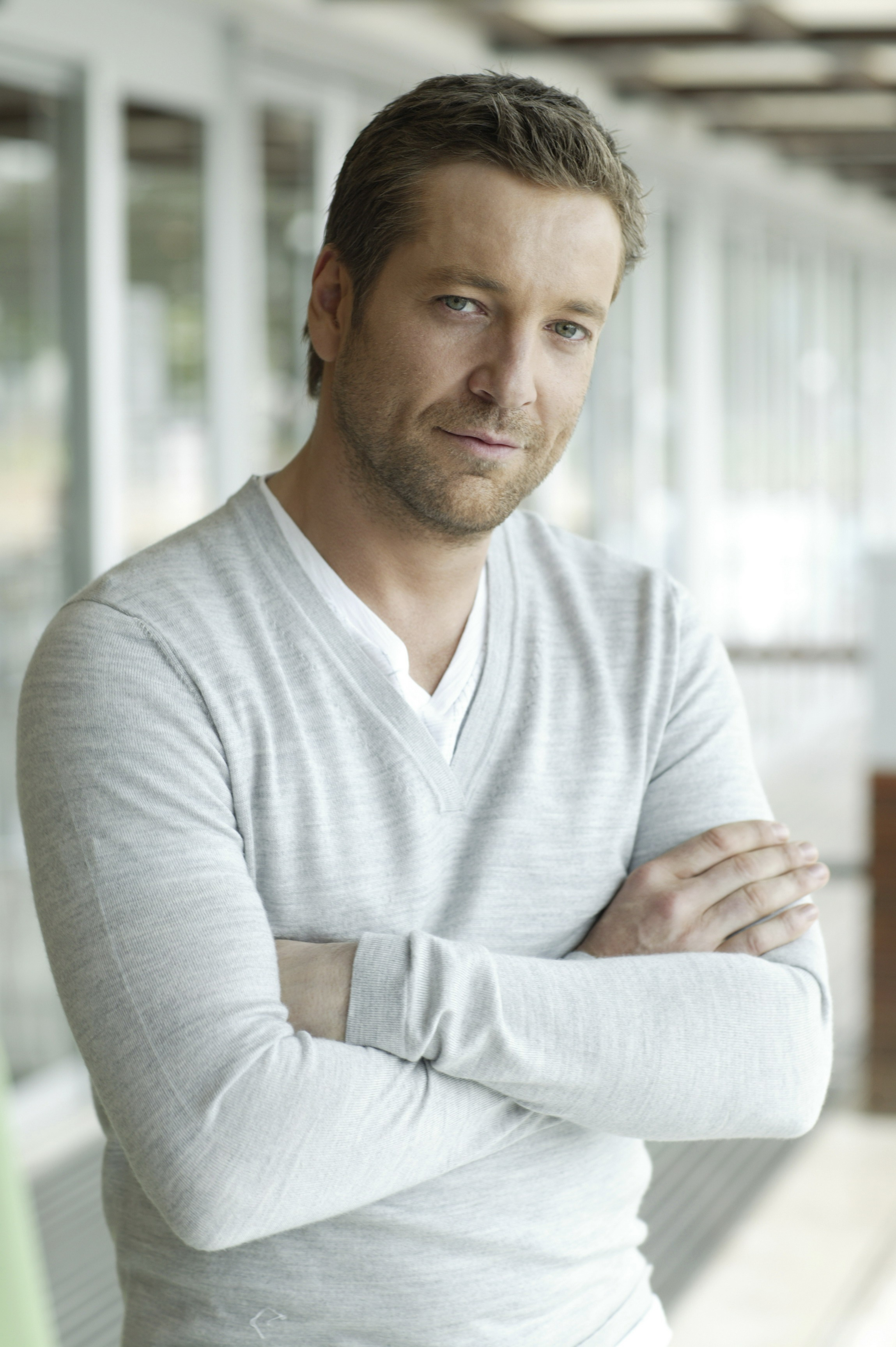
- Born: 2 November 1970 (age 55); Sydney, New South Wales, Australia
- Occupation: Actor
- Years active: 1990 – present

Jack Campbell (born 2 November 1970) is an Australian actor. He is best known for his role of Dr. Steve Taylor in the Australian medical drama All Saints on Network Seven and his portrayal of infamous gangster "Big Jim" Devine in the Nine Network drama series Underbelly: Razor, based on the criminal underworld of Sydney in the 1920s.

== Early life ==
Jack Campbell was born to farmers and graziers, Bruce and Ilma Campbell on 2 November 1970 in Sydney, Australia. The youngest of three boys, Campbell was raised on a wheat and cattle farm in the Australian Outback (Warrumbungles, N.S.W.) He attended Tudor House in Moss Vale for four years before heading to The King's School.

== Career ==
In 1990, Campbell moved to Sydney, where he pursued acting at The Actors Center in Surry Hills. Campbell soon appeared in several Australian television shows, before performing with the Sydney Theatre Company in Six Degrees of Separation. He then co-starred in the feature film, The Nostradamus Kid, alongside Noah Taylor and Miranda Otto.

From 1996 to 1998, Campbell had a leading role in the New Zealand drama series, City Life playing the Prime Minister's rebellious son, Aaron Kellett. After this, he starred in the successful New Zealand medical drama, Shortland Street as romantic lead, Dr. Daniel Buchanan (1998–2000). Campbell also appeared in New Zealand dramas, Jackson's Wharf and The Legend of William Tell, before travelling to New York where he studied at The Cay Michael Patten Acting Studio.

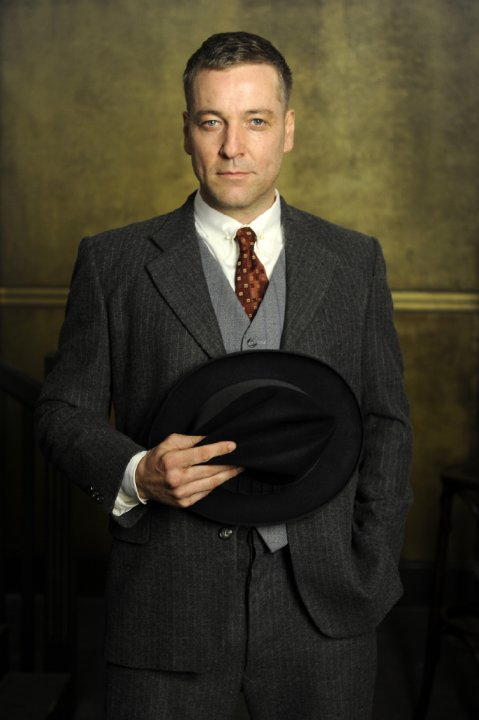
Jack Campbell

In 2003 Campbell returned to Australia where he created and hosted a popular internet radio show called "A Positive Spin". The radio show was a labor of love, sponsored by "The Salvation Army", it incorporated cognitive behavioral therapy, philosophy, humor, music and live studio interviews, and was designed to teach people, specifically Sydney's Inner City street kids, how to turn negatives into positives.

In 2006, Campbell starred in the first three episodes of the BBC/Nine Network co-production of Maddigan's Quest, a young adult - post apocalyptic drama series. This was followed by the feature film, Gabriel where he played Archangel Raphael. After this, Campbell starred in the BBC/ABC Co-Production of Catalpa Rescue, playing Captain Anthony.

In 2007–2009, Campbell played Dr. Steve Taylor in Australia's number one medical drama, All Saints on the Seven Network. During this time at the request of Tourism Tasmania, Campbell hosted Discover Tasmania, a lifestyle program that also aired on the Seven Network. Campbell then joined soap opera, Home and Away as Michael Patton, before guest starring in the Australian TV drama, Sea Patrol playing troubled mercenary, Garth Davidson.

In 2011 Campbell appeared in the feature film, Burning Man, before starring as Sydney's infamous 1920s gangster, Jim Devine in Australia's highest rating television drama series, Underbelly: Razor for the Nine Network.

In 2014 Campbell starred as hardened farmer and devoted family man, Adam Wilson in the feature film, The Pack. This thriller made its world premiere at the 2015 Fantasy Filmfest and later secured United States distribution on Netflix in 2016.

In 2015 Campbell starred as author and widowed father, Alex Gibbs in the feature film, Without a Body which co-stars Kevin Sorbo, Michael Welch, Rena Owen and Isabella Kai Rice.

In 2017 Campbell appeared for the Nine Network in the mini-series House of Bond playing America's Cup skipper John Bertrand. Campbell also starred alongside Lee Byung-hun and Gong Hyo-jin in the dramatic South Korean feature film A Single Rider which was released by Warner Bros in 2017.

In 2018 Campbell starred in a weird western film called Aurora about the first recorded UFO crash in American history. Then in 2019 Campbell played a private detective in an Australian film noir titled The Case of the Shanghaied Songbird. It premiered at the Křivoklát Castle north of Prague in 2019. Campbell then appeared in the feature film The American King which was released in the U.S. in 2020. And most recently Campbell starred in the feature film Risen which was released in the U.S. in 2021.

Campbell was nominated for Best Supporting Actor at the 1994 Australian Film Critic's Awards. He was nominated for his role of MacAlister in the feature film, The Nostradamus Kid. Campbell was also nominated for Most Popular New Male Talent at the Australian 2008 Logie Awards. He was nominated for his role of Dr. Steve Taylor in the award-winning television medical drama, All Saints. Campbell was also nominated for Best Actor at the 2021 Toronto Beach Film Festival in Canada. He was nominated for his performance in the feature film Risen. And most recently Campbell won Best Actor at the 2021 Macabre Faire Film Festival in Long Beach New York, for his standout performance in the feature film Choir Girl.

== Filmography ==
=== Film ===
Year	Title	Role	Notes
1993	The Nostradamus Kid	McAlister	
2001	The Money Shot	Jason Speers	Short
2007	Devil's Gateway	Derek Rant	
2007	The Catalpa Rescue	Captain Anthony	
2007	Gabriel	Raphael	
2010	Venus Man Trap	Jim	Short
2010	The Burnt Cork	Matthew	Short
2011	Burning Man	Ian	
2011	Liv	Mitch	Short
2015	The Pack	Adam Wilson	
2017	A Single Rider	Kris	
2017	Asomatous	Alex Gibbs	
2018	Along the Bed's Edge Sitting	Mr. Siskin	Short
2019	The American King- As told by an African Priestess	Vladimir	
2019	Choir Girl	Daddy	Feature, completed
2019	The Case of the Shanghaied Songbird	Frank Drennan	Short, completed
20??	Mafia	Vladimir Cheniy	Short, completed

=== Television ===
Year	Title	Role	Notes
1990	A Country Practice	Red	"The Golden Fleece: Part 1"
1992	Police Rescue	Mark Orland	"Sugar"
1996–98	City Life	Aaron Kellett	Main role
1998	The Legend of William Tell	Alexim	"Darkness and Light"
1998–99	Shortland Street	Dr. Daniel Buchanan	Regular role
2001	Shortland Street	Dr. Daniel Buchanan	Regular role
2006	Maddigan's Quest	Ferdy	"Road Rats", "Greentown", "Pilgrim's Vantage"
2007–2009	All Saints	Dr. Steven Taylor	Main role
2010	Home and Away	Michael Patton	Recurring role
2010	Discover Tasmania	Himself	Host
2011	Sea Patrol	Garth Davidson	"Saving Ryan"
2011	Underbelly: Razor	Jim Devine	Main role
2017	House of Bond	John Bertrand	TV miniseries
2023	Wellmania	Branson	1 episode
2024	Last Days of the Space Age	Brian	1 episode

Preceded by Tim Campbell	Discover Tasmania co-presenter (with Ed Halmagyi); 2010	Succeeded by incumbent
