= Last to Go =

EP by Anthony Callea
- Released: 21 February 2012
- Recorded: Melbourne
- Genres: Pop, dance-pop
- Length: 26:10
- Label: Vox Enterprises

Anthony Callea chronology
A New Chapter (2006)	Last to Go (2012)	Thirty (2013)

Singles from Last To Go
- 1. "Oh Oh, Oh Oh" Released: 7 October 2011; 2. "Last to Go" Released: 21 February 2012

Last to Go is the first extended play by Australian recording artist Anthony Callea. Callea worked with Aussie producers David Musumeci, Michael D'Arcy from DNA Songs on the seven-track EP, as well as Jamie Munson (a.k.a. DJ Poet) from the Black Eyed Peas.

== Background ==
Callea had been signed with Sony Music Australia after finishing runner-up to Casey Donovan on the second series of Australian Idol in 2004. The contract ceased in 2009. Over the next three years, Callea worked on new music independently and self-funded his own production company called "Vox Enterprises".

In July 2011, it was announced that Callea would preview long-awaited new material at the 2011 Stockholm Pride Festival. Callea wrote with various people including Paul Mac and the Black Eyed Peas producer DJ Poet. Callea said he had spent the past three years crafting a new musical direction after beginning his career as a popera star with the fastest-selling Australian single ever, "The Prayer". Callea said, "It's been really interesting working with people overseas who had no idea who I was or where I come from."

On the change of musical direction, in October 2011 Callea said; "I still love ballads and pop, but this is what I'm enjoying now. If I don't do music I love, I can't expect anyone else to believe it."

== Promotion ==
Callea promoted the single "Oh Oh, Oh Oh" in October 2011, and the EP Last to Go in March and April 2012.

On 17 October 2011, Callea performed an acoustic version of "Oh Oh, Oh Oh" live on The Circle. On 4 March 2012, Callea performed "Last to Go" live on Sunrise. In April 2012, Callea also performed "Last to Go" live on Young Talent Time.

Live performances

Date	Location	Venue
2 October 2011	Sydney	Home Nightclub
5 November 2011	Melbourne	Crown Entertainment Complex
9 March 2012	Melbourne	Greyhound Nightclub
17 March 2012	Sydney	ARC Nightclub
18 March 2012	Los Angeles	Here Nightclub
19 March 2012	Los Angeles	Eleven Nightclub

Callea continued to perform throughout the U.S. and took his energetic performance style to Los Angeles and Las Vegas where he performed to packed houses in West Hollywood and the famous Planet Hollywood on the Vegas strip.

== Reception ==
Yahoo 7 said, "From the carefree celebration of 'Last to Go' to the emotional depth of 'Tangled', the EP is a compelling collection of songs. 'Last Night' is the ultimate party anthem, while the strikingly honest 'I Don't Care What You Say' is the sound of defiance and independence."

ARIA said, "Anthony's growth and evolution as a music artist and entertainer will no doubt continue to inspire in this next phase whilst always demonstrating his determination and incredibly faultless vocal talent."

Howard from Rickey said. "...[there is] a strong bond between the artist and the music. The versatility of his voice is remarkable, being able to sing whatever is asked of him." He said Callea is getting "better and better."

Nick Bond of Star Observer said; "'Last to Go', the title track of this newly released EP.., [is] easily the best song the pocket rocket's ever put his name to." He continued saying, "Elsewhere on this seven-song EP, Callea goes into ballad mode on 'Tangled', offers up another slice of camp dance pop with 'Last Night', collaborates with Paul Mac on the ace gay anthem 'I Don't Care What You Say'."

The Live Guide said; "The 7 track EP is the sound of an artist who's embracing his creative freedom, excited by the endless possibilities."

== Track listing ==
No.	Title	Writer(s)	Producer(s)	Length
1.	"Last to Go"	Anthony Callea, David Musumeci & Anthony Egizii	DNA Songs	3:49
2.	"Oh Oh Oh Oh"	Callea & Jamie Munson	DJ Poet and Khaled	3:10
3.	"Tangled"	Callea, Matt Morris, Kadis & Sean	Michael D'Arcy	4:01
4.	"Last Night"	Callea & Jaakko Salovaara	D'Arcy	3:33
5.	"I Don't Care What You Say"	Callea, Paul Mac & Cindy Ryan	D'Arcy	3:55
6.	"Last to Go (Acoustic)"	Callea, Musumeci & Egizi	James Kempster	4:19
7.	"Oh Oh Oh Oh (Acoustic)"	Callea & Munson	Kempster	3:23
Total length:				26:10

== Singles ==
- "Oh Oh Oh Oh" was released on 7 October 2011 debuted at number 6 AIR Charts, and 111 on the ARIA charts.
- "Last to Go" was released on 21 February 2012. It peaked at number 266 on the ARIA Charts.

== Release history ==
Region	Date	Format	Label
Worldwide	21 February 2012	Digital download	Vox Enterprises
