= Electrifying 80s =

Studio album by Tim Campbell

Studio album by Tim Campbell
- Released: 27 July 2018
- Genre: Pop, pop rock
- Label: Encore Records / MGM

Tim Campbell chronology
High School Disco (2014)	Electrifying 80s (2018)

Electrifying 80s is the second studio album by Australian actor/singer Tim Campbell. The album is a covers album of classic hits by Stock Aitken Waterman. Upon release Campbell said "As a child of the '80s, I grew up to the sound of Stock Aitken and Waterman and they were a huge inspiration in creating these tracks."

The album was released on Campbell's own record label Encore Records in July 2018 and it peaked at number 15 on the ARIA Charts. A remix album titled Electrifying 80s - The Remixes was also released the same year, containing remixes of "You Spin Me Round (Like a Record)", "Never Gonna Give You Up", "Venus" and "You Think You're a Man". The album was produced and mixed by Paul Cecchinelli.

== Track listing ==
No.	Title	Writer(s)	Length
1.	"You Spin Me Round (Like a Record)" (Dead or Alive song)	Pete Burns; Steve Coy; Wayne Hussey; Tim Lever; Mike Percy	3:22
2.	"Never Gonna Give You Up" (Rick Astley song)	Matt Aitken; Mike Stock; Pete Waterman	3:31
3.	"This Time I Know It's for Real" ([featuring Natasha Stuart] Donna Summer song)	Donna Summer; Stock; Aitken; Waterman	3:11
4.	"I Want You Back" (Bananarama song)	Aitken; Sara Dallin; Siobhan Fahey; Stock; Waterman; Keren Woodward	4:16
5.	"Too Many Broken Hearts" (Jason Donovan song)	Stock; Aitken; Waterman	3:27
6.	"Especially for You" ([featuring Susie Goble] Kylie Minogue and Jason Donovan song)	Stock; Aitken; Waterman	4:04
7.	"You Think You're a Man" (Divine song)	Geoff Deane	4:05
8.	"Venus" (Bananarama song)	Robbie van Leeuwen	4:00
9.	"Respectable" ([featuring Susie Ahern] Mel and Kim song)	Stock; Aitken; Waterman	3:40
10.	"Hand on Your Heart" (Kylie Minogue song)	Stock; Aitken; Waterman	4:08

== Charts ==
Chart (2018)	Peak position
Australian Albums (ARIA)	15

== Release history ==
Region	Date	Format	Label	Catalogue
Australia	27 July 2018	Digital download, CD	Encore Records / MGM	ER001
