= The Pack (2015 film) =

- Theatrical release poster
- Directed by: Nick Robertson
- Written by: Evan Randall Green
- Produced by: Michael Robertson; Kent Smith
- Starring: Katie Moore; Anna Lise Phillips; Jack Campbell; Hamish Phillips
- Cinematography: Benjamin Shirley
- Edited by: Gabriella Muir
- Music by: Tom Schutzinger
- Production companies: Breakout Movies; Kojo; Lightning Entertainment; Prodigy Movies; Screen Australia
- Distributed by: IFC Midnight (United States); Kojo (Australia)
- Release date: 5 August 2015 (Fantasy Film Festival)
- Running time: 90 minutes
- Country: Australia
- Language: English

The Pack is a 2015 Australian natural horror film that was directed by Nick Robertson, based on a script by Evan Randall Green. The film had its world premiere on 5 August 2015 at the Fantasy Film Festival and centers on a young Australian family who are terrorized by a pack of wild dogs. Despite the title and story, the film is not a remake of the 1977 film of the same name.

It was filmed in South Australia, Queensland, New South Wales, and New Zealand.

== Plot ==
The film opens with a sitter hearing sounds and going out to his barn to investigate. A short time later, his wife awakens from her easy chair by the fireplace to see his cigarette burning in the ashtray, but he is not in the house. She goes to find him and hears a noise in the barn. As she enters the barn, she is killed by an unknown creature.

The next morning a neighboring sitter, Adam, finds several of his sheep dead after having their throats ripped out by a creature in the night. Meanwhile, his wife Carla is working in her veterinary clinic and hears the report of the dead sitters on the radio. She snaps off the radio and sends her son Henry out to play. The daughter Sophie is on the roof of the vet clinic, laying in a lounger and talking to her friend on the radio. Carla sits at her desk, picks up the overdue $435 radio bill and angrily calls her daughter, who ignores her. Sophie storms into the clinic and argues with her about school life being solitary confinement and how they should move into the city; Carla counters this by suggesting she help out around the house or get a job to help pay the radio bill. Carla sends the children in the house and calls for her friend over the walkie talkie.

The bank manager arrives and, during the course of the conversation, it is revealed that their payments are in arrears and the house is being foreclosed, despite Carla's clinic being a new source of income. The snide and sarcastic bank manager tells them they can take the reduced amount of $200,000 for their barn or be forced out in 48 hours, but Adam refuses to sell, as the only reason they are unprofitable is because the sheep keep being attacked and stating that they will never have to leave. The manager drives off and stops on the side of the road to urinate, but before he can return to his car, he is promptly attacked by a pack of wild dogs that viciously tear his flesh and drag him down the hill.

Later that night, the family is having a quiet evening. Sophie, who is in the shower, does not notice the shadow of a dog in the hall. When Carla and Henry go into the basement to change a fuse, she jump-scares him and teases him about being afraid. Adam goes outside to start the generator, when he realizes the family dog is missing. Calling for it, he walks to the edge of the forest and sees a few sets of yellow eyes staring back at him. He backs away from the forest as howling begins and large shadows start to pursue him, and rushes back into the house just ahead of the dogs who try to get into the house.

When he goes to get his rifle, he notices that there are only two bullets and questions Carla about it, who tells them that they have been going missing, although it was revealed earlier in the film to be Henry who is taking them. Carla calls the police and tells them there is a break-in, while Adam trains his rifle on the door and shoots through it, hitting the dog. He opens the door to see if it is dead and is attacked by it, and accidentally fires off his other round before dropping his rifle, which skids out the door. Carla grabs a weapon and begins to beat the dog. A police officer arrives at the house to investigate and attempts to radio in to the police precinct. He gets out of his vehicle and as he approaches the house, the pack viciously attacks him before dragging his body into the woods. Adam goes out to his pick-up truck and lets the family know it is safe to come out so they can escape in the truck. Just then, a dog leaps through his window, breaking the glass and biting him. He hits the gas and the truck leaps forward, plowing into the police car and totaling both vehicles.

Carla hides Sophie and Henry in the pantry, while an injured Adam goes out to the vet clinic to get additional ammo. Adam gets into the clinic and finds there are only a few shells left. He hears a noise in the other room and creeps over to find a wild dog eating the animals in cages. Sophie begins calling him over the walkie talkie, which alerts the dog to his presence and it attacks him; he fights it off with the rifle. Meanwhile, another wild dog is trying to get into the closet and attack the children, but Carla stabs it with a kitchen knife and it runs off. They make an alternate plan to climb up onto the roof of the vet clinic. Adam goes first to snipe the dogs, while the children stealthily go through the interior dog run. Henry stops to spread some liquid to distract wolves and to collect some unused rifle shells he has hidden there. Carla has been making firebombs from flammable liquid she had in the house to throw at the dogs, while the children run across the last patch of lawn to the ladder. The leader of the pack sees Carla and runs toward her. As she runs back for the house, she sees it closing in on her. She goes to the pick-up truck instead and climbs through the back window to get the tire iron and beat it. She fights it off long enough to get the truck door open. As it leaps through the window, she slams the door, closing the dog inside. She hides under the truck, but is soon dragged out by the dog. As she sits at the side of the truck with the crowbar still in hand, the lead dog approaches her slowly, snarling and showing his teeth. As he is about to attack, Adam appears on the back of the truck, and shoots the dog in the head, killing him instantly.

As day breaks, the dogs flee off into the woods and the bloodied exhausted parents lead the children back to the house and the family dog comes bounding out of nowhere to join them. The camera pans above the house and through the forest before a close-up of a dark cave entrance. A pair of yellow eyes, like the ones from earlier in the film, peer out from the darkness before the end credits begin.

== Cast ==
- Jack Campbell as Adam Wilson
- Anna Lise Phillips as Carla Wilson
- Katie Moore as Sophie Wilson
- Hamish Phillips as Henry Wilson
- Charles Mayer as Bank Manager
- Kieran Thomas McNamara as Police Officer (as Kieran Macnamara)
- Devon Amber as Sheep Farmer
- Dianna Buckland as Farmer's Wife
- Roger Newcombe as Radio Newsreader (voice)
- Janine Baigent as Police Phone Operator (voice)

== Release ==
The Pack was released on 5 August 2015 at the Fantasy International Film Festival in Germany and in Turkey on 13 November 2015. It received a limited release in the U.S. on 5 February 2016, as well as a Blu-ray and DVD release on the same date.

== Reception ==
Critical reception for The Pack was predominantly negative and the movie currently holds a rating of 50% on RottenTomatoes, based on eight reviews. LA Weekly panned the film, criticizing it for its storytelling and commenting that the movie's family was "remarkably stupid". The New York Times wrote a similar criticism of the family, while the Los Angeles Times felt that the movie relied overly much on "too many cheap jump-scares".

A reviewer for the New York Observer was more favorable, calling it "an effective thriller that sets out to scare the living daylights out of even the most skeptical viewer and delivers in spades." Mark Harris of About.com gave a mostly positive review, writing that "The attractiveness of the package and the steady pace at which it doles out the action more than make up for the character shortcomings in one of the best animals-run-amok horror movies in recent memory."
