= Live for Love =

Single by Anthony Callea

from the album A New Chapter
- Released: 3 November 2006
- Recorded: 2006
- Genre: Pop rock
- Length: 4:05
- Label: Sony BMG
- Songwriter(s): Gary Pinto, Paul Cechinelli
- Producer(s): Chong Lim

Anthony Callea singles chronology
"Per Sempre (for Always)" (2005)	"Live for Love" (2006)	"Addicted to You" (2007)

Music video
- "Live For Love" on YouTube

"Live for Love" is a pop rock ballad by Anthony Callea from his second album A New Chapter (2006), and the first single released from the album. Anthony performed the song live at Highpoint Shopping Centre in Melbourne on 9 November, and also on Australian Idol 2006 elimination night on 6 November. When purchased at the iTunes Store, this single comes with an exclusive track entitled "Meant for Love", which didn't make the album's final cut.

== Track listing ==
- Australian release
1. "Live for Love" (single edit)
2. "Live for Love" (Bc Urban Love remix)
3. "Live for Love" (Bc Sub-Urban Love remix)
4. "Live for Love" (music video)

== Charts ==
Chart (2006–2007)	Peak position
Australia (ARIA)	9
