= Addicted to You (Anthony Callea song) =

2007 single by Anthony Callea

Single by Anthony Callea

from the album A New Chapter
- Released: 3 February 2007
- Recorded: 2006
- Genre: Pop rock, pop
- Length: 3:33
- Label: Sony BMG
- Songwriter(s): Anthony Callea, Paul Whitshire, Victoria Wu
- Producer(s): Paul Whitshire, James Kempster

Anthony Callea singles chronology
"Live for Love" (2006)	"Addicted to You" (2007)	"Oh Oh Oh Oh" (2011)

Music video
- "Addicted To You" on YouTube

"Addicted to You" is the second single by Anthony Callea from his second album, A New Chapter (2006). The single was released to radio on 12 December 2006. "Addicted to You" has a more contemporary pop-rock sound which Callea explores in his second album, and is very different from the ballad sound in his previous single "Live for Love". The single was released on 3 February 2007 and it included two B-side tracks, "Try" and "Meant for Love".

Anthony performed the song at the Robina Instore at the Gold Coast on 25 November 2006, the day of the release of A New Chapter and also on Sunrise on 24 November.

The music video for the song was directed by Owen Trevor. The video showed Callea and his band performing the song on the roof of the fifteen storey AWA Tower in Sydney.

== Track listing ==
- Australian release
1. "Addicted to You" (single mix)
2. "Try"
3. "Meant for Love"
4. "Addicted to You" (music video)

== Charts ==
Chart (2007)	Peak position
Australia (ARIA)	19
