= ARIA Number 1 Hits in Symphony =

Studio album by Anthony Callea
- Released: 1 September 2017
- Recorded: 2017
- Genre: Pop
- Label: Sony Music Australia
- Producer: John Foreman

Anthony Callea chronology
Backbone (2016)	ARIA Number 1 Hits in Symphony (2017)	Forty Love (2022)

ARIA Number 1 Hits in Symphony is the sixth studio album by Australian pop singer Anthony Callea. It features instrumentation by the Melbourne Symphony Orchestra. The album features a selection of tracks that have peaked at number 1 on the ARIA Charts. The album was announced in June 2017 and was released on 1 September 2017.

Upon announcement, Callea said "[These are] Songs that have not only been part of my musical landscape for the past 30 years but have resonated with so many of us – the ARIA charts don't lie."

== Tour ==
Callea will also perform a one-off show alongside the Melbourne Symphony Orchestra at Hamer Hall in Melbourne on 8 September 2017. Callea said: "As a singer who craves the art of live performance, I could not think of anyone else I would want to collaborate with than the Melbourne Symphony Orchestra, not only for their grandiose live concert experience, but also a stunning recorded body of work. With one of the finest orchestras in the world conducted by my dear friend and album producer John Foreman and collaborating also with my own incredible band members, these iconic ARIA Number #1 hits will be presented in a way you have never experienced before."

== Track listing ==
No.	Title	Writer(s)	Length
1.	"All of Me" (John Legend song)	John Stephens; Toby Gad
2.	"Bleeding Love" (Leona Lewis song)	Jesse McCartney; Ryan Tedder
3.	"Save the Best for Last" (Vanessa Williams song)	Phil Galdston; Wendy Waldman; Jon Lind
4.	"I Swear" (All-4-One song)	Gary Baker; Frank J. Myers
5.	"(Everything I Do) I Do It for You" (Bryan Adams song)	Bryan Adams; Michael Kamen; Robert Lange
6.	"Jesus to a Child" (George Michael song)	George Michael
7.	"It Must Have Been Love" (Roxette song)	Per Gessle
8.	"Nothing Compares 2 U" (Sinéad O'Connor song)	Prince
9.	"Right Here Waiting" (Richard Marx song)	Richard Marx
10.	"Rain"	Andreas Romdhane; Josef Larossi; Savan Kotecha
11.	"Someone Like You" (Adele song)	Adele; Dan Wilson
12.	"End of the Road" (Boyz II Men song)	Kenneth Edmonds; Antonio Reid; Daryl Simmons

== Charts ==
Chart (2017)	Peak position
Australian Albums (ARIA)	1

== Release history ==
Region	Date	Format	Label	Catalogue
Australia	1 September 2017	CD, digital download	Sony Music Australia	88985453372

== See also ==
- List of number-one albums of 2017 (Australia)
