= What's Wrong with Me? =

Single by Anthony Callea
- Released: 25 October 2019
- Length: 3:55
- Label: Anthony Callea
- Songwriter(s): Anthony Callea; Robert De Sa; Isabella Kearny-Nurse

Anthony Callea singles chronology
| "Christmas Day" (2015) | "What's Wrong with Me?" (2019) |

Music video
- "What's Wrong with Me?" on YouTube

"What's Wrong with Me?" is a song by Australian singer song writer Anthony Callea. It was self-released on 25 October 2019.

Callea said "'What's Wrong with Me?' is a deep and meaningful song for me. It's inherently personal but also a song that I think many will be able to relate to. Telling a story through music is in my DNA and when I close my eyes and get behind the mic, I feel like I am home. It's an honour to share this song with Australia and the World. Self-discovery is a beautiful yet confronting and scary process, so I hope that when you hear this song, you connect with me and we share a moment together, a moment of honesty, purity and respect."

== Reception ==
Out in Perth said "We've had a couple of listens to the new tune and it's very powerful and instantly memorable."

== Charts ==
| Chart (2019) | Peak position |
|---|---|
| Australia Digital Tracks (ARIA) | 35 |
