= Home: Songs of Hope & Journey =

Compilation album by various artists
- Released: 25 November 2006
- Recorded: 2006
- Genre: Pop
- Length: 50:06
- Label: Sony BMG

Home: Songs of Hope & Journey is a compilation album, by various Australian artists and a New Zealander (Dave Dobbyn), to raise funds and bring attention to Beyond Blue, an Australian charity against depression. The album debuted at No. 40 on the ARIA Albums Chart on 3 December 2006, but dropped out of the top 50 in the following week. Amazon.com editorial reviewer described it as providing "well known and loved songs from some of Australia's best artists."

"Don't Give Up", the lead single, is a cover version of Peter Gabriel and Kate Bush's duet recorded in 1986. Noll and Bassingthwaighte's rendition peaked at No. 2 in December 2006 and remained in the top 50 for 21 weeks.

== Track listing ==
1. Anthony Callea – "Home"
2. Shannon Noll and Natalie Bassingthwaighte – "Don't Give Up"
3. Human Nature – "Until You Come Back to Me (That's What I'm Gonna Do)"
4. Guy Sebastian and Amy Pearson – "We Both Know"
5. David Campbell – "Sailing"
6. Young Divas – "2000 Miles"
7. Alex Lloyd – "Coming Home" (Acoustic Version)
8. Kate Miller-Heidke – "River"
9. Michael Paynter – "Better Be Home Soon"
10. Kane Alexander – "Get Here"
11. Dave Dobbyn – "Welcome Home"
12. Girlband – "By Your Side"
13. The Inches – "Starman"

== Charts ==
Chart (2006)	Peak position
Australian Album Chart	40

== See also ==
- Beyond Blue
