= This Is Christmas (Anthony Callea album) =

Studio album by Anthony Callea
- Released: 8 November 2013
- Genre: Christmas music
- Label: ABC Music

Anthony Callea chronology
Thirty (2013)	This Is Christmas (2013)	Ladies & Gentlemen: The Songs of George Michael (2014)

This Is Christmas is the fourth studio and first Christmas album by Australian recording artist Anthony Callea. It was released on 8 November 2013 by ABC Music. The album mostly consists of Christmas classics such as "Silent Night" and "O Holy Night", but also includes cover versions of recent Christmas pop songs by such as "Don't Save It All for Christmas Day" by Céline Dion and "Note to God" by JoJo.

== Review ==
Ben Ryan of Renowned for Sound gave the album 4 of out 5, saying; "If you pick this album up, expect vocal gymnastics, and expect lead-footed vibrato. Callea is obviously an accomplished vocalist, but for the greater part of the record there is just one level he sings at – there is the occasional dynamic variation, but for the most part the tunes are sung with incessant vigour." He added, "The choir is a particularly appealing feature of this record; there is great poignancy inherent in any well-organised raft of young voices, and employing them in a moving piece like 'Ave Maria' almost guarantees some goose bumps".

== Track listing ==
No.	Title	Writer(s)	Length
1.	"Don't Save It All for Christmas Day"	Peter Zizzo / Ric Wake / Céline Dion	4:11
2.	"The First Noel"	traditional	3:44
3.	"Christmas (Baby Please Come Home)"	Jeff Barry / Ellie Greenwich / Phil Spector	2:26
4.	"Silent Night"	Franz Xaver Gruber / Joseph Mohr / John Freeman Young	3:26
5.	"Santa Claus Is Coming to Town"	John Frederick Coots / Haven Gillespie	2:33
6.	"Ave Maria"		3:48
7.	"Do You Hear What I Hear?"	Noël Regney / Gloria Shayne Baker	3:19
8.	"Mary, Did You Know?"	Mark Lowry / Buddy Greene	3:26
9.	"Have Yourself a Merry Little Christmas"	Hugh Martin / Ralph Blane	3:03
10.	"Amazing Grace"	John Newton / traditional	3:25
11.	"O Holy Night"	Adolphe Adam	4:00
12.	"Note to God"	Diane Warren	3:49

== Charts ==
The album debuted at number 60 on the ARIA Chart but peaked at #47.

Chart (2013)	Peak position
Australian Albums (ARIA)	47
