= Thirty (album) =

Studio album by Anthony Callea
- Released: 26 April 2013
- Genres: Pop; adult contemporary
- Length: 51:15
- Label: ABC Music
- Producer: James Kempster

Anthony Callea chronology
| Last To Go (2012) | Thirty (2013) | This Is Christmas (2013) |

Thirty is the third studio album by Australian recording artist Anthony Callea. It was released on 26 April 2013, by ABC Music.

== Background ==
Thirty is Callea's first studio album signed with ABC Music. The album contains a collection of inspirational songs that embrace the artists and music that had influenced him over the years, as well as some original tracks. Thirty includes ten covers along with two originals, "My All" and "I'll Be the One".

Callea said of the album:

"A lot of these songs I've sung in a live environment, but I've never actually recorded. I wanted to have the opportunity to record them, call the album 'Thirty' and then put a couple of originals on it too. The new songs have been sitting in my iTunes folder for years and I've just been waiting for the right time to have them part of a body of work that I'm really proud of". Callea said that each song on this album has a special significance to him, "These are songs that mean something to me, whether it's melodically or the lyrics behind it or the artist singing it."

== Promotion ==
=== Live performances ===
On 25 April 2013, Callea released a video for his song "My All" which features Tim Campbell. On 2 May 2013, Callea performed "My All" live on Sunrise.

Throughout May, Callea toured Westfield shopping centres in Knox, Liverpool, Castle Hill, Brisbane and Marion to promote the album.

=== Tour ===
The THIRTY Live in Concert tour saw Callea promote the album with a 7-date tour throughout July and August 2013 performing songs from Thirty to audiences across the East Coast, kicking off 13 July at The Palms at Melbourne's Crown Casino and continuing through NSW and QLD for seven dates in July and August.

| Date | Location | Venue |
|---|---|---|
| 13 July 2013 | Melbourne | The Palms at Crown |
| 26 July 2013 | Bankstown | Bankstown Sports Club |
| 27 July 2013 | Northern Sydney | Dee Why RSL |
| 2 August 2013 | Sydney | South Sydney Juniors |
| 3 August 2013 | Newcastle | Belmont 16 Foot Sailing Club |
| 9 August 2013 | Brisbane | Broncos League Club |
| 10 August 2013 | Brisbane | Twin Town Resort |

== Track listing ==
| No. | Title | Writer(s) | Length |
|---|---|---|---|
| 1. | "Go the Distance" | Alan Menken; David Zippel | 4:43 |
| 2. | "Leave Right Now" | Eg White | 3:33 |
| 3. | "My All" | | 3:55 |
| 4. | "Di Sole E D'azzurro" | | 4:21 |
| 5. | "Get Here" | Brenda Russell | 4:45 |
| 6. | "Alone" (featuring Susie Ahern) | Billy Steinberg; Tom Kelly | 4:03 |
| 7. | "Dance with My Father" | Luther Vandross; Richard Marx | 4:20 |
| 8. | "I'll Be the One" | | 4:02 |
| 9. | "When You Believe" | Stephen Schwartz; Babyface | 4:38 |
| 10. | "The Flame" | Bob Mitchell; Nick Graham | 4:55 |
| 11. | "Perfect Fan" | Brian Littrell; Thomas Smith | 4:14 |
| 12. | "Nella Fantasia" | Ennio Morricone; Chiara Ferraù | 3:46 |

== Charts ==
| Chart (2013) | Peak position |
|---|---|
| Australian Albums (ARIA) | 18 |

== Release history ==
| Region | Date | Format | Label |
|---|---|---|---|
| Australia | 26 April 2013 | CD, digital download | ABC Music |
