= Straight 8 =

straight 8 is an independent filmmaking event founded in 1999 and based in the United Kingdom. The name is derived from the medium and editing style used to create the short films. Participants use Super 8 mm film (commonly referred to as Super 8), shooting and editing in-camera ("straight") on a single Super 8 cartridge.

== Annual Competition ==
Each year, filmmakers are invited to submit entries for the event. The competition is open to filmmakers from around the world. Films may be of any topic or theme, and filmmakers produce a separated soundtrack to accompany the film. Films may be a maximum of three minutes and twenty seconds, a limitation of the Super 8 medium. straight 8 judges evaluate the entries and the winners are screened at film events including the Raindance Film Festival and the Cannes Film Festival.
