= A New Chapter (Anthony Callea album) =

Studio album by Anthony Callea
- Released: 25 November 2006
- Recorded: 2006
- Genre: Pop
- Length: 62:26
- Label: Sony BMG
- Producer: Phil Buckle, Vince Pizzinga, Tom Nichols, Klaus Derendorf, David Erikson, James Kempster, Chong Lim, James Roche, Paul L. Wiltshire, Victoria Wu

Anthony Callea chronology
Anthony Callea (2005)	A New Chapter (2006)	Last To Go (2012)

Singles from A New Chapter
- 1. "Live for Love" Released: 3 November 2006; 2. "Addicted to You" Released: 3 February 2007

Professional ratings
Review scores
Source	Rating
Herald Sun	3.5/5 stars

A New Chapter is the second album from Australian pop singer Anthony Callea. It features the singles "Live for Love" and "Addicted to You".

A New Chapter features two exclusive tracks entitled "Whatever It Takes" (originally recorded by Edyta Górniak for the album Invisible) and "Meant for Love" when purchased digitally, which didn't make the album's final cut. "Meant for Love" instead appeared on the "Addicted to You" single, along with "Try" and another iTunes-exclusive track "Far from Over". The album debuted at #9 on the ARIA Albums Chart, and was certified Gold by ARIA.

== Track listing ==
No.	Title	Writer(s)	Length
1.	"A New Chapter"	Anthony Callea, Tim Baxter, Klaus Derendorf, Tom Nichols	4:24
2.	"Perfect Mistake"	Callea, Derendorf, Nichols	4:04
3.	"Addicted to You"	Callea, Paul Wiltshire, Victoria Wu	3:32
4.	"If Only"	Callea, Baxter, Nichols	3:51
5.	"Best I Can Be"	Callea, Vince Pizzinga	3:47
6.	"Live for Love"	Paul Cecchinelli, Gary Pinto	4:05
7.	"Stranded"	Callea, Adam Reily, Amba Shepherd	4:30
8.	"Want You to See"	Callea, Jimmy Christo, James Kempster	2:54
9.	"Here I Go Again"	Callea, Phil Buckle	4:31
10.	"There's Always Time"	Callea, Christo, Kempster	3:46
11.	"Almost"	Callea, Reily, Shepherd	4:44
12.	"You Saved Me Tonight"	Callea, Cliff Masterson	4:16
13.	"Runaway"	Callea, David Eriksen, Nichols	3:40
14.	"Heartbeat"	Callea, Gary Clark	4:06
15.	"Now You're Gone"	Callea, Steve Balsamo, Ben Robbins	4:16

Digital bonus tracks
No.	Title	Length
16.	"Whatever It Takes"	4:05
17.	"Meant for Love"	3:16

== Charts ==
Chart (2006)	Peak position
Australian Albums (ARIA)	9

== Certifications ==
Region	Certification	Certified units/sales
Australia (ARIA)	Gold	35,000^{^}
^{^} Shipments figures based on certification alone.
