= Hurts So Bad =

2005 single by Anthony Callea

Single by Anthony Callea

from the album Anthony Callea
- Released: 4 July 2005
- Recorded: 2005
- Length: 3:05
- Label: Sony BMG
- Songwriter(s): R James Dyke, Marc Nelkin, Eric Sanicola
- Producer(s): Bryon Jones, Eric Sanicola

Anthony Callea singles chronology
| "Rain" / "Bridge over Troubled Water" (2005) | "Hurts So Bad" (2005) | "Per Sempre (For Always)" (2005) |

Music video
- "Hurts So Bad" on YouTube

"Hurts So Bad" is the third single released by Australian Idol series two runner-up Anthony Callea. The song appears on his self-titled debut album, Anthony Callea (2005). It was his third consecutive top-10 single in Australia but was his first not to reach number one.

== Track listing ==
The single had four versions of "Hurts So Bad" and came with a bonus sticker.

1. "Hurts So Bad" (album version)
2. "Hurts So Bad" (Low Frequency Occupation Crazy Fader Remix)
3. "Hurts So Bad" (M.N. Re-Work)
4. "Hurts So Bad" (Low Frequency Occupation Summer Funk Club Mix)

== Music video ==
The music video feature Callea with a mystery woman, it was filmed in Cuba, there is a scene where Callea performed in front of Che Guevara portrait.

== Charts ==
| Chart (2005) | Peak position |
|---|---|
| Australia (ARIA) | 10 |
