= Tim Campbell (actor) =

Australian actor and singer

- Born: 27 September 1975 (age 51); Sydney, Australia
- Occupations: Actor and singer
- Years active: 1993–present
- Spouse: Anthony Callea (m. 2014)

Tim Campbell (born 27 September 1975) is an Australian television and stage actor and singer, best known for playing the character of Dan Baker in the soap opera Home and Away between 2004 and 2007. In 2007, he came third in series 6 of Dancing with the Stars.

== Career ==
In 1993, Campbell appeared in two episodes of Home and Away as Brad. Throughout the 1990s, Campbell appeared in episodes of Heartbreak High, Police Rescue, The Day of the Roses and Wildside. In 1999, he appeared in 13 episodes of Big Sky as Blake Wallace. Smaller roles continued throughout the early 2000s, until 2003 where he played Constable Stubbs in the children's television series, Snobs. In 2004, Campbell was cast to play Dan Baker on Home and Away, where he appeared in 287 episodes. Campbell was a contestant in series six of Dancing with the Stars, which premiered on 20 February 2007. He ultimately placed third. He hosted National Bingo Night as well as the first season of travel series Discover Tasmania in 2007. Also in 2007, Campbell appeared as a contestant on Deal or No Deal: Dancing with the Deals, in which he won $23,999 for a home viewer.

In 2008, Campbell hosted Million Dollar Wheel of Fortune which was short lived before replacing Joey Fatone on hosting The Singing Bee from 2008 to 2010.

In 2010, Campbell played Mr Doyle in 13 episodes of Dead Gorgeous and between 2012 and 2013, he played Tom on House Husbands. Tom, with partner Kane (Gyton Grantley), raise a child together on the show, with the pairing becoming the first gay male couple with a child to be featured on an Australian prime-time drama series. On 14 December 2013, it was announced that Campbell had been written out of the show and would not return for its third season.

== Filmography ==
=== Film ===
Year	Title	Role	Notes
2000	Angst	Barnsey	
2001	Rooms for Rent		
2002	Searching for Mr. Right.Com	Simon	
2005	The Great Raid	Cpl. Friedberg	

=== Television ===
Year	Title	Role	Notes
1993	Home and Away	Brad	Season 6, Episodes 84 & 90
1994	Heartbreak High	Debating Team Member	Season 1, Episode 7
1996	Police Rescue	Hugo	Season 5, Episode 1
1998	The Day of the Roses	McCrossan	Miniseries (2 episodes)
1999	Big Sky	Blake Wallace	Season 2 (main role, 13 episodes)
1999	Wildside	Hamish Nash	Season 2, Episode 15
2000	Water Rats	Peter Kostos	Season 5, Episode 29
2001	Life Support	Man with candle	Season 1, Episode 2
2001–02	Always Greener	Joe Farnell	Season 1, Episodes 3, 5 & 16
2002	Beastmaster	Galen	Season 3, Episode 16
2002	The Lost World	Young Challenger	Season 3, Episode 18
2002	Life Support	Police sketch artist	Season 2, episode 3
2002	McLeod's Daughters	Finn O'Neill	Season 2, Episode 15
2003	White Collar Blue	Father Michael Connelly	Season 2, Episode 4
2003	Snobs	Constable Stubbs	Season 1 (recurring, 13 episodes)
2004–07	Home and Away	Dan Baker	Seasons 17–20 (main role)
2005	Dynasty: The Making of a Guilty Pleasure	P.A.	TV movie
2010	Dead Gorgeous	Mr. Doyle	Season 1 (supporting, 13 episodes)
2010	Sea Patrol	Harry Edwards	Season 4, Episode 11
2011	Combat Hospital	Capt. Clark Herndon	Season 1, Episode 8
2012–13	House Husbands	Tom Parker	Seasons 1–2 (main role, 22 episodes)
2016	Please Like Me	George	Season 4, Episode 3
2018	Olivia Newton-John: Hopelessly Devoted to You	Brendan Murphy	Miniseries (1 episode)

=== Theatre ===
Year	Title	Role	Location / Company
2007	Rent	Roger	Perth
2008	Shout! The Legend of The Wild One	Johnny O'Keefe	Melbourne & Sydney
2009	The Boy Friend	Bobby	State Theatre (Melbourne) with The Production Company
2010	Wicked	Fiyero	Sydney season of the Australian production
2016	Hairspray the Arena Spectacular	Corny Collins	Australian national tour
2017	Grease the Arena Experience	Johnny Casino	Harvest Rain Theatre Company

=== Music ===
Campbell released his debut studio album High School Disco on 4 April 2014. The album peaked at number 25 on the ARIA Charts. Campbell released his second studio album, Electrifying 80s in July 2018.

Title	Album details	Peak chart positions
Title	Album details	AUS
High School Disco	Released: 4 April 2014; Label: Universal Music Australia; Format: CD, digital download	25
Electrifying 80s	Released: 27 July 2018; Label: Encore Records; Format: CD, digital download, streaming	15

== Personal life ==
In late 2007, rumours of Campbell dating singer Anthony Callea surfaced in the media. During an interview, Campbell confirmed that he is gay, but denied romantic involvement with Callea. However, on 11 February 2008, during an appearance on Vega 91.5's breakfast program, Campbell acknowledged that he and Callea had now progressed to being "an item" stating that they were "very happy" together. The couple later thanked their fans for the support they were shown after their relationship was made public. On 18 August 2014, Campbell and Callea announced their engagement.

On 17 November 2014, they announced they had been married in a ceremony in New Zealand.

Preceded by Tamsyn Lewis & Arsen Kishishian	Dancing with the Stars (Australia) third place contestant Season 6 (Early 2007 with Natalie Lowe)	Succeeded by David Hobson & Karina Schembri
Preceded by New series	Discover Tasmania co-presenter (with Ed Halmagyi); 2007–2008	Succeeded by Jack Campbell
