= Anthony Callea =

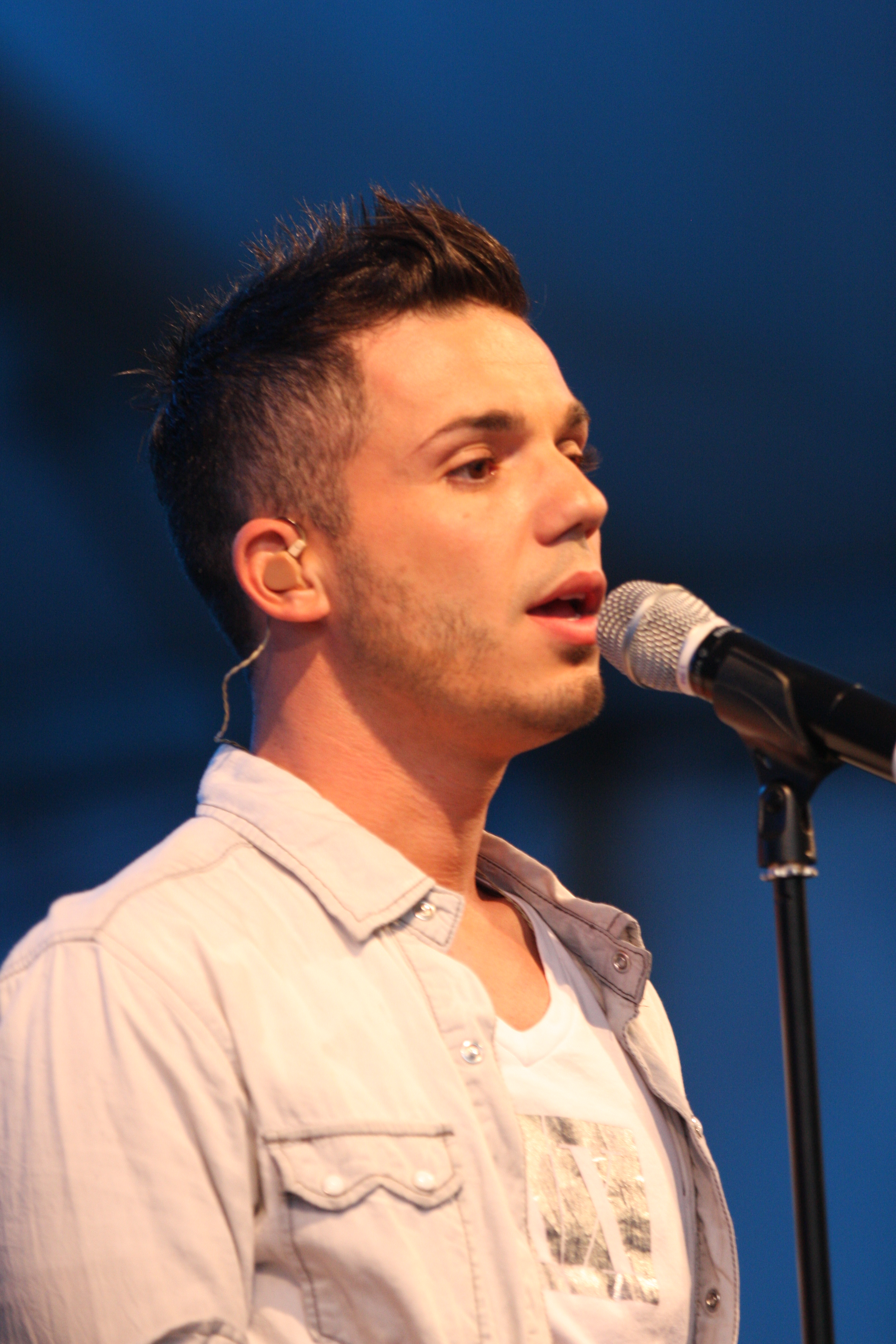
- Anthony Callea at the 2012 Multicultural Festival Canberra, in February 2012

Background information
- Born: Anthony Cosmo Callea; 13 December 1982 (age 43); Melbourne, Australia
- Genres: Pop rock, dance-pop
- Occupations: Singer-songwriter, musical theatre actor
- Years active: 2004–present
- Labels: Sony Music Australia (2004–2009); ABC Music (2013–2015); Sony Music Australia (2016–present)
- Spouse: Tim Campbell (m. 2014)
- Website: www.anthonycallea.com.au

Anthony Cosmo Callea (born 13 December 1982) is an Australian singer-songwriter and stage actor who rose to prominence as the runner-up in the 2004 season of Australian Idol. Callea's debut single, a cover of Celine Dion and Andrea Bocelli's song "The Prayer", is the fastest-selling single by an Australian artist; it held the number-one spot on the ARIA Singles Chart for five weeks, a record for the debut single of an Australian Idol contestant, and was the second-highest-selling Australian single of the 2000s.

Callea has accumulated a string of awards, including an ARIA Music Award, Channel V Artist of the Year, Pop Republic Artist of the Year, MTV Viewers' Choice Award, Variety's Young Entertainer of the Year, an MO Award, and a Gospel Music Award. He is known for his powerful, trained voice and his versatility in a range of genres in releases and live performances. All but one of the tracks on his second album A New Chapter were co-written by him. October 2011 saw Callea release his first new music in four years, a single titled "Oh Oh Oh Oh Oh", self-funded, released and distributed as a fully independent venture through his own production company, Vox Enterprises. The dance-pop track was co-written in LA with two-time Grammy-nominated and official DJ for the Black Eyed Peas, Poet Name Life.

In March 2013, it was announced that Callea signed a record deal with ABC Music and would release his third studio album on 26 April 2013. The new release, entitled Thirty, was the first of two albums released that year, and were distributed by Universal Music. The second, released on 8 November 2013, was a Christmas album titled This Is Christmas. In August 2014, Callea released his third album with ABC music, but, in contrast to previous albums, this was a Live DVD/CD Ladies & Gentlemen: The Songs of George Michael filmed and recorded at the Palms at Crown Melbourne. The DVD debuted at number 1 on the Australian ARIA Charts. On 5 August 2016, after three albums with ABC Music, Callea announced that he had re-signed with Sony Music Australia and released his sixth album Backbone in September 2016.

== Early life and music career ==
Anthony Callea is the eldest child and first grandchild on both sides of the family. He has 16 cousins. His family were builders, dentists and lawyers.

Anthony Callea started singing and performing at age five after telling his mother that he wanted to be a singer. His mother sent him to a performing arts school and began vocal training with Liana Scali, with whom he remained until the age of 18.

In a 2014 interview with Sydney Unleashed, Callea stated, "I started recording and writing when I was 16. When I turned 18, I started gigging more and eventually was working 2-3 nights a week. I also became a vocal coach and ended up having 32 private students a week. I was 21 when I auditioned for Australian Idol and that was definitely the turning point for me."

=== 2004: Australian Idol ===
He was selected for the final 30 in the television series Australian Idol in 2004. Based on viewer votes, he did not make it through the first round of competition, but was invited back as a "Judge's Choice Wildcard", where his performance earned him a place in the final 12. The competition concluded in November 2004 with Callea finishing as runner-up to Casey Donovan.

Australian Idol performances and results (2004)
| Episode | Song | Result |
|---|---|---|
| Audition | "Wishes" by Human Nature | Through to the Theatre Rounds |
| Theatre Rounds | Unknown | progress to top 30 |
| Top 30 | "Angel" by Sarah McLachlan | did not progress / through to Judge's Choice Wildcard |
| Judge's Choice Wildcard | "The Reason" by Hoobastank | Through to live shows |
| Live show 1: Australian Made (Top 12) | "Heaven Knows" by Rick Price | Saved by Public |
| Live show 2: Pop (Top 11) | "Ignition" by R. Kelly | Saved by Public |
| Live show 3: The '60s (Top 10) | "Gimme Some Lovin'" by Spencer Davis Group | Saved by Public |
| Live show 4: Disco (Top 9) | "Car Wash" by Rose Royce | Saved by Public |
| Live show 5: Contestants' Choice (Top 8) | "The Prayer" by Andrea Bocelli and Céline Dion | Saved by Public |
| Live show 6: Beatles (Top 7) | "I Saw Her Standing There" by The Beatles | Saved by Public |
| Live show 7: The '80s (Top 6) | "I Want to Know What Love Is" by Foreigner | Saved by Public |
| Live show 8: RnB-Soul (Top 5) | "Back at One" by Brian McKnight | Saved by Public |
| Live show 9: (Top 4) | "Fever" and "(Get Your Kicks On) Route 66" by Nat King Cole | Saved by Public |
| Live show 10: (Top 3) | "Hold the Line" by Toto and "Bridge over Troubled Water" by Simon and Garfunkel | Saved by Public |
| Live show 11: Grand Final | "Listen with Your Heart" (Winner's Single) by Diane Warren, "Walking Away" by Craig David and "Glory of Love" by Peter Cetera | Eliminated in 2nd position |

Callea was immediately signed to Sony/BMG Records, and released "The Prayer" as his debut single in December 2004. It debuted on the ARIA Singles Chart at number one and was certified four times platinum, selling in excess of 280,000 copies. In 2010 ARIA named it as the second-highest selling single of the last decade.

=== 2005–2007: Self-titled album and A New Chapter ===
In March 2005, Callea released the double A-side "Rain"/"Bridge over Troubled Water", which spent two weeks at number one on the ARIA chart and was certified 2× Platinum. His self-titled debut album debuted at number one in April 2005. His third single "Hurts So Bad" peaked at number ten on the ARIA Charts, while the album's fourth and final single, "Per Sempre (for Always)" peaked at number five.

In July 2005, Callea made an east coast of Australia tour, adding dates along the way in 2005. The Live in Concert DVD was released on 7 November 2005. It debuted at No. 3 in the ARIA DVD Chart and was certified platinum.

In 2006, wrote and recorded tracks for his second album overseas. Upon returning to Australia, Sony BMG insisted he record "Live for Love", which was released in November 2006 as the lead single from his second album. It is the only song on the album which he did not co-write. Callea's second album A New Chapter was released in November 2006. Both the single and the album debuted at number 9. The album was supported with a national tour.

In November 2006, Callea also contributed his version of the Brian McKnight song, "Home", to the compilation album Home: Songs of Hope & Journey, which was released to raise funds for BeyondBlue.

In February 2007, "Addicted to You" was released and peaked at number 19 on the ARIA charts.

In 2007, Callea was one of the professional voices on a Seven Network's weekly musical competition program, It Takes Two, in which celebrities from non-musical fields were teamed with professional singers to perform a duet each week. Callea was paired with radio DJ Jo Stanley and finished in second place. In 2008, Callea again performed, this time with ironwoman Candice Falzon. Callea and Falzon finished in fifth place.

In September 2007, in his first musical production, Callea played a supporting role in Dead Man Walking, the true story of Sister Helen Prejean, an unconventional nun, who accompanies murderer Joe de Rocher to his death by execution. It explores the opposing desires for vengeance and forgiveness in this extreme situation, and the commitment required to love or to hate a fellow human being.

In November 2007, Callea played the lead role Mark Cohen in the Perth production of the rock musical Rent. He starred alongside his now-partner, Tim Campbell.

In mid 2008, Callea took the role of Boq in the Melbourne premiere of the Broadway musical Wicked.

In November 2008, Callea flew to New York to record a musical theatre album, but lacked passion and decided against recording it. Shortly after, Callea was released from his contract with Sony BMG.

=== 2009–2012: Last to Go ===
In 2010, Callea joined the cast of Foxtel's Ultimate School Musical: Fame documentary, which followed year 7-12 students from Essendon Keilor College learning performing arts skills. Callea was the series' voice coach.

In October 2011, Callea released the single "Oh Oh Oh Oh" independently. The song peaked at number 111 on the ARIA Charts. This was followed in February 2012 by the EP, Last to Go.

=== 2013–2014: Thirty, This Is Christmas & Ladies & Gentlemen: The Songs of George Michael ===
In March 2013, Callea announced the release of his third studio album Thirty on ABC Music. Upon announcement, Callea said "Turning thirty last December was an exciting time and I decided I needed to record an album that encapsulated the past thirty years for me. Both musically and emotionally, this album is a collection of inspirational songs that embrace the artists and music that have influenced me over the years. I have also wanted to record and release a couple of originals that I wrote a while back but have been waiting for the right time, so I am very excited to have them become part of the thirty album".

In July 2013, Callea was cast as Johnny Casino in the Australian production of Grease (musical).

In November 2013, Callea released the Christmas album, This Is Christmas with duets with the National Boys Choir and husband Tim Campbell.

On 16 May 2014, Callea performed a one-off concert titled Ladies & Gentlemen: The Songs of George Michael. This concert was recorded and released on CD and DVD on 1 August 2014. In June, Callea announced an extension of his Ladies & Gentlemen: The Songs of George Michael concert, with dates in September and October 2014 in Perth, Adelaide, Brisbane, Sydney and Melbourne.

=== 2016–2018: Backbone & ARIA Number 1 Hits in Symphony ===
In January 2016, Callea was revealed as a contestant on season 2 of I'm a Celebrity...Get Me Out of Here! Australia. He placed fourth in the series. He also described his time in the jungle as one of the best experiences of his life and hoped that it brought more awareness to his chosen charity Lifeline (crisis support service).

In September 2016, Callea released his fifth studio album Backbone, which debuted at number 1 on the ARIA Charts. Callea promoted the album with a 5-date tour.

In September 2017, Callea released his sixth studio albumARIA Number 1 Hits in Symphony which also debuted at number 1 on the ARIA Charts.

Late in 2017, Callea had written a song and was preparing to represent Australia in the Eurovision Song Contest 2018, before being advised this wouldn't be the case, days before Jessica Mauboy was announced in December 2017.

=== 2019–2021: Stand-alone singles ===
In October 2019, Called released the stand-alone single "What's Wrong with Me?". This was followed in 2020 with "Lonely" and "Shadows".

In October 2020, Callea was announced as a competing celebrity contestant on the fifth season of The Celebrity Apprentice Australia which aired in early 2021. Callea went on the show supporting the Children's Cancer Foundation, and raised $20k for them before he was "fired" in task 4.

In 2021 Callea toured Australia on the Together Again tour.

=== 2022–present: Forty Love and Behind the Voice: Dietro la Voce ===
On 30 September 2022, Callea released "Heaven" and announced the forthcoming release of the studio album, Forty Love, which was released on 21 October 2022. Upon announcement, Callea said "This album celebrates my 40 years in this life, yeah I can't believe it either! It feels like nothing else I have ever released, it's entirely me expressed through music which I am so proud of. It celebrates and appreciates the love and happiness I am fortunate to have, whilst also taking stock of the unpredictability and highs and lows of life. It is my DNA carved and molded into music and lyrics and I truly hope it resonates with people for its stories and its pop melodies as we all navigate this thing called life!". The album's second single was a song titled "Only One". The album peaked at number 5 on the ARIA Charts.

In April 2023, Callea released his autobiography Behind the Voice: Dietro la Voce.

=== Notable performances ===
- In 2005, performed with Luciano Pavarotti on his last trip to Australia.
- In March 2006, performed for Queen Elizabeth II at Commonwealth Day Church Service in Sydney.
- In 2006, Callea was the support act for the Australian leg of Diana Ross's I Love You 2006 tour.
- In 2007, Callea was the support act for Westlife's Arena Tour.
- In 2008, Callea was the support act for Celine Dion's Taking Chances world tour.
- In February 2009, joined Tina Arena to perform an impromptu performance of "The Prayer" at Melbourne's Grand Hyatt re-launch
- In 2010, was a special guest of the Australian leg of Whitney Houston's Nothing but Love World Tour.
- In January 2011, performed a one-off special concert for the Australian Flood Victims at Rally For Relief at Rod Laver Arena, Melbourne.
- In 2013, supported Mariah Carey on her first Australian shows in 14 years.
- In 2013, performed "Go the Distance" at The Special Olympics 2013 Asia Pacific Opening Ceremony.
- In 2022 Callea sang at Shane Warne state memorial service.

== Personal life ==
On 27 March 2007, after speculation and tabloid rumours dating back to his Idol appearances, Callea publicly acknowledged that he is gay by issuing a statement confirming his sexuality and thanking his fans and his then-partner, Paul Riggio, who worked as a talent coordinator on Australian Idol during Anthony's run on the show.

"Yes, I am gay", Callea said. "I have no issue with my sexuality now, but it's taken time to become confident with who I am and happy with who I am. I'm comfortable enough to come clean now. It's a weight off my shoulders".

On 30 March 2007, then Justice of the High Court of Australia Michael Kirby (who is also openly gay) described Callea as an "admirable Australian" for coming out. Justice Kirby added, "In terms of influencing popular culture and understanding of the reality of human sexual diversity, I would trade ten judges for one popular singer."

Callea has also admitted to suffering from depression in his teenage years, saying, "I went through major depression. I hated myself. I had to see a psychologist. I wasn't talking to anybody. My parents didn't know what was wrong with me." Callea has since supported beyondblue, an Australian initiative against depression, by contributing his version of a Brian McKnight song, "Home", to a compilation album, Home: Songs of Hope & Journey.

In February 2008, he and actor/singer Tim Campbell confirmed that they were in a relationship after they broke up with their respective partners to be together. On 18 August 2014, Campbell and Callea announced their engagement. They were married in New Zealand in November 2014.

== Discography ==
- Anthony Callea (2005)
- A New Chapter (2006)
- Thirty (2013)
- This Is Christmas (2013)
- Backbone (2016)
- ARIA Number 1 Hits in Symphony (2017)
- Forty Love (2022)

== Awards and nominations ==
=== ARIA Music Awards ===
The ARIA Music Awards is an annual awards ceremony that recognises excellence, innovation, and achievement across all genres of Australian music. It commenced in 1987.

| Year | Nominee / work | Award | Result | Ref. |
|---|---|---|---|---|
| 2005 | Anthony Callea | Highest Selling Album | Nominated | |
| 2005 | "The Prayer" | Highest Selling Single | Won | |
| 2005 | "Rain" / "Bridge Over Troubled Water" | Highest Selling Single | Nominated | |

=== Channel V Oz Artist of the Year ===
The Channel V Oz Artist of the Year was an annual award presented by Channel V Australia and was voted by the Australian public. It ran from 1997 to 2015.

| Year | Nominee / work | Award | Result |
|---|---|---|---|
| 2005 | Anthony Callea | Channel V Oz Artist of the Year | Won |

=== Mo Awards ===
The Australian Entertainment Mo Awards (commonly known informally as the Mo Awards) were annual Australian entertainment industry awards. They recognise achievements in live entertainment in Australia from 1975 to 2016.

| Year | Nominee / work | Award | Result (wins only) | Ref. |
|---|---|---|---|---|
| 2004 | Anthony Callea | Contemporary Rock Performer of the Year | Won | |
