= Anthony Callea (album) =

Studio album by Anthony Callea
- Released: 25 March 2005
- Recorded: 2004–2005
- Genre: Pop
- Length: 49:09
- Label: Sony BMG
- Producer: John Foreman; Quiz & Larossi; Adam Reily; Bryon Jones; Paul L Wiltshire; Eric Sanicola; Peter Gordeno; Chris Porter

Anthony Callea chronology
| Anthony Callea (2005) | A New Chapter (2006) |

Singles from Anthony Callea
- 1. "The Prayer" Released: 19 December 2004; 2. "Rain / Bridge over Troubled Water" Released: 11 March 2005; 3. "Hurts So Bad" Released: 10 July 2005; 4. "Per Sempre (for Always)" Released: 7 October 2005

Anthony Callea is the debut album of Anthony Callea. It was released on 25 March 2005. The album debuted at number one on the ARIA Albums Chart on the week of 4 April 2005. It held the top spot on the chart for three weeks before dropping to number three. The album was certified double platinum by ARIA.

The first single, "The Prayer", was released in December 2004 and debuted on the ARIA Singles Chart at number one, remaining at the top spot for five weeks straight. It was certified four times Platinum, selling in excess of 280,000 copies and was the highest-selling single in Australia in 2005. In 2010 ARIA named it the second-highest selling single of the previous decade, which also made it the second-highest selling Australian artist song of that decade. His second single was the double A-side "Rain"/"Bridge over Troubled Water" released the week before Easter, which also debuted at number one and held the spot for two weeks. Callea's third single "Hurts So Bad" debuted at number ten on the ARIA Charts. The fourth single released from Anthony Callea—"Per Sempre (for Always)"—made its debut at number five on the ARIA Charts. It was released in two formats—as a standard CD single and a DVD single.

== Track listing ==
Anthony Callea track listing
| No. | Title | Writer(s) | Length |
|---|---|---|---|
| 1. | "The Prayer" (Celine Dion and Andrea Bocelli cover) | Carole Bayer Sager, David Foster | 4:15 |
| 2. | "Rain" | Savan Kotecha, Andreas Romdhane, Josef Larossi | 3:48 |
| 3. | "Hurts So Bad" | Eric Sanicola, Jim Dyke, Marc Nelkin | 3:05 |
| 4. | "When I Get There" | Louise Perryman, Vince Pizzinga | 4:02 |
| 5. | "Obvious" (Westlife cover) | Carl Björsell, Andreas Carlsson, Carl Falk, Kotecha, Didrik Thott, Sebastian Thott | 3:39 |
| 6. | "Per Sempre (For Always)" | Steve Balsamo, Ben Robbins | 3:52 |
| 7. | "Lost in Summer" | Chris Porter, Peter Gordeno | 3:32 |
| 8. | "I Want You" | Ashley Cadell, Rebecca Caruana, Adam Reily, John Collins | 4:19 |
| 9. | "When You Were My Girl" | Reily | 4:32 |
| 10. | "Take It to the Heart" | Romdhane, Larossi, David Kopatz, Jack Kugell | 3:50 |
| 11. | "Into Your Heart" | Anthony Callea, Ashley Cadell, John Collins | 4:35 |
| 12. | "Bridge over Troubled Water" | Paul Simon | 3:57 |

Limited edition bonus disc
| No. | Title | Writer(s) | Length |
|---|---|---|---|
| 1. | "Listen with Your Heart" (CeCe Winans cover) | Diane Warren | 4:01 |
| 2. | "The Prayer" (Celine Dion and Andrea Bocelli cover; live version from Australian Idol Episode 8) | Bayer Sager, Foster | 4:15 |

== Charts ==
=== Weekly charts ===
Weekly chart performance for Anthony Callea
| Chart (2005) | Peak position |
|---|---|
| Australian Albums (ARIA) | 1 |

=== Year-end charts ===
Year-end chart performance for Anthony Callea
| Chart (2005) | Position |
|---|---|
| Australian Albums (ARIA) | 17 |

== Certifications ==
Certifications for Anthony Callea
| Region | Certification | Certified units/sales |
|---|---|---|
| Australia (ARIA) | 2× Platinum | 140,000^{^} |
^{^} Shipments figures based on certification alone.
