= Per sempre (For Always) =

"Per Sempre (For Always)"

Single by Anthony Callea

from the album Anthony Callea
- Released: 7 October 2005
- Recorded: 2004
- Genre: Pop
- Label: Sony BMG
- Songwriter(s): Steve Balsamo, Ben Robbins, Anthony Callea

Anthony Callea singles chronology
"Hurts So Bad" (2005)	"Per Sempre (For Always)" (2005)	"Live for Love" (2006)

Music video
- "Per Sempre (For Always)" on YouTube

"Per Sempre (For Always)" is the fourth and final single by Anthony Callea from his self-titled debut album Anthony Callea.

== Track listing ==
CD single

1. "Per Sempre (For Always)"
2. "Per Sempre (For Always)" (live)
3. "Don't Tell Me" (live)

DVD single

1. "Per Sempre (For Always)" (live)
2. "Per Sempre (For Always)" (video)
3. "Per Sempre (For Always)" (album version audio)

== Charts ==
Chart (2005)	Peak position
Australia (ARIA)	5
