= The Prayer (Celine Dion and Andrea Bocelli song) =

1999 single by Céline Dion and Andrea Bocelli

Promotional single by Celine Dion and Andrea Bocelli

from the album These Are Special Times
- Released: March 1999
- Recorded: 1998
- Studio: Chartmarker; Sony Sound Stage; Criteria Recording
- Genre: Operatic pop
- Length: 4:29
- Label: Columbia; Epic
- Songwriters: David Foster; Carole Bayer Sager; Tony Renis; Alberto Testa
- Producers: David Foster; Carole Bayer Sager; Tony Renis

Audio
- "The Prayer" on YouTube

"The Prayer" is a song recorded by Canadian singer Celine Dion and Italian tenor Andrea Bocelli. Written by David Foster and Carole Bayer Sager, with Italian lyrics adapted by Alberto Testa and Tony Renis, the track was produced by Foster, with Sager and Renis serving as co‑producers.

"The Prayer" was first recorded in two solo versions for the Warner Bros. 1998 animated musical Quest for Camelot, with Dion performing the English version and Bocelli the Italian version. A duet by Dion and Bocelli was later included on their respective albums, These Are Special Times (1998) and Sogno (1999), and was issued as a promotional single in March 1999. The song won the Golden Globe Award for Best Original Song and received nominations for the Academy Award for Best Original Song in 1999 and the Grammy Award for Best Pop Collaboration with Vocals in 2000. It was met with positive reviews from music critics and entered adult contemporary charts in Canada and the United States in 1999.

In 2008, Dion released a live version of "The Prayer" as a duet with Josh Groban. The single entered the Canadian Hot 100 at number 37 and the Billboard Hot 100 at number 70.

== History ==
"The Prayer" was originally recorded as two separate solo versions, with Dion performing the English lyrics and Bocelli the Italian lyrics. Both appeared on the Quest for Camelot soundtrack in May 1998. A duet by the two artists followed later that year on their respective albums, These Are Special Times and Sogno.

The song was later included on Dion's compilation The Collector's Series, Volume One (2000) and on her greatest hits album My Love: Ultimate Essential Collection (2008). Dion also recorded a solo reinterpretation, "A Mother's Prayer", for her 2004 album Miracle.

During the Taking Chances World Tour, Dion performed "The Prayer" as a virtual duet with Bocelli projected on screen; this rendition was released on the Taking Chances World Tour: The Concert CD/DVD. The duet also appeared on Bocelli's 2007 compilation The Best of Andrea Bocelli: Vivere. In 2011, Dion joined Bocelli to perform the song live during his Concerto: One Night in Central Park concert, later released on CD and DVD.

Both artists have since performed "The Prayer" with other partners, and numerous singers have recorded duet or solo interpretations. Over time, the song has become a popular choice for Christmas concerts, weddings, funerals, and religious services.

== Critical reception ==
Paul Verna of Billboard described the song as a "gorgeous duet". Chuck Taylor of Billboard called "The Prayer" "a breathtaking, ultra‑lush song" and praised the pairing of Dion and Bocelli, writing that their performance "will send a half‑dozen chills up your spine". Although he considered it "an unorthodox track for the radio", Taylor described the recording as "affecting", "heartwarming", "absolutely exquisite", and "one of Dion's most radiant performances ever".

== Commercial performance ==
Because "The Prayer" was issued only as a promotional single, it charted exclusively on adult contemporary formats. It entered the Canadian and US adult contemporary charts in March 1999, peaking at number six on RPM's Canadian Adult Contemporary chart and number 22 on Billboard's US Adult Contemporary chart. On ADISQ's Quebec Radio Songs chart, it reached number 18. In Belgium, it appeared on the Ultratop Airplay charts in 1999, peaking at number 34 in Wallonia and number 162 in Flanders.

In the digital and streaming era, "The Prayer" returned to several charts. In 2010, it entered Billboard's Holiday/Seasonal Digital Songs and Classical Digital Songs rankings, reaching number one on both. In 2017, it entered the Swedish charts at number 54. In 2020, it charted in the United Kingdom, reaching number 62 in Scotland and number 67 on the UK Singles Downloads Chart. In 2023, it was certified gold in New Zealand.

== Accolades ==
At the 56th Golden Globes in January 1999, "The Prayer" won the Golden Globe Award for Best Original Song for its use in the 1998 film Quest for Camelot, marking the second consecutive Golden Globe win for a Celine Dion recording. In the film, Dion performed a solo English version with slightly altered lyrics. The song was also nominated for an Academy Award for Best Original Song at the 71st Academy Awards and for a Grammy Award for Best Pop Collaboration with Vocals at the 42nd Annual Grammy Awards. Dion and Bocelli performed the duet together in February 1999 at the 41st Annual Grammy Awards and again in March 1999 at the 71st Academy Awards.

== Personnel ==
- Celine Dion – lead vocals
- Andrea Bocelli – lead vocals
- David Foster – composer, keyboards, piano, arranger, producer
- Carole Bayer Sager – lyricist, producer
- Tony Renis – composer, producer
- Alberto Testa – lyricist
- William Ross – arranger, orchestral arrangements
- Humberto Gatica – engineer, mixing
- Felipe Elgueta – engineer, programming

== Charts ==
=== Weekly charts ===
1999 weekly chart performance
| Chart (1999) | Peak position |
|---|---|
| Belgium (Ultratop Airplay Flanders) | 162 |
| Belgium (Ultratop Airplay Wallonia) | 34 |
| Canada Adult Contemporary (RPM) | 6 |
| Quebec Radio Songs (ADISQ) | 18 |
| US Adult Contemporary (Billboard) | 22 |

2010–2020 weekly chart performance
| Chart (2010–2020) | Peak position |
|---|---|
| Scottish Singles Sales (Official Charts) | 62 |
| Sweden (Sverigetopplistan) | 54 |
| UK Singles Downloads (Official Charts) | 67 |
| US Classical Digital Songs (Billboard) | 1 |
| US Holiday/Seasonal Digital Songs (Billboard) | 1 |

=== Year-end charts ===
Year-end chart performance
| Chart (1999) | Position |
|---|---|
| Canada Adult Contemporary (RPM) | 48 |

== Certifications ==
Certifications
| Region | Certification | Certified units/sales |
|---|---|---|
| New Zealand (RMNZ) | Gold | 15,000^{‡} |
^{‡} Sales+streaming figures based on certification alone.

== Anthony Callea version ==
"The Prayer"

Single by Anthony Callea

from the album Anthony Callea
- B-side: "The Prayer" (Sterling remix)
- Released: 19 December 2004
- Genre: Classical crossover
- Length: 4:16
- Label: Sony BMG
- Songwriters: David Foster; Carole Bayer Sager; Tony Renis; Alberto Testa
- Producer: John Forman

Anthony Callea singles chronology
| "The Prayer" (2004) | "Rain" / "Bridge over Troubled Water" (2005) |

Music video
- "The Prayer" on YouTube

Anthony Callea first performed "The Prayer" during Australian Idol in 2004, in the week of "contestants choice". He received a standing ovation for the performance and the "Grand Royal Touchdown" from judge Mark Holden. Callea finished as the runner‑up of the season.

After the show, Callea signed with Sony BMG and released "The Prayer" as his debut single.

Issued in Australia on 19 December 2004, the single debuted at number one on the ARIA Charts, where it remained for five weeks. It was certified four times platinum by the ARIA and became the fastest‑selling single by an Australian artist, as well as the second‑highest‑selling single of the 2000s in Australia overall and for an Australian performer. The song was included on Callea's debut album Anthony Callea. The music video, released in 2004, includes footage of Callea recording the track.

Callea has performed "The Prayer" at numerous concerts, including Carols by Candlelight in Melbourne. In 2006, he performed it for Queen Elizabeth II at a Commonwealth Day Service. He also performed it as a duet with Tina Arena on her Symphony of Life CD/DVD, released in 2012.

=== Formats and track listing ===
- Australian CD single
1. "The Prayer" – 4:16
2. "The Prayer" (Sterling remix) – 4:03

=== Charts ===
==== Weekly charts ====
Weekly chart performance
| Chart (2004) | Peak position |
|---|---|
| Australia (ARIA) | 1 |

==== Year-end charts ====
2004 year-end chart performance
| Chart (2004) | Position |
|---|---|
| Australia (ARIA) | 82 |

2005 year-end chart performance
| Chart (2005) | Position |
|---|---|
| Australia (ARIA) | 1 |

==== Decade-end charts ====
Decade-end chart performance
| Chart (2000–2009) | Position |
|---|---|
| Australia (ARIA) | 2 |

=== Certifications ===
Certifications
| Region | Certification | Certified units/sales |
|---|---|---|
| Australia (ARIA) | 4× Platinum | 280,000^{^} |
^{^} Shipments figures based on certification alone.

== Celine Dion and Josh Groban version ==
"The Prayer (live)"

Single by Celine Dion and Josh Groban
- Released: 12 February 2008
- Recorded: 12 January 2008
- Venue: Wiltern Theatre (Los Angeles)
- Genre: Classical crossover
- Length: 4:38
- Label: Sony BMG
- Songwriters: David Foster; Carole Bayer Sager; Tony Renis; Alberto Testa

Celine Dion singles chronology
| "A World to Believe In" (2008) | "The Prayer (live)" (2008) | "Alone" (2008) |

Audio
- "The Prayer" on YouTube

Celine Dion first performed "The Prayer" with Josh Groban in 1999, when the then 17‑year‑old Groban filled in for Andrea Bocelli during rehearsal for the 41st Annual Grammy Awards. They reunited nine years later on her CBS television special That's Just the Woman in Me, which aired on 15 February 2008. This performance was released as a digital download in the United States and Canada two days earlier.

=== Commercial performance ===
Because the original duet was issued only as a promotional single, it did not appear on commercial charts. The 2008 live version, released digitally, generated measurable chart activity. It entered the Billboard Hot 100 at number 70, becoming Groban's highest‑charting solo entry (both artists later reached number two as part of Artists for Haiti with "We Are the World 25 for Haiti" in 2010). The 2008 version also appeared on several other Billboard charts: Pop 100 at number 50, Hot Digital Songs at number 32, and Hot Digital Tracks at number 29. It sold 37,531 copies in its first week in the US. In Canada, it peaked at number 37 on the Canadian Hot 100 and number 19 on the Canadian Top Digital Downloads.

=== Charts ===
Chart performance
| Chart (2008) | Peak position |
|---|---|
| Canada Hot 100 (Billboard) | 37 |
| US Billboard Hot 100 | 70 |
| US Pop 100 (Billboard) | 50 |
