= Damien Leith discography =

Australian-Irish singer and songwriter

- Studio albums: 10
- EPs: 2
- Live albums: 1
- Singles: 27

The discography of Damien Leith, an Australian singer-songwriter, consists of ten studio albums, one live album, two EPs and 27 singles.

Leith won the fourth series of Australian Idol in 2006, and signed a record deal with Sony BMG and has also released albums via Social Family Records and Ambition Records.

== Albums ==
=== Studio albums ===
List of albums, with selected chart positions and certifications
Title	Album details	Peak chart positions		Certifications
Title	Album details	AUS	IRE	Certifications
Where We Land	Released: 18 August 2007; Format: CD, digital download; Label: Sony Music Australia	1	43	ARIA: Platinum
Catch the Wind: Songs of a Generation	Released: 26 April 2008; Format: CD, digital download; Label: Sony Music Australia	2	—	ARIA: Gold
Remember June	Released: 9 October 2009; Format: CD, digital download; Label: Sony Music Australia	25	—	
Roy: A Tribute to Roy Orbison	Released: 15 April 2011; Format: CD, digital download; Label: Sony Music Australia	2	—	ARIA: Platinum
Now & Then	Released: 20 April 2012; Format: CD, digital download; Label: Sony Music Australia	12	—	
Chapter Seven	Released: 1 November 2013; Format: CD, digital download; Label: Social Family Records	57	—	
Songs from Ireland	Released: 13 March 2015; Format: CD, digital download; Label: Sony Music Australia	11	—	
Gospel	Released: 3 August 2018; Format: CD, digital download, streaming; Label: Damien Leith, Ambition (FANFARE311)	—	—	
Two of Us: Songs of Lennon & Mccartney (with Darren Coggen)	Released: 13 November 2020; Format: CD, digital download, streaming; Label: Damien Leith, Ambition (AMBITION117)	—	—	
Roy Orbison Orchestrated	Released: 3 November 2023; Format: CD, digital download, streaming; Label: ABC Music (ABCM0019)	—	—	

=== Live albums ===
List of albums, with selected chart positions and certifications
Title	Album details	Peak chart positions	Certifications
Title	Album details	AUS	Certifications
The Winner's Journey	Released: 9 December 2006; Format: CD, digital download; Label: Sony Music Australia	1	ARIA: 4× Platinum

== Extended plays ==
List of albums, with selected details
Title	EP details
It's Christmas Time	Released: 20 November 2014; Format: Digital download; Label: Leithal Enterprises
Damien Leith Storytime	Released: 28 February 2018; Format: Digital download; Label: Damien Leith

== Singles ==
List of singles, with selected chart positions
Year	Title	Peak chart positions		Certifications	Album
Year	Title	AUS	IRE	Certifications	Album
2006	"Night of My Life"	1	8	ARIA: Platinum	The Winner's Journey
2007	"22 Steps"	11	—		Where We Land
2009	"To Get to You"	—	—		Remember June
2010	"Forgive Forget"	65	—		Remember June
2011	"Blue Bayou" (featuring The McClymonts)	—	—		Roy: A Tribute to Roy Orbison
2011	"When a Child Is Born" (with Tommy Emmanuel)	—	—		single only
2012	"Beautiful"	—	—		Now & Then
2012	"Run" (featuring Diana Rouvas)	—	—		Now & Then
2013	"Without a Fight"	—	—		Chapter Seven
2014	"Halfway Heart"	—	—		Chapter Seven
2014	"You and I"	—	—		Chapter Seven
2014	"Someone Like You"	—	—		singles only
2014	"One and Only Mum"	—	—		singles only
2014	"Last Goodbye/Fields of Gold/Girl Back on Blue Bayou" (with Joe Melson)	—	—		singles only
2015	"Christmas Time with You"	—	—		singles only
2018	"I Don't Wanna Be"	—	—		singles only
2018	"The Moment Just Before"	—	—		singles only
2019	"Fight for Your Love"	—	—		singles only
2020	"Sha La La"	—	—		singles only
2021	"Time Machine"	—	—		singles only
2022	"Superhuman"	—	—		singles only
2023	"At 21 (New Years Eve)"	—	—		singles only
2023	"Shake Those Jingle Bells"	—	—		singles only
2024	"Isle of Hope, Isle of Tears" (with Suellen Cusack)	—	—		The Irish Songbook
2025	"These Days"	—	—		singles only
2025	"Silent Night" (with Suellen Cusack)	—	—		singles only
2026	"Heart Love"	—	—		singles only
"—" denotes releases that did not chart.
