= Where We Land =

Studio album by Damien Leith
- Released: 18 August 2007 (Australia); 28 September. 2007 (Ireland)
- Recorded: 2007
- Studio: Sony BMG Music Studios (Sydney)
- Genres: Pop rock, alternative rock, acoustic rock
- Length: 45:11
- Label: Sony BMG Australia
- Producer: James Roche

Damien Leith chronology
The Winner's Journey (2006)	Where We Land (2007)	Catch the Wind: Songs of a Generation (2008)

Alternative cover
- Christmas edition CD cover

Singles from Where We Land
- 1. "22 Steps" Released: 21 July 2007; 2. "All I Want Is You" Released: non-commercial release 3. "Not Just for the Weekend" Released: non-commercial release

Where We Land is the first studio album by Australian Idol 2006 winner Damien Leith. It was released by Sony BMG in Australia on 18 August 2007, and in Ireland on 28 September 2007. Leith produced the album for seven months and created the album entirely with acoustic songs. He wrote or co-wrote nine of the twelve songs, collaborating with Alex Lloyd and his music director Paul Gray (Wa Wa Nee) in a few songs. All of his original songs were inspired by his friends and family. Leith included two cover songs in the album, Fleetwood Mac's "Songbird" from the album Rumours and the traditional Irish song "Danny Boy". Where We Land received mostly average reviews from critics. It debuted in the Australian Albums Chart at number-one and was certified platinum by the Australian Recording Industry Association. The album spawned the singles "22 Steps", "All I Want Is You" and "Not Just for the Weekend". Leith embarked on a national tour across Australia to promote the album in November 2007.

== Background ==
Damien Leith stated how his debut studio album wanted to pan out: "I didn't really want to do anybody else's songs... I just wanted this album to be mine". Immediately after Australian Idol concluded, he convinced the producers of the show to break from protocol by giving him longer time to record the album. The protocol was that the Australian Idol winners had only one week after the competition ended to record their first album. He decided to work on his first studio album for the next few months. Leith was aware of the little success of the previous two Idol winners, Casey Donovan and Kate DeAraugo, so he decided to turn something more palpable than the previous winners by producing an album of original songs. He comments, "I suppose the main thing for me was trying to establish myself as a songwriter out of it because that's something that hasn't really been promoted in the past." He was determined to create as much original material as possible for the album, and create songs that truly represent who he was. He also wanted the themes in the lyrics to not only be personal, but broad enough so that listeners can relate to them.

== Production and recording ==
Leith remarked that recording the album was an exciting but nerve-racking experience. He recorded his music at Sony BMG's recording studio in East Sydney. His producers already had in mind what kind of album they want to produce for Leith. He, however wanted his album to be totally acoustic. Knowing that he was well known by the Australian public as the new Australian Idol, he knew that it was risky to produce an acoustic based album because it was very different from the records produced by the previous Idol contestants, as many of their records predominantly featured up-beat pop songs. He noted that the music he was making could make the album harder to sell commercially.

As a result, he and his producers spent the time to work on the songs which would appeal to a broader audience. Leith did this by holding onto several elements in his music that people had enjoyed on Australian Idol. However, he still wanted to show new elements to the album, so he held on some elements of acoustic music. Leith comments,

"We didn't want to be too acoustic, or too rocky. I've been conscious of the people who bought The Winner's Journey, but also conscious about grabbing a new audience as well... I think this album's got all those kind of Winner's Journey elements – the falsetto and the emotional thing. But it's got a lot of me in it too."

Damien Leith was also conscious of the lyrics we wrote. He added a few emotional ballads which contained strong lyrics, but had left out the songs he thought were too depressing.

Leith spent seven months of recording and writing and worked with Bryon Jones, James Roche and Ross Fraser. Initially, he wanted the album to be released in March, but it was pushed back to August, partly due to the prolonged success of The Winner's Journey and partly because of the large number of songs they had to cull.

== Writing and inspiration ==
The songs he wrote were inspired by his family and friends. A few of the songs explored the themes of love and fulfilment. "Not Just for the Weekend" was a song he wrote after the birth of his second son, Jagger. The song "Beautiful" is a love song written to his wife Eileen. Other songs in the album explored much darker themes. "Blew It All Away" is a heartfelt song about the suicide of a friend, which happened shortly after another friend died from cancer. Another song, "Alone" was inspired from a friend who was struggling after his father's death. "Shine Like the Sun" is about a friend in Ireland who was experiencing a rough relationship.

Leith wrote or co-wrote a total of nine tracks out of the twelve in the album. Incidentally, the first single and the opening track "22 Steps" was a song he did not write; it was written by Canadian singer-songwriter Andy Stochansky. Another non-original track Leith recorded was a cover of Fleetwood Mac's "Songbird" from their album Rumours. This song holds special meaning for Leith, as his sister sang this song during his and Eileen's wedding. Leith collaborated with Australian writers in a few songs, including Alex Lloyd who co-wrote with Leith the songs "Beautiful" and "Blew It All Away". They also wrote four other songs which they did not include in the album because they were too alternative. His musical director Paul Gray of Wa Wa Nee co-wrote the track "Alone". He left out his debut single "Night of My Life", originally written for his win on Idol, because he could not relate to the lyrics in his everyday life, only within the context of the show. Sony BMG added a raw bonus track, the traditional Irish song "Danny Boy" which Leith did a one-take recording of for a fan. Initially, Leith was hesitant to include it in the album because it was so raw.

Damien Leith chose to name the album Where We Land as it described all the things that happened to him in the past year individually and professionally, and also illustrated his journey to Australia in various ways.

== Album and single releases ==
Where We Land was officially released on 18 August 2007 in Australia. Beforehand, the first single of the album, "22 Steps" was released to Australian radio on 22 June 2007, with a physical release on 21 July. Another track also included in Where We Land was "I Still Miss Us", which was a bonus track with the release of "22 Steps" only available in the Australian iTunes Store. The music video for "22 Steps" premiered on rage on 22 June. The second single, "All I Want Is You", was released as a non-commercial single; its music video debuted on rage on 19 October.

Where We Land was later released in Ireland on 28 September 2007. On 17 November 2007, a limited special Christmas edition of Where We Land was released in Australia which included a second disc with five bonus tracks, including an original track "This Christmas".

== Chart performance ==
In the week beginning on 27 August 2007, Where We Land debuted on the ARIA Albums Chart at number one. The album was certified gold status in its first week of release and sold 12,760 copies, 4,939 more than the second highest selling album of the week, which was The Dutchess by Fergie. This feat follows his previous live album The Winner's Journey which was at number-one earlier in the year in January. He is also the first Australian Idol winner to achieve two consecutive number-one albums. The album dropped to number-two in its second week on the charts, replaced by Paul Potts' One Chance. In its third week, Where We Land it was certified platinum status and moved down to number-four. It dropped outside the top ten in the following week on the Australian charts.

Where We Land debuted on the Irish Albums Chart at number 43 on the week after its release in Ireland, remaining in the Top 75 for a second week, before falling off the chart the week after.

== Critical reception ==
Professional ratings
Review scores
Source	Rating
AllMusic	3/5 stars

Responses from critics have given mostly average reviews of the album. Polly Coufos from The Sunday Times considers Damien Leith as "the most complete artist Australian Idol has yet uncovered". Coufos rated the album 3.5 stars, and comments that "Leith uses that heavenly falsetto as often as possible without making himself appear a one-trick pony". Coufos, however says that the two cover songs, "Songbird" and "Danny Boy" are an "unnecessary hedging of bets". Andrew Murfett from The Age notices the album's different arrangement from the previous Idol debuts and considers it to be better than those, but says that the album still contains too many ballad songs. Murfett remarks "Songbird" as a good choice for a cover song. Lauren Katulka from 'Oz Music Scene' compliments Leith's songwriting and composing, and says that Where We Land "is a great indication of the potential of Australia's revamped Idol franchise". Lucy Tyler from the Sydney Anglican Network says that though the album is well-produced; it is unbalanced and bland, and "its lack of variety means that it gives listeners little to think about". Tyler notes that Where We Land focuses on the melancholic aspects of life and remarks that "Leith appears to have forgotten that life can sometimes be happy, too".

== Promotion ==
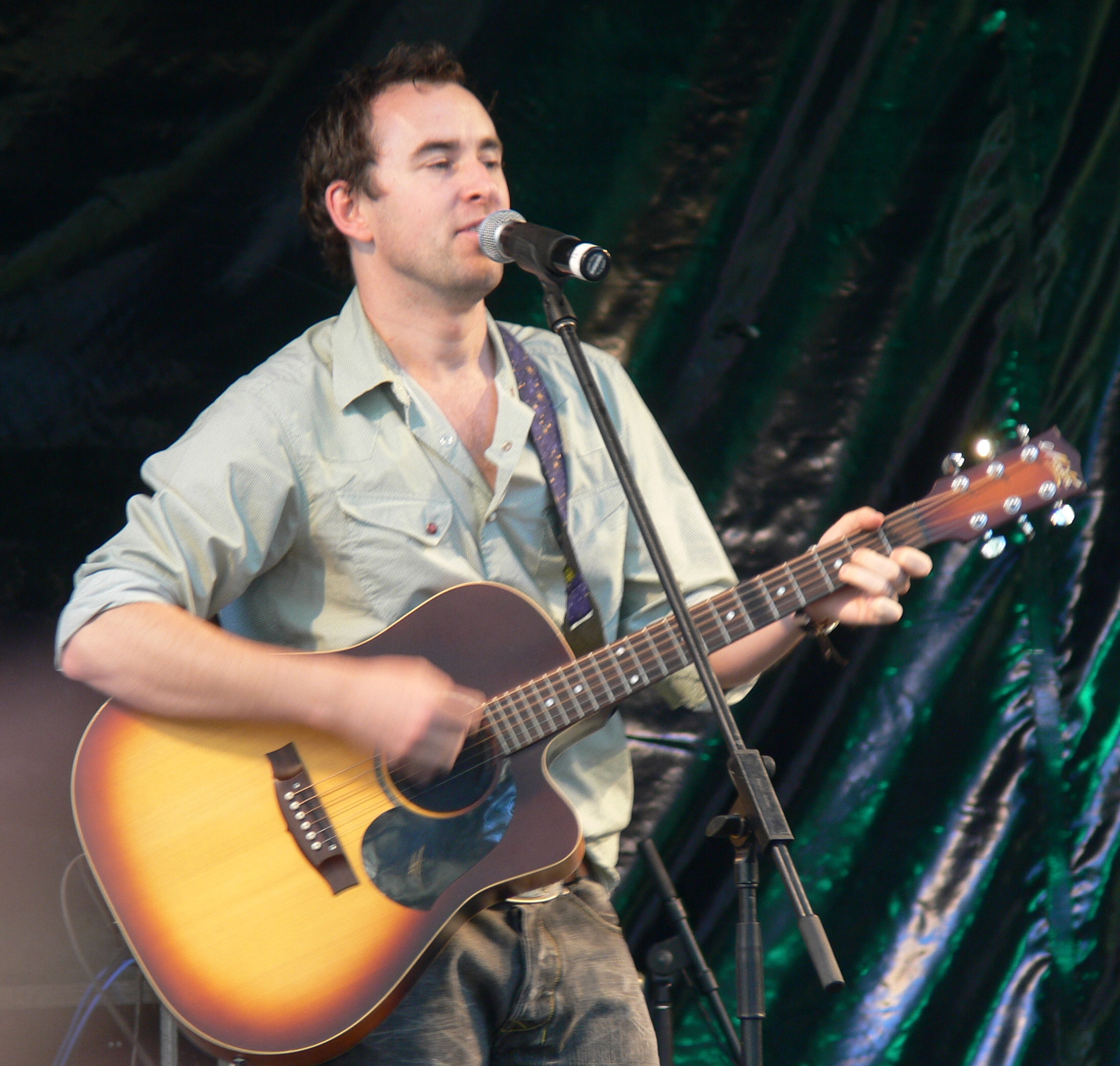
Leith performing on Saint Patrick's Day 2007

Damien Leith made several appearances in the week after Where We Land was released. On 19 August 2007, Leith performed songs from the album at the Warringah Mall Center Stage in Brookvale, and on 23 August, he performed songs at the Robina Town Centre in Robina, Queensland. He made a guest appearance on 26 August on Rove and performed live on 30 August on Australian Idol. He again made a special guest appearance on Australian Idol on 7 October, singing "All I Want Is You".

Leith is currently embarking on a national Where We Land tour across Australia from 1 to 24 November 2007, touring in various venues located specifically in Sydney, Canberra, Brisbane, Melbourne, the Central Coast, Newcastle, Wollongong and Hobart. He is performing the tracks from the album as well as several of his classic performances from Australian Idol. It was announced on 28 September that the tour was extended to include the other major cities of Australia; Adelaide and Perth.

== Track listing ==
1. "22 Steps" (Andy Stochansky, Ian LeFeuvre) – 3:35
2. "All I Want Is You" (Damien Leith) – 3:16
3. "Beautiful" (Leith, Alex Wasiliev); 3:43
4. "Shine Like the Sun" (Leith) – 4:10
5. "I Still Miss Us" (Leith, Bryon Jones) – 4:17
6. "The Long Way Back" (Leith) – 3:30
7. "Not Just for the Weekend" (Leith) – 3:48
8. "Songbird" (cover version) (Christine McVie) – 4:17
9. "Blew It All Away" (Leith, Wasiliev) – 3:21
10. "Alone" (Leith, Paul Gray) – 3:51
11. "Cold Cold Heart" (Leith) – 3:52
12. "Danny Boy" (Bonus Track) (cover version) (Frederic Weatherly) – 3:31

Christmas edition bonus tracks

1. "I'll Be Home for Christmas" (Buck Ram, Kim Gannon, Walter Kent) – 3:13
2. "The Christmas Song" (Mel Tormé, Robert Wells) – 3:21
3. "This Christmas" (Damien Leith, Eileen Stapleton) – 3:35
4. "O Holy Night" (Adolphe Adam) – 2:44
5. "Silent Night" (Josef Mohr) – 2:09

B-sides from singles

1. "Who You Are" ("22 Steps")
2. "Song for Jarvis" ("22 Steps")
3. "Come to Me" ("Night of My Life")
4. "Sky" (The Winner's Journey)

== Personnel ==
- Damien Leith – vocals, guitar, arranger
- Matt Cornell – bass
- Dave Leslie – guitar
- James Roche – bass, piano, strings, keyboards, programmer, producer, mixer
- Irwin Thomas – guitar
- David Champion – manager
- Daniel Clinch – engineer
- James Cooper – art director, designer, photographer, illustrator
- Ross Fraser – A&R
- Amy Kelly – design producer & illustrator
- Christopher Morris – photographer
- Martin Pullan – mastering engineer

== Charts and certification ==
=== Weekly charts ===
Chart (2007)	Peak position
Australian Albums (ARIA)	1

=== Certification ===
Region	Certification	Certified units/sales
Australia (ARIA)	Platinum	70,000^{^}
^{^} Shipments figures based on certification alone.

=== Year-end charts ===
Chart (2007)	Position
Australian Albums Chart	39
Australian Artists Albums Chart	12
