= Mark Wilkinson (singer) =

Australian singer-songwriter

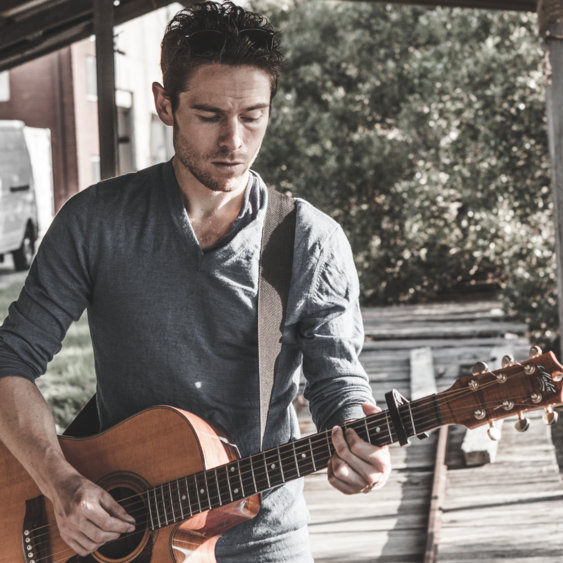
- Mark Wilkinson recording a music video in south Sydney, Australia, 2013.

Background information
- Birth name: Mark Edward Wilkinson
- Born: Buckinghamshire, England
- Origin: Sydney, Australia
- Genres: Acoustic, folk, alternative rock, pop
- Occupation: Singer-songwriter
- Instrument(s): Guitar, vocals
- Years active: 2005–present
- Website: markwilkinsonmusic.com

Mark Edward Wilkinson is an English-Australian singer-songwriter.

== Early life ==
Wilkinson was born in England, but his family later emigrated to Singapore and then to Australia when he was four years old. He attended Sydney Grammar School and went on to complete a Bachelor of Arts/Commerce degree at the University of Sydney. While in university, Wilkinson learned how to play the acoustic guitar.

== Career ==
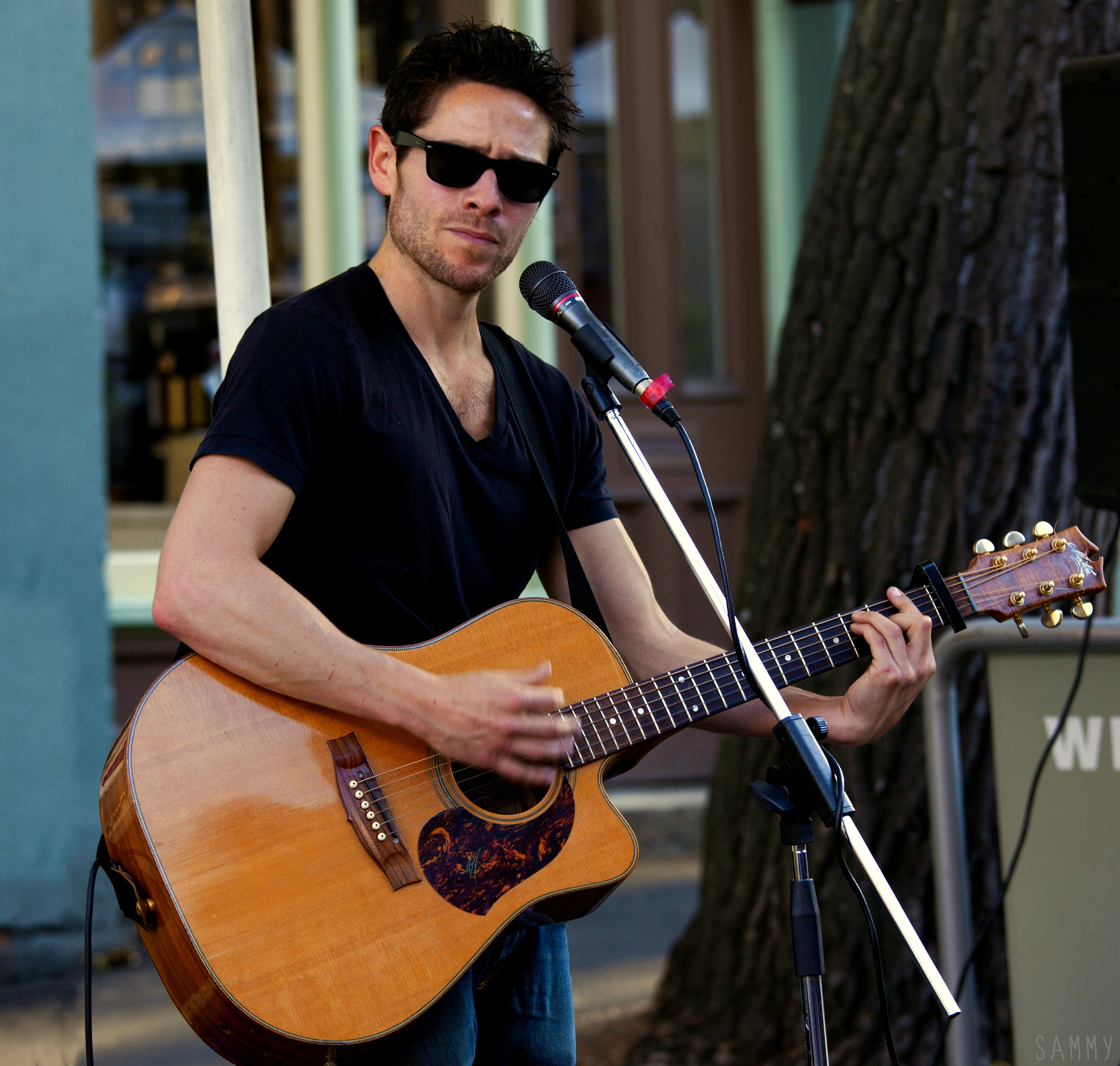

In 2006, Wilkinson independently released his six-track debut EP, Cellophane Life. The title track, along with "Baptism By Fire," elevated Mark to the finalist stage in Commercial Radio Australia's coveted New Artist To Radio competition.

Following on, in 2007, Wilkinson hit the road with the then current Australian Idol winner Damien Leith, performing to thousands across the country. Shortly after, he caught the attention of Peer Music, the world's largest independent music publisher, and subsequently signed an international contract.

In early 2008, Wilkinson set out on the road again, headlining shows along the east coast of Australia. He then set off to Europe for two months, performing across Ireland, England, France, and Germany; teaming up with songwriter Adam Argyle (Melanie C, Newton Faulkner, Wes Carr); and working with David Gray's team in his London studio. The success of his European tour led to Wilkinson's invitation to the Popkomm conference in Berlin, where he spoke to industry representatives from around the globe.

Wilkinson returned to Australia to finish his follow-up EP, Counting Down the Hours, which was more thoroughly produced. The title track, along with "Keep Fighting," once again placed him as a finalist in the New Artist to Radio competition, with Wilkinson going on to receive airplay on various commercial and community stations across the country.

In early 2009, Wilkinson was invited to perform for deployed Australian troops serving in the Solomon Islands. In an effort to make more of his music publicly available, Wilkinson launched a campaign called 'A Year of YouTube' beginning in April, the premise of the campaign being to release an original song each week over the course of a year. His relationship was solidified with Sydney residencies, where Wilkinson performed week after week, followed by a national tour supporting Diesel.

2010 launched in similar fashion, with Wilkinson touring Australia supporting Michael Bolton. This quickly followed up with more tours alongside Ian Moss (Cold Chisel), Jon Stevens (Noiseworks), and Shannon Noll, before heading to China to represent Australia and perform at World Expo. Wilkinson then finished the year performing at arenas around the country alongside Brian Wilson, Chicago, America, and Peter Frampton.

Wilkinson returned to the studio to record his debut album Truth Came Running with producer Sean Carey, guitarist for the band Thirsty Merc. With its release in March 2011, Wilkinson returned to the road, while lead single "All I Ever Wanted" had been receiving radio and television play on stations across the country. The film clip for "All I Ever Wanted" was shot on the streets of Cape Town, South Africa by photographer Adrian Steirn and his 21 Icons Global Project team.

October 2011 marked the release of Wilkinson's third EP, Sweet White Lies. During 2011, Wilkinson also supported Boyce Avenue on their Australian tour, and performed for VIPs at Kings of Leon's show at Allphones Arena, Sydney.

In early 2012, Wilkinson released Live at the Basement, a live album recorded at The Basement (Sydney) during the A Friend on the Road tour. He returned to the road in March 2012 for his Caught in a Moment national tour. Shortly after this tour, Wilkinson released a solo acoustic album titled Hand Picked and performed a handful of shows in churches in Sydney and Melbourne.

Coinciding with the release of his single "Benny's on the Rooftop" from his then-forthcoming album Let the River Run, Wilkinson set off on his Benny's on the Rooftop Tour, performing at venues across the country. Wilkinson began pre-production for his second studio album in November 2012, working with producer Ollie McGill (The Cat Empire). The album was mastered at the Abby Lane Studios in London and distributed by MGM in Australia and New Zealand, with worldwide digital distribution.

=== Tours ===
Wilkinson previewed Let the River Run in April 2013 at five shows in Sydney, two shows in London, and shows in Berlin and Dublin. He kicked off a world tour in August 2013 to support the release, with shows across Australia and debut tour dates in the U.S.

In October 2015, Wilkinson returned to the U.S. for tour dates in San Francisco; Portland, Oregon; Boston; Atlanta; Nashville, Tennessee; and New York City for another showcase at CMJ. The following December, Wilkinson released Hand Picked Vol. 2, the second in his acoustic series, which debuted at No. 2 on iTunes singer-songwriter charts. Shortly after, in February 2016, Wilkinson released the EP Come with Me Tonight, a preview of his then-unreleased third studio album. Rolling Stone premiered the first official video for "Another Necklace" from Come with Me Tonight.

Wilkinson kicked off a world tour to support the album in May 2016 with dates across Australia, New Zealand, Europe, the UK, and the U.S. in September 2016, with dates in New York, Atlanta, Boston, and Nashville, including shows at venues such as the Bluebird Café.

Wilkinson has performed across Australia, New Zealand, Europe and the U.S. He has opened arena and major theatre tours nationally for artists including Eric Clapton, Peter Frampton, Brian Wilson, Chicago, America, and Seal, among others. He has performed for VIPs at Kings of Leon and Santana concerts, represented Australia at the World Expo in China, and entertained deployed troops in the Solomon Islands. Wilkinson has also headlined European tours, performing to capacity crowds in London, Paris, and Berlin.

In a review of Wilkinson's set during his 2013 world tour, The Music wrote, "His voice is supreme and crisp...Wilkinson is one of the rare artists whose vocals embody a kind of charisma that pulls you in and forces you to do the rarest thing in the world...feel."

== Discography ==
=== Albums ===
List of albums, with selected details
Title	Details
Truth Came Running	Released: 2011; Label: Mark Wilkinson (MW005)
Live at the Basement	Released: March 2012; Label: Mark Wilkinson (MW007)
Hand Picked	Released: July 2012; Label: Mark Wilkinson (MW008)
Let the River Run	Released: August 2013; Label: Mark Wilkinson (MW009)
Hand Picked Vol. 2	Released: December 2015; Label: Mark Wilkinson (MW010)
Wasted Hours	Released:February 2018; Label: Mark Wilkinson (MW014)
Blue Eyed Girls	Released: 2019; Label: Mark Wilkinson (MW015)

=== Extended plays ===
List of EPs, with selected details
Title	Details
Cellophane Life	Released: 2006; Label: Mark Wilkinson (MW001)
Counting Down the Hours	Released: 2008; Label: Mark Wilkinson (MW002)
Sweet White Lies	Released: October 2011; Label: Mark Wilkinson (MW006)
Come with Me Tonight	Released: 2016; Label: Mark Wilkinson (MW011)
Mariposa	Released: 9 December 2022; Label: Mark Wilkinson, Nettwerk
