= Five Star Motel =

Studio album by Andy Stochansky
- Released: 2002
- Genre: Rock
- Length: 44:50
- Label: RCA
- Producer: Tom Rothrock, Dennis Herring, Ian LeFeuvre

Andy Stochansky chronology
Radio Fusebox (2000)	Five Star Motel (2002)	100 (2005)

Five Star Motel is the third studio album by Andy Stochansky, and Stochansky's first major label release

== Track listing ==
No.	Title	Writer(s)	Length
1.	"Stutter"	Andy Stochansky, Ian LeFeuvre, L. Goldblatt	3:41
2.	"Paris"	Stochansky, LeFeuvre, Elton John, Bernie Taupin	3:48
3.	"Here nor There"	Stochansky, LeFeuvre	4:07
4.	"Wonderful (It's Superman)"	Stochansky, LeFeuvre, Chris Thomas-King, L. Whynot	3:10
5.	"22 Steps"	Stochansky, LeFeuvre	3:49
6.	"Clay Pigeon"	Stochansky, LeFeuvre, Whynot	3:15
7.	"One Day"	Stochansky, LeFeuvre, Alana Davis	3:25
8.	"Miss USA"	Stochansky, LeFeuvre, Jesse Davis, John Humphrey, Zac Maloy	3:47
9.	"Wedding Song"	Stochansky, LeFeuvre, A. Jones	3:33
10.	"Mavis Said..."	Stochansky, LeFeuvre, A. Lawryshyn	4:11
11.	"Everest"	Stochansky, LeFeuvre	3:32
12.	"Hymn"	Stochansky, LeFeuvre, R. Hall	4:32
Total length:			44:50

== Personnel ==
- Andy Stochansky - vocals, acoustic guitars, piano, cymbals, glockenspiel, tambourine, cello
- Ian LeFeuvre - acoustic, electric and slide guitars, guiro, Mellotron, drum loops, percussion, backing vocals
- Tom Beckham - glockenspiel, keyboards, Hammond organ, Wurlitzer, woodwinds, vibraphone
- Dennis Herring - guitars, keyboards
- Les Cooper - guitars, backing vocals
- Steve Kreklo - guitars
- Mark Hill, Alisdair Jones - bass
- Matt Chamberlain, Peter Von Althen - drums, percussion
- Chris Bartos - cello, violin, viola
- Davey Faragher - backing vocals
