= 100 (album) =

Studio album by Andy Stochansky
- Released: 2005
- Genre: Rock
- Length: 39:51
- Label: Linus Entertainment
- Producer: Johnny Rzeznik

Andy Stochansky chronology
| Five Star Motel (2002) | 100 (2005) |

100 is the fourth studio album by Andy Stochansky. It was produced by Goo Goo Dolls front-man Johnny Rzeznik.

== Track listing ==
1. "All The Things You Are" – 3:34
2. "Shine" – 3:32
3. "Best Years" – 3:20
4. "That Summer" – 3:43
5. "One Man Symphony" – 3:19
6. "House of Gold" – 3:13
7. "Loud" – 2:56
8. "Beautiful Thing" – 3:34
9. "America" – 2:58
10. "Rockstar" – 3:37
11. "Butterfly Song" – 2:30
12. "Wish" – 3:44
