= The Voice (Australian TV series) season 8 =

The Voice
- Season 8
- Promotional poster featuring coaches Sebastian, Goodrem, Rowland, and Boy George
- Hosted by: Sonia Kruger
- Coaches: Kelly Rowland; Guy Sebastian; Delta Goodrem; Boy George
- Winner: Diana Rouvas
- Winning coach: Boy George
- Runner-up: Daniel Shaw

Release
- Original network: Nine Network
- Original release: 19 May – 7 July 2019

Season chronology
- ← Previous; Season 7 Next → Season 9

The eighth season of The Voice began airing on 19 May 2019. Dubbed as the "All Stars" season, this season features a number of artists who had previously appeared on previous seasons of the show, as well as from The X Factor Australia and Australia's Got Talent. The coaching line-up consisted of returning coaches Delta Goodrem, Boy George, and Kelly Rowland, and new addition Guy Sebastian, replacing Joe Jonas.

Diana Rouvas from Team George won the competition on 7 July 2019, marking the first All-Star contestant to win, as well as Boy George's first and only victory as a coach.

== Coaches and hosts ==
Coaches and Host of The Voice Season 8

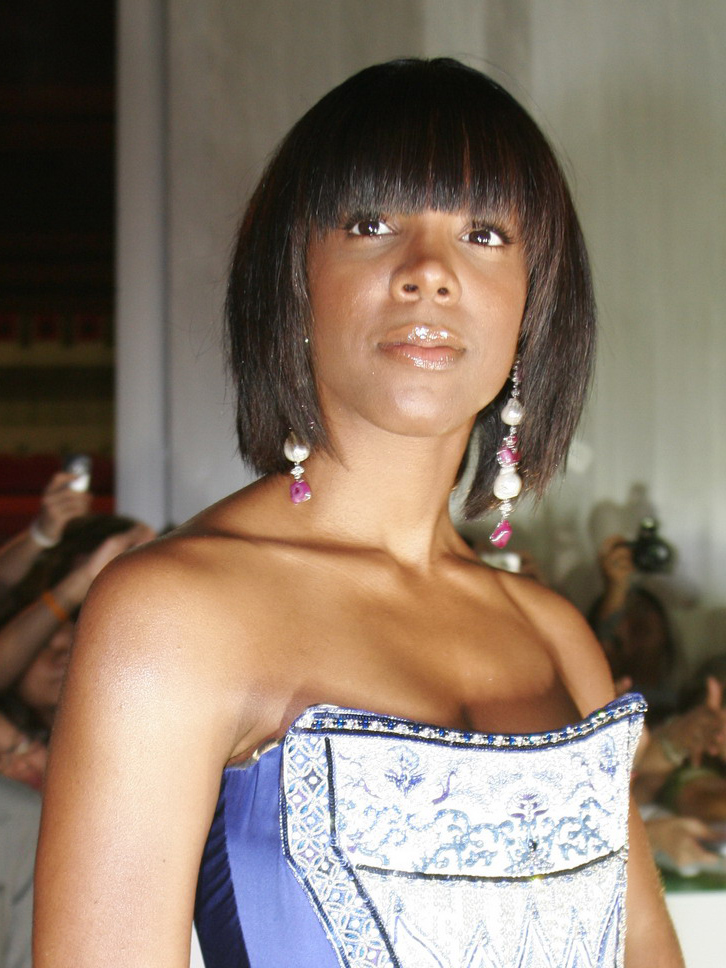
Kelly Rowland

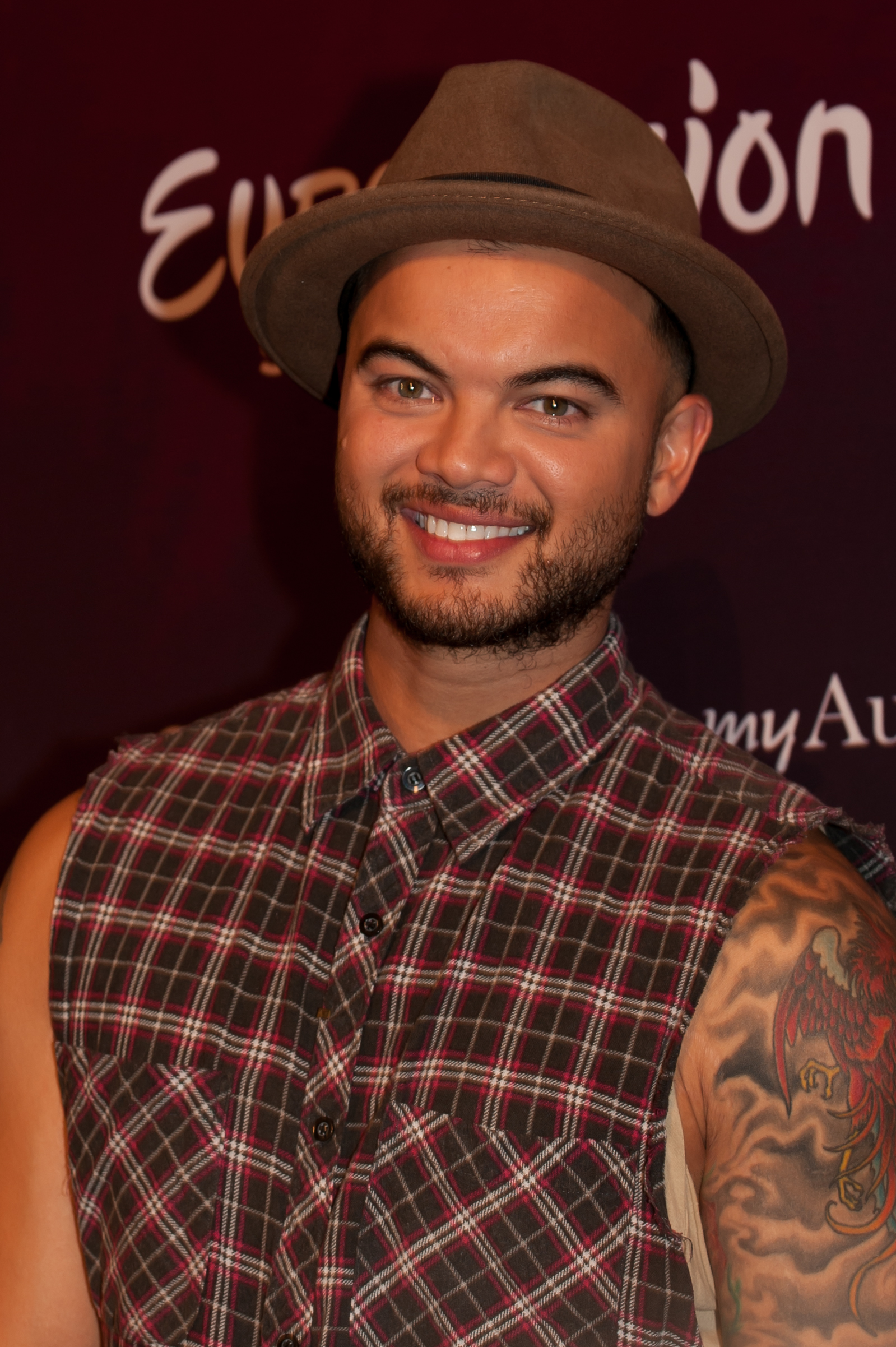
Guy Sebastian

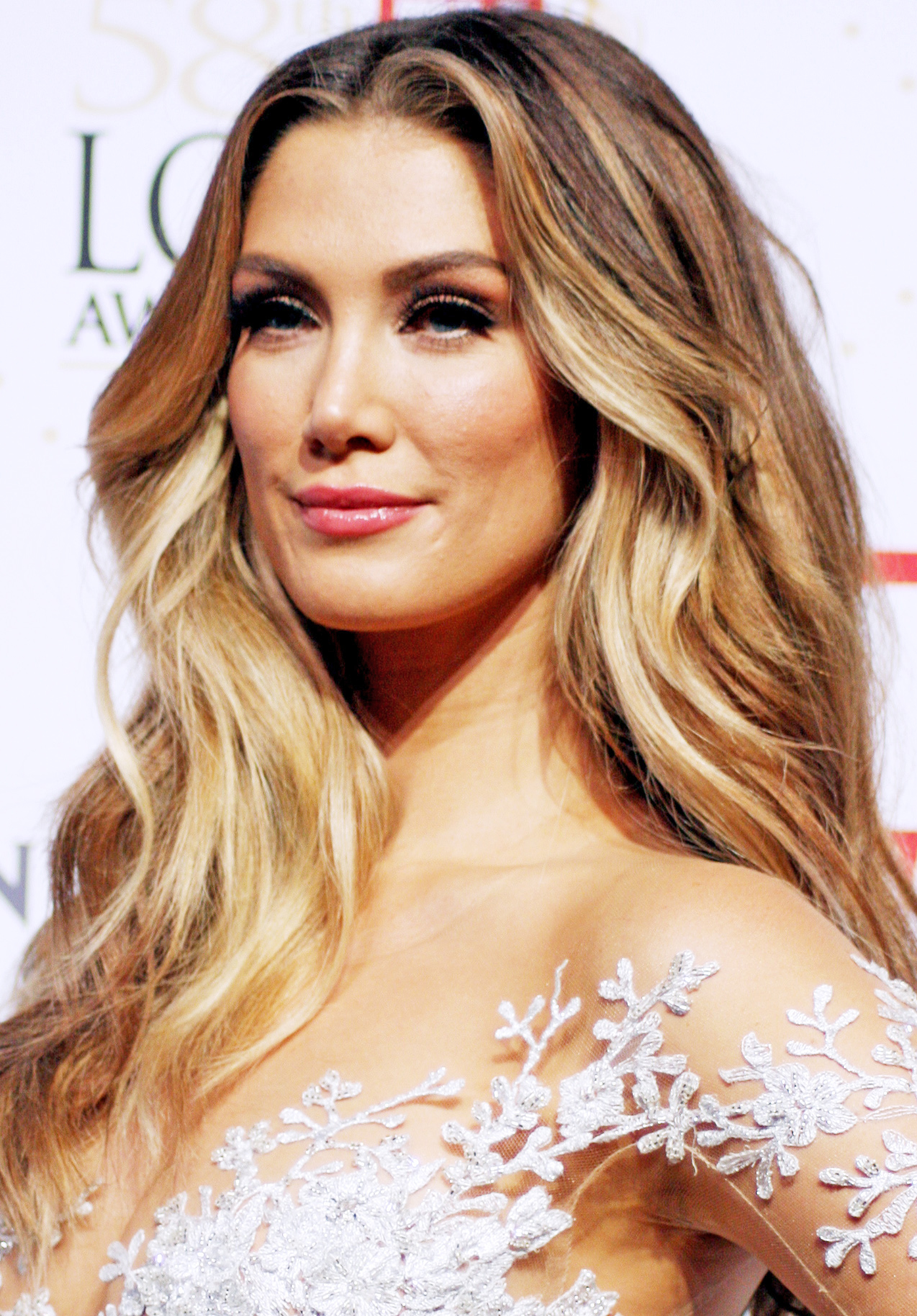
Delta Goodrem

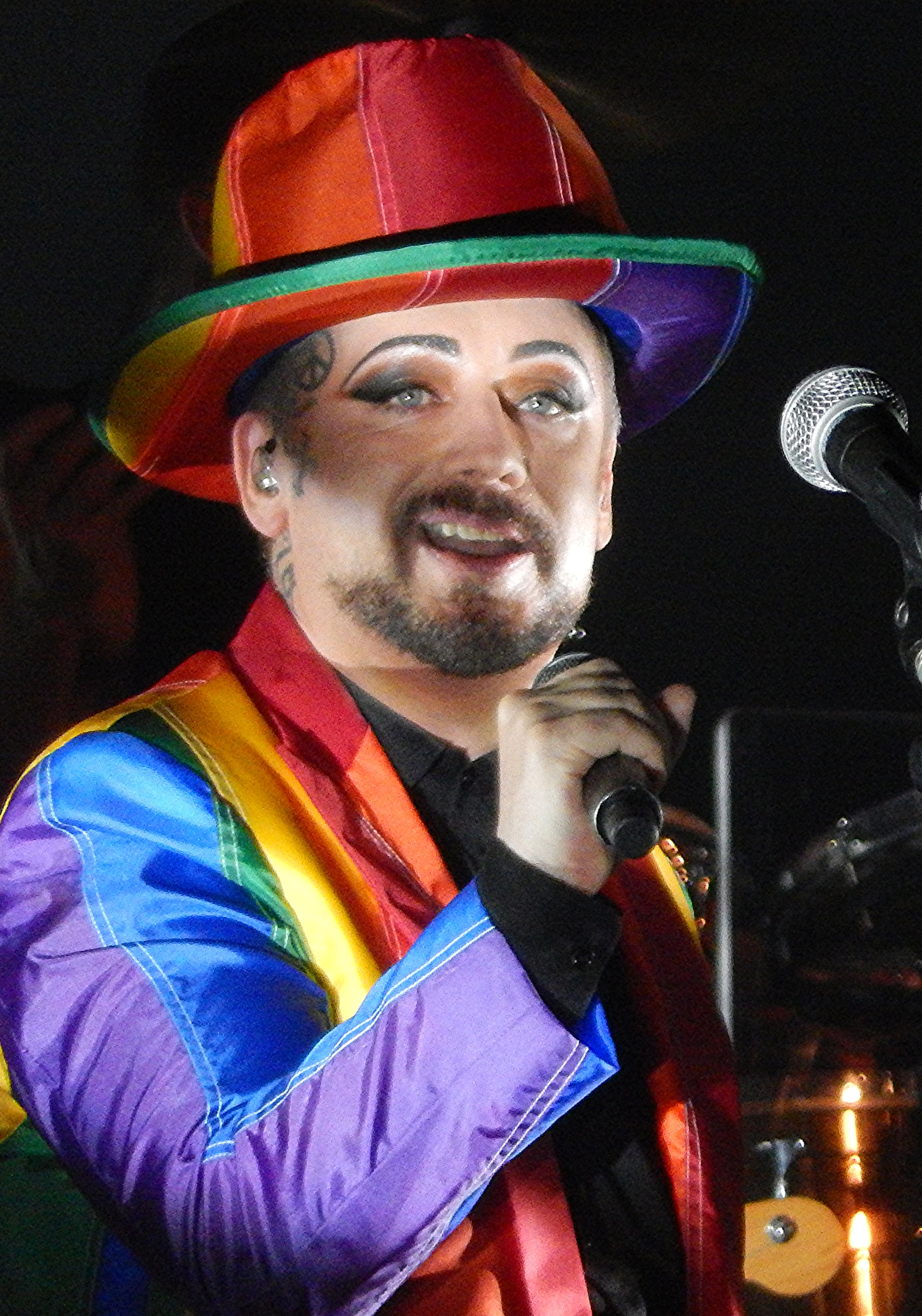
Boy George

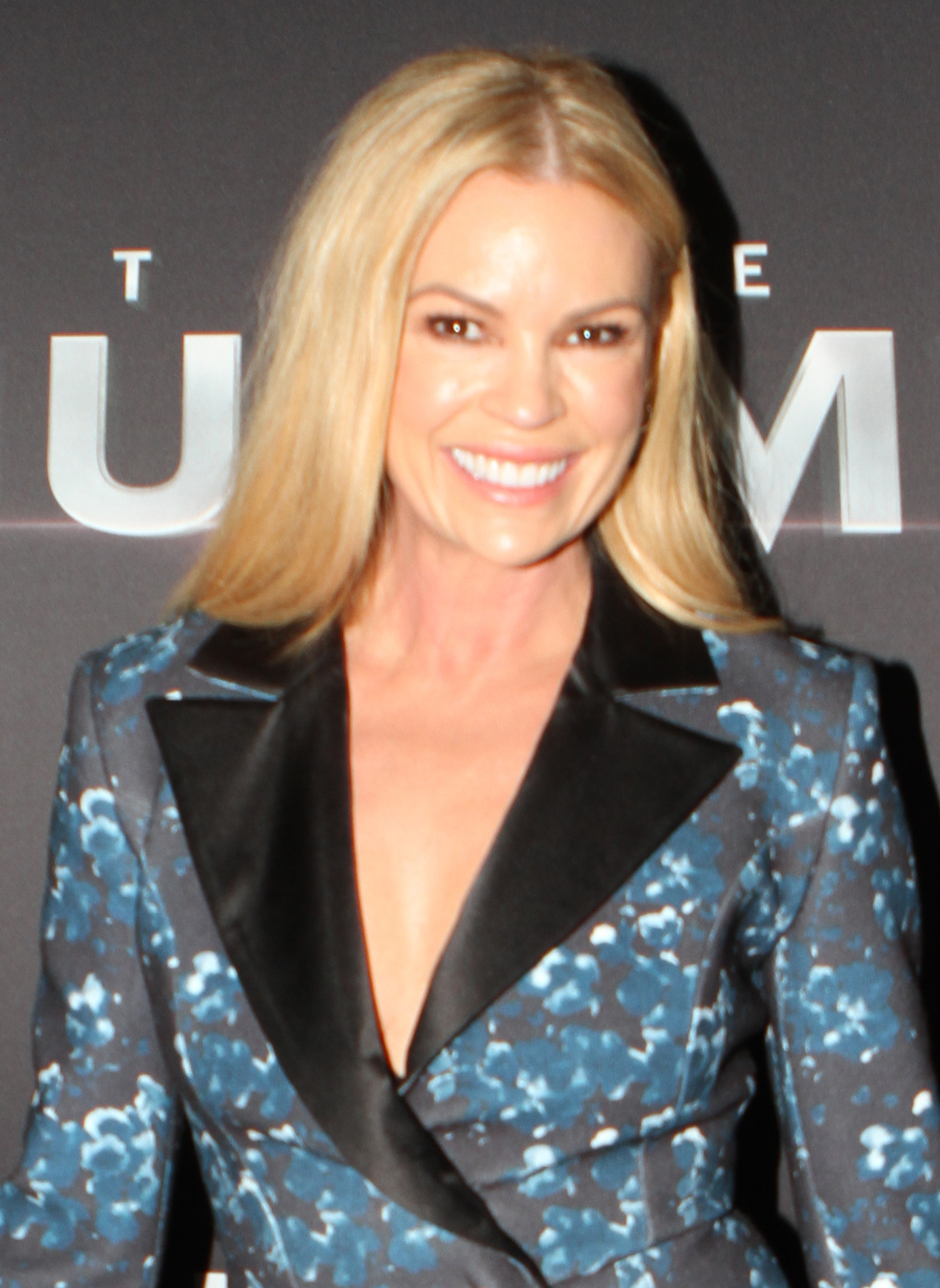
Sonia Kruger

On 17 October 2018, the series was renewed for an eighth season and it was announced that Goodrem, George, and Rowland would all return, along with host Sonia Kruger. On 14 November 2018, Nine announced Guy Sebastian would replace Jonas as the fourth judge for the eighth season.

== Teams ==
Color key

- Winner
- Runner-up
- Third place
- Fourth place
- Eliminated by public vote in the Finals
- Eliminated by the coach in the Finals
- Eliminated in the Battle rounds
- Artist was saved in the Knockout rounds by another coach
- Eliminated in the Knockout rounds

Coach	Top 48				
Kelly Rowland					
Kelly Rowland	**Zeek Power**	Lara Dabbagh	Denzel	Rebecca Selley	Henry Olonga
Kelly Rowland	Luke & Tannah Zancanaro	~~Prinnie Stevens~~	~~Elsa Clement~~	Mack Moses	Amanuael Visser
Kelly Rowland	Jazmin Varlet	Kristie Mercer	Joey Dee	Dakota Striplin	
Guy Sebastian					
Guy Sebastian	Jack Vidgen	Mitch Paulsen	Chynna Taylor	**Elsa Clement**	Kim Sheehy
Guy Sebastian	Chriddy Black	~~Lara Dabbagh~~	~~Jesse Teinaki~~	~~Akina Maria~~	~~Tannah Zancanaro~~
Guy Sebastian	Jordy Marcs	Jessie Eilers	Conor Smith		
Delta Goodrem					
Delta Goodrem	Daniel Shaw	Jordan Anthony	**Sheldon Riley**	Natasha Stuart †	The Koi Boys
Delta Goodrem	Jesse Teinaki	~~Luke Zancanaro~~	Zach Fawor	Emma Sophina	Kimberley Bowden
Delta Goodrem	Erin Cornell	Molly Waters	Nathan Foley		
Boy George					
Boy George	Diana Rouvas	Lee Harding	**Madi Krstevski**	Carlos C Major	Akina Maria
Boy George	Prinnie Stevens	Sellma Soul	Burcell Taka	Oliver Cuthbert	Loma Schaaf
Boy George	Vendulka Wichita	Voli K	Siena Fodera	Dezi K	
Note: Italicized names are saved artists (names struck through within former teams). Bolded names are artist chosen as Wildcards.

== Blind auditions ==
Colour key

✔	Coach hit the "I WANT YOU" button
	Artist defaulted to this team
	Artist elected to join this team
	Artist eliminated with no coach pressing "I WANT YOU" button
	Artist received an 'All Turn'.
	Artist is an 'All Star' contestant.

=== Episode 1 (19 May) ===
Order	Artist	Age	Song	Coaches and artists choices			
Order	Artist	Age	Song	Kelly	Guy	Delta	George
1	Zeek Power	28	"Runnin' (Lose It All)"	✔	✔	✔	✔
2	Luke Zancanaro	25	"Skin"	✔	✔	✔	✔
3	Tannah Zancanaro	24	"Heroes"	✔	✔	✔	✔
4	Prinnie Stevens	38	"When Love Takes Over"	✔	✔	—	✔
5	Carl de Villa	36	"Uptown Funk"	—	—	—	—
6	Chynna Taylor	29	"Shallow"	✔	✔	✔	✔
7	Daniel Shaw	20	"Beneath Your Beautiful"	✔	✔	✔	✔

=== Episode 2 (20 May) ===
Order	Artist	Age	Song	Coaches and artists choices			
Order	Artist	Age	Song	Kelly	Guy	Delta	George
1	Amanuael Visser	17	"Midnight Train To Georgia"	✔	✔	—	✔
2	Diana Rouvas	35	"Vision of Love"	✔	✔	✔	✔
3	Dezi K	36	"Royals"	—	✔	—	✔
4	Budjerah Slabb	16	"Climb Every Mountain"	—	—	—	—
5	Lara Dabbagh	16	"Scars To Your Beautiful"	—	✔	—	—
6	Natasha Stuart	42	"I Was Here"	✔	✔	✔	✔

=== Episode 3 (21 May) ===
Order	Artist	Age	Song	Coaches and artists choices			
Order	Artist	Age	Song	Kelly	Guy	Delta	George
1	Zach Fawor	16	"Mercy"	✔	✔	✔	—
2	Akina Maria	31	"Dangerous Woman"	—	✔	—	✔
3	Tayla Surace	23	"Rolling in the Deep"	—	—	—	—
4	Dakota Striplin	24	"Love Me Tender"	✔	—	✔	—
5	Mack Moses	36	"Señorita"	✔	—	✔	—
6	Sellma Soul	25	"Marry the Night"	—	—	—	✔
7	Madi Krstevski	18	"IDGAF"	✔	—	—	✔

=== Episode 4 (26 May) ===
Order	Artist	Age	Song	Coaches and artists choices			
Order	Artist	Age	Song	Kelly	Guy	Delta	George
1	Lee Harding	35	"Killing in the Name"	✔	✔	✔	✔
2	Oliver Cuthbert	15	"Firestone"	—	—	✔	✔
3	Jemina Reina	50	"Let's Hear It for the Boy"	—	—	—	—
4	Jesse Teinaki	27	"Youngblood"	—	✔	✔	—
5	Kristie Mercer	29	"Nothing Breaks Like a Heart"	✔	✔	—	—
6	The Koi Boys	N/A	"Shake Your Body (Down to the Ground)"	✔	✔	✔	✔
7	Denzel	20	"Akuma" (Original Song)	✔	✔	✔	✔

=== Episode 5 (27 May) ===
Order	Artist	Age	Song	Coaches and artists choices			
Order	Artist	Age	Song	Kelly	Guy	Delta	George
1	Mitch Paulsen	17	"Thank U, Next"	✔	✔	✔	✔
2	Ben Palumbo	39	"Der Hölle Rache"	—	—	—	—
3	Chriddy Black	26	"Dancing On My Own"	✔	✔	✔	✔
4	Ellen Reed	30	"Diamonds"	—	—	—	—
5	Sophie Ann	15	"Fight Song"	—	—	—	—
6	Erin Cornell	33	"Welcome to Earth"	✔	—	✔	—
7	Henry Olonga	42	"This Is the Moment"	✔	—	✔	✔

=== Episode 6 (28 May) ===
Order	Artist	Age	Song	Coaches and artists choices			
Order	Artist	Age	Song	Kelly	Guy	Delta	George
1	Siena Fodera	13	"(You Make Me Feel Like) A Natural Woman"	✔	—	✔	✔
2	Molly Waters	15	"Don't Rain on My Parade"	—	—	✔	—
3	Charlie Fittler	15	"Shotgun"	—	—	—	—
4	Alana Orsulic	N/A	"Let Me Go"	—	—	—	—
5	Aliqua Mao	N/A	"Breathin"	—	—	—	—
6	Hugo Basclain	N/A	"Happier"	—	—	—	—
7	Jessie Eilers	15	"Angel"	✔	✔	—	✔
8	Keenan Te	18	"Say My Name"	—	—	—	—
9	Vendulka Wichta	21	"Karma Chameleon"	—	✔	✔	✔

=== Episode 7 (2 June) ===
Order	Artist	Age	Song	Coaches and artists choices			
Order	Artist	Age	Song	Kelly	Guy	Delta	George
1	Carlos C Major	33	"Despacito"	✔	✔	✔	✔
2	Emma Sophina	36	"Landslide"	—	—	✔	✔
3	Conor Smith	16	"I'm on Fire"	—	✔	—	✔
4	Rebecca Selley	34	"Hold My Hand"	✔	✔	✔	✔
5	Loma Schaaf	23	"His Eye is on the Sparrow"	—	—	—	✔
6	Bertie Anderson	30	"Black or White"	—	—	—	—
7	Jack Vidgen	22	"Hello"	✔	✔	✔	✔

=== Episode 8 (3 June) ===
Order	Artist	Age	Song	Coaches and artists choices			
Order	Artist	Age	Song	Kelly	Guy	Delta	George
1	Kim Sheehy	31	"Both Sides, Now"	—	✔	✔	✔
2	Nathan Foley	39	"Footloose"	—	—	✔	✔
3	Steve Callanan	56	"Working Class Man"	—	—	—	—
4	Jordyn Bartolo	N/A	"On a Night Like This"	—	—	—	—
5	Mercy Vander	23	"Perfect"	—	—	—	—
6	Kimberley Bowden	31	"Sorrento Moon (I Remember)"	—	—	✔	✔
7	Justin Clausen	29	"Emotions"	—	—	—	—
8	Burcell Taka	47	"This Woman's Work"	✔	✔	✔	✔

- Jess Glynne guest auditioned with her song "I'll Be There" and turned all chairs.

=== Episode 9 (4 June) ===
Order	Artist	Age	Song	Coaches and artists choices			
Order	Artist	Age	Song	Kelly	Guy	Delta	George
1	Elsa Clement	19	"Lose Yourself"	✔	✔	✔	✔
2	Josh Maynard	21	"Khe Sanh"	—	—	—	—
3	Joey Dee	42	"Redemption Song"	✔	—	—	✔
4	Claire Fleur	N/A	"Nessun dorma"	—	—	—	—
5	Kirrah Amosa	N/A	"Let You Love Me"	—	—	—	—
6	Jazmin Varlet	22	"Love the Way You Lie (Part II)"	✔	—	—	—
7	After 5	N/A	"Cheap Thrills"	Team full	—	—	—
8	Voli K	35	"I'm Not the Only One"	Team full	✔	✔	✔

=== Episode 10 (9 June) ===
Order	Artist	Age	Song	Coaches and artists choices			
Order	Artist	Age	Song	Kelly	Guy	Delta	George
1	Sheldon Riley	20	"Frozen"	Team Full	✔	✔	Team Full
2	Billy Harris	24	"Nutbush City Limits"	Team Full	—	—	Team Full
3	Belle Bangard	24	"Came Here for Love"	Team Full	—	—	Team Full
4	Jordy Marcs	21	"Tennessee Whiskey"	Team Full	✔	✔	Team Full
5	Chloe Buchan	18	"My Heart Will Go On"	Team Full	Team full	—	Team Full
6	Matthew Garwood	29	"You Raise Me Up"	Team Full	Team full	—	Team Full
7	Jordan Anthony	14	"What About Us"	Team Full	Team full	✔	Team Full

== The Knockouts ==
The Knockout rounds started on 10 June. The coaches can save two losing artists from any team, including their own. Contestants who win their battle or are saved will advance to the Battle rounds.

Color key:

Artist won the Knockout and advanced to the Battles
Artist lost the Knockout but was saved by another coach and advanced to the Battles
Artist lost the Knockout but was saved by their coach and advanced to the Battles
Artist lost the Knockout and was eliminated

=== Episode 11 (10 June) ===
Order	Coach	Theme	Winner		Losers		'Steal'/'Save' result			
Order	Coach	Theme	Artist	Song	Artists	Song	Kelly	Guy	Delta	Boy George
1	Delta	The Weeknd	Sheldon Riley	"Call Out My Name"	Nathan Foley	"Can't Feel My Face"	—	—	—	—
1	Delta	The Weeknd	Sheldon Riley	"Call Out My Name"	Luke Zancanaro*	"Pray for Me"	✔	—	—	—
2	Guy	Shawn Mendes	Kim Sheehy	"In My Blood"	Tannah Zancanaro*	"Lost In Japan"	✔	—	—	—
2	Guy	Shawn Mendes	Kim Sheehy	"In My Blood"	Jessie Eilers	"Mercy"	—	—	—	—
3	Boy George	Queen	Lee Harding	"We Will Rock You"	Dezi K	"Radio Ga Ga"	—	—	—	—
3	Boy George	Queen	Lee Harding	"We Will Rock You"	Siena Fodera	"I Want To Break Free"	—	—	—	—
4	Guy	Madonna	Chynna Taylor	"Papa Don't Preach"	Akina Maria	"Vogue"	—	—	—	✔
4	Guy	Madonna	Chynna Taylor	"Papa Don't Preach"	Conor Smith	"Ray of Light"	—	—	—	—
5	Kelly	The Lion King	Henry Olonga	"Can You Feel The Love Tonight"	Dakota Striplin	"I Just Can't Wait to Be King"	—	—	—	—
5	Kelly	The Lion King	Henry Olonga	"Can You Feel The Love Tonight"	Joey Dee	"Circle of Life"	—	—	—	—

- Kelly first used her save on Luke; when Tannah lost her knockout and no saves were used Kelly suggested she became a duo with Luke. Both artists agreed.

=== Episode 12 (11 June) ===
Order	Coach	Theme	Winner		Losers		'Steal'/'Save' result			
Order	Coach	Theme	Artist	Song	Artists	Song	Kelly	Guy	Delta	Boy George
1	Guy	Ariana Grande	Mitch Paulsen	"God is a Woman"	Chriddy Black	"Almost is Never Enough"	—	✔	✔	—
1	Guy	Ariana Grande	Mitch Paulsen	"God is a Woman"	Jesse Teinaki	"Breathin"	—	—	✔	—
2	Boy George	A Star is Born	Diana Rouvas	"I'll Never Love Again"	Vendulka Wichta	"Always Remember Us This Way"	—	—	—	—
2	Boy George	A Star is Born	Diana Rouvas	"I'll Never Love Again"	Voli K	"Shallow"	—	—	—	—
3	Delta	Grease	The Koi Boys	"Greased Lightning"	Erin Cornell	"Hopelessly Devoted To You"	—	—	—	—
3	Delta	Grease	The Koi Boys	"Greased Lightning"	Molly Waters	"We Go Together"	—	—	—	—
4	Kelly	Sam Smith	Zeek Power	"Lay Me Down"	Jazmin Varlet	"Dancing With a Stranger"	—	—	—	—
4	Kelly	Sam Smith	Zeek Power	"Lay Me Down"	Kristie Mercer	"Promises"	—	—	—	—
5	Boy George	Risk Takers & Rule Breakers	Madi Krstevski	"Smells Like Teen Spirit"	Loma Schaaf	"I Fall Apart"	—	—	—	—
5	Boy George	Risk Takers & Rule Breakers	Madi Krstevski	"Smells Like Teen Spirit"	Oliver Cuthbert	"True Colors"	—	—	—	—
6	Delta	Survivors	Natasha Stuart	"Everybody Hurts"	Emma Sophina	"The Climb"	—	—	—	—
6	Delta	Survivors	Natasha Stuart	"Everybody Hurts"	Kimberley Bowden	"Titanium"	—	—	—	—

=== Episode 13 (16 June) ===
Order	Coach	Theme	Winner		Losers		'Steal'/'Save' result			
Order	Coach	Theme	Artist	Song	Artists	Song	Kelly	Guy	Delta	George
1	Kelly	The Revolution	Denzel	"Revolution" (Original Song)*	Amanuael Visser	"Man in the Mirror"	—	—	—	—
1	Kelly	The Revolution	Denzel	"Revolution" (Original Song)*	Elsa Clement	"Run the World (Girls)"	✔	✔	—	—
2	Guy	Rihanna	Jack Vidgen	"Love the Way You Lie (Part II)"	Jordy Marcs	"Love on the Brain"	—	Team full	—	—
2	Guy	Rihanna	Jack Vidgen	"Love the Way You Lie (Part II)"	Lara Dabbagh	"Umbrella"	✔	Team full	—	—
3	Delta	Dua Lipa	Jordan Anthony	"Scared to Be Lonely"	Daniel Shaw	"New Rules"	Team full	Team full	✔	—
3	Delta	Dua Lipa	Jordan Anthony	"Scared to Be Lonely"	Zach Fawor	"Be the One"	Team full	Team full	—	—
4	George	Destiny's Child	Carlos C Major	"Jumpin', Jumpin'"	Burcell Taka	"Emotion"	Team full	Team full	Team full	—
4	George	Destiny's Child	Carlos C Major	"Jumpin', Jumpin'"	Sellma Soul	"Bootylicious"	Team full	Team full	Team full	—
5	Kelly	Parenting	Rebecca Selley	"Sweet Child o' Mine"	Mack Moses	"Blue"	Team full	Team full	Team full	—
5	Kelly	Parenting	Rebecca Selley	"Sweet Child o' Mine"	Prinnie Stevens	"ABC"	Team full	Team full	Team full	✔

- Denzel was originally given "This is America", but Kelly opted to give him an original song.

== Battle rounds ==
The Battle rounds started on 17 June. After all of their team's battles were done, the coaches chose one of their losing artists as a wildcard. The top 16 contestants then moved on to the Finals.

Color key:

Artist won the Battle and advanced to the Finals
Artist lost the Battle but was chosen as a wildcard and advanced to the Finals
Artist lost the Battle and was eliminated

=== Episode 14 (17 June) ===
Order	Coach	Winner	Battle Song	Loser
1	George	Diana Rouvas	"Freedom"	Prinnie Stevens
2	Guy	Mitch Paulsen	"Eastside"	Elsa Clement
3	Delta	Jordan Anthony	"Praying"	Sheldon Riley
4	Kelly	Rebecca Selley	"Don't You Worry 'bout a Thing"	Luke & Tannah Zancanaro
5	Delta	Natasha Stuart	"Giant"	Jesse Teinaki
6	Guy	Jack Vidgen	"Say Something"	Chriddy Black
7	Kelly	Denzel	"Skyfall / Lose Yourself"	Henry Olonga

=== Episode 15 (18 June) ===
Order	Coach	Winner	Battle Song	Loser
1	George	Carlos C Major	"Dirty Diana"	Akina Maria
2	Kelly	Lara Dabbagh	"Lovely"	Zeek Power
3	Guy	Chynna Taylor	"Never Tear Us Apart"	Kim Sheehy
4	George	Lee Harding	"Leave a Light On"	Madi Krstevski
5	Delta	Daniel Shaw	"Let It Be"	The Koi Boys

== The Finals ==
=== Episodes 16 & 17 (24 & 25 June) ===
The first week of the Finals was pre-taped and first broadcast on 24 & 25 June 2019. Over the two episodes, all artists of the Top 16 take on a solo performance. Team George & Team Kelly perform on the first night and Team Delta & Team Guy perform on the second night. At the end of each episode, the coaches choose three out of their four artists to advance to the Live Top 12.

Order	Coach	Contestant	Song	Result
Episode 16 (Teams Kelly & George)
1	Kelly	Lara Dabbagh	"Green Light"	Saved by coach
2	George	Lee Harding	"Uprising"	Saved by coach
3	Kelly	Rebecca Selley	"Ave Maria"	Eliminated
4	George	Carlos C Major	"One Dance"	Eliminated
5	Kelly	Zeek Power	"Pray for Me"	Saved by coach
6	George	Diana Rouvas	"A Song for You"	Saved by coach
7	Kelly	Denzel	"Power"	Saved by coach
8	George	Madi Krstevski	"I'm a Slave 4 U"	Saved by coach
Episode 17 (Teams Delta & Guy)
1	Delta	Sheldon Riley	"Everybody Wants to Rule the World"	Saved by coach
2	Guy	Mitch Paulsen	"Bad Guy"	Saved by coach
3	Delta	Natasha Stuart	"Everybody's Free (To Feel Good)"	Eliminated
4	Guy	Elsa Clement	"No Scrubs"	Eliminated
5	Delta	Daniel Shaw	"Addicted to Love"	Saved by coach
6	Guy	Chynna Taylor	"Alone"	Saved by coach
7	Guy	Jack Vidgen	"Rise Up"	Saved by coach
8	Delta	Jordan Anthony	"This is Me"	Saved by coach

Non-competition performances
Order	Performer(s)	Song
16.1	Karise Eden & the Top 16	"We Are the Champions" & "It's a Man's World"
16.2	Adam Lambert	"New Eyes"
17.1	Jessica Mauboy	"Little Things"
17.2	Boy George & Kelly Rowland	"Runaway Train"

=== Episode 18 (1 July) ===
Order	Coach	Contestant	Song	Result
Top 12 Performances
1	Delta	Jordan Anthony	"Somebody to Love"	Saved by public
2	Kelly	Lara Dabbagh	"All the Stars"	Eliminated
3	George	Lee Harding	"The Beautiful People"	Saved by public
4	Guy	Chynna Taylor	"California Dreamin'"	Saved by public
5	Kelly	Denzel	"Okay Okay" (Original Song)	Eliminated
6	Guy	Mitch Paulsen	"I Don't Care"	Saved by public
7	Delta	Sheldon Riley	"7 Rings"	Saved by public
8	Kelly	Zeek Power	"Feels"	Saved by public
9	George	Madi Krstevski	"Look What You Made Me Do"	Eliminated
10	Guy	Jack Vidgen	"Dusk Till Dawn"	Saved by public
11	George	Diana Rouvas	"Never Enough"	Saved by public
12	Delta	Daniel Shaw	"Torn"	Saved by public

Non-competition performance
Performer(s)	Song
Morgan Evans	"Young Again"

=== Semi-final (2 July) ===
With the eliminations of Jack Vidgen, Chynna Taylor, and Mitch Paulsen, Guy Sebastian had no more contestants left on his team, making this the fourth season in the Australian version of the franchise where a coach did not have a contestant in the Grand Finale. This is also the fourth occurrence in the last 5 seasons of the show, though this would be the last season a coach did not have a contestant in the Grand Finale. However, this is also the first and only season so far, that a coach lost three artists in the semifinals, as well as the first instance that a debuting coach is not represented in the finale. Additionally, this is also the second season where Delta Goodrem managed to bring two artists to the Grand Finale. Goodrem is the only coach to have two artists in the Grand Finale, twice, and having no artists in the Grand Finale, twice.

Order	Coach	Contestant	Song	Result
Top 9 Performances
1	Delta	Jordan Anthony	"Listen"	Saved by public
2	George	Lee Harding	"Walk This Way"	Eliminated
3	Guy	Jack Vidgen	"You Are the Reason"	Eliminated
4	Kelly	Zeek Power	"Without Me"	Saved by public
5	Guy	Chynna Taylor	"Jolene"	Eliminated
6	Delta	Daniel Shaw	"Someone You Loved"	Saved by public
7	Guy	Mitch Paulsen	"Better Now"	Eliminated
8	George	Diana Rouvas	"Hallelujah"	Saved by public
9	Delta	Sheldon Riley	"The Show Must Go On"	Eliminated

Non-competition performance
Performer(s)	Song
Guy Sebastian	"Choir"
Little Mix	"Bounce Back"

== Grand Finale ==
The Grand Finale was first broadcast on 7 July 2019.

With Diana Rouvas's win, this marks the first time in the Australian history that an artist from a past season won the competition. And this is the first time since the third season in which a male coach won the show.

Solo performances
Order	Coach	Contestant	Song	Result
2	Kelly	Zeek Power	"Kiss" by Prince	Third Place
3	Delta	Jordan Anthony	"Walk Me Home" by Pink	Fourth Place
4	George	Diana Rouvas	"I Will Always Love You" by Whitney Houston	Winner
6	Delta	Daniel Shaw	"The Scientist" by Coldplay	Runner-up

Duet performances
Order	Duet performers		Song
Order	Coach	Contestant	Song
1	Delta	Daniel Shaw	"Bitter Sweet Symphony" by The Verve
5	Kelly	Zeek Power	"Earth Song" by Michael Jackson
7	George	Diana Rouvas	"Send In the Clowns" by Barbra Streisand
8	Delta	Jordan Anthony	"You Say" by Lauren Daigle

Special guest performances
Order	Performer/s	Song
	5 Seconds of Summer	"Easier"

== Live Shows Elimination Charts ==
=== Overall ===
Artist's info

- Artist from Team Kelly
- Artist from Team Guy
- Artist from Team Delta
- Artist from Team George

Result details

- Winner
- Runner-up
- Third place
- Fourth place
- Artist was saved by the public
- Artist was saved by the coach
- Artist was eliminated by public
- Artist was eliminated by coach

The Finals results per week
Artist	Recorded Final	Week 1		Grand Finale	
Artist	Recorded Final	Top 12	Semi-Final	Round 1	Round 2
Diana Rouvas	Safe	Safe	Safe	Safe	Winner
Daniel Shaw	Safe	Safe	Safe	Safe	Runner-up
Zeek Power	Safe	Safe	Safe	3rd Place	Eliminated (Grand Finale Round 1)
Jordan Anthony	Safe	Safe	Safe	4th Place	Eliminated (Grand Finale Round 1)
Chynna Taylor	Safe	Safe	Eliminated	Eliminated (Semi-Finals)	
Jack Vidgen	Safe	Safe	Eliminated	Eliminated (Semi-Finals)	
Lee Harding	Safe	Safe	Eliminated	Eliminated (Semi-Finals)	
Mitch Paulsen	Safe	Safe	Eliminated	Eliminated (Semi-Finals)	
Sheldon Riley	Safe	Safe	Eliminated	Eliminated (Semi-Finals)	
Lara Dabbagh	Safe	Eliminated	Eliminated (Week 1)		
Madi Krstevski	Safe	Eliminated	Eliminated (Week 1)		
Denzel	Safe	Eliminated	Eliminated (Week 1)		
Carlos C Major	Eliminated	Eliminated (Recorded Final)			
Elsa Clement	Eliminated	Eliminated (Recorded Final)			
Natasha Stuart	Eliminated	Eliminated (Recorded Final)			
Rebecca Selley	Eliminated	Eliminated (Recorded Final)			

=== Team ===
Result details

- Winner
- Runner-up
- 3rd place
- 4th place
- Artist was saved by the public
- Artist was saved by the coach
- Artist was eliminated by the public
- Artist was eliminated by the coach

The Finals results per week
Artist	Recorded Final	Week 1		Grand Finale	
Artist	Recorded Final	Top 12	Semi-Final	Round 1	Round 2
Zeek Power	Safe	Safe	Safe	3rd Place	
Lara Dabbagh	Safe	Eliminated			
Denzel	Safe	Eliminated			
Rebecca Selley	Eliminated				
Jack Vidgen	Safe	Safe	Eliminated		
Mitch Paulsen	Safe	Safe	Eliminated		
Chynna Taylor	Safe	Safe	Eliminated		
Elsa Clement	Eliminated				
Daniel Shaw	Safe	Safe	Safe	Safe	Runner-up
Jordan Anthony	Safe	Safe	Safe	4th Place	
Sheldon Riley	Safe	Safe	Eliminated		
Natasha Stuart	Eliminated				
Diana Rouvas	Safe	Safe	Safe	Safe	Winner
Lee Harding	Safe	Safe	Eliminated		
Madi Krstevski	Safe	Eliminated			
Carlos C Major	Eliminated				

== Contestants who appeared on previous season or TV shows ==
- Luke Zancanaro and Tannah Zancanaro auditioned together as a duo on The X Factor in season seven, but didn't make the Live Shows. They were mentored by Guy Sebastian.
- Prinnie Stevens competed on the first season, where she was mentored by Joel Madden and reached top 12. She also co-hosted The Voice Kids with Darren McMullen in 2014, and appeared on the second season of Australian Idol where she was a semi-finalist.
- Chynna Taylor appeared on the eighth season of The X Factor in 2016, finishing in 6th place. She was mentored by Guy Sebastian.
- Amanuael Visser competed on the 2012 revival of Young Talent Time where he was a grand-finalist.
- Diana Rouvas competed on the show's first season, where she was mentored by Keith Urban and reached top 8.
- Lara Dabbagh auditioned in the previous season, but didn't turn a chair.
- Madi Krstevski competed in the previous season, mentored by Kelly Rowland and later Joe Jonas, only to end up eliminated in the battle rounds.
- Lee Harding competed on the third season of Australian Idol, where he was eliminated in third place.
- Jesse Teinaki auditioned on the sixth season of The X Factor in 2014, but didn't make the Live Shows.
- The Koi Boys competed on the show's fifth season, where they were mentored by Jessie J and were eliminated in the Super Battle Rounds.
- Ellen Reed competed on the show's fifth season, where she was mentored by Jessie J, reached the grand final and ended up in fourth place.
- Molly Waters competed on the first season of ‘’The Voice Kids Australia’’ in 2014, where she was mentored by Mel B and was eliminated in the Battle Rounds. She also performed in Creative Generation – State Schools Onstage.
- Aliqua Mao appeared on the seventh season of Australian Idol where she was a semi-finalist.
- Vendulka Wichta auditioned on The X Factor in season four and season five, but didn't make the Live Shows in both seasons.
- Carlos C Major competed on the show's third season, where he was mentored by Ricky Martin and reached the top 16. He also appeared on the second season of Australian Idol where he was a semi-finalist, under the name Carlos Velazquez.
- Jack Vidgen was the winner of the fifth season of Australia's Got Talent.
- Kim Sheehy competed on the show's fifth season, where she was mentored by Delta Goodrem and reached top 12. She also auditioned for the second season, but failed to turn a chair.
- Nathan Foley was an original member of Hi-5.
- Jazmin Varlet auditioned for the show's sixth season, but didn't turn a chair.
- Sheldon Riley appeared in Creative Generation – State Schools Onstage in 2016 on Network 10, and was later a contestant on the eighth season of The X Factor as a member of Time and Place, who were eliminated on the first live show. He also competed on the show's seventh season, where he placed third and was mentored by Boy George.
- Matthew Garwood competed on the show's third season, where he was mentored by Ricky Martin. He was eliminated in the Showdowns.
- Rebecca Selley auditioned for the show's season 1 with no chair turned and she competed in season 1 of Australian Idol and got eliminated in the wild cards for the semi-finals, when she was Rebecca Tapia at the time.
- Joey Dee was a member of Young Talent Time from 1987 to 1988.

== Ratings ==
Colour key:
– Highest rating during the season
– Lowest rating during the season

The Voice season eight consolidated viewership and adjusted position
Episode		Original airdate	Timeslot	Viewers (millions)	Night Rank	Source
1	"The Blind Auditions"	19 May 2019	Sunday 7:00 pm	1.064	3	
2	"The Blind Auditions"	20 May 2019	Monday 7:30 pm	1.026	3	
3	"The Blind Auditions"	21 May 2019	Tuesday 7:30 pm	0.927	5	
4	"The Blind Auditions"	26 May 2019	Sunday 7:30 pm	1.156	1	
5	"The Blind Auditions"	27 May 2019	Monday 7:30 pm	1.015	4	
6	"The Blind Auditions"	28 May 2019	Tuesday 7:30 pm	1.022	2	
7	"The Blind Auditions"	2 June 2019	Sunday 7:00 pm	1.180	2	
8	"The Blind Auditions"	3 June 2019	Monday 7:30 pm	1.095	3	
9	"The Blind Auditions"	4 June 2019	Tuesday 7:30 pm	1.068	3	
10	"The Blind Auditions"	9 June 2019	Sunday 7:00 pm	0.971	2	
11	"The Knockout Rounds"	10 June 2019	Monday 7:30 pm	1.110	3	
12	"The Knockout Rounds"	11 June 2019	Tuesday 7:30 pm	1.114	2	
13	"The Knockout Rounds"	16 June 2019	Sunday 7:00 pm	1.141	1	
14	"The Battle Rounds"	17 June 2019	Monday 7:30 pm	1.046	3	
15	"The Battle Rounds"	18 June 2019	Tuesday 7:30 pm	1.105	1	
16	"The Finals"	24 June 2019	Monday 7:30 pm	0.897	5	
17	"The Finals"	25 June 2019	Tuesday 7:30 pm	0.835	5	
18	"The Finals"	1 July 2019	Monday 7:30 pm	0.902	5	
19	"The Semi-Finals"	2 July 2019	Tuesday 7:30 pm	0.859	5	
20	"The Grand Finale" "Winner Announced"	7 July 2019	Sunday 7:00 pm	1.019 1.069	4 2	
