= Diana Rouvas =

Australian musician

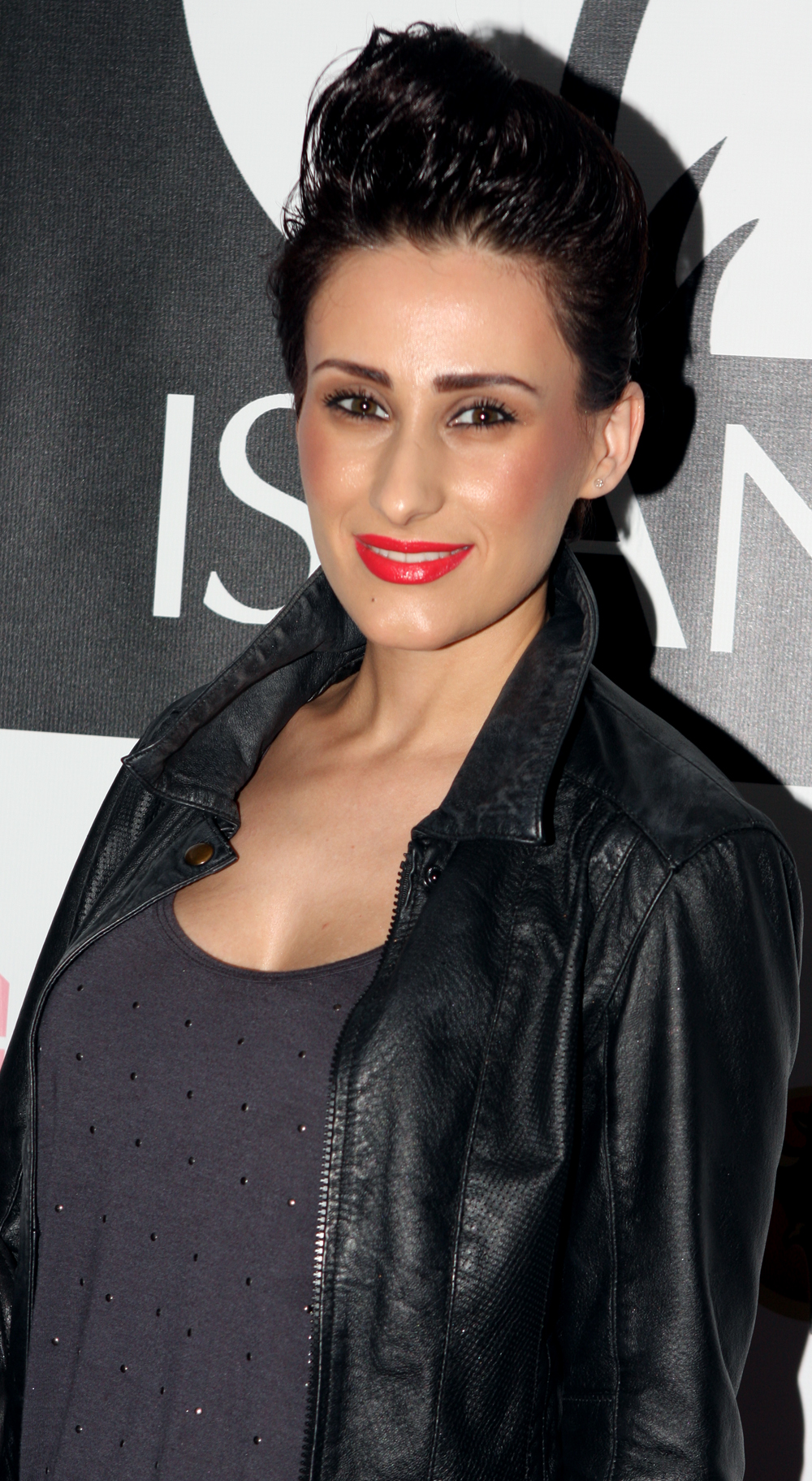
- Rouvas in 2012

Background information
- Born: 29 January 1984 (age 42); Sydney, Australia
- Genres: Soul, pop
- Instruments: Vocals, piano
- Years active: 2001–present
- Label: Universal Music Australia (2014–2015)
- Website: dianarouvas.com.au

Diana Rouvas (born 29 January 1984) is an Australian singer-songwriter previously signed to Universal Music Australia. In 2019, she won The Voice Australia, against Daniel Shaw. She was born in Sydney to a Greek father and Australian mother.

== Career and background ==
Rouvas started vocal training at age four, and writing at age eight. She was on stage at an early age performing, and relocated to the United States of America at 16 to pursue her music career as a singer-songwriter. In 2001, at 17 she toured with Australian artist Tina Arena as a backing vocalist, visiting France and China. In 2006, Diana represented Australia in G'day LA celebrations in Los Angeles. In 2006, she recorded and released an original Extended Play titled Never Said Hello.

=== 2012–2018: The Voice 2012 ===
In 2012, Rouvas auditioned for the first season of The Voice, performing "Work It Out" and was selected on Team Keith Urban. She made it to the final top eight. Two of the songs she performed on the show reached the top 30 on the ARIA Charts.

The Voice performances and results (2012)
Episode	Song	Original Artist	Result
Audition	"Work It Out"	Beyoncé	Through to the Battle Rounds
Battle Rounds	"Mr. Know It All"	Kelly Clarkson	Through to live shows
Live show 1	"Love on Top"	Beyoncé	Saved by Coach
Live show 2	"I Can't Make You Love Me"	Bonnie Raitt	Saved by Coach
Semi Final	"Stormy Monday"	T-Bone Walker	Eliminated

In October 2012, Rouvas released "Run" with Damien Leith. The song was the second single from Leith's fifth studio album, Now & Then.

Rouvas was signed to Universal Music Australia, and in April 2014, released the single "Heart of Goodbye" which she co-wrote with producer and songwriter Louis Schoorl. An EP was planned but never released. Upon her request, in 2015 Diana was released from her Universal Music Australia contract.

=== 2019: The Voice 2019 and Eurovision – Australia Decides ===
In 2019, Rouvas returned and auditioned for The Voice (Australian season 8) and chose Team Boy George. On 7 July 2019, Rouvas was announced as the winner.

denotes winner.

The Voice performances and results (2019)
Episode	Song	Original Artist	Result
Audition	"Vision Of Love"	Mariah Carey	Through to The Knockouts
The Knockouts	"I'll Never Love Again"	Lady Gaga	Through to Battle Rounds
Battle Rounds	"Freedom"	Beyoncé ft. Kendrick Lamar	Through to live shows
Live show 1	"A Song for You"	Leon Russell	Saved by Coach
Live show 2	"Never Enough"	Loren Allred	Saved by Public
Semi Final	"Hallelujah"	Leonard Cohen	Saved by Public
Grand Final	"I Will Always Love You"	Whitney Houston	Winner
Grand Final	"Send In the Clowns" (with Boy George)	Barbra Streisand	Winner
Grand Final	"Wait for No One" (Original Song)	Rouvas	Winner

Her debut single "Wait For No One" was released immediately after the finale on 7 July. The track failed to break into the ARIA top 500, shifting less than 800 units during its release week. Remixes were released in August 2019.

In December 2019, Rouvas was announced as a participant in Eurovision - Australia Decides, in an attempt to represent Australia in the Eurovision Song Contest 2020. Her song "Can We Make Heaven" finished 7th in a field of 10.

== Discography ==
=== EPs ===
List of extended plays
Title	Details
Never Said Hello	Released: 2006; Label: Melke

=== Singles ===
List of singles as lead artist
Title	Year	Album
"If We Never Said Hello"	2006	Never Said Hello
"Run" (with Damien Leith)	2012	Now & Then
"Heart of Goodbye"	2014	Non-album singles
"Wait for No One"	2019	Non-album singles
"Can We Make Heaven"	2020	Australia Decides 2020

=== Other charted songs ===
List of other charted songs, with selected chart positions
Title	Year	Peak chart positions	Album
Title	Year	AUS	Album
"Love On Top"	2012	22	Non-album singles from The Voice
"I Can't Make You Love Me"	2012	16	Non-album singles from The Voice

Preceded by Sam Perry	The Voice winner 2019	Succeeded by Chris Sebastian
