= Now & Then (Damien Leith album) =

Studio album by Damien Leith
- Released: 20 April 2012 (Australia)
- Genre: Pop rock, alternative rock, acoustic rock
- Length: 44:24
- Label: Sony Music Australia

Damien Leith chronology
Roy: A Tribute To Roy Orbison (2011)	Now & Then (2012)	Chapter Seven (2013)

Singles from Now & Then
- 1. "Beautiful (2012)"; 2. "Run (featuring Diana Rouvas) " Released: 19 October 2012

Now & Then is the fifth studio album (sixth overall) by Australian Idol 2006 winner Damien Leith. It was released by Sony Music Australia in Australia on 20 April 2012. It was the last album of Leith's released by Sony until the release of Songs From Ireland (2015). The album spawned two singles and a tour.

== Background ==
Following a successful 2011 where Leith's Roy: A Tribute To Roy Orbison album climbed to #2 on the ARIA album charts, had a national sell out tour, was a finalist on ‘Dancing With The Stars’ and hosted his own TV program, Leith released his sixth album in six years, called Now & Then.

The “now” in Now & Then represents a selection of Damien's self-penned songs. The collection includes a version of fan-favourite “Beautiful”, which is already being heard around the world as the theme song for the new global campaign by perfume giant Estée Lauder. And "then" in Now & Then sees Damien pick up where the Roy project left off, further celebrating and honouring the music of Roy Orbison, this time alongside the Traveling Wilburys.

== Track listing ==
1. "End of the Line" (3:36)
2. "Beautiful" (2012 Stuart Crichton Mix) (3:46)
3. "Got My Mind Set on You" (3:47)
4. "Maybe Someday" (3:36)
5. "Here Comes the Sun" (2:58)
6. "Let Me Be Your Rescue" (3:24)
7. "I'll Be Your Baby Tonight" (3:33)
8. "I Won't Back Down" (2:51)
9. "500 Reasons" (3:28)
10. "Leah" (2:54)
11. "Run" (featuring Diana Rouvas) (3:57)
12. "Can't Get It Out of My Head" (3:41)

== Charts ==
Now & Then debuted and peaked on the ARIA charts at number 12.

=== Weekly charts ===
Chart (2012)	Peak position
Australian Albums (ARIA)	12

=== Year-end charts ===
Chart (2012)	Position
Australian Artists Albums Chart	42

== Tour ==
A national tour was announced with tickets on sale from April 2012.

- Thursday 6 September – Her Majesty's Theatre, Adelaide.
- Friday 7 September – Mandurah Performing Arts Centre, Mandurah.
- Saturday 8 September – Astor Theatre, Perth.
- Friday 14 September – Wrest Point Entertainment Centre, Hobart.
- Saturday 15 September – Country Club Casino, Launceston.
- Thursday 20 September – Wangaratta Performing Arts Centre, Wangaratta.
- Friday 21 September – The Palms At Crown, Melbourne.
- Friday 5 October – QPAC Brisbane Concert Hall, Brisbane.
- Saturday 6 October – State Theatre, Sydney.
