= Roy: A Tribute to Roy Orbison =

Studio album by Damien Leith
- Released: 15 April 2011 (Australia)
- Recorded: 2010–2011 in various studios in Nashville, Los Angeles, Sydney
- Genre: Pop rock, alternative rock, acoustic rock
- Length: 47:05
- Label: Sony BMG Australia
- Producer: Barbara Orbison and Stuart Crichton

Damien Leith chronology
Remember June (2009)	Roy: A Tribute to Roy Orbison (2011)	Now & Then (2012)

Roy: A Tribute to Roy Orbison is the fourth studio album by Damien Leith. It was released by Sony BMG in Australia on 15 April 2011 to coincide with Roy Orbison's 75th birthday.

== Background ==
In 2006, while in the top 10 of Australian Idol, Damien performed Orbison's 1961 hit "Crying" to a standing ovation. Barbara Orbison, Roy's widow saw the performance and contacted the show's producers for a copy. She asked to hear more, eventually leading to an entire tribute album for what would have been Roy's 75th birthday.

One or more Roy Orbison covers were planned for 2008's Catch the Wind: Songs of a Generation, but instead led to recording this album. Three music videos were released, one for "Only the Lonely", one for "Oh, Pretty Woman", and one for "Blue Bayou" (featuring The McClymonts).

== Track listing ==
1. "Only the Lonely" – 2:25
2. "Crying" – 3:12
3. "Dream Baby" (with Damon Elliott) – 3:04
4. "Oh, Pretty Woman" – 2:45
5. "In Dreams" – 3:55
6. "Blue Bayou" (with The McClymonts) – 3:40
7. "I Drove All Night" – 4:21
8. "Handle with Care" (with Bobby Flynn, Mark Gable and Ilan Kidron) – 3:46
9. "You Got It" – 3:32
10. "She's a Mystery to Me" – 4:23
11. "Running Scared" – 2:18
12. "It's Over" – 2:58
13. "Love Hurts" – 3:36
14. "Working for the Man" – 3:16
15. "California Blue" (iTunes store only) – 3:53

== Charts and certification ==
=== Weekly charts ===
Chart performance for Roy: A Tribute to Roy Orbison
Chart (2011)	Peak position
Australian Albums (ARIA)	2

=== Year-end charts ===
Chart (2011)	Position
Australian Albums (ARIA)	21
Australian Artist Albums (ARIA)	4

== Certification ==
Region	Certification	Certified units/sales
Australia (ARIA)	Platinum	70,000^{^}
^{^} Shipments figures based on certification alone.
