= 22 Steps =

Single by Damien Leith

from the album Where We Land
- B-side: "Song for Jarvis"; "Who You Are"
- Released: 21 July 2007 (Australia)
- Recorded: 2007
- Genre: Alternative rock
- Length: 3:34
- Label: Sony BMG
- Songwriters: Andy Stochansky, Ian LeFeuvre

Damien Leith singles chronology
"Night of My Life" (2006)	"22 Steps" (2007)	"All I Want Is You" (2007)

"22 Steps" is a song originally released by Canadian singer-songwriter Andy Stochansky on the 2002 album Five Star Motel. It was covered by Australian singer-songwriter Damien Leith and was the first single from his 2007 debut studio album Where We Land. The song was released on Australian radio on 22 June 2007, with a physical release on 21 July. The Australian release includes two B-sides, "Song for Jarvis" and "Who You Are". A bonus track, "I Still Miss Us", is available only at the Australian iTunes Store.

== Track listing ==
Australian CD single

1. "22 Steps" – 3:34
2. "Song for Jarvis" – 3:21
3. "Who You Are" – 3:35
4. "I Still Miss Us" (iTunes bonus track) – 4:18

== Charts ==
Chart (2007)	Peak position
Australian ARIA Singles Chart	11
ARIA Physical Singles Chart	3

== See also ==
- List of Australian Idol commercial releases
