= The Winner's Journey (Damien Leith album) =

Live album by Damien Leith
- Released: 9 December 2006 (Australia)
- Genre: Pop/Pop rock/Acoustic
- Label: Sony BMG Australia

Damien Leith chronology
The Winner's Journey (2006)	Where We Land (2007)

Professional ratings
Review scores
Source	Rating
Allmusic	2.5/5 stars

The Winner's Journey is a live album and DVD based on Australian Idol 2006 winner Damien Leith's performances on the show. The full-length album features remastered versions of Leith's live performances from the show, along with the studio version of his debut single "Night of My Life" and two of his original tracks, "Come to Me" and "Sky". The album was certified platinum on its first week release, and was certified four times platinum on its second week. It remained the number one album on the ARIA Charts for five weeks, and remained in the top ten for a total of ten weeks.

The album won an ARIA Music Award in October 2007, for "Highest Selling Album".

== Track listing ==
- CD
1. "Night of My Life" (studio version) - 3:34
2. "Come to Me" - 4:32
3. "Crying" - 1:49
4. "Wicked Game" - 3:18
5. "Nessun Dorma" - 3:00
6. "Hallelujah" - 2:31
7. "Message to My Girl" - 3:20
8. "If Tomorrow Never Comes" - 2:14
9. "Creep" - 1:45
10. "Unchained Melody" - 2:52
11. "Never Meant to Fail" - 2:32
12. "Waiting on an Angel" - 2:38
13. "Sky" - 3:31
14. "Night of My Life" (live version) - 3:31
- DVD
1. "With or Without You"
2. "Creep"
3. "If Tomorrow Never Comes"
4. "Sorry Seems to Be the Hardest Word"
5. "Celebration"
6. "Wicked Game"
7. "Sky"
8. "High and Dry"
9. "Message to My Girl"
10. "Crying"
11. "Hallelujah"
12. "Nessun Dorma"
13. "Unchained Melody"
14. "Never Meant to Fail"
15. "Waiting on an Angel"
16. "Night of My Life"
17. "Damien's Profile"
18. "Danny Boy"
19. "Come to Me"

== Charts ==
=== Weekly charts ===
Chart performance for The Winner's Journey
Chart (2006–2007)	Peak position
Australian Albums (ARIA)	1

=== Year-end charts ===
Chart (2006)	Position
Australian Albums (ARIA)	5

Chart (2007)	Position
Australian Albums (ARIA)	44

=== Decade-end chart ===
Chart (2000–2009)	Position
Australian Albums (ARIA)	61

== Certification ==
Region	Certification	Certified units/sales
Australia (ARIA)	6× Platinum	420,000^{^}
^{^} Shipments figures based on certification alone.
