= Remember June =

Studio album by Damien Leith
- Released: 9 October 2009 (Australia)
- Recorded: Sony BMG Music Studios, Sydney, 2009
- Genre: Pop rock, alternative rock, acoustic rock
- Length: 43:50
- Label: Sony BMG Australia
- Producer: Stuart Crichton

Damien Leith chronology
Catch the Wind (2008)	Remember June (2009)	Roy: A Tribute To Roy Orbison (2011)

Singles from Remember June
- 1. "To Get to You" Released: 25 September 2009; 2. "Forgive, Forget" Released: 2 April 2010

Remember June is the third studio album by Australian Idol 2006 winner Damien Leith. It was released by Sony BMG in Australia on 9 October 2009.

To celebrate the release of the album, two album launch shows were held, one in the State Theatre, Sydney on 16 October 2009 and one in Thornbury Theatre, Melbourne on 17 October 2009. Both shows received positive reviews.

== Track listing ==
1. "Remember June" – 2:07
2. "Golden Line" – 4:07
3. "To Get to You" – 3:35
4. "Wouldn't Change a Thing" – 4:03
5. "Don't Give Up" – 4:00
6. "Stay" – 3:06
7. "Forgive, Forget" – 3:32
8. "See You Again" – 3:29
9. "Sorry" – 3:22
10. "Unordinary World" – 4:02
11. "Goodnight" – 5:07
12. "For All of Time" – 3:26

== Charts ==
Remember June debuted and peaked on the ARIA charts at number 25 and spent 2 weeks in the Top 50.

=== Weekly charts ===
Chart performance for Remember June
Chart (2009)	Peak position
Australian Albums (ARIA)	25
