= Chapter Seven (album) =

Studio album by Damien Leith
- Released: 1 November 2013
- Label: Social Family Records
- Producer: Damien Leith

Damien Leith chronology
Now & Then (2012)	Chapter Seven (2013)	Songs From Ireland (2015)

Singles from Chapter Seven
- 1. "Without a Fight " Released: 13 September 2013; 2. "Halfway Heart"; 3. "You & I"

Chapter Seven is the seventh album by Australian Idol 2006 winner Damien Leith and released in November 2013. It was his first album released via Social Family Records. The album spawned three singles.

Leith performed "Without a Fight" live on The Morning Show on 5 November 2013.

== Background ==
Following the release of his 2012 album, Now & Then, Leith and Sony Music Australia parted ways and Leith took time out to write and record. Leith contacted producer and sound engineer David Nicholas (who has collaborated with musicians such as Elton John and INXS), who mixed the album and co-produced some of the tracks.

Gary Clark (collaborated with Natalie Imbruglia, The Wanted, The Veronicas) and Jon Vella (Meat Loaf, Ricky Martin) also contributed to the album along with Joe Melson. Damien said of this collaboration: "It’s been an absolute honour to work with Joe whose [sic] become a close friend and mentor".

Leith recorded the album in a small studio that he helped to build, and he did the recording and production work himself, saying "It's a fully independent album, this one. This is the first time I have really done it from start to end, every aspect of it. It has been brilliant, there has been lots to learn and a lot of hits and misses along the way. I think that's why I'm especially proud of this one."

A national tour was announced in August 2013, titled Without a Fight, The tour commenced in October 2013.

== Reception ==
Maggie Sapet from Myamn said: "The acoustic pop folk album that tells tales of love, life and everything in between uses predominantly acoustic guitar and drums to create songs that make you think and that you can relate to at the same time. After all, it is an album all about taking a leap of faith and believing in yourself. This is not only true for the album’s themes, but also Leith’s decision to go independent."

The Sound of Oz reviewed the album positively, saying, "His distinctive soaring voice is in fine form, but he’s learned to reign in his falsetto and use it only for effect. I’m not sure whether that’s about Damien developing as an artist, or if he simply knows that he doesn’t need to deliver the big crowd-pleasing notes that inspire people to pick up the phone anymore. Either way, the vocal performances in Chapter Seven feel really natural and honest." and "Leith wears his heart on his sleeve, and that’s so compelling. It’s impossible not to like an artist that so freely shares himself with his audience. He may not be reaching the masses that he did during his time on Idol, but with Chapter Seven Damien rewards anyone that’s willing to listen."

== Track listing ==
1. "Time to Go" (3:38)
2. "Last Sad Song" (4:23)
3. "Halfway Heart" (3:29)
4. "I Can Stop You Crying" (4:11)
5. "You and I" (3:15)
6. "See You Again" (3:47)
7. "Without a Fight" (3:27)
8. "Never Forget" (3:56)
9. "Stronger Than Superman" (3:46)
10. "Faith in Me" (3:43)
11. "A Million Reasons" (2:56)
12. "Lonely Nights" (2:55)

== Charts ==
Chapter Seven debuted and peaked on the ARIA charts at number 57.

=== Weekly charts ===
Chart (2012)	Peak position
Australian Albums (ARIA)	57
Australian Independent Albums (AIR)	6
