= Damien Leith =

Irish-Australian singer–songwriter (born 1976)

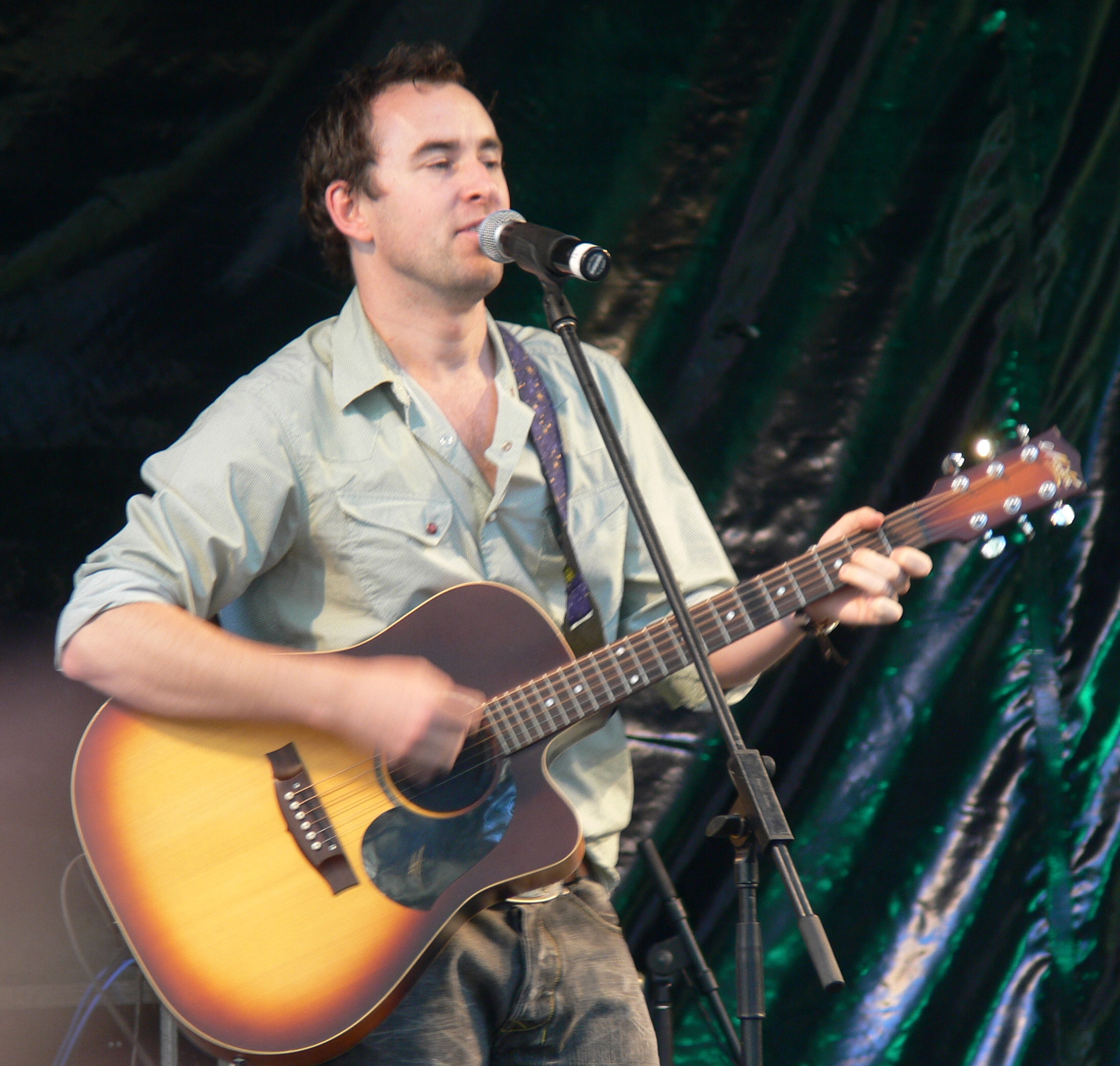
- Damien Leith performing at the Saint Patrick's Day Parade in Sydney, 2007.

Background information
- Born: Damien Leo Leith; 18 January 1976 (age 50); Dublin, Ireland
- Origin: County Kildare, Ireland
- Genres: Acoustic, folk, alternative rock, pop
- Occupations: Singer–songwriter, novelist, television presenter, chemist, radio announcer
- Instruments: Guitar, piano, vocals, keyboard
- Years active: 2006–present
- Labels: Social Family Records (2013–2014); Sony BMG Australia (2006–2010; 2015–); Sony BMG Ireland (2006–2013)
- Website: Official website

Damien Leo Leith (born 18 January 1976, in Dublin) is an Irish-Australian singer–songwriter. He was the winner of the Network Ten music contest Australian Idol in 2006. Since winning the title, Leith has released nine studio albums, four of which peaked in the top two of the ARIA Charts, including two number ones. He has been awarded seven platinum and one gold certification for albums and singles by ARIA, which equates to sales of just over half a million.

== Early life ==
As a teenager Leith formed a family band, "Leaf", with his sister Áine and brothers Paul and Darren. Leaf recorded in New York City and then again later under the new name "Releaf", which made an appearance in the Irish Top 100. After moving to Sydney, he played in a number of high-profile venues, as front-man for a band known as Revelate. His first Australian performance was at The Basement in Sydney's Circular Quay.

Before auditioning for Australian Idol, Leith worked in Sydney as a chemist with Pharmalab utilising the Bachelor of Science (Honours) in Chemistry he obtained from University College, Dublin and postgraduate experience within the Metallosupramolecular Research Group in the Chemistry Department of Trinity College, Dublin.

== Australian Idol 2006 ==
Only following determined coaxing by friends, Leith auditioned for the 4th series of Network Ten's Australian Idol along with some 25,000 other contestants. He was selected by the judges as one of the final 24 contestants, and was the first person voted into the competition's top 12 as the result of a nationwide viewer vote. He was praised by the show's judges for his falsetto technique, which he used regularly in performances. For the first time, Australian Idol 2006 permitted contestants to perform with instruments, and Leith accompanied himself on guitar for his renditions of Chris Isaak's "Wicked Game", Leonard Cohen's "Hallelujah", Alex Lloyd's "Never Meant to Fail" and Ben Harper's "Waiting on an Angel", and on piano for his rendition of Split Enz's "Message to My Girl". Leith also played piano for the non-competition round "Up Close and Personal" night, when he performed his original song "Sky".

Despite adverse comments from judges Mark Holden and Kyle Sandilands in relation to Leith's appearance and a performance of Kool and the Gang's "Celebration" on the "Disco" theme night, which drew ridicule from Holden, the judges' assessments of Leith's performances were usually positive with Holden labelling him a 'darkhorse' early in the competition. His renditions of Chris Isaak's "Wicked Game", Roy Orbison's "Crying", Leonard Cohen's "Hallelujah" and Puccini's "Nessun Dorma" each earned Leith a "Touchdown" from Mark Holden, Holden's ultimate accolade for an excellent performance.

Leith holds the record (with Australian Idol 2004 winner Casey Donovan) for being awarded the most touchdowns, at four apiece. Sandilands also stated that the family of Roy Orbison had contacted the Australian Idol producers requesting a copy of Leith's performance of "Crying". Although he was one of the most popular interviewees on Idol's behind-the-scenes show Idol Backstage, he was not expected by betting agencies to win the competition with Dean Geyer punted as the favourite to win throughout.

Leith is one of only few contestants to never land in the bottom 2 or bottom 3 throughout their series. During a live broadcast from the Sydney Opera House, Leith was announced the winner, over runner-up Jessica Mauboy. At age 30 at the time, Leith became the second oldest winner of any Idol series in the world. Controversy among viewers was created as Leith was not an Australian citizen at the time of winning the Australian Idol.

=== Australian Idol performances ===
Week	Theme	Song choice	Original artist	Result
Audition	-	"The Blower's Daughter"	Damien Rice	Advanced
Theatre Week	First Solo			Advanced
Theatre Week	Group Performance			Advanced
Theatre Week	Second Solo	"Hallelujah"	Leonard Cohen	Advanced
Top 24	none	"You Are So Beautiful"	Billy Preston	Advanced
Top 12	Contestant's Choice	"With or Without You"	U2	Safe
Top 11	Rock	"Creep"	Radiohead	Safe
Top 10	Number Ones	"If Tomorrow Never Comes"	Garth Brooks	Safe
Top 9	The Year They Were Born	"Sorry Seems to Be the Hardest Word"	Elton John	Safe
Top 8	Disco	"Celebration"	Kool & the Gang	Safe
Top 7	Acoustic	"Wicked Game" (Touchdown)	Chris Isaak	Safe
SPECIAL	Up Close & Personal	"Sky"	own composition	Safe
Top 6	Rock Swings	"High and Dry"	Radiohead	Safe
Top 5	ARIA Hall of Fame	"Message to My Girl"	Split Enz	Safe
Top 4	Viewer's Choice	"Crying" (Touchdown) "Hallelujah" (Touchdown)	Roy Orbison; Leonard Cohen	Safe
Top 3	Judges' Choice; Contestant's Choice	"Nessun Dorma" (Touchdown) "Unchained Melody"	Giacomo Puccini; Todd Duncan	Safe
Top 2	Contestant's Choice; Contestant's Choice; Winner's Single	"Never Meant to Fail" "Waiting on an Angel" "Night of My Life"	Alex Lloyd; Ben Harper -	Winner

== Post-Idol career ==
=== 2006: The Winner's Journey ===
Leith signed a recording contract with Sony BMG and his debut single, "Night of My Life", was released as a paid digital download from Bigpond Music soon after the conclusion of the grand finale, with an official CD release on 28 November, which included an original composition written and produced by Leith titled "Come to Me".

The single was certified "Gold" (35,000 copies sold) within 72 hours of its release. On 3 December 2006, the single debuted at number 1 and stayed in that position for 4 weeks, being accredited Platinum (70,000 copies shipped) in its first week of release. It was the fastest-selling debut single released during 2006, and also the most added song to radio. The video for "Night of My Life" debuted on national television on Saturday 9 December 2006. Set in the urban streets of Chippendale, New South Wales, the video was produced by Cutting Edge Productions.

Although with an official release date of 9 December, on 6 December 2006, Leith's CD/DVD pack entitled The Winner's Journey with all his Idol performances and two original tracks began appearing in non-ARIA accredited stores. The release debuted at number 3 with Platinum accreditation (70,000 copies shipped) on the ARIA Album Charts released on Sunday, 10 December 2006, and rose to number 1 on the following week, with 89,000 units sold and certified platinum four times (280,000 copies shipped). It sold a 2006 record of 101,206 units in the pre-Christmas week and continued to stay in the same position of number 1 for the next four weeks.

In late December 2006, Leith signed with Sony BMG Ireland and, on 18 January 2007, "Night of My Life" entered the Top 10 singles chart in Ireland. The next week it rose up two spots to the position of number 8. Leith performed in a nationally televised concert, Australia Day Live, on the eve of Australia Day in 2007, in the nation's capital, Canberra. He performed two songs, Peter Allen's "Tenterfield Saddler" with the Canberra Symphony Orchestra, and "Night of My Life".

In late February 2007, Leith embarked on a two-week, 14 show tour of major Australian East Coast cities. Labelled The Winner's Journey Tour, the concerts featured many of the songs performed by Leith during Australian Idol, as well as showcasing new original songs destined for his forthcoming studio album, including the folk/acoustic piece "Song for Jarvis", dedicated to his son, and "Beautiful", a band piece written by Leith during his trip to Ireland after winning Australian Idol. Supporting Leith on the tour was Sydney singer-songwriter and friend Mark Wilkinson.

On 22 February 2007, Leith was presented with two ARIA No. 1 Chart Awards for his first single "Night of My Life" and first album The Winner's Journey. These awards are presented to Australian artists whose singles and albums reach no. 1 on the ARIA national single and album charts over the thirteen months from December 2005 to December 2006.

In March 2007, Leith again performed "Night of My Life" and was nominated for "Spankin' New Artist" and "Best Male Artist" awards at the MTV Australia Video Music Awards 2007.

On 9 July 2007, Leith was nominated for a 2007 Helpmann Award in the category of Best Performance in an Australian Contemporary Concert (other nominees are David Campbell, Kylie Minogue and Olivia Newton-John). The annual Helpmann Awards recognise distinguished artistic achievement and excellence in the many disciplines of Australia's vibrant live performance sectors, including musical theatre, contemporary music, comedy, opera, classical music, dance and physical theatre. The Helpmann Awards, named in honour of Sir Robert Helpmann and to commemorate his memory and achievements, are similar to the Tony Awards on Broadway and the Olivier Awards in London. In early November 2007, Leith performed "22 Steps" on the TV soap opera Neighbours.

=== 2007–2008: Where We Land ===
Leith's second single "22 Steps" was released to Australian radio on 22 June 2007 and then was in stores on 21 July, which debut and peaked at number 11 on the ARIA Singles Chart. The studio album Where We Land followed and was released on 18 August 2007. It debuted at number one on 27 August in the ARIA Albums Chart. This is his second number one album within seven months. Damien is also the first Australian Idol winner to score two consecutive number 1 albums. Leith had an appearance on Rove on 26 August 2007 and he performed live during the semi-finals of Australian Idol 2007 on 30 August. The second single from the album is "All I Want Is You", which he performed on 8 October verdict show on Australian Idol 2007.

Leith embarked on a national Where We Land tour around Australia, performing his own material from the album, which began in November. The original schedule of the tour only included venues located along the east coast, but it was announced on 28 September that the tour will be extended to include Adelaide and Perth.

During February 2007, Leith signed a book deal with Australian publishers, HarperCollins. His first novel, written three years before entering Australian Idol, has been described by Leith as a psychological thriller set in Nepal. The novel, One More Time, was released on 1 October 2007.

In October 2007, Leith was nominated for three Australian ARIA Music Awards including; Best Breakthrough Single and Highest Selling Single for "Night of My Life", which he was unsuccessful in. He was also nominated for Highest Selling Album for The Winner's Journey, which he won.

In February 2008, Damien began hosting Network Ten's television series Saving Kids. It was filmed at Sydney Children's Hospital, allowing viewers to see medical miracles unfolding in the stories of children being treated for serious illnesses and horrific injuries. His song "Not Just for the Weekend" from his debut studio album served as the theme song and was released as a promotional single to promote the show.

=== 2008: Catch the Wind ===
On 26 April 2008, less than a year after the release of his first studio album, Where We Land, Leith released his second album, Catch the Wind: Songs of a Generation. The album contained his own interpretations of classic folk songs.

The album debut in the ARIA Albums Chart at number 3 on 4 May and rose to its peak at number 2 the next week held off the top spot by André Rieu and Mirusia's Waltzing Matilda. It was certified Gold in its third week. Leith performed a series of live shows across Australia for his Catch the Wind tour which began in May and ran until late July. The tour was up-close and personal set in small venues with only two other band members.

=== 2009: Remember June ===
Leith's third studio album, Remember June, was released in Australia on 9 October. It debuted at number 25 and spent two weeks in the ARIA Top 50 Albums Chart, and 3 weeks in the ARIA Top 20 Australian Artist Albums Chart. The first single from the album, "To Get to You", went to radio on 14 September, and was released 25 September. The second single "Forgive Forget" was released in April 2010. It reached No. 65 on the ARIA Singles Chart, No. 1 on the ARIA Physical Singles Chart, and No. 13 on the Australian Artists Single Chart. He has also released his second novel which has a father and son relationship plot, and was released by HarperCollins. The book is also called Remember June. His first novel, "One More Time" was published in 2007.

=== 2011: Roy ===
In an interview with Australian magazine New Idea, Damien mentioned he had recorded his fourth studio album in the United States. It was released on 15 April 2011. It is an album of Roy Orbison covers, entitled Roy, and was released to coincide with what would have been Orbison's 75th birthday. This album was produced by Barbara Orbison, Roy's widow, who died on 6 December 2011, aged 61. The album peaked at number 2, and spent 25 non-consecutive weeks on the ARIA Top 50 Albums Chart and gained platinum certification.

=== 2012–2014: Now & Then and Chapter Seven ===
On Friday, 20 April 2012, Damien's fifth studio album Now & Then was released. It debuted at number 14 and peaked at number 12 on the ARIA Charts, and spent four weeks in the top 50. Two singles, "Beautiful" and "Run", were released. Neither single impacted on the ARIA Charts. "Beautiful" was featured in an Estee Lauder TV commercial airing on various networks in the United States in late 2012.

On 1 November 2013, Damien's released a new album called Chapter Seven. It was preceded by single "Without a Fight", which was released on 13 September. Chapter Seven spent one week in the ARIA Top 100, peaking at number 57. Its three singles, "Without a Fight", "Halfway Heart" and "You and I" did not chart.

In May 2014, Leith released a new single titled "One and Only Mum".

In August 2014, Leith released a triple A-sided single of "Last Goodbye"/"Fields of Gold"/"Girl Back on Blue Bayou" via Leithal Enterprises with Joe Melson.

In November 2014, Leith released a Christmas extended play titled It's Christmas Time. It featured the traditional Christmas carols "Silent Night", "Jingle Bells", "It's Christmas Time", "Auld Lang Syne" and "Deck the Halls".

=== 2015-2017: Songs from Ireland ===
In February 2015, Leith announced his eighth album titled Songs from Ireland. The release reunites him with Sony Music Australia as he covers classic Irish songs including "Molly Malone", "Galway Girl" and "Wild Colonial Boy" and was released in March.

In 2016, Leith will travel Australia with the "Winner’s Journey: 10th Anniversary Tour". Leith said; "It is hard to believe that it has been 10 years since I first stepped onto the 'Australian Idol stage'. One thing is for certain, I wouldn’t be doing what I am today without all the amazing support from fans over the years. From my albums, to my books and concerts, you've been there all the way and I can't thank you all enough."

In January 2017, Leith won his first Golden Guitar award at the Country Music Awards of Australia winning Song of the Year for "Call Me Cray" which he co-wrote with Travis Collins. In 2017, Leith toured the 'Roy – A Tribute to Roy Orbison' show across Australia.

=== 2018: Damien Leith Storytime and Gospel ===
In 2018 Leith commenced a new project called 'Damien Leith Storytime' and features bedtime stories for kids. He released an EP in February. In August, Leith released his ninth studio album, Gospel; an album inspired by Elvis Presley.

As of late August 2018, Leith joined Muswellbrook-based radio station 98.1 Power FM as a breakfast announcer.

In 2020, Leith performed "Uninvited" with Greg Gould from Gould's album 1998.

== Personal life ==
He was born in Ireland and raised near Milltown, County Kildare. His father travelled as part of his work as an engineer, and their family lived in various countries including Libya and Botswana.

Leith later on emigrated to Australia where he married Eileen Stapleton, an Australian. They have two sons and a daughter. Leith became an Australian citizen on 25 January 2007, taking the pledge from then Prime Minister of Australia, John Howard, in a nationally televised broadcast on Network Ten. He currently lives in Wollongong, New South Wales and works as a radio announcer.

== Discography ==
Live and Studio albums

- The Winner's Journey (2006)
- Where We Land (2007)
- Catch the Wind: Songs of a Generation (2008)
- Remember June (2009)
- Roy: A Tribute to Roy Orbison (2011)
- Now & Then (2012)
- Chapter Seven (2013)
- Songs from Ireland (2015)
- Gospel (2018)
- Two of Us: The Songs of Lennon & McCartney (2020) (with Darren Coggan)
- Treasured Favourites (2020)
- Roy Orbison Orchestrated (2023)

== Awards and nominations ==
=== ARIA Music Awards ===
The ARIA Music Awards is an annual awards ceremony that recognises excellence, innovation, and achievement across all genres of Australian music

Year	Nominee / work	Award	Result	Ref.
2007	"Night of My Life"	Breakthrough Artist – Single	Nominated	
2007	"Night of My Life"	Highest Selling Single	Nominated	
2007	The Winner's Journey	Highest Selling Album	Won	
2011	Roy	Best Adult Contemporary Album	Nominated	

=== Country Music Awards of Australia (CMAA) ===
Collins has won eight awards at the Country Music Awards of Australia held annually in Tamworth since 1973.

Year	Nominee / work	Award	Result (wins only)	Ref.
2017	"Call Me Crazy" (Travis Collins, Damien Leith)	APRA AMCOS Song of the Year	Won	

=== Helpmann Awards ===
The Helpmann Awards is an awards show, celebrating live entertainment and performing arts in Australia, presented by industry group Live Performance Australia since 2001. Note: 2020 and 2021 were cancelled due to the COVID-19 pandemic.

Year	Nominee / work	Award	Result	Ref.
2007	The Winner's Journey - Live	Best Australian Contemporary Concert	Nominated	
2007	The Winner's Journey - Live	Best Performance in an Australian Contemporary Concert	Nominated	

=== MTV Australia Awards ===
The annual MTV Australia Awards were awards issued by MTV Australia from 2005 to 2009.

Year	Nominee / work	Award	Result	Ref.
2007	"Night of My Life"	Best Male Artist	Nominated	
2007	"Night of My Life"	Spankin' New Artist	Nominated	

Preceded by Kate DeAraugo	Australian Idol winner Season 4 (2006)	Succeeded by Natalie Gauci
Preceded by Alex Fevola & Arsen Kishishian	Dancing with the Stars (Australia) third place contestant Season 11 (2011 with Melanie Hooper)	Succeeded by Zoe Crammond & Aric Yegudkin
