= Night of My Life (Damien Leith song) =

Single by Damien Leith

from the album The Winner's Journey
- Released: 26 November 2006 (AUS)
- Genre: Pop
- Length: 3:34
- Label: Sony BMG
- Songwriter(s): Adam Reily

Damien Leith singles chronology
"Night of My Life" (2006)	"22 Steps" (2007)

"Night of My Life" is the debut single of 2006 Australian Idol winner Damien Leith. The song was performed by the final two contestants - Leith and Jessica Mauboy - during the penultimate episode of Australian Idol 2006, and both contestants recorded and had their versions pressed by Sony BMG, ready for the winner's version to be released immediately after the competition.

After Leith won the competition on 26 November 2006, the song was available online through Bigpond Music; Bigpond is a major sponsor of Australian Idol. The single was released on CD format on 28 November. The physical single contained a copy of Leith's original song "Come to Me".

The single was written by Adam Reily and is the first of the winner's singles to be penned by a local songwriter.

A music video was shot for the song on 28 November. In less than 72 hours of "Night of My Life" being on sale, the single was certified gold status. The single debuted at number one on the ARIA Singles Chart on 3 December, while certified platinum after one week of sales. It was the fastest selling debut single for 2006, and was the most added song to radio. The single was the first Australian act to reach the No. 1 spot since Youth Group's, "Forever Young" in April 2006. It remained at number one for five consecutive weeks. Despite being released at the end of 2006, the single's strong sales placed "Night of My Life" at number eleven in the 2006 End of Year Top 100 ARIA Singles Chart.

In mid-December, Jessica Mauboy's version of the song was released online by a New Zealand website which released it for legal download, even though she did not win Australian Idol. Shortly after, it was removed at the request of record label Sony BMG. However, it still remains available for illegal download online, and also remains available on the DVD accompaniment to her newly released album+DVD.

The single was later released in Ireland and debuted at number ten on 18 January 2007, rising to number eight the week after.

== Track listing ==
Australian CD single

1. "Night of My Life" (single edit)
2. "Come to Me"

== Charts ==
=== Weekly charts ===
Chart (2006)	Peak position
Australia (ARIA)	1
Ireland (IRMA)	8

=== Year-end charts ===
Chart (2006)	Position
Australia (ARIA)	11

== See also ==
- List of Australian Idol commercial releases
