= Songs from Ireland =

Studio album by Damien Leith
- Released: 13 March 2015 (Australia)
- Recorded: Dublin, Sydney
- Genres: Folk, Irish music
- Length: 55:06
- Label: Sony Music Australia

Damien Leith chronology
Chapter Seven (2013)	Songs from Ireland (2015)

Songs from Ireland is the eighth album by Australian Idol 2006 winner Damien Leith. It was released by Sony Music Australia on CD and digital download in Australia on 13 March 2015. The album debuted at No. 11 in Australia.

== Background ==
In November 2013, Leith released Chapter Seven independently after having released six albums and leaving Sony Music Australia earlier that year. Leith toured with this album throughout Australia in 2014.

In June 2014, Leith launched a one-man show at the Adelaide Cabaret Festival, titled The Parting Glass. The show is set in an Irish pub and features Leith's take on Irish music.

Leith said of the show; "It's set in Ireland in a pub and all the music is playing away. There's a father and a son catching up on lost time. I'm the father and the son and the singer in the band. It's demanding but we get a lot of laughs and then we see tears. It's one of those shows where something is gradually revealed and that (the tears) is exactly the response you want."

The Parting Glass received positive reviews and showcased Leith as not only a musician and singer, but as a burgeoning actor.

Leith said; "I went back through all the Irish songs I'd always loved and I made sure that in between each piece of script one of those classic songs, that I'd sung since I was a kid, was featured. It got an incredible review and I decided, there and then, that I wanted to record an album full of those songs; songs with great stories and long histories."

Leith resigned with Sony Music in late 2014. Leith stated he had enjoyed his foray into independent music, but to be re-signed with Sony, "[it] feels great".

Leith recorded the album in Sydney and in Ireland. "I always said if I was going to do an Irish album it had to be in Ireland." Leith told APN "You have to be surrounded by the whole environment to do it properly. And to work with my brothers and sisters again was the perfect way to do it." His sister Aine Coe sings on several tracks, while his younger brother played the drums and his older brother played guitar and photographed the album artwork.

"The main thing for me with this album," explains the singer, "is that I created something that was authentically Irish. It has all the traditional elements: the fiddle, flute, uilleann pipes and bodhran, all of those great sounds that make up traditional Irish music. I've tried to be as real as possible, whilst also being true to my style as well."

== Promotion ==
Leith released a promotional video for "Galway Bay" featuring Bing Crosby on 11 March.

On 17 March Leith performed "Galway Girl" on Today, and on 19 March he performed "Danny Boy" on The Morning Show.

== Reception ==
Alessandra D'Angelo from Renowned for Sound gave the album 3.5 out of 5, saying; "Even though Leith surely has a beautiful and expressive voice, this album doesn't convince me. The sound is too 'clean' to convey the heartfelt and involving strength of classical songs."

== Track listing ==
1. "Black Is the Colour" (featuring Sharon Corr) – 3:58
2. "Molly Malone" – 3:04
3. "Star of the County Down" – 3:55
4. "The Parting Glass" – 2:45
5. "Red Is the Rose" – 3:25
6. "Galway Girl" (featuring Sharon Shannon) – 3:03
7. "Raglan Road" – 4:02
8. "Rocky Road to Dublin" – 3:26
9. "Song for Ireland" – 3:26
10. "Danny Boy" – 3:45
11. "Wild Colonial Boy" – 4:40
12. "The Black Velvet Band" – 4:41
13. "Bright Blue Rose" (featuring Aine Coe) – 3:27
14. "Carrickfergus" – 4:25
15. "Galway Bay" (featuring Bing Crosby) – 3:04

== Charts ==
Songs from Ireland debuted on the ARIA charts at number 11.

=== Weekly charts ===
Chart (2015)	Peak position
Australian Albums (ARIA)	11

== Songs of Ireland Tour ==
A national Songs from Ireland tour was announced in February 2015. It will begin in May and conclude in September 2015.

== Release history ==
Region	Date	Format	Edition(s)	Label	Catalogue
Australia	13 March 2015	CD; digital download	Standard	Sony Music Australia	88875012932
