= Catch the Wind: Songs of a Generation =

Studio album by Damien Leith
- Released: 26 April 2008 (Australia)
- Genre: Pop, acoustic
- Label: Sony BMG Australia

Damien Leith chronology
Where We Land (2007)	Catch the Wind: Songs of a Generation (2008)	Remember June (2009)

Professional ratings
Review scores
Source	Rating
AllMusic	2/5 stars

Catch the Wind: Songs of a Generation is the second studio album (first cover album) by Australian Idol 2006 winner Damien Leith. It was released on 26 April 2008.

The album features 18 songs of Leith's interpretations from the 1960s and 1970s that inspired and captured his spirit at a young age. "The great songwriters of the 60s and 70s have always been a major influence on my own original material. In many ways the songs of that generation are as relevant today as they were back then. I've chosen songs that either mean a great deal to me on a personal level or those that I'd just love people to hear."

The album debuted at number three on the Australian ARIA Albums Chart, selling 9,688 copies in its first week. In the following week, in the lead up to Mother's Day, the album rose to number two. Selling over 17,000 units, the album lost the top position by less than 300 copies.

== Track listing ==
1. "Catch the Wind" (Donovan) – 2:19
2. "Annie's Song" (John Denver) – 2:30
3. "Wild World" (Cat Stevens) – 3:31
4. "If" (David Gates) – 3:16
5. "The Times They Are a-Changin'" (Bob Dylan) – 3:00
6. "Father and Son" (Stevens) – 3:20
7. "Vincent" (Don McLean) – 4:14
8. "Everybody's Talkin'" (Harry Nilsson) – 4:03
9. "Universal Soldier" (Buffy Sainte-Marie) – 2:18
10. "Guitar Man" (Gates) – 3:28
11. "Baby, I Love Your Way" (Peter Frampton) – 3:09
12. "Only Love Can Break Your Heart" (Neil Young) – 3:34
13. "Longer" (Dan Fogelberg) – 2:56
14. "Blowin' in the Wind" (Dylan) – 3:02
15. "Old Man" (Young) – 2:49
16. "And I Love You So" (McLean) – 3:03
17. "Sunshine on My Shoulders" (Denver) – 4:20
18. "Time in a Bottle" (Jim Croce) – 3:02

== Personnel ==
- David Anderson – Photography
- Glenn A. Baker – Liner Notes
- Jenifer Carmody – A&R
- James Patrick Cooper – Art Direction, Design
- Ross Fraser – Producer, A&R
- Paul Gray – Keyboards, Vocals (background), Producer
- Esther Coleman Hawkins – Choir Master
- Damien Leith – Guitar, Vocals, Producer
- Greg Royal – Bass
- Eric Aranda - Guitars

== Charts ==
=== Weekly charts ===
Weekly chart performance for Catch the Wind: Songs of a Generation
Chart (2008)	Peak position
Australian Albums (ARIA)	2

=== Year-end charts ===
Year-end chart performance for Catch the Wind: Songs of a Generation
Chart (2008)	Position
Australian Albums (ARIA)	41
Australian Artists Albums (ARIA)	9

== Certification ==
Region	Certification	Certified units/sales
Australia (ARIA)	Gold	35,000^{^}
^{^} Shipments figures based on certification alone.
