= Andy Stochansky =

Musician

- Occupations: Musician, singer-songwriter
- Instruments: Drums percussion vocals piano guitar

Andy Stochansky is a musician and songwriter from Toronto, Canada.

== Early years ==
Born and raised in Toronto, Stochansky began tinkering with the family piano at the age of five. To stop him from making music with anything he could get his hands on, his parents bought him a toy drum kit. By the time he was in his 20s, he had become a touring studio musician for Ani DiFranco. With DiFranco, Stochansky played 150 shows a year for seven years.

Stochansky attended, and graduated from, the Ontario College of Art & Design University (OCAD U).

== Solo career ==
Stochansky switched instruments, taking up guitar and piano, and released his solo debut album, Radio Fusebox. He next released 5 Star Motel on RCA Victor during the summer of 2001. The album was produced by Ian Lefevre, Dennis Herring and Tom Rothrock.

Radio Fusebox was awarded a 2000 Canadian Juno Award for Best Album Design to Creative Director Michael Wrycraft.

Stochansky chose Goo Goo Dolls frontman Johnny Rzeznik to produce his follow-up album, 100. The album was completed and mastered but never released by RCA records.

== Discography ==
- While You Slept (1996)
- Radio Fusebox (1999)
- Five Star Motel (2002)
- Shine EP (2004)
- 100 (2005)
- Debut (2020)
- Poetry of Birds (2025)
