= Lisa Mitchell discography =

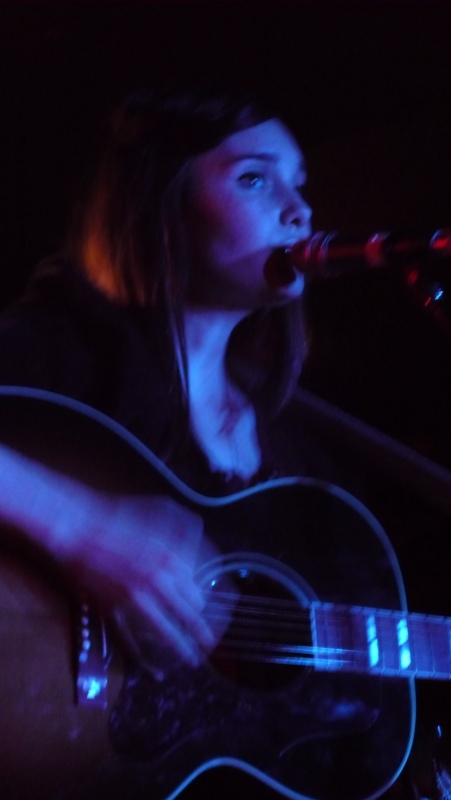
- Bushfire Benefit Concert at the Ding Dong Lounge in Melbourne, February 2009
- Studio albums: 4
- EPs: 4
- Singles: 18

The discography of English-born Australian singer-songwriter Lisa Mitchell. Mitchell finished sixth in the 2006 season of Australian Idol and subsequently signed a record deal with Warner Music Group and has released 3 top ten studio albums and 4 extended plays.

== Studio albums ==
List of albums, with selected chart positions and certifications
Title	Album details	Peak chart positions	Certifications (sales thresholds)
Title	Album details	AUS	Certifications (sales thresholds)
Wonder	Released: 31 July 2009; Format: CD, digital download; Label: Scorpio Music, Warner Music Australia (5186509532)	6	ARIA: Platinum
Bless This Mess	Released: 12 October 2012; Format: CD, digital download; Label: Warner Music Australia (5310549162)	7	
Warriors	Released: 14 October 2016; Format: CD, digital download; Label: Parlophone, Warner Music Australia (5419725532)	9	
A Place to Fall Apart	Released: 22 April 2022; Format: CD, digital download; Label: Believe	—	

== Extended plays ==
List of extended plays, with selected chart positions and certifications
Title	Album details	Peak chart positions
Title	Album details	AUS
Said One to the Other	Released: 4 August 2007; Format: CD, digital download; Label: Scorpio Music (SCORP001) / Warner Music Australia	27
Welcome to the Afternoon	Released: 31 May 2008; Format: CD, digital download; Label: Scorpio Music (SCORP003) / Warner Music Australia	93
Spiritus	Released: 4 May 2012; Format: CD, digital download; Label: Warner Music Australia	66
When They Play That Song	Released: 15 September 2017; Format: CD, digital download; Label: Parlophone / Warner Music Australia	—

== Singles ==
List of singles, with selected chart positions, showing year released and album name
Title	Year	Peak chart positions			Certifications	Album
Title	Year	AUS	GER	UK	Certifications	Album
"Incomplete Lullaby"	2007	—	—	—		Said One to the Other
"See You When You Get Here"	2008	—	—	—		Welcome to the Afternoon
"Neopolitan Dreams"	2008	70	33	156		Welcome to the Afternoon & Wonder
"Coin Laundry"	2009	28	—	—	ARIA: Gold	Wonder
"Clean White Love"	2009	—	—	—		Wonder
"Oh! Hark!"	2010	71	—	—		Wonder
"Maryanne" (Georgia Fair featuring Lisa Mitchell & Boy & Bear)	2011	—	—	—		Times Fly (Georgia Fair EP)
"Spiritus"	2012	91	—	—		Spiritus & Bless This Mess
"Bless This Mess"	2012	92	—	—		Bless This Mess
"Wah Ha"	2014	—	—	—		Non-album single
"Adeline" (Spirit Faces featuring Lisa Mitchell)	2015	—	—	—		Non-album single
"The Boys"	2016	—	—	—		Warriors
"Warhol"	2016	—	—	—		Warriors
"November" (Super Cruel featuring Lisa Mitchell)	2017	—	—	—		Non-album single
"California"	2017	—	—	—		When They Play That Song
"Stop"	2017	—	—	—		When They Play That Song
"Everything is Free"	2020	—	—	—		Non-album single
"Vital Signs" (with Mazde)	2021	—	—	—		Mazde (Mazde album)
"Zombie"	2021	—	—	—		A Place to Fall Apart
"I Believe in Kindness"	2022	—	—	—		A Place to Fall Apart
"Dreaming, Swimming"	2022	—	—	—		A Place to Fall Apart
"Summoning"	2022	—	—	—		A Place to Fall Apart
"—" denotes items which were not released in that country or failed to chart.
