= Andy Bull =

- Born: Andrew Bull
- Origin: Sydney, Australia
- Genres: Alternative pop, indie pop, alternative dance, synthpop
- Occupations: Singer-songwriter, producer
- Instruments: Piano, synthesizer, vocals, guitar, drums
- Years active: 2004–present
- Label: Island (AUS) Republic (USA)
- Website: andybullmusic.squarespace.com

Andy Bull is an Australian alt-pop singer-songwriter and producer, based in Sydney. He is best known for his singles "Dog", "Keep on Running" and "Baby I Am Nobody Now"; as well as his prolific Australian touring.

Bull also provides the singing voice to animated character, Jay, in the Netflix original cartoon series Beat Bugs.

== Career ==
=== 2004–2009: Early years and We're Too Young ===
Bull began performing in and around Sydney in the early 2000s. He signed to Island Records, a part of Universal Music Australia, in 2007. He supported Joss Stone on her Australian tour later that year. Bull release a 7" single of "We're Too Young", followed by "Small Town Girl," was released in August 2008. It was also released as a part of a four-track self-titled EP; which featured three original songs and a cover of "A Man Needs a Maid" by Neil Young.

Bull's debut album, We're Too Young, was released in August 2009. A music video was made for "Young Man," the third single from the album. Bull toured extensively in support of the album throughout the rest of 2008 and 2009, notably joining Tim Finn's national tour as an opening act, performing solo. He also opened for a MySpace secret show in Sydney featuring Duffy that same year.

In May 2009, Bull toured in support of Lisa Mitchell's Australian tour, prior to the July release of her debut album Wonder, fomenting Bull and Mitchell's friendship, which would lead to their collaboration on Bull's song "Dog" the following year.

=== 2010–11: Phantom Pains ===
In 2010, Bull began writing new material after relocating to Surry Hills. He was inspired to record a duet with Lisa Mitchell after performing a cover of Madonna's "Like a Prayer" with her and Lanie Lane at Sydney's Enmore Theatre during Mitchell's headlining performance at the venue. The resulting song was "Dog". Its popularity resulted in being featured in the Triple J Hottest 100 of 2010, charting at number 68.

"Dog," along with five other new songs, featured on Bull's Phantom Pains EP. He played piano, guitar and drums on the EP. He was also joined by former Red Riders guitarist Adrian Deutsh and Deep Sea Arcade/Tim Finn drummer Carlos Adura, as well as Deep Sea Arcade bassist Nick Weaver. Along with Mitchell, the EP also featured special guests Little Red and Hungry Kids of Hungary as Bull's backing band on the songs "Nothing to Lose" and "Last Waltz," respectively. A music video was made for the EP's title track, in which a man cuts off his thumb in order to get workplace compensation. The EP artwork was painted by Bull, and features a depiction of his left hand with a severed thumb.

In October 2010, Bull joined Clare Bowditch's national tour for a series of stops as her opening act, joining Augie March frontman Glenn Richards. For these dates, he was joined by Slow Down Honey guitarist Alex Bennison. Bull and Bennison did a small headlining tour in the following weeks, and later joined Canadian singer-songwriter Dan Mangan on the New South Wales leg of his national tour in January 2011. He also headed out on a headlining tour of the east coast with Melbourne singer Owl Eyes, titled the Bulls Eye Tour, in February.

Shortly after this, the second and final single from Phantom Pains was announced as "Last Waltz". Bull, Bennison and new drummer Dave Jenkins Jr. (also of Slow Down Honey, Young Romantics, Reece Mastin and Kirin J Callinan) visited the Triple J studios on 24 March 2011, to perform the song acoustically as a part of the station's "Like a Version" segment. The trio also performed a cover of Tears for Fears' "Everybody Wants to Rule the World." The segment and rendition were popularly received, and were later voted by a Triple J listener poll into the top five 'Like a Version' segments for 2011.

On 28 February 2011, Bull was a special guest on Channel 10 comedy panel show Good News Week. As one of the clues in deciphering a news story from the week, he performed a piano-based version of the Sex Pistols song "God Save the Queen." In early March 2011, Bull was also a part of a campaign for Australian tourism called "Making Tracks," in which he was paired with Taiwanese classical musician Irene Chan, from the YouTube Symphony Orchestra. The pair travelled to South Australia and the Northern Territory, in particular Kangaroo Island and Kings Canyon. The campaign involved a musical experiment, in which the two collaborated on a piece of music that reflected their journey. The video documentation of this has had over 100 thousand hits on YouTube.

Following this tour, Bull was asked to join his friends Hungry Kids of Hungary on their final Australian tour in support of their debut album, Escapades. Each night of the tour would see Bull performing with his band, as well as performing "Last Waltz" with Hungry Kids of Hungary during their headlining sets.

In June 2011, Bull played solo in support of Joshua Radin's Australian tour. In August/September 2011, Bull and his band headlined the official Phantom Pains tour of Australia, twelve months after The Phantom Pains EP was released.. The tour included sold-out shows at Good God in Sydney; the Northcote Social Club in Melbourne and The Spiegltent in Brisbane (as part of the 2011 Brisbane Festival).

In December 2011, Bull, Bennison and Jenkins performed at Your Festival in Newcastle, New South Wales, as well as three shows at the Woodford Folk Festival in Woodford, Queensland. At these shows, the trio performed a mix of new material and songs taken from Phantom Pains.

=== 2013–2019: Sea of Approval ===
In February 2013, "Keep On Running" premiered on Richard Kingsmill's music show. Bull is credited with production, and all instruments but drums. A video was also released for the single, directed by Nelson Alves. In June 2013, Bull signed to US Record Label Republic Records.

In July 2013, "Baby I Am Nobody Now," was released. Bull is credited with production and all instruments. A video was also released for the single, again directed by Nelson Alves. It features cameos from A Rational Fear creator Dan Ilic and Bluejuice frontman Jake Stone. The singles were toured throughout Australia. Bull's backing bands for these tours featured Bennison, Adura, Jenkins, Dappled Cities keyboardist Ned Cooke and former Hungry Kids of Hungary drummer Ryan Strathie.

Both "Keep on Running" and "Baby I am Nobody Now" featured in the Triple J Hottest 100 of 2013 at number 57 and number 81, respectively. "Keep on Running" was also featured in the 2CD compilation CD from the countdown.

In May 2014, Bull confirmed details of his second studio album. The album, entitled Sea of Approval, was released on 11 July 2014. The album features both "Keep on Running", "Baby I Am Nobody Now" and a third single, "Talk Too Much". The track was posted to SoundCloud later that day. A music video for the song was released on 3 July 2014. It featured TV presenter John Mangos and Australian singer-songwriter Megan Washington. The song was voted in at number 61 in the Hottest 100. Sea Of Approval was released on vinyl in 2020.

=== 2020–present: People You Love ===
In November 2020, Bull released the single "It's All Connected". In October 2022, Bull released "Something I've Been Thinking" as the third single from this forthcoming third studio album, People You Love, scheduled for release on 2 December 2022.

== Discography ==
=== Albums ===
List of albums, with release details shown
Title	Details
We're Too Young	Released: August 2009; Label: Island Records (2709321); Formats: CD, digital download
Sea of Approval	Released: January 2014; Label: Island Records (3791767); Formats: CD, digital download, LP
People You Love	Released: 2 December 2022; Label: Independent; Formats: Digital download, streaming
Collapse In Bliss	Released: 15 November 2024; Label: Independent; Formats: Digital download, streaming

=== EPs ===
List of EP, with Australian chart positions
Title	Album details	Peak chart positions
Title	Album details	AUS Physical
Andy Bull	Released: 2008	-
The Phantom Pains	Released: September 2010; Label: Island Records (2749188); Formats: CD, digital download	7

=== Singles ===
Title	Year	Album
"We're Too Young"	2008	We're Too Young
"Small Town Girl"	2008	We're Too Young
"Young Man"	2009	We're Too Young
"Dog" (with Lisa Mitchell)	2010	The Phantom Pains
"Last Waltz" (with Hungry Kids of Hungary)	2010	The Phantom Pains
"Keep on Running"	2013	Sea of Approval
"Baby I Am Nobody Now"	2013	Sea of Approval
"Talk Too Much"	2014	Sea of Approval
"Nothing Is Wrong"	2014	Sea of Approval
"It's All Connected"	2020	People You Love
"Baby I Am Nobody Now '22"	2022	Non-album single
"Slipping Away"	2022	People You Love
"The Jetty"(with Bec Sandridge)	2022	Non-album single
"Dying Star"	2022	People You Love
"Something I've Been Thinking"	2022	People You Love
"Define The Way You Feel"	2023	Non-album single
"If That's What You Want"	2023	Golden Boy
"Penny Drops"	2023	Non-album single
"Long Way Down"	2023	Golden Boy
"Big Deal"	2024	Collapse In Bliss
"Give and Take"	2024	Collapse In Bliss
"I Don't Know Why"	2024	Collapse In Bliss

== Awards and nominations ==
=== Vanda & Young Global Songwriting Competition ===
The Vanda & Young Global Songwriting Competition is an annual competition that "acknowledges great songwriting whilst supporting and raising money for Nordoff-Robbins" and is coordinated by Albert Music and APRA AMCOS. It commenced in 2009.

Year	Nominee / work	Award	Result
2014	"Baby I Am Nobody Now"	Encouragement Award	Won

== Backing band members ==
- Carlos Adura – drums (2009–2010, 2013–2014)
- Alex Bennison – guitar, backing vocals (2010–2019)
- Ned Cooke – keyboards, synthesizers, sequencer, backing vocals (2013–2015)
- Luke Hodgson – bass, vocals (2015–2019)
- Dave Jenkins Jr. – drums, percussion (2011–2013), bass (2013, 2014)
- Ryan Strathie – drums (2013, 2015–2019)
- Nick Weaver – bass (2010; died 2021)
