= Spiritus =

Spiritus (Latin for "spirit" or "breathing") may refer to:

- Spiritus lenis, the "soft breathing" in Byzantine Greek orthography
- Spiritus asper, the "hard breathing" in Byzantine Greek orthography
- Spiritus (journal), an academic journal devoted to the study of Christian spirituality
- Spiritus (novel), a 1996 novel by Ismail Kadare
- "Spiritus", a 1984 single by Jakarta
- Spiritus (EP) an extended play by Australian singer songwriter, Lisa Mitchell, 2012
  - "Spiritus" (song) a single by Lisa Mitchell from the 2012 EP
