= Energy (esotericism) =

Term used in esoteric forms of spirituality and alternative medicine

Proponents and practitioners of various esoteric forms of spirituality and alternative medicine refer to a variety of claimed experiences and phenomena as being due to an energy or force that defies measurement or experimentation, and thus are distinct from uses of the term energy in science.

Claims related to energy therapies are most often anecdotal, rather than being based on repeatable empirical evidence, thus not following the scientific method.

There is no scientific evidence for the existence of such energy, and physics educators criticize the use of the term energy to describe ideas in esotericism and spirituality as unavoidably confusing.

== History ==
The concept of esoteric energy has appeared in various cultures and spiritual traditions throughout history. Although interpretations differ, many traditions describe it as a vital force that animates living beings and permeates the cosmos. These ideas often overlap with religious, medical, and mystical frameworks, influencing practices ranging from healing to spiritual enlightenment.

In ancient civilizations, esoteric energy was frequently associated with breath, spirit, or divine power. The ancient Egyptians referred to ka, a vital essence that sustained life and represented a person’s spiritual double. In ancient Greece, the Stoics developed the concept of pneuma, a universal breath that pervades all existence, while Aristotle and Plato explored the idea of a world soul, or anima mundi, as the unifying force of nature. The Romans adopted similar notions through the term spiritus, which referred to both breath and an animating principle.

Many indigenous and shamanic traditions also describe energy in ways that influence their spiritual and healing practices. Native American belief systems frequently refer to a medicine energy that connects all living things, often associated with the guidance of spirit beings. Among the Yoruba, aṣẹ is regarded as a divine force that animates life and can be channeled through ritual and invocation. Similarly, in Polynesian traditions, mana is seen as a powerful spiritual energy that exists in people, objects, and the natural world.

=== Eastern traditions ===
Eastern traditions developed complex theories of energy as a subtle force flowing through the human body and the universe. In Taoist philosophy and Traditional Chinese Medicine, qi (气) was understood as a dynamic energy circulating through the body's meridians, influencing health and vitality. Eastern philosophy also includes the notion of "negative qi", typically understood as introducing negative moods like outright fear or more moderate expressions like social anxiety or awkwardness. Deflecting this negative qi through geomancy is a goal of feng shui.

The concept of qi also appears in the art of feng shui and Chinese martial arts. Practices such as acupuncture, tai chi, and qi gong were developed to regulate and cultivate this energy. The traditional explanation of acupuncture states that it works by manipulating the circulation of qi through a network of meridians. In tai chi, the ancient Chinese martial art, participants aim to concentrate and balance the body's qi, providing benefits to mental and physical health.

Similarly, in Hindu and Buddhist traditions, prana (Sanskrit: प्राण, prāṇa; the Sanskrit word for breath, "life force” or "vital principle") was described as the breath-based life force that moves through nadis, subtle channels that distribute energy throughout the body. In Hindu literature, prāṇa is sometimes described as originating from the Sun and connecting the elements. The practice of pranayama, a form of breath control, was believed to balance and enhance pranic energy. In Tibetan Buddhism, lung (རླུང་) refers to a form of wind-energy that plays a key role in meditation, visualization, and tantric yogic practices.

Japan also adopted energy concepts from China, referring to ki (気) as a life force that could be harnessed for healing, as seen in the development of Shugendō. Practitioners of Shugendō believe that ki/ritual energy is transmitted to the client via the palms of the practitioner’s hands. In yoga, Ayurveda, and Indian martial arts, it permeates reality on all levels, including inanimate objects.

=== Western conceptions ===
Western esotericism has incorporated energy concepts into its mystical and occult traditions. Medieval and Renaissance alchemy often described an inherent vital force that could transmute base materials into gold and refine the human soul. In the 18th century, Franz Mesmer ignited debate with his theory of animal magnetism, suggesting that an invisible magnetic fluid pervades living beings and could be manipulated for healing. Attention to vitalism grew in the 18th and 19th centuries. In the 19th century, the Theosophical Society introduced theories of etheric energy, the astral plane, and subtle bodies, which became influential in later esoteric and New Age movements. In the 20th century, the Austrian physician and psychoanalyst Wilhelm Reich, building on his mentor Sigmund Freud's core notion of libido, developed the concept of orgone energy, which he believed was a fundamental cosmic force that plays a role in physical and mental health.

=== In biology ===
As biologists studied embryology and developmental biology, particularly before the discovery of genes, a variety of organisational forces were posited to account for their observations. German biologist Hans Driesch (1867–1941), proposed entelechy, an energy which he believed controlled organic processes. However, such ideas are discredited and modern science has all but abandoned the attempt to associate additional energetic properties with life.

It is not the scientific concept of energy that is being referred to in the context of spirituality and alternative medicine. As Brian Dunning writes:

That's all that energy is: a measurement of work capability. But in popular culture, 'energy' has somehow become a noun. "Energy" is often spoken of as if it is a thing unto itself, like a region of glowing power, that can be contained and used. Here's a good test. When you hear the word "energy" used, substitute the phrase "measurable work capability". Does the usage still make sense? Remember, energy itself is not the thing being measured: energy is the measurement of work performed or of potential... Thus, this New Age concept of the body having an "energy field" is fatally doomed. There is no such thing as an energy field; they are two unrelated concepts.

Despite the lack of scientific support, spiritual writers and thinkers have maintained ideas about energy and continue to promote them either as useful allegories or as fact. The field of energy medicine purports to manipulate energy, but there is no credible evidence to support this.

== Conceptual frameworks ==
Esoteric traditions have developed various conceptual models to describe the nature, flow, and function of energy within the human body, the natural world, and the cosmos. These frameworks often include subtle bodies, energy centers, and channels through which energy is believed to move. Many of these ideas are found in religious, mystical, and alternative healing traditions, forming the foundation for practices such as yoga, meditation, alchemy, and energy healing.

The concept of subtle bodies appears across many traditions, referring to layers of existence beyond the physical body. In Hindu and Buddhist thought, the astral body (sūkṣma śarīra) and the causal body (kāraṇa śarīra) are described as non-material sheaths that house consciousness and energy. Theosophy expands on this idea, describing multiple energetic layers such as the etheric body, which is said to interface between the physical and astral realms. The aura, often depicted as a luminous field surrounding the body, is another widely recognized concept in spiritual traditions, believed to reflect an individual’s emotional, mental, and spiritual state.

Energy is often thought to flow through structured pathways within the body. Hindu and Buddhist traditions describe nadis, subtle channels through which prana moves, while Traditional Chinese Medicine speaks of meridians, pathways that distribute qi and regulate bodily functions. Tibetan Buddhism similarly identifies a system of tsa (channels), which direct lung (wind energy) throughout the body. In Western esotericism, alchemists and Hermeticists developed related ideas, proposing that spiritual energy circulates through subtle currents within the human microcosm, mirroring celestial movements.

Energy centers, often referred to as chakras, are believed to serve as focal points where energy gathers and transforms. Hindu and Tantric Buddhist traditions describe a system of seven primary chakras, each corresponding to different aspects of human consciousness and physiology, from the Muladhara (root) chakra at the base of the spine to the Sahasrara (crown) chakra at the top of the head. Each chakra is associated with specific elements, colors, and vibrational frequencies, and practices such as mantra recitation, visualization, and breath control are used to balance these centers. Western occultists, including figures from the Theosophical and Hermetic traditions, have adapted the chakra system into their mystical frameworks.

The role of breath is emphasized in many traditions as a means of controlling and directing energy. In pranayama, controlled breathing techniques regulate prana to cultivate spiritual and physical well-being. Similarly, qi gong and tai chi involve intentional breathwork to guide Qi and harmonize the body’s energy. These practices often intersect with meditation and visualization, creating a bridge between physical exercises and mystical states of awareness.

Another key aspect of esoteric energy frameworks is their connection to consciousness and transformation. Many traditions describe spiritual progress as a refinement of energy, where lower, denser energies are transmuted into higher states of awareness. Alchemical traditions, for example, speak of refining vital energy through symbolic processes like calcination, dissolution, and sublimation, ultimately leading to enlightenment. In Western occultism, energy manipulation is a key principle in ceremonial magic, where the practitioner directs subtle forces through will and intention.

== Locations ==
There are various sacred natural sites that people of different belief systems find numinous or have an "energy" with significance to humans. The idea that some kind of "negative energy" is responsible for creating or attracting ghosts or demons appears in contemporary paranormal culture and beliefs as exemplified in the TV shows Paranormal State and Ghost Hunters.

== See also ==
- Aether (classical element)
- Barakah
- Earth mysteries
- Ectoplasm (paranormal)
- Energy (psychological)
- Johrei
- Kirlian photography
- Kundalini
- Manitou
- Numen
- Odic force
- Orenda
- Shakti
- Silap Inua
