= All Through Winter =

Studio album by Georgia Fair
- Released: 21 October 2011
- Recorded: Echo Mountain Studios, Asheville, North Carolina, Glow in the Dark Studios, Atlanta, Georgia
- Length: 41:06
- Label: Sony Music Australia
- Producer: Bill Reynolds

Georgia Fair chronology
| All Through Winter (2011) | Trapped Flame (2013) |

All Through Winter is the debut studio album by Australian indie-folk duo, Georgia Fair. It was released on 21 October 2011 by Sony Music Australia, peaking at No. 61 on the ARIA Albums Chart and reaching No. 1 on the related ARIA Hitseekers Albums Chart. The album was recorded at the Echo Mountain Studios, Asheville, North Carolina and the Glow in the Dark Studios in Atlanta, Georgia and was produced by Bill Reynolds (Band of Horses). The group toured Australia to promote the album.

== Track list ==
| No. | Title | Length |
|---|---|---|
| 1. | "Times Fly" | 3:59 |
| 2. | "Blind" | 4:37 |
| 3. | "Where You Been?" | 2:57 |
| 4. | "My New Home" | 3:41 |
| 5. | "Float Away" | 4:42 |
| 6. | "Simple Man" | 3:29 |
| 7. | "Time" | 4:07 |
| 8. | "Remember Me" | 3:12 |
| 9. | "Halfway Gone" | 3:13 |
| 10. | "Morning Light" | 3:00 |
| 11. | "As The Sun Fades" | 4:02 |
| Total length: | | 41:06 |

== Personnel ==
Georgia Fair

- Jordan Wilson – vocals, acoustic guitar, harmonica
- Ben Riley – guitars, vocals

Additional musicians

- Bill Reynolds – bass, acoustic guitar, toms, keyboards, tambourine, omni-chord
- Tyler Ramsay – piano, mellotron, rhodes, omni-chord
- Seth Kauffman – drums, rhodes, electric guitar
- Brian Landrum – drums ("Where You Been?", "Float Away", "Halfway Gone")
- Mike Rhodes – drums ("Times Fly")
- Matt Goldman – drums ("Blind")
- Mike Brown – slide guitar, percussion, piano, banjo ("Where You Been?")

Recording

- Bill Reynolds – producer
- Danny Kadar, Matt Goldman, Jason Kingsland – engineer
- Matt Goldman – mixer
- Bob Ludwig – mastering
