= Raechel Whitchurch =

Australian country singer songwriter

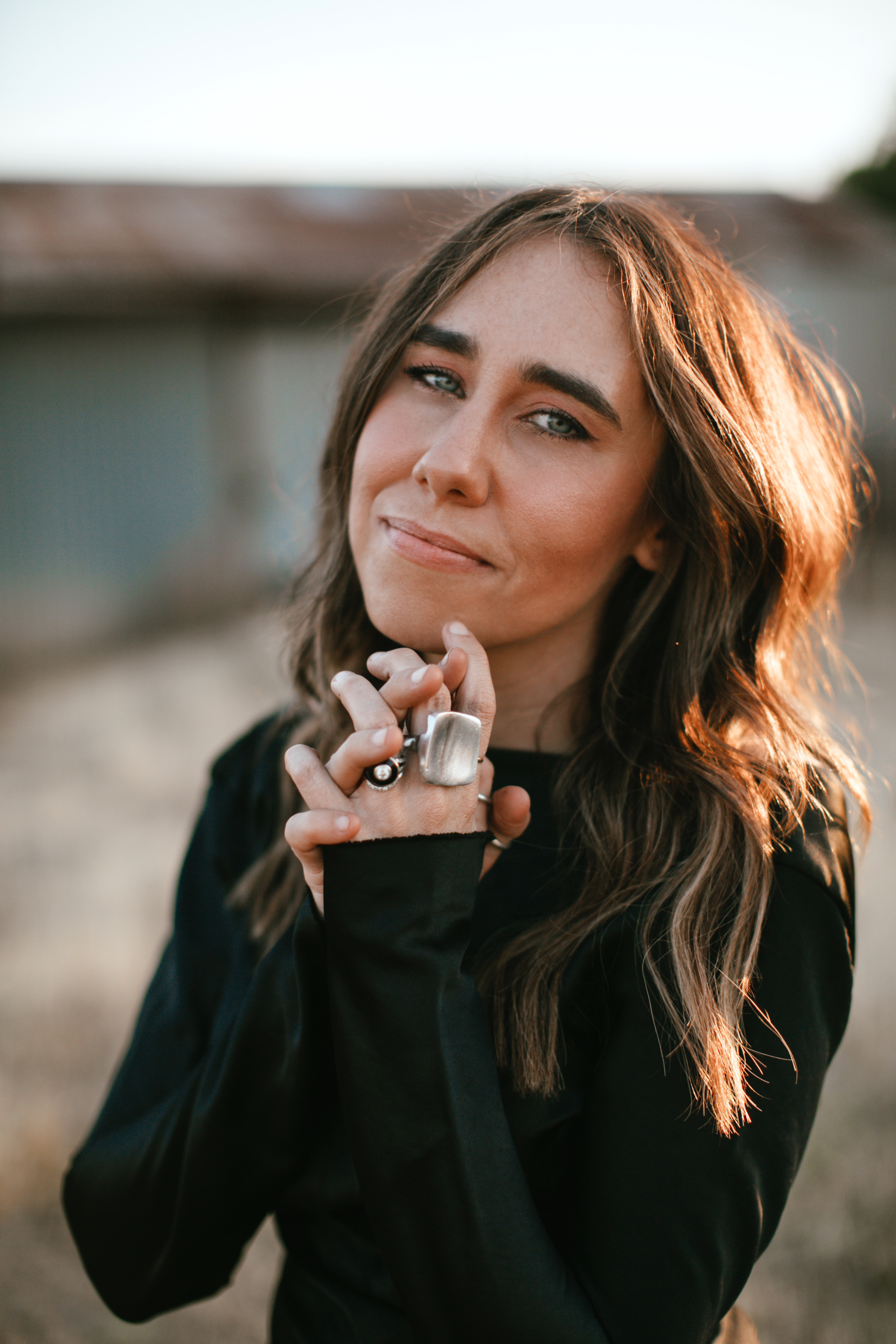

Background information
- Born: Raechel Angela Lee; 1986 or 1987 (age 38–39); Adelaide, South Australia, Australia
- Origin: Broken Hill, New South Wales, Australia
- Genres: Country, Alt-Country
- Occupation: Musician
- Instruments: Vocals; guitar; banjo; mandolin
- Years active: 1999–present
- Label: Compass Bros / Universal
- Formerly of: The Lees
- Partner: Ben Whitchurch (2010 - present)
- Website: raechelwhitchurch.com

Raechel Angela Whitchurch (born Raechel Angela Lee 26 April 1986 or 1987) is an Australian country music singer and songwriter. She started as a singer-guitarist in her family's travelling band, the Lees, in 1999. As a solo artist Whitchurch issued her debut album, Finally Clear, in April 2021.

== Biography ==
Raechel Lee was born on 26 April 1986 or 1987, into a country music family, and was raised in Broken Hill. Her father Stephen explained that he and wife Tracey were inspired by seeing Dead Ringer Band, back in 1993. For the next six years, the parents bought instruments and taught their children to play and sing. Initially they performed at small New South Wales towns during school holidays. From 1999, the whole family toured Australia as the Lees, with Stephen on lead guitar, Tracey on bass guitar, Raechel on vocals and guitar, brother Jarod on drums, sisters Faith and Savannah on vocals. In June 2005 the Lees appeared on Australian Broadcasting Corporation's rural TV programme, Landline, after six years of touring. The family relocated from Broken Hill to Parkes in early 2006. The Lees issued their third album of country, folk/roots music, Welcome Road in 2010 via Revolver Records. Previous albums are The Lees (2000) and Time to Kill (2006).

Lee reached the audition semi-final of Australian Idol in August 2006. With fellow Idol contestant, Lisa Mitchell, she performed gigs in rural New South Wales in April 2007. Lee resumed performing with her family's band. By July 2010 the singer had married Ben Whitchurch, who is also a musician. The Whitchurches moved to Sydney in 2011. As from May 2021 the couple have two children. In April 2016 Raechel Whitchurch released a four-track extended play, Outlaw, produced by Bill Chambers. Chambers issued his album, Cold Trail, in 2017. Whitchurch and Chambers undertook a combined tour to promote their respective releases during that year. Her debut album, Finally Clear was released in April 2021 and was produced by Matt Fell. It received two nominations for CMAA Golden Guitar Awards for New Talent and Traditional Country Album

== Discography ==
=== Studio albums ===
Raechel Whitchurch - Studio albums
Title	Producer	Details	Peak Chart Position
Finally Clear	Matt Fell	Released: 16 April 2021; Label: Compass Bros Record / Universal Music Australia; Formats: CD, vinyl, digital download, streaming	No. 1 Australia Country Album; No. 5 Country Album; No. 15 Australian Artist Album; No. 3 AIR Independent Label Album
What a Time to Be Alive	Matt Fell	Release 24 May 2024; Label: Compass Bros Records / Universal Music Australia; Formats: CD, vinyl, digital download, streaming	No. 1 Australian Country Album; No. 1 AIR Independent Label Album; No. 4 Australian Album; No. 14 Country Album

== Awards and nominations ==
=== Country Music Awards of Australia ===
The Country Music Awards of Australia is an annual awards night held in January during the Tamworth Country Music Festival. Celebrating recording excellence in the Australian country music industry. They commenced in 1973.

Year	Nominee / work	Award	Result	Ref.
2022	Finally Clear	Traditional Country Album	Pending	
2022	Raechel Whitchurch	Best New Talent	Pending	
2025	What a Time to Be Alive	Album of the Year	Pending	
2025	What a Time to Be Alive	Contemporary Country Album of the Year	Pending	
