= Bobby Flynn =

Australian singer-songwriter (born 1981)

- Flynn performing in 2008

Background information
- Born: Robert Andrew Flynn; 22 January 1981 (age 45); Brisbane, Queensland, Australia
- Genres: Acoustic, folk, art rock, alternative rock
- Years active: 2003–present

Robert Andrew "Bobby" Flynn (born 22 January 1981) is an Australian singer-songwriter. In the fourth season of the singing competition Australian Idol, he placed seventh.

With his band, The Omega Three, he made a nationwide tour through Australia in 2007, appearing in many regional centres including Burnie, Wagga Wagga, Townsville and Lismore.

== Early life ==
Flynn was born on 22 January 1981 in Brisbane, Queensland. The second child of 42-year-old Josephine and to 52-year-old Kevin, an accountant. Flynn and his elder sister Sarah were raised in Coorparoo in Brisbane's east in a middle-class Catholic family with eclectic musical influences. He was educated at St Joseph's College, Gregory Terrace in Spring Hill, Queensland.

== Australian Idol ==
Flynn performed his original composition "The Boy Had Trouble" in his Australian Idol (singing competition) audition in 2006, which landed him a spot in the Top 100. He was selected by the judges to go into the Top 24.

Flynn received his first "Touchdown" from Mark Holden in Week 5 (Disco Week) of the Finals, for his off-beat interpretation of Rick James' hit "Superfreak". Media coverage dubbed him a unique performer and 'revolution' for the idol competition.

Flynn was eliminated from the competition on 16 October, after performing "Rhiannon" by Fleetwood Mac. This came as a shock, as he had not landed in the bottom three before this, and had been widely touted both on the show and in the media as one of the strongest contenders. Flynn was invited back to the Tuesday night supplement to Idol, where he performed "The Boy Had Trouble".

=== Performances ===
- Brisbane auditions: "The Boy Had Trouble" (original composition)
- Theatre Round – Day two: "Beautiful Day" by U2
- Top 24: "Under the Milky Way" by The Church
- Week 1 – Contestant's Choice: "When the War Is Over" by Cold Chisel
- Week 2 – Rock: "Werewolves of London" by Warren Zevon
- Week 3 – #1 Hits: "Arthur's Theme (Best That You Can Do)" by Christopher Cross
- Week 4 – Contestant's year of birth: "Under Pressure" by Queen and David Bowie
- Week 5 – Disco: "Super Freak" by Rick James
- Week 6 – Acoustic: "Rhiannon" by Fleetwood Mac
- Week 6 – Up Close & Personal: "The Boy Had Trouble" by Bobby Flynn

== Releases ==
=== Albums ===
List of albums, with selected chart positions
Title	Album details	Peak chart positions
Title	Album details	AUS
Out Front	Released: February 2008; Label: Shock (LBB02); Formats: CD, digital download	53

=== EPs ===
List of Eps
Title	Album details	Peak chart positions
Title	Album details	AUS
Tonight (as Bobby Flynn & The Omega Three)	Released: 2003; Label: Regent Road Enterprises (RR002); Formats: CD	-

== Personal life ==
Flynn and his partner have two children; Indigo, born August 2008, and a second child born on 21 July 2011.
