= Coin Laundry (song) =

Single by Lisa Mitchell

from the album Wonder
- Released: 24 April 2009
- Genre: Pop
- Length: 3:12
- Label: Scorpio
- Songwriter: Lisa Mitchell
- Producer: Dann Hume

Lisa Mitchell singles chronology
"Neopolitan Dreams" (2008)	"Coin Laundry" (2009)	"Clean White Love" (2009)

"Coin Laundry" is a song performed and written by Australian singer–songwriter Lisa Mitchell from her first studio album, Wonder (2009). It was released as the lead single from the album on 24 April 2009 by Scorpio Music. The song was produced by Dann Hume and is about finding love at the coin laundry. "Coin Laundry" charted inside the top thirty in Australia and was nominated for an ARIA Award in late 2009. It placed at number 7 in the Triple J Hottest 100 of 2009.

== Writing and concept ==
Mitchell said that the concept of the song was developed when she was waiting for the spin cycle to finish in a coin laundry in South Melbourne, Australia. While at the coin laundry, Mitchell was doodling on a notebook and when she arrived home, she wrote the song from a verse she had written at the laundry. She explains:

I was thinking about love, of course, and if I'd ever find that special one. Maybe I'd find love right there in the coin laundry. I had a little stage-play going on in my head where this striking young man came in to do his washing. I would be putting coins into the machine and pretend to realise that I was a dollar short. I'd ask him if he had a dollar he could spare me as a way of getting the conversation rolling. Little did he know, there were a lot of other questions that I wanted to ask him.

When Mitchell and the songs producer Hume recorded "Coin Laundry" they began messing around with beats in Hume's studio one day and Mitchell started singing what she had written for "Coin Laundry". They were both pleasantly surprised and quite shocked at the sound they created so they built the song over it.

== Music video and chart performance ==
The song's music video was directed by Ness Casswill and stars Johnny Flynn who plays Mitchell's love interest. Mitchell had a fun time making the video and had to close the London laundromat off to the public for the filming.

In Australia, the song debuted at number seventy-one on the ARIA Singles Chart on the issue dated on 3 August 2009. Next week it raised to number forty-three, and within the next nine weeks it reached its peak position at number twenty-eight on 12 October 2009. It stayed in the top fifty for thirteen weeks, re-entering once, and stayed in the top one hundred for twenty-three weeks leaving the chart on 11 January 2010. "Coin Laundry" was nominated an ARIA Award for "Breakthrough Artist - Single" in 2009, but lost the award to "My Delirium" by Ladyhawke.

Chart (2009)	Peak position
Australian Singles Chart	28

=== Certifications ===
Region	Certification	Certified units/sales
Australia (ARIA)	Gold	35,000^{^}
^{^} Shipments figures based on certification alone.

== Track listing ==
- UK iTunes single
1. "Coin Laundry" (radio edit) – 2:59
2. "Time Means Nothing at All" – 3:46
3. "Coin Laundry" (Starsmith remix) – 4:49

== Release history ==
Region	Date	Label	Format	Catalogue
Australia	24 April 2009	Scorpio Music	Digital download	AU-WA0-09-00130
United Kingdom	23 October 2009	RCA Records	Digital download	
