= Neopolitan Dreams =

Song written by Australian singer

Single by Lisa Mitchell

from the EP Welcome to the Afternoon and the album Wonder
- B-side: "Fall in Line"
- Released: 2 August 2008
- Genre: Pop, indie folk
- Length: 3:30
- Label: Scorpio Music
- Songwriter: Lisa Mitchell
- Producer: Dann Hume

Lisa Mitchell singles chronology
"See You When You Get Here" (2008)	"Neopolitan Dreams" (2008)	"Coin Laundry" (2009)

"Neopolitan Dreams" is a song performed and written by Australian singer–songwriter Lisa Mitchell from her second extended play Welcome to the Afternoon (2008) and first studio album, Wonder (2009). It was released in August 2008 by Scorpio Music and peaked at number 70 on the Australian ARIA chart in August 2009, a year after it was first released.

The song sold 22,000 copies on iTunes alone after it was used in European commercials for Surf detergent, 3 mobile tv (UK) and Deutsche Telekom as well as in the US for cream cheese.

== Music video ==
The official music video was released on 5 September 2008.

== Track listing ==
- Australian iTunes single
1. "Neopolitan Dreams" – 3:30
2. "Fall in Line" – 2:45

== Charts ==
Chart performance for "Neapolitan Dreams"
Chart (2008–2009)	Peak position
Australia (ARIA)	70
Germany (GfK)	33

== Release history ==
Release history and formats for "Neapolitan Dreams"
Region	Date	Label	Format
Australia	2 August 2008	Scorpio Music	Digital download
United States	11 August 2009	Ugly Truth	Digital download
