= Warriors (Lisa Mitchell album) =

Studio album by Lisa Mitchell
- Released: 14 October 2016
- Genre: Pop
- Length: 40:15
- Labels: Warner Music Australia, PIAS
- Producer: Eric J Dubowsky

Lisa Mitchell chronology
Bless This Mess (2012)	Warriors (2016)	When They Play That Song (2017)

Singles from Warriors
- 1. "The Boys" Released: 5 August 2016; 2. "Warhol" Released: 14 October 2016

Warriors is the third studio album by Australian singer-songwriter Lisa Mitchell. It was released in Australia and New Zealand on 14 October 2016. The album was produced by Eric Dubowsky. The album was announced on 2 August 2016, with Mitchell stating: "This album is personal. There's a lot of thinking about my own kind of mythology – of myself, my life, why things are the way they are. And a lot of it is to do with childhood." Additionally, Mitchell told auspOp the album will be "sonically different" and dance had infiltrated her writing, adding "We really got rid of a lot of guitar and piano in this album."

The album's lead single "The Boys" was released on 5 August 2016, with the video premiering on YouTube on 1 August.

The album's second single "Warhol" was released on 14 October 2016, with a live video premiering on 6 October 2016.

== Critical reception ==
Professional ratings
Review scores
Source	Rating
Beat Magazine	3/4 stars
Herald Sun	3.5/5 stars
Rolling Stone Australia	3/5 stars

Cameron Adams from Herald Sun gave the album three-and-a-half stars out of five, saying: "Even on her most pop album, Lisa Mitchell is thankfully still a square peg. Fuelled by synths and beats more than her beloved acoustic guitars it's a modern sound that suits her trademark tender vocals. The autobiographical title track gives a shout out to Daniel Johns, "Unravelling" and "Josephine" bottle the Kate Bush-style mystery that, at age 26, she's already built a career on." Adams said the stand out was the 'dark cloud with tribal percussion' track, "So Wild".

Angela Christian-Wilkes from Beat Magazine said: "Warriors has a firm sense of direction and purpose." adding "While the album has deviated onto the path of pop stylings, there are plenty of returning motifs. The production works well with her signature vocals, melding beautifully with the underlying airy atmosphere. The storytelling is strong, Mitchell bringing in seemingly mundane details to etch out feelings and situations, and her songwriting style continues to shine through with the new sound. This being said, the stripped acoustic goodness of "What is Love" is a welcome return to her roots".

Gareth Hipwell from Rolling Stone Australia said: "Warriors finds Mitchell ditching much of the guitar and piano that has defined her sound." adding "With its understated electro groove and chiming synths, opener "The Boys" is quicksilver pop bliss veined with whimsy and surrender. Vocally, Mitchell is diaphanous and delicate as ever, while at the same time less fussy, less determinedly off-beat. The acoustic "What is Love" reminds that young love is perennially tedious, while the earnest "Where You Are" is a plaintive piano ballad per Bless This Mess. The dragging regression erodes gains won by the winning electro-pop feeling of preceding passages."

== Track listing ==
1. "The Boys" – 4:25
2. "Warriors" – 3:27
3. "Warhol" – 3:40
4. "Unravelling" – 3:20
5. "So Wild" – 3:59
6. "I Remember Love" – 3:50
7. "What Is Love" – 5:11
8. "Where You Are" – 3:38
9. "Josephine" – 4:00
10. "Love, Death X" – 4:45

== Charts ==
Chart performance for Warriors
Chart (2016)	Peak position
Australian Albums (ARIA)	9
