= Bless This Mess (Lisa Mitchell album) =

Studio album by Lisa Mitchell
- Released: 12 October 2012
- Recorded: 2012; The Stables Recording Studio
- Genre: Pop, folk
- Length: 53:39
- Label: Warner Music Australia
- Producer: Dann Hume

Lisa Mitchell chronology
Spiritus (2012)	Bless This Mess (2012)	Warriors (2016)

Singles from Bless This Mess
- 1. "Bless This Mess" Released: 28 August 2012

Bless This Mess is Lisa Mitchell's second studio album. It was released in Australia and New Zealand on 12 October 2012. A national album tour started on 18 October 2012. The album debuted at #7 on the ARIA Charts on 21 October 2012.

"Bless This Mess" was released as a single, prior to the release of the album. It peaked at number 92 on the ARIA singles chart.

== Track listing ==
No.	Title	Length
1.	"Providence"	5:09
2.	"So Much to Say"	4:33
3.	"Spiritus"	3:09
4.	"The Land Beyond the Front Door"	2:42
5.	"The Story of the Raven and the Mushroom Man"	4:19
6.	"Bless This Mess"	3:45
7.	"Better Left Unsaid"	4:38
8.	"The Present"	3:40
9.	"Walk with Me"	4:15
10.	"You Pretty Thing"	2:59
11.	"Diamond in the Rough"	4:08
12.	"I Know You're Somewhere"	10:22

== Charts ==
Chart performance for Bless This Mess
Chart (2022)	Peak position
Australian Albums (ARIA)	7
