= Oh! Hark! =

Single by Lisa Mitchell

from the album Wonder
- B-side: "Romeo and Juliet"
- Released: 2 April 2010
- Genre: Pop
- Length: 3:48
- Label: Warner Music Australia
- Songwriter(s): Lisa Mitchell
- Producer(s): Dann Hume

Lisa Mitchell singles chronology
"Clean White Love" (2009)	"Oh! Hark!" (2010)	"Spiritus" (2012)

"Oh! Hark!" is a song performed and written by Australian singer–songwriter Lisa Mitchell. The song was released in April 2010 as the third and final single from her debut studio album, Wonder (2009). The track peaked at number 71 on the ARIA Chart.

At the ARIA Music Awards of 2010, the song earned Mitchell a nomination for Best Female Artist, losing to Megan Washington's I Believe You Liar.

== Music video ==
The official music video was released on 9 March 2010.

== Track listing ==
1. "Oh! Hark!" (single Version) – 3:48
2. "Romeo and Juliet" – 4:48
3. "Oh! Hark!" (Ou Est Le Swimming Pool Remix) – 3:58

== Charts ==
Chart performance for "Oh! Hark!"
Chart (2010)	Peak position
Australia (ARIA)	71

== Release history ==
Release history and formats for "Oh! Hark!"
Region	Date	Label	Format
Australia	2 April 2010	Warner Music Australia	Digital download
