= Spiritus (song) =

Single by Lisa Mitchell

from the album Spiritus and Bless This Mess
- Released: 27 March 2012
- Studio: The Stable Studios, Melbourne
- Genre: Pop
- Length: 3:07
- Label: Warner Music Australia
- Songwriter(s): Lisa Mitchell
- Producer(s): Dann Hume

Lisa Mitchell singles chronology
"Oh! Hark!" (2010)	"Spiritus" (2012)	"Bless This Mess" (2012)

"Spiritus" is a song performed and written by Australian singer–songwriter Lisa Mitchell. The song was released on 27 March 2012 as the lead single from her third extended play, Spiritus. It was also included on her second studio album, Bless This Mess. The track peaked at number 91 on the ARIA Chart.

In an interview with Tom and Alex on Triple J on 27 March 2012, Mitchell said; "Spiritus means breath in Latin and I've been doing a lot of yoga lately and a lot of breathing; that's the main thing you concentrate on. That's sort of one component of the song but I guess it was a bit of a message to my former self. Almost something you wish you told yourself a couple of years ago, which is mainly to have some perspective. There is an epic sun out there and it's all good."

== Promotion ==
Mitchell performed the track live for Triple J on 12 June 2016, in the Nova FM studio on 14 June 2016 and again under the Sydney Harbour Bridge on 21 April 2013.

== Music video ==
The official music video was released on 2 May 2012.

== Reception ==
Anna Gilfillan from Ripe Music wrote: ""Spiritus" has a more mainstream radio feel to it than her previous songs, yet Mitchell still manages to inject her kooky personality into the music" adding "With the combination of the piano and drums creating an extremely catchy sound, it will have you dancing around your living room." In a review of the associated EP, Stephen Benko-Nehme from LipMag said: "Spiritus" has as "..utterly irresistible piano riff, is so summery and joyful; upon hearing the song it’s almost impossible not to close one's eyes and simply smile."

== Charts ==
Chart performance for "Spiritus"
Chart (2010)	Peak position
Australia (ARIA)	91
