= Georgia Fair =

- Origin: Sydney, Australia
- Genres: Indie, folk rock
- Years active: 2007–present
- Members: Jordan Wilson; Benjamin Riley

Georgia Fair is an Australian music duo comprising Jordan Wilson and Benjamin Riley. Their debut album, All Through Winter, was released in October 2011, which peaked in the top 100 of the ARIA Albums Chart and reached No. 1 on the related ARIA Hitseekers Albums Chart. Their second album, Trapped Flame (October 2013), also reach the ARIA top 100.

== History ==
Wilson and Riley met in high school at the age of 13, they began playing and writing music together and would continue to do so in various incarnations, until settling on Georgia Fair shortly after they left school. The band's name is said to have come from a venue of one of their first shows mistakenly billing "Jordan and Ben" as Georgia Fair due to a bad phone connection.

In 2010 Jordan and Ben hooked up with Bill Reynolds of Band of Horses to record what would end up being their debut LP All Through Winter. Commencing tracking in Asheville, North Carolina, the pair travelled with Reynolds to Austin, Texas and then Atlanta, Georgia where the record was completed.

The pair recorded their second LP in Los Angeles with producer Ted Hutt titled Trapped Flame, which was released in October 2013.

The band has since commenced work on a follow-up record, working out of studio usually occupied by fellow Sydney band The Preatures. A single, "Break", and a subsequent video was released in October 2014.

== Discography ==
=== Albums ===
List of albums, with selected chart positions
Title	Album details	Peak chart positions
Title	Album details	AUS
All Through Winter	Released: October 2011; Format: CD, digital download; Label: Sony Music Australia (88697979152)	61
Trapped Flame	Released: October 2013; Format: CD, digital download; Label: Sony Music Australia (88883773622)	66
The World's Awake	Released: 16 January 2020; Format: Digital download, streaming; Label: Self-released	— (Note: The World's Awake did not enter the ARIA Albums Chart, but peaked at number 21 on the ARIA Digital Album Chart.)

=== Extended plays ===
List of extended plays, with selected details
Title	Album details
Georgia Fair	Released: 2009; Format: CD, digital download; Label: Georgia Fair (FAIR1)
Times Fly	Released: 2010; Format: CD, digital download; Label: Sony (88697788982)

=== Singles ===
Year	Single	Album
2009	"Picture Frames"	Georgia Fair EP
2010	"Little While"	—
2010	"Times Fly"	Times Fly EP
2011	"Marianne" (featuring Lisa Mitchell and Boy & Bear)	Times Fly EP
2011	"Where You Been?"	All Through Winter
2012	"Simple Man"	All Through Winter
2012	"Blind"	All Through Winter
2013	"Love Free Me"	Trapped Flame
2014	"Are We Not Alive"	Trapped Flame
2014	"Break"	Non-album singles
2015	"Last Chance"	Non-album singles
2016	"Saviour Behaviour" (Paul Conrad featuring Georgia Fair)	Non-album singles
2017	"Slave to Nothing"	The World's Awake
2018	"Bloodline"	The World's Awake
