= Said One to the Other =

Said One To The Other

EP by Lisa Mitchell
- Released: 4 August 2007
- Recorded: Broken Door Studio, Sydney
- Genre: Folk
- Length: 15:21
- Label: Scorpio Music; Warner Music
- Producer: Dann Hume

Lisa Mitchell chronology
Said One To The Other (2007)	Welcome to the Afternoon (2008)

Said One To The Other is the debut EP release by artist Lisa Mitchell. The EP was released in Australia in late August 2007.

The songs, "Slow" and "Alice in Wonderland", have also been called "Sailing Softly" and "Alice" respectively. The songs feature vocals, guitar and additional instruments. "Incomplete Lullaby" was written for piano and vocals in contrast to her signature acoustic songs, with guitar-only accompaniment.

== Track listing ==
1. "Slow" – 4:06
2. "Incomplete Lullaby" – 3:45
3. "Sometimes I Feel Like Alice" – 3:59
4. "All I Know" – 3:31

All songs written by Mitchell excluding "Incomplete Lullaby" (written by Mitchell and Dann Hume, of Evermore fame). Vocals and guitar are all by Mitchell, and piano & percussion by Dann Hume.

== Charts ==
The EP made its debut in the ARIA Singles Chart at number twenty-seven on 20 August 2007.

Chart (2007)	Peak position
ARIA Top 100 Singles	27
ARIA Top 20 Australasian Singles	7
