= Australian Idol season 4 =

Australian Idol
- Season 4
- Hosted by: Andrew G James Mathison
- Judges: Kyle Sandilands Marcia Hines Mark Holden
- Winner: Damien Leith
- Runner-up: Jessica Mauboy
- Finals venue: Sydney Opera House

Release
- Original network: Network Ten
- Original release: 6 August – 26 November 2006

Season chronology
- ← Previous; Season 3 Next → Season 5

- Australian Idol (season 4)
- Contestants (with dates of elimination)
Damien Leith	Winner
Jessica Mauboy	Runner-Up
Dean Geyer	13 November
Chris Murphy	6 November
Ricky Muscat	30 October
Lisa Mitchell	23 October
Bobby Flynn	16 October
Lavina Williams	9 October
Guy "Mutto" Mutton	2 October
Klancie Keough	25 September
Reigan Derry	18 September
Joseph Gatehau	11 September

The fourth season of Australian Idol began on 6 August 2006 and concluded on 26 November.

== Overview ==
=== Format changes ===
Changes for the fourth season of Australian Idol included the cancellation of "Inside Idol", "streamlined" semi-finals (replaced with a variant of the 12 females, 12 males format popularised by American Idol), and the contestants were able to bring instruments with them on stage for some of the final shows. The fourth season's television promos promised a change in the viewers' role in the show, which was revealed to be an SMS service called 199-JUDGE which allows viewers to SMS their opinions on the judges' reactions.

=== Ratings ===
The show opened with average ratings (1.4 million) that were on the whole up from the previous year's ratings. The semi-final shows averaged 1.5 million viewers per night; the ratings remained consistent until the Top 8 show, which averaged 1.89 million viewers, much higher than any of the Top 12 shows the previous year, making it the most watched show on Australian television for that week. The Top 7 Show, which was "acoustic night", was watched by 1.92 million and the final by over 2.1 million people, with the audience peaking at 10.13pm (Australian Eastern Standard Time) attracting 2.4 million viewers.

== Auditions ==
The auditions for the fourth season of Australian Idol started in March 2006 in Mount Isa, Queensland, and concluded on 4 June 2006 in Sydney. Auditions were held in thirteen towns and cities across Australia: Adelaide, Albury-Wodonga, Alice Springs, Brisbane, Broken Hill, Byron Bay, Hobart, Melbourne, Mount Isa, Newcastle, Perth, Sydney, and Townsville. Many of the audition sites had a much smaller population than previous seasons' sites, and producers declared that they wanted to "unearth" rural talent in 2006. The auditions identified 124 hopefuls who then participated in a culling process in Sydney. After group performances and a solo performance from each contestant, the judges cut down the number of contestants to 24. For the first time, contestants were told face-to-face and usually by themselves whether they had made it through to the semi-finals (in contrast to previous years when contestants were divided into groups of three, two of whom got through).

The fourth season's broadcasts began on Sunday 6 August 2006 with the broadcast of four audition shows and two shows for the Sydney round.

== Semi-finals ==
The semi-final process consisted of two male groups and two female groups of six contestants over four days, who performed in front of a live audience for the first time (this being the first season in which the semi-finals included a live audience). The semi-finals began on Sunday 27 August 2006 and ran daily until the results show on Thursday 31 August 2006. Two contestants were selected by audience vote each show. Eight contestants were then selected by the judges for another semi-finals show the following week D.ring the following results show, each judge selected a favorite wildcard contestant, who joined a single wildcard contestant selected by audience vote and the previously selected eight contestants to make up the Top 12.

Females	Males
Atlanta Coogan	Brendon Boney
Lydia Denker	Bobby Flynn
Reigan Derry	Joseph Gatehau
Jessica Griffin	Dean Geyer
Klancie Keough	Chris Graffiti
Raechel Lee	Damien Leith
Jessica Mauboy	Chris Murphy
Lisa Mitchell	Ricky Muscat
Lyndelle Palmer-Clarke	Guy "Mutto" Mutton
Rebecca Pearce	James Steele
Amanda Streete	Paul Vercoe
Lavina Williams	Nathaniel Willemse

=== Top 24 boys ===
GROUP 1 ~ Sunday 27 August 2006

- Chris Murphy - "Crazy Little Thing Called Love" by Queen
- Nathaniel Willemse - "Vertigo" by U2
- Paul Vercoe - "Hanging by a Moment" by Lifehouse
- Damien Leith - "You Are So Beautiful" by Joe Cocker"
- Brendan Boney - "Higher Ground" by Stevie Wonder
- Dean Geyer - "If You Could Only See" by Tonic
Advancing to the Top 12: Damien Leith and Dean Geyer

Wild Card Contenders: Chris Murphy, Nathaniel Willemse & Brendon Boney

GROUP 2 ~ Tuesday 29 August 2006

- Mikey O'Neill - "I Can Hear Music" by The Beach Boys
- James Steele - "Kryptonite" by 3 Doors Down
- Chris Graffiti - "I Don't Want to Be" by Gavin DeGraw
- Bobby Flynn - "Under the Milky Way" by The Church
- Joseph Gatehau - "Let Me Love You" by Mario
- Guy "Mutto" Mutton - "Meant to Live" by Switchfoot
Advancing to the top 12: Bobby Flynn and Joseph Gatehau

Wild Card Contenders: Ricky Muscat, Chris Graffiti & Guy Mutton

=== Top 24 girls ===
GROUP 1 ~ Monday 28 August 2006

- Lyndelle Palmer-Clarke - "Would I Lie to You? by The Eurythmics
- Klancie Keough - "Not Ready to Make Nice" by The Dixie Chicks
- Jessica Mauboy - "I Wanna Dance with Somebody" by Whitney Houston
- Atlanta Coogan - "My Immortal" by Evanescence
- Amanda Streete - "Trouble" by Pink
- Reigan Derry - "I Wish I Was a Punk Rocker" by Sandi Thom
Advancing to the top 12: Jessica Mauboy and Reigan Derry

Wild card contenders: Klancie Keough and Amanda Streete

GROUP 2 ~ Wednesday 30 August 2006

- Raechel Lee - "Dumb Things" by Paul Kelly
- Lavina Williams - "Natural Woman" by Aretha Franklin
- Rebecca Pearce - "Show Me Heaven" by Maria McKee
- Jess Griffin - "Fighter" by Christina Aguilera
- Lisa Mitchell - "Diamonds on the Inside" by Ben Harper
- Lydia Denker - "One Moment in Time" by Whitney Houston
Advancing to the top 12: Lavina Williams and Lisa Mitchell

Wild Card Contenders: none

=== Wildcards ===
- Brendon Boney - "Lonely No More" by Rob Thomas / "This Love" by Maroon 5
- Nathaniel Willemse - "My Girl" by The Temptations
- Klancie Keough - "Redneck Woman by Gretchen Wilson
- Chris Graffiti - "I Wish" by Stevie Wonder
- Guy "Mutto" Mutton - "Black Fingernails, Red Wine" by Eskimo Joe
- Amanda Streete - "On My Mind" by Powderfinger
- Ricky Muscat - "Caught Up" by Usher
- Chris Murphy - "Holy Grail' by Hunters & Collectors

Advancing to the top 12: Ricky Muscat, Guy Mutton, Klancie Keough and Chris Murphy

== Weekly Song Themes ==
Date	Week	Theme
11 September	Top 12	Contestant's Choice
18 September	Top 11	Rock
25 September	Top 10	Number Ones
2 October	Top 9	The Year They Were Born
9 October	Top 8	Disco
16 October	Top 7	Acoustic*
23 October	Top 6	Rock Swings*
30 October	Top 5	Aria Hall of Fame*
6 November	Top 4	Audience Choice*
13 November	Top 3	Judge's Choice

* Shows in which the contestants brought instruments onto the stage with them.

== The Top 12 contestants ==
=== Damien Leith ===
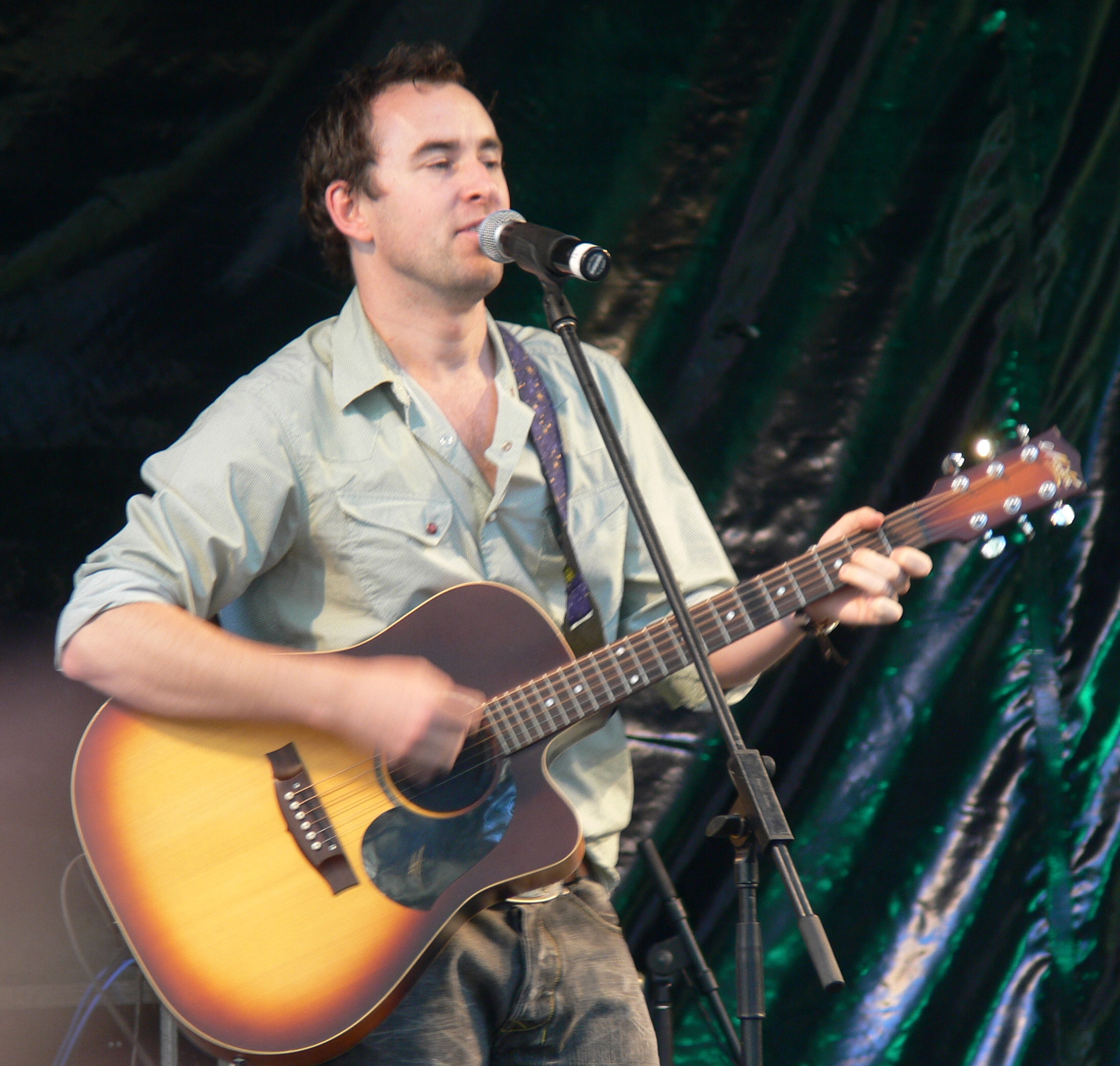
Damien Leith

Damien Leith (born 18 January 1976) was the winner for 2006. Originally from Dublin, Ireland and raised in County Kildare, he moved to Sydney, prior to Idol. He and his Australian born wife, Eileen, have two sons. Leith scored four of Mark Holden's Touchdowns over the course of the series and was the only contestant in the show's history to score two in one night when he scored one for each of his top 4 performances.

Audition: "The Blower's Daughter" by Damien Rice
Theatre Week (Round 3): "Hallelujah" by Leonard Cohen
Top 24: "You Are So Beautiful" by Joe Cocker
Top 12: "With or Without You" by U2
Top 11: "Creep" by Radiohead
Top 10: "If Tomorrow Never Comes" by Garth Brooks
Top 9: "Sorry Seems to Be the Hardest Word" by Elton John
Top 8: "Celebration" by Kool & the Gang
Top 7: "Wicked Game" by Chris Isaak TOUCHDOWN
Up Close & Personal: "Sky" (own composition)
Top 6: "High and Dry" by Radiohead and Jamie Cullum
Top 5: "Message to My Girl" by Split Enz Bottom 3
Top 4: "Crying" by Roy OrbisonTOUCHDOWN, "Hallelujah" by Leonard Cohen TOUCHDOWN
Top 3: "Nessun Dorma" by Giacomo Puccini, "Unchained Melody" by The Righteous Brothers TOUCHDOWN
Top 2: "Never Meant to Fail" by Alex Lloyd, "Waiting on an Angel" by Ben Harper, "Night of My Life" (winner's single)

=== Jessica Mauboy ===
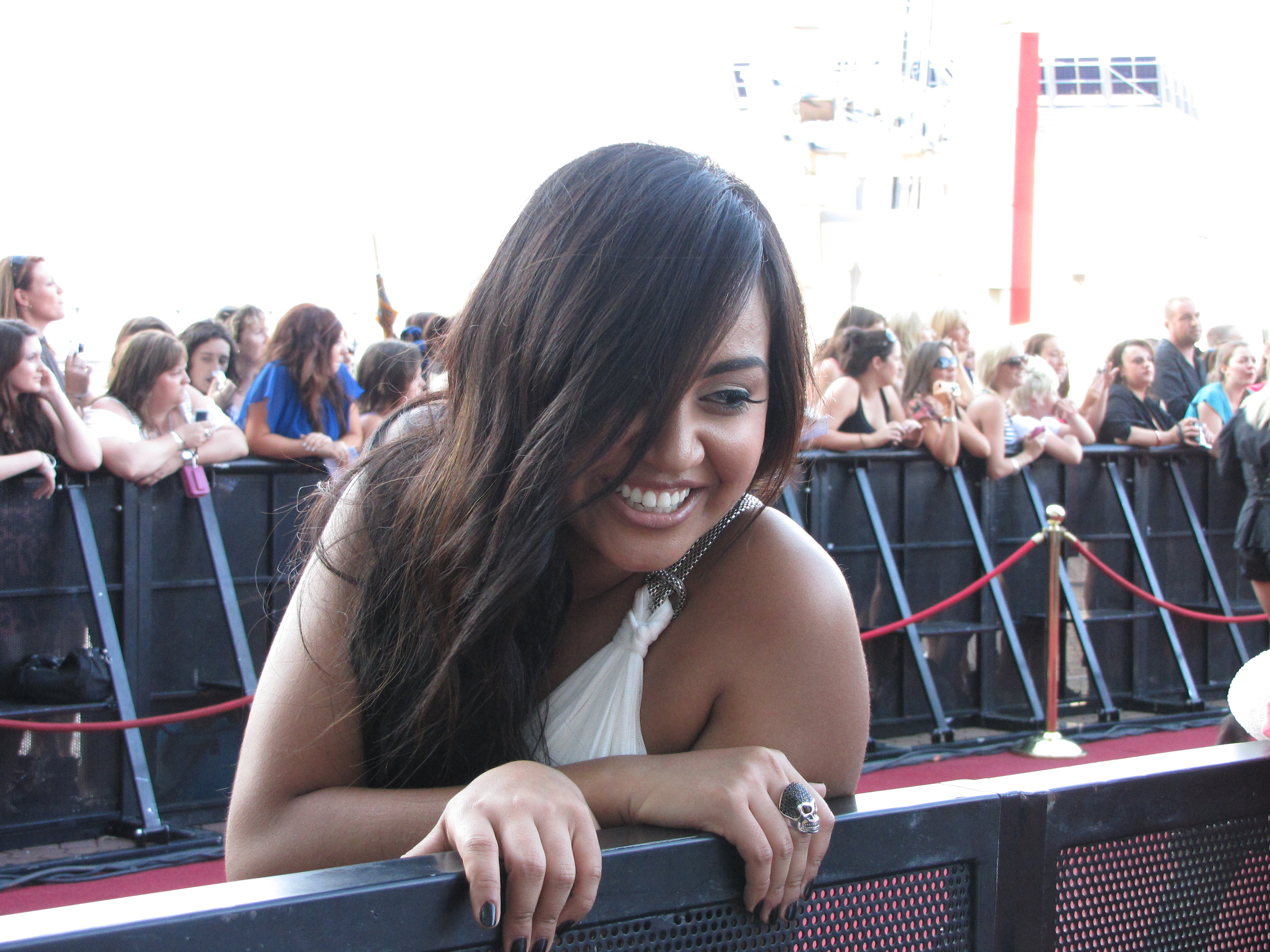
Jessica Mauboy

Jessica Mauboy (born 4 August 1989) was the runner-up for 2006. Hailing from Darwin, Northern Territory, a high school student, she auditioned in Alice Springs. Mauboy received the first Touchdown of the year from Mark Holden for her performance of "Beautiful" by Christina Aguilera during the Top 10-week. She received a second Touchdown during the Top 5-week for her performance of "Words" by The Bee Gees.

Audition: "I Have Nothing" by Whitney Houston
Theatre Week (Round 3): "Impossible" by Christina Aguilera
Top 24: "I Wanna Dance with Somebody" by Whitney Houston
Top 12: "Stickwitu" by The Pussycat Dolls
Top 11: "Walk Away" by Kelly Clarkson
Top 10: "Beautiful" by Christina Aguilera TOUCHDOWN
Top 9: "Another Day in Paradise" by Phil Collins Bottom 3
Top 8: "On the Radio" by Donna Summer
Top 7: "Have You Ever?" by Brandy
Up Close & Personal: "What the World Needs Now" by Burt Bacharach & Hal David
Top 6: "Crazy in Love" by Beyoncé Knowles
Top 5: "Words" by The Bee Gees TOUCHDOWN
Top 4: "Butterfly" by Mariah Carey, "Karma" by Alicia Keys
Top 3: "When You Believe" by Mariah Carey & Whitney Houston, "To Sir, with Love" by Lulu
Top 2: "Impossible" by Christina Aguilera, "Together Again" by Janet Jackson, "Night of My Life" (winner's single)

=== Dean Geyer ===
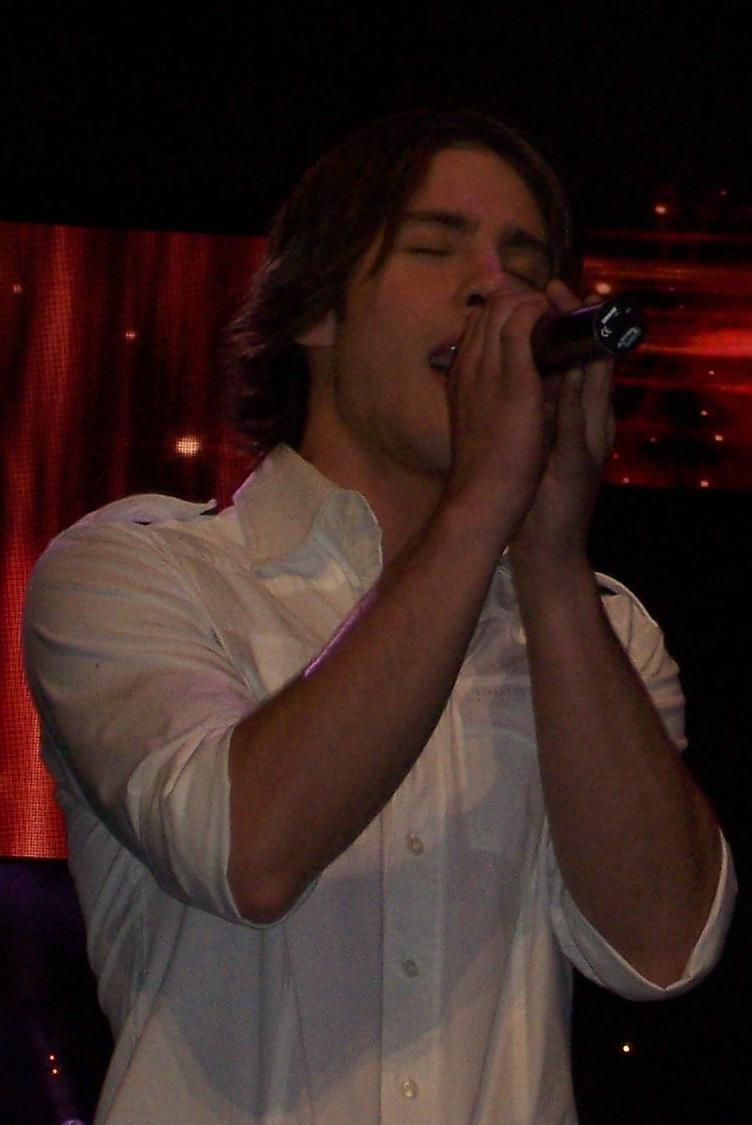
Dean Geyer

Dean Geyer (born 20 March 1986) finished in third place. Born in Johannesburg, South Africa, Geyer auditioned successfully in Melbourne.

Audition: "Walking in Memphis" by Marc Cohn
Top 24: "If You Could Only See" by Tonic
Top 12: "For You I Will" by Teddy Geiger
Top 11: "Shimmer" by Fuel
Top 10: "Iris" by Goo Goo Dolls Bottom 2
Top 9: "You Give Love a Bad Name" by Bon Jovi
Top 8: "Turn the Beat Around" by Vicki Sue Robinson
Top 7: "On the Way Down" by Ryan Cabrera TOUCHDOWN
Up Close & Personal: "Change" (own composition)
Top 6: "Mustang Sally" by Wilson Pickett Bottom 2
Top 5: "Every Time You Cry" by John Farnham & Human Nature Bottom 2
Top 4: "Dare You to Move" by Switchfoot, "Saving Me" by Nickelback Bottom 2
Top 3: "Waiting on the World to Change" by John Mayer, "I'll Be" by Edwin McCain TOUCHDOWN Eliminated

=== Chris Murphy ===
Chris Murphy (born 25 March 1976) finished in fourth place. Auditioning in his hometown of Perth, Western Australia, Murphy, like his younger brother, Courtney Murphy (from Season 2), was unanimously invited through to the theatre rounds.

Audition: "She Talks to Angels" by The Black Crowes
Top 24: "Crazy Little Thing Called Love" by Queen
Wildcard: "Holy Grail' by Hunters & Collectors
Top 12: "Wish You Well" by Bernard Fanning
Top 11: "Is It Just Me?" by The Darkness
Top 10: "Against All Odds" by Phil Collins
Top 9: "Life in the Fast Lane" by The Eagles
Top 8: "Play That Funky Music" by Wild Cherry Bottom 2
Top 7: "No More Lonely Nights" by Paul McCartney
Up Close & Personal: "Diamond Days" (own composition)
Top 6: "You Shook Me All Night Long" by AC/DC
Top 5: "Evie" by Stevie Wright TOUCHDOWN
Top 4: "Something Beautiful" by Robbie Williams, "Mean to Me" by Crowded House Eliminated

=== Ricky Muscat ===
Ricky Dean Muscat (born 19 October 1983 in Darwin), from Werribee, Melbourne, Australia, placed fifth. Of Maltese descent, Muscat lives with his mother, and works at a chemical factory. From age 9, he would often accompany his father, a drummer, to the local pub where he would sing '60s hits for the locals. Muscat sangShai's "If I Ever Fall in Love" at the Melbourne auditions, winning the judges over to make the Top 124 in Sydney. Following a controversial falling out on day two of the theatre round with trio member Jorge Bec, Muscat gained a place in the Top 24. During the first semi final round, he did not accrue enough votes to advance but was later chosen by the judges as a wildcard.

Audition: "If I Ever Fall in Love" by Shai
Top 24: "So Sick" by Ne-Yo
Wildcard: "Caught Up" by Usher
Top 12: "Walking Away" by Craig David
Top 11: "Take Me Out" by Franz Ferdinand Bottom 2
Top 10: "Hard to Say I'm Sorry" by Chicago
Top 9: "Down Under" by Men at Work
Top 8: "Get Down on It" by Kool & the Gang Bottom 3
Top 7: "Feel" by Robbie Williams Bottom 3
Up Close & Personal: "Off the Wall" by Michael Jackson
Top 6: "I Saw Her Standing There" by The Beatles Bottom 3
Top 5: "To Love Somebody" by The Bee Gees

=== Lisa Mitchell ===
Lisa Mitchell (born 22 March 1990 in Canterbury, England), came in sixth place. Originating from Albury, New South Wales, Miller immediately wowed the judges with her unique voice and talent.

Audition: "Collide" by Howie Day, "See it in Your Eyes" (own composition)
Top 24: "Diamonds On the Inside" by Ben Harper
Top 12: "Fall at Your Feet" by Crowded House
Top 11: "Dancing with Myself" by Billy Idol
Top 10: "A Thousand Miles" by Vanessa Carlton
Top 9: "The Joker" by Steve Miller Band Bottom 2
Top 8: "Heart of Glass" by Blondie
Top 7: "See You Soon" by Coldplay Bottom 2
Up Close & Personal: "Too Far Gone" (own composition)
Top 6: "Revolution" by The Veronicas Eliminated

=== Bobby Flynn ===
Bobby Flynn (born 22 January 1981 in Brisbane, Queensland), finished seventh.

Audition: "The Boy Had Trouble" (own composition)
Theatre Week (Round 3): "Beautiful Day" by U2
Top 24: "Under the Milky Way" by The Church
Top 12: "When the War Is Over" by Cold Chisel
Top 11: "Werewolves of London" by Warren Zevon
Top 10: "Arthur's Theme (Best That You Can Do)" by Christopher Cross
Top 9: "Under Pressure" by Queen & David Bowie
Top 8: "Super Freak" by Rick James TOUCHDOWN
Top 7: "Rhiannon" by Fleetwood Mac Eliminated
Up Close & Personal: "The Boy Had Trouble" (own composition)

=== Lavina Williams ===
Lavina Rose Williams (born 13 June 1978) finished eighth in the contest. She is of Samoan descent and the older sister to Season 3 runner-up Emily Williams. In high school, she became a member of the New Zealand R&B girl group, Ma-V-Elle with hits that charted successfully in New Zealand. As a professional stage performer, Williams played the role of Shenzi in The Lion King from 2004 to 2006.

In February 2007, Williams took over Ricki-Lee's spot in Young Divas temporarily while Coulter went overseas to record her second studio album. In 2009, Williams featured on her brother, J.Williams single, "Stand With You" charting successfully well in New Zealand.

Top 24: "(You Make Me Feel Like) A Natural Woman" by Aretha Franklin
Top 12: "If I Ain't Got You" by Alicia Keys Bottom 2
Top 11: "Bring Me to Life" by Evanescence
Top 10: "Don't Leave Me This Way" by Thelma Houston Bottom 3
Top 9: "Too Much Heaven" by The Bee Gees
Top 8: "Best of My Love" by The Emotions Eliminated

=== Guy "Mutto" Mutton ===
Guy Mutton (born 17 October 1976) nicknamed "Mutto", finished in ninth place. A rock enthusiast, Mutton was teaching but with his bandSoulframe rising in popularity and gaining national recognition, he was encouraged to focus on music.

Audition: "All I Want Is You" by U2
Top 24: "Meant to Live" by Switchfoot
Wildcard: "Black Fingernails, Red Wine" by Eskimo Joe
Top 12: "Where the Streets Have No Name" by U2
Top 11: "Clocks" by Coldplay Bottom 3
Top 10: "The Reason" by Hoobastank
Top 9: "Dream On" by Aerosmith Eliminated

=== Klancie Keough ===
Klancie Keough (born in 1982 in Mount Isa, Queensland,), placed tenth. At the Mount Isa auditions, Keough was the first successful contestant into the Top 124 in Sydney, and later the top 24. She did not initially make the top twelve, but returned for the wildcard show and was chosen by the public vote.

Keough is a farm hand and jillaroo on her sister's farm. Before auditioning for Idol, she completed senior studies at The Cathedral School in Townsville and studied Commerce at The University of Queensland in Brisbane. After working in finance, she returned to work as a governess on her sister's property. In December 2006, Keough was signed by the man behind Keith Urban's success, Greg Shaw, to a management deal.

Audition: "Always on My Mind" by Elvis Presley / Willie Nelson
Top 24: "Not Ready to Make Nice" by the Dixie Chicks
Wildcard: "Redneck Woman" by Gretchen Wilson
Top 12: "Jolene" by Dolly Parton
Top 11: "Keep Your Hands to Yourself" by The Georgia Satellites
Top 10: "(If You're Not in It for Love) I'm Outta Here!" by Shania Twain Eliminated

=== Reigan Derry ===
Reigan Elisse Derry (born 19 September 1988) finished in eleventh place. Born in Maida Vale, Western Australia, Derry attended Perth Modern School on a vocal scholarship. Prior to Idol, she was a member of a duo called Djreamz with Justin Low. Her eclectic musical tastes include jazz and drum and bass, and she is an enthusiast of music from the 1960s. It has been perceived that her elimination on 18 September was the result of a too obscure song choice.

Audition: "I Know You by Heart" by Eva Cassidy, "Life Ain't Easy" by Cleopatra
Top 24: "I Wish I Was a Punk Rocker (With Flowers in My Hair)" by Sandi Thom
Top 12: "Breathe in Now" by George Bottom 3
Top 11: "Themata" by Karnivool Eliminated

=== Joseph Gatehau ===
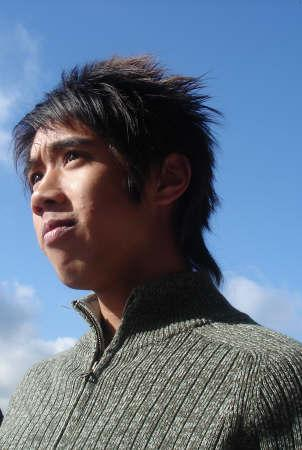
Joseph Gatehau

Joseph Gatehau (born 30 March 1988 in New South Wales), finished in twelfth place. Of Tongan and New Caledonian descent, he is the oldest of seven children. From the age of 8, Gatehau has played acoustic guitar and sung, but as the family was not able to afford formal music lessons until he was 14, he is essentially self-taught.

Gatehau later released an album called "Move On" made with Donald Tauvao aka Boy Shy from The X Factor winning band Random" in 2005. He was also a contestant on The X Factor in a group called Three Wishez.

Audition: "Pretty Girl" (own composition)
Top 24: "Let Me Love You" by Mario
Top 12: "Right Here Waiting" by Richard Marx Eliminated

== Grand final ==
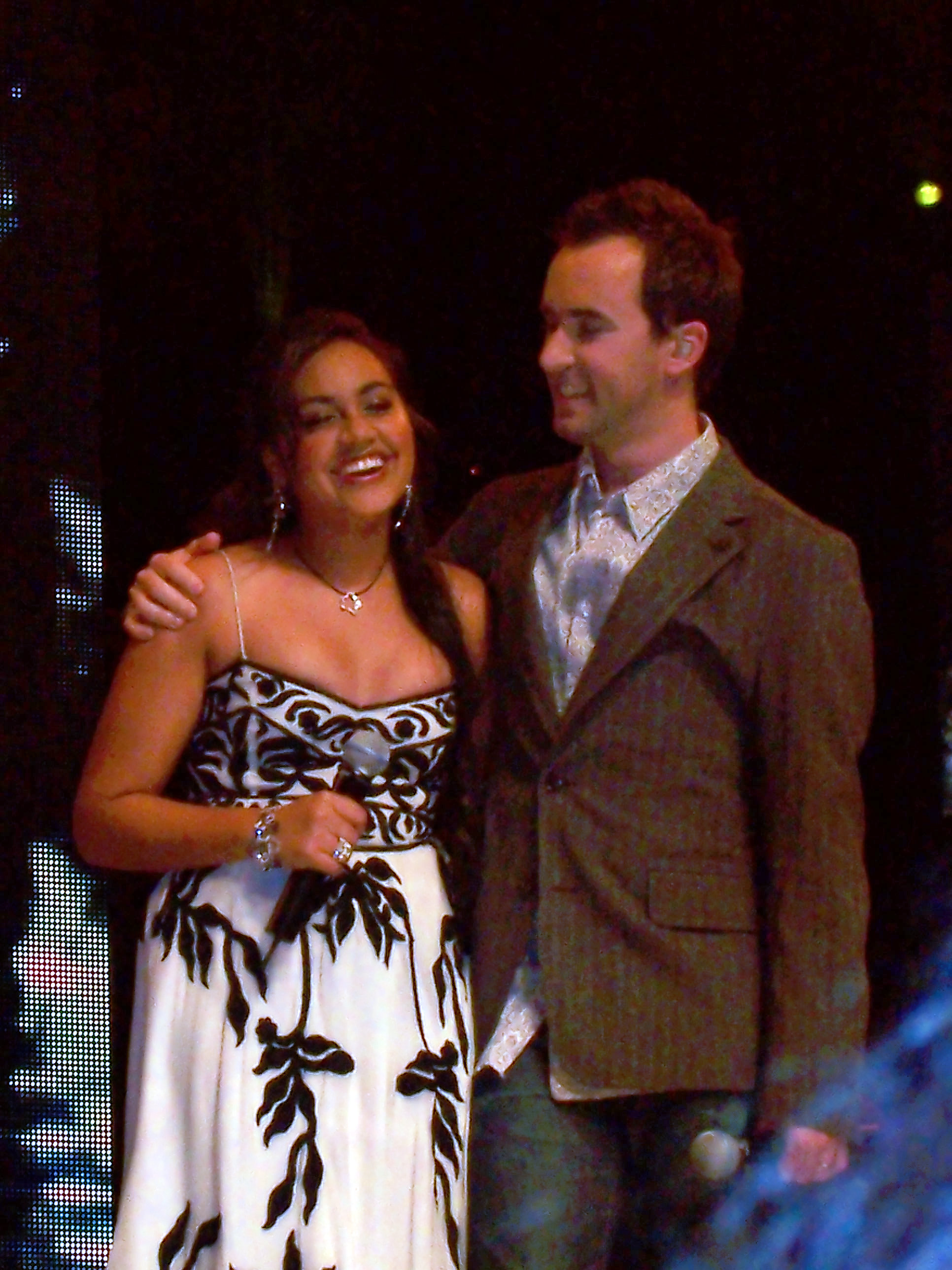
Mauboy and Leith just before the announcement of the winner

The Australian Idol Grand Final was held on 26 November at the Sydney Opera House. The show included performances by Shannon Noll, Anthony Callea, Marcia Hines, Deni Hines, Guy Sebastian, Young Divas and Australian Idol 2006 finalists. Damien Leith was voted the winner, with Jessica Mauboy the runner-up. Leith's first single "Night of My Life" was released soon thereafter.

== Elimination chart ==
Females	Males	Top 24	Top 12	Wild Card	Winner

Did Not Perform	Safe	Safe First	Safe Last	Eliminated

Stage:		Semi-Finals				Wild Card	Finals										
Week:		28/8	29/8	30/8	31/8	4/9	11/9	18/9	25/9	2/10	9/10	16/10	23/10	30/10	6/11	13/11	26/11
Place	Contestant	Result															
1	Damien Leith	Top 12												Bottom 3			Winner
2	Jessica Mauboy		Top 12							Bottom 3							Runner-up
3	Dean Geyer	Top 12							Bottom 2				Bottom 2	Bottom 2		Elim	
4	Chris Murphy	Wild Card				Top 12					Bottom 2				Elim		
5	Ricky Muscat			Wild Card		Top 12		Bottom 2			Bottom 3	Bottom 3	Bottom 3	Elim			
6	Lisa Mitchell				Top 12					Bottom 2		Bottom 2	Elim				
7	Bobby Flynn			Top 12								Elim					
8	Lavina Williams				Top 12		Bottom 2		Bottom 3		Elim						
9	Guy Mutton			Wild Card		Top 12		Bottom 3		Elim							
10	Klancie Keough	Wild Card				Top 12			Elim								
11	Reigan Derry		Top 12				Bottom 3	Elim									
12	Joseph Gatehau			Top 12			Elim										
Wild Card	Brendon Boney	Wild Card				Elim											
Wild Card	Chris Graffiti			Wild Card		Elim											
Wild Card	Amanda Streete		Wild Card			Elim											
Wild Card	Nathaniel Willemse	Wild Card				Elim											
Semi-Final 4	Lydia Denker				Elim												
Semi-Final 4	Jess Griffin				Elim												
Semi-Final 4	Raechel Lee				Elim												
Semi-Final 4	Rebecca Pearce				Elim												
Semi-Final 3	James Steele			Elim													
Semi-Final 2	Atlanta Coogan		Elim														
Semi-Final 2	Lyndelle Palmer-Clarke		Elim														
Semi-Final 1	Paul Vercoe	Elim															

== Idol Backstage ==
=== Origin and production ===
In 2006, Fremantle Australia's digital media division launched Idol Backstage, a companion show to Australian Idol distributed by Telstra and promoted in clips on the main show. It followed the pranks, gags and interviews of host Josh Zepps as he roamed behind the scenes of the Australian Idol set while the show went to air. Idol Backstage marked a clear break in style from the rest of the Idol franchise, appealing to a young, tech-savvy audience. The clips were edited overnight each Sunday and Monday into roughly one commercial half-hour per week (22–24 minutes) over four episodes. There were 54 episodes in total, with additional content available on mobile phones and on BigPond's Idol Backstage Online website.

=== Reaction ===
Idol Backstage was a popular success, with viewer numbers climbing strongly week-on-week and total Idol web video downloads reaching a record 2.5 million throughout the season. Traffic to the Idol website was up 40% on the previous year with more than 26 million page impressions, and Australian Idol became the most popular television program website in the country.

Preceded by Season 3 (2005)	Australian Idol; Season 4 (2006)	Succeeded by Season 5 (2007)
