= Welcome to the Afternoon =

EP by Lisa Mitchell
- Released: 31 May 2008
- Studio: Broken Door Studio, Melbourne
- Genre: Folk
- Length: 15:00
- Label: Scorpio Music; Warner Music
- Producer: Dann Hume

Lisa Mitchell chronology
Said One to the Other (2007)	Welcome to the Afternoon (2008)	Wonder (2009)

Singles from Welcome to the Afternoon
- 1. "See You When You Get Here" Released: 2008; 2. "Neopolitan Dreams" Released: 2008

Welcome to the Afternoon is the second EP release by Lisa Mitchell. The EP was launched in Melbourne on 21 May 2008 but not released officially until the 31st.

Tracks 2–4 were produced, recorded and mixed by Dann Hume at Broken Door Studio, Melbourne. The first track was produced, recorded and mixed by Anthony Whiting at Idle Luxury Studio, London.

Album artwork is credited to Erin Paisley-Strueber with photography from Angelo Kehagias.

== Track listing ==
1. "See You When You Get Here" – 4:14
2. "Neopolitan Dreams" – 3:30
3. "Far Far Far Away" – 3:34
4. "A Little Ramblin' Blues for Any Hour" – 3:42

All songs written by Mitchell excluding track 4 which was written by Mitchell and Dann Hume. Vocals and guitar are all by Mitchell, with piano, harmonica and percussion by Dann Hume.

== Charts ==
Chart performance for Welcome to the Afternoon
Chart (2008)	Peak position
Australia (ARIA)	93
Australian Independent Singles Chart	2
