= When They Play That Song =

EP by Lisa Mitchell
- Released: 15 September 2017
- Genre: Folk, pop
- Label: Parlophone, Warner Music

Lisa Mitchell chronology
Warriors (2016)	When They Play That Song (2017)

Singles from When They Play That Song
- 1. "California" Released: 14 July 2016

When They Play That Song is the fourth EP by Lisa Mitchell. The EP was announced in August 2017 with Mitchell posting on her Facebook page "So, you know how I recorded a version of The O.C. theme song "California" by Phantom Planet? Well, I decided to record a few more songs from around that time" adding it's "an EP of moments from 90s films".

== Reception ==
Lauren from Sounds of Oz said: "Lisa approaches all the songs with a delicate touch. She needs little more than an acoustic guitar and her sweet, whispery voice to bring them to life. I appreciate the minimalist approach which lets us hear the nuances in lyrics that might have been drowned out by production in the originals."

== Track listing ==
1. "Cruel to Be Kind" (Nick Lowe, Ian Gomm) – 3:34
2. "California" (Alex Greenwald, Jason Schwartzman, Joseph Meyer, B.G. De Sylva) – 2:47
3. "Stop" (Spice Girls, Paul Wilson, Andy Watkins) – 2:45
4. "Every You Every Me" (Charles Drummond, Steve Hewitt, Brian Molko, Stefan Olsdal) – 3:30
5. "Lovefool" (Peter Svensson, Nina Persson) – 3:15
