= Wonder (Lisa Mitchell album) =

Studio album by Lisa Mitchell
- Released: 31 July 2009
- Recorded: 2008
- Genres: Indie pop, folk
- Length: 56:02
- Label: Scorpio
- Producer: Dann Hume

Lisa Mitchell chronology
Welcome to the Afternoon (2008)	Wonder (2009)	Spiritus (2012)

Singles from Wonder
- 1. "Coin Laundry" Released: 24 April 2009; 2. "Clean White Love" Released: 6 November 2009; 3. "Oh! Hark!" Released: 2 April 2010

Professional ratings
Review scores
Source	Rating
The Age	3/5 stars
The Border Mail	4/5 stars
The Music Magazine	(favorable)
OzMusicScene	(favorable)
The Times	4/5 stars
Triple J	(favorable)

Wonder is the first studio album by Australian singer Lisa Mitchell. It was released on 31 July 2009 in Australia by Scorpio Music. The album has yielded three singles; "Coin Laundry", "Clean White Love" and "Oh! Hark!".

Writing for the album began in 2007 where she collaborated with artists such as Ben Lee, Kevin Mitchell, Clare Bowditch and Katy Steele. At the end of 2007, she moved to London to continue writing for the album and collaborating with Ant Whiting, Ed Harcourt, Dann Hume and Sacha Skarbek. She returned to Australia in 2008 and re-recorded most of the album with Evermore member Dann Hume, stating their versions had more energy and were a lot lighter – "they were positive and uplifting." Mitchell explains, "With Anthony, I was homesick by the time I got around to doing the vocals."

Wonder had commercial success in Australia. It debuted at number six on the Australian ARIA Albums Chart on 10 August 2009, becoming Mitchell's first top ten album. The album spent three weeks in the top ten and twenty-four weeks in the top fifty, re-entering three times. The Australian Recording Industry Association awarded the album a platinum certification for shipping 70,000 copies and became the fifty-sixth highest selling album in Australia for 2009. Wonder was nominated for one ARIA Award at the twenty-third ARIA Awards in 2009 for "Breakthrough Artist – Album", but lost the award to Ladyhawke by Ladyhawke.

At the J Awards of 2009, the album was nominated for Australian Album of the Year.

== Track listing ==
Original release
No.	Title	Writer(s)	Producer(s)	Length
1.	"Oh What a Beautiful Morning"	Oscar Hammerstein II, Richard Rodgers	Dann Hume	0:46
2.	"Neopolitan Dreams"	Lisa Mitchell	Hume	3:14
3.	"So Jealous"	Mitchell, Anthony Whiting	Whiting	3:48
4.	"Coin Laundry"	Mitchell	Hume	3:12
5.	"Clean White Love"	Crispin Hunt, Mitchell	Hunt	3:48
6.	"Pirouette"	Mitchell	Hume	5:06
7.	"Love Letter"	Mitchell	Hume	4:04
8.	"Oh! Hark!"	Mitchell	Hume	4:32
9.	"Red Wine Lips"	Mitchell	Hume	3:25
10.	"Sidekick"	Mitchell	Hume	4:07
11.	"Stevie"	Ed Harcourt, Mitchell	Whiting	4:54
12.	"Animals"	Mitchell, Whiting	Whiting	3:42
13.	"Valium"	Mitchell	Hume	4:00

Australian only exclusive tracks
No.	Title	Writer(s)	Producer(s)	Length
14.	"Heroine"	Mitchell, Whiting	Whiting	3:45
15.	"Time Means Nothing at All"	Mitchell	Hume	3:47

Australian only exclusive disc
No.	Title	Writer(s)	Length
1.	"Remind Me" (demo)	Mitchell, Hume	3:50
2.	"Oh Nostalgia" (demo)	Mitchell	3:03
3.	"Sun Sun Sun" (demo)	Mitchell	3:32
4.	"Oh! Hark!" (acoustic demo)	Mitchell	3:11

Special edition bonus disc
No.	Title	Writer(s)	Length
1.	"Sweetest Ignorance"	Mitchell, Whiting	3:50
2.	"Running Through the Forest"	Mitchell	3:40
3.	"Pirouette" (live from the Woodford Folk Festival)	Mitchell	4:57
4.	"Oh! Hark!" (live & acoustic)	Mitchell	3:06
5.	"Romeo and Juliet"	Mark Knopfler	4:49
6.	"Sweet Serene Afternoon"	Mitchell, Whiting	2:59

== Charts ==
=== Weekly charts ===
Chart (2009)	Peak position
Australian Albums Chart	6

=== Year-end charts ===
Chart (2009)	Position
Australian Albums Chart	56

== Release history ==
Region	Date	Label	Format	Catalog
Australia	31 July 2009	Scorpio Music	double CD	5186509532
