= Spiritus (EP) =

EP by Lisa Mitchell
- Released: 4 May 2012
- Genre: Folk, Pop music
- Label: Scorpio Music; Warner Music
- Producer: Dann Hume

Lisa Mitchell chronology
Wonder (2009)	Spiritus (2012)	Bless This Mess (2012)

Singles from Spiritus
- 1. "Spiritus" Released: March 2012

Spiritus is the third EP release by Lisa Mitchell. The EP was released on 4 May 2012 and peaked at number 66 on the Australian ARIA Chart.

== Review ==
Tanya Ali from The AU Review gave the EP 9.6 out of 10, praising the sophistication, growth and song writing maturation saying; "Throughout the whole EP, lyrics are a very strong point and it is clear that Mitchell is a very capable songwriter, tackling deep emotions and issues with tact and poeticism.". Simon Ubaldi from Beat Magazine said it was an interesting step forward by Mitchell, complemented the vocals but said it "lacks real spirit."

== Track listing ==
1. "Spiritus"
2. "Diamond in the Rough"
3. "I am a Traveller"
4. "Erik"
5. "Parade Song"

== Charts ==
Chart (2012)	Peak position
ARIA Top 100 Singles	66
