= Lisa Mitchell =

Australian musician, singer and songwriter (born 1990)

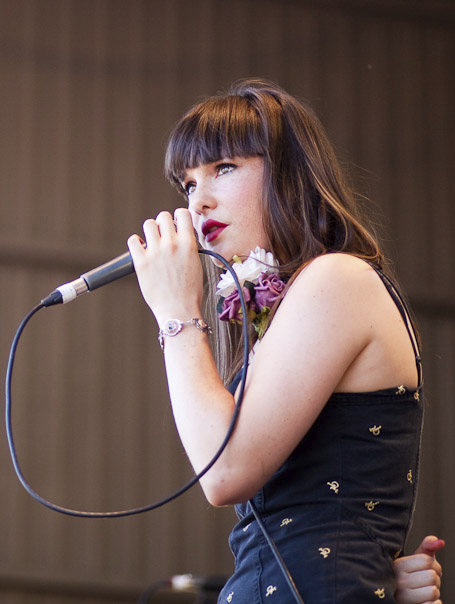
- Lisa Mitchell in 2009.

Background information
- Born: Lisa Helen Mitchell; 22 March 1990 (age 36); Canterbury, England
- Origin: Albury, New South Wales, Australia
- Genres: Indie pop, acoustic, folk
- Occupations: Musician, singer, songwriter
- Instruments: Guitar, vocals, piano
- Years active: 2006–present
- Labels: Warner, PIAS Recordings
- Partner: Danny Ross

Lisa Helen Mitchell (born 22 March 1990) is an Australian musician, singer and songwriter who grew up in Albury, New South Wales. Mitchell currently lives in Melbourne and is working on her fourth studio album. Mitchell finished sixth in the 2006 season of Australian Idol. Her debut extended play, Said One to the Other (4 August 2007), topped iTunes in Australia and she signed with London-based publisher, Little Victories, a subsidiary of Sony/ATV. By 2008 Mitchell had relocated to the UK where she recorded her debut studio album, Wonder (31 July 2009), which peaked at No. 6 on the ARIA Albums Chart. She won the 2009 Australian Music Prize of $30,000 for the album. Mitchell returned to Australia to live in Melbourne. Her second album, Bless This Mess (12 October 2012) reached No. 7. In March 2015, Mitchell's last single "Wah Ha" was remixed by electronic trio Seekae. Her third album Warriors was released on 16 October 2016 and debuted Top 10 on the ARIA Albums Chart.

== Early years ==
Lisa Helen Mitchell was born on 22 March 1990 in Canterbury, England. Her parents, Angus and Ruth, are both doctors, and she has a younger sister, Nicola. The Mitchell family had moved to Australia when she was three and she grew up near Albury on a 20-hectare (49-acre) farm. She attended The Scots School Albury. She began guitar lessons at 12, and leaned towards the folk and rock genres. Mitchell later recalled her pivotal moment was seeing Missy Higgins perform "Scar" on the program Video Hits: "My sister called me out to watch it ... Missy was a really normal, cool chick making music as her own thing. I found that really inspiring".

She performed in local cafes and events as well as with a cover band, Chrome, with "three of my best friends". At that time "We thought that The Donnas and Karen O from the Yeah Yeah Yeahs were the ultimate women of the world". Her varied inspirations include Bob Dylan, Cat Stevens and Neil Young, which her father favoured as she was growing up, as well as Patti Smith, Regina Spektor, Clare Bowditch, Joanna Newsom, and later, Lou Reed and Velvet Underground. Mitchell also formed a duo with another Albury-based friend, Katherine Green, which was "More along the lines of what I do on my own now, only a lot folkier. We sang [...] colonial folk tunes actually. Quite traditional and harmony based. We had brilliant fun playing in the chalkboard tents at the folk festivals in Australia". Mitchell was later based in Sydney, London and then Melbourne.

== Music career ==
=== 2006–2008: Australian Idol and first releases ===
From August to October 2006, Lisa Mitchell rose to national prominence as a contestant on Australian Idol Season 4, performing cover versions and two of her own compositions, which were "See It in Your Eyes" and "Too Far Gone". Mitchell had auditioned in Albury in April, aged 16, and moved through the selection process to the final six before being eliminated in mid-October. In June 2009 Mitchell reflected on her time on Australian Idol: "I was uncomfortable with elements of the show and unhappy about the compromises sometimes. I didn't know what I wanted with music but I did know that I loved it. I think that was what the experience cemented. It's taken me a long time to find my own way. But I never went back to school".

Four years after Lisa Mitchell was a finalist on TV talent series, Australian Idol, The Sydney Morning Herald summed up the influence of the competition on Mitchell's career: "Lisa Mitchell's journey from Australian Idol misfit to folk siren is the story of a road less travelled. In fact, it wouldn't be overstating things to say it counts among the music industry's more unlikely career paths. For a naive teen with a sweet voice, a guitar and vague acoustic-folk aspirations, such an anointment could have been the kiss of death."

Starting in March 2007 Mitchell performed live from her home on her MySpace page, with her first online gig reaching 10,000 viewers. On 13 April that year, she performed at a National Youth Week event in Parkes, supporting local country-folk, family band The Lees, which includes fellow Australian Idol Top 24 contestant, Raechel Lee. Mitchell's set of eight original tracks was followed by later joining The Lees on stage: together they performed her originals, "Alice" and "See It in Your Eyes", and a cover of Ben Harper's "Diamonds on the Inside".

During that year she supported tours by Old Man River, The Hampdens, Bob Evans, Ben Lee and Evermore. On 4 August she released her first extended play, Said One to the Other, via iTunes and physically one week later. Its four tracks were produced by Evermore's Dann Hume and debuted on the ARIA Singles Chart at No. 27. It was released independently through Scorpio, and Warner Music. It peaked at No. 1 on the iTunes 'Top Albums' chart. Tange of TheDwarf.com.au website felt it was "sweet, and cute, and delicate, and nice – but not truly beautiful, powerful or developed". "Incomplete Lullaby", which was co-written by Mitchell and Hume, was used on the Australian version of celebrity dance competition TV series, So You Think You Can Dance.

On 5 January 2008 Mitchell appeared on an episode of SBS-TV's celebrity music quiz show, RocKwiz, where she performed "Incomplete Lullaby", solo, and then duetted with Quan Yeomans on "Raspberry Beret". She followed in the next month by her second headlining tour with support acts Ashleigh Mannix and Leroy Lee. Mitchell then began writing material for her debut album with Ben Lee, Evans and Bowditch – but the it was not used. Her second EP, Welcome to the Afternoon, was released on 31 May that year; followed by two singles, "Neopolitan Dreams" (as a digital single) and "See You When You Get Here". "Neopolitan Dreams" received considerable airplay on Australian radio stations Triple J, FBi 94.5 and Nova 96.9. It was listed at No. 91 on the Triple J Hottest 100, 2008.

In April 2008 Mitchell moved to London to continue writing for her debut album, collaborating with Ant Whiting, Ed Harcourt and Sacha Skarbek. The "Neopolitan Dreams" official video made its debut on 5 September and the single was re-released the next day on iTunes. It was used as the theme tune for online series The MySpace Road Tour. It is featured on the Packed to the Rafters soundtrack; in a 3 Mobile television advert in July; in a UK Surf Detergent advert in September; in a Deutsche Telekom ad; and in Spain in the El Corte Inglés Christmas ad. "Far Far Far Away" from Welcome to the Afternoon was used to promote the Olympic cliffhanger episode of Home and Away.

Paul Lester of The Guardian declared Mitchell to be New Band of the Day as "there's more to [her] than an ability to hold a note, although she does that very well indeed, even if her voice is perhaps too idiosyncratic for one of those reality programmes, a little too quavery, kooky and girly". After working in London for six months, Mitchell returned to Australia. During October and November she undertook an Australian national tour starting in Canberra and finishing in Perth.

=== 2009–2011: Wonder ===
After the February 2009 Black Saturday bushfires, a number of benefit concerts were organised; Lisa Mitchell performed an unaccompanied set, supporting Tex Perkins, at the Ding Dong Lounge in Melbourne. TheDwarf.com.au reviewer, Matt Stewart, noted that "Her voice shines".

In April that year she opened for Jason Mraz in Melbourne. In the following month she toured again, with Andy Bull and Vanessa Jade supporting. In June Mitchell performed at the Glastonbury Festival 2009, which also included fellow Australian artists, The Temper Trap. In July 2009 Mitchell released her debut album, Wonder, which peaked at No. 6 on the ARIA Albums Chart. Promotion for the album included various tours in Australia and a European tour.

Ben Vernel of theDwarf.com.au felt the album was "not a bad debut. It's a little bit obnoxious and a little bit cutesy in parts ... Aside from that, which is purely a matter of taste, the songs are very very well written". While The Age's Andrew Murfett noted it was "a sparkling debut album" and Mitchell told him "I'm happy where I am at the moment ... It's ticking along quite nicely. I like working hard. And it's good to see the results".

It was accredited a platinum record for shipment of 70,000 copies by ARIA at the end of 2010. Despite working in London with "the creme de la creme of what you would want to record with. I mean, we had Ed Harcourt playing keys on everything!", most of the album tracks were produced by Hume at The Stables Recording Studio in country Victoria. The album provided three singles: "Coin Laundry" (August 2009), which peaked at No. 28 on the ARIA Singles Chart, while "Clean White Love" (November) did not chart and "Oh! Hark!" (April 2010) reached the Top 100.

In August "Coin Laundry" was featured in a Bell Canada ad for the Palm Pre. "Neopolitan Dreams" was also used in the game LittleBigPlanet (2009) and is the song of the customer service of Chilean telco VTR. In October Mitchell supported Newton Faulkner (aka Crispin Hunt) on his Rebuilt by Humans Tour across the UK and Republic of Ireland which included shows in Dublin, Belfast, Glasgow, and Newcastle. At the ARIA Music Awards of 2009 Mitchell was nominated in three categories: Best Female Artist, Breakthrough Artist – Album for Wonder, and Breakthrough Artist – Single for "Coin Laundry". "Coin Laundry" was placed at No. 7 in the Triple J Hottest 100, 2009.

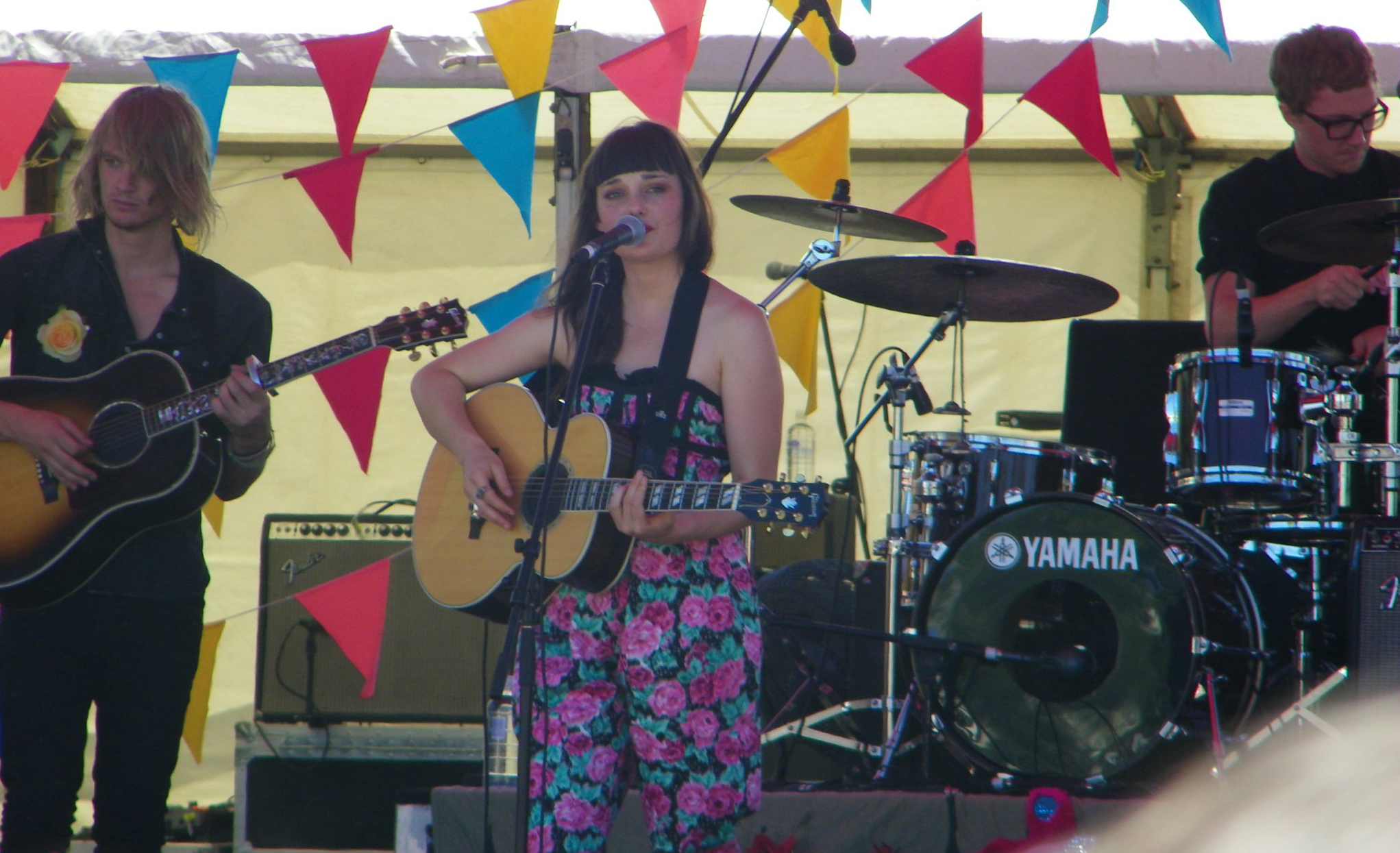
Mitchell at Big Day Out, Claremont, January 2010. On guitar is Stuart Barlow

Mitchell performed at Australia's Big Day Out festival series in January 2010. Her pre-gig ritual was to "Be silly and put way too much sparkles on my eyelids and make up silly songs with Stuart [Barlow] (guitarist) and revise my 'Coin Laundry' rant. (I have to warn people not to throw coins etc.)" She enjoyed socialising with other artists including Oh Mercy, Tame Impala, Kisschasey and Eskimo Joe.

Her song "Pirouette" was featured in an advertisement for the 2010 season of Bondi Rescue. In March that year "Neopolitan Dreams" was covered by Lena Meyer-Landrut, on the quarter-final episode of TV show, Unser Star für Oslo, when she was competing for the opportunity to represent Germany at the Eurovision Song Contest. The exposure generated by Meyer-Landrut's performance saw Mitchell's single reach No. 33 on the German Singles Chart. In April to May 2010 Mitchell went on her Oh! Hark! National Theatre Tour, where she was supported by Sydney-based country blues duo, Georgia Fair, and indie rock group, Boy & Bear. Her tour included over 18,000 fans in attendance.

On 31 May that year "Neopolitan Dreams" was featured on Showtime's The United States of Tara, Season 2 Episode 11 "To Have and to Hold". "Clean White Love" was featured in the 2011 Australian feature film, Red Dog. In May 2011 Mitchell was featured on vocals for Georgia Fair's single, "Marrianne", alongside their guitarist-singer, Jordan Wilson, and Boy & Bear's Dave Hoskings. In October that year Mitchell headed to Hume's rural studio to start recording tracks, "It's beautiful; it's nice to be out in the country every day. Nature affects me in really good ways so I love being out in the country".

=== 2012–2013: "Spiritus" and Bless This Mess ===
Lisa Mitchell released a single, "Spiritus", on 27 March 2012 and undertook a national tour of church venues, Heavenly Sounds, in June with Georgia Fair supporting her. A music video for "Spiritus" featured Georgia Fair's Wilson as her "love interest" and the single peaked at number 91. In May, Mitchell released an EP titled Spiritus, which featured "Spiritus" and four other new tracks. The EP charted at No. 17 on the ARIA Australian Artists Singles Chart and No. 66 on the ARIA Singles Chart.

Mitchell's second album, Bless This Mess, was released on 12 October 2012, which reached No. 7 on the ARIA Albums Chart. It was recorded at The Stables Recording Studio and produced and mixed by Hume. Following its appearance, she toured nationally, supported by Alpine, and Danco (alias for Hume). Rob McNicol of Scene Magazine noted that Mitchell "exposed her philosophical and spiritual side when she began explaining the meaning of the album. She discussed a bunch of real world issues – division of society, the negative impact of money, and the lack of wisdom being passed through the generations – all the while keeping an optimistic outlook on life". While Victoria Birch of FasterLouder found "There's tension between the security of Mitchell's off-kilter folk beginnings and a desire to buck against the pigeonhole's gravitational pull. She's not yet willing to jettison the past but she is very keen to push forward".

The title track was issued ahead of the album as a single in September. The album was also available for streaming online in full during early October.

In early February the following year Mitchell performed at the Melbourne Zoo, supported by Georgia Fair, with proceeds to "help fight wildlife extinction". Later that month and in March she supported Neil Finn and Paul Kelly on their combined Going Your Way Tour of Australia. In May she was interviewed by Marc Fennell for ABC News 24 series, One Plus One, she described her songwriting "I like to demo ... I do really dodgy Garage Band demos on my Mac ... it starts from there ... at that point you can be a control freak and do it however you want".

=== 2014–2017: "Wah Ha" and Warriors ===
On 28 September 2014, Lisa Mitchell released a new song "Wah Ha" as a limited free download, premiering the single on Richard Kingsmill's show on triple j. Mitchell followed the release with a video produced with friend and collaborator Kirrilee Bailey, and sold-out shows in London. The single received airplay in UK from Jo Whiley of BBC Radio 2 and Lauren Laverne as well as plays on US public radio station KCRW with Morning Becomes Eclectic. Mitchell also performed for the show at the end of 2014. On 26 February 2015, a remix of "Wah Ha" by Sydney electronic trio Seekae was premiered by online music magazine Hypetrak.com.

On 2 August 2016, the first single from Mitchell's third studio album, Warriors, was released, titled "The Boys". The music video, set in Mitchell's childhood hometown of Albury, was inspired by her observations of how "guys spend time together, how they show affection – it's always playing games or joking around or drinking, I notice a real buoyancy, or light-heartedness which I think is quite different to girls." Warriors was released on 16 October 2016 and officially in the UK in April 2017. In September 2017 Mitchell released her 4th EP, featuring '90s covers, titled When They Play That Song.

On 31 July 2020, Mitchell released a cover of Gillian Welch's "Everything is Free".

=== 2021–present: A Place to Fall Apart ===
On 29 September 2021, Lisa Mitchell released a new song "Zombie". In an Instagram post, Lisa confirmed the song was the first single from her next album.

On 28 January 2022, Mitchell announced the title of her fourth studio album as A Place to Fall Apart.

== Discography ==
- Wonder (2009)
- Bless This Mess (2012)
- Warriors (2016)
- A Place to Fall Apart (2022)

== Awards and nominations ==
=== APRA Awards ===
The APRA Awards are presented annually from 1982 by the Australasian Performing Right Association (APRA).

Year	Nominee / work	Award	Result	Ref.
2010	Lisa Mitchell	Breakthrough Songwriter of the Year	Nominated	
2010	"Coin Laundry"	Song of the Year	Shortlisted	

=== ARIA Awards ===
The ARIA Music Awards are presented annually from 1987 by the Australian Recording Industry Association (ARIA). Lisa Mitchell has five nominations.

Year	Nominee / work	Award	Result
2009	"Coin Laundry"	Breakthrough Artist – Single	Nominated
2009	Wonder	Breakthrough Artist – Album	Nominated
2009	Wonder	Best Female Artist	Nominated
2010	"Oh! Hark!"	Best Female Artist	Nominated
2010	Lisa Mitchell	Most Popular Australian Artist	Nominated

=== Australian Music Prize ===
Year	Type	Award	Result
2009	Australian Music Prize	Australian Music Prize - Wonder	Won

=== J Award ===
The J Awards are an annual series of Australian music awards that were established by the Australian Broadcasting Corporation's youth-focused radio station Triple J. They commenced in 2005.

Year	Nominee / work	Award	Result
2009	Wonder	Australian Album of the Year	Nominated
