= Absolute Pleasure =

Live album by Electric Six
- Released: October 9, 2012
- Genre: Rock
- Label: Metropolis

Electric Six chronology
Heartbeats and Brainwaves (2011)	Absolute Pleasure (2012)	Mustang (2013)

Absolute Pleasure is a live album by Detroit rock band Electric Six. It is composed of recordings from shows at both First Avenue in Minneapolis, Minnesota and the Double Door in Chicago, Illinois.

== Track listing ==
1. "It's Showtime!" (from I Shall Exterminate Everything Around Me That Restricts Me From Being The Master)
2. "Down At McDonnelzzz" (from I Shall Exterminate Everything Around Me That Restricts Me From Being The Master)
3. "Danger! High Voltage" (from Fire)
4. "Future Is In The Future" (from Señor Smoke)
5. "Dirty Ball" (from Flashy)
6. "When I Get To The Green Building" (from I Shall Exterminate Everything Around Me That Restricts Me From Being The Master)
7. "Gay Bar" (from Fire)
8. "Infected Girls" (from Switzerland)
9. "Jam It In The Hole" (from Zodiac)
10. "She's White" (from Fire)
11. "Body Shot" (from KILL)
12. "Dance Epidemic" (from Señor Smoke)
13. "I Buy The Drugs" (from Switzerland)
14. "Hello! I See You!" (from Heartbeats and Brainwaves)
15. "Crazy Horses" (The Osmonds cover)
16. "Dance Commander" (from Fire)
17. "Synthesizer" (from Fire)

== Personnel ==
- Dick Valentine - vocals
- Tait Nucleus? - synthesizer
- The Colonel - guitar
- Johnny Na$hinal - guitar
- Percussion World - drums
- Smorgasbord - bass

== Absolute Treasure ==
Absolute Treasure
- Directed by: John Anderson
- Written by: Tyler Spencer
- Produced by: Mel Caceres, Phil Crossland, Pat Divis, Sharon Iles, Peter Schofield & Niles Stanbery
- Starring: Dick Valentine; Tait Nucleus?; Johnny Na$hinal; Percussion World; Smörgåsbord; Da Vé
- Cinematography: Geoff George
- Edited by: Chad Thompson
- Music by: Electric Six
- Production company: Strikey! Corporation
- Release date: February 2014
- Running time: 93 minutes
- Country: United States
- Language: English
- Budget: $62,760

Absolute Treasure was originally announced as a film alongside Absolute Pleasure with both intended as companion piece recordings of live-shows to celebrate the band's 10th anniversary. The initial announcement stated that the band would be playing a special anniversary gig at the O2 Shepherd's Bush Empire in London on December 15, 2012, consisting of two sets: the first being made up of greatest hits and the second being the album Fire, performed in its entirety. Plans to film the performance fell through, but, otherwise, the gig went ahead as planned. In addition to the two sets, Dick Valentine opened the show with a small solo set and the band performed an encore.

In 2013, the band resurrected the project, raising production funds via a Kickstarter campaign. The show was performed at St. Andrews Hall in Detroit, Michigan on September 7, 2013.

Among other fundraising perks, the band offered five opportunities for people to choose a song of their choice for the band to record a cover version of. The songs selected were "Gary's In the Park" by Gary Wilson, "Maneater" by Hall & Oates, "Pokémon Theme" by Jason Paige, "Rock DJ" by Robbie Williams, "She Drives Me Crazy" by Fine Young Cannibals and "2112: Overture/The Temple of Syrinx" by Rush. The success and popularity of these covers lead to the band's second Kickstarter project, "Mimicry and Memories", a full covers album.

== Track listing ==
The band performed a different setlist to the one featured on their "Absolute Pleasure" album. Among others, it featured a song from their album "Mustang" that was released between "Absolute Pleasure" and "Absolute Treasure".

1. "Down At McDonnelzzz" (from I Shall Exterminate Everything Around Me That Restricts Me From Being The Master)
2. "Devil Nights" (from Señor Smoke)
3. "Transatlantic Flight" (from Flashy)
4. "Future Is In The Future" (from Señor Smoke)
5. "Danger! High Voltage" (from Fire)
6. "Show Me What Your Lights Mean" (from Mustang)
7. "Steal Your Bones" (from KILL)
8. "Hello! I See You" (from Heartbeats and Brainwaves)
9. "Gay Bar" (from Fire)
10. "Jam It In The Hole" (from Zodiac)
11. "Clusterfuck!" (from Zodiac)
12. "Body Shot" (from KILL)
13. "Synthesizer" (from Fire)
14. "Dance Epidemic" (from Señor Smoke)
15. "I Buy The Drugs" (from Switzerland)
16. "Dance Commander" (from Fire)

-Encore-

1. "Formula 409" (from Flashy)
2. "Rip It!" (from I Shall Exterminate Everything Around Me That Restricts Me From Being The Master)
3. "We Were Witchy Witchy White Women" (from Flashy)

== Personnel ==
- Dick Valentine - vocals
- Tait Nucleus? - synthesizer
- Johnny Na$hinal - guitar, background vocals
- Percussion World - drums
- Smörgåsbord - bass
- Da Ve - guitar, background vocals
