= Flashy =

2008 studio album by Electric Six

Studio album by Electric Six
- Released: October 21, 2008
- Genre: Rock
- Length: 44:53
- Label: Metropolis
- Producer: Zach Shipps

Electric Six chronology
I Shall Exterminate Everything Around Me That Restricts Me from Being the Master (2007)	Flashy (2008)	Kill (2009) - Sexy Trash (2008)

Professional ratings
Aggregate scores
Source	Rating
Metacritic	60/100
Review scores
Source	Rating
AllMusic	3.5/5 stars
The A.V. Club	C−
Blender	3/5 stars
PopMatters	7/10
Spin	3.5/5 stars
Under the Radar	6/10

Flashy is the fifth album by Detroit rock band Electric Six, released on October 21, 2008, through Metropolis Records.

The album was accompanied by a music video for track "Formula 409", which appeared online on July 30, 2008. A claymation video for the track 'Making Progress' was also released.

== Artwork ==
The album artwork is taken from a painting called Hellcat by Detroit-based artist Ron Zakrin, who also created the artwork used for the band's previous album I Shall Exterminate Everything Around Me That Restricts Me from Being the Master.

== Track listing ==
All lyrics written by Tyler Spencer; all music composed by Spencer except where noted.

=== CD version ===
1. "Gay Bar Part Two" – 2:42
2. "Formula 409" (Zach Shipps, Spencer, Keith Thompson) – 3:43
3. "We Were Witchy Witchy White Women" – 3:55
4. "Dirty Ball" – 3:40
5. "Lovers Beware" – 3:19
6. "Your Heat Is Rising" – 3:32
7. "Face Cuts" – 3:15
8. "Heavy Woman" – 3:14
9. "Flashy Man" – 2:04
10. "Watching Evil Empires Fall Apart" – 3:58
11. "Graphic Designer" (Mike Alonzo, Shipps, Spencer, Thompson) – 4:36
12. "Transatlantic Flight" – 4:02
13. "Making Progress" – 2:59

=== LP version ===
==== Side One ====
1. "Gay Bar Part Two" – 2:42
2. "Formula 409" – 3:43
3. "Dirty Ball" – 3:40
4. "Lovers Beware" – 3:19
5. "Your Heat Is Rising" – 3:32
6. "Face Cuts" – 3:15
7. "Flashy Man" – 2:04

==== Side two ====
1. "We Were Witchy Witchy White Women" – 3:55
2. "Heavy Woman" – 3:14
3. "Watching Evil Empires Fall Apart" – 3:58
4. "Graphic Designer" – 4:36
5. "Transatlantic Flight" – 4:02
6. "Making Progress" – 2:59

"Gay Bar Part Two" is a response to the band's fame stemming from "Gay Bar". The line "soft steaming shits demanding Gay Bar Part 2" is an indication of resentment over their most popular and often only song they are recognized for. Many people pushed the band to write 'another Gay Bar' and none of their later work was as successful at breaking into the mainstream. The song also features references to the band's other songs "Danger! High Voltage", "There's Something Very Wrong with Us, So Let's Go Out Tonight", "Be My Dark Angel" and "She's White".

== Personnel ==
- Dick Valentine – vocals
- Tait Nucleus? – synthesizer, other [bleep blop]
- The Colonel – guitar, autoharp
- Johnny Na$hinal – guitar, synthesizer
- Percussion World – drums, timbales
- Smörgåsbord – bass
- Christian Doble – saxophone, trumpet
- Kevin Bayson – trumpet (track 1)

== Charts ==
Chart performance for Trashy
Chart (2008)	Peak position
US Billboard Top Heatseekers	39

== Sexy Trash ==
Sexy Trash

Compilation album by Electric Six
- Released: October 17, 2008 (tour only)
- Recorded: 1996–2007
- Genre: Rock
- Length: 75:16

Electric Six chronology
Flashy (2008)	Sexy Trash (2008)	KILL (2009)

The band promoted Flashy in the US, the UK and Spain on their Hitting the Walls and Working the Middle tour. A 30 track album of demos and previously unreleased material, titled Sexy Trash, was released and made available at those shows.

The 30 tracks contain demos, B-sides and rarities, covering the band's career from 1996 to 2007, and the album also includes brief liner-notes from lead singer Dick Valentine. While initially only available at gigs making up Flashy's tie-in tour in the United States, it has subsequently been sold in the United Kingdom, Ireland and Spain as well as at later gigs by the band and as a reward for pledgers of their Kickstarter project campaigns.

The title of the album comes from a track on the band's fourth album I Shall Exterminate Everything Around Me That Restricts Me From Being The Master.

=== Track listing ===
All tracks recorded as Electric Six, except where otherwise stated.

1. "Immolate Me" (Recorded as The Wildbunch. Previously leaked demo) [1997] – 4:36
2. "I Know Karate" (Recorded as The Wildbunch. Originally released as single B-side for "I Lost Control (Of My Rock & Roll)") [1996] – 2:40
3. "Baby Vs. Baby" (Recorded as The Wildbunch. Previously leaked demo) [1996] – 2:28
4. "My Baby Is a Nuclear Winter" (Recorded as The Wildbunch. Allegedly featured on the long out-of-print cassette version of 'I Lost Control' Single) [1996] – 2:07
5. "One More Time" (Recorded as The Wildbunch. Some lyrics later re-used for "Dance Pattern") [2000] – 2:31
6. "Antisocial Sex Boy Hit Machine" (Recorded as The Wildbunch) [1999] – 3:27
7. "Future Girls" (Recorded as The Dirty Shame. Written for a second Dirty Shame album, which was cancelled. Some lyrics later used in "Kukuxuxmushu"/"Dance Pattern") [2001] – 3:25
8. "I Thought You Was Dead" (Recorded as The Dirty Shame. Originally released on The Dirty Shame debut album Smog Cutter Love Story) [2000] – 3:47
9. "Strike While the Iron is Hot!" (Demo from Señor Smoke sessions. Some lyrics later re-used for "Rubber Rocket"/"Rip It!") [2004] – 2:30
10. "Turn It Up!" (Demo from Señor Smoke sessions) [2004] – 2:41
11. "Telephone Conversation" (Believed to be a re-record of an old Wildbunch demo from the Señor Smoke sessions) [2004] – 2:40
12. "Serious Help" (Demo from Señor Smoke sessions. Some lyrics later re-used in "Rubber Rocket") [2004] – 3:34
13. "Future Police" (Some lyrics later re-used in "Bite Me") [2004] – 2:48
14. "Living On The Sexy Planet" (Demo from Señor Smoke sessions) (Some lyrics later re-used for "Rubber Rocket") [2004] – 3:16
15. "Be My Dark Angel" (A demo version of the Señor Smoke album track) [2004] – 3:30
16. "Devil Nights" (A demo version of the Señor Smoke album track) [2004] – 2:52
17. "Another Song About the Devil" (Demo from Señor Smoke sessions. Some lyrics re-used for "Mr. Woman"/"There's Something Very Wrong with Us, So Let's Go Out Tonight") [2004] – 3:10
18. "Self Destruct" (Demo from Señor Smoke sessions. Some lyrics re-used for "Rubber Rocket") [2004] – 1:26
19. "Bite Me" (An acoustic demo of the Señor Smoke album track) [2004] – 0:57
20. "Stepsister" (Demo from Señor Smoke sessions) [2004] – 0:33
21. "Filthy Blankets" (Demo from Señor Smoke sessions) [2004] – 0:16
22. "I'm On A Diet" (Demo from Señor Smoke sessions) [2004] – 0:50
23. "People Like You (Don't Like People Like Me)" (Demo from Señor Smoke sessions. Some lyrics re-used for "Dance Pattern") [2004] – 2:05
24. "Into the Roppongi" (Alternative techno demo of "There's Something Very Wrong with Us, So Let's Go Out Tonight") [2004] – 2:13
25. "The World's Smallest Human Being" (Demo from Señor Smoke sessions. Some lyrics re-used for "Dance-A-Thon 2005") [2004] – 1:42
26. "I Wish This Song Was Louder" (Alternative demo version of the Switzerland track, some lyrics later reused for "Horrible People" and "You Really Like Me" from Evil Cowards' album Covered in Gas) [2004] – 2:31
27. "I Buy the Drugs" (Demo version of the Switzerland track) [2006] – 3:33
28. "Down at McDonnelzzz" (Original version of I Shall Exterminate Everything Around Me That Restricts Me from Being the Master track, originally intended as an interlude on Switzerland) [2007] – 0:23
29. "I Don't Like You" (Demo version of the I Shall Exterminate Everything Around Me That Restricts Me from Being the Master track) [2007] – 2:52
30. "Cold Future" (Demo from Señor Smoke sessions. Some lyrics re-used in "Night Vision") [2004] – 4:05
