= Tyler Spencer =

American singer (born 1972)

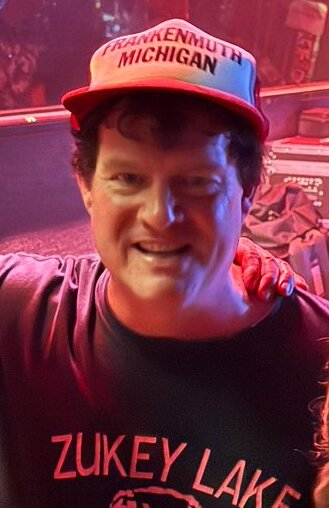
- Valentine in 2025

Background information
- Also known as: Dick Valentine; Taylor Spencer; Jackson Pounder
- Born: Tyler Spencer; January 22, 1972 (age 54); Pittsburgh, Pennsylvania, U.S.
- Origin: Detroit, Michigan, U.S.
- Genres: Alternative rock, dance-rock, dance-punk, folk, freak folk
- Occupations: Singer, songwriter, musician, author
- Instruments: Vocals, guitar, drums, keyboards
- Member of: Electric Six; Evil Cowards; Bang Camaro
- Formerly of: The Dirty Shame

Tyler Spencer (born January 22, 1972), also known as Dick Valentine, is an American singer, songwriter, musician, and author. He is best known as the lead vocalist, main lyricist, and co-founder of the rock band Electric Six.

== Career and Personal life ==
Spencer founded Electric Six in 1996. The band was originally named the Wildbunch, but this was changed because another band had the same name. He is also one of the two members of the synth-pop group Evil Cowards, is one of the vocalists for hard rock band Bang Camaro, and was temporarily a member of the short-lived band The Dirty Shame. He released his first solo album, Destroy the Children, under the Dick Valentine pseudonym on May 14, 2012.

Spencer is a distant cousin of American actor Dean Winters, known for his appearances in Allstate commercials.

== Discography ==
=== The Dirty Shame ===
- Smog Cutter Love Story (2000)

=== Evil Cowards ===
- Covered in Gas (2009)
- Moving Through Security (2012)

=== Solo ===
==== Bite Me ====
Excluding appearances on other artists' songs, Dick Valentine's first solo venture was the soundtrack for Machinima original series Bite Me. Valentine's Evil Cowards bandmate, William Bates, scored the series, while Valentine wrote and performed a variety of original songs. Despite repeated claims that the songs would be made commercially available, Machinima are still yet to release any of them.

On September 11, 2011, Machinima released a music video for Valentine's song "Zombie, Zombie Skeleton" to promote the release of Dead Rising 2.

On June 14, 2012, Dick Valentine collaborated with Mighty Tiny to create The Dick Valentine Band. They performed a live show of the Bite Me soundtrack.

==== Albums ====
Year	Title	Notes
2012	Destroy the Children	Studio album
2013	Halloween Fingers	Studio album
2015	Here Come the Bags!	Studio album
2016	Quiet Time	Studio album consisting of acoustic renditions of songs originally by Electric Six and Evil Cowards
2016	The Dick Valentine Raw Collection	Compilation album composed of demo material produced for Dick Valentine solo albums and Electric Six projects. Was released exclusively as a pledge gift for Electric Six's Kickstarter campaign relating to Roulette Stars of Metro Detroit.
2017	Robocalls	Studio album
2019	Illuminati Bees	Studio album
2019	Bite Me: Songs from a Zombie Show	Studio album released as a Kickstarter campaign and made available only to Kickstarter backers. Contains original songs from the Bite Me soundtrack.
2020	Parrot People	Studio album
2021	Coma Watching	Studio album
2023	This Is Hell!	Studio album
2024	Do You Notice?	Studio album (February 2024)
2024	The Final Musician	Studio album (December 2024)
2026	Anxiety Dogs	Studio album

==== Singles and Appearances ====
Year	Title	Project	Vocals	Writer
2000	"Private Affair"	Bantam Rooster song, released as a B-side on their single, "Big Mess"	Yes	No
2006	"Unstoppable"	TV Rock song featured on their album Sunshine City - credited as Tyler Spencer	Yes	No
2009	"Nuclear Cowboy"	J-Lobster song featured on their album Mindless Pleasures	Yes	No
2009	"I'm a Vampire"	Shitting Glitter single - credited as Rich N. Famous	Yes	No
2012	"The Shrinking Planet"	Single by Massive Horse, later included on their album About Last Night recorded under the new name of Nightmares from the Discothèque	Yes	No
2013	"He's a Freak"	Andy D song featured on album Warcries	Yes	No
2013	"Last Christmas"	Cover version single by Fall On Your Sword	Yes	No
2017	"I Love You, I Steal Your Gas!"	Single by Dick Valentine and Mark Mallman	Yes	Yes
2020	"Summer Wine"	Single by Victoria Liedtke & Dick Valentine - Cover of Nancy Sinatra & Lee Hazlewood song	Yes	No

== Bibliography ==
Release date	Title	Project
3 January 2014	Residential Intruders in the 21st Century: Real Demons, Aliens and Monsters That Visit My Apartment	5-page pamphlet on the "demons, monsters and aliens that constantly visit [Dick] in [his] home".
13 May 2014	Chinatown Reacharound	Pornographic thriller novella. The first book in the Bart Ducane trilogy.
17 July 2014	"Dick Valentine's 2014 Party Planner"	41-page party planner.
27 January 2015	"Dick Valentine's 2015 Party Planner Guide"	57-page party planner - an updated version of the 2014 Party Planner
22 January 2016	Fairfax Facial	Pornographic thriller novella. Sequel to Chinatown Reacharound and the second book in the Bart Ducane trilogy.
30 January 2017	Glendale Glory Hole	Pornographic thriller novella. Sequel to Fairfax Facial and the final book in the Bart Ducane trilogy.
5 March 2022	Durango Dirty Sanchez	Pornographic thriller novella. First in the Horace Ryder series.
27 May 2024	Wanted Man Wet Deck	Pornographic thriller novella. Sequel to Durango Dirty Sanchez and the second book in the Horace Ryder series.
29 July 2026	The Hellmouth Scrolls	Standalone novella. Valentine’s first non-pornographic fiction.

== Filmography ==
Year	Title	Project	Writer	Executive Producer	Actor	Role
2002	"Danger! High Voltage"	Electric Six music video to promote Fire	Yes (songwriter)	No	Yes	Man
2003	"Gay Bar"	Electric Six music video to promote Fire	Yes (songwriter)	No	Yes	Abraham Lincoln
2003	"Dance Commander"	Electric Six music video to promote Fire	Yes (songwriter)	No	Yes	Dick Valentine
2004	"Radio Ga Ga"	Electric Six music video to promote Señor Smoke	No	No	Yes	Freddie Mercury
2006	"Mr. Woman"	Electric Six music video to promote Switzerland	Yes (songwriter)	Yes	Yes	Dick Valentine
2006	"I Buy the Drugs"	Electric Six music video to promote Switzerland	Yes (songwriter)	Yes	Yes	Dick Valentine
2006	"Chocolate Pope"	Electric Six music video to promote Switzerland	Yes (songwriter)	Yes	Yes	Dick Valentine (voice)
2006	"Rubber Rocket"	Electric Six music video to promote Switzerland	Yes (songwriter)	Yes	Yes	Singing Voice
2007	"Infected Girls"	Electric Six music video to promote Switzerland	Yes (songwriter)	Yes	Yes	Dick Valentine
2007	"It's Showtime!"	Electric Six music video to promote I Shall Exterminate Everything Around Me That Restricts Me from Being the Master	Yes (songwriter)	Yes	Yes	Singer's Voice
2007	"Down at McDonnelzzz"	Electric Six music video to promote I Shall Exterminate Everything Around Me That Restricts Me from Being the Master	Yes (songwriter)	Yes	Yes	Centaur
2007	"Randy's Hot Tonight"	Electric Six music video to promote I Shall Exterminate Everything Around Me That Restricts Me from Being the Master	Yes (songwriter)	Yes	Yes	Dick Valentine
2008	"One Gallon Axe"	White Gold music video	Yes (songwriter)	No	Yes	Voice of White Gold
2008	"Tame the White Tiger"	White Gold music video	Yes (songwriter)	No	Yes	Voice of White Gold
2008	"Is It Me Or Do You Love My Hair?"	White Gold music video	Yes (songwriter)	No	Yes	Voice of White Gold
2008	"There's Something Very Wrong With Us, So Let's Go Out Tonight"	Electric Six music video to promote Switzerland	Yes (songwriter)	Yes	Yes	Grim Reaper
2008	"Formula 409"	Electric Six music video to promote Flashy	Yes (songwriter)	Yes	Yes	Dick Valentine
2008	"Making Progress"	Electric Six music video to promote Flashy	Yes (songwriter)	Yes	Yes	Singer
2008	"Pulling the Plug on the Party"	Electric Six music video to promote Switzerland	Yes (songwriter)	Yes	Yes	Singing Voice
2009	"Body Shot"	Electric Six music video to promote KILL	Yes (songwriter)	Yes	Yes	Man
2009	"Battle for Milkquarious"	Promotional short film	Yes (songwriter)	No	Yes (uncredited)	Singing voice of White Gold
2009	"Love Pigs"	Evil Cowards music video to promote Covered in Gas	Yes (songwriter)	Yes	Yes	Evil Coward
2010	Starlight & Superfish	Feature film	No	No	Yes	Bill Laserman
2011	"Zombie, Zombie Skeleton"	Dick Valentine music video	Yes (songwriter)	No	Yes	Singing voice
2011	"You're a Mean One, Mr. Grinch"	Electric Six live performance video produced for The A.V. Club	No	No	Yes	Dick Valentine
2012	"Psychic Visions"	Electric Six music video to promote Heartbeats and Brainwaves	Yes	Yes	Yes	Dick Valentine
2012	"That Voodoo You Do, or 'The Legba Luncheon'"	Short film	Yes	Yes	Yes	Flatbrush Frank
2012	"Bedford Avenue Wine Distributors"	Evil Cowards music video to promote Moving Through Security	Yes (songwriter)	Yes	Yes	Evil Coward
2012	"The Shrinking Planet"	Massive Horse music video	No	No	Yes	The Colonel
2013	"Last Christmas"	Fall On Your Sword music video	No	No	Yes	Singing Voice
2014	Absolute Treasure	Electric Six concert film	Yes	Yes (uncredited)	Yes	Himself - Dick Valentine
2016	Roulette Stars of Metro Detroit	Electric Six mockumentary feature film	Yes	Yes	Yes	Dick Valentine and Voice of Darren Nucleus?
2017	"I Love You, I Steal Your Gas"	Dick Valentine and Mark Mallman music video	Yes (songwriter)	Yes	Yes	Dick Valentine
2017	"I'll Be In Touch"	Electric Six music video to promote Fresh Blood for Tired Vampyres	Yes (songwriter)	Yes	Yes	Dick Valentine
2017	"I Got the Box"	Electric Six music video to promote Fresh Blood for Tired Vampyres	Yes (songwriter)	Yes	Yes	Flatbrush Frank
2018	Chill Out!	Electric Six concert broadcast	Yes	Yes	Yes	Himself - Dick Valentine
2021	"Yah Mo B There"	Electric Six music video promoting Streets of Gold	No	No	Yes	Dick Valentine
2024	"Recreational Cough Syrup Girls!"	Dick Valentine music video	Yes (songwriter)	No	Yes	Dick Valentine
