= Dance Commander =

Single by Electric Six

from the album Fire
- B-side: "I Am Detroit"; Remixes
- Released: October 13, 2003
- Recorded: 2001
- Genre: Hard rock; glam rock
- Length: 2:37 (album version); 2:41 (radio edit)
- Label: XL
- Songwriter: Tyler Spencer
- Producers: Stuart Bradbury; Damien Mendis

Electric Six singles chronology
"Gay Bar" (2003)	"Dance Commander" (2003)	"Vibrator" (2004)

"Dance Commander" is a song by American rock band Electric Six. It was released as the third single from their debut studio album Fire on October 13, 2003, but only in the United Kingdom. The song peaked at number 40 on the UK Singles Chart.

== Music video ==
The song's music video, directed by Reuben Fleischer, features a slightly different mix of the song. It received significant airplay on MTV. The video features scenes of the band's frontman Dick Valentine dancing erratically around a house.

== Track listing ==
=== 12" vinyl ===
- XL — XLT 170

Side A
No.	Title	Length
1.	"Dance Commander" (Benny Benassi Satisfaction Remix)	5:48

Side B
No.	Title	Length
1.	"Dance Commander" (Soulchild Extended Night Mix)	7:05

=== CD1 ===
- XL — XLS 170 CD

Side A
No.	Title	Length
1.	"Dance Commander" (Radio edit)	2:41
2.	"I Am Detroit"	3:17
3.	"Dance Commander" (Soulchild Extended Night Mix)	7:05

=== CD2 ===
- XL — XLS 170 CD2

Side A
No.	Title	Length
1.	"Dance Commander" (Benny Benassi Satisfaction Remix)	5:48
2.	"Dance Commander" (Fatboy Slim Dub Mix)	5:53
3.	"Dance Commander"	2:37

== Charts ==
Chart (2003)	Peak position
UK Singles (Official Charts)	40
UK Indie (Official Charts)	5

== Legacy ==
- The band performed the song on their first live album "Absolute Pleasure".
- The band performed the song in their live concert movie "Absolute Treasure".

== Release history ==
Region	Date	Label	Format	Catalogue no.
United Kingdom	October 13, 2003	XL	12"	XLT 170
United Kingdom	October 13, 2003	XL	CD1	XLS 170 CD
United Kingdom	October 13, 2003	XL	CD2	XLS 170 CD2
