= The Others (song) =

2006 single by Dukes of Windsor

Single by Dukes of Windsor

from the album The Others
- Released: 17 July 2006
- Recorded: 2006
- Length: 3:28
- Label: Dukes of Windsor
- Songwriter(s): Cory Blight, Scott Targett, Jack Weaving
- Producer(s): Jonathan Burnside, (mixing and mastering by Pelle Henriccson and Eskil Lövström)

Dukes of Windsor singles chronology
"The Others" (2006)	"Handsome Man" (2006)

"The Others" is the first single by Australian rock music group Dukes of Windsor, taken from their debut album The Others.

== Track listing ==
iTunes single
No.	Title	Length
1.	"The Others"	3:28

== Remix version ==
"The Others"

Single by TV Rock vs Dukes of Windsor
- Released: 13 March 2007
- Recorded: 2007
- Length: 3:23
- Label: Sony BMG
- Songwriter(s): Jack Weaving, Cory Blight, Scott Targett
- Producer(s): Ivan Gough, Grant Smillie and Colin Snape

Dukes of Windsor singles chronology
"Tear This Party Down" (2006)	"The Others" (2007)	"It's a War" (2008)

TV Rock singles chronology
"Bimbo Nation" (2006)	"The Others" (2007)	"In the Air" (2010)

"The Others" is a Dukes of Windsor song remixed by Australian electronic music duo TV Rock, which was released on 13 March 2007. It was one of the most played tracks on Australian radio in Spring 2007. The single was a top ten hit, the song also reached number one on Australia's ARIA Dance and Club charts.

Dukes of Windsor performed The Others with TV Rock at the MTV Australia Video Music Awards on 29 April 2007, in which they closed the show.

=== Track listing ===
iTunes single
No.	Title	Length
1.	"The Others" (Radio Edit)	3:23
2.	"The Power" (by TV Rock vs Tom Novy vs Snap!)	3:40

CD single
No.	Title	Length
1.	"The Others" (Radio Edit)	3:24
2.	"The Others" (TV Rock Mainroom Mix)	6:44
3.	"The Others" (Kam Denny Mix)	6:55
4.	"Party Rockin'" (Dub Mx)	3:01

== Charts ==
Chart performance for "the Others"
Chart (2007)	Peak position
Australia (ARIA)	10
Australia Club (ARIA)	1
Australia Dance (ARIA)	1

== Certifications ==
Region	Certification	Certified units/sales
Australia (ARIA)	Gold	35,000^{^}
^{^} Shipments figures based on certification alone.

== Release history ==
Region	Date	Label	Format	Catalogue
Australia	17 July 2006	Dukes of Windsor	Digital download	-
Australia	13 March 2007	Sony BMG	Digital download	-
Australia	17 March 2007	Sony BMG	CD	88697079332
