= In the Air (TV Rock song) =

Single by TV Rock featuring Rudy

from the album Until One
- Released: 2 May 2010 (UK)
- Genre: Electro house
- Length: 2:34 (Axwell edit)
- Label: Data
- Songwriter(s): Luke Van Scheppingen; Grant Smillie; Ivan Gough; Rudy Sandapa

TV Rock singles chronology
"The Others" (2007)	"In the Air" (2010)

"In the Air" is a single from Australian dance music duo TV Rock featuring Rudy.

== Track listings ==
- Australian digital EP
1. "In the Air" (Axwell Radio Edit) – 3:22
2. "In the Air" (Axwell Remix) – 7:04
3. "In the Air" (TV Rock & Luke Chable Remix) – 8:56
4. "In the Air" – 7:17
- UK digital EP
1. "In the Air" (Axwell Edit) – 2:34
2. "In the Air" (Blame Edit) – 3:35
3. "In the Air" (Grum Remix) – 5:21
4. "In the Air" (A1 Bassline Mix) – 4:32
5. "In the Air" (Tristan D Remix) – 6:46

== Official versions ==
- "In the Air" (A1 Bassline Mix) – 4:32
- "In the Air" (Axwell Remix) - 7:05
- "In the Air" (Axwell Edit) / (Axwell Radio Edit) – 2:34
- "In the Air" (Blame Edit) – 3:35
- "In the Air" (Grum Remix) – 5:21
- "In the Air" (Tristan D Remix) – 6:46

== Charts ==
=== Weekly charts ===
Weekly chart performance for "In the Air"
Chart (2009–2010)	Peak position
Australia (ARIA)	37
Australia Club Tracks (ARIA)	1
Australia Dance (ARIA)	9
Hungary (Editors' Choice Top 40)	38
UK Singles (OCC)	43
UK Dance (OCC)	6

=== Year-end charts ===
Year-end chart performance for "In the Air"
Chart (2009)	Position
Australia Club Tracks (ARIA)	4
