= Flaunt It (song) =

2006 single by TV Rock

Single by TV Rock featuring Seany B

from the album Sunshine City
- Released: 19 February 2006
- Studio: Bimbo Rock (Melbourne, Victoria)
- Genre: Dirty house
- Length: 3:28
- Label: Sony BMG, Bimbo Rock
- Songwriters: Ivan Gough, Grant Smillie, Sean Berchik
- Producers: Ivan Gough, Grant Smillie

TV Rock singles chronology
"Flaunt It" (2006)	"Bimbo Nation" (2006)

Audio video
- "Flaunt It" on YouTube

"Flaunt It" is a song by Australian dance music duo TV Rock, released the first single from their 2006 debut studio album, Sunshine City. The song became a major success in the duo's home country, topping the ARIA Singles Chart for five weeks, and it also reached number three in New Zealand for three weeks.

== Background and success ==
With no major record companies wanting to sign "Flaunt It", DJs Grant Smilie and Ivan Gough launched their own independent company, "Bimbo Rock". Their initial hope had been to sell a few hundred records in Australia, but the single went on to sell 130,000 physical single sales, 40,000 digital downloads and 65,000 ringtones downloads.

"Flaunt It" debuted at number three on the Australian ARIA Singles Chart on 26 February 2006 before climbing to number two the next week and reaching number one the following week. It spent four consecutive weeks at number before being succeeded by Youth Group's "Forever Young". A week later, it returned to the summit for a fifth week. It stayed in the top 10 for 22 weeks and the top 50 for 39 weeks, ending the year as Australia's second-most successful single and the most successful single by an Australian artist, as well as the most successful dance track. On 14 January 2007, ARIA awarded "Flaunt It" a double-platinum certification for selling over 140,000 copies.

As a result of its Australian success, "Flaunt It" was released in New Zealand. It first appeared at number 17 on the RIANZ Singles Chart on 29 May 2006 and jumped to its peak of number three the next week, staying there for two weeks. It began to descend from the top 10, but it returned to number three on 3 July. Afterwards, it slowly dropped out of the top 10 and exited the chart on 18 September, finishing 2006 as New Zealand's 18th best-selling single. It was confirmed at the 2006 ARIA Music Awards that "Flaunt It" had been signed to be released in Europe, but it did not become a hit.

== Awards ==
"Flaunt It" was nominated for two ARIA Music Awards at the 2006 ceremony.

Year	Nominee / work	Award	Result
2006	"Flaunt It"	Best Dance Release	Won
2006	"Flaunt It"	Highest Selling Single	Won

== Track listing ==
Australian CD single

1. "Flaunt It" (radio edit)
2. "Flaunt It" (TV Rock main room mix)
3. "Flaunt It" (Dirty South mix)
4. "Flaunt It" (TV Rock original mix)

== Charts ==
=== Weekly charts ===
Chart (2005–2006)	Peak position
Australia (ARIA)	1
Australian Club Chart (ARIA)	1
Australian Dance (ARIA)	1
New Zealand (Recorded Music NZ)	3

=== Year-end charts ===
Chart (2006)	Position
Australia (ARIA)	2
Australian Artists (ARIA)	1
Australian Club Chart (ARIA)	10
Australian Dance (ARIA)	1
New Zealand (RIANZ)	18

=== Decade-end charts ===
Chart (2000–2009)	Position
Australia (ARIA)	90
Australian Artists (ARIA)	16

== Certifications ==
Region	Certification	Certified units/sales
Australia (ARIA)	2× Platinum	140,000^{^}
^{^} Shipments figures based on certification alone.
