= Zoë Badwi =

Australian singer-songwriter (born 1986)

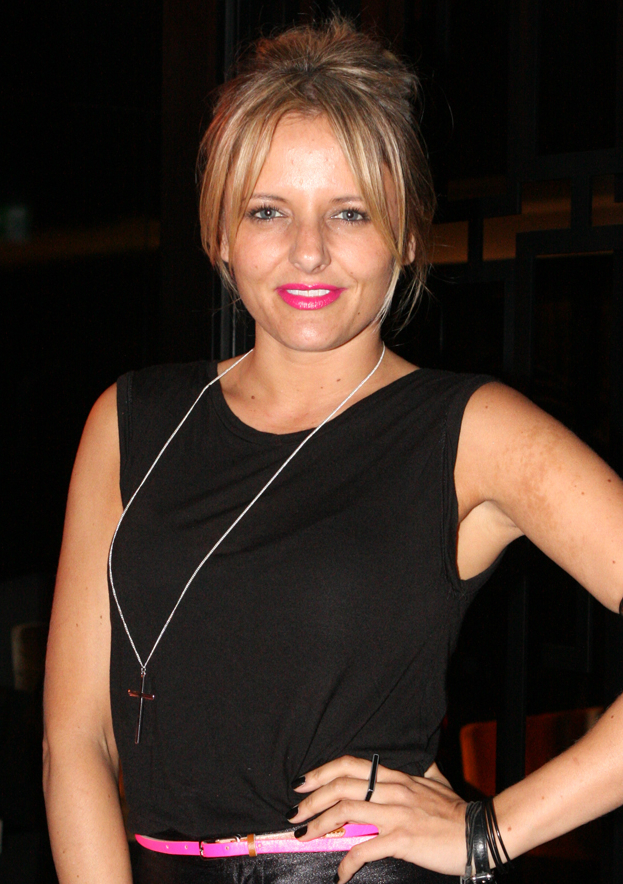
- Badwi in May 2012

Background information
- Born: 4 May 1986 (age 40); Germany
- Origin: Melbourne, Australia
- Genres: Dance-pop; house
- Occupations: Singer; songwriter
- Instrument: Vocals
- Years active: 2001–present
- Labels: Neon; Atlantic
- Website: zoebadwi.com.au

Zoë Badwi (born 4 May 1978) is an Australian singer and songwriter.

== Early life ==
Badwi was born in Germany but later moved to Melbourne, Victoria in Australia, where she was raised. She is half Irish, one-quarter Egyptian, and one-quarter Saudi Arabian. Before her career in music began, Badwi spent time modelling and featured in a series of television commercials including advertisements for Telstra and Mars Bars. She made her acting debut appearing in the Australian drama series Raw FM, which she took part in for eight months. Badwi is a cousin of Little Mix member Jade Thirlwall.

== Career ==
In 2001, Badwi became a member of the Australian girl group Sirens, replacing the original third member who left to pursue a career in modelling. They had minor success with the singles "Like Fire, Like Rain" and the cover version of The Pointer Sisters' "I'm So Excited" featuring Sara-Marie Fedele from the first series of Big Brother Australia. Badwi later left the group to pursue a solo career.

After being discovered by Grant Smillie, a member of the Australian duo TV Rock at a venue in Melbourne, Badwi went on to sign with Neon Records and released her debut solo single "Release Me" in November 2008. The single reached number one on the ARIA Clubs Chart and received two award nominations for "Best Dance Release" at the 2009 ARIA Music Awards and also "Dance Work of the Year" at the 2010 APRA Awards. In July 2010, Badwi released her fourth single, "Freefallin". It reached a peak of number nine on the ARIA Singles Chart and was eventually certified platinum. In September 2010, it was announced that she had signed to US record label, Atlantic Records.

"Accidents Happen" was released on 24 January 2011, as Badwi's fifth overall single. While filming the music video for the song, a resident in the street where the clip was filmed fired a catapult at Badwi, who was unharmed. It is not known whether her singing was a motive for the attack. The video shoot went on afterward with no incident and no one was apprehended over the matter.

Badwi's sixth single, "Carry Me Home", featuring Grant Smilie, was released on 3 June 2011. The song failed to impact the ARIA Singles Chart, but managed to peak at number six on the ARIA Club Chart. Badwi's self-titled debut album was released in Australia on 5 August 2011. Badwi worked on the album with Static Revenger, TV Rock, Stuart Crichton, Rogue Traders, and Amy Pearson. The following single, "Shoot Me Down" was released on 21 September 2012. The single has only managed to chart on Australia's official Radio Airplay chart at #58

In 2011, saw the ABC Television's new music show Stay Tuned with Joel Phillips talks to across dance pop singing sensation Zoe Badwi will air on ABC3.

In June 2016, Badwi was the featured artist on three new-released singles. The Potbelleez with a cover of "Horny", Paki and Jaro with "I Must Have Died" and Tenzin with "Love Me Baby".

In 2017, Badwi was the support act for the dates of Little Mix's Glory Days Tour in Australia and New Zealand.

In 2020, Bawdi performed with Greg Gould on the song "Crush" from Gould's album 1998.

== Discography ==
=== Studio albums ===
| Title | Album details | Peak chart positions |
| Title | Album details | AUS |
|---|---|---|
| Zoë | Released: 5 August 2011; Formats: CD, digital download; Label: Neon Records | 35 |

=== Singles ===
| Title | Year | Peak chart positions | | Certifications | Album |
| Title | Year | AUS | AUS Club | Certifications | Album |
|---|---|---|---|---|---|
| "Release Me" | 2008 | — | 1 | | Zoë |
| "Don't Wan'cha" | 2009 | — | 7 | | —N/a |
| "In the Moment" | 2009 | — | 6 | | Zoë |
| "Freefallin" | 2010 | 9 | 1 | ARIA: Platinum | Zoë |
| "Accidents Happen" | 2011 | 71 | 7 | | Zoë |
| "Carry Me Home" (with Grant Smillie) | 2011 | 115 | 6 | | Zoë |
| "A Million Lights" (Grant Smillie and Walden featuring Zoë Badwi) | 2012 | — | 6 | | —N/a |
| "Shoot Me Down" | 2012 | — | — | | —N/a |
| "Torches" | 2013 | — | — | | —N/a |
| "My Way with You" (2 Faced Funks featuring Zoë Badwi) | 2013 | — | — | | —N/a |
| "Spasmodic Pop" (featuring EXL) | 2014 | — | — | | —N/a |
| "Love Me Baby" (Tenzin featuring Zoë Badwi) | 2016 | — | — | | —N/a |
| "I Must Have Died" (Paki & Jaro featuring Zoë Badwi) | 2016 | — | — | | —N/a |
| "Horny" (The Potbelleez featuring Zoë Badwi) | 2016 | — | 9 | | —N/a |
| "Time to Reload" (Holmes John featuring Zoë Badwi) | 2018 | — | 10 | | —N/a |
| "Sold My Soul" (Dan Slater featuring Zoë Badwi) | 2018 | — | — | | —N/a |
| "Release Me 2019" (with TV Rock) | 2019 | — | 26 | | —N/a |
| "Body Drive" (MorningMaxwell and Wildfire featuring Zoë Badwi) | 2019 | — | 17 | | —N/a |
| "Body Pop" (Kuhl Kuhl, Ivan Gough and Zoë Badwi) | 2019 | — | 18 | | —N/a |
| "Hold Me" (Dan Slater and Anthony May featuring Zoë Badwi and Rob Harris) | 2019 | — | — | | —N/a |
| "This Is a Raid" (Needs No Sleep, MKJAY and Zoë Badwi) | 2020 | — | 6 | | —N/a |
| "We Are" (Dan Slater and Zoë Badwi) | 2021 | — | — | | —N/a |
| "Until You're Over Me" (Johnny I. and Zoë Badwi) | 2021 | — | — | | —N/a |
| "I've Been Waiting" (Dan Slater and Zoë Badwi) | 2022 | — | — | | —N/a |
| "Keep It Coming" (Mr Gray featuring Zoë Badwi) | 2022 | — | — | | —N/a |
| "Listen to Love" (with Nick Jay, Jet Boot Jack) | 2022 | — | — | | —N/a |
| "Don't Mess with My Man" (with Sgt Slick) | 2022 | — | 1 | | —N/a |
| "One Last Time" | 2023 | — | 16 | | —N/a |
| "Do It Again" (with Steve Hart) | 2023 | — | 32 | | —N/a |
| "Stralight" (with Jimi The Kween) | 2024 | — | — | | —N/a |
| "Sexual" (with James Alexandr) | 2025 | — | — | | —N/a |
| "I Start to Wonder" (with Nick Jay and Jean Luc) | 2025 | — | — | | —N/a |
| "The Only Way Is Up" (with James Alexandr) | 2026 | — | 14 | | |
"—" denotes releases that did not chart.

== Awards and nominations ==
| Year | Type | Award | Result |
|---|---|---|---|
| 2009 | ARIA Music Awards | Best Dance Release ("Release Me") | Nominated |
| 2010 | APRA Awards | Dance Work of the Year ("Release Me") | Nominated |
| 2010 | IT List Awards | Breakthrough Artist of 2010 | Won |
| 2010 | IT List Awards | Australian Female Artist | Nominated |
| 2010 | IT List Awards | Single of 2010 ("Freefallin'") | Nominated |
| 2011 | APRA Awards | Dance Work of the Year ("Freefallin") | Won |
| 2011 | ARIA Music Awards | Breakthrough Artist – Single ("Freefallin") | Nominated |
| 2011 | IT List Awards | Single of 2011 ("Freefallin'") | Nominated |
| 2011 | IT List Awards | Album of 2011 (Zoë) | Nominated |
| 2011 | IT List Awards | Australian Female Artist | Nominated |
