= Bimbo Nation =

Single by TV Rock featuring Nancy Vice

from the album Sunshine City
- Released: 30 September 2006
- Recorded: 2005
- Studio: Bimbo Rock studios, Melbourne, Victoria
- Genre: Dance
- Length: 3:13
- Label: Sony BMG
- Songwriter(s): Ivan Gough; Grant Smillie
- Producer(s): Ivan Gough; Grant Smillie

TV Rock singles chronology
"Flaunt It" (2006)	"Bimbo Nation" (2006)	"The Others" (2007)

"Bimbo Nation" is the second single from TV Rock's debut album Sunshine City.

== Track listing ==
Australian CD single

1. "Bimbo Nation" (TV Rock Radio Mix clean version) – 3:14
2. "Bimbo Nation" (TV Rock Radio Mix dirty version) – 3:13
3. "Bimbo Nation" (TV Rock Mainroom Mix) – 6:28
4. "Bimbo Nation" (Tonite Only's Fuck Tomorrow Vocal Mix) – 7:04
5. "Bimbo Nation" (Dirty South Mix) – 7:17

== Chart performance ==
"Bimbo Nation" debuted at number 38 on the Australian ARIA singles chart on 16 October 2006, before climbing to 32.

"Bimbo Nation" stayed in the Top 50 of the Australian charts for 7 consecutive weeks.

Chart performance for "Bimbo Nation"
Chart (2006)	Peak position
Australian ARIA Singles	32
Australian ARIA Dance Singles	3
Australian ARIA Club Chart	5
Finland (Suomen virallinen lista)	11
