= Dukes of Windsor =

Australian electronic rock group

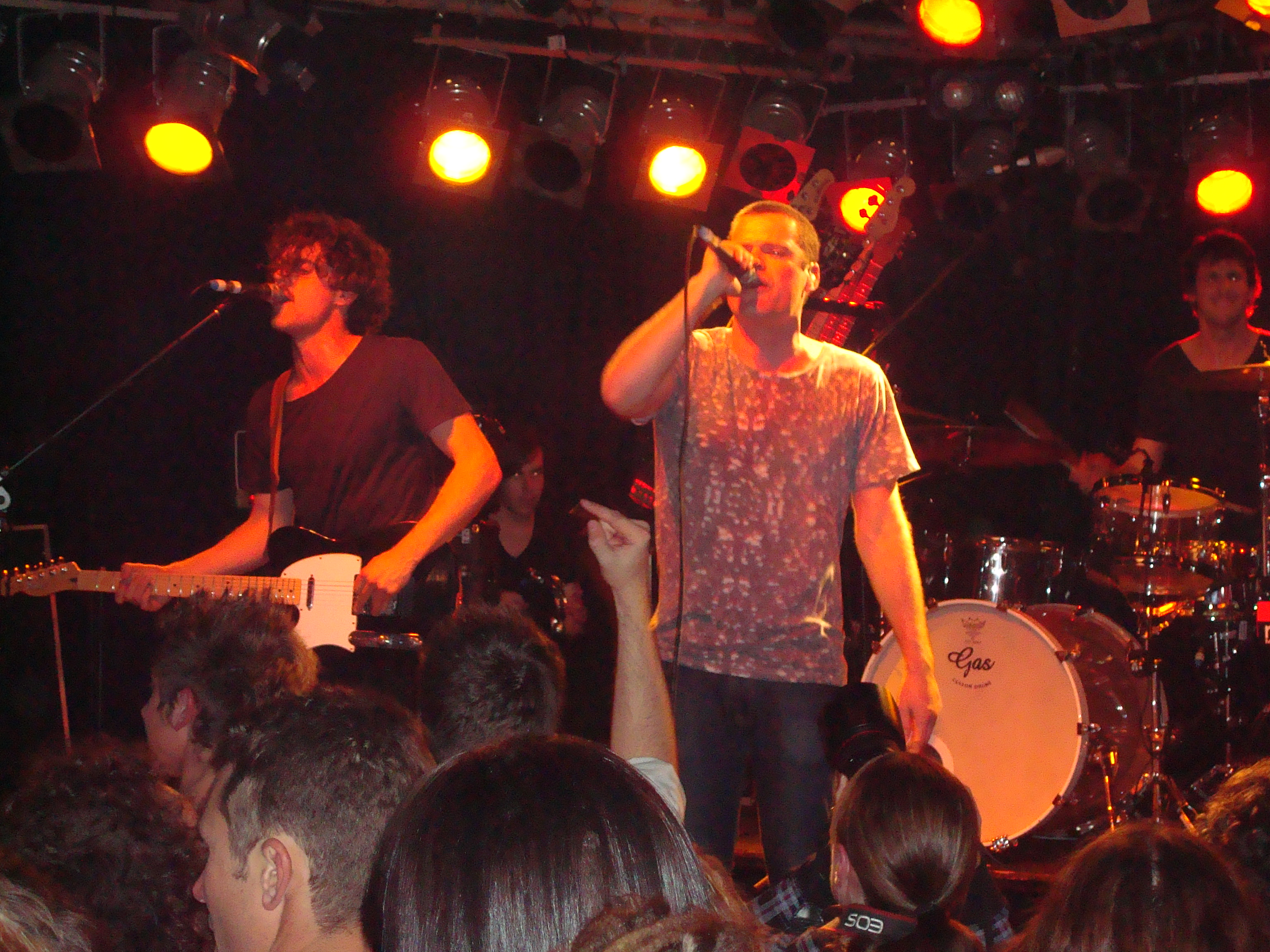

Background information
- Origin: Melbourne, Australia
- Genres: Indie rock; indie electronic; house
- Years active: 2004–2010
- Labels: Independent/MGM, Island
- Past members: Cory Blight; Jack Weaving; Oscar Dawson; Joe Franklin; Scott Targett; Mirra Seigerman; Bobby Manila
- Website: dukesofwindsor.com.au

Dukes of Windsor were an Australian electronic rock group formed in 2004. They relocated to Berlin in 2009, where they disbanded in the following year. They are notable for their 2006 single "The Others", remixed by Australian electronic group TV Rock the following year, and "It's a War", released in Australia in 2008 and in Europe in early 2010. They "fuse minimalist rhythms, punchy bass-lines, cascading guitar riffs, and glacial synths". Their music has been described as "angular and reductive, groovy and melodic", and has been termed the beautiful paradox of "robotic soul".

== History ==
Dukes of Windsor were formed in late 2004 in Melbourne by Cory Bright on drums and Jack Weaving on vocals. Bright and Weaving had been bandmates in the Surrogate. After writing material together they recruited Oscar Dawson on guitar, Joe Franklin on bass guitar and Scott Targett (also ex-the Surrogate) on keyboards to start performing as Dukes of Windsor. Their debut release was the six-track extended play Foxhunt in August 2005. It was produced by Swedish-born Pelle Henricsson and Eskil Lövström (Refused, Poison the Well, Hell Is for Heroes).

The group's debut studio album The Others was issued in September 2006, which was produced in Melbourne by expatriate American Jonathan Burnside (Faith No More, Nirvana). Extra production, mixing and mastering were provided by Henricsson and Lövström at Tonteknik Studios in Umea, Sweden.

The title track had been issued as the lead single in August 2006. In support of the album, the band toured Australia, initially backing the Butterfly Effect before undertaking a co-headline tour with the Inches. After national radio play, they were showcased as a Next Crop Artist by national youth broadcaster Triple J in November 2006. "The Others" was remixed by Australian electronic music duo TV Rock, which was released as a single on 13 March 2007 by TV Rock vs. Dukes of Windsor. It reached number ten on the ARIA singles chart and number one on both Australia's ARIA Dance and Club Tracks charts. "The Others" was certified Gold in Australia (50,000 copies), was a top 10 ARIA single, spent three months at number one on the ARIA Club Tracks chart and received an ARIA Award nomination for ARIA Award for Best Dance Release in 2007. The five-piece also closed the MTV Australian Music Video Awards ceremony in Sydney that year.

Second album Minus was released through Island Records in Australia in late 2008. To record the album, the band reunited with Pelle and Eskil, travelling to Tonteknik Studios in the Swedish winter. The album's title both represents these sub-zero temperatures, as well as the fresh clinical approach to the album. The stark sound is balanced with warm synth textures and vocals.

After the release of Minus, the band took in a string of sell-out gigs in capital cities, as well as completing dates nationally with Sneaky Sound System, Sam Sparro, The Music and The Vines. The band also featured heavily on Australian national broadcaster Triple J, with two Number One Most Played songs, and television performances on both Rove Live ("It's a War") and The Footy Show ("Get It"). Three singles were released from Minus, including "It's a War", "Get It" (both 2008), and "Runaway" (2009). The video clip for "Runaway" was also featured as a Ripe Clip of the Week on national music television channel Channel [V].

In the video game Midnight Club: Los Angeles (2008) one of his songs makes an appearance which is the song is In The Wild.

In December 2009 the band relocated to Berlin, Germany to continue writing their third full-length album. After signing a management and joint venture deal with local indie label Motor Music, they also released the album It's a War, an album of selected songs from both Minus and The Others. Since then, they are preparing to self-produce their next full-length album.

== Band members ==
- Cory Blight – drums
- Jack Weaving – vocals
- Oscar Dawson – guitars
- Joe Franklin – bass guitar
- Scott Targett – keyboards, programming
- Mirra Seigerman – drums
- Bobby Manila

== Discography ==
=== Studio albums ===
List of studio albums, with Australian chart positions
Title	Album details	Peak chart positions
Title	Album details	AUS
The Others	Released: 2 September 2006; Label: Dukes of Windsor (DOW003); Formats: CD, download	—
Minus	Released: September 2008; Label: Isaland/UMA (V1768796); Formats: CD, LP	67

=== Compilation albums ===
List of compilation albums
Title	Album details
It's a War	Released: February 2010 (Europe); Label: Motor Music (MOT09952); Formats: CD, download

=== Extended plays ===
List of extended plays, with selected details
Title	EP details
Foxhunt	Released: August 2005; Label: Dukes of Windsor (DOW001); Formats: CD, download

=== Singles ===
Year	Title	Chart positions	Album
Year	Title	AUS	Album
2006	"The Others"	—	The Others
2006	"Handsome Man"	—	The Others
2006	"So Beautiful"	—	The Others
2006	"Tear This Party Down"	—	The Others
2007	"The Others" (vs. TV Rock)	10	Non-album single
2008	"It's a War"	67	Minus
2008	"Get It"	—	Minus
2009	"Runaway"	—	Minus
2009	"Crystal's Getting High"	—	Minus

== Awards and nominations ==
=== ARIA Music Awards ===
The ARIA Music Awards is an annual awards ceremony that recognises excellence, innovation, and achievement across all genres of Australian music.

Year	Nominee / work	Award	Result
2007	"The Others" (with TV Rock)	Best Dance Release	Nominated
