= Release Me (Zoë Badwi song) =

2008 single by Zoë Badwi

Single by Zoë Badwi

from the album Zoë
- Released: 15 November 2008
- Recorded: 2008
- Genre: House, electro
- Length: 3:26
- Label: Neon Records
- Songwriter(s): Zoë Badwi, Ivan Gough, Grant Smillie, C. Snape
- Producer(s): Ivan Gough, Grant Smillie

Zoë Badwi singles chronology
"Release Me" (2008)	"Don't Wan'cha" (2009)

Music video
- "Release Me" on YouTube

"Release Me" is the debut solo single by Australian singer Zoë Badwi, released digitally on 15 November 2008. It was co-written by Badwi, Ivan Gough, Grant Smillie and Colin Snape. "Release Me" reached number one on the ARIA Clubs Chart and received two nominations including "Best Dance Release" at the 2009 ARIA Music Awards and "Dance Work of the Year" at the 2010 APRA Awards.

== Background ==
In an interview with Auspop, Badwi stated that while she was playing with her band at a venue in Melbourne, Grant Smillie of Australian duo TV Rock was having a Sunday afternoon drink and that she saw him tapping his foot. "He came up to me afterwards and he said You’re great, do you write your own stuff?. I said, yeah, I sure do and he said, I’ll send you some beats – and we’ll see what happens. So he sent me some beats and I wrote "Release Me" and went around to sing it to him and the other guy from TV Rock [Ivan Gough] and they both just said yep, we love it."

== Music video ==
The music video for "Release Me" was filmed during a performance by Badwi at the Sensation Dance Party on New Year's Eve 2008. She explained, "They were just looking for someone to sing on the new years eve countdown. And then they asked me and we thought it was being filmed anyway, we should see about using that as my film clip for the single. Turns out they used it as promo for the party all over the world." It was released on 15 January 2009.

== Charts ==
"Release Me" reached number one on the ARIA Clubs Chart and stayed in that position for seven weeks.

Chart (2008)	Peak position
ARIA Clubs Chart	1

== Track listings ==
- Digital download
1. Release Me (TV Rock Edit) – 3:26
2. Release Me (J Nitti Mix) – 6:22
- Italy vinyl
1. Release Me (TV Rock edit) – 6:45
2. Release Me (Mind Electric Mix) – 5:38
3. Release Me (J Nitti Mix) – 6:22
4. Release Me (Ryan Riback "Raise Your Hands" Mix) – 6:34
- UK CDr
1. Release Me (Radio Edit) – 3:31
2. Release Me (TV Rock Mix) – 6:50
3. Release Me (J Nitti Mix) – 6:27
4. Release Me (Ryan Riback Mix) – 6:39
5. Release Me (Mind Electric 12" Mix) – 5:41
6. Release Me (Mind Electric Dub Mix) – 5:41
- AUS/UK Remixes
1. Release Me (UK Radio Edit) – 3:04
2. Release Me (TV Rock Edit) – 6:45
3. Release Me (Cahill Radio Edit) – 3:30
4. Release Me (Cahill Club Mix) – 6:23
5. Release Me (Pitron & Sanna Mix) – 8:15
6. Release Me (Niels Van Gogh Mix) – 6:07

== Release history ==
Country	Date	Format
Italy	6 November 2008	Vinyl
Australia	15 November 2008	Digital download
United Kingdom	2009 & 24 October 2010	CD-R & Digital Download
