= The Others (Dukes of Windsor album) =

Studio album by Dukes of Windsor
- Released: 2 September 2006
- Genre: Pop-punk; rock
- Label: Dukes of Windsor; MGM

Dukes of Windsor chronology
Foxhunt (2005)	The Others (2006)	Minus (2008)

Singles from The Others
- 1. "The Others" Released: 17 July 2006; 2. "Handsome Man" Released: 2006; 3. "So Beautiful" Released: 2006; 4. "Tear This Party Down" Released: 2006

The Others is the debut studio album by Australian music collective Dukes of Windsor, released on 2 September 2006.

== Critical reception ==
Professional ratings
Review scores
Source	Rating
AllMusic	3.5/5 stars
PopMatters	5/10

Ned Raggett of AllMusic wrote that "the elements are all plenty familiar at this point, so what makes The Others work lies in the arrangements – if the songs are brisk and the synth crunches, tight-as-hell riffs, and punching drums are just so, things are still not quite normal throughout", concluding that "they work right in their own time, and that really is all that matters". Dan Raper of PopMatters found that the "best thing about them is their youth, and from it comes their energy", also remarking that "most of the time these songs ride a catchy line between sleazy synths and pop-punk. The songwriting's pretty similar throughout – stomping uptempo rock, with simple 4/4 drums and snippets of radio-catchy chorus that slide off into edgy synth vamps".

== Track listing ==
The Others track listing
No.	Title	Length
1.	"You Scream"	2:07
2.	"The Others"	3:28
3.	"Handsome Man"	2:54
4.	"So Beautiful"	4:24
5.	"A la Na Na Na"	3:14
6.	"Banter"	0:43
7.	"Lover Now"	4:22
8.	"Kings of Sound"	3:11
9.	"The Pretty Girls"	5:17
10.	"Boy Inside the Radio"	2:31
11.	"Tear This Party Down"	4:28
12.	"Children of Tomorrow"	4:37

== Release history ==
Release history and formats for The Others
Region	Date	Label	Format	Catalogue
Australia	2 September 2006	Dukes of Windsor, MGM	CD; digital download	DOW003
