= Zoë (album) =

Studio album by Zoë Badwi
- Released: 5 August 2011
- Recorded: 2008–2011
- Genre: Pop, dance
- Label: Neon Records
- Producer: TV Rock

Singles from Zoë
- 1. "Release Me" Released: 15 November 2008; 2. "In The Moment" Released: 16 October 2009; 3. "Freefallin" Released: 16 July 2010; 4. "Accidents Happen" Released: 24 January 2011; 5. "Carry Me Home" Released: 3 June 2011

Zoë is the debut album by Australian singer Zoë Badwi. It was recorded over a span of nearly three years. It was finally released after her breakthrough single "Freefallin" reached the top 10 of the ARIA Singles Charts. Five of Zoë's six singles are featured on the album.

== Reception ==
Cyclone Wehner from The Herald Sun gave the album 4 out of 5 saying; "Melbourne's Zoe Badwi is bringing back the Euro-pop diva with her unpretentious debut." and while complementing the 'club bangers', said ""One Step Behind" is eerie underground "prog" house and "Believe You" is a splendid piano ballad Mariah Carey would covet." concluding it sounds like "music for a big Friday night".

== Track listing ==
Standard edition
| No. | Title | Writer(s) | Length |
|---|---|---|---|
| 1. | "Freefallin'" | Amy Pearson; Cameron Denny; Paul Zala | 3:16 |
| 2. | "Until You're Over Me" | Amy Pearson; Anthony Egizii | 3:28 |
| 3. | "Release Me" (TV Rock edit) | Zoë Badwi; Ivan Gough; Grant Smille | 3:26 |
| 4. | "Carry Me Home" (Grant Smillie edit) | Nalle Ahlstedt; Jaakko Salovaara; Michelle Leonard | 2:37 |
| 5. | "Accidents Happen" (Radio edit) | Negin; Stuart Crichton; Robert Conley | 3:07 |
| 6. | "Never Let You Go" | Badwi; Pearson; Gough; Smillie | 3:12 |
| 7. | "Reckless" | Badwi; Pearson; Egizii; David Musumeci | 3:20 |
| 8. | "One Step Behind" | Badwi; Pearson; Smillie; Nordean Wahid | 2:49 |
| 9. | "In the Moment" (Denzal Park edit) | Badwi; Gough; Smillie | 3:44 |
| 10. | "Believe You" | Badwi; Pearson; Colin Shape | 2:43 |
| 11. | "Relapse" | Badwi; Pearson; Smillie; Gough; Flynn Francis; Tim Metcalfe | 3:24 |
| 12. | "The Other Side" | Badwi; Pearson; Smillie; Nordean Wahid | 3:29 |

Zoë — iTunes (bonus tracks)
| No. | Title | Length |
|---|---|---|
| 13. | "The Other Side Minimix" | 29:36 |
| 14. | "Carry Me Home" (video) | 2:40 |

== Singles ==
- "Release Me"

Released as her debut single in later 2008, the single was a massive club smash hit, and peaked at #1 on the ARIA Club Chart. It was also nominated for two ARIA Awards in 2009. It failed to chart on the Top 100 Singles Chart.

- "In The Moment"

Released in October 2009, the song was another club hit, but like her previous single failed to reach the ARIA Singles chart.

- "Freefallin"

Released in July 2010, Freefallin is considered as her breakthrough single. Reaching #8 on the Singles Chart. It is nominated for the 2011 ARIA awards as Breakthrough single.

- "Accidents Happen"

Released in January 2011, the single was another club hit, and had a fair amount of radio play, but failed to live up to its predecessor's hit status. It peaked at #71 on the Singles chart.

- "Carry Me Home"

Carry Me Home was released as the album's fifth single a month before the album's release. It failed to reach the singles chart, but was another club and radio hit.

== Charts ==
| Chart (2011) | Peak position |
|---|---|
| Australian Albums (ARIA) | 35 |

== Release history ==
| Region | Date | Format | Edition(s) | Label | Catalogue |
|---|---|---|---|---|---|
| Australia | 5 August 2011 | CD; digital download | Standard / Deluxe | Neon Records | 5249871962 |
