= Peters & Peters =

American record producer

- Origin: Detroit, Michigan, United States
- Genres: Alternative rock, pop, pop rock, hard rock, electropop, dance, rock, country, hip hop
- Occupations: Record producers, songwriters, musicians, recording engineers
- Years active: 1998–present
- Members: Chris Peters; Drew Peters

Peters & Peters is the professional name for the American, Detroit, Michigan area record producers, songwriters and brothers Chris Peters and Drew Peters. They have collectively and individually written with or produced acts like The Black Eyed Peas, Kid Rock, Ted Nugent, Australian artists Holly Valance and Sarah McLeod, Canadian Idol finalist Tara Oram, Chinese actress and Super Girl winner Li Yuchun, and the British pop group Girls Aloud, who have sold 10 million albums worldwide.

"Don't Lie," a Grammy nominated song they wrote with The Black Eyed Peas, was a top 10 hit in many countries.

Chris Peters also played bass for the Electric Six under the name John R. Dequindre. Peters & Peters produced two albums for the Electric Six, Señor Smoke and Switzerland.

Chris is working on projects with soul singer Laura Lee and Motown guitarist Dennis Coffey.

== Selected discography ==
=== Album credits ===
- The Black Eyed Peas – Monkey Business (songwriting)
- Kid Rock – The History of Rock (songwriting)
- Girls Aloud – Sound of the Underground (songwriting, production)
- Holly Valance – State of Mind (songwriting, production)
- Li Yuchun – Chris Lee / (李宇春) (songwriting)
- Sarah McLeod – Beauty Was A Tiger (songwriting, production)
- Ted Nugent – Full Bluntal Nugity (production)
- Ted Nugent – Craveman (production)
- Brian Melo – Livin' It (songwriting)
- Aloha – Sugar (production)
- Aloha – That's Your Fire (production)
- One Be Lo – S.O.N.O.G.R.A.M. (engineering)
- Electric Six – Señor Smoke (songwriting, production)
- Electric Six – Switzerland (songwriting, production)
