= Don't Lie =

2005 single by the Black Eyed Peas

Single by the Black Eyed Peas

from the album Monkey Business
- B-side: "Shake Your Monkey"
- Released: June 29, 2005
- Studio: Metropolis (Chiswick, England); The Record Plant (Hollywood, California)
- Genre: Pop rap
- Length: 3:40 (album version); 3:29 (radio edit)
- Label: will.i.am; A&M
- Songwriters: William Adams; Allan Pineda; Jaime Gomez; Stacy Ferguson; Chris Peters; Drew Peters; Ricky Walters
- Producer: will.i.am

The Black Eyed Peas singles chronology
| "Don't Phunk with My Heart" (2005) | "Don't Lie" (2005) | "My Humps" (2005) |

Music video
- "Don't Lie" on YouTube

"Don't Lie" is a song performed by American recording group the Black Eyed Peas, taken from their fourth studio album, Monkey Business (2005). It was released as the second single from the album on June 29, 2005, after the successful "Don't Phunk with My Heart".

"Don't Lie" was written by the band together with the production duo Peters & Peters while band member will.i.am headed its production. It contains a vocal sample of Slick Rick's 1988 song "The Ruler's Back", from the album The Great Adventures of Slick Rick. The song was produced as a pop-oriented hip hop song with a Latin-tinged beat. The lyrics feature the lead character apologizing for lies made during his relationship with another woman. Critical reception for the song was generally positive, with many praising its lyrics, noting that they diverge from the dangerous and decadent lyrics in hip-hop music.

"Don't Lie" was commercially successful worldwide, nearly replicating the success of the album's previous single. It peaked at number 14 on the Billboard Hot 100 and became their fifth top 40 hit on the chart. The song reached the top 10 in several countries including Australia, Denmark, Italy and the UK. The music video for "Don't Lie" is set in Brazil.

== Background and composition ==
"Don't Lie" was written by all the members of the Black Eyed Peas along with songwriting and production duo Peters & Peters. The production of the song was mostly done by Adams under his stage name will.i.am while additional music production was orchestrated by Ron Fair. It was recorded at The Stewchia in Los Feliz, California. In addition to co-writing and producing the song, Adams engineered the track with Jason "ill-aroma" Villaroman and Tal Herzberg; Herzberg also programmed the song with the use of Pro Tools. Adams is also responsible for the drum machine and bass instruments performed on the song. Fair, along with providing additional production, also played the harmonica. George Pajon, Jr. and Ray Brady were featured on the track as its guitarists. The song was finally mixed by Mark "Spike" Stent, who also mixed the previous single "Don't Phunk with My Heart".

"Don't Lie"
A 21-second sample of "Don't Lie", which features the use of guitars melding together with Latin-tinged beats.

According to the digital music sheet published at Musicnotes.com by Hal Leonard Corporation, the song is written in a key of D major and maintains a tempo of 66 beats per minute. Christian Horder of Rolling Stone described "Don't Lie" as a "breezy, grooving romantic apology starring MC Will.i.am". Adams claims that the song was written from an experience in which he deceptively bended the truth to an ex-girlfriend. He further stated the song's lyrics: "It's a song about owning up and apologizing and realizing your faults. It's about being a man or a woman - an adult - and confronting situations honestly." "Don't Lie" was released as the second single from Monkey Business, after the successful "Don't Phunk with My Heart". Record label Interscope Records serviced the song to mainstream radios on July 26, 2005 in the United States.

== Critical reception ==
Tom Day of musicOMH dismissed the lyrics for not being as thought provoking as their previous singles and commented that the chorus was "poor" and the melody and sample were "plagiarised". The staff at Boston.com praised Fergie's vocals on the song, while commenting, "a nice change since she's often reduced to just singing hooks." Bill Lamb of About.com gave the song a three and a half star rating, highlighting the song's Latin-tinged beats, sentiment, and family-oriented lyrics as pros. Lamb also commented that the song maybe too pop-oriented for their hip-hop followers and found the lyrics to be less challenging. A reviewer for Contactmusic.com praised the song as a clever hip-hop song that diverges away from the dangerous lyrics present in most rap music and presents a family-friendly message.

== Chart performance ==
"Don't Lie" made its first appearance on the Billboard Hot 100 on August 13, 2005, entering at number eighty-one. It moved up to number 50 in the following week and up to 31 in the week after. In its fifth week, the song peaked at number 14, where it stayed for two weeks. "Don't Lie" lasted a total of 20 weeks on the chart and charted on several Billboard component charts, including the Pop Songs and Radio Songs.

"Don't Lie" proved to replicate the success of their previous single "Don't Phunk with My Heart" in European countries. In Austria, the song entered the singles chart at number 19 on August 28, 2005, and rose to number 12 in the next week. "Don't Lie" peaked at number six on September 11, 2005. On August 27, 2005, the song debuted on the Dutch Singles Chart at number 19. On September 10, 2005, it reached a peak at number seven. On August 28, 2005, "Don't Lie" debuted and peaked at number six on the UK Singles Chart and continued to chart for 10 weeks, selling a total of 125,000 copies.

In France, the song debuted at number 99 on the singles chart and rose to number 20 in the following week, becoming its peak position and the week's "greatest chart gainer". "Don't Lie" charted successfully in Oceanian countries. In Australia, it debuted and peaked at number six and continued charting for 18 more weeks. The song entered the New Zealand Top 40 on September 19, 2005, at number seven. On October 10, 2005, in its fourth week on the chart, the single peaked at number five after three weeks of holding at number seven. The song also proved successful in other European countries, peaking inside the top 10 in Denmark, Italy, and Norway and attained top 20 positions in Belgium, Germany, Ireland, Sweden, and Switzerland.

== Music video ==
The music video for the song was directed by The Saline Project. It starts off with a still photograph of all four members of the Black Eyed Peas. The members start moving as the music picks up pace and then dance a little. The 'photograph' establishes that the video is set in Brazil by showing Rio de Janeiro. Later in the video, other iconographic locations are shown, such as the rainforest and the slums. First up, will.i.am sings his verse. As he rides on his scooter, he suddenly spots himself and an ex-girlfriend arguing. He stops the scooter and walks by them, still singing his part. Then we switch to Fergie, walking in a bikini-top and a sarong-like bottom and singing the hook. Its Apl's turn after it, he sings his verse as we are shown clips of him and Taboo flirting. Again, Fergie sings the hook. Then finally, Taboo takes over for the bridge/third verse. And this time, the wardrobe and the scenario changes. All four members of the Black Eyed Peas are now on-stage at a mini-concert in Parque Lage in Rio. Taboo seemingly sings to a girl standing in the very first row. Near the end of his verse, however, it is shown that there are several versions of the girl in different outfits, all dancing with different men. Fergie dances and sings the verse. This goes on until the end, when the camera zooms out on another still photograph of the band posing.

Part of the music video is set in the same building at Parque Lage in Rio de Janeiro that Snoop Dogg's music video for "Beautiful" is, but filmed around two years ago. However, the courtyard actually contains a pool (visible in the Snoop Dogg video) that is ignored in computer-generated image composition in the "Don't Lie" video—the partygoers would actually be falling in the water. In real life, the building serves as a community art school, although it does occasionally hold intimate jazz performances.

== Track listings ==
UK and European CD single

1. "Don't Lie"
2. "Shake Your Monkey"

Australian CD single

1. "Don't Lie" – 3:40
2. "Shake Your Monkey" – 3:54
3. "Don't Lie" (Beets & Produce NY mix) – 4:07
4. "Don't Lie" (video)

Japanese CD single

1. "Don't Lie"
2. "Don't Phunk with My Heart" (Chicago house remix)

== Credits and personnel ==
Credits adapted from the liner notes of Monkey Business, A&M Records, will.i.am Music Group, Interscope Records.

Recording and sample

- Recorded at Metropolis Studios in Chiswick, London, England and The Record Plant in Los Angeles, California.
- Contains elements of "The Ruler's Back", written by Ricky Walters under Songs Of Universal, Inc. (BMI)

Personnel

- Songwriting – William Adams, Jaime Gomez, Allan Pineda, Stacy Ferguson, Chris Peters, Drew Peters, Ricky Walters
- Production – will.i.am, Ron Fair (additional)
- Recording Engineers – will.i.am, Jason "ill-aroma" Villaroman, Tal Herzberg
- Pro Tools music programming – Tal Herzberg
- Drum machine and bass – will.i.am
- Guitars – George Pajon, Jr., Ray Brady
- Harmonica – Ron Fair
- Mixing – Mark "Spike" Stent
- Vocals – will.i.am, Fergie, Taboo, apl.de.ap

== Charts ==
=== Weekly charts ===
Weekly chart performance
| Chart (2005) | Peak position |
|---|---|
| Australia (ARIA) | 6 |
| Australian Urban (ARIA) | 3 |
| Austria (Ö3 Austria Top 40) | 6 |
| Belgium (Ultratop 50 Flanders) | 14 |
| Belgium (Ultratop 50 Wallonia) | 19 |
| Canada CHR/Pop Top 30 (Radio & Records) | 1 |
| Canada Hot AC Top 30 (Radio & Records) | 5 |
| CIS Airplay (TopHit) | 10 |
| Czech Republic Airplay (ČNS IFPI) | 56 |
| Denmark (Tracklisten) | 9 |
| European Hot 100 Singles (Billboard) | 10 |
| France (SNEP) | 20 |
| Germany (GfK) | 12 |
| Germany Airplay (BVMI) | 2 |
| Greece (IFPI) | 15 |
| Hungary (Rádiós Top 40) | 5 |
| Ireland (IRMA) | 11 |
| Italy (FIMI) | 8 |
| Netherlands (Dutch Top 40) | 4 |
| Netherlands (Single Top 100) | 7 |
| New Zealand (Recorded Music NZ) | 5 |
| Norway (VG-lista) | 7 |
| Russia Airplay (TopHit) | 9 |
| Scottish Singles Sales (Official Charts) | 7 |
| Spain (Promusicae) | 16 |
| Sweden (Sverigetopplistan) | 19 |
| Switzerland (Schweizer Hitparade) | 11 |
| UK Singles (Official Charts) | 6 |
| UK Hip Hop/R&B (Official Charts) | 1 |
| Ukraine Airplay (TopHit) | 112 |
| US Billboard Hot 100 | 14 |
| US Adult Pop Airplay (Billboard) | 38 |
| US Pop Airplay (Billboard) | 12 |

=== Year-end charts ===
Year-end chart performance
| Chart (2005) | Position |
|---|---|
| Australia (ARIA) | 48 |
| Brazil (Crowley) | 33 |
| CIS Airplay (TopHit) | 92 |
| European Hot 100 Singles (Billboard) | 65 |
| Hungary (Rádiós Top 40) | 33 |
| Netherlands (Dutch Top 40) | 25 |
| Netherlands (Single Top 100) | 61 |
| New Zealand (Recorded Music NZ) | 40 |
| Romania (Romanian Top 100) | 63 |
| Russia Airplay (TopHit) | 76 |
| Switzerland (Schweizer Hitparade) | 87 |
| UK Singles (OCC) | 60 |
| US Billboard Hot 100 | 81 |
| US Mainstream Top 40 (Billboard) | 63 |
| Venezuela (Record Report) | 13 |

== Certifications ==
Certifications and sales
| Region | Certification | Certified units/sales |
|---|---|---|
| Australia (ARIA) | Gold | 35,000^{^} |
| Brazil (Pro-Música Brasil) | Gold | 30,000^{‡} |
| New Zealand (RMNZ) | Platinum | 30,000^{‡} |
| United Kingdom (BPI) | Silver | 200,000^{‡} |
^{^} Shipments figures based on certification alone.^{‡} Sales+streaming figures based on certification alone.

== Release history ==
Release dates and formats
| Region | Date | Format(s) | Label(s) | Ref. |
|---|---|---|---|---|
| Japan | June 29, 2005 | CD | Universal Music | |
| United States | July 26, 2005 | Contemporary hit radio | A&M; Interscope | |
| Germany | August 15, 2005 | Maxi CD | Universal Music | |
| Australia | August 22, 2005 | Maxi CD | Universal Music | |
| United Kingdom | August 22, 2005 | CD | Polydor | |
| France | August 23, 2005 | CD | Polydor | |
| France | September 12, 2005 | Maxi CD | Polydor | |
