= I Shall Exterminate Everything Around Me That Restricts Me from Being the Master =

Studio album by Electric Six
- Released: October 9, 2007
- Genres: Funk rock; alternative rock; neo-psychedelia; glam metal
- Length: 50:33
- Label: Metropolis Records
- Producer: Zach Shipps

Electric Six chronology
Switzerland (2006)	I Shall Exterminate Everything Around Me That Restricts Me from Being the Master (2007)	Flashy (2008)

Professional ratings
Review scores
Source	Rating
AllMusic	4/5 stars
Pitchfork	5.6/10
Time Off	3/5 stars
PopMatters	6/10

I Shall Exterminate Everything Around Me That Restricts Me from Being the Master is the fourth album by the Detroit rock band Electric Six.

Music videos were made for the tracks "Down at McDonaldz" and "Randy's Hot Tonight!".

== Track listing ==
All lyrics written by Tyler Spencer, music composition noted below.

I Shall Exterminate Everything Around Me That Restricts Me from Being the Master track listing
No.	Title	Writer(s)	Length
1.	"It's Showtime!"	Zach Shipps	1:53
2.	"Down at McDonaldz"	Tyler Spencer/Shipps	4:01
3.	"Dance Pattern"	Spencer/Shipps	3:41
4.	"Rip It!"	Spencer/Shipps	3:37
5.	"Feed My Fuckin' Habit"	Spencer/Shipps	2:11
6.	"Riding on the White Train"	Spencer/Shipps	2:48
7.	"Broken Machine"	Christopher Tait	3:16
8.	"When I Get to the Green Building"	Spencer/Shipps	3:54
9.	"Randy's Hot Tonight!"	John Nash	3:04
10.	"Kukuxumushu"	Spencer	3:51
11.	"I Don't Like You"	Spencer	2:53
12.	"Lucifer Airlines"	Nash	2:53
13.	"Lenny Kravitz"	Spencer	3:06
14.	"Fabulous People"	Spencer/Shipps	2:27
15.	"Sexy Trash"	Nash/Shipps	2:08
16.	"Dirty Looks"	Nash/Shipps	4:46
Total length:			50:32

All lyrics written by Tyler Spencer, except where noted below.

2026 Remaster
No.	Title	Writer(s)	Length
17.	"The Sheik Don't Lie"		2:17
18.	"One"	Harry Nilsson	3:19
19.	"Randy's Hot Tonight! (demo)"		2:45
20.	"Lenny Kravitz (demo)"		2:37
21.	"It's Showtime! (remix - stage intro)"		1:33

== Personnel ==
- Dick Valentine – vocals
- John Nash (Johnny Na$hinal) – lead guitar
- Zach Shipps (The Colonel) – rhythm guitar
- Tait Nucleus? – keyboards
- Keith Thompson (Smorgasbord) – bass
- Mike Alonso (Percussion World) – drums

== Other information ==
- The title of the album comes from a 1921 cartoon drawing by George Grosz.
- The album artwork is taken from a painting called The Long Arm of the Law by Detroit artist Ron Zakrin, who was also behind the artwork for the band's follow-up album Flashy.
- The song "Kukuxumushu" (or Kukuxumusu) is Basque for "Flea's Kiss". Kukuxumusu is also a Spanish clothing brand. Tyler Spencer wrote the song after seeing a Kukuxumusu clothing shop whilst on tour, and deciding that he liked the word and wanted to use it.
- The song "Down at McDonnelzzz" was originally written as an interlude for inclusion on Switzerland, continuing the tradition of interludes on Señor Smoke. It was shelved specifically to allow it to be expanded into a full song on this album. The original "demo" version of the song was subsequently released on Sexy Trash.

== Charts ==
Chart performance for I Shall Exterminate Everything Around Me That Restricts Me from Being the Master
Chart (2007)	Peak position
US Billboard Top Electronic Albums	5
US Billboard Top Heatseekers	50
