= Accidents Happen (song) =

Single by Zoe Badwi

from the album Zoë
- Released: 24 January 2011
- Length: 3:08
- Label: Neon
- Songwriters: Robert Conley; Stuart Crichton; Negin Djafari

Zoe Badwi singles chronology
"Freefallin" (2010)	"Accidents Happen" (2011)	"Carry Me Home" (2011)

Music video
- "Accidents Happen" on YouTube

"Accidents Happen" is the fourth single to be taken from Australian singer Zoë Badwi's debut album Zoë.

== Track listing ==
Digital single

1. Accidents Happen - 3:08
2. Freefallin (Acoustic) - 2:43

Remix EP

1. Accidents Happen (Liam Keegan Remix) - 6:00
2. Accidents Happen (I Am Sam Remix) - 7:10
3. Accidents Happen (Walden Remix - 6:02
4. Accidents Happen (Fabian Gray & Emanuele Remix) - 7:00

== Music video ==
During filming for the video, Badwi and the crew were "fired upon by catapult" by someone who lived in the street where it was filmed

== Charts ==
Chart (2011)	Peak position
ARIA Singles Chart	71
ARIA Australian Singles	10
ARIA Club Chart	7
ARIA Dance Chart	13
