= Gay Bar (song) =

2003 single by Electric Six

Single by Electric Six

from the album Fire
- B-side: "Don't Be Afraid of the Robot"; "Take Off Your Clothes"; "The Living End"
- Released: June 2, 2003
- Genre: Garage punk; garage rock; disco metal
- Length: 2:20
- Label: XL
- Songwriter: Tyler Spencer
- Producers: Stuart Bradbury; Damien Mendis

Electric Six singles chronology
"Danger! High Voltage" (2002)	"Gay Bar" (2003)	"Dance Commander" (2003)

"Gay Bar" is a song by American rock band Electric Six. Written by band member Tyler Spencer under the pseudonym Dick Valentine, it was released on June 2, 2003, as the second single from their debut studio album, Fire (2003). While both the song and music video received significant airplay, words mentioning war were amended due to their possibly offensive nature, since the song made its air debut at the start of the Iraq War.

== Background and writing ==
According to Spencer/Valentine, the idea for the song came up from incorrectly hearing the lyrics of Devo's "Girl U Want" as "it's just a girl, it's just a girl at a gay bar" while the song was playing in a very loud nightclub. (The actual lyric is "She's just the girl, she's just the girl, the girl you want".)

=== Censorship ===
In the censored version of the song, the words "nuclear" and "war" (in the line "let's start a war, start a nuclear war") are cut out and a whiplash sound is used instead. A radio version in Japan and the United Kingdom exists in which the same lyrics are replaced with "let's do an edit, do a radio edit".

== Music video ==
The music video, directed by Tom Kuntz and Mike Maguire, was recorded in April 2003 at a movie studio in Toronto, Ontario, Canada. The video depicts a series of Abraham Lincoln look-alikes in the White House, portrayed primarily by the band's lead singer Dick Valentine, but doubles were used for some scenes.

== Awards ==
The song was nominated for the Kerrang! Award for Best Single. It also won Video of the Year award (2003) from both Kerrang and Q magazine.

== Track listings ==
UK, Australian, and New Zealand CD single

1. "Gay Bar"
2. "Don't Be Afraid of the Robot"
3. "Take Off Your Clothes"

UK 7-inch single

A. "Gay Bar"
B. "The Living End"

UK DVD single

1. "Gay Bar" (video)
2. "Gay Bar" (Peaches remix)
3. "Rockshow"

== Charts ==
=== Weekly charts ===
Chart (2003)	Peak position
Europe (Eurochart Hot 100)	20
Ireland (IRMA)	32
Scottish Singles Sales (Official Charts)	6
UK Singles (Official Charts)	5
UK Indie (Official Charts)	2

=== Year-end charts ===
Chart (2003)	Position
UK Singles (OCC)	155

== Certifications ==
Region	Certification	Certified units/sales
United Kingdom (BPI)	Silver	200,000^{‡}
^{‡} Sales+streaming figures based on certification alone.

== Legacy ==
- The band recorded "Gay Bar Part Two", a sequel to this song, for their album Flashy. The song was less of a direct sequel, opting instead to satirise their annoyance caused by people demanding a follow-up song as well as troubles with their previous record label demanding that they record "another Gay Bar".
- The band performed the song on their first live album Absolute Pleasure.
- The band performed the song in their live concert movie Absolute Treasure.
- A live performance of the song at Manumission Ibiza in 2004 was included on the band's compilation album Mimicry and Memories.

== Covers ==
Canadian electronic musician Peaches covered the song as a bonus track for her album Fatherfucker.

The Bosshoss played a cover of the song during their 2010 "Low Voltage" tour. A studio version was released on their album Stallion Battalion.

British comedy duo Armstrong & Miller parodied the "Gay Bar" in their series promotional video for BBC One in the United Kingdom.

Animator and comedian Joel Veitch, on his website Rathergood, covered the song in one of his Viking Kittens videos.
