= Sunshine City (album) =

Studio album by TV Rock
- Released: 25 November 2006
- Genre: Dance
- Length: 44:45
- Label: Sony BMG
- Producer: TV Rock

Singles from Sunshine City
- 1. "Flaunt It" Released: 19 February 2006; 2. "Bimbo Nation" Released: 30 September 2006

Sunshine City is the only album by Australian duo TV Rock, released on 25 November 2006 through Sony BMG.

== Track listing ==
1. "It Ain't Easy" (featuring Nancy Vice) – 3:18
2. "Bimbo Nation" (featuring Nancy Vice) – 3:13
3. "Hip House Is Back" (featuring Seany B) – 3:51
4. "Flaunt It" (featuring Seany B) – 3:26
5. "Unstoppable" (featuring Tyler Spencer) – 5:10
6. "Wild Boys" (featuring Nancy Vice) – 4:50
7. "Crank" (featuring Seany B) – 3:19
8. "Liftin' Me Up" (featuring Abigail Bailey) – 4:58
9. "Speakers Gonna Blow" (featuring Dino) – 3:09
10. "New Day" (featuring Nancy Vice) – 5:52
11. "The Power" (TV Rock vs. Tom Novy vs. Snap!) – 3:39

== Charts ==
Chart performance for Sunshine City
| Chart (2006–2007) | Peak position |
|---|---|
| Australian Albums (ARIA) | 141 |
