= Freefallin =

Single by Zoë Badwi

from the album Zoë
- Released: 16 July 2010
- Genre: Dance-pop; EDM; house
- Length: 3:16
- Label: Neon Records
- Songwriters: Cameron Denny, Amy Pearson, Paul Zala
- Producer: Denzal Park

Zoë Badwi singles chronology
"In the Moment" (2009)	"Freefallin" (2010)	"Accidents Happen" (2011)

Music video
- "Freefallin" on YouTube

"Freefallin" is a song performed by Australian singer-songwriter, Zoë Badwi. The dance-pop song was written by Cameron Denny, Amy Pearson and Paul Zala and produced by Denzal Park. It was released as a download on 16 July 2010. The song also serves as third single from her debut album Zoë (2011).

== Background ==
Badwi stated in an interview with the Herald Sun that as soon as she heard the track, it got her moving and that it was the first song she hadn't written. "Amy Pearson wrote the lyrics. It's the first one I haven't written. That was weird at first but it's such a good song I couldn't deny it. I've written with Amy before, we've got a good chemistry. She said, I think I've got a song you might like. I'll send it to you. I loved it."

== Track listing ==
=== Australian download ===
1. Freefallin (3:16)

=== French download ===
1. FreeFallin' (Radio Edit) (3:16)
2. FreeFallin' (6:07)
3. FreeFallin' (Acoustic) (2:43)

=== Complete download ===
1. Freefallin (Denzal Park Remix) (6:07)
2. Freefallin' (Tv Rock & Nordean Remix) (7:26)
3. Freefallin' (Moto Blanco Radio Edit) (3:38)
4. Freefallin' (WAWA Radio Edit) (2:35)
5. Freefallin' (Hardforze Remix) (5:26)
6. Freefallin' (Tune Brothers Remix) (7:45)
7. Freefallin' (Alex Mac 2.0 Remix) (6:07)
8. Freefallin' (Blaze Tripp Remix) (5:50)
9. Freefallin' (I Am Sam Remix) (6:52)
10. Freefallin' (UK Radio Edit) (2:35)
11. Freefallin' (Acoustic) (2:43)

== Charts ==
"Freefallin" debuted on the ARIA Singles Chart at number thirty six, before reaching its peak of number nine in its seventh week on the chart and was eventually certified platinum. The song peaked at number 71 on New Zealand Airplay Charts, staying for five weeks.

Chart (2010)	Peak position
ARIA Singles Chart	9
New Zealand Airplay Charts	71

=== Certification ===
Country	Certification
Australia	Platinum

=== Year-end charts ===
Chart (2010)	Position
ARIA Singles Chart	67
Australian Artists Singles Chart	6

== iTunes Release history ==
Country	Date	Label
Australia	16 July 2010	Neon Records
New Zealand	16 July 2010	Neon Records
Mexico	11 September 2010	Neon Records
Portugal	11 September 2010	Neon Records
Spain	11 September 2010	Neon Records
Sweden	11 September 2010	Neon Records
Italy	1 October 2010	Neon Records
United Kingdom	30 November 2010	Neon Records
Spain	7 December 2010	blanco y negro
France	14 March 2011	Neon Records
