= Minus (album) =

Studio album by Dukes of Windsor
- Released: 5 September 2008
- Studio: Tonteknik Recording AB, Umeå, Sweden
- Length: 41:51
- Label: Island, Universal
- Producer: Pelle Henricsson; Eskil Lövström

Dukes of Windsor chronology
The Others (2006)	Minus (2008)	It's a War (2010)

Singles from Minus
- 1. "It's a War" Released: 12 April 2008; 2. "Get It" Released: 20 September 2008; 3. "Runaway" Released: 27 February 2009; 4. "Crystal's Getting High" Released: 17 July 2009

Minus is the second studio album by Australian music collective Dukes of Windsor, released on 5 September 2008.

== Track listing ==
No.	Title	Length
1.	"No Disguise"	3:33
2.	"Evil Woman"	3:30
3.	"Runaway"	3:30
4.	"It's a War"	3:30
5.	"Land of Strangers"	3:56
6.	"Crystal's Getting High"	3:24
7.	"Get It"	3:33
8.	"In the Wild"	2:35
9.	"Snowlights"	3:34
10.	"Refuse"	4:06
11.	"Off the Radar"	3:31
12.	"We Defect"	3:16

iTunes edition bonus track
No.	Title	Length
13.	"It's a War" (Grafton Primary Remix)	4:02

== Charts ==
Chart (2008)	Peak position
Australian Albums (ARIA)	67

== Release history ==
Region	Date	Label	Format	Catalogue
Australia	5 September 2008	Island, Universal	CD, Digital download	1768796
Australia	5 September 2008	Island, Universal	12" vinyl	1783350
