= Evil Cowards =

American synth-pop band

- Origin: New York, U.S.
- Genres: Synth-pop, alternative dance, dance-rock, new wave
- Years active: 2009–present
- Label: Metropolis Records
- Members: Tyler Spencer; Will Bates
- Website: evilcowards.net at the Wayback Machine (archived 2014-05-17)

Evil Cowards is an American synth-pop band created by Tyler Spencer of Electric Six, and Will Bates of Fall On Your Sword.

== History ==
=== Formation and Covered in Gas (2009) ===
Evil Cowards was formed by Tyler Spencer (also known as Dick Valentine), lead singer of the rock band Electric Six, and William (Will) Bates, music composer and founder of the music production company Fall On Your Sword.

Of Evil Cowards compared with Electric Six, Spencer stated that:

[Evil Cowards] is much more synth-pop in nature, in Electric Six we feature the electronic guitar.

The band released their debut album, Covered in Gas, with Metropolis Records in May 2009, shortly before the release of the sixth Electric Six album, KILL.

=== Moving Through Security (2010–2012) ===
A February 2012 news item on the Electric Six website, attributed to Dick Valentine, suggested that 2012 would see the release of the Evil Cowards' second album. The album, titled Moving Through Security, was released in October that year. Unlike their debut, released by Metropolis Records, the band's second album was self-released without a record label.

Also in October 2012, the band released a music video for the song "Bedford Avenue Wine Distributors", taken from Moving Through Security.

== Discography ==
- Covered in Gas (2009)
- Moving Through Security (2012)
