= Shitting Glitter =

American avant-pop band

- Also known as: Spitting Glitter
- Origin: California
- Genres: Queercore, new wave, electronica rock, avant-pop, hard rock
- Years active: 2001–present
- Label: Decadrisco Records
- Members: Amy Crosby
- Past members: Devin Tait; Brandon Glen; Yvonne Edwards; Eddie Tyclus; Denny Ready; AJ Anderson; Red Fox; Laura Jennings
- Website: http://www.shittingglitter.com

Shitting Glitter is an American avant-pop band inspired by new wave and electronic rock. The band was formed in 2001 by Amy Crosby (vocals), Devin Tait (synths and vocals) and Yvonne "Mag" Edwards (guitar and vocals). After multiple lineup changes, Brandon Glen replaced Edwards as the guitar player and the trio released their debut album "Post No Bills" in 2003. 2006 saw the release of "Free Alongside Ship" on Decadrisco Records. The band has been labeled queercore, electroclash, and new wave and has played at many queer and gay festivals and events including Christopher Street West (L.A.'s Gay Pride Festival), Folsom Street Fair, and Reykjavik Gay Pride. They performed their single "Mondo di Corpo" on Q Television Network.

In 2010, the band released its third album, Open For Business, and announced a new lineup: Crosby and Tait were joined by new guitarist AJ Anderson and drummer Laura Jennings (formerly of the band Ask Alice), and Red Fox on bass (formerly of Messengers from the Sexual Frontier). Devin Tait left the band later in 2010, and the band switched to a harder rock sound. The band released their first EP without Tait, Ladies Things, later in 2010.

Although the band has only released three full-length albums, it has released numerous singles and EPs, beginning with the Hot Rod EP in February 2002. This EP contained the track "Strapping" which gained the band early recognition. A remix done by DJ Jonathan Morning was featured in the short film "Succubus" while the original version was included on Venus Envy's Women Who Rock compilation CD, a breast cancer benefit project. "R So" was released on Trocar Records on grey/purple 7" vinyl and included the original version of "Slut Buffet", the latter was also released as a limited edition CD single in the UK only. Two maxi-singles were released to precede "Free Alongside Ship": "The Incomparable White Six" in December 2004, and "Ladyslipper" in May 2005. "No Safe Words" was released as a limited edition CD single at Folsom Street Fair, and included a cover of Altered Images' hit "Happy Birthday". In June 2007, the band released an EP which included the Solar City remix of "Slut Buffet" as well as remixes by DJ Bill Dup and several new tracks. The band shot two videos to accompany the EP, "Mustache Rides" and "Delay" which was shot in Paradise, KS.

== Discography ==
=== Albums ===
- Post No Bills (2003)
- Free Alongside Ship (2006)
- Open For Business (2010)

=== EPs/Singles ===
- Hot Rod 2002
- Slut Buffet 2004
- R So (7" only) 2004
- Sexy Clown Circus 2005
- The Incomparable White Six 2005
- Ladyslipper 2005
- No Safe Words 2005
- Sidesaddle Sweet Talk (2007)
- I'm A Vampire (Digital only) 2009
- 19th And Lexington (Digital only) 2009
- The Man (Digital Only) 2010 (this was recorded some years before, however.)
- Ladies' Things 2010
