= Fire (Electric Six album) =

Studio album by Electric Six
- Released: May 20, 2003 (US)
- Recorded: 2000–2002
- Studios: White Room (Detroit, MI); Abbey Road (London); Ghetto Recorders (Detroit, MI)
- Genres: Funk rock; alternative rock; dance-punk; comedy rock; disco metal
- Length: 38:05
- Label: XL
- Producers: Stuart Bradbury; Damien Mendis

Electric Six chronology
Rock Empire (1999)	Fire (2003)	Señor Smoke (2005)

Singles from Fire
- 1. "Danger! High Voltage" Released: 2002; 2. "Gay Bar" Released: June 2, 2003; 3. "Dance Commander" Released: October 13, 2003

Fire is the debut studio album by American rock band Electric Six. It was released through XL Recordings on May 20 in the US and June 30 in the UK, 2003. It was preceded by the hit single "Danger! High Voltage", which peaked at number 2 on the UK Singles Chart. The album peaked at number 7 in the UK and received positive reviews from critics.

== Reception ==
Professional ratings
Aggregate scores
Source	Rating
Metacritic	70/100
Review scores
Source	Rating
AllMusic	4/5 stars
Blender	4/5 stars
The Boston Phoenix	3/4 stars
The Guardian	3/5 stars
Mojo	4/5 stars
Muzik	4/5 stars
Pitchfork	4.0/10
Q	3/5 stars
Rolling Stone	4/5 stars
The Village Voice	A−

=== Critical ===
The album received generally positive reviews from critics. At review aggregator site Metacritic, the album has an average critic score of 70/100, based on 20 reviews. Rolling Stone called the album "the summer's most brilliantly demented party record" and Blender hailed the music as "convincingly ferocious".

=== Commercial ===
Fire peaked at number 7 on the UK Albums Chart. The three singles released from the album all also charted. "Danger! High Voltage", which reached #10 in the U.S. Billboard Hot Dance Music/Maxi-Singles Sales chart and #2 in the UK Singles Chart; "Gay Bar", which reached #5 in the UK Singles Chart; and "Dance Commander", which reached #40 in the UK Singles Chart. Fire went gold in the United Kingdom on September 5, 2003.

== Track listing ==
All lyrics written by Tyler Spencer; all music composed by Tyler Spencer except where noted.

Fire track listing
No.	Title	Writer(s)	Length
1.	"Dance Commander"		2:37
2.	"Electric Demons in Love"		3:06
3.	"Naked Pictures (Of Your Mother)"		2:11
4.	"Danger! High Voltage"	Joe Frezza, Steve Nawara, Anthony Selph, Spencer	3:34
5.	"She's White"		3:16
6.	"I Invented the Night"		3:17
7.	"Improper Dancing"		3:14
8.	"Gay Bar"		2:20
9.	"Nuclear War (On the Dance Floor)"		1:16
10.	"Getting Into the Jam"		2:14
11.	"Vengeance and Fashion"		2:46
12.	"I'm the Bomb"		4:18
13.	"Synthesizer"		4:00
Total length:			38:05

Japanese bonus tracks
No.	Title	Length
14.	"Don't Be Afraid of the Robot"	1:40
15.	"Remote Control (Me)"	2:21
16.	"I Lost Control of My Rock & Roll"	1:47

Bonus DVD
No.	Title	Length
1.	"Danger! High Voltage"
2.	"Gay Bar"
3.	"Dance Commander"

21st Anniversary Expanded Edition Disc 2
No.	Title	Writer(s)	Length
14.	"I'm a Demon (and I Love Rock 'n Roll) (live)"	Roky Erickson	1:14
15.	"MC Sucka DJ"		2:14
16.	"Neurocameraman"		2:18
17.	"I Am the Knife (live solo acoustic, 1996)"		1:38
18.	"I Lost Control (Of My Rock n Roll)"		1:38
19.	"8-bit Gay Bar"		1:50
20.	"Don't Be Afraid of the Robot"		1:39
21.	"Synthesizer (demo)"		3:24
22.	"Rock Show"	Peaches	2:04
23.	"Danger! High Voltage (demo)"		3:33
24.	"Computer (demo)"		2:15
25.	"Radio Ga Ga (Fall of Saigon sessions)"		3:54
26.	"Nuclear Winter (Space Station, 1997)"		2:05
27.	"Jimmy Carter (Fall of Saigon sessions)"		3:28
28.	"I Am Detroit (Space Station, 1998)"		3:01

Disc 3
No.	Title	Writer(s)	Length
29.	"I Know Karate (7-inch release, 1996)"		2:37
30.	"Tiny Little Men (7-inch release, 1996)"		2:34
31.	"Gay Bar (7-inch release, 1996)"		1:54
32.	"Are You Afraid of the Devil? (live)"		2:35
33.	"I'm on Acid (live)"		2:02
34.	"Nuclear War (On the Dance Floor) (7-inch release, 1997)"		1:15
35.	"Christian Radio (Manchester) (demo)"		3:19
36.	"Xmas Exorcismus (Ho Ho Ho)"	Ennio Morricone	2:18
37.	"Dance Commander (2000 sessions)"		2:38
38.	"Danger! High Voltage (original single mix)"		3:50
39.	"Improper Dancing (demo)"		3:24
40.	"I'm the Bomb (Fall of Saigon sessions)"		4:15

== Personnel ==
- Dick Valentine – vocals
- Anthony Selph (The Rock-N-Roll Indian) – lead guitar
- Joe Frezza (Surge Joebot) – rhythm guitar
- Steve Nawara (Disco) – bass
- Cory Martin (M.) – drums
- Jack White – background vocals (track 4), credited as "John S. O'Leary"
- Jim Diamond - saxophone (track 4), credited as "Bill Clinton"

== Charts ==
Chart performance for Fire
Chart (2003)	Peak position
French Albums (SNEP)	150
Irish Albums (IRMA)	22
Scottish Albums (Official Charts)	7
UK Albums (Official Charts)	7
UK Independent Albums (Official Charts)	1
US Billboard Top Electronic Albums	5
US Billboard Top Independent Albums	38
