= TV Rock =

Australian dance music band (2004–2014)

- Origin: Melbourne, Victoria, Australia
- Genres: House
- Years active: 2004–2014
- Label: Warner Music
- Past members: Grant Smillie; Ivan Gough
- Website: tvrock.com.au

TV Rock were an Australian dance music duo consisting of Grant Smillie and Ivan Gough.

== Biography ==
TV Rock entered the mainstream in February 2006 with their hit "Flaunt It" featuring Seany B which reached #1 for five weeks, spent 39 weeks in the Australian ARIA Top 50 (including 31 weeks inside the Top 40), and won the 2006 ARIA Music Award for highest-selling single and best dance release.

TV Rock collaborated with Melbourne dance team Dukes of Windsor for their third single release "The Others" which reached No.10 in Australia in June 2007 and spent 20 weeks inside the Australian Top 50.

Their debut album, Sunshine City, was released on 25 November 2006.

The duo founded a dance record label, Neon Records, which manages fellow Melburnian DJs Dirty South & Denzal Park and singer Zoe Badwi.

In early 2013, Gough left TV Rock to pursue solo projects.

== Discography ==
=== Album ===
Title	Album details	Peak chart positions
Title	Album details	AUS
Sunshine City	Released: 27 November 2006; Label: Sony BMG (88697012102); Formats: CD, download	141

=== Singles ===
Year	Title	Peak chart positions					Certifications	Album
Year	Title	AUS	AUS Club	FIN	NZ	UK	Certifications	Album
2006	"Flaunt It" (featuring Seany B)	1	1	—	3	—	ARIA: 2× Platinum	Sunshine City
2006	"Bimbo Nation" (featuring Nancy Vice)	32	5	11	—	—		Sunshine City
2007	"The Power" (TV Rock vs. Tom Novy vs. Snap!)	—	3	—	—	—		Sunshine City
2007	"The Others" (TV Rock vs. Dukes of Windsor)	10	1	—	—	—	ARIA: Gold	Non-album singles
2008	"Been a Long Time" (featuring Rudy)	—	1	—	—	—		Non-album singles
2008	"Release Me" (with Zoë Badwi)	—	1	—	—	—		Zoë
2008	"Happiness (I'm Hurting Inside)" (with Luke Chable)	—	2	—	—	—		Non-album single
2009	"In the Air" (featuring Rudy)	37	1	—	—	43		Until One
2010	"I Am Techno"	—	—	—	—	—		Non-album singles
2010	"Elevated" (with Tara McDonald)	—	1	—	—	—		Non-album singles
2010	"Beatboxer"	—	—	—	—	—		Non-album singles
2011	"FIVEg" (Dave Spoon and TV Rock)	—	—	—	—	—		Non-album singles
2011	"Diamonds in the Sky" (with Hook n Sling featuring Rudy)	—	2	—	—	—		Non-album singles
2012	"Save Me Now" (featuring Dino)	—	—	—	—	—		Non-album singles
2014	"See Me Run" (with Walden)	—	43	—	—	—		Non-album singles
2019	"Release Me 2019" (Zoë Badwi and TV Rock)	—	26	—	—	—		Non-album singles

== Awards and nominations ==
=== APRA Awards ===
The APRA Awards have been presented annually since 1982 by the Australasian Performing Right Association (APRA).

Year	Nominee / work	Award	Result
2007	"Flaunt It" (Sean Berchik, Ivan Gough, Grant Smillie) – TV Rock featuring Seany B	Most Performed Dance Work	Won
2007	"Flaunt It" (Sean Berchik, Ivan Gough, Grant Smillie) – TV Rock featuring Seany B	Most Performed Australian Work	Nominated
2008	"The Others" (Cory Blight, Scott Targett, Jack Weaving) – TV Rock vs the Dukes of Windsor	Dance Work of the Year	Nominated

=== ARIA Music Awards ===
The ARIA Music Awards is an annual awards ceremony that recognises excellence, innovation, and achievement across all genres of Australian music.

Year	Nominee / work	Award	Result
2006	"Flaunt It" (with Seany B)	Best Dance Release	Won
2006	"Flaunt It" (with Seany B)	Highest Selling Single	Won
2006	"Flaunt It" (with Seany B)	Breakthrough Artist - Single	Nominated
2007	"The Others" (with Dukes of Winsor)	Best Dance Release	Nominated
