= Covered in Gas =

Studio album by Evil Cowards
- Released: May 19, 2009
- Recorded: 2008
- Length: 44:03
- Label: Metropolis
- Producer: Evil Cowards

Evil Cowards chronology
Covered in Gas (2009)	Moving Through Security (2012)

Covered in Gas is the debut album by Evil Cowards. It was released in 2009. A music video for "Love Pigs" was released on YouTube via Fall On Your Sword's official account.

== Track listing ==
1. "Love Pigs" – 3:36
2. "Sex Wars" – 3:17
3. "Theme from Evil Cowards" – 2:53
4. "500 Ways" – 4:36
5. "Soldiers of Satan" – 3:54
6. "My Mind Is Rotting" – 2:30
7. "Classon Ave. Robots" – 2:34
8. "I'm Not Scared of Flying Saucers" – 4:02
9. "Horrible People" – 3:18
10. "You Really Like Me" – 3:43
11. "Please Don't Make Me Feel You Again" – 3:15
12. "Zora and Nora" – 3:53
13. "Chopping Up the Teacher" – 2:32

Tyler Spencer provides the main vocals on all tracks except "Chopping Up the Teacher", which is performed by William Bates.

== Legacy ==
- Dick Valentine recorded an acoustic version of "Sex Wars" for his solo album "Quiet Time".
- Demos of the songs "Classon Ave. Robots", "I'm Not Scared of Flying Saucers" and "Zora and Nora" were subsequently released on "The Dick Valentine Raw Collection".
