= Switzerland (album) =

Studio album by Electric Six
- Released: September 12, 2006
- Recorded: November 2005
- Genre: Alternative rock
- Length: 42:15
- Label: Metropolis
- Producer: Peters & Peters

Electric Six chronology
Señor Smoke (2005)	Switzerland (2006)	I Shall Exterminate Everything Around Me That Restricts Me from Being the Master (2007)

Singles from Switzerland
- 1. "I Buy the Drugs" Released: August 15, 2006

Professional ratings
Aggregate scores
Source	Rating
Metacritic	49/100
Review scores
Source	Rating
AllMusic	4/5 stars
Alternative Press	3/5 stars
Blender	3/5 stars
musicOMH	1/5 stars
NME	6/10
Pitchfork	4.9/10
Q	2/5 stars
Spin	6/10
Stylus	B
Uncut	2/10

Switzerland is the title of the third album by Detroit rock band Electric Six.

The album consists of thirteen new tracks. The band commented that:

[...] for the first time, none of the songs have the word "dance" or variation of "dance" in the title. But fear not. We have songs with "drugs" and "girls" and "tonight" and "night" and "louder" and "party" in the title, so we haven't given up on our philosophy just yet.

A music video for the song "I Buy the Drugs" was recorded on July 1, 2006 and was released on their MySpace site in early August. A digital download of the track followed on August 15, 2006.

The album was released on September 12, 2006 in the United States and was followed by releases in the United Kingdom, Germany, France, Italy, the Netherlands and Scandinavia.

== Track listing ==
All lyrics written by Tyler Spencer; all music composed by Tyler Spencer except where noted.

1. "The Band in Hell" – 3:19
2. "I Buy the Drugs" – 3:22
3. "Mr. Woman" – 2:52
4. "Night Vision" – 4:03
5. "Infected Girls" (Peters/Shipps) – 3:29
6. "Pulling the Plug on the Party" – 2:54
7. "Rubber Rocket" (Tait) – 3:37
8. "Pink Flamingos" – 2:42
9. "I Wish This Song Was Louder" – 3:14
10. "Slices of You" (John Nash) – 4:17
11. "There's Something Very Wrong With Us, So Let's Go Out Tonight" – 4:23
12. "Germans in Mexico" – 3:01
13. "Chocolate Pope" – 1:02

The Australian release of the album under label Inertia Records contains a fourteenth track, a Midnight Juggernauts remix of "The Future Is in the Future" from the band's album Señor Smoke.

== Music videos ==
Lead singer Dick Valentine stated in an interview that the band intends to record a video for every song on the album, "a lot of them...low budget". Seven official videos were released:

- "I Buy the Drugs" on YouTube
  - Dick Valentine's commentary on the video
- "Chocolate Pope" on YouTube
- "Mr. Woman" on YouTube.
- "Pulling the Plug on the Party" on YouTube
- "There's Something Very Wrong With Us So Let's Go Out Tonight" on YouTube
- "Rubber Rocket" on YouTube.
- "Infected Girls" on YouTube

In addition to the official videos released by the band, Electric Six also hosted a contest for the best fan video for the first single on the album, "I Buy the Drugs." Several winning videos were posted on the band's MySpace page but have since been removed.

== Personnel ==
- Dick Valentine – vocals
- John R. Dequindre – bass, harmonica
- Percussion World – drums, cymbal
- Johnny Na$hinal – lead guitar
- The Colonel – rhythm guitar, background vocals, sitar
- Tait Nucleus? – synthesizer, piano
