= Danger! High Voltage =

2002 single by Electric Six

Single by Electric Six

from the album Fire
- B-side: "I Lost Control (Of My Rock and Roll)"; "Remote Control (Me)"
- Released: December 23, 2002
- Recorded: Early 2000
- Genre: Dance-rock; funk rock
- Length: 3:34
- Label: XL
- Songwriters: Steve Nawara; Tyler Spencer
- Producers: Stuart Bradbury; Damien Mendis

Electric Six singles chronology
"Danger! High Voltage" (2002)	"Gay Bar" (2003)

"Danger! High Voltage" is a song by American rock band Electric Six. It was released as the band's debut single and the lead single from their debut studio album, Fire (2003), in December 2002 by XL Recordings. It peaked at number two on the UK Singles Chart and reached the top 20 in Ireland and the Netherlands. It received positive reviews from critics and was named Single of the Week by the NME.

== Background ==
The song was originally recorded in early 2000, when the band was under the name the Wildbunch. They were forced to drop this name following legal pressure from the Bristol trip hop collective of the same name. The later album and single version were produced by British music producers Damien Mendis and Stuart Bradbury, who also created club mixes under the name of Soulchild.

Fellow Detroit native Jack White of the White Stripes performed the secondary Falsetto lead vocals on the track. Members of the band have claimed in interviews that the singer was an auto mechanic named John S. O'Leary and not White, although music critics suspected this name was a pseudonym for White.

== Critical reception ==
The New York Times called the song "catchier than anything on the radio by the White Stripes." The Guardian called it "insanely catchy", though "the archetypal comic novelty single." Josh Tyrangiel with Time magazine also praised the track. NME's Piers Martin wrote "[Electric Six] rustle up the sort of pop-party thrash which sounds like the idiot half-brother to The Rapture's 'House Of Jealous Lovers'. That good." The song is listed at number 234 on the best songs of the 2000s by Pitchfork Media. It was also featured in The Pitchfork 500. Writing for The Village Voice, Amy Phillips said, "The two men shout declarations of affection to each other over a sizzling Saturday Night Fever groove, and the sax sounds as if it's being played by someone with a long, luscious mullet. The video features taxidermy and a glowing codpiece."

== Music video ==
The video for this song was directed by Tom Kuntz and Mike Maguire. Set inside of a fancy manor house, it shows lead singer Dick Valentine and British actress Tina Kanarek as a wealthy couple, outfitted with a brightly flashing codpiece and bra respectively. The paintings featured in the video were created by artist Brian Rea.

== Track listings ==
US CD single

1. "Danger! High Voltage" (Soulchild radio mix)
2. "I Lost Control (Of My Rock & Roll)"
3. "Remote Control (Me)"
4. "Danger! High Voltage" (Thin White Duke remix by Jacques Lu Cont)

Australian CD single

1. "Danger! High Voltage" (Soulchild radio mix)
2. "I Lost Control (Of My Rock & Roll)"
3. "Remote Control (Me)"
4. "Danger! High Voltage" (Soulchild 12-inch Blitz mix)
5. "Danger! High Voltage" (Kilogram mix)

UK CD1

1. "Danger! High Voltage" (Soulchild radio mix)
2. "I Lost Control (Of My Rock & Roll)"

UK CD2

1. "Danger! High Voltage" (Soulchild 12-inch Blitz mix)
2. "Danger! High Voltage" (Thin White Duke mix)
3. "Danger! High Voltage" (Kilogram remix)

UK 7-inch single

A. "Danger! High Voltage" (original 7-inch mix)
B. "I Lost Control (Of My Rock & Roll)"

== Charts ==
=== Weekly charts ===
Chart (2003)	Peak position
Australia (ARIA)	67
Belgium (Ultratop 50 Flanders)	41
Europe (Eurochart Hot 100)	10
Ireland (IRMA)	15
Netherlands (Dutch Top 40 Tipparade)	15
Netherlands (Single Top 100)	81
Scottish Singles Sales (Official Charts)	1
UK Singles (Official Charts)	2
UK Indie (Official Charts)	1

=== Year-end charts ===
Chart (2003)	Position
UK Singles (OCC)	77

== Certifications ==
Region	Certification	Certified units/sales
United Kingdom (BPI)	Silver	200,000^{‡}
^{‡} Sales+streaming figures based on certification alone.

== Release history ==
Region	Date	Format(s)	Label(s)	Ref(s).
Australia	December 23, 2002	7-inch vinyl; 12-inch vinyl; CD	XL	
United Kingdom	January 6, 2003	12-inch vinyl; CD	XL	
United Kingdom	January 20, 2003	7-inch vinyl	XL	
United States	March 17, 2003	Alternative radio	XL	

== Bibliography ==
- Handyside, Chris (2004). Fell in Love with a Band: The Story of The White Stripes. Location unknown:St. Martin's Griffin
