= Señor Smoke =

Studio album by Electric Six
- Released: February 14, 2005
- Recorded: 2004
- Genres: Alternative rock; funk rock
- Length: 43:02
- Labels: Warner Bros.; Rushmore; Metropolis
- Producer: Peters & Peters

Electric Six chronology
Fire (2003)	Señor Smoke (2005)	Switzerland (2006)

Singles from Señor Smoke
- 1. "Vibrator" Released: October 18, 2004; 2. "Radio Ga Ga" Released: December 13, 2004

Señor Smoke (2005) is the second album from Electric Six, following Fire in 2003. It was released in the UK February 14, 2005 by Warner Music imprint Rushmore Records. Due to complications with Electric Six's former record label, Rushmore did not release the album in North America. In December 2005, the band announced a new partnership with Metropolis Records that resulted in Señor Smoke's North American release on February 7, 2006.

Señor Smoke was ravaged by the UK press upon its 2005 release. However, the response to the album has been much more enthusiastic in America, with several positive reviews, including one from the March 2006 issue of Blender magazine that claims that the album (which received four stars) is so good that "[it] achieves an advance modern medicine has long pursued: it restores virginity."

The album's title honors Aurelio López (1948–1992), a former relief pitcher of the Detroit Tigers whose nickname was Señor Smoke.

Electric Six performed a cover version of Queen's "Radio Ga Ga" on Señor Smoke. Brian May of Queen was reportedly a fan of the Electric Six version.

== Critical reception ==
Professional ratings
Aggregate scores
Source	Rating
Metacritic	58/100
Review scores
Source	Rating
AllMusic	4/5 stars
The A.V. Club	B
DIY	3/5 stars
Drowned in Sound	1/10
Pitchfork	4.4/10
PopMatters	6/10
Q	1/5 stars
Spin	B
Tiny Mix Tapes	1/5 stars
Uncut	6/10

Señor Smoke was met with "mixed or average" reviews from critics. At Metacritic, which assigns a weighted average rating out of 100 to reviews from mainstream publications, this release received an average score of 58, based on 13 reviews.

== Track listing ==
All lyrics are written by Tyler Spencer, except "Radio Ga Ga" by Roger Taylor; all music is composed by Spencer, except where noted.

No.	Title	Music	Length
1.	"Rock and Roll Evacuation"		3:36
2.	"Devil Nights"	Spencer, Zach Shipps, Christopher Tait, Chris Peters	2:56
3.	"Bite Me"	Spencer, Shipps, Tait, Peters	3:57
4.	"Jimmy Carter"		3:27
5.	"Pleasing Interlude I"		0:47
6.	"Dance Epidemic"	Spencer, Shipps, Tait, Peters	2:48
7.	"Future Boys"		3:08
8.	"Dance-A-Thon 2005"	Spencer, Shipps, Tait, Peters	3:29
9.	"Be My Dark Angel"		3:17
10.	"Vibrator"	Spencer, Shipps, Tait, Peters	2:31
11.	"Boy or Girl?"	Spencer, Shipps, Tait, Peters	3:26
12.	"Pleasing Interlude II"		0:27
13.	"Radio Ga Ga" (Queen cover)	Taylor	3:55
14.	"Taxi to Nowhere"		1:39
15.	"Future Is in the Future"	Spencer, Shipps, Tait, Peters	3:37

== Personnel ==
- Dick Valentine – vocals
- Johnny Na$hinal – lead guitar
- The Colonel – rhythm guitar
- Tait Nucleus? – synthesizer
- John R. Dequindre – bass (tracks 1–12, 14–15)
- Frank Lloyd Bonaventure – bass (track 13)
- Matt Aljian – drums (tracks 1–4, 7–9, 12, 15)
- Michael Alonso – drums (tracks 6, 10)
- Johnny Hentch – piano (tracks 1, 14)

== Charts ==
Chart performance for Señor Smoke
Chart (2005)	Peak position
Scottish Albums (Official Charts)	77
