= Grant Smillie =

Australian musician (born 1977)

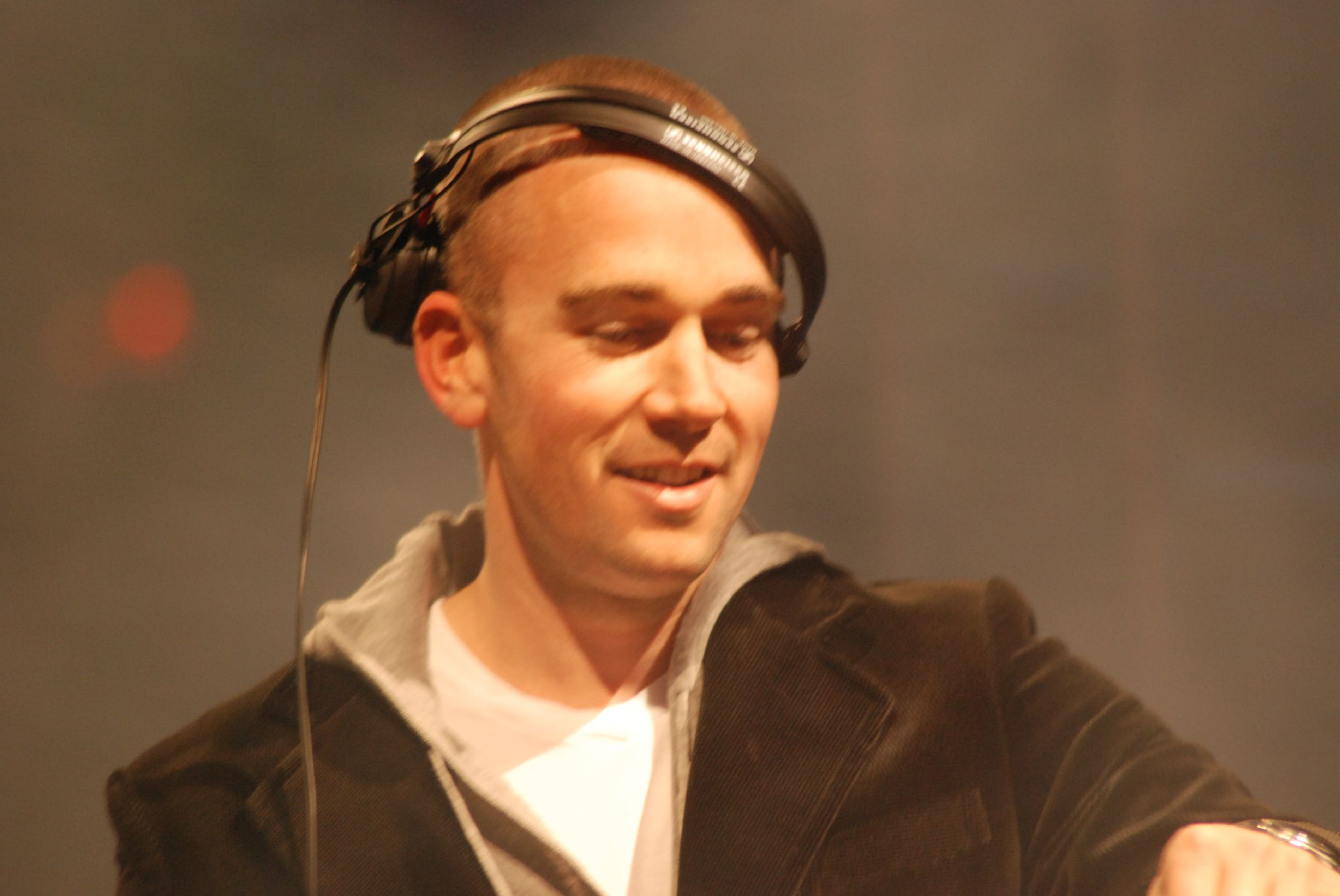
Image of Grant Smillie

Grant Smillie (born 3 May 1977) is an Australian house music producer and DJ from Melbourne.

== Biography ==
Smillie often plays sets in clubs around Australia.

Smillie and Ivan Gough make up the production outfit TV Rock and toured with the Future Music Festival in 2010.
