= Electric Six discography =

- Studio albums: 16
- Soundtrack albums: 1
- Live albums: 4
- Compilation albums: 2
- Singles: 14
- Video albums: 2
- Music videos: 23
- Kickstarter: 4

The Wildbunch discography
- Studio albums: 1
- Live albums: 2
- Singles: 3

This article catalogues the releases of the American band Electric Six.

== Discography as Electric Six ==
=== Official canon studio albums ===
Title	Details	Peak chart positions				Certifications (sales thresholds)
Title	Details	UK	FRA	IRE	US Dance	Certifications (sales thresholds)
Fire	Released: May 20 in US and June 30 in UK, 2003; Label: XL; Formats: CD, LP	7	150	22	5	BPI: Gold
Señor Smoke	Released: February 14, 2005; Label: Warner Bros., Metropolis; Formats: CD	105	—	—	—	
Switzerland	Released: September 12, 2006; Label: Metropolis; Formats: CD, download	—	—	—	—	
I Shall Exterminate Everything Around Me That Restricts Me from Being the Master	Released: October 9, 2007; Label: Metropolis; Formats: CD, download	—	—	—	5	
Flashy	Released: October 20, 2008; Label: Metropolis; Formats: CD, download	—	—	—	14	
Kill	Released: October 19, 2009; Label: Metropolis; Formats: CD, download	—	—	—	20	
Zodiac	Released: September 28, 2010; Label: Metropolis; Formats: CD, download	—	—	—	—	
Heartbeats and Brainwaves	Released: October 11, 2011; Label: Metropolis; Formats: CD, download	—	—	—	—	
Mustang	Released: October 8, 2013; Label: Metropolis; Formats: CD, download	—	—	—	—	
Human Zoo	Released: October 14, 2014; Label: Metropolis; Formats: CD, download	—	—	—	—	
Bitch, Don't Let Me Die!	Released: October 2, 2015; Label: Metropolis; Formats: CD, download	—	—	—	—	
Fresh Blood for Tired Vampyres	Released: October 7, 2016; Label: Metropolis; Formats: CD, download	—	—	—	—	
How Dare You?	Released: October 13, 2017; Label: Metropolis; Formats: CD, download	—	—	—	—	
Bride of the Devil	Released: October 5, 2018; Label: Metropolis; Formats: CD, download	—	—	—	—	
Streets of Gold	Released: July 30, 2021; Label: Cleopatra; Formats: CD, vinyl, download	—	—	—	—	
Turquoise	Released: September 8, 2023; Label: Metropolis; Formats: CD, download	—	—	—	—	

=== Kickstarter campaign and self-released studio albums ===
Title	Details
Mimicry	Released: 2015; Label: Self-released; Formats: CD, download
Roulette Stars of Metro Detroit	Released: 2016; Label: Self-released; Formats: CD, download
You're Welcome!	Released: 2017; Label: Self-released; Formats: CD, download
A Very Electric SiXmas	Released: October 25, 2018; Label: Self-released; Formats: CD, download

=== Soundtrack albums ===
Title	Details
Roulette Stars of Metro Detroit	Released: July 13, 2016; Label: Self-released; Formats: CD, download

=== Live albums ===
Title	Details
Absolute Pleasure	Released: October 9, 2012; Label: Metropolis; Formats: CD, download
You're Welcome! (Live in Oxford)	Released: September 2017; Label: Self-released; Formats: CD, download
Chill Out!	Released: October 2018; Label: Self-released; Formats: CD, download
Live in Liverpool!	Released: October 2019; Label: Self-released; Formats: CD, download

=== Compilations ===
Title	Details
Sexy Trash	Released: October 17, 2008; Label: Self-released; Formats: CD, download
Memories	Released: March 2015; Label: Self-released; Formats: CD, download

=== Singles ===
Single	Year	Peak chart positions							Certifications	Album
Single	Year	AUS	BEL	IRE	NLD	SCO	UK	UK Indie	Certifications	Album
"Danger! High Voltage"	2003	67	41	15	81	1	2	1	BPI: Silver	Fire
"Gay Bar"	2003	—	—	32	—	6	5	2	BPI: Silver	Fire
"Dance Commander"	2003	—	—	—	—	39	40	5		Fire
"Vibrator"	2004	—	—	—	—	—	—	—		Señor Smoke
"Radio Ga Ga"	2004	—	—	44	—	16	21	—		Señor Smoke
"I Buy the Drugs"	2006	—	—	—	—	—	—	—		Switzerland
"Jam it in the Hole"	2010	—	—	—	—	—	—	—		Zodiac
"Interchangeable Knife" (Dubai Bros. Remix)"	2011	—	—	—	—	—	—	—		Heartbeats and Brainwaves
"Eye in the Sky"	2020	—	—	—	—	—	—	—		Non-album single
"Danger! High Voltage (Re-Recorded)"	2021	—	—	—	—	—	—	—		Streets of Gold
"Gay Bar (Re-Recorded)"	2021	—	—	—	—	—	—	—		Streets of Gold
"Yah Mo B There"	2021	—	—	—	—	—	—	—		Streets of Gold
"Take Me to the Sugar"	2021	—	—	—	—	—	—	—		Turquoise
"—" denotes a recording that did not chart or was not released in that territory.

=== Music videos ===
Year	Title	Director	Notes
2002	"Danger! High Voltage"	Tom Kuntz & Mike Maguire	Released to promote "Danger! High Voltage!" and Fire
2003	"Gay Bar"	Tom Kuntz & Mike Maguire	Released to promote "Gay Bar" and Fire
2003	"Dance Commander"	Ruben Fleischer	Released to promote "Dance Commander" and Fire
2005	"Radio Ga Ga"	Tom Kuntz & Mike Maguire	Released to promote Señor Smoke
2006	"I Buy the Drugs"	Anthony Ernst Garth	Released to promote Switzerland and part of Electric Six's project to create a music video for every song on the album
2006	"Mr. Woman"	Kris Kaczor	Released to promote Switzerland and part of Electric Six's project to create a music video for every song on the album
2006	"There's Something Very Wrong with Us, So Let's Go Out Tonight"	Justin Lowe	Released to promote Switzerland and part of Electric Six's project to create a music video for every song on the album
2006	"Rubber Rocket"		Released to promote Switzerland and part of Electric Six's project to create a music video for every song on the album
2006	"Chocolate Pope"		Released to promote Switzerland and part of Electric Six's project to create a music video for every song on the album
2007	"Infected Girls"	Digitelio	Released to promote Switzerland and part of Electric Six's project to create a music video for every song on the album
2007	"Down at McDonnelzzz"	Zac Holman	Released to promote I Shall Exterminate Everything Around Me That Restricts Me from Being the Master
2007	"It's Showtime!"		Released to promote I Shall Exterminate Everything Around Me That Restricts Me from Being the Master
2007	"Randy's Hot Tonight!"		Released to promote I Shall Exterminate Everything Around Me That Restricts Me from Being the Master
2008	"Pulling the Plug on the Party"		Released to promote Switzerland and part of Electric Six's project to create a music video for every song on the album
2008	"Formula 409"	Anthony Ernst Garth	Released to promote Flashy
2008	"Making Progress"		Released to promote Flashy
2009	"Body Shot"	Nabil Elderkin	Released to promote Kill
2011	"You're a Mean One, Mr. Grinch"		A live-performance video produced as part of the "Holiday Undercover" series for The A.V. Club.
2012	"Psychic Visions"	Justin Lowe	Given that it was the band's first music video in 3 years and that it was released a year after the release of Heartbeats and Brainwaves, it is likely that this video represented a creative project that the band wished to undertake as opposed to a means of promoting the album.
2017	"I'll Be in Touch"	Dillon Vaughn	Produced as part of a stretch goal for Electric Six's You're Welcome! Kickstarter campaign.
2017	"I Got the Box"	Andre Bennet	Produced as part of a stretch goal for Electric Six's You're Welcome! Kickstarter campaign.
2020	"Panic! Panic!"		Music video produced for the band's demo version of "Panic! Panic!" shot and released during the Coronavirus pandemic.
2021	"Ya Mo B There"		Music video produced to promote the release of the single and the release of the corresponding album Streets of Gold.
2022	"Nuclear War (On the Dancefloor)"		An official upload to the band's YouTube channel featuring Tait Nucleus and stock footage produced during the COVID pandemic.

=== Films ===
Year	Title	Director	Actors	Writer	Producers	Notes
2014	Absolute Treasure	John Anderson	Dick Valentine, Tait Nucleus?, Johnny Na$hinal, Percussion World, Smörgåsbord, Da Ve	Tyler Spencer	Mel Caceres, Phil Crossland, Pat Divis, Sharon Iles, Peter Schofield & Niles Stanbery	A concert film of the band's performance at St. Andrews Hall in Detroit, Michigan on September 7, 2013.
2016	Roulette Stars of Metro Detroit	Tom Lehrer & Tom Nahas	Dick Valentine, Tait Nucleus?, Johnny Na$hinal, Percussion World & Da Ve	Tyler Spencer	Chris Fuller	A mockumentary film starring members of the band as fictional versions of themselves.
2018	Chill Out: Electric Six Unplugged			Tyler Spencer	Chris Fuller	A live broadcast of the gig performed for the band's Chill Out! live album.
2019	Electric Six: Live in Liverpool!	Tom Lehrer & Tom Nahas		Tyler Spencer	Chris Fuller	Concert film of the band's performance in Liverpool, UK in May 2019 shot and released as part of a Kickstarter campaign.
2020	Electric Six: Live from Quarantine	Tom Lehrer & Tom Nahas		Tyler Spencer	Chris Fuller	A live-streamed concert film showcasing the band's first socially-distant gig during the 2020 Coronavirus pandemic.
2020	Electric Six: Halloween Spooktacular	Tom Lehrer & Tom Nahas		Tyler Spencer	Chris Fuller	A Halloween-themed live-streamed concert film of the band performing a socially-distant show during the Coronavirus pandemic.
2020	It's the Most Wonderful Time... of the Least Wonderful Year	Tom Lehrer & Tom Nahas		Tyler Spencer	Chris Fuller	A Christmas-themed live-streamed concert film of the band performing a socially-distant show during the Coronavirus pandemic.
2021	Electric Six: Mood Is Improving	Tom Lehrer & Tom Nahas		Tyler Spencer	Chris Fuller	A live-streamed concert film of the band performing a socially-distant show during the Coronavirus pandemic with the theme of optimism surrounding the pandemic soon being over.

=== Splits ===
- Rockshow (7" split with Peaches)

=== Kickstarter commissions ===
The band routinely offer the option for backers of their frequent Kickstarter campaigns to commission them to record an original song or cover version of a song by another artist. Although these are usually only made available to the backer, many have been made available online by their backer, leaked online or subsequently included on releases by the band.

Year	Title	Original artist	Related Kickstarter campaign	Release status
2014	"Gary's in the Park"	Gary Wilson	Absolute Treasure	Made available online by backer
2014	"Maneater"	Hall & Oates	Absolute Treasure	Made available online by backer
2014	"2112 Overture/The Temples of Syrinx"	Rush	Absolute Treasure	Made available online by backer
2014	"Pokémon Theme"	Jason Paige	Absolute Treasure	Leaked online
2014	"Rock DJ"	Robbie Williams	Absolute Treasure	Leaked online
2014	"She Drives Me Crazy"	Fine Young Cannibals	Absolute Treasure	Made available online by backer
2014	Unknown cover	Unknown	Absolute Treasure	Still unreleased
2014	"Ziggy"	Electric Six	Absolute Treasure	Subsequently, included on Mimicry and Memories
2014	Unknown original song	Electric Six	Absolute Treasure	Still unreleased
2015	"Turn Me Loose"	Loverboy	Mimicry and Memories	Released on Mimicry and Memories
2015	"Rockets"		Mimicry and Memories	Released on Mimicry and Memories
2015	"Stuck in a Closet with Vanna White"	"Weird Al" Yankovic	Mimicry and Memories	Released on Mimicry and Memories
2015	"Cat People"	David Bowie	Mimicry and Memories	Released on Mimicry and Memories
2015	"The Caveman Diet"	Electric Six	Mimicry and Memories	Made available online by backer
2016	"All Night Long"	Rainbow	Roulette Stars of Metro Detroit	Released on Roulette Stars of Metro Detroit soundtrack album
2016	"Obsession"	Animotion|	Roulette Stars of Metro Detroit	Released on Roulette Stars of Metro Detroit soundtrack album
2016	"When the Lights Go Out"	Oingo Boingo	Roulette Stars of Metro Detroit	Released on Roulette Stars of Metro Detroit soundtrack album
2017	"Rasputin"	Boney M.	You're Welcome!	Released on You're Welcome!
2017	"Magic Dance"		You're Welcome!	Released on You're Welcome!
2017	"Seminole Bingo"	Warren Zevon	You're Welcome!	Released on You're Welcome!
2017	"Last Night I Had a Dream"	Randy Newman	You're Welcome!	Released on You're Welcome!
2017	"Vow"	Garbage	You're Welcome!	Released on You're Welcome!
2017	"Nightclubbing"	Iggy Pop	You're Welcome!	Released on You're Welcome!
2017	"Young Americans"		You're Welcome!	Released on You're Welcome!
2017	"A Song About Skeletons"	Electric Six	You're Welcome!	Made available on Dick Valentine's Patreon
2017	Unknown		You're Welcome!	Made available on Dick Valentine's Patreon
2017	Unknown		You're Welcome!	Made available on Dick Valentine's Patreon
2018–2019	"Christmas Wrapping"	The Waitresses	A Very Electric SiXmas and Chill Out!	Included on A Very Electric SiXmas
2018–2019	"Same Old Lang Syne"	Dan Fogelberg	A Very Electric SiXmas and Chill Out!	Included on A Very Electric SiXmas
2018–2019	"Christmas at K-Mart"	Root Boy Slim	A Very Electric SiXmas and Chill Out!	Included on A Very Electric SiXmas
2018–2019	"Don't Shoot Me Santa"	The Killers	A Very Electric SiXmas and Chill Out!	Included on A Very Electric SiXmas
2018–2019	"Christmas Vacation"	Mavis Staples	A Very Electric SiXmas and Chill Out!	Included on A Very Electric SiXmas
2018–2019	"The Night Santa Went Crazy"	"Weird Al" Yankovic	A Very Electric SiXmas and Chill Out!	Included on A Very Electric SiXmas
2018–2019	"Cold Blooded Christmas"	Jon Lajoie	A Very Electric SiXmas and Chill Out!	Included on A Very Electric SiXmas
2018–2019	"Santa Claus Is Watchin' You"	Ray Stevens	A Very Electric SiXmas and Chill Out!	Included on A Very Electric SiXmas
2018–2019	"Ghost of Christmas Past"		A Very Electric SiXmas and Chill Out!	Included on A Very Electric SiXmas
2018–2019	"Dead Puppies"	Ogden Edsl	A Very Electric SiXmas and Chill Out!	Included in the band's 2019 subscription club package
2018–2019	"Goodbye Horses"	Q Lazzarus	A Very Electric SiXmas and Chill Out!	Included in the band's 2019 subscription club package
2018–2019	"Heart-Shaped Box"	Nirvana	A Very Electric SiXmas and Chill Out!	Included in the band's 2019 subscription club package
2018–2019	"Ride Like the Wind"	Christopher Cross	A Very Electric SiXmas and Chill Out!	Included in the band's 2019 subscription club package
2018–2019	"The Safety Dance"	Men Without Hats	A Very Electric SiXmas and Chill Out!	Included in the band's 2019 subscription club package
2018–2019	"Smoke from a Distant Fire"	Sanford Townsend Band	A Very Electric SiXmas and Chill Out!	Included in the band's 2019 subscription club package
2018–2019	"Soul Pressure"	Mark Mallman	A Very Electric SiXmas and Chill Out!	Included in the band's 2019 subscription club package
2018–2019	"Twilight Zone"	Golden Earring	A Very Electric SiXmas and Chill Out!	Included in the band's 2019 subscription club package
2018–2019	"Un-Reborn Again"	Queens of the Stone Age	A Very Electric SiXmas and Chill Out!	Included in the band's 2019 subscription club package
2018–2019	"We All March On"	Scott Buckley-Hewitt	A Very Electric SiXmas and Chill Out!	Included in the band's 2019 subscription club package
2018–2019	"You Little Fool"		A Very Electric SiXmas and Chill Out!	Included in the band's 2019 subscription club package
2018–2019	Unknown	Electric Six	A Very Electric SiXmas and Chill Out!	Unreleased
2018–2019	Unknown		A Very Electric SiXmas and Chill Out!	Unreleased

== Discography as The Wildbunch ==
=== Albums ===
- An Evening with the Many Moods of the Wildbunch's Greatest Hits... Tonight! (8-track) (Uchu Cult) (1996)
- Don't Be Afraid of the Robot: Live at the Gold Dollar (CD) (Off Woodward Productions, GD-101) (1998-07-25)
1. "Nuclear War (On the Dance Floor)"
2. "Speak English"
3. "Naked Pictures"
4. "The Model"
5. "Computer"
6. "The Ballade of MC Sucka DJ"
7. "Clones (We're All)"
8. "Immolate Me"
9. "Taxi to Nowhere"
10. "Don't Be Afraid of the Robot"
11. "Breaking Up"
12. "I'm on Acid"
13. "R U Afraid of the Devil?"
14. "Meat the Band"
15. "I Am the Knife"
16. "I Am Detroit"
17. "I Lost Control"
18. "Freshman"
19. "I'm a Demon"
20. "Tiny Little Men"
21. "Take Off Your Clothes"
22. "Gay Bar"
23. "I Know Karate"
- Rock Empire (CD) (Uchu Cult) (1999-07-??)
1. "Don't Be Afraid of the Robot"
2. "Remote Control (Me)"
3. "Gay Bar"
4. "TV"
5. "Getting Into the Jam"
6. "Take Me to Your Leader"
7. "Animal Attraction"
8. "Dancing Like an Idiot"
9. "Synthesizer"
10. "I Am the Knife"
11. "Naked Pictures (Of Your Mother)"
12. "R U Afraid of the Devil?"
13. "I'm on Acid"
14. "Computer"
15. "Christian Radio Manchester"
16. "I Am Detroit"
17. "Honolulu"
18. "I'm a Demon"
19. "Gay Bar (Remix)"
20. "Persona vs. Wildbunch"

=== Singles ===
- "I Lost Control (Of My Rock'n' Roll)" (7") (Uchu Cult, SC 001) (1996)

500 copies

1. "I Lost Control (Of My Rock and Roll)"
2. "Tiny Little Men"
3. "Gay Bar"
4. "I Know Karate"
- "The Ballade of MC Sucka DJ" (7") (Flying Bomb Records, FLB-105) (1997)
1. "Take Off Your Clothes"
2. "Nuclear War (On the Dancefloor)"
3. "The Ballade of MC Sucka DJ"
- "Danger! High Voltage" (7") (Flying Bomb Records, FLB-117) (2001)

Recorded by Jim Diamond

1. "Danger (High Voltage)"
2. "Neurocameraman"
3. "She's Guatemala"

=== Compilations ===
- "X-Mas Surprise Package" (7") (Flying Bomb Records, FLB-106) (1997)

"X-Mas Xorcismus (Ho Ho Ho)"

Clear green or black vinyl

- Troy Gregory's Sybil (CD) (Fall of Rome Records, FOR 1005) (2002)

"Dealin' in Death N' Stealin' in the Name of the Lord"

Recorded by Jim Diamond
