= Roulette Stars of Metro Detroit =

- Directed by: Tom Lehrer Tom Nahas
- Written by: Tyler Spencer; Tom Lehrer; Tom Nahas
- Produced by: Chris Fuller
- Starring: Dick Valentine; Dave Malarsh; Mike Alonso; Christopher Tait; John Nash
- Cinematography: Tom Lehrer
- Edited by: Tom Nahas
- Music by: Electric Six
- Production company: Mad Habit Creative
- Release date: July 14, 2016 (home media)
- Running time: 85 minutes
- Country: United States
- Language: English
- Budget: $63,243

Roulette Stars of Metro Detroit is an American mockumentary film starring members of the rock band Electric Six as fictional versions of themselves. The film was written by lead singer Dick Valentine and was crowd-sourced through a Kickstarter campaign.

== Cast ==
- Dick Valentine as Himself
- Da Ve as Himself
- Johnny Na$hinal as Himself
- Tait Nucleus? as Himself
- Mike Alonso as Himself

== Production ==
The project was originally pitched on Kickstarter as a spoof 45-minute pilot for a documentary TV series following fictionalised backstories and exploits of the members of the band.

A $30,000 goal was set which was soon reached and surpassed. A total of $63,243 was raised by the end of the campaign.

The mockumentary features cameos from some backers of the project on Kickstarter who pledged to be given a role in the film.

During the edit, it was decided to alter production and produce a feature-film mockumentary with the footage instead. The finished product runs for 85 minutes.

The project was distributed to its backers on the 14th of July 2016. A public screening was held at the Main Art Theatre in Detroit on the 8th of September 2016 and it was subsequently accepted into the Royal Starr Film Festival and screened publicly on the 15th of October 2016.

As with previous Kickstarter campaigns run by the band, the option was given to pledge money in exchange for choosing a song that the band would cover to potentially appear in the film and to feature on the soundtrack. None of these made their way into the final cut but are all present on the soundtrack.

== Soundtrack album ==
The film's soundtrack album was released on CD and digital download to the project's Kickstarter pledgers. It is the band's thirteenth studio album, comprising four original songs, three covers and two remixes of the band's songs.

Roulette Stars of Metro Detroit

Soundtrack album by Electric Six
- Released: July 14, 2016
- Genre: Rock
- Label: self-released
- Producer: John Nash

Electric Six chronology
| Bitch, Don't Let Me Die! (2015) | Roulette Stars of Metro Detroit (2016) | Fresh Blood for Tired Vampyres (2016) |

Soundtrack
| No. | Title | Writer(s) | Length |
|---|---|---|---|
| 1. | "Compensation" | John Nash and Tyler Spencer | 2:08 |
| 2. | "All Night Long" (Originally recorded by Rainbow) | Ritchie Blackmore and Roger Glover | 3:56 |
| 3. | "An Omen of Things to Come" | John Nash, Tyler Spencer and Christopher Tait | 3:42 |
| 4. | "Obsession" (Originally recorded by Animotion) | Holly Knight and Michael Des Barres | 4:30 |
| 5. | "Night Vision Dubai Bros. Remix" (Dubai Bros. remix of "Night Vision" from Switzerland) | Tyler Spencer | 3:38 |
| 6. | "I Upgraded To You" | John Nash, Tyler Spencer and Christopher Tait | 3:32 |
| 7. | "Shrink the Bastards" | Tyler Spencer | 2:04 |
| 8. | "Lottery Reptiles Tropicalia Mix" (Remix of the song "Lottery Reptiles" from Fresh Blood for Tired Vampyres) | John Nash and Tyler Spencer | 3:23 |
| 9. | "When the Lights Go Out" (Originally recorded by Oingo Boingo) | Danny Elfman | 3:42 |

The covers and remixes do not appear in the film despite being present on the album. Conversely, the film makes use of the songs "Dance Commander", "Night Vision", "Infected Girls", "Down at McDonnelzzz", "Gay Bar Part Two", "Eye Contact", "I'm the Devil", "Kids Are Evil", "Roulette!" and "Dime, Dime, Penny Dime" from previous Electric Six albums with none of them appearing on the soundtrack.

== Personnel ==
- Dick Valentine - vocals
- Tait Nucleus? - synthesizer (tracks 3, 6, 7), guitar (track 3), drum programming (track 6)
- Johnny Na$hinal - guitar, background vocals (tracks 1–3), keyboards (tracks 1–2, 4, 9), bass (tracks 2–3, 6–8), drum programming (tracks 4, 8–9), drums (tracks 8–9)
- Percussion World - drums (tracks 2–3, 6)
- Da Ve - guitar (track 3)
- Scott Weinert - bass (track 1)
- Steven Powell - cajón (track 1)
- Melody Malosh - background vocals (track 3)
- Nicole Tausney - background vocals (track 3)
- Coaimhe Carton - vocals (track 4)

== Dick Valentine Raw Collection ==
One of the rewards offered as part of the project's Kickstarter campaign was the Dick Valentine Raw Collection, a compilation album of demos and other pieces produced by Electric Six frontman Dick Valentine.

Raw Collection

Compilation album by Dick Valentine
- Released: July 14, 2016
- Genre: Rock
- Label: Self-released
- Producer: Dick Valentine

Dick Valentine chronology
| Roulette Stars of Metro Detroit (2016) | Raw Collection (2016) | Robocalls (2017) |

All tracks written by Tyler Spencer.

Raw Collection
| No. | Title | Length |
|---|---|---|
| 1. | "Classon Ave. Robots" (Demo of the track featured on Covered in Gas) |
| 2. | "Digital Jackass" |
| 3. | "Hello! I See You" (Demo of the track featured on Heartbeats and Brainwaves) |
| 4. | "I Belong In a Factory" (Demo of the track featured on Kill) |
| 5. | "I Can Translate" (Demo of the track featured on the deluxe edition of Zodiac) |
| 6. | "I'm Not Scared of Flying Saucers" (Demo of the track featured on Covered in Gas) |
| 7. | "Laughing Gas" |
| 8. | "Making Progress" (Demo of the track featured on Flashy) |
| 9. | "Miami" |
| 10. | "Rubbing Me the Wrong Way" (Demo of the track featured on Kill) |
| 11. | "Suitcases" (Demo of the track featured on Mimicry and Memories) |
| 12. | "Synth 2" |
| 13. | "Theme From Garage Band (Test 1)" |
| 14. | "Tonight Should Have Never Been Tonight (Test 3)" |
| 15. | "Waste of Time and Money" (Demo of the track featured on Kill) |
| 16. | "Zora and Nora" (Demo of the track featured on Covered in Gas) |
