= Dancer in the Dark (disambiguation) =

Dancer in the Dark is a 2000 film by Lars von Trier, featuring Björk.

Dancer in the Dark may also refer to:

- "Dancer in the Dark" (short story), a 2004 science fiction story by David Gerrold
- "Dancer in the Dark", a 2003 song by For My Pain... from the album Fallen
- "Dancer in the Dark", a 2005 song by The Rasmus from their album Hide from the Sun

== See also ==
- Dancing in the Dark (disambiguation)
