= Baracksdubs =

YouTube channel

- Channel logo

YouTube information
- Channel: baracksdubs
- Years active: 2012–2019
- Genre: Comedy
- Subscribers: 1.48 million
- Views: 309.7 million
- Last updated: October 5, 2024

Baracksdubs is a popular YouTube channel and series that uses Barack Obama speeches to create cover songs, generally of popular songs. The channel was created by Fadi Saleh as a then-freshman student of the University of Tennessee. Saleh formed his own company, Spare Time Entertainment in 2015.

== History ==
Fadi Saleh started the channel when he was a 19 year old freshman and biochemistry major at the University of Tennessee. He told the Daily Dot he came up with idea of having Barack Obama sing songs while in the shower in December 2011. His first video, which had Obama singing "Drink to That" by Rihanna, was posted the following January.

Saleh didn't immediately advertise his involvement in the channel, in spite of the videos'popularity. It wasn't until his video, "Born This Way", went viral that he shared the news with friends. By July 2012, the YouTube channel had 127,000 subscribers and an online merchandise store. Each video took approximately three weeks to create and would sometimes include superimposing the president's face on the artist's body to create the effect of him dancing. Videos would sometimes feature other famous figures.

In September 2015, Saleh announced his new company, Spare Time Entertainment, with the intent of turning his hobby into an online entertainment brand. By this time, the YouTube channel had amassed over 900,000 subscribers. The September 1st announcement was followed by a relaunch of Baracksdubs the following week. Saleh had incorporated proprietary technology that reduced video editing time from approximately 100 hours to a single day by searching for specific words in source material.

In February 2017, following Donald Trump's inauguration, Baracksdubs released a video of Obama singing Kendrick Lamar's "Alright", whose lyrics had been used as a protest chant against the new president.

== Episodes ==
Song	Artist	Released	Ref
"Drink To That"	Rihanna	January 4, 2012	
"Born This Way"	Lady Gaga	January 10, 2012	
"Sexy and I Know It"	LMFAO	March 26, 2012	
"Call Me Maybe"	Carly Rae Jepsen	June 4, 2012	
"Boyfriend"	Justin Bieber	June 24, 2012	
"What Makes You Beautiful"	One Direction	July 20, 2012	
"Hot n Cold" (sung by both Obama and Mitt Romney)	Katy Perry	October 15, 2012	
"U Can't Touch This"	MC Hammer	November 6, 2012	
"Deck The Halls"	Traditional	December 19, 2012	
'SexyBack"	Justin Timberlake	January 21, 2013	
"Pokémon Theme"	Jason Paige	February 4, 2013	
"Get Lucky"	Daft Punk	June 24, 2013	
"All Gold Everything"	Trinidad James	July 15, 2013	
"Blurred Lines" (sung only by Bill Clinton)	Robin Thicke	July 23, 2013	
"Made in the USA"	Demi Lovato	August 13, 2013	
"Best Song Ever" (sung only by co-anchors on the Today Show)	One Direction	August 23, 2013	
"It's All Good" (sung by both Obama and his wife Michelle)	Ne-Yo	October 9, 2013	
"Jingle Bells"	Traditional	December 9, 2013	
"Do What U Want"	Lady Gaga	January 9, 2014	
"Timber" (sung by both Obama and Hillary Clinton)	Pitbull	April 15, 2014	
"Birthday" (sung only by Ellen DeGeneres)	Katy Perry	June 10, 2014	
"Fancy"	Iggy Azalea	August 5, 2014	
"Problem"	Ariana Grande	August 19, 2014	
"Uptown Funk"	Mark Ronson feat. Bruno Mars	January 27, 2015	
"Shake it Off"	Taylor Swift	February 9, 2015	
"Anaconda" (sung only by the characters of SpongeBob SquarePants)	Nicki Minaj	May 18, 2015	
"Can't Feel My Face"	The Weeknd	September 7, 2015	
"Thriller"	Michael Jackson	October 28, 2015	
"Hotline Bling"	Drake	December 14, 2015	
"Jumpman"	Drake	January 5, 2016	
"Sorry"	Justin Bieber	January 25, 2016	
"Panda"	Desiigner	April 26, 2016	
"No"	Meghan Trainor	May 3, 2016	
"All I Do Is Win" (sung only by Donald Trump)	DJ Khaled	May 23, 2016	
"Work"	Rihanna	May 30, 2016	
"Power" (sung only by Bernie Sanders)	Kanye West	June 6, 2016	
"One Dance"	Drake	June 27, 2016	
"FDT"	YG	July 26, 2016	
"Cut It"	O.T. Genasis	August 9, 2016	
"Can't Stop the Feeling!"	Justin Timberlake	September 3, 2016	
"Stressed Out"	Twenty One Pilots	November 30, 2016	
"All I Want for Christmas Is You"	Mariah Carey	December 22, 2016	
"Let Me Love You"	DJ Snake	December 26, 2016	
"Starboy"	The Weeknd	January 11, 2017	
"Alright"	Kendrick Lamar	January 17, 2017	
"Happy Birthday to You"	Traditional	January 23, 2017	
"Missing you"	Erik Hassle	January 30, 2017	
"Respect"	Aretha Franklin	August 18, 2018	
"Money" (sung only by Bernie Sanders)	Cardi B	August 21, 2019	
"Woah"	Krypto9095	November 27, 2019	

== Media coverage ==
The videos have been featured on Huffington Post, Gawker, Rolling Stone, Yahoo!, Mashable, and several other online news publications. Following Barack Obama's reelection in 2012, Today announced Baracksdubs first post-election video of U Can't Touch This by MC Hammer.

== Reception ==
The video for "Uptown Funk" was called "cleverly edited" by ABC7 New York and Hello!. HuffPost UK called the video of Obama singing Michael Jackson's Thriller "The best thing you'll see today." The video for "Fuck Donald Trump" by YG and Nipsey Hussle, released in July 2016, but went viral on Facebook in November, the week of the 2016 Presidential Election, reaching 26 million views by the end of the week. The International Business Times reported a mix of comments on the video "Fancy", including one that said, "The worst song in history by the worst artist in history, dubbed by the worst US President in history. Suck it down, people. Suck it down" and another that said, "Hilarious !! Better than Iggy".

The videos have been shared on social media by the artists whose songs were used, including LMFAO and Justin Bieber. Iggy Azalea shared the video made of her song "Fancy" to her followers on Twitter. "Uptown Funk" producer, Mark Ronson, shared the video on Twitter with the message, "Bless you for this, @barcksdubs," according to Hello! Magazine.
