= Arrive Alive (disambiguation) =

Arrive Alive is a 1991 unfinished comedy film.

Arrive Alive may also refer to:

- "Arrive Alive" a 2021 episode of TV series Batwoman season 2
- Arrive alive, a 1981 album by Pallas
- "Arrive Alive", a song by Electric Six from the 2017 album How Dare You?
- "Arrive Alive", a song by Before Braille from the 2002 album The Rumor
- "ARRIVE ALIVE! Keep looking and listening while you cross", a step in the Green Cross Code

== See also ==
- NRL Schoolboy Cup, a schools rugby league competition in Australia, formerly known as the Arrive Alive Cup
