= It's Your Night =

Studio album by James Ingram
- Released: October 24, 1983
- Recorded: 1982–1983
- Studio: Westlake (Los Angeles); Ocean Way (Los Angeles)
- Genre: R&B, disco, funk, soul
- Length: 41:19
- Label: Qwest; Warner Bros.
- Producer: Quincy Jones

James Ingram chronology
| It's Your Night (1983) | Never Felt So Good (1986) |

Professional ratings
Review scores
| Source | Rating |
|---|---|
| AllMusic | 3/5 stars |
| Rolling Stone | 2/5 stars |

It's Your Night is the debut album by American singer-songwriter James Ingram, released by Qwest Records/Warner Records on October 24, 1983. The album was commercially successful, as it peaked at number 46 on the Billboard 200 album chart and reached number 10 on the Top R&B/Hip Hop Albums chart. It was later certified gold by the Recording Industry Association of America (RIAA) in early 1984, making this his highest-charting album and only RIAA-certified album.

The aforementioned album and its parent singles were nominated for quadruple Grammy Awards for both 1984 and 1985, with "Yah Mo B There", a duet with singer Michael McDonald, winning for Best R&B Performance by a Duo or Group.

It was his first on Qwest Records, which was run by Quincy Jones.

== Track listing ==
All tracks are produced by Quincy Jones.

Side A
| No. | Title | Writer(s) | Length |
|---|---|---|---|
| 1. | "Party Animal" | James Ingram; Richard Page; Mark Vieha | 4:55 |
| 2. | "Yah Mo B There" | Ingram; Quincy Jones; Michael McDonald; Rod Temperton | 4:40 |
| 3. | "She Loves Me (The Best That I Can Be)" | Jim Photoglo; Brian Francis Neary | 3:40 |
| 4. | "Try Your Love Again" | Glen Ballard; Brock Walsh | 4:25 |

Side B
| No. | Title | Writer(s) | Length |
|---|---|---|---|
| 5. | "Whatever We Imagine" | David Foster; Paul Gordon; Jeremy Lubbock | 3:58 |
| 6. | "One More Rhythm" | Temperton | 4:05 |
| 7. | "There's No Easy Way" | Barry Mann | 3:51 |
| 8. | "It's Your Night" | Ingram; Mann; Cynthia Weil | 3:37 |
| 9. | "How Do You Keep the Music Playing?" | Alan and Marilyn Bergman; Michel Legrand | 4:16 |

== Personnel ==
- James Ingram – lead vocals (1, 3–8), synthesizers (1, 2, 8), synth bass (1), vocals (2, 9), keyboards (8), backing vocals (8)
- Michael Boddicker – synthesizers (1–3, 8)
- Greg Phillinganes – keyboards (1, 4), synthesizers (1, 4, 6), acoustic piano (6)
- Mark Vieha – synthesizers (1)
- Craig Hundley – synthesizer programming (1, 4–6), synthesizers (4)
- Michael McDonald – synthesizers (2), vocals (2)
- Rod Temperton – synthesizers (2, 6)
- Quincy Jones – African voices (2), electric piano (3)
- Robbie Buchanan – keyboards (3), synthesizers (3, 8)
- Don Dorsey – synthesizers (3)
- David Paich – synthesizers (3, 7, 9)
- David Foster – keyboards (5), synthesizers (5), acoustic piano (9)
- Ian Underwood – synthesizer programming (5, 6)
- Jimmy Smith – organ (6), synthesizers (6)
- Steve Porcaro – synthesizer programming (7, 9)
- Paul Jackson Jr. – guitars (1, 4, 8, 9)
- Larry Carlton – guitars (3)
- George Doering – guitars (9)
- Louis Johnson – bass (1, 8)
- Abe Laboriel – bass (7)
- Nathan East – bass (9)
- Harvey Mason – drums (1)
- John Robinson – drums (2, 4, 5, 7, 8)
- Raymond Calhoun – drums (3)
- Leon "Ndugu" Chancler – drums (9)
- Paulinho da Costa – percussion (2, 4, 5, 8)
- Steve Ray – fingerpopper (6, 8)
- Ernie Watts – tenor sax solo (4)
- Larry Williams – saxophones (4, 6)
- Tom Scott – Lyricon (5), saxophones (6), Lyricon solo (8)
- Bill Reichenbach Jr. – trombone (4, 6), bass trombone (4)
- Gary Grant – trumpet (4, 6), flugelhorn (4)
- Jerry Hey – trumpet (4, 6), flugelhorn (4)
- Ollie E. Brown – backing vocals (1)
- Zane Giles – backing vocals (1)
- Jim Gilstrap – backing vocals (1)
- Susaye Greene Brown – backing vocals (1)
- Howard Hewett – backing vocals (1, 6)
- Bunny Hull – backing vocals (1, 8)
- Phillip Ingram – backing vocals (1)
- Augie Johnson – backing vocals (1)
- Valerie Johnson – backing vocals (1)
- Scherrie Payne – backing vocals (1)
- Luther Vandross – backing vocals (1)
- Tom Bahler – backing vocals (6)
- Linda Harmon – backing vocals (6)
- Edie Lehmann – backing vocals (6)
- Paulette McWilliams – backing vocals (8)
- Carmen Twillie – backing vocals (8)
- Maxine Willard Waters – backing vocals (8)
- Patti Austin – vocals (9)

Music arrangements

- James Ingram – arrangements (1, 2, 8)
- Quincy Jones – arrangements (1–4, 7–9)
- Mark Vieha – arrangements (1)
- Michael McDonald – arrangements (2)
- Rod Temperton – arrangements (2, 6, 8)
- Robbie Buchanan – arrangements (3)
- Glen Ballard – arrangements (4)
- Jerry Hey – arrangements (4–6, 8)
- David Foster – arrangements (5, 9)
- David Paich – arrangements (7)
- Barry Mann – arrangements (8)
- Johnny Mandel – arrangements (9)

== Production ==
- Quincy Jones – producer, sleeve notes
- Johnny Mandel – co-producer (9)
- Bruce Swedien – mixing, recording (1–8)
- Joel Moss – recording (9)
- Matt Forger – additional recording, technical director
- Steve Bates – assistant engineer
- Ric Butz – assistant engineer
- Mark Ettel – assistant engineer
- Greg Laney – assistant engineer
- Bernie Grundman – mastering at A&M Studios (Hollywood, California)
- Steve Ray – production assistant
- Mark Ross – production assistant
- Simon Levy – art direction
- Jeri McManus – art direction, design
- Matthew Rolston – photography
- James Ingram – sleeve notes

== Popular culture ==
The song "Whatever We Imagine" was used as the closing theme for both 1984 NCAA Division I men's basketball tournament and 1986 NBA Finals for CBS Sports.

== Charts ==
=== Weekly charts ===
| Chart (1983–1984) | Peak position |
|---|---|
| Dutch Albums (Album Top 100) | 27 |
| Swedish Albums (Sverigetopplistan) | 30 |
| UK Albums (OCC) | 25 |
| US Billboard 200 | 46 |
| US Top R&B/Hip-Hop Albums (Billboard) | 10 |
| Chart (1987) | Peak position |
| Australian Albums (ARIA) | 99 |

=== Year-end charts ===
| Chart (1984) | Position |
|---|---|
| US Top R&B/Hip-Hop Albums (Billboard) | 16 |

== Certifications ==
| Region | Certification | Certified units/sales |
|---|---|---|
| United States (RIAA) | Gold | 500,000^{^} |
^{^} Shipments figures based on certification alone.
