= Christopher Tait =

American singer

- Also known as: Tait Nucleus?
- Born: United States
- Genres: Alternative rock; dance-rock; dance-punk; freak folk
- Occupations: Singer; songwriter; musician
- Instruments: Vocals; synthesizers; guitar

Christopher Tait, also known as Tait Nucleus?, is an American singer, songwriter and musician. He is best known as the synthesizer player of the rock band Electric Six and the founder of Passenger Recovery. Although he was credited as an associate on Fire, it wasn't until the band's lineup change in 2002 when he officially joined. His inclusion took the group from a five-piece to a six-piece band, rendering the joke of their name (Electric Six despite only featuring five members) invalid.

== Discography ==
=== Electric Six ===
Year	Album	Synthesizer	Music Writer	Other
2003	Fire	Yes	No	Credited as an "associate"
2005	Señor Smoke	Yes	Yes ("Boy Or Girl", "Vibrator")	
2006	Switzerland	Yes	Yes ("Rubber Rocket")	piano
2007	I Shall Exterminate Everything Around Me That Restricts Me from Being the Master	Yes	Yes ("Broken Machine")	
2008	Flashy	Yes	No	Credited with "Bleep Blop"
2009	Kill	Yes	Yes ("My Idea Of Fun")	
2010	Zodiac	Yes	No	
2011	Heartbeats and Brainwaves	Yes	Yes ("I Go Through Phases")	
2012	Absolute Pleasure	Yes	No	
2013	Mustang	Yes	No	
2014	Human Zoo	Yes	No	
2015	Mimicry and Memories	Yes	No	
2015	Bitch, Don't Let Me Die!	Yes	Yes ("Drone Strikes", "Kids Are Evil" and "If U R Who U Say U R")	
2016	Roulette Stars of Metro Detroit	Yes ("An Omen of Things to Come", "I Upgraded to You" and "Shrink the Bastards")	Yes ("An Omen of Things to Come" and "I Upgraded to You")	guitar on "An Omen of Things to Come", drum programming on "I Upgraded to You") and producer of "Night Vision (Dubai Bros. Remix)"
2016	Fresh Blood for Tired Vampyres	Yes	Yes ("The Number of the Beast", "I'll Be In Touch", "Lottery Reptiles" and "Greener Pastures"	
2017	You're Welcome!	Yes	No	
2017	How Dare You?	Yes	No	
2018	Bride of the Devil	Yes	Yes ("Daddy's Boy")	

== Dubai Bros. ==
Tait produces remixes under the Dubai Bros.

Year	Title	Project
2011	Interchangeable Knife (Dubai Bros. Remix)	Single released to coincide with release of Electric Six album "Heartbeats and Brainwaves".
2014	Lakes of Fire (Dubai Bros. Remix)	Remix of Belle Ghoul song "Lakes of Fire".
2016	Lift Me Up (Dubai Bros. Remix)	B-side on the single release of Belle Ghoul song "Lift Me Up".
2016	Night Vision (Dubai Bros. Remix)	Song released on the "Roulette Stars of Metro Detroit" soundtrack album by Electric Six. It is a remix of a song from their album "Switzerland".
2017	Making Progress (Dubai Bros. Remix)	Song released on the Electric Six album "You're Welcome!". It is a remix of a song featured on their album "Flashy".
2017	Transatlantic Flight (Dubai Bros. Remix)	Song released on the Electric Six album "You're Welcome!". It is a remix of a song featured on their album "Flashy"

== Ghost City ==
Ghost City was a band featuring Tait on keyboard and vocals. They were active from 2005 until 2007.

They released one album, the self-titled Ghost City in 2008.

== Belle Ghoul ==
Tait is a founding member of the band Belle Ghoul, started in 2011.

They released their first album Rabbit's Moon & Doomsday in 2014.

== Laser Destroyer Team ==
Tait is a founding member of the band Laser Destroyer Team, started in 2014, alongside Keith Thompson (aka Smörgåsbord, Electric Six's longest serving bassist), Chad Thompson (who had previously worked with Electric Six on "Heartbeats and Brainwaves" and Shaun Hatton.

The band specifically produce music for video games.

=== Discography ===
Year	Title	Project
2014	Always Sometimes Monsters EP	The first soundtrack release from "Always Sometimes Monsters".
2014	Always Sometimes Monsters LP	The second soundtrack release from "Always Sometimes Monsters".
2014	Always Sometimes Monsters XP	The third soundtrack release from "Always Sometimes Monsters".
2015	AUTODESTRON	
2016	Phantasy Star LP	A cover album focused on the score from Phantasy Star.

== Passenger Recovery ==
Tait founded Passenger Recovery as a service that provides resources for people recovering from addiction while on the road. In an interview with The Spill Magazine, Tait explained how the project started: "Passenger Recovery started basically from personal experience. So we bought this house in Detroit where travelling musicians can go to have a sober green room. There is recovery reading, chargers, coffee and most importantly peace and quiet.”

Passenger set out to create that network and provide easy access to the help those in need when their usual support systems are miles and miles away. In an article Tait wrote for the creative collective Nothing in the Rulebook, he said that he hoped his own personal experiences of addiction would mean the project worked for others finding themselves in a similar situation: "I’m not alone, and much as my ego would like me to be the only single “tortured artist” on the planet that’s ever dealt with this, I’m not. We’re everywhere [...] Our hope is to present a united front where artists from all walks of life can stand together to support those who have recognized issues or concerns in their own lives."

Since the project began, a number of other creative artists have become involved or pledged their support to the campaign, including Flogging Molly, Patti Smith, The Sword, the Flint Institute of Arts, Wayne State Press, and Lol Tolhurst.

== Filmography ==
Year	Title	Project	Role
2006	I Buy the Drugs	Electric Six music video	Himself – Tait Nucleus?
2008	Formula 409	Electric Six music video	Himself – Tait Nucleus?
2011	You're a Mean One, Mr. Grinch	Electric Six live performance video produced for The A.V. Club	Himself – Tait Nucleus?
2012	That Voodoo You Do, or 'The Legba Luncheon	short film	Harlem Hank
2014	Absolute Treasure	Electric Six concert film	Himself – Tait Nucleus?
2016	Roulette Stars of Metro Detroit	Electric Six mockumentary feature film	Himself – Tait Nucleus?
2017	I Got the Box	Electric Six music video	Harlem Hank

== Personal life ==
As of 2020, Tait lives in Detroit, Michigan, with his wife.
