= Pokémon Theme =

Anime theme song

Song by Jason Paige

from the album Pokémon 2.B.A. Master
- Released: June 29, 1999
- Recorded: 1998–1999
- Genre: Pop
- Length: 3:15
- Songwriters: John Siegler; John Loeffler
- Producer: John Loeffler

Audio sample
- "Pokémon Theme": file; help

Opening credit video
- "Pokémon: Indigo League Opening Theme" on YouTube

"Pokémon Theme" (also known as "Gotta catch 'em all!") is a song written by John Siegler and John Loeffler and performed by Jason Paige. It is the original theme song for the first season of the English adaptation of the Pokémon anime. Since its release, the song has been virtually synonymous with the Pokémon franchise because the line "Gotta catch 'em all!" has become its official English slogan; it is derived from the Japanese ポケモンGETだぜ! ("Pokemon [getto] da ze!").

== Background and development ==
John Siegler and John Loeffler wrote the lyrics to the song. Siegler produced the track, also playing keyboards, bass, and programming drum machines. David Rolfe, the vocalist for later themes of the series, played the guitar while Jason Paige provided the vocals. Kati Mac, Loeffler, Ken Cummings and Louis Cortelezzi provided background vocals. The song was written in G minor. Siegler initially felt the show's concept was "incomprehensible" but decided it had potential after viewing its debut episode. Jason Paige recorded the original theme song in four hours. Paige initially received a "standard, three-figure flat fee" for the recording, but did not receive any royalties from the song. He received a one-time payment "in the mid-five figures" for the song in 2000. Paige claimed that he "didn't really know much about Pokémon" when he did the demo, other than a scene in the animated series that caused bouts of epileptic seizures in Japan. The theme song premiered on the debut episode "Pokémon, I Choose You!" on September 7, 1998. In 1999, Paige recorded an extended version of the theme song for the album Pokémon 2.B.A. Master.

According to Norman Grossfeld, the then-president of 4Kids Productions, the line "Gotta catch 'em all!" was created as a "tagline for marketing purposes that would also be included in the theme song". It is derived from the Japanese tagline "(ポケモンGETだぜ!, Pokémon getto da ze!)". One other contender for the tagline was "Catch 'em if you can", which was used in an earlier version of the theme song.

== Commercial performance ==
On the US Dance Singles Sales chart in January 2000, the "Pokémon Theme" peaked at number three for two weeks. The track peaked at number 10 on the US Kid Digital Song Sales chart by January 2010. In July 2016, after the release of the mobile game Pokémon Go, the theme song saw a 382% increase in listeners on music streaming platform Spotify. That same month, it rose from number 17 to number four on the Kid Digital Song Sales chart with over 7,000 downloads.

== Charts ==
=== Weekly charts ===
Chart (1999-2016)	Peak position
Sweden Heatseeker (Sverigetopplistan)	17
US Dance Singles Sales (Billboard)	3
US Kid Digital Song Sales (Billboard)	4

=== Year-end charts ===
Chart (2014)	Position
US Kid Digital Song Sales (Billboard)	19

NPO Radio 2 Top 2000 (Netherlands)

Year	Position
2015	1666
2016	232
2017	284
2018	115
2019	127
2020	186
2021	165
2022	142
2023	151
2024	152
2025	167

== Certifications ==
Certifications and sales for "Pokémon Theme"
Region	Certification	Certified units/sales
United Kingdom (BPI) Sales since 2011	Silver	200,000^{‡}
^{‡} Sales+streaming figures based on certification alone.

== Cover versions ==
The theme song has been covered by various artists. A cover of "Pokémon Theme" was first released as a maxi single by Robbins Entertainment on October 26, 1999. This version peaked at number three on the Maxi-Singles Sales chart in January 2000. The single peaked at number 36 on the year-end Hot Dance Maxi-Singles Sales chart for that year. It was covered by Billy Crawford for the opening of Pokémon: The First Movie and was included on its soundtrack. In 2014, it was covered by Ben Dixon and the Sad Truth for the English broadcast of Pokémon The Series: XY. A second cover by Ben Dixon was featured in the films Pokémon the Movie: I Choose You! (2017) and Pokémon Detective Pikachu (2019); this cover was also used in the official trailer for the Pokémon: Let's Go, Pikachu! and Let's Go, Eevee! video games in 2018. A third cover was sung during the closing ceremony of the 2026 Pokémon World Championships.

Others who have covered the theme song included Postmodern Jukebox, Kurt Hugo Schneider with Lindsey Stirling, Eric Calderone, Baracksdubs, Tay Zonday, Powerglove, Xander Mobus, Nathan Sykes, and Poppy.

== In popular culture ==
The theme song was featured in the 2000 video game Pokémon Puzzle League, as well as the 2004 video game, Donkey Konga.

In November 2005, the internet comedy duo Smosh recorded a lip-dubbed video for the song on YouTube. It briefly became the most viewed video on the site in March 2006 before being surpassed by "Dancing In The Dark" that March. In June 2007, Smosh's video was removed on YouTube due to a copyright notice. In 2010, Smosh recreated the video with altered lyrics that criticized the original video being taken down. In 2016, the original vocalist Jason Paige performed a parody of the song featuring Dwayne Johnson as well as YouTube stars MatPat and Ali-A.

During the Eurovision Song Contest 2021, the Norwegian representative, Tix, sang a parody of the theme song as a love serenade to the Azerbaijani representative, Samira Efendi, whom Tix had shown an affection for since the beginning of the contest.

=== Use in politics ===
During the 2012 primary election, the original vocalist Jason Paige performed a parody of the song in support of the Republican candidate Ron Paul.

On September 22, 2025, the Department of Homeland Security used the song in a video of alleged illegal immigrants getting captured by officers, intercut with footage of Ash Ketchum throwing Poké Balls. The video ends with Pokémon cards featuring some of the arrested individuals. It was also posted by the official White House TikTok account. Two days later, The Pokémon Company International released a statement in response to the videos, noting that "permission was not granted for the use of our intellectual property."

== See also ==
- List of Pokémon theme songs
