= Yah Mo B There =

1983 single by James Ingram and Michael McDonald

Single by James Ingram and Michael McDonald

from the album It's Your Night
- B-side: "Come a Da Machine (To Take a My Place)"
- Released: December 9, 1983
- Recorded: 1983
- Genre: R&B, synth-pop
- Length: 4:40 4:02 (7-inch)
- Label: Qwest, Warner Bros.
- Songwriters: James Ingram; Michael McDonald; Rod Temperton; Quincy Jones
- Producer: Quincy Jones

James Ingram singles chronology
"Party Animal" (1983)	"Yah Mo B There" (1983)	"There's No Easy Way" (1984)

Michael McDonald singles chronology
"I Gotta Try" (1982)	"Yah Mo B There" (1984)	"No Lookin' Back" (1985)

"Yah Mo B There" is a contemporary R&B song, recorded as a duet by American singers James Ingram and Michael McDonald. It was written by Ingram, McDonald, Rod Temperton and producer Quincy Jones. The song originally appeared on Ingram's 1983 album, It's Your Night, via Jones's Qwest Records label. It was released as a single in late 1983, peaking in 1984 at No. 19 on the U.S. Hot 100 chart and No. 44 on the UK Singles Chart.

A remixed version by John Benitez reached No. 12 in the UK, during the spring of 1985. It has subsequently appeared on several of Ingram's and McDonald's greatest hits albums, as well as various 1980s compilation albums.

The performance earned the duo a 1985 Grammy Award for Grammy Award for Best R&B Performance by a Duo or Group with Vocals. It was one of a series of very successful duets involving Ingram. It also received a Grammy Award nomination for Best R&B Song, losing to "I Feel for You" by Chaka Khan.

== Personnel ==
- James Ingram, Michael Boddicker, Rod Temperton – synthesizer
- Michael McDonald – vocals, synthesizer
- John "J.R." Robinson – drums
- Paulinho Da Costa – percussion

== Charts ==
Chart (1983/1984)	Peak position
Irish Singles Chart	12
UK Singles Chart	44
U.S. Billboard Hot 100	19
U.S. Billboard Hot Black Singles	5
Chart (1985)	Peak position
UK Singles Chart	12

Year-end chart (1984)	Rank
US Top Pop Singles (Billboard)	100

== Cover versions ==
In 1988, R&B singer Jon Gibson covered "Yah Mo B There" on his Change of Heart album, released via Frontline Records. The pop record featured the emerging rap artist MC Hammer.

In 1996, "Yah Mo B There" was covered by Louise Seville, and released in the United Kingdom.

In 2005, British singer Steve Brookstein covered a slightly re-written version of the song with BeBe Winans, for his Heart and Soul album.

In 2017, Melbourne based electronic artist Paradise Box covered the song for his 'Hookup" EP on UK label Crimes Of The Future.

In 2021, American rock band Electric Six covered the song for their Streets of Gold album.

== In popular culture ==
The song was referred to in the 2005 film The 40-Year-Old Virgin. The main characters work in an electronics store in which a Michael McDonald concert DVD has constantly been playing on the TVs for two years. A salesman, David (played by Paul Rudd), has developed an intense hatred of the DVD and tells the manager, "Nothing against him [Michael McDonald], but if I hear 'Yah Mo B There' one more time, I'm gonna 'yah mo' burn this place to the ground!"

In the comedy web series, Yacht Rock, Ingram and McDonald write "Yah Mo" after mishearing Kenny Loggins say "Yeah, I'll be there" while eating an apple, and talking on a cordless telephone.

In the animated TV series American Dad!, the song was used in the episode "Home Wrecker" as a favorite of Principal Lewis, and sung by Steve and his friends.
