= Dancing in the Dark =

Dancing in the Dark may refer to:

== Film and television ==
- Dancing in the Dark (1949 film), an American musical comedy directed by Irving Reis
- Dancing in the Dark (1986 film), a Canadian drama directed by Leon Marr
- "Dancing in the Dark" (Charlie's Angels), a 1977 television episode
- "Dancing in the Dark" (The Golden Girls), a 1989 television episode
- "Dancing in the Dark" (Jake and the Fatman), a 1989 television episode
- Dancing in the Dark, a 1995 television film starring Victoria Principal

== Literature ==
- Dancing in the Dark (novel), a 2005 novel by Caryl Phillips
- Dancing in the Dark, a 1982 novel by Joan Barfoot
- Dancing in the Dark, a 2005 novel by Mary Jane Clark
- Dancing in the Dark, a 1997 novel by Stuart M. Kaminsky
- Dancing in the Dark, a 1999 novel by Maureen Lee
- Dancing in the Dark, a novel by Susan Moody
- Dancing in the Dark, a 1992 novel by Donald Thomas

== Music ==
=== Albums ===
- Dancing in the Dark (Carmen Cavallaros album), 1939 and 1946
- Dancing in the Dark (Sonny Rollins album), 1987
- Dancing in the Dark (Rob Schneiderman album), 1998
- Dancing in the Dark, by the Fred Hersch Trio, 1992
- Dancing in the Dark, by Tierney Sutton, 2004
- Dancing in the Dark, an EP by Hot Chip, or the title song, 2015
- Dancing in the Dark: 10 Years of Dancing Ferret, by Dancing Ferret, 2005

=== Songs ===
- "Dancing in the Dark" (Bruce Springsteen song), 1984
- "Dancing in the Dark" (Howard Dietz and Arthur Schwartz song), 1931
- "Dancing in the Dark" (Jessy song), 2006
- "Dancing in the Dark" (Kim Wilde song), 1983
- "Dancing in the Dark" (Rihanna song), 2015
- "Dancing in the Dark", by Imagine Dragons from Evolve, 2017
- "Dancing in the Dark", by Mike Mareen, 1985
- "Dancing in the Dark", by Solange Knowles from Sol-Angel and the Hadley St. Dreams, 2008
- "Dancing in the Dark", by Sykamore from Pinto, 2022

== Other uses ==
- "Dancing in the Dark", the most viewed YouTube video from March to May 2006, uploaded by Cosmotastic

== See also ==
- "Dance in the Dark", a 2009 song by Lady Gaga
- Dance in the Dark (horse), a Japanese Thoroughbred racehorse
- Dancer in the Dark (disambiguation)
