= Bitch, Don't Let Me Die! =

Studio album by Electric Six
- Released: October 2, 2015
- Length: 39:27
- Label: Metropolis
- Producer: Johnny Na$hinal

Electric Six chronology
Mimicry (2015) Human Zoo (2014)	Bitch, Don't Let Me Die! (2015)	Roulette Stars of Metro Detroit (2016) - Fresh Blood for Tired Vampyres (2016)

Professional ratings
Review scores
Source	Rating
AllMusic	3.5/5 stars

Bitch, Don't Let Me Die! is the twelfth album by Detroit rock band Electric Six and the eleventh in their official canon. It was released on Metropolis Records on October 2, 2015. It is the last album to feature longtime drummer Percussion World before his departure later in the year to join Flogging Molly.

== Track listing ==
1. "Drone Strikes" – 2:40
2. "Two Dollar Two" – 3:48
3. "Kids Are Evil" – 3:04
4. "Roulette!" – 2:58
5. "A Variation of Elaine" – 2:51
6. "Slow Motion Man" – 4:36
7. "Big Red Arthur" – 3:43
8. "Dime Dime Penny Dime" – 2:44
9. "If U R Who U Say U R" – 3:43
10. "When Cowboys File for Divorce" – 3:22
11. "Take Another Shape" – 3:30
12. "Electric Six!" – 2:28

== Personnel ==
- Dick Valentine – vocals
- Tait Nucleus? – synthesizer
- Johnny Na$hinal – guitar
- Percussion World – drums
- Da Vé – guitar
- Rob Lower – bass
- Nicole Kathleen Tausney – background vocals
