= Bride of the Devil =

Studio album by Electric Six
- Released: October 5, 2018
- Length: 34:07
- Label: Metropolis
- Producer: Christopher Tait; Matt Tompkins

Electric Six chronology
| How Dare You? (2017) | Bride of the Devil (2018) | A Very Electric SiXmas (2018) - Streets of Gold (2021) |

Professional ratings
Review scores
| Source | Rating |
|---|---|
| AllMusic | 3.5/5 stars |

Bride of the Devil is the seventeenth album by Detroit rock band Electric Six and the fourteenth in their official canon.

== Track listing ==
All songs written by Electric Six.

1. "The Opener" – 3:01
2. "Daddy's Boy" – 3:04
3. "(It Gets) (A Little) Jumpy" – 2:35
4. "Safety Girl" – 3:02
5. "You're Toast" – 3:21
6. "Hades Ladies" – 3:14
7. "Bride of the Devil" – 3:08
8. "Witches Burning" – 3:01
9. "Full Moon over the Internet" – 3:20
10. "Grey Areas" – 3:06
11. "The Worm in the Wood" – 3:14

== Personnel ==
Electric Six

- Dick Valentine – vocals
- Johnny Na$hinal – lead guitar
- Da Vé – rhythm guitar
- Rob Lower – bass
- Tait Nucleus? – keyboards

Additional personnel

- Tude Glase – drums
- Holspolo
- Herb S. Flavorings
