= Turquoise (Electric Six album) =

Studio album by Electric Six
- Released: September 8, 2023
- Genre: Rock
- Label: Metropolis
- Producer: Johnny Na$hinal

Electric Six chronology
Streets of Gold (2021)	Turquoise (2023)

Turquoise is the eighteenth studio album by Electric Six. It was released on September 8, 2023 through Metropolis Records.

== Reviews ==
The Moshville Times wrote "If you are familiar with Electric Six, then Turquoise should delight you. It’s got everything you expect, want, desire, from this unique band. The disco pulse, the rock and roll, the alternative element, and overall, it’s wrapped in the quality this band deliver. Who else can produce a song called “Staten Island Ass Squad” without so much as a blink. Yes indeed, Valentine, lead guitarist Johnny Na$hinal, keyboardist Tait Nucleus?, rhythm guitarist Herb S. Flavourings, drummer Dr. J and bassist Smorgasbord have delivered once more."

Qro magazine said "All the hallmarks of Electric Six are here. There’s frontman Dick Valentine’s mock come-on in the opener “Take Me To the Sugar”, as well as such unique figures as “Dr. K”. The group’s mock-horror comes out in “Child of Hunger” and big closer “The Wheel Finds a Way”. There’s a mock-country tune, “Born To Be Ridiculed”, because Electric Six mock much. And the band to party to at the end of the world gives a song for when “things go tits up” in the title track."

Joyzine said "‘Turquoise’ was deeper and had more layers than I had maybe expected. While there is definitely some party rock vibes and silliness- ‘Staten Island Ass Squad’- surely scores silly points for the song title alone. This album shows there is more than party rock to Electric Six. ‘Units of Time’ has a bluesy, country feel, ‘Child of Hunger’ feels like a homage to 80’s hair metal, and ‘Born to be Ridiculed’ takes on an fifties style rock n roll influence. Nobody can say these guys are an one trick pony."

ReGen magazine wrote "So, was Turquoise worth the wait? Well, while fanatics will revel in any new material these days, there’s still enough in the shop window to hook the curiosity of any passerby. If you do step inside, you should enter with your tongue firmly in your cheek and with your critical thinking jacket off. For Electric Six isn’t a band that worries about being too cliché… on the contrary, they worry about not being cliché enough! And you’ll be pleased to know that the mischievous spirit is still very much alive."

== Track listing ==
No.	Title	Length
1.	"Take Me to the Sugar"	3:50
2.	"Doctor K"	3:04
3.	"Hot Numbers on the Telephone"	2:51
4.	"Panic! Panic!"	3:50
5.	"Turquoise"	4:31
6.	"Skyrocketing"	3:11
7.	"Born to Be Ridiculed"	2:12
8.	"Child of Hunger"	2:55
9.	"Staten Island Ass Squad"	4:16
10.	"Window of Time"	2:32
11.	"Units of Time"	3:12
12.	"Five Clowns"	2:50
13.	"The Browning of Her Bones"	3:02
14.	"The Wheel Finds a Way"	3:58
