= Dancer in the Dark (short story) =

2004 short story by David Gerrold

"Dancer in the Dark" was originally published in The Magazine of Fantasy & Science Fiction

"Dancer in the Dark" is a 2004 science fiction story by American writer David Gerrold. It was the cover story in the April 2004 issue of The Magazine of Fantasy & Science Fiction and was also selected for the anthology The Year's Best Science Fiction and Fantasy for Teens edited by Jane Yolen and Patrick Nielsen Hayden (2005).

== Plot summary ==
The story appears to take place in an alternate version of North America in the present or near-future. Following the collapse of social order in cities, the newly orphaned teenager Michael is put aboard a refugee train and sent to work on a small-town farm. Conditions are difficult because the countryside is covered with "darklines", a type of wire that absorbs light, making the environment dull and gloomy and seemingly draining all the townsfolk of vitality and joy. The darklines have been erected in an attempt to prevent the encroachment of a strange "brightness" which the townsfolk claim will cause anyone who enters it to go blind and mad and eventually die.

Wearing protective gear and dark goggles, the townspeople show Michael the brightness; he risks taking off his goggles for a brief peek and is surprised to see what looks like a naked boy of about his own age, dancing in the light. He guesses that the boy must be his predecessor Doey, who ran off into the brightness and was believed dead. Michael learns that Doey was not the only one, and begins to suspect that the brightness may not be as deadly as the locals believe. His suspicions are strengthened when Doey, still naked and glowing with brilliant colors, briefly dances into the darkness to taunt and invite Michael when no one else is watching.

Doey's joyful attitude and his androgynous beauty stir feelings in Michael that he does not fully understand, and he is torn between remaining in the gloom of his familiar world or taking his chances in the light. Seeing his change of attitude the townsfolk guess that Michael has been touched by the brightness, and decide to use him as bait in a trap. Their plan is to leave Michael in an old house on the border of the brightness and activate a new darkline to trap anyone who comes for him. Instead the brightness overtakes the house. Under its influence Michael feels all of the joy and vitality he has never been able to experience in the dark. Putting aside his inhibitions and clothing he joins Doey and the others who have left the darkness behind forever. Doey has sabotaged the local darklines, and invites Michael to join him in bringing them all down. According to Doey all of the dark-dwellers will eventually have to choose, either to join the brightness-dwellers or to die.
