= Mimicry and Memories =

2015 studio album by Electric Six

Compilation album by Electric Six
- Released: March 2015
- Genre: Rock
- Length: 116:08
- Producer: Alan Cooper; Davey Kimsey; Electric Six; Ken "Doom Bunny" Hughes; Kevin Ingersoll; Pat Divis; Tammy C. Lymond

Electric Six chronology
Human Zoo (2014)	Mimicry and Memories (2015)	Bitch, Don't Let Me Die! (2015)

Mimicry and Memories is a compilation album by Electric Six. Disc one, Mimicry, is composed of cover songs. Disc two, Memories, consists of demos, B-sides and rarities. It was funded through a Kickstarter campaign and self-released directly to the campaign's backers.

== Production ==
Following the success of the cover songs recorded as perks in the band's "Absolute Treasure" campaign, the band launched a Kickstarter campaign to raise $25,000 in order to fund the album. It was successful with a total of $64,977 being raised.

Each member of the band chose a song to cover on the Mimicry portion of the album. Dick Valentine selected "Ah! Leah!" by Donnie Iris, Smorgasbord selected "The Look" by Roxette, Da Ve selected "Buckingham Green" by Ween, Tait Nucleus? selected "I Got the Six" by ZZ Top, Percussion World selected "Do You Love Me? by Kiss and Johnny Na$hinal selected "Girls Want To Be With the Girls" by Talking Heads.

One specific pledge reward as part of the Kickstarter campaign was to choose a song to be covered on the album. The four songs chosen by fans through this method were "Turn Me Loose" by Loverboy, "Rockets" by Tomas Ford, "Stuck In a Closet with Vanna White" by "Weird Al" Yankovic and "Cat People (Putting Out Fire)" by David Bowie.

As a stretch goal, the project's backers were given the option to vote for an additional cover to be included. The options were "Everywhere" by Fleetwood Mac (which the band were performing in live shows at the time), "Easy Lover" by Philip Bailey and Phil Collins and "In the Dark" by Billy Squier. "Everywhere" won the vote and was included on the album. Due to the tight vote, a second stretch goal was announced allowing backers to vote for one of the two losing songs to also be included. "Easy Lover" won the vote and was included.

== Track listing ==
Mimicry track listing
No.	Title	Writer(s)	Length
1.	"Everywhere" (Originally recorded by Fleetwood Mac)	Christine McVie	3:27
2.	"Easy Lover" (Originally recorded by Philip Bailey and Phil Collins)	Nathan East, Phil Collins and Philip Bailey	4:55
3.	"Ah! Leah!" (Originally recorded by Donnie Iris)	Donnie Iris and Mark Avsec	3:39
4.	"Cat People" (Originally recorded by David Bowie)	David Bowie and Giorgio Moroder	5:11
5.	"Do You Love Me?" (Originally recorded by Kiss)	Bob Ezrin, Kim Fowley and Paul Stanley	3:32
6.	"Buckingham Green" (Originally recorded by Ween)	Aaron Freeman and Mickey Melchiondo	3:20
7.	"I Got the Six" (Originally recorded by ZZ Top)	Billy Gibbons, Dusty Hill and Frank Beard	2:52
8.	"The Look" (Originally recorded by Roxette)	Per Gessle	3:58
9.	"Girls Want To Be With the Girls" (Originally recorded by Talking Heads)	David Byrne	3:36
10.	"Stuck In A Closet With Vanna White" (Originally recorded by "Weird Al" Yankovic)	"Weird Al" Yankovic	4:47
11.	"Rockets" (Originally recorded by Tomás Ford)	Tomás Ford	3:51
12.	"Turn Me Loose" (Originally recorded by Loverboy)	Mike Reno and Paul Dean	5:40
Total length:			48:47

Memories track listing
No.	Title	Writer(s)	Length
13.	"Exterminate Tour Intro" (Played to introduce the band during their Exterminate tour)	Tyler Spencer	1:31
14.	"Dance Epidemic (XFM Session)" (A version of the song from Señor Smoke recorded at XFM)	Tyler Spencer	2:41
15.	"Typical Sagittarius" (Demo originally intended for inclusion on Zodiac)	Tyler Spencer	3:16
16.	"The Sheik Don't Lie" (Demo originally intended for inclusion on Señor Smoke)	Tyler Spencer	2:24
17.	"Taxi 2 Nowhere (Demo)" (Demo of Taxi to Nowhere featured on Señor Smoke)	Tyler Spencer	1:31
18.	"Shortlove" (Unused demo)	Tyler Spencer	2:18
19.	"Night Vision (Demo)" (Demo of the song featured on Switzerland)	Tyler Spencer	3:23
20.	"One" (Originally recorded by Harry Nilsson, was recorded and submitted to EA for inclusion in an ad campaign for Army of Two, but Mastodon were chosen instead.)	Harry Nilsson	3:18
21.	"I Don't Speak French (Demo)" (Demo originally intended for inclusion on I Shall Exterminate Everything Around Me That Restricts Me from Being the Master but ultimately recorded for Dick Valentine's solo album Destroy the Children)	Tyler Spencer	2:42
22.	"I Can Translate" (Bonus track originally included on the iTunes deluxe edition of Zodiac)	Tyler Spencer	2:44
23.	"My Struggle With Heroin" (Unused demo)	Tyler Spencer	3:19
24.	"Free Samples (Demo)" (Demo of the song of the same name on Heartbeats and Brainwaves)	Tyler Spencer	2:13
25.	"Badass" (Unused demo)	Tyler Spencer	2:15
26.	"Gay Bar (Live At Manumission Ibiza 2004)" (Live recording)	Tyler Spencer	2:40
27.	"The Warrior" (Originally recorded by Scandal, recorded during the Zodiac sessions with the original intention being included on the album. That changed to releasing it online for free as a gift to fans when it wasn't completed in time)	Holly Knight and Nick Gilder	4:02
28.	"Dancing Like An Idiot" (Unused demo)	Tyler Spencer	1:58
29.	"Technical Difficulties" (Unused demo)	Tyler Spencer	1:01
30.	"Slices Of You (Demo)" (Demo of the song featured on Switzerland)	Tyler Spencer	4:37
31.	"Turn It Up (Demo)" (Unused demo)	Tyler Spencer	2:46
32.	"Strike While The Iron Is Hot (Demo)" (Unused demo)	Tyler Spencer	3:28
33.	"Ziggy" (Song commissioned by a pledger on the band's previous Kickstarter campaign)	Tyler Spencer	3:25
34.	"Fucking In Another Man's Clothes" (Recorded for Human Zoo but left off of the album due to space-requirements when pressing it to vinyl)	Tyler Spencer	3:53
35.	"Suitcases" (Recorded for Human Zoo but left off of the album due to space-requirements when pressing it to vinyl)	Tyler Spencer	2:47
36.	"WikiLeaks" (Recorded for Human Zoo but left off of the album due to space-requirements when pressing it to vinyl)	Tyler Spencer	3:30
Total length:			67:21

Two additional tracks, "White Eyes – Demo" and "Bleed for the Artist – Demo" were originally announced on the album's tracklisting but were not included in the original package. The band made the statement that this was due to them sounding almost identical to the finished songs and them deciding that they weren't worth including. Due to fan backlash that this caused, they made the demos freely available to download on the band's official SoundCloud page.

== Personnel ==
- Dick Valentine – vocals
- Tait Nucleus? – synthesizer
- Johnny Na$hinal – guitar
- Percussion World – drums
- Smorgasboard – bass (Mimicry, tracks 13, 15, 20–22, 24, 27, 33–36)
- Da Ve – guitar (Mimicry, tracks 33–36)
- John R. Dequindre – bass (14, 16, 17, 19, 30)
- The Colonel – guitar (tracks 13, 14, 16, 17, 19, 21–22, 27, 30)
