= Kill (Electric Six album) =

Studio album by Electric Six
- Released: October 20, 2009
- Studio: Big Sky Recording, Ann Harbor, Michigan
- Genre: Rock
- Length: 43:24
- Label: Metropolis Records
- Producer: Electric Six, Zach Shipps

Electric Six chronology
Flashy (2008)	Kill (2009)	Zodiac (2010)

Professional ratings
Aggregate scores
Source	Rating
Metacritic	67/100
Review scores
Source	Rating
AllMusic	3.5/5 stars
Classic Rock	6/10
PopMatters	8/10
Q	3/5 stars
Slant Magazine	3.5/5 stars
Spin	3/5 stars

Kill is the sixth album by Detroit rock band Electric Six, which was released in October 2009.

== Release ==
Prior to its release, the working title for the album was Sign of the Beefcarver, named after a restaurant in Detroit.

The album was released by Metropolis Records on October 20, 2009. A music video for the album's opening track, Body Shot, was released earlier in the same month.

The cross-stitch cover art for KILL was produced by Detroit artist/writer Shannon McCarthy.

== Track listing ==
All songs written by Tyler Spencer.

1. "Body Shot" – 3:46
2. "Waste of Time and Money" – 3:28
3. "Egyptian Cowboy" – 4:20
4. "Escape from Ohio" – 3:11
5. "Rubbin' Me the Wrong Way" – 3:04
6. "One Sick Puppy" – 2:53
7. "Steal Your Bones" – 4:20
8. "My Idea of Fun" – 3:17
9. "I Belong in a Factory" – 2:32
10. "The Newark Airport Boogie" – 3:00
11. "Simulated Love" – 3:30
12. "You're Bored" – 1:45
13. "White Eyes" – 4:20

== Personnel ==
=== Electric Six ===
- Dick Valentine – vocals
- Tait Nucleus? – synthesizer
- The Colonel – guitar
- Johnny Na$hinal – guitar
- Smörgåsbord – bass
- Percussion World – drums

=== Additional musicians ===
- John R. Dequindre – bass on track 5
- Kristin von Bernthal – background vocals on track 7
- Matt Aljian – timpani on track 7
- Korin Louise Visocchi – background vocals on track 11

== Legacy ==
- "The Newark Airport Boogie" was included on a charity fund-raising album, The Haiti Project, which was released to raise money to aide relief efforts related to the 2010 Haiti earthquake. Other artists on this release included The Wildhearts and Eureka Machines.
- A demo version of "White Eyes" was subsequently made available online via the band's SoundCloud page after, initially, being announced for inclusion on their Mimicry and Memories album but later being omitted.
- Dick Valentine recorded an acoustic version of "Steal Your Bones" for his solo album Quiet Time.
- Demos of "Waste of Time and Money", "Rubbin' Me the Wrong Way" and "I Belong in a Factory" were subsequently released on The Dick Valentine Raw Collection.
- The band performed a stripped-down version of "Steal Your Bones" on their third live album Chill Out!.
