= Electric Six =

American rock band

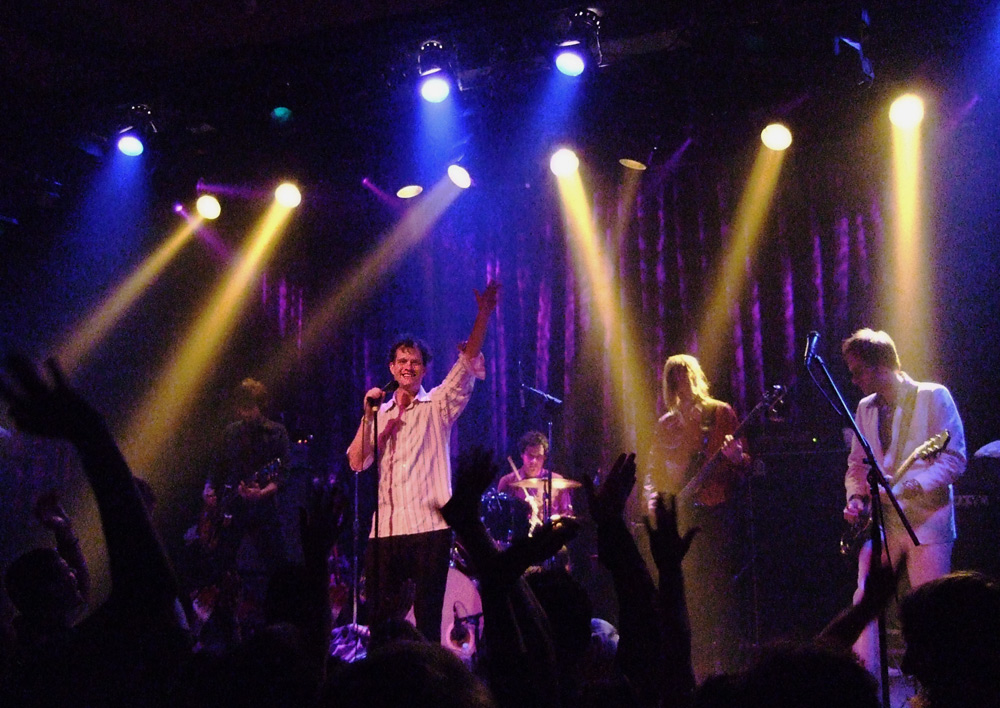
- Electric Six performing in October 2007

Background information
- Also known as: The Wildbunch
- Origin: Detroit, Michigan, U.S.
- Genres: Alternative rock; funk rock; hard rock; glam metal
- Years active: 1996–present
- Labels: Metropolis; Rushmore; V2; Warner Bros.; XL
- Members: Dick Valentine; Johnny Na$hinal; Tait Nucleus? Herb S Flavourings; Dr. J Rick Schaple
- Past members: The Rock and Roll Indian; Surge Joebot; Disco; M. Joe House; Gary Cook; Jeff Simmons; John R. Dequindre; The Colonel; Da Vé; Rob Lower; Percussion World; Two-Handed Bob; Hypercube Bonanza; Smorgasbord
- Website: electricsix.com

Electric Six is an American rock band formed in Detroit in 1996. They are known for combining elements of rock, disco, garage rock, metal, new wave, and punk rock. Since achieving widespread recognition in 2003 with the singles "Danger! High Voltage" and "Gay Bar", they have released 20 studio albums, two rarities albums, one live album and one live DVD. Each band member is given a unique stage name. The line-up has undergone changes over the years: co-founder, lead vocalist, and primary songwriter Dick Valentine has been the only constant member. The current line-up consists of Valentine, lead guitarist Johnny Na$hinal, keyboardist Tait Nucleus?, rhythm guitarist Herb S. Flavourings, drummer Dr. Jay and bassist Mr. Poison.

== History ==
=== 1990s ===
The band formed in Detroit in 1996 under the name the Wildbunch, but eventually dropped that name due to pressure from English musical collective the Wild Bunch. Throughout the late 1990s, they played regularly at the Old Miami and Gold Dollar clubs in Detroit, the center of a scene that also produced acts like the White Stripes. The band was originally composed of lead singer Dick Valentine (Tyler Spencer), drummer M. (Cory Martin), lead guitarist The Rock and Roll Indian (Anthony Selph), rhythm guitarist Surge Joebot (Joe Frezza), and bassist Disco (Steve Nawara, formerly of the Detroit Cobras).

Valentine has always been the primary songwriter, both music and lyrics, of the band. During the band's temporary split at the end of the 1990s, he formed his own band called the Dirty Shame and released one CD titled Smog Cutter Love Story which featured a rough draft of "Vengeance and Fashion", a song that later appeared on Electric Six's breakthrough album Fire.

=== 2000s ===
The band had reformed by 2001 to record and release "Danger! High Voltage" and record the track "Dealin' in Death and Stealin' in the Name of the Lord" with Troy Gregory for his Sybil album.

The 2003 release of "Danger! High Voltage" proved a massive hit for the band, particularly in Britain. The song also garnered attention after a rumor began to spread that the unidentified second vocalist featured on it, officially credited as someone named John S O'Leary, was The White Stripes' frontman Jack White before his band became popular. Although this was presented as fact in multiple sources, Electric Six guitarist Surge told an interviewer who asked about the singer's identity, "It's a fan. We put a competition out, and he won. He's a mechanic, it wasn't Jack White." Bassist Disco then added, "Yeah, he was probably the only person that entered." In another interview, drummer M. said that his lawyer had "advised [the band] to neither confirm nor deny the presence of Jack White". In a video published on his YouTube channel in 2018, Valentine confirmed that White is the secondary vocalist on the song.

The band's 2003 debut Fire (also produced and mixed by Damien Mendis and Stuart Bradbury) earned the group significant critical success, landing the "Danger! High Voltage" single at number 2 on the UK singles chart. Their second single, "Gay Bar", released in 2003, reached No. 5 in the UK charts. The song was reportedly inspired by a raucous night out in Detroit's gay club scene with former Crazy Town member Brandon Calabro. The album made it into several best-of-2003 lists, as well as reaching the top 10 in the UK album chart, and another single "Dance Commander", which gave Electric Six its third Top 40 single in the UK.

The Rock and Roll Indian, Surge Joebot and Disco all left the band after finishing the recording of Fire in June 2003, leaving Dick Valentine, M, and Tait Nucleus? as the remaining members. Four new musicians joined Electric Six shortly afterwards - lead guitarist Johnny Na$hinal (John Nash of The Volebeats, The Witches and solo effort The Alphabet), rhythm guitarist The Colonel (Zach Shipps, ex member of Brendan Benson, The Atomic Numbers, and Mood Elevator), guitarist John R. Dequindre (Chris Peters) and bass player Frank Lloyd Bonaventure (Mark Dundon), the last two both being ex members of Ann Arbor's whirlingRoad, Getaway Cruiser, and Six Clips. The Colonel had to opt out of early performances due to prior touring commitments. Bonaventure soon left to attain a Juris Doctor degree, and Dequindre consequently switched from guitar to bass.

In early 2004, Electric Six played at the Coachella Valley Music and Arts Festival.

The band's second album, Señor Smoke, was released in the United Kingdom on February 14, 2005. Since the band had been dropped from their previous American record label, a North American release of the album was delayed until February 7, 2006, when it came out on Metropolis Records. The first single from the album put the band at the center of controversy with Queen fans, following a cover of the hit Queen song "Radio Ga Ga". The controversial music video showed lead singer Dick Valentine portraying the ghost of late Queen frontman Freddie Mercury and performing with a backing band of poodles. Queen drummer and "Radio Ga Ga" writer Roger Taylor said that he was "unimpressed" with the video, though Queen guitarist Brian May reportedly liked it.

Valentine addressed the controversy and said, "Some have claimed this video portrays me dancing on Freddie Mercury's grave, but that wasn't the idea. Actually it's more like we are resurrecting Mr. Mercury for the duration of the song and his grave is the logical starting point. [...] I guess a video like that can be taken the wrong way, but we hadn't looked at it like that. [...] Everyone knows we disliked the fact that we had to put this song on our record, so this ridiculous video took a little bit of the sting out of it for us and made it somewhat bearable. [...] I definitely respect Freddie and his work."

In November 2004, drummer M. left the band, leaving Dick Valentine as the sole original member of the former Wildbunch. Their new drummer, Percussion World (Mike Alonso), had been affiliated with the band and its members for some time, and was named as a permanent member of the band. Electric Six finished recording their third album, titled Switzerland, in November 2005 and released it in North America on September 12, 2006. The band intended to record a video for every song on the album, "a lot of them...low budget."

In May 2007, Swedish bassist Smörgåsbord! (Keith Thompson, member of Johnny Headband) joined the band, replacing John R. Dequindre on the bass, who reportedly wished to spend more time on his other musical projects. I Shall Exterminate Everything Around Me That Restricts Me from Being the Master, Electric Six's fourth studio album, was released October 9, 2007. It has sixteen tracks. In the UK the album was released on October 22. 16 of the 18 tracks recorded were used on the album. There were no singles in support of this album; however, the band have had several music videos produced and spread over the internet for a number of tracks on the album.

A fifth album, Flashy, was released on October 21, 2008. This same year the band won the 2008 "My Heart" Competition for this album. The band promoted the album in the US, the UK and Spain on their 'Hitting the Walls and Working the Middle' tour. A 30 track album of demos and previously unreleased material titled Sexy Trash was released and made available at those shows. In May 2009, Metropolis records released "Covered in Gas" by Evil Cowards, a project by Valentine and Fall On Your Sword's William Bates.

KILL was released on October 20, 2009 in the US with the UK release following on November 2, 2009. Dick Valentine told the audience at Johnny Brenda's in Philadelphia on April 30, 2009 that the new fall release would be titled "Jared Styles"; however the final name for the album simply became KILL. A music video for first track on the album, "Body Shot", has been released on the internet, and is featured on the upcoming soundtrack of Michael Benveniste's "Tedd Can Chronicles".

=== 2010s ===
On February 14, 2010, Dick Valentine announced via the Electric Six website that the band is in the process of recording their 7th studio album. Valentine also mentioned that this album would contain a cover song that they have been contemplating for a long time. This cover has since been confirmed as "The Rubberband Man" by The Spinners.

On April 30, 2010, Dick Valentine confirmed at a concert at the University of Illinois Champaign-Urbana that the seventh album would be a twelve-track compilation titled Zodiac. It was released on September 28, 2010.

The band's eighth studio album, Heartbeats and Brainwaves, was announced through their official website on June 22, 2011. It was released on October 11. It was the first release of which Johnny Na$hinal served as producer. Previews of five tracks from the album were posted on the band's official Facebook page.

On January 30, 2012, the band announced via their website and Facebook that they were going to release a live album, titled Absolute Pleasure, in late 2012. The album was recorded at shows in Minneapolis and Chicago in May. Absolute Pleasure was initially reported to be a double album, with the first disc containing the entirety of their first album, Fire, and the second containing their "favorite tracks from all the other albums", however, these plans changed in development and the finished product was a single-disc amalgamation of both discs' content." A live DVD of Fire was also going to be filmed at the Shepherd's Bush Empire in London on December 15; however, these plans were cancelled and later revisited as the band's 2013 Absolute Treasure Kickstarter project.

Lead singer Dick Valentine released his first solo album Destroy the Children under the Dick Valentine moniker on May 14, 2012.

On February 16, 2013, the band launched a Kickstarter campaign for a live DVD called Absolute Treasure. The project was intended to give Electric Six the funds to film and release a live DVD of a performance to be filmed on September 7, 2013. The funding was successful.

On April 11, 2013, the band confirmed through their Facebook page that their next album, Mustang, would be released in October 2013, and was released on the 8th of the month.

Lead singer Dick Valentine released his second solo album Halloween Fingers under the Dick Valentine moniker on April 30, 2013.

Absolute Treasure was released for download in February 2014.

Towards the end of their 2013 tour, Dick Valentine confirmed on stage that they were working on a new album to be released in 2014. On January 22, 2014, the Electric Six Facebook page posted "Hey Crazies...work has commenced on studio album # 2,143...or 10, depending upon how you're keeping score. It'll be out in the fall. No confirmed title yet, so don't ask."

The title was later confirmed as Human Zoo on May 16, 2014, and was released for streaming on Spotify on October 13, 2014.

On June 6, 2014, Electric Six launched their second Kickstarter project; this time for a two-disc album titled Mimicry and Memories. Disc 1, Mimicry, being a cover album. Each member of the band personally selected a song to cover and the funding packages offered four fans the chance to choose a song to be included on the album. Songs included on Mimicry include covers of "One" by Harry Nilsson, "The Warrior" by Patty Smyth and Scandal, "The Look" by Roxette, "Do You Love Me?" by Kiss, "Everywhere" by Fleetwood Mac, "Easy Lover" by Phil Collins and Phillip Bailey, "Turn Me Loose" by Loverboy and "Cat People (Putting Out Fire)" by David Bowie.

Disc 2, Memories, served as a sequel to Sexy Trash, offering another selection of rarities, demos and B-sides from the band's back-catalogue. The project was successfully completed and was released to the public in March 2015.

Lead singer Dick Valentine announced the release of his third solo album, Here Come the Bags! under the Dick Valentine moniker. It was released on April 21, 2015.

On March 24, 2015, it was announced that bassist Smorgasbord was to leave the band. He was subsequently replaced by Matt Tompkins, AKA Rob Lower, from the band Mighty Tiny.

On October 2, 2015, the band released its eleventh studio album, titled Bitch, Don't Let Me Die! It was originally released for streaming via Spotify on Metropolis Records.

On January 7, 2016, the band suggested via their Instagram page that longtime drummer Percussion World would be leaving the group. A few weeks later, he surfaced as the new drummer for Celtic punk band Flogging Molly under his real name, Mike Alonso. He was replaced by Noah Appel, AKA Two-Handed Bob, who also was in Mighty Tiny with Matt Tompkins earlier.

2016 saw the fruition of the band's Roulette Stars of Metro Detroit project, a mockumentary feature film starring the band as themselves, funded by Kickstarter and complete with soundtrack album.

On July 29, 2016, the band announced its twelfth studio album, Fresh Blood for Tired Vampyres, which was released on October 7, 2016. Two Handed Bob left and was replaced by Hyperkube Bonanza (Ray Kubian). In September, the band launched a Kickstarter campaign to fund You're Welcome!, a double-album with one disc being a covers album – a sequel to Mimicry – and the second disc being a live album – a sequel to Absolute Pleasure. The live album contained the show recorded at the O2 Academy in Oxford on the 22nd of April 2017. You're Welcome! was released in September 2017.

In October 2017, Electric Six released its thirteenth studio album, How Dare You? In November, the band launched a Kickstarter campaign to fund production of a double album titled A Very Electric SiXmas and Chill Out! with the first disc being a Christmas studio album and the second disc a live album containing a set of stripped-down versions of the band's songs.

In July 2018, the band announced that its fourteenth studio album would be titled Bride of the Devil. It was released on October 5, 2018.

=== 2020s ===
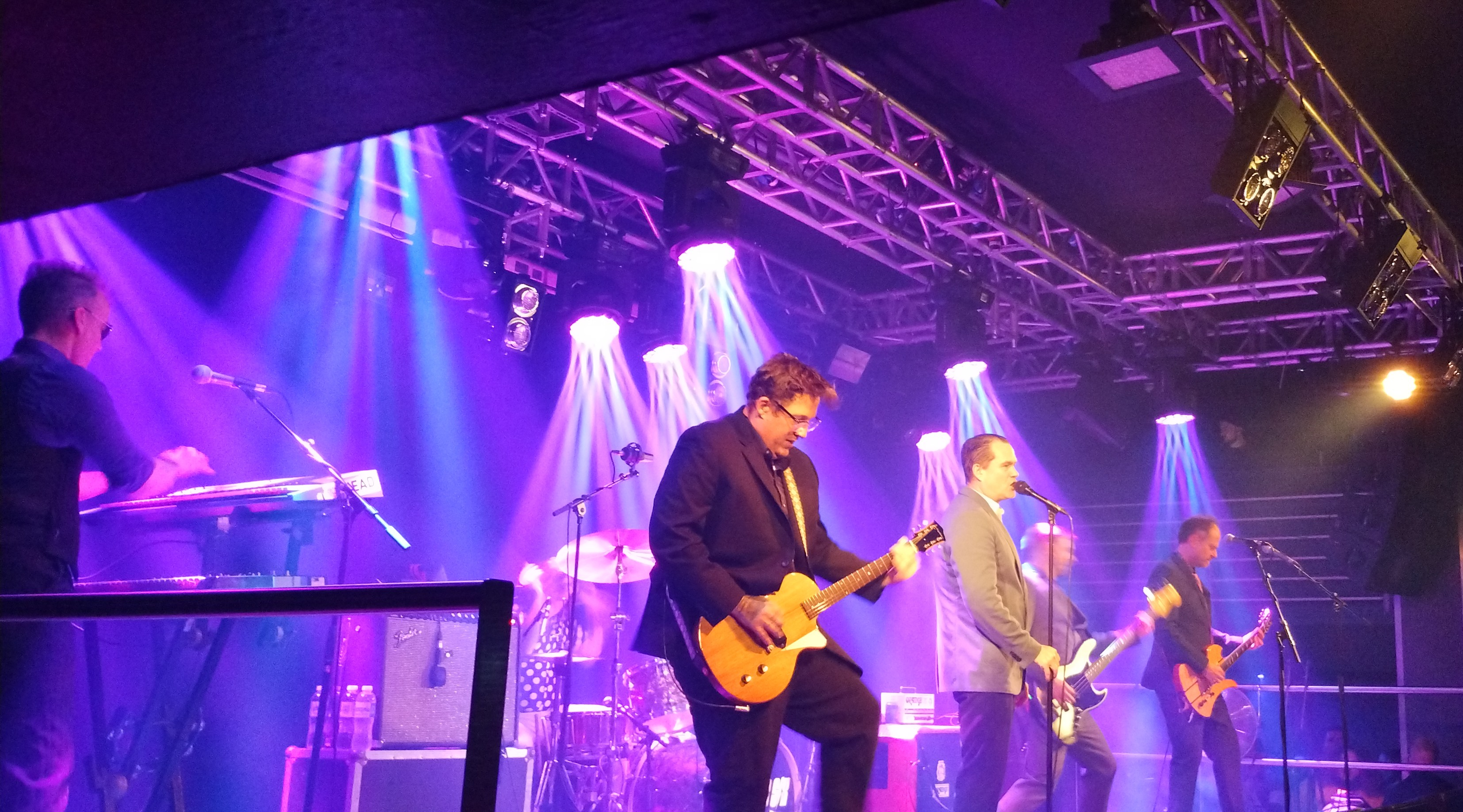
Electric Six performing in Edinburgh in November 2023 as part of the Fire 20th Anniversary Tour.

In 2021, Cleopatra Records issued an album of covers by Electric Six called Streets of Gold.

The band spent most of 2022 and 2023 touring North America and Europe.

In 2023, the band released Turquoise, Turquoise was their first album of new material since 2018's Bride of the Devil. Work on the album initially began in January 2020, but was interrupted by the Covid pandemic. Though Turquoise was completed in 2022, its release was held for a year to coincide with a U.S. tour.

Electric Six collaborated with Canadian synth-funk band TWRP on their single "VHS" in August 2023, with Valentine providing lead vocals.

The band completed a "Fire 20th Anniversary" tour of the United Kingdom in late 2023, followed by a "Greatest Hits" tour of Australia in mid 2024.

== Sound, style, and influences ==
Electric Six incorporates a variety of styles, resulting in being termed a "genre-blurring" band. The group's sound has been described as a synthesis of "disco, synth pop, glam, and arena rock", including the falsetto vocals of disco, laden with "rampant solos, be they guitar riffs, synth wails, or strutting drums" that enforce the band's "energetic sound". However, the band members themselves have rejected such genre classifications as "disco-metal" and "disco-punk".

Critics have termed their lyrics "disaffected, angry, ironic, and lustful", expressing "macho flippancy" and "tongue-in-cheek pomposity". Dick Valentine has estimated that "90% of [their] songs, maybe even higher" are "about absolutely nothing". Songs by Electric Six are often concerned with subjects such as sex, dancing, masculinity, hypersexuality, fast food, and fire; the band's official biography states that their debut album Fire was so named because they "noticed an abundance of the word fire on this record and decided to go with it".

Commenting on their usual lyrical material while promoting the band's album Switzerland, frontman Dick Valentine said, "For the first time, none of the songs have the word 'dance' or variation of 'dance' in the title. But fear not. We have songs with 'drugs' and 'girls' and 'tonight' and 'night' and 'louder' and 'party' in the title, so we haven't given up on our philosophy just yet."

Valentine cited Freddie Mercury, Talking Heads, Falco, Devo, and Captain Beefheart as his musical influences, as well as Black Sabbath, Queen, and Kiss for the rest of the group.

== Band members ==
Current members

- Dick Valentine – lead vocals (1999–present)
- Johnny "The White Wolf" Na$hinal – lead guitar, backing vocals (2003–present)
- Tait Nucleus? – keyboards, backing vocals (2003–present)
- Herb S. Flavorings – rhythm guitar (2022–present), bass (2020–2022)
- Dr. J – drums (2021–present)
- Mr. Poison (formerly Rick Schaple) – bass (2023–present, live 2022)

Touring members

- Clown Loudman – rhythm guitar (2023–2024)
- The Janitor – drums (2024–present)

Former members

- The Rock and Roll Indian – lead guitar (1999–2003)
- Surge Joebot – rhythm guitar (1999–2003)
- Disco – bass (1999–2003)
- M – drums (1999–2004)
- The Colonel – rhythm guitar (2003–2012)
- John R. Dequindre – bass (2004–2007)
- Percussion World – drums (2004–2016, 2021)
- Da Vé – rhythm guitar, backing vocals (2012–2023)
- Rob Lower – bass (2015–2020)
- Two-Handed Bob – drums (2016)
- Hyperkube Bonanza – drums, backing vocals (2016–2021)
- Smorgasbord – bass (2007–2015, 2023–2024)

== Discography ==
- Fire (2003)
- Señor Smoke (2005)
- Switzerland (2006)
- I Shall Exterminate Everything Around Me That Restricts Me from Being the Master (2007)
- Flashy (2008)
- Kill (2009)
- Zodiac (2010)
- Heartbeats and Brainwaves (2011)
- Mustang (2013)
- Human Zoo (2014)
- Mimicry and Memories (2015)
- Bitch, Don't Let Me Die! (2015)
- Roulette Stars of Metro Detroit (2016)
- Fresh Blood for Tired Vampyres (2016)
- You're Welcome! (2017)
- How Dare You? (2017)
- Bride of the Devil (2018)
- A Very Electric SiXmas (2018)
- Streets of Gold (2021)
- Turquoise (2023)

== Filmography ==
Year	Title	Director	Actors	Writer	Producers	Notes
2014	Absolute Pleasure	John Anderson	Dick Valentine, Tait Nucleus?, Johnny Na$hinal, Percussion World, Smörgåsbord, Da Ve	Tyler Spencer	Mel Caceres, Phil Crossland, Pat Divis, Sharon Iles, Peter Schofield & Niles Stanbery	A concert film of the band's performance at St. Andrews Hall in Detroit, Michigan on September 7, 2013.
2016	Roulette Stars of Metro Detroit	Tom Lehrer & Tom Nahas	Dick Valentine, Tait Nucleus?, Johnny Na$hinal, Percussion World & Da Ve	Tyler Spencer	Chris Fuller	A mockumentary film starring members of the band as fictional versions of themselves.
2019	Electric Six: Live in Liverpool	Tom Lehrer & Tom Nahas	Dick Valentine, Tait Nucleus?, Johnny Na$hinal, Percussion World & Da Ve	Tyler Spencer	Chris Fuller	A concert film of the band's performance in Liverpool, UK on the 18th of May, 2019 – funded and released via Kickstarter.
2020	Electric Six: Live from Quarantine	Tom Lehrer & Tom Nahas	Dick Valentine, Tait Nucleus?, Johnny Na$hinal, Percussion World & Da Ve	Tyler Spencer	Chris Fuller	A live-streamed concert film of the band performing a socially-distant set during the Coronavirus pandemic.
2020	Electric Six: Halloween Spooktacular	Tom Lehrer & Tom Nahas	Dick Valentine, Tait Nucleus?, Johnny Na$hinal, Percussion World & Da Ve	Tyler Spencer	Chris Fuller	A Halloween-themed concert film shot and broadcast live during the Coronavirus pandemic.
2020	It's the Most Wonderful Time...Of the Least Wonderful Year.	Tom Lehrer & Tom Nahas	Dick Valentine, Tait Nucleus?, Johnny Na$hinal, Percussion World & Da Ve	Tyler Spencer	Chris Fuller	A Christmas-themed concert film shot and broadcast live during the Coronavirus pandemic.
