= Heartbeats and Brainwaves =

Studio album by Electric Six
- Released: October 11, 2011
- Length: 53:08
- Label: Metropolis
- Producer: John Nash

Electric Six chronology
Zodiac (2010)	Heartbeats and Brainwaves (2011)	Mustang (2013) - Absolute Pleasure (2012)

Singles from Heartbeats and Brainwaves
- 1. "Interchangeable Knife (Dubai Bros. Remix)" / "French Bacon (Phantasmagoria Remix)" Released: 2011

Professional ratings
Review scores
Source	Rating
AllMusic	3.5/5 stars
Classic Rock	3.5/5 stars
PopMatters	5/10
Tom Hull – on the Web	B−

Heartbeats and Brainwaves is the eighth album by Detroit rock band Electric Six. It was released on October 11, 2011. It was released as a CD, digital download and a colored double vinyl set which is sold at the band's live shows.

A video for "Psychic Visions" starring Dick Valentine and directed by Justin J. Lowe was uploaded on April 30, 2012, marking the band's first video for three years.

== Production ==
The album was the first time that Johnny Na$hinal, the band's guitarist, produced one of their records. He would go on to produce every subsequent Electric Six album except for 2018's Bride of the Devil.

It made heavy use of the band's home studios for recording sessions. However, professional recording studios were still used, especially when recording the female backing vocals.

Unusually for the band (whose songs are typically written by Valentine), he asked each member of the band to submit at least two songs to the album, with some submitting three.

In an interview with St. Louis Magazine, Dick Valentine revealed that he wrote the album's opening track, "Psychic Visions", after seeing the words on a neon sign in Brooklyn. Speaking to Michigan Live, he stated that they tried not to overthink the album and revealed that the band wrote the song "Eye Contact" "in the span of like one hour".

== Track listing ==
All tracks are written by Tyler Spencer.

Heartbeats and Brainwaves track listing
No.	Title	Length
1.	"Psychic Visions"	3:39
2.	"French Bacon"	3:38
3.	"Gridlock!"	3:14
4.	"It Gets Hot"	3:51
5.	"The Intergalactic Version"	3:11
6.	"Interchangeable Knife"	2:32
7.	"Food Dog"	3:58
8.	"Hello! I See You!"	3:56
9.	"Bleed for the Artist"	3:35
10.	"We Use the Same Products"	3:57
11.	"Eye Contact"	4:13
12.	"Free Samples"	4:20
13.	"I Go Through Phases"	3:44
14.	"Heartbeats and Brainwaves"	5:00

== Personnel ==
- Dick Valentine – vocals
- Tait Nucleus? – synthesizer
- The Colonel – guitar
- Johnny Na$hinal – guitar
- Percussion World – drums
- Smorgasbord – bass
- Andy D. – vocals (track 4)
- E. Abbott Joñes – vocals (track 6)
- She Bits – background vocals (track 6)
- Adam Cox – musician
- Audrey Cichocki – musician
- Chad Thompson – musician
- Liz Whittman – musician
- Jason Pearce – musician
- Mark Mallman – musician
- Renata Del Signore – musician
