= Streets of Gold (Electric Six album) =

Compilation album by Electric Six
- Released: July 30, 2021
- Genre: Rock, pop, R&B, synth-pop, cover
- Label: Cleopatra Records

Electric Six chronology
A Very Electric SiXmas (2018)	Streets of Gold (2021)	Turquoise (2023)

Singles from Streets of Gold
- 1. "Yah Mo B There" Released: 2021

Streets of Gold is a 2021 album of cover songs by Electric Six.

The first single released from the album was a cover of the James Ingram and Michael McDonald R&B hit "Yah Mo B There".

Professional ratings
Review scores
Source	Rating
AllMusic	3/5 stars

== Reviews ==
Qro magazine wrote "While some of the artists aren’t so surprising, such as KISS, Alice Cooper, or even INXS, (they’ve covered INXS single “Never Tear Us Apart” live), there are also some that go more indie such as Pixies & Talking Heads, plus the likes of Roky Erickson and The Jam. And the songs chosen generally aren’t the career-making singles, save The Jam’s amazing “That’s Entertainment” & Alice Cooper’s “No More Mister Nice Guy”, but the tier below such as Pixies’ “Hey”, Talking Heads’ “Slippery”, and INXS’ “Don’t Change”. In general, the songs are more altered the further they are out of Electric Six’s wheelhouse, so not much for “Nice Guy”, but a funkified “Slippery”."

AllMusic said "Streets of Gold is competent and occasionally fun, but for a band built on crazy, this album is disappointingly sane and subdued. It's not the kind of party that will attract the police, and that's not what you want from the Electric Six."
