= How Dare You? (Electric Six album) =

Studio album by Electric Six
- Released: October 13, 2017
- Genre: Rock
- Length: 46:02
- Label: Metropolis
- Producer: Nash

Electric Six chronology
You're Welcome! (2017) - Fresh Blood for Tired Vampyres (2016)	How Dare You? (2017)	Bride of the Devil (2018)

How Dare You? is the sixteenth album by Detroit rock band Electric Six and the thirteenth in their official canon. It was released on October 13, 2017. It is their longest studio album to date. Although this is not technically true as their 2007 album, I Shall Exterminate Everything Around Me That Restricts Me from Being the Master, is longer at 50 minutes. A single of the song "Arrive Alive" was released ahead of the album as an incentive to pre-order it.

== Critical reception ==
Writing for AllMusic, Mark Deming called the album "Electric Six doing what they do best, with Dick Valentine's gloriously mannered vocals expounding on his myriad obsessions as the guitars, keys, and drums pop behind him like an exceptionally long string of firecrackers", awarding it 3 1/2 stars out of 5.

Steve Janes called it "the sound of a rock and roll band respecting its fans, giving them what we have to believe they want", stating that "How Dare You moves seamlessly from the bouncy and poppy numbers like 'Arrive Alive' and 'She's a Forgery' to the brooding and menacing 'Dark Politics' and the title track 'How Dare You'".

== Track listing ==
All lyrics written by Tyler Spencer.

How Dare You? track listing
No.	Title	Length
1.	"Chicken Wine"	2:27
2.	"Arrive Alive"	3:42
3.	"She's a Forgery"	2:49
4.	"The Hotel Mary Chang"	3:47
5.	"Sex With Somebody"	3:31
6.	"Dark Politics"	4:01
7.	"How Dare You?"	3:45
8.	"The Chimes of Titus"	3:38
9.	"The Loveliest Man in Town"	3:47
10.	"Hatchet Man"	4:24
11.	"Nightwaves"	2:33
12.	"Routine Cocooning"	3:52
13.	"A Quiet Man"	3:49

== Personnel ==
- Dick Valentine – vocals
- Johnny Na$hinal – lead guitar, music writer (tracks 1–2, 4, 8–9, 13)
- Da Vé – rhythm guitar
- Tait Nucleus? – keyboards, music writer (7, 9–12)
- Rob Lower – bass
- Todd Glass – drums
- Chris Krez – horns (track 4)
- Zach Shipps – drum production
