= Jason Paige =

American singer (born 1969)

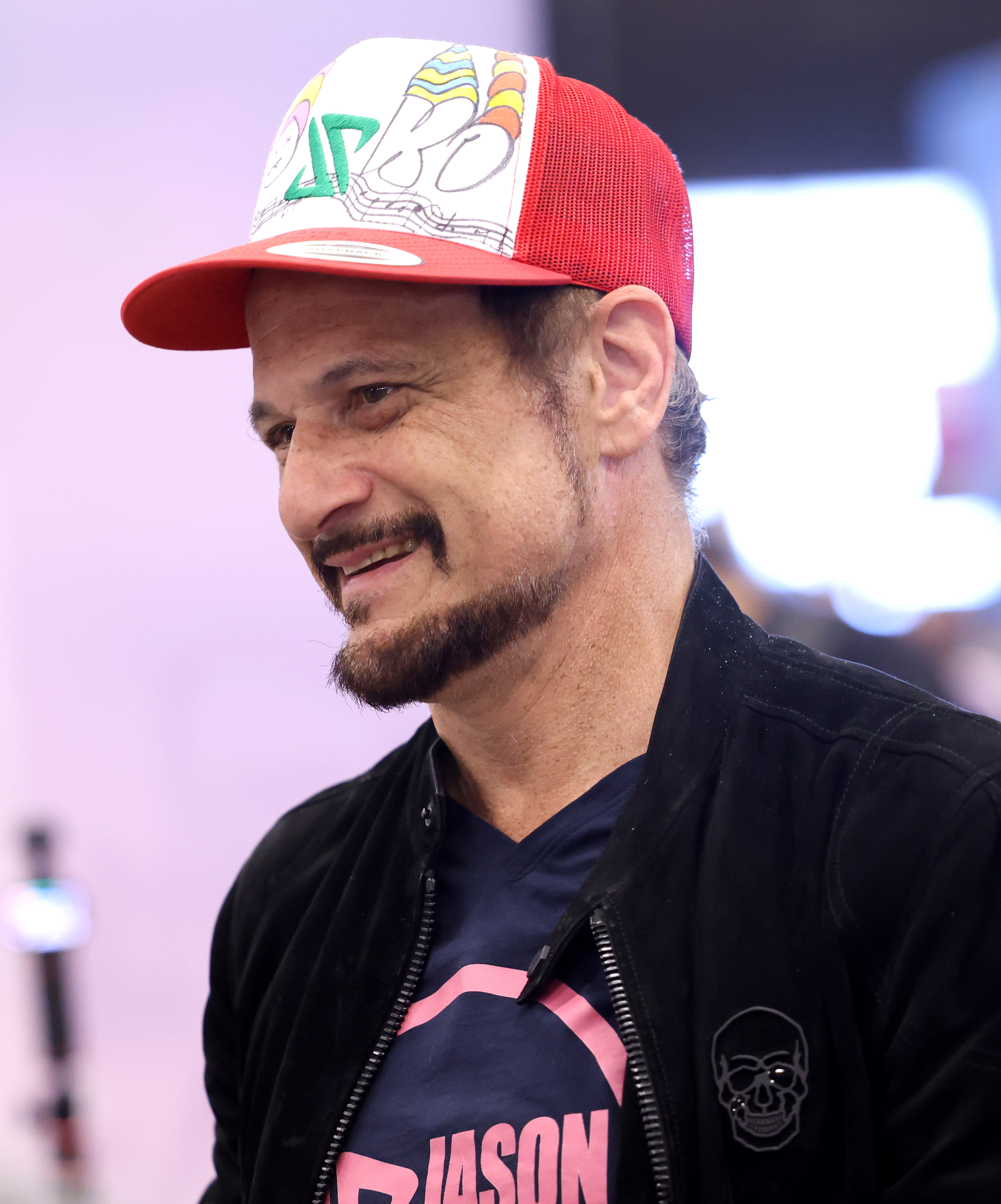
- Paige in 2026
- Born: January 6, 1969 (age 57); United States
- Education: New York University
- Occupations: Singer; writer; record producer; actor
- Website: jasonpaige.com

Jason Paige (born January 6, 1969) is an American singer, writer, record producer and actor. He sang the first theme song for the English dub of the Pokémon television series by 4Kids Entertainment.

== Early life and education ==
He is an alumnus of Fiorello H. LaGuardia High School and the Experimental Theatre Wing at New York University.

== Career ==
Paige is best known for singing the first theme song for the English version of the Pokémon anime. In an interview with the New York Post in 2016, Paige said he did not expect the song to become popular. In fact, he said that he "didn't really know much about Pokémon when [he] did the demo, other than [that] a scene in the cartoon caused a giant bout of epileptic seizures in Japan", referring to the infamous episode "Dennō Senshi Porygon", in which an extended period of flashing colors required hundreds of children to receive medical treatment.

He has sung and beat-boxed with Aerosmith on tour and on the Howard Stern re-mix of the hit single "Pink". His one-man show is filled with socio-political sexual musical parody, confessions and impersonations.

Paige has also lent his voice to video game soundtracks, such as Elite Beat Agents soundtrack, where he sings "Canned Heat" and "Walkie Talkie Man", and The Pink Panther: Passport to Peril, where he sings "Taj Mahal". He can also be heard on hundreds of various jingles, including Mountain Dew's "Bohemian Rhapsody" and Pepto-Bismol's "Nausea Heartburn Indigestion Diarrhea". He has written a number of songs for the TV series Rob & Big. His voice can also be heard in the Disney TV movie, The Color of Friendship, "The Jersey Boys", "Annie", and a couple characters in "Sausage Party".

He can be heard singing backgrounds on The Art of McCartney tribute CD behind Billy Joel, Roger Daltrey, Kiss, Smokey Robinson and others. He has also performed with famous artists such as Foreigner, The Scorpions, Meat Loaf, Frankie Valli, Liza Minnelli and Enrique Iglesias, Oleta Adams, among many others. He has written and produced for Shoshana Bean, Becky Baeling, Mike Weaver and Suzie McNeil.

As an actor, he can be seen as Peter in An Argentinian in New York, as a choir singer in A Walk to Remember, as the voice-over for Buttmeister in Meet the Spartans, as a medic in Make Yourself at Home, as a student in Election and as a parent in The Hustler. From 1995 to 2000, he produced and starred in his own musical comedy sketch show, The What's Up Show, which showed on Manhattan cable TV.

On the stage, he appeared in the 2010 production of Rent at the Hollywood Bowl, as Joe in Frank Zappa's Joe's Garage at the Open Fist Theatre Company, and as Travis in Ty Taylor's The Existents at the Open Fist Theatre Company. He has also done productions of The Who's Tommy, Godspell, Jesus Christ Superstar, and Hair. He has performed at Scott Nevins and Ryan O'Connor's Musical Mondays in Los Angeles, as well as Rockwell's For The Record series in the Coen Brothers, Baz Luhrmann, John Hughes, The Marshalls, Quentin Tarantino, Robert Zemeckis, Paul Thomas Anderson and Scorsese shows.

During the 2012 primary election, Paige himself sang a parody of the Pokémon Theme in support of the Republican candidate Ron Paul. In an interview with Spin Magazine in 2016, Paige said he was inspired by Paul's message of liberty. Later that year, Paige completed a year-long run as the lead singer for Blood, Sweat & Tears. He is a long time member of Broadway Inspirational Voices and has appeared at Mandalay Bay's LIGHT in For The Record Baz named after the director Baz Luhrmann.

In response to the massive popularity of the Pokémon Go mobile game, Paige re-recorded the theme during the height of the game's popularity in July 2016. Later that month, Paige sang another parody of the theme song featuring Dwayne Johnson as a Pokémon. He performed the song in Los Angeles as well.
