= Zodiac (Electric Six album) =

Studio album by Electric Six
- Released: September 28, 2010
- Genre: Indie rock; electronic rock
- Length: 48:29
- Label: Metropolis
- Producer: Zach Shipps

Electric Six chronology
Kill (2009)	Zodiac (2010)	Heartbeats and Brainwaves (2011)

Singles from Zodiac
- 1. "Jam It in the Hole" Released: September 2010

Professional ratings
Aggregate scores
Source	Rating
Metacritic	72/100
Review scores
Source	Rating
AllMusic	4/5 stars
Alternative Press	4/5 stars
Kerrang!	3/5 stars
PopMatters	7/10
Uncut	6/10

Zodiac is the seventh studio album by electronic rock band Electric Six. It was released in 2010 on Metropolis Records.

According to an official statement by the band, the songs on the album have been arranged to correspond with the signs of the Zodiac. The album contains a cover version of The Spinners 1976 classic "The Rubberband Man".

== Production ==
The album's title was inspired by the song "Typical Sagittarius", which the band wrote for the album, but chose not to include in the final cut. Other songs recorded but left off of the finished album include "I Can Translate" which was released as a B-Side on the limited "Jam It in the Hole" single and as a bonus track on European iTunes downloads of the album. The band also recorded a cover of "The Warrior" by Scandal which they originally planned to make available as a free internet download. It was ultimately included on their 2015 compilation album Mimicry and Memories.

Although the album cover was presumed by some to be a photo of lead singer Dick Valentine, it is in fact a stock photo that was licensed for use as the album cover.

== Track listing ==
All tracks are written by Tyler Spencer, except "The Rubberband Man" by Thom Bell and Linda Creed.

Track Listing
No.	Title	Length
1.	"After Hours"	2:22
2.	"American Cheese"	4:20
3.	"Clusterfuck!"	4:36
4.	"Countdown to the Countdown"	3:08
5.	"Doom and Gloom and Doom and Gloom"	5:23
6.	"Jam It in the Hole"	3:51
7.	"I Am a Song!"	3:44
8.	"It Ain't Punk Rock"	3:58
9.	"Love Song for Myself"	4:20
10.	"The Rubberband Man"	3:50
11.	"Table and Chairs"	4:36
12.	"Talking Turkey"	4:20

A bonus edition was released online via iTunes and Amazon download.

Bonus edition
No.	Title	Length
13.	"I Can Translate"	2:43

== Personnel ==
- Dick Valentine – vocals
- Tait Nucleus? – synthesizer
- The Colonel – guitar
- Johnny Na$hinal – guitar
- Percussion World – drums
- Smörgåsbord – bass
- Timothy Monger – accordion, fiddle (track 1)
- Dave Malosh (joined band as rhythm guitarist “Da Vé” from 2012-2023) – harp (track 1), guitar (track 2)
- Christian Doble – saxophone (tracks 2, 5, 6, 10)
- Amy Gay – background vocals (tracks 3, 7)
- Jesse "Boots Electric" Hughes – background vocals (track 3)
- Kristin von B. – background vocals (tracks 3, 6, 12)
- Jaxxon Smith – guitar (track 3)
- John R. Dequindre – turntables (tracks 3, 12)
- Aja Sardis – background vocals (track 5)
- Ron Zakrin – synthesizer (tracks 6, 8)
- Reuben Wu – synthesizer, hihat (track 9)
- Matthew Smith – background vocals (track 10)
- Fred Thomas – background vocals (track 11)
