= Fresh Blood for Tired Vampyres =

Studio album by Electric Six
- Released: October 7, 2016
- Genre: Rock music, electro
- Label: Metropolis Records

Electric Six chronology
Bitch, Don't Let Me Die! (2015)	Fresh Blood for Tired Vampyres (2016)	How Dare You? (2017)

Fresh Blood For Tired Vampyres is a 2016 rock album by Electric Six.

Professional ratings
Review scores
Source	Rating
AllMusic	3.5/5 stars

== Reviews ==
Louder said "You’ve gotta hand it to the Six, they went all in on this funky new wave retro bullshit trip of theirs, and if you don’t miss the stabby hard-rock riffs of their Gay Bar days, Vampyres has plenty of pleasantly goofy soda-pop-sipping hits on deck, from the breakdancey Number Of The Beast to the audaciously phony R&B of Mood Is Improving to the yard-sale-synth Prince-isms of Dance With Dark Forces. This might already seem like a bad idea, but it works in short spurts."

ReGen magazine wrote "There’s always something for everyone when it comes to Electric Six. The band has proven a mastery of creating mixed-genre songs that often surprise listeners with how they twist and turn. Overall, Fresh Blood for Tired Vampyres captures the essential spirit at the core of Electric Six at its peak, while sounding modern and fresh despite the love for ‘70s and ‘80s influences. A few tunes toward the second half of the album meld together a bit, but otherwise, this is a really fun party album that will get listeners dancing their asses off and laughing with the clever lyrics."

AllMusic wrote "Fresh Blood for Tired Vampyres is a rather remarkable feat when one recalls that most of their contemporaries from the brief moment when Detroit was the center of the indie rock universe aren't even together anymore. Electric Six can still make albums that show they have life left in them, and as someone once said, partying well is the best revenge."
