= List of Billboard Best-Selling Popular Record Albums number ones of 1946 =

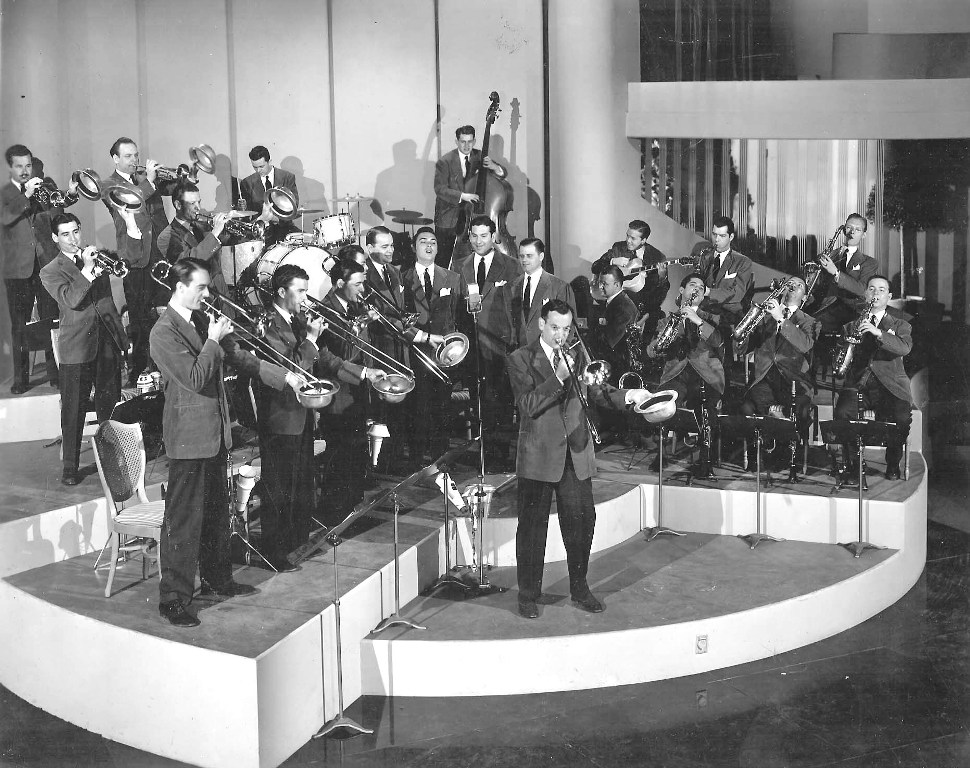
The compilation album Glenn Miller by Glenn Miller's Orchestra (pictured in 1941) was the bestselling album of 1946.

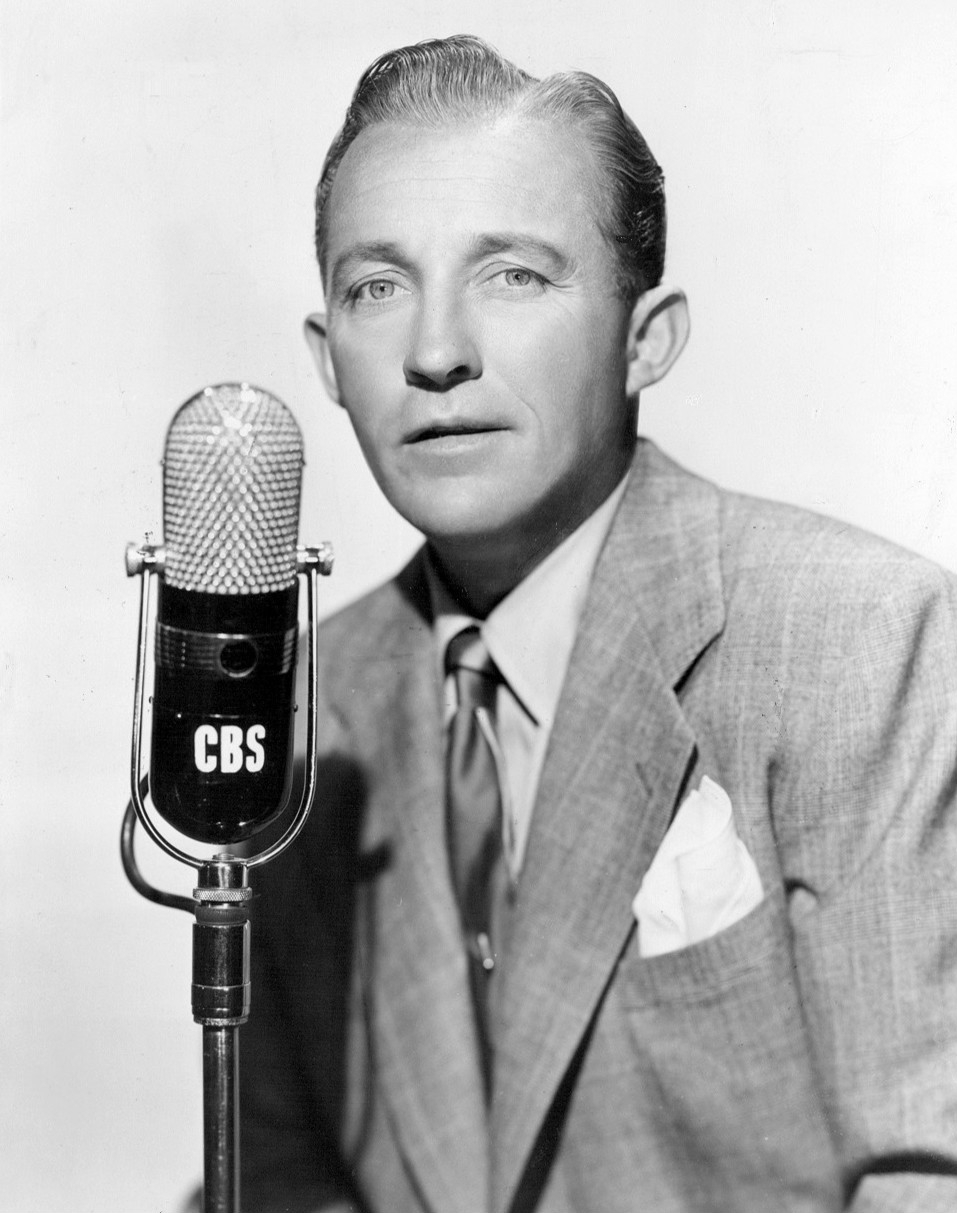
Bing Crosby (pictured in 1951) was the only artist with two albums atop the chart: Merry Christmas and Selections from The Bells of St. Mary's for a total of ten weeks. Furthermore, Merry Christmas was the longest-reigning album with eight weeks.

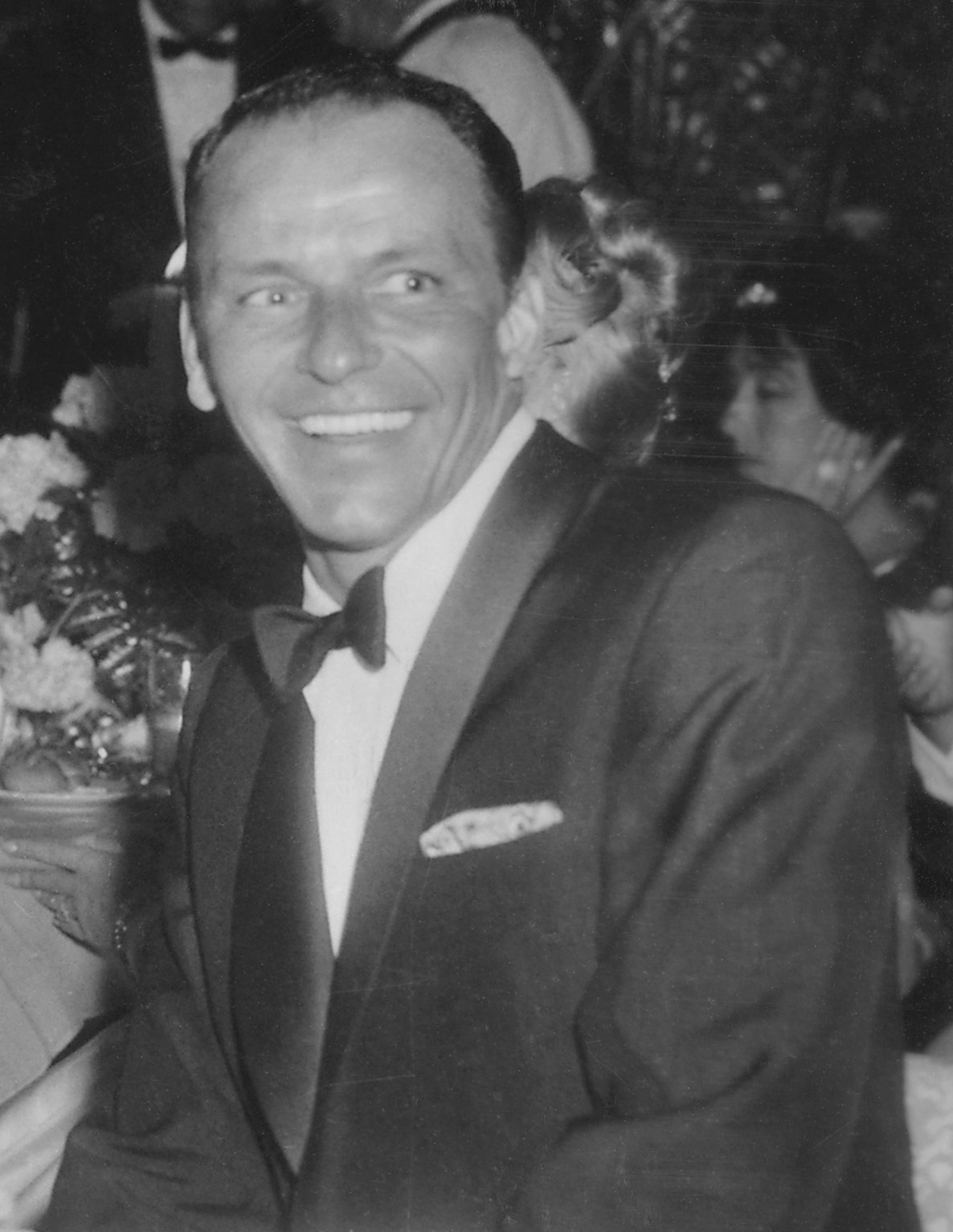
Frank Sinatra's (pictured in 1960) The Voice of Frank Sinatra was the second-longest reigning album atop the chart with seven weeks.

The Billboard magazine publishes a weekly chart that ranks the bestselling albums in the United States. In 1946, twelve albums by eleven artists topped the chart. At the time, the chart was titled Best-Selling Popular Record Albums, and it collected sales data from United States–based record dealers, numbering at least 200 in January and increasing to over 4,000 by the end of the year. In 1946, all phonograph records were 78 rpm records that held one recording per side. An album consisted of multiple records, each in a separate sleeve, the sleeves bound together along one edge within two stiff pasteboard covers, much like a traditional photograph album.

The first album atop the chart in 1946 was Merry Christmas, a Christmas compilation album by Bing Crosby, released by Decca. It reached the top in December 1945, and it peaked for two more weeks in January 1946, for a total of six consecutive weeks at number one. It again reached the top in late November for an additional six weeks, making it the longest reigning album of the year. The album was certified gold 25 years after its release by the Recording Industry Association of America (RIAA) for shipments of 500,000 or more units. Crosby placed a second album atop the listing with the soundtrack to the movie The Bells of St. Mary's in March, bringing his total weeks spent at number one to ten.

Following numerous single releases in the early 1940s, Frank Sinatra released his debut studio album The Voice of Frank Sinatra in March 1946. The album topped the chart for seven consecutive weeks in April and May—the second-longest reigning album in 1946. The second longest-reigning album of the previous year, Glenn Miller, recorded by Glenn Miller & His Orchestra, again reached the top for an additional five weeks. The album was later crowned as the bestselling album of the year and certified gold by the RIAA in 1968. The Ink Spots' eponymous album reached the top in late September and topped the chart without interruption until mid-November, making it the second-longest reigning album of the year, alongside Sinatra's.

== Chart history ==
Key
†	Indicates best selling album of 1946

Issue date	Album	Artist(s)	Ref.
January 5	Merry Christmas	Bing Crosby	
January 12	Merry Christmas	Bing Crosby	
January 19	On the Moonbeam	Vaughn Monroe	
January 26	On the Moonbeam	Vaughn Monroe	
February 2	On the Moonbeam	Vaughn Monroe	
February 9	On the Moonbeam	Vaughn Monroe	
February 16	On the Moonbeam	Vaughn Monroe	
February 23	State Fair	Dick Haymes	
March 2	State Fair	Dick Haymes	
March 9	State Fair	Dick Haymes	
March 16	State Fair	Dick Haymes	
March 23	Selections from The Bells of St. Mary's	Bing Crosby	
March 30	Selections from The Bells of St. Mary's	Bing Crosby	
April 6	The Voice of Frank Sinatra	Frank Sinatra	
April 13	The Voice of Frank Sinatra	Frank Sinatra	
April 20	The Voice of Frank Sinatra	Frank Sinatra	
April 27	The Voice of Frank Sinatra	Frank Sinatra	
May 4	The Voice of Frank Sinatra	Frank Sinatra	
May 11	The Voice of Frank Sinatra	Frank Sinatra	
May 18	The Voice of Frank Sinatra	Frank Sinatra	
May 25	Benny Goodman Sextet	Benny Goodman Sextet	
June 1	Benny Goodman Sextet	Benny Goodman Sextet	
June 8	Glenn Miller †	Glenn Miller & His Orchestra	
June 15	Benny Goodman Sextet	Benny Goodman Sextet	
June 22	Glenn Miller †	Glenn Miller & His Orchestra	
June 29	Glenn Miller †	Glenn Miller & His Orchestra	
July 6	Glenn Miller †	Glenn Miller & His Orchestra	
July 13	Glenn Miller †	Glenn Miller & His Orchestra	
July 20	Dancing in the Dark	Carmen Cavallaro	
July 27	Dancing in the Dark	Carmen Cavallaro	
August 3	Dancing in the Dark	Carmen Cavallaro	
August 10	Dancing in the Dark	Carmen Cavallaro	
August 17	King Cole Trio, Volume 2	King Cole Trio	
August 24	King Cole Trio, Volume 2	King Cole Trio	
August 31	A Cole Porter Review	David Rose & His Orchestra	
September 7	A Cole Porter Review	David Rose & His Orchestra	
September 14	King Cole Trio, Volume 2	King Cole Trio	
September 21	King Cole Trio, Volume 2	King Cole Trio	
September 28	Ink Spots	Ink Spots	
October 5	Ink Spots	Ink Spots	
October 12	Ink Spots	Ink Spots	
October 19	Ink Spots	Ink Spots	
October 26	Ink Spots	Ink Spots	
November 2	Ink Spots	Ink Spots	
November 9	Ink Spots	Ink Spots	
November 16	Merry Christmas Music	Perry Como	
November 23	Merry Christmas	Bing Crosby	
November 30	Merry Christmas	Bing Crosby	
December 7	Merry Christmas	Bing Crosby	
December 14	Merry Christmas	Bing Crosby	
December 21	Merry Christmas	Bing Crosby	
December 28	Merry Christmas	Bing Crosby	

== See also ==
- 1946 in music
- List of Billboard 200 number-one albums
