= Deep in the Heart of Texas (disambiguation) =

"Deep in the Heart of Texas" is an American popular song about Texas.

Deep in the Heart of Texas may also refer to:

- Deep in the Heart of Texas (film), a black-and-white western released in 1943
- "Deep in the Heart of Texas", an episode from the tenth season of the ABC program, What Would You Do?
