= List of Billboard Best-Selling Popular Record Albums number ones of 1945 =

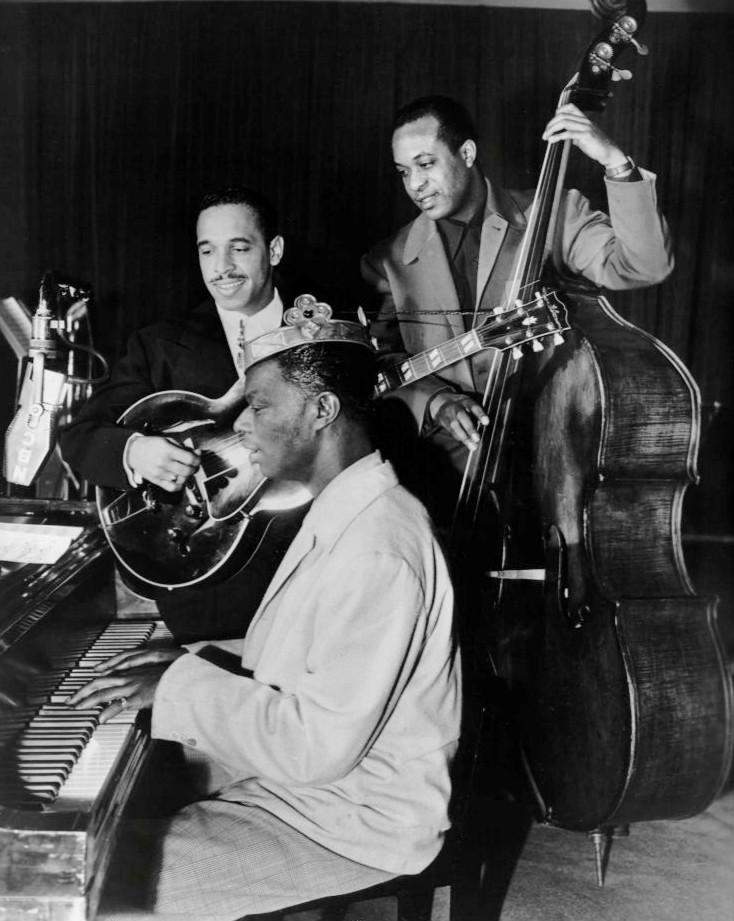
The King Cole Trio (pictured in 1947) had the first number-one album of the chart with their self-titled album. Furthermore, it was the longest reigning album on the chart with 12 non-consecutive weeks.

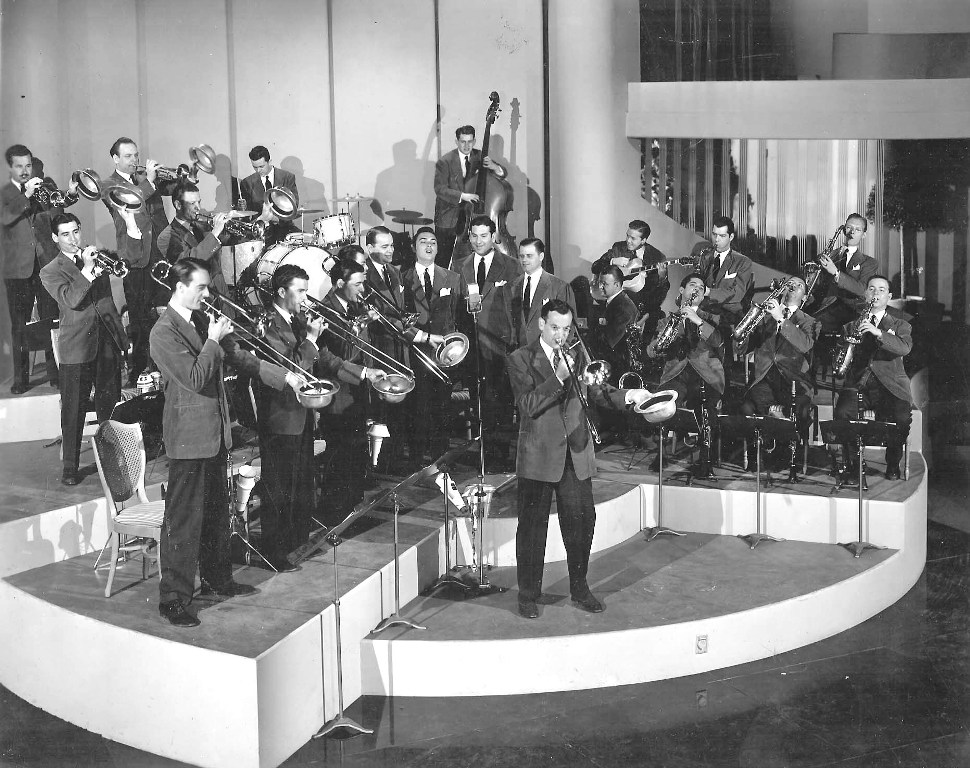
The compilation album Glenn Miller by Glenn Miller's Orchestra (pictured in 1941) topped the charts for a total of eight weeks during the year.

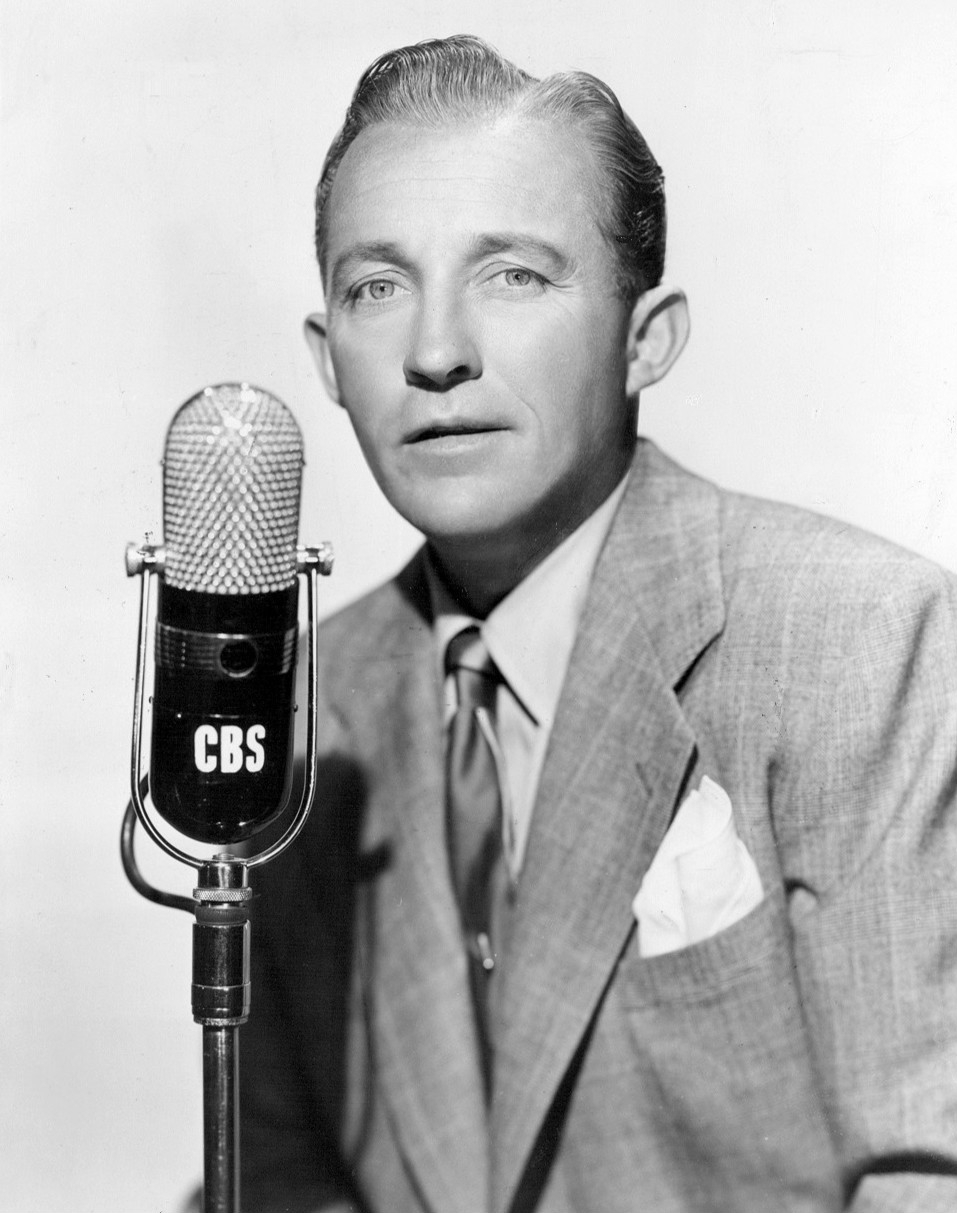
Bing Crosby (pictured in 1951) was the only solo artist with two albums atop the chart.

Billboard published its first popular albums chart, at the time known as Best-Selling Popular Record Albums, in 1945. The chart was first published in the magazine dated March 24 and included ten positions, "based on reports received from more than 200 dealers" throughout the United States. In the 40 weeks that followed, eight albums by five different artists reached the top. (Note: Excluding the casts of Song of Norway and Carousel.)

The first number-one album on the chart was the King Cole Trio's self-titled debut released by Capitol. It topped the charts for three weeks until it was replaced by the soundtrack of Song of Norway, an operetta, written by Robert Wright and George Forrest. The soundtrack reached number one for one more week in May. Glenn Miller, a compilation album recorded by Glenn Miller and His Orchestra released posthumously by Victor, topped the charts for two weeks in May and later in summer for an additional six weeks. The album was certified gold 23 years after its release by the Recording Industry Association of America (RIAA) for shipments of 500,000 or more units.

The second album credited to an original cast to top the chart was Carousel, an original cast album released by Decca. The musical was composed by Rodgers and Hammerstein and was atop for six consecutive weeks in August and September. Bing Crosby was the only artist to have two albums atop the chart: Selections from Going My Way for six weeks and Merry Christmas for four weeks. The latter album was certified gold by the RIAA in November 1970. The King Cole Trio was the longest reigning album of the year with 12 weeks at number one, followed by Glenn Miller with seven weeks. Albums released by Decca topped the charts for a total of 18 weeks, followed by Capitol at 17 weeks and Victor for 9 weeks.

== Chart history ==
Issue date	Album	Artist(s)	Ref.
March 24	The King Cole Trio	The King Cole Trio	
March 31	The King Cole Trio	The King Cole Trio	
April 7	The King Cole Trio	The King Cole Trio	
April 14	Song of Norway	Original cast	
April 21	The King Cole Trio	The King Cole Trio	
April 28	The King Cole Trio	The King Cole Trio	
May 5	Song of Norway	Original cast	
May 12	Glenn Miller	Glenn Miller & His Orchestra	
May 19 (Note: Multiple albums tied for the number one position.)	Glenn Miller	Glenn Miller & His Orchestra	
May 19	The King Cole Trio	The King Cole Trio	
May 26	The King Cole Trio	The King Cole Trio	
June 2	The King Cole Trio	The King Cole Trio	
June 9	The King Cole Trio	The King Cole Trio	
June 16	The King Cole Trio	The King Cole Trio	
June 23	The King Cole Trio	The King Cole Trio	
June 30	Glenn Miller	Glenn Miller & His Orchestra	
July 7	Glenn Miller	Glenn Miller & His Orchestra	
July 14	Glenn Miller	Glenn Miller & His Orchestra	
July 21	Glenn Miller	Glenn Miller & His Orchestra	
July 28	Glenn Miller	Glenn Miller & His Orchestra	
August 4	The King Cole Trio	The King Cole Trio	
August 11	Glenn Miller	Glenn Miller & His Orchestra	
August 11	Carousel	Original cast	
August 18	Carousel	Original cast	
August 25	Carousel	Original cast	
September 1	Carousel	Original cast	
September 8	Carousel	Original cast	
September 15	Carousel	Original cast	
September 15	Boogie Woogie	Freddie Slack	
September 22	Boogie Woogie	Freddie Slack	
September 29	Boogie Woogie	Freddie Slack	
October 6	Boogie Woogie	Freddie Slack	
October 13	Boogie Woogie	Freddie Slack	
October 20	Selections from Going My Way	Bing Crosby	
October 27	Selections from Going My Way	Bing Crosby	
November 3	Selections from Going My Way	Bing Crosby	
November 10	Selections from Going My Way	Bing Crosby	
November 17	Selections from Going My Way	Bing Crosby	
November 24	Selections from Going My Way	Bing Crosby	
December 1	On the Moonbeam	Vaughn Monroe	
December 8	Merry Christmas	Bing Crosby	
December 15	Merry Christmas	Bing Crosby	
December 22	Merry Christmas	Bing Crosby	
December 29	Merry Christmas	Bing Crosby	

== See also ==
- 1945 in music
- List of Billboard 200 number-one albums
