= State Fair (album) =

Selections from Rogers and Hammerstein's "State Fair"

Studio album by Dick Haymes
- Released: 1946
- Genre: Show tunes
- Label: Decca

Selections from Rogers and Hammerstein's "State Fair", or simply State Fair, is a studio album by Dick Haymes featuring songs from the 1945 film State Fair that he starred in. The album was released by Decca Records in 1946.

== Background ==
As Joel Whitburn explains in his book Joel Whitburn's Billboard Pop Hits, Singles & Albums, 1940–1954, "although Haymes starred in the movie State Fair, this album is not from the movie soundtrack" and was recorded specifically for Decca.

== Release ==
The album was released as a set of three 10-inch 78-rpm phonograph records (cat. no. A-412).

== Reception ==
The album spent four consecutive weeks at number one on Billboard's Best-Selling Popular Record Albums chart in February–March 1946.

== Track listing ==
Set of three 10-inch 78-rpm records (Decca A-412)

Side 1
No.	Title	Writer(s)	Orchestra director	Length
1.	"That's for Me"	Richard Rodgers—Oscar Hammerstein II	Victor Young

Side 2
No.	Title	Writer(s)	Orchestra director	Length
1.	"It Might as Well Be Spring"	Richard Rodgers—Oscar Hammerstein II	Victor Young

Side 3
No.	Title	Writer(s)	Orchestra director	Length
1.	"Isn't It Kind of Fun"	Richard Rodgers—Oscar Hammerstein II	Victor Young

Side 4
No.	Title	Writer(s)	Orchestra director	Length
1.	"The Lord's Been Good to Me"	Sam H. Stept	Lyn Murray

Side 5
No.	Title	Writer(s)	Orchestra director	Length
1.	"It's a Grand Night for Singing"	Richard Rodgers—Oscar Hammerstein II	Earle Hagen

Side 6
No.	Title	Writer(s)	Orchestra director	Length
1.	"All I Owe Ioway"	Richard Rodgers—Oscar Hammerstein II	Earle Hagen

== Charts ==
Chart (1946)	Peak position
US Billboard Best-Selling Popular Record Albums	1

== See also ==
- List of Billboard Best-Selling Popular Record Albums number ones of 1946
