= The Eddy Duchin Story (soundtrack) =

Soundtrack album by Carmen Cavallaro
- Released: 1956
- Label: Decca

The original soundtrack to the 1956 Columbia film The Eddy Duchin Story was released by Decca Records.

== Release ==
The album was released as a 12-inch LP (Decca DL 8289) and as a set of three 7-inch 45-rpm EPs (Decca ED 844).

== Critical reception ==
Professional ratings
Review scores
Source	Rating
Billboard	positive ("Spotlight" pick)

Billboard reviewed the LP in its issue from 28 April 1956, describing it as follows: "The LP spotlights Carmen Cavallaro, who impersonates Duchin on the soundtrack, while Tyrone Power fakes the keyboard work on screen. Cavallaro plays a group of nostalgic standards [...] popularized by the late society bandleader in a frothy, sophisticated style." The magazine was very positive on the LP's sales potential: "There are plenty of packages designed to cash in on Columbia's forthcoming bio-musical, 'The Eddy Duchin Story,' [...] but the soundtrack version should grab off the major share of spins and sales."

== Chart performance ==
The album peaked at number 1 on Billboard's Best Selling Pop Albums and Pop Instrumentals charts. It finished 1956 as the fourth best-selling album of the year in the United States according to the magazine.

== Track listing ==
12-inch LP (Decca DL 8289)

Side 1
No.	Title	Writer(s)	Length
1.	"To Love Again" (Main Title)	Chopin, Sidney, Stoloff, Washington
2.	"Manhattan"	Rodgers–Hart
3.	"Shine On Harvest Moon"	Norworth, Bayes
4.	"It Must Be True"	Clifford, Arnheim, Barris
5.	"Whispering"	Schonberger, Coburn, Rose
6.	"Dizzy Fingers"	Confrey

Side 2
No.	Title	Writer(s)	Length
1.	"You're My Everything"	Warren, Young, Dixon
2.	"Chopsticks"
3.	"On the Sunny Side of the Street"	McHugh–Fields
4.	"Brazil (Aquarela do Brasil)"	Barroso
5.	"La Vie en rose"	Piaf, Louiguy
6.	"To Love Again" (Finale)	Chopin, Sidney, Stoloff, Washington

== Charts ==
=== Weekly charts ===
Chart (1956)	Peak position
US Billboard Best Selling Pop Albums	1
US Billboard Pop Instrumentals	1

=== Year-end charts ===
Chart (1956)	Position
US Billboard	4
