= Boogie Woogie (Freddie Slack album) =

Studio album by Freddie Slack
- Released: 1945
- Label: Capitol

Freddie Slack's Boogie-Woogie Album, or simply Boogie Woogie, is an album of phonograph records by American pianist Freddie Slack, released in 1945 on Capitol Records.

== Release ==
The album was originally released as a set of four 10-inch 78-rpm phonograph records (cat. no. BD 12).

== Reception ==
The album spent several weeks at number one on Billboard's Best-Selling Popular Record Albums chart in September–October 1945.

== Track listing ==
=== Disc 1 (cat. no. 20029) ===
371-2A2
No.	Title	Artist(s)	Length
1.	"Rib Joint" (Freddie Slack)	Freddie Slack's Eight Beats by Four; Freddie Slack, piano; Remo Palmieri, guitar; Clyde Lombardi, bass; Irving Kluger, drums

372-2A1
No.	Title	Writer(s)	Artist(s)	Length
1.	"Behind the Eight Beat"	Freddie Slack	Freddie Slack's Eight Beats by Four; Freddie Slack, piano; Remo Palmieri, guitar; Clyde Lombardi, bass; Irving Kluger, drums

=== Disc 2 (cat. no. 20030) ===
N-379-3A1
No.	Title	Writer(s)	Artist(s)	Length
1.	"Strange Cargo" (Theme song)	Slack; Bradley; McKinley	Freddie Slack and his orchestra

377-3A1
No.	Title	Writer(s)	Artist(s)	Length
1.	"Southpaw Serenade"	Freddie Slack	Freddie Slack and his orchestra

=== Disc 3 (cat. no. 20031) ===
369-2A1
No.	Title	Writer(s)	Artist(s)	Length
1.	"A Cat's Ninth Life"	Freddie Slack	Freddie Slack's Eight Beats by Four; Freddie Slack, piano; Remo Palmieri, guitar; Clyde Lombardi, bass; Irving Kluger, drums

380-4A1
No.	Title	Writer(s)	Artist(s)	Length
1.	"Blackout Boogie"	Freddie Slack	Freddie Slack; Irving Kluger, drums

=== Disc 4 (cat. no. 20032) ===
253-4A
No.	Title	Writer(s)	Artist(s)	Length
1.	"Bashful Baby Blues"	Phil Moore	Freddie Slack and his orchestra

N-378-3A1
No.	Title	Writer(s)	Artist(s)	Length
1.	"Kitten on the Keys"	Zez Confrey	Freddie Slack and his orchestra

== Charts ==
Chart (1945)	Peak position
US Billboard Best-Selling Popular Record Albums	1

== See also ==
- List of Billboard Best-Selling Popular Record Albums number ones of 1945
