= A Cole Porter Review =

Studio album by David Rose and His Orchestra
- Released: 1946
- Label: RCA Victor

A Cole Porter Review is a studio album by David Rose and His Orchestra, released by RCA Victor in 1946.

== Release ==
The album was released as a set of four 10-inch 78-rpm phonograph records (cat. no. P 158).

== Reception ==
Professional ratings
Review scores
Source	Rating
Billboard	positive

The 1946 version spent two consecutive weeks at number one on Billboard's Best-Selling Popular Record Albums chart in August–September 1946.

== Track listing ==
Set of four 10-inch 78-rpm records (Decca P 158)

All tracks are written by Cole Porter.

Side 1
No.	Title	Length
1.	"What Is This Thing Called Love"

Side 2
No.	Title	Length
1.	"I've Got You Under My Skin"

Side 3
No.	Title	Length
1.	"Begin the Beguine"

Side 4
No.	Title	Length
1.	"Love for Sale"

Side 5
No.	Title	Length
1.	"Night and Day"

Side 6
No.	Title	Length
1.	"Easy to Love"

Side 7
No.	Title	Length
1.	"I Get a Kick Out of You"

Side 8
No.	Title	Length
1.	"In the Still of the Night"

== Charts ==
Chart (1946)	Peak position
US Billboard Best-Selling Popular Record Albums	1

== See also ==
- List of Billboard Best-Selling Popular Record Albums number ones of 1946
