= Al Kavelin =

Al Kavelin (March 3, 1903 – January 1982) was a highly influential bandleader of the 1930s. Noticeable achievements are including Carmen Cavallaro in his band.

Al Kavelin was born in Minsk in the Russian Empire, and came to Denver, Colorado, at the age of seven, with his family. He was a graduate of the Royal Verdi Conservatory in Milan, Italy. During the 1930s, at the urging of Eddy Duchin, Kavelin organized a similar orchestra to replace Duchin at the Central Park Casino, including Carmen Cavallero on the piano. The orchestra played coast-to-coast over the years at such spots as the Waldorf-Astoria, the Essex House, and the Biltmore in New York, the Blackstone in Chicago and the Mark Hopkins in San Francisco.

Kavelin was a Jehovah's Witness and served in a 1963 Jehovah's Witness convention orchestra. He preached to Benny Golson, another musician who joined Jehovah's Witnesses later.
