= Dancing in the Dark (Carmen Cavallaro album) =

- 1939 cover

Studio album by Carmen Cavallaro
- Released: 1939; 1946
- Label: Decca

Dancing in the Dark is a studio album by American pianist Carmen Cavallaro, originally released on Decca Records in 1939 and re-released in a newly re-recorded version in 1946.

Both the 1939 (cat. no. 122) and the 1946 (cat. no. A-441) versions included five 10-inch 78-rpm phonograph records.

== Reception ==
Professional ratings
Review scores
Source	Rating
Billboard	positive (1946 ver.)

The 1946 version spent four consecutive weeks at number one on Billboard's Best-Selling Popular Record Albums chart in July–August 1946.

== Track listing ==
=== 1939 version ===
Set of five 10-inch 78-rpm records (Decca 122)

Side 1
No.	Title	Writer(s)	Length
1.	"Cocktails for Two"	Arthur Johnston—Sam Coslow

Side 2
No.	Title	Writer(s)	Length
1.	"The Very Thought of You"	Ray Noble

Side 3
No.	Title	Writer(s)	Length
1.	"If I Had You"	Ted Shapiro—Jimmy Campbell—Reg. Connelly

Side 4
No.	Title	Writer(s)	Length
1.	"Smoke Gets in Your Eyes"	Jerome Kern—Otto Harbach

Side 5
No.	Title	Writer(s)	Length
1.	"Dancing in the Dark"	Arthur Schwartz—Howard Dietz

Side 6
No.	Title	Writer(s)	Length
1.	"Lover"	Richard Rodgers—Lorenz Hart

Side 7
No.	Title	Writer(s)	Length
1.	"Body and Soul"	Green—Heyman—Sour—Eyton

Side 8
No.	Title	Writer(s)	Length
1.	"You're Mine, You!"	John W. Green—Edward Heyman

Side 9
No.	Title	Writer(s)	Length
1.	"Night and Day"	Cole Porter

Side 10
No.	Title	Writer(s)	Length
1.	"Alone Together"	Howard Dietz—Arthur Schwartz

=== 1946 version ===
Set of five 10-inch 78-rpm records (Decca A-441)

Side 1
No.	Title	Writer(s)	Length
1.	"Cocktails for Two"	Arthur Johnston—Sam Coslow

Side 2
No.	Title	Writer(s)	Length
1.	"The Very Thought of You"	Ray Noble

Side 3
No.	Title	Writer(s)	Length
1.	"If I Had You"	T. Shapiro—J. Campbell—R. Connelly

Side 4
No.	Title	Writer(s)	Length
1.	"Smoke Gets in Your Eyes"	Jerome Kern—Otto Harbach

Side 5
No.	Title	Writer(s)	Length
1.	"Dancing in the Dark"	Arthur Schwartz—Howard Dietz

Side 6
No.	Title	Writer(s)	Length
1.	"Lover"	Richard Rodgers—Lorenz Hart

Side 7
No.	Title	Writer(s)	Length
1.	"Body and Soul"	J. Green—E. Heyman—R. Sour—F. Eyton

Side 8
No.	Title	Writer(s)	Length
1.	"You're Mine, You!"	John W. Green—Edward Heyman

Side 9
No.	Title	Writer(s)	Length
1.	"Alone Together"	Arthur Schwartz—Howard Dietz

Side 10
No.	Title	Writer(s)	Length
1.	"Night and Day"	Cole Porter

== Charts ==
Chart (1946)	Peak position
US Billboard Best-Selling Popular Record Albums	1

== See also ==
- List of Billboard Best-Selling Popular Record Albums number ones of 1946
