= On the Moon-Beam =

Studio album by Vaughn Monroe
- Released: 1945
- Label: RCA Victor

Vaughn Monroe chronology
On the Moon-Beam (1945)	Vaughn Monroe's Dreamland (1946)

Professional ratings
On the Moonbeam / Down Memory Lane (CD, 2000)
Review scores
Source	Rating
AllMusic	4/5 stars

On the Moon-Beam, alternatively spelled On the Moonbeam, is a 1945 studio album by American singer Vaughn Monroe, the first of his albums released on RCA Victor.

== Content ==
The album collects songs about the moon.

== Release ==
The album was originally released as a set of five 10-inch 78-rpm phonograph records (cat. no. P-234).

== Reception ==
The album spent several weeks at number one on Billboard's Best-Selling Popular Record Albums chart in late 1945 – early 1946.

== Track listing ==
Set of five 10-inch 78-rpm records (RCA Victor P-234)

20-1703-A
No.	Title	Writer(s)	Length
1.	"Moonlight and Roses"	Lemare–Black–Moret

20-1703-B
No.	Title	Writer(s)	Length
1.	"It's Only a Paper Moon" (from the Paramount picture Take a Chance)	Harburg–Rose–Arlen

20-1704-A
No.	Title	Writer(s)	Length
1.	"Moonglow"	DeLange–Mills–Hudson

20-1704-B
No.	Title	Writer(s)	Length
1.	"Moon of Manakoora"	Frank Loesser—Alfred Newman

20-1705-A
No.	Title	Writer(s)	Length
1.	"Blue Moon"	Lorenz Hart—Richard Rodgers

20-1705-B
No.	Title	Writer(s)	Length
1.	"Shine On Harvest Moon"	Jack Norworth—Nora Bayes

20-1706-A
No.	Title	Writer(s)	Length
1.	"Carolina Moon"	Benny Davis—Joe Burke

20-1706-B
No.	Title	Writer(s)	Length
1.	"Moon Love" (adapted from Tchaikovsky's Fifth Symphony, 2nd movement)	David–Davis–Kostelanetz

20-1707-A
No.	Title	Writer(s)	Length
1.	"Moon over Miami"	Edgar Leslie—Joe Burke

20-1707-B
No.	Title	Writer(s)	Length
1.	"Racing with the Moon"	Watson–Monroe–Pope

== Charts ==
Chart (1945–1946)	Peak position
US Billboard Best-Selling Popular Record Albums	1

== See also ==
- List of Billboard Best-Selling Popular Record Albums number ones of 1945
- List of Billboard Best-Selling Popular Record Albums number ones of 1946
