= The Eddy Duchin Story =

1956 film by George Sidney

- Theatrical poster
- Directed by: George Sidney
- Screenplay by: Samuel A. Taylor
- Story by: Leo Katcher
- Produced by: Jerry Wald; Jonie Taps (associate producer)
- Starring: Kim Novak; Tyrone Power; Victoria Shaw; James Whitmore; Shepperd Strudwick
- Cinematography: Harry Stradling
- Edited by: Viola Lawrence; Jack Ogilvie
- Music by: George Duning
- Production company: Columbia Pictures
- Distributed by: Columbia Pictures
- Release date: June 21, 1956
- Running time: 123 minutes
- Country: United States
- Language: English
- Budget: $3 million
- Box office: $5.3 million (US)

The Eddy Duchin Story is a 1956 American biopic film of band leader and pianist Eddy Duchin starring Tyrone Power and Kim Novak. Filmed in CinemaScope, the Technicolor production was directed by George Sidney and written by Samuel A. Taylor from a story by Leo Katcher. Harry Stradling received an Academy Award nomination for his cinematography. The picture received four nominations in total and was one of the highest-grossing films of 1956. Incorporating signature elements of Duchin's style into his own, Carmen Cavallaro performed the piano music for the film and the soundtrack was also released as The Eddy Duchin Story (soundtrack).

Some of the film's box office success can be attributed to the appearance of Novak in ads for No-Cal diet soda. Novak became one of the first celebrities to be featured in advertisements for soft drinks, and each ad also featured a reminder to see Novak in The Eddy Duchin Story.

Musician Peter Duchin, whose relationship with his father is one of the storylines of the film, has written critically about the script, saying there was too much unnecessary fictionalization of his parents' lives and deaths.

== Plot ==
Fresh out of pharmacy school, young Eddy Duchin travels to New York in the 1920s to take a job playing piano for bandleader Leo Reisman's orchestra at a prestigious casino in Manhattan. But upon arrival, Eddy learns there is no such job for him. However, he jumps on stage and plays the piano so well that he makes a good impression on the audiences and attracts several important patrons.

A wealthy socialite, Marjorie Oelrichs, becomes captivated by his artistry on the piano. She comes to meet the performer and takes a personal interest in Eddy. He is invited to the home of her wealthy aunt and uncle, the Wadsworths, for a party. However, Eddy is slightly disappointed to discover that he has been asked there mainly to entertain. Meanwhile, his mastery of the piano is recognized by the impresario, Lou Sherwood and the bandleader, so he gets a steady gig at the casino. He soon invites his parents to visit him in New York and they meet Marjorie. Having fallen in love, Marjorie goes so far as to propose marriage to Eddy rather than the other way around. His parents approve the marriage. She has secret fears that she expresses on their wedding night, and tragedy strikes when Marjorie dies soon after giving birth to their child. Devastated, Eddy devotes himself to making music and tours the world with his band with impresario who became his closest friend and confidant. An anguished Eddy leaves his baby boy, Peter, in the care of Wadsworths family with a nice governess to look after the child. Five years later, Eddy, tired of touring returns to New York and meets Peter for the first time. At the start of the Second World War, Eddy joins the U.S. Navy and serves on a warship in the war. During the war, Eddy also plays piano for his fellow servicemen and also teaches a young boy to play chopsticks on the piano. After the war he is finally persuaded to visit his son, where he meets Peter's governess, a British immigrant named Chiquita. Eddy and Chiquita eventually grow on each other after an uneasy start. Eddy is amused witnessing that his son Peter is learning to play the piano following his father's trade.

Eddy's impresario, Lou gets him a contract performing at the prestigious ballroom of the Waldorf-Astoria hotel. The opening show starts on a high note with Eddy and his band performing the hottest dancing hits, including Aquarela do Brasil. The crowd is happy with the music, but suddenly Eddie's left hand freezes while at the keyboard and he is unable to complete his solo while his band continues to play. Although his problem is noticed by only a few musicians and his impresario, Eddy is devastated by his sudden disability. He eventually goes to the New York Hospital, and there he is diagnosed with a fatal neurological illness and learns that he has no more than a year to live. Chiquita attends Eddy at the hospital and they find comfort with each other. After he marries Chiquita, he struggles with telling Peter about his illness, but does, after first simply saying that soon he'll be "going away." Father and son play duo on two pianos and Eddy is now happy with his son's mastery of the profession.

== Cast ==
- Tyrone Power as Eddy Duchin
- Kim Novak as Marjorie Oelrichs
- Victoria Shaw as Chiquita Wynn
- James Whitmore as Lou Sherwood, the impresario
- Larry Keating as Leo Reisman
- Rex Thompson as Peter Duchin (age 12)
- Mickey Maga as Peter Duchin (age 5)

== Production ==
In 1954 Columbia paid $100,000 for the rights for a film biography of Eddy Duchin. The deal included a story by Leo Katcher, The Eddy Duchin Story. Attorney Sol Rosenblatt represented Katcher along with Duchin's son, Peter, and his widow, Maria Duchin, now Mrs Morgan Heap. The rights included approval on story and casting. George Sidney claims Columbia were given the rights to Duchin's life because W. Averell Harriman, who was close to Duchin, liked what that studio had done with films based on the life of Al Jolson.

George Sidney, the director, said he left MGM to work at Columbia in order to make the film (he had been taught piano by Duchin and seen the pianist's last concert). In November 1954 Columbia announced Sidney would direct, Jerry Wald would produce, and Moss Hart would write the script, the latter under a three-picture deal. Sidney says Hart dropped out when he fell ill so Samuel Taylor wrote it, with Clifford Odets doing some uncredited work.

Filming started 8 August 1955.

== Soundtrack recordings ==
In 1956 and 1957 respectively, two musical "soundtrack" recordings, that is, studio recordings of songs from the film, were issued. Twelve of the film's songs were released in The Sound Track Album, The Eddy Duchin Story, with Carmen Cavallaro at the piano. This recording was issued by Decca in 1956 (mono) as DL 8289 and reissued in stereo in 1965 as Decca DL 78289 (which was also issued in Mexico and Canada). In 1957, Capitol Records issued an LP album entitled, Selections from The Eddy Duchin Story (Capitol T-716), featuring nine of the original album's twelve soundtracks. Accompanied by the Harry Geller Orchestra, pianists George Greeley and Harry Sukman performed the selections. Somewhat ironically, both pianists imitated (usually quite closely and rather ably) Cavallaro's beloved interpretations of the songs rather than Duchin's. Given the extraordinary commercial success of the original soundtrack, it is no wonder.

=== Other soundtrack recordings ===
There was a musical tribute soundtrack, played by Al Lerner, A Tribute to Eddy Duchin. Released by Tops Records in 1957, this release featured the following tunes:

- "Manhattan"
- "Nocturne in E Flat"
- "Starlight Concerto"
- "Gee, Baby, I Ain't Too Good to You"
- "Shine"
- "Night Dreams"
- "My Heart Belongs to Daddy"
- "It Must Be True"
- "I Can't Give You Anything But Love, Baby"
- "Bésame Mucho"
- "Love Walked In"
- "Whispering"(A special detail from the vinyl record of this tribute is that it is not black, but is made of yellow translucent material, with some brown figures in veneer)

== Home video ==
A Blu-ray limited edition of 3000 copies was released by Twilight Time in 2014. The disc includes a restored hi-resolution version of the film scanned from original studio negatives and also includes two theatrical trailers of the film and other promotional material from 1956.

== Awards ==
The film was nominated for four Academy Awards.

- Cinematography (Color) - Harry Stradling
- Music (Scoring of a Musical Picture) - Morris Stoloff, George Duning
- Sound Recording - Columbia Studios Sound Department - John P. Livadary
- Writing (Motion Picture Story) - Leo Katcher

== See also ==
- List of American films of 1956
