= Chuck Miller (musician) =

American singer

Charles Nelson Miller (30 August 1924 – 15 January 2000) was an American singer and pianist who had a US top ten hit in 1955 with his version of "The House of Blue Lights".

== Career ==
He was born in Wellington, Kansas, United States, and learned to play piano as a child. Moon Mullican and Fats Waller were early singer piano influences. By the mid-1940s he was working as a singer and pianist in clubs in Los Angeles, before forming his own trio with bass player Robert Douglass. Miller was signed by Capitol Records in 1953, and began recording with arranger and saxophonist Dave Cavanaugh. His early recordings were middle-of-the-road pop and novelty numbers, influenced by Dean Martin and Bing Crosby, but his later recordings for Capitol, including "Idaho Red" and the self-penned "Hopahula Boogie", showed a more lively style.

In 1955, he moved to Mercury Records, and his recording of "The House of Blue Lights", arranged by Douglass, and first recorded in 1946 by Ella Mae Morse and Freddie Slack, became his most successful recording, reaching No. 9 on the US pop chart. However, his immediate follow-ups, "Hawk-Eye" (written by Boudleaux Bryant) and "Boogie Blues" were less successful. He then recorded more upbeat numbers in New York City with producer Hugo Peretti, including "Bright Red Convertible", "Baby Doll", and his second hit, "The Auctioneer", which reached No. 59 on the chart in late 1956. His other recordings included "Vim Vam Vamoose", "Cool It Baby!", "Down the Road A-Piece", and a version of the Everly Brothers' "Bye Bye Love". He also recorded an album for Mercury, Songs After Hours, which contained a mixture of swing era covers and more upbeat rock and roll numbers.

After being dropped by Mercury, he recorded one unsuccessful album for Imperial Records, Now Hear This! Songs Of The Fighting 40s, before gradually fading into obscurity. He and his trio had a residency in Boise, Idaho for a while, before Douglass left and Miller moved to Anchorage, Alaska, did a stint playing piano in The Sage Room at Harvey's Lake Tahoe, and later to Maui where he played at The Whale's Tale for many years.

== Death ==
He died in Lahaina, Maui, in 2000 at the age of 75.
