= King of the Roaring '20s: The Story of Arnold Rothstein =

1961 film by Joseph M. Newman

King of the Roaring 20s: The Story of Arnold Rothstein
- Film poster
- Directed by: Joseph M. Newman
- Screenplay by: Jo Swerling
- Story by: Leo Katcher
- Based on: The Big Bankroll: The Life and Times of Arnold Rothstein, King of the Roaring 20s 1859 book by Leo Katcher
- Produced by: Samuel Bischoff; David Diamond
- Starring: David Janssen; Dianne Foster; Diana Dors; Jack Carson
- Cinematography: Carl E. Guthrie
- Edited by: George White
- Music by: Franz Waxman
- Distributed by: Allied Artists
- Release date: June 11, 1961
- Running time: 106 min.
- Country: United States
- Language: English

King of the Roaring 20s: The Story of Arnold Rothstein is a 1961 American, biopic, drama, crime film directed by Joseph M. Newman, produced by Samuel Bischoff and starring David Janssen, Dianne Foster, Diana Dors and Jack Carson. The film is about the prohibition era gangster Arnold Rothstein, who rises to be a major figure in the criminal underworld. It is also known by the alternative title The Big Bankroll. It was based on a book by Leo Katcher.

== Plot ==
Arnold Rothstein gains a reputation in 1920s New York City as an expert gambler. He so impresses mob boss Big Tim O'Brien that he is given a job in his illegal enterprises.

Rothstein has a lifelong pal, Johnny Burke, and makes a deadly enemy, Phil Butler, a corrupt cop. He rises to become rich and well known in gambling circles, often using ruthless tactics, like tricking business partner Jim Kelly into sacrificing his half of their arrangement. Kelly had become an unreliable alcoholic, so Rothstein was partially justified.

Although he has little time for a personal life, Rothstein impulsively marries Carolyn Green, an attractive actress. He devotes little effort to their marriage, his principal obsessions being to build a huge bankroll and to someday win a poker hand with a royal flush. Their first day of married life is spent at the racetrack, where the groom spends time with everybody but his wife. Carolyn finds it amusing the first time, and not so amusing many other times.

As his empire grows, so does his arrogance. Rothstein eventually sells out his only friend, resulting in Burke's being gunned down by thugs. He and lawyer Tom Fowler conspire to make sure Butler is exposed and convicted for his criminal activities. But Rothstein does nothing to prevent Fowler's disbarment, thus making another enemy. And the Burke incident has gained Rothstein a reputation as a stool pigeon. He finds himself ostracized by the gambling community. He is so hungry for action that he suspects nothing when gamblers from Chicago invite him to a high-stakes poker game. He is shot dead from underneath the table.He was holding a Royal Flush in Spades, including the "Ace Of Spades" death card.

== Cast ==
- David Janssen – Arnold Rothstein
- Jimmy Baird - Arnold Rothstein as a boy
- Mickey Rooney – Johnny Burke (based on Herman Rosenthal)
- Tim Rooney – Johnny Burke as a boy
- Dianne Foster – Carolyn Green Rothstein
- Diana Dors – Madge (based on Peggy Hopkins Joyce)
- Jack Carson – Timothy W. 'Big Tim' O'Brien (based on "Big Tim" Sullivan)
- Dan O'Herlihy – Detective Phil Butler (based on Charles Becker)
- Mickey Shaughnessy – Jim Kelly
- Keenan Wynn – Tom Fowler (based on Bill Fallon)
- William Demarest – Henry Hecht
- Regis Toomey – Bill Baird (based on Herbert Bayard Swope)
- Robert Ellenstein – Lenny
- Joseph Schildkraut – Abraham Rothstein (Arnold's father)

== Production ==
The film was based on a 1959 non fiction book The Big Bankroll. The New York Times called it a "galloping account".

The book was a best seller and several companies were interested in film rights. In October 1959, film rights were bought by Allied Artists, who had enjoyed a big commercial success with Al Capone (1959) and were interested in making more gangster films. The purchase price was described as "well into six figures as against a percentage of the gross." Variety put the figure at $150,000.

David Diamond was assigned to produce and he wanted Dean Martin to play the lead. Gene Kelly reportedly expressed interest in starring and directing.

Allied Artists were undertaking their most ambitious film program in five years, announcing 15 films would be made over 6 months. Several of these had a gangster theme including The Big Bankroll and The George Raft Story.

Producers Sam Bischoff and David Diamond had previously made The Phenix City Story.

The producers could not get releases from the real-life people depicted in the film apart from Rothstein's wife Carolyn. So the only people using their real names as Arnold Rothstein, his wife and his father. People like Tim Sullivan were renamed Tim O'Brien. "To this generation there's no difference between Sullivan and O'Brien - it's an honest precaution," said Diamond.

The lead role went to David Janssen who had recently made Hell to Eternity and Dondi for Allied. Diana Dors had recently relocated to Hollywood. Mickey Rooney's son Tim played the character depicted by his father as a child.

== Omissions ==
The film does not explore Rothstein's possible involvement in the fixing of 1919 Baseball World Series, known infamously as the Black Sox Scandal.

== Reception ==
Variety called it a "wobbly chronicle... tediously mechanical in character and outrageously contribed in its embellishment of the 'real life' story".
