= Song of Norway (original Broadway cast recording) =

Cast recording by members of the original New York cast
- Released: 1945
- Genre: Show tunes
- Label: Decca

Professional ratings
Review scores
Source	Rating
AllMusic	4/5 stars

Edwin Lester's production of "Song of Norway", a new operetta based on the life and music by Edvard Grieg, or simply Song of Norway, credited to members of the original New York cast, is an album containing the original studio cast recording of the 1944 Broadway musical Song of Norway. It was released by Decca Records in 1945.

== Release ==
The album was originally issued as a set of six 10-inch 78-rpm phonograph records (cat. no. A-382).

In 1949, the album was made available on LP (cat. no. DL 8002). It was also available on six 45s (cat. no. 9-1).

== Reception ==
The album spent two weeks at number one on Billboard's Best-Selling Popular Record Albums chart in April and May 1945.

== Track listing ==
Album of six 12-inch 78-rpm phonograph records (Decca DA-382)

All tracks are written by Edvard Grieg and adapted by Robert Wright—George Forrest except "I Love You" ("Ich liebe dich") written by Edvard Grieg and arranged by Albert Sirmay.

Side 1
No.	Title	Artist(s)	Length
1.	"Prelude and Legend" (A Minor Concerto) (Act 1—Scene 1)	Robert Shafer with Song of Norway orchestra

Side 2
No.	Title	Artist(s)	Length
1.	"Hill of Dreams" (A Minor Concerto) (Act 1—Scene 1)	Lawrence Brooks—Helena Bliss—Robert Shafer with Song of Norway orchestra

Side 3
No.	Title	Artist(s)	Length
1.	"Freddy and His Fiddle" (Norwegian Dance No. 2, Op. 35) (Act 1—Scene 2)	Kent Edwards and Gwen Jones with Song of Norway chorus and orchestra

Side 4
No.	Title	Artist(s)	Length
1.	"Now" (Waltz Op. 12 and Violin Sonata No. 2) (Act 1—Scene 2)	Kitty Carlisle with Song of Norway chorus and orchestra

Side 5
No.	Title	Artist(s)	Length
1.	"Strange Music" ("Nocturne" and "Wedding Day in Troldhaugen") (Act 1—Scene 2)	Lawrence Brooks and Helena Bliss with Song of Norway orchestra

Side 6
No.	Title	Artist(s)	Length
1.	"(1)" "Midsummer's Eve" ("'Twas on a Lovely Eve in June" and "Scherzo in E Minor") "(2)" "March of the Trollgers" ("Mountaneers' Song", "Halling in G Minor" and "March of the Dwarfs") (Act 1—Scene 2)	Helena Bliss—Lawrence Brooks—Kitty Carlisle—Robert Shafer and Song of Norway chorus and orchestra

Side 7
No.	Title	Artist(s)	Length
1.	"(1)" "Hymn of Bethrothal" ("To Spring") "(2)" "Finale of Act 1"	Ivy Scott—Helena Bliss—Lawrence Brooks—Kitty Carlisle—Robert Shafer with Song of Norway chorus and orchestra

Side 8
No.	Title	Artist(s)	Length
1.	"Bon vivant" ("Water Lily") (Act 2—Scene 1)	Sig Arno and Lawrence Brooks with Song of Norway chorus and orchestra

Side 9
No.	Title	Artist(s)	Length
1.	"(1)" "Three Loves" ("Albumbaitt" and "Poem Erotique" "(2)" "Finaletto: Part 1" (Act 2—Scene 1)	Kitty Carlisle—Lawrence Brooks with Song of Norway chorus and orchestra

Side 10
No.	Title	Artist(s)	Length
1.	"Finaletto: Part 2" "(1)" "Nordraak's Farewell" ("Springtide") "(2)" Reprise of "Three Loves" ("Albumbaitt" and "Poem Erotique") (Act 2—Scene 1)	Robert Shafer—Helena Bliss—Lawrence Brooks—Kitty Carlisle with Song of Norway chorus and orchestra

Side 11
No.	Title	Artist(s)	Length
1.	"(1)" "I Love You" ("Ich liebe dich") "(2)" "At Christmastime" ("Woodland Wanderings") (Act 2—Scenes 3 and 4)	Helena Bliss—Walter Kingsford—Ivy Scott with Song of Norway chorus and orchestra

Side 12
No.	Title	Artist(s)	Length
1.	"Song of Norway—Finale" (Poem by Milton Lazarus)	Lawrence Brooks—Helena Bliss—Robert Shafer with Song of Norway chorus and orchestra

== Charts ==
Chart (1945)	Peak position
US Billboard Best-Selling Popular Record Albums	1

== See also ==
- List of Billboard Best-Selling Popular Record Albums number ones of 1945
