= Leo Katcher =

American journalist

Leo Katcher (October 14, 1911 – February 27, 1991) was an American reporter, screenwriter, and author. As West Coast Correspondent of the New York Post in 1952, he helped to break the story about Nixon's election expenses, which provoked Nixon into making his televised defence, still remembered as the Checkers Speech. In 1956, Katcher was nominated for an Academy Award for Best Story for The Eddy Duchin Story.

== Early life and career ==
Katcher was born in Bayonne, New Jersey in 1911; he had two younger sisters and two younger brothers. He received his first newspaper job from the Bayonne Evening News at the age of ten; he was hired as an office boy in exchange for his promise to stop hitting handballs off the side of the paper's offices. After being educated at Pennsylvania and NYU, and working for the Philadelphia Ledger and Philadelphia Record, he went to work for the Post, rising to the position of city editor. While working for the Post, he obtained an exclusive jailhouse interview with Bruno Hauptmann, who was executed for the kidnapping and murder of the Lindbergh baby.

== Later life and career ==
In the 1940s, Katcher moved to California, becoming the Post's West Coast correspondent. He helped break the story of Richard Nixon's fund to reimburse him for his political expenses. The Post ran the story under the headline "Secret Rich Men's Trust Fund Keeps Nixon in Style Far Beyond His Means", causing Senator Nixon to tell Katcher's brother Edward, also a reporter, that Leo Katcher was "a son of a bitch". Nixon successfully defused the Fund crisis with his Checkers speech. Katcher would go on to work for John F. Kennedy's successful 1960 presidential campaign against Nixon.

Katcher's books included, The Big Bankroll: The Life and Times of Arnold Rothstein, about the mobster/gambler, which was adapted into a movie, King of the Roaring Twenties (1961). He used his connections with Chief Justice Warren to write a respectful biography of Warren, Earl Warren: A Political Biography. He wrote several screenplays, and was nominated for an Academy Award for Best Story in 1956 for The Eddy Duchin Story but did not win.

In his final years, he served as a political columnist for the Oceanside Blade Citizen and Oceanside Breeze. He died of a heart attack in Oceanside on February 27, 1991.

== Bibliography ==
- Morris, Roger (1990), Richard Milhous Nixon: The Rise of an American Politician, Henry Holt and Company, ISBN 0-8050-1834-4
