= Carmen Cavallaro =

American pianist (1913–1989)

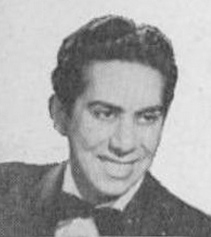

Background information
- Born: Carmen Cavallaro Calderone; May 6, 1913; New York City, U.S.
- Died: October 12, 1989 (aged 76) Columbus, Ohio, U.S.
- Genre: Light
- Occupation: Pianist
- Instrument: Piano
- Years active: 1933–1989
- Formerly of: Guy Mitchell
- Spouses: Wanda M. Ziegal (m. 1935; div. 1962); Donna S. Cavallaro

Carmen Cavallaro Calderone (May 6, 1913 – October 12, 1989) was an American pianist. He established himself as one of the most accomplished and admired light music pianists of his generation.

== Music career ==
Carmen Cavallaro was born in New York City, United States. Known as the "Poet of the Piano", he showed a gift for music from age three, picking out tunes on a toy piano. His parents were encouraged to develop the child's musical talents and he studied classical piano in the United States. As a young pianist, he toured Europe, performing in many capitals.

In 1933, Cavallaro joined Al Kavelin's orchestra, where he quickly became the featured soloist. After four years, he switched to a series of other big bands, including Rudy Vallee's in 1937. He also worked briefly with Enric Madriguera and Abe Lyman.

Cavallaro formed his own band, a five-piece combo, in St. Louis, Missouri, in 1939. His popularity grew and his group expanded into a 14-piece orchestra, releasing some 19 albums for Decca over the years. Although his band traveled the country and played in all the top spots, he made a particular impact at the Mark Hopkins Hotel in San Francisco, which became a favored venue, and which also later became a favorite spot of George Shearing and Mel Tormé. Other venues where he drew large audiences included New York's Hotel Astor, Chicago's Palmer House and the Coconut Grove in Los Angeles. In 1963 he had a million-seller hit recording of the song, "Sukiyaki".

One of Cavallaro's vocalists, Guy Mitchell, later became famous in his own right.

Cavallaro's single best-selling recording was his pop version of "Chopin's 'Polonaise'", Op. 53.

He was awarded a Star on the Hollywood Walk of Fame at 6301 Hollywood Boulevard in Hollywood.

== Influences and style ==
Cavallaro developed a piano-playing style of glittering and rippling arpeggios to augment his melody, which was often arranged in thick and lush triple- and quadruple-octave chords. His musical interests and arrangements included dance music, particularly Latin rhythms, tangos and strict tempo dancing styles, as well as some pop and jazz arrangements of classical melodies. In this, he is often cited as being influenced by pianist Eddy Duchin. Liberace was greatly influenced by both Cavallaro and Duchin. Liberace joked that he stole "everything except the flashy rings" from Cavallaro. All three shared a propensity for arranging classical piano themes in a pop idiom.

Cavallaro became a member of ASCAP in 1958. Although he wrote several songs, including "Dolores My Own" and "Anita", the most popular were "While the Night Wind Sings" and "Masquerade Waltz".

== Radio and film ==
Cavallaro also became famous through the media of radio and film, firstly with his regular program on NBC during the 1940s, The Sheaffer Parade, of which he was the host, In 1948 his program was the summer replacement for A Date with Judy on NBC radio. Later in films, he played himself, starting with Hollywood Canteen (1944), then Diamond Horseshoe, Out of This World (both 1945) and The Time, The Place and The Girl (1946). In the short subject "HOLLYWOOD VICTORY CARAVAN" (1945), he played George Gershwin's piano piece "Variations On I Got Rhythm". His most celebrated film achievement was playing the piano music for actor Tyrone Power's hands to mime, in The Eddy Duchin Story (1956).

== Personal life ==
Carmen Cavallaro was son of Italian immigrants Paulo Cavallaro and Maria Calderone. He was married to Wanda M. Ziegal on 6 May 1935. They had three children (Delores Cavallaro Buscher, Paul Cavallaro and Anita Cavallaro Finkelstein) and one grandchild (Andrea Finkelstein Sherman). They were divorced on December 28, 1962.

Cavallaro died from prostate cancer and pneumonia on October 12, 1989 in Columbus, Ohio. He was survived by his second wife Donna S. Cavallaro and children.

== Discography ==
=== Albums ===
- 1939: Dancing in the Dark (Decca)
- 1941: I'll See You in My Dreams (Decca)
- 1941: All the Things You Are ... (Decca)
- 1942: Strauss Waltzes (Decca)
- 1942: Songs of Our Times – 1932 (Decca) – No. 1 in the US
- 1946: Dancing in the Dark (Decca) – No. 1 in the US
- 1947: Serenade: Italian Folk Songs (Decca) – No. 4 in the US
- 1948: Irving Berlin Songs with Dick Haymes (Decca)
- 1949: For Sweethearts Only (Decca)
- 1950: Carmen Cavallaro at the Piano (Decca)
- 1950: Songs of Our Times – 1921 (Decca) – No. 7 in the US
- 1950: Richard Rodgers and Oscar Hammerstein II (Decca)
- 1951: Guys and Dolls (Decca)
- 1952: Tangos for Romance (Decca)
- 1956: Rome at Midnight (Decca)
- 1956: For Latin Lovers (Decca)
- 1956: The Masters' Touch (Decca)
- 1956: The Eddy Duchin Story (soundtrack, Decca) – No. 1 in the US
- 1957: Poetry in Ivory (Decca)
- 1958: Cavallaro with That Latin Beat (Decca)
- 1958: 12 Easy Lessons in Love (Decca)
- 1960: Informally Yours (Decca)
- 1960: Plays His Show Stoppers (Decca)
- 1960: The Franz Liszt Story (Decca)
- 1960: Cocktails with Cavallaro (Decca)
- 1961: Cocktail Time (Decca)
- 1962: Swingin' Easy (Decca)
- 1962: Hits from Hollywood (Decca)
- 1965: Eddy Duchin Remembered (Decca)
- 1969: Love Can Make You Happy (Decca)
