= Deep in the Heart of Texas (film) =

1942 film by Elmer Clifton

- Theatrical release poster
- Directed by: Elmer Clifton
- Written by: Oliver Drake; Grace Norton (adaption)
- Produced by: Oliver Drake (associate producer)
- Starring: Johnny Mack Brown; Tex Ritter; Fuzzy Knight; Jennifer Holt
- Cinematography: Harry Neumann
- Edited by: Maurice Wright
- Music by: Hans J. Salter
- Distributed by: Universal Pictures
- Release date: August 1942
- Running time: 62 minutes
- Country: United States
- Language: English

Deep in the Heart of Texas is a 1942 American black-and-white Western film directed by Elmer Clifton and starring Johnny Mack Brown as a man instrumental in restoring Texas after the end of the American Civil War. The film is best known for its performance of American folk song "Deep in the Heart of Texas" which is sung by country singer Tex Ritter with the Jimmy Wakely Trio.

== Plot ==
The film's main character is righteous Jim Mallory. He and his friend, "Happy" T. Snodgrass, are seeking Jim's father, because they have heard about his cruel domination. They try to stop him with this gang. After they manage to stop their activity with the help of newspaper publisher Jonathan Taylor, his daughter Nan and Governor representative Brent Gordon. But then, Jim is put into the jail. After this complication, Jim's father decides he joins Brent and Jonathan and they together let Jim free.

== Cast ==
- Johnny Mack Brown as Jim Mallory
- Tex Ritter as Brent Gordon
- Fuzzy Knight as 'Happy' T. Snodgrass
- Jennifer Holt as Nan Taylor
- William Farnum as Colonel Mallory
- Harry Woods as Sergeant Idaho
- Kenneth Harlan as Captain Sneed
- Pat O'Malley as Jonathan Taylor
- Roy Brent as Sam Franklin
- Edmund Cobb as Lieutenant Matthews
- Jimmy Wakely Trio as Saloon Musicians

== Accolades ==
In 2004, the American Film Institute nominated song "Deep in the Heart of Texas" from this film for AFI's 100 Years...100 Songs.
