= Carousel (original Broadway cast recording) =

Cast recording by members of the original New York Production
- Released: 1945
- Genre: Show tunes
- Label: Decca

Selections from the Theatre Guild musical play "Carousel" featuring members of the original New York Production, or simply Carousel, is a 1945 album containing the original studio cast recording of that year's Broadway musical Carousel. The album was released by Decca Records.

== Release ==
The album was originally issued as a set of five 12-inch 78-rpm phonograph records (cat. no. DA-400). The package included a synopsis of the musical's plot and a booklet with lyrics.

In 1949, the album was made available on LP (cat. no. DL 8003).

== Reception ==
The album spent several weeks at number one on Billboard's Best-Selling Popular Record Albums chart.

== Track listing ==
Album of five 12-inch 78-rpm phonograph records (Decca DA-400)

Side 1
No.	Title	Artist(s)	Length
1.	"The Carousel Waltz" (Prologue)	Carousel orchestra

Side 2
No.	Title	Artist(s)	Length
1.	"(1)" "You're a Queer One, Julie Jordan" "(2)" "Mister Snow"	Jean Darling and Jan Clayton with Carousel girls and orchestra

Side 3
No.	Title	Artist(s)	Length
1.	"If I Loved You"	Jan Clayton and John Raitt with Carousel orchestra

Side 4
No.	Title	Artist(s)	Length
1.	"June Is Bustin' Out All Over"	Christine Johnson and Jean Darling with Carousel chorus and orchestra

Side 5
No.	Title	Artist(s)	Length
1.	"Soliloquy—Part 1"	John Raitt with Carousel orchestra

Side 6
No.	Title	Artist(s)	Length
1.	"Soliloquy—Part 2"	John Raitt with Carousel orchestra

Side 7
No.	Title	Artist(s)	Length
1.	"When the Children Are Asleep"	Eric Mattson and Jean Darling with Carousel orchestra

Side 8
No.	Title	Artist(s)	Length
1.	"(1)" "Blow High, Blow Low" "(2)" "This Was a Real Nice Clambake"	Murvyn Vye; Eric Mattson—Jean Darling with Carousel chorus and orchestra

Side 9
No.	Title	Artist(s)	Length
1.	"(1)" "There's Nothin' So Bad for A Woman" "(2)" "What's the Use of Wond'rin'"	Murvyn Vye—Connie Baxter; Jan Clayton with Carousel girls and orchestra

Side 10
No.	Title	Artist(s)	Length
1.	"(1)" "The Highest Judge of All" "(2)" "You'll Never Walk Alone"	John Raitt—Christine Johnson; Jan Clayton with Carousel chorus and orchestra

== Charts ==
Chart (1945)	Peak position
US Billboard Best-Selling Popular Record Albums	1
