= Freddie Slack =

American pianist and bandleader (1910–1965)

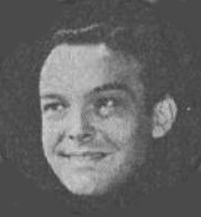

Background information
- Born: Frederick Charles Slack; August 7, 1910; Viroqua, Wisconsin, United States
- Died: August 10, 1965 (aged 55) Hollywood, Los Angeles, California, United States
- Genres: Swing, boogie-woogie
- Occupations: Pianist, bandleader

Frederick Charles Slack (August 7, 1910 – August 10, 1965) was an American swing and boogie-woogie pianist and bandleader.

== Life and career ==
Slack was born in Westby, Wisconsin, United States. He learned to play drums as a boy. Later he took up the xylophone, and at the age of 13 he changed to the piano. He studied with a local teacher throughout high school. At the age of 17, he moved with his parents to Chicago, where he continued his musical training. He met Rosy McHargue, a well-known clarinetist, who took him to hear many leading musicians, including Bix Beiderbecke and Earl Hines. His first job was with Johnny Tobin at the Beach View Gardens. He later moved to Los Angeles, where he worked with Henry Halstead, Earl Burtnett and Lennie Hayton, before joining Ben Pollack in 1934.

He played with the Jimmy Dorsey Band in the 1930s and was a charter member of the Will Bradley Orchestra when it formed in 1939. Known to bandmates as "Daddy Slack," he played the piano solo on Bradley's recording of "Beat Me Daddy, Eight to the Bar", one of the early white boogie-woogie hits and a classic of the big band era.

He formed his own band in 1942 and signed with the newly founded Capitol Records. He recorded three songs at his third recording session for Capitol, on May 21, 1942. His recording of "Cow Cow Boogie," sung by the 17-year-old Ella Mae Morse, was the second record the new Capitol issued, on July 1, and by July 25 it had reached number 1 on the hit parade. It was Capitol's first gold single.

T-Bone Walker was a member of Slack's band from 1942 to 1944, and Slack later accompanied Walker on his first solo recording for Capitol, "Mean Old World". This band also had a hit with "Strange Cargo."

Slack continued to record with Capitol until at least 1950, recording some 80 tracks for the label.

Slack also recorded as an accompanist for Big Joe Turner, Johnny Mercer, Margaret Whiting and Lisa Morrow.

In the original version of the song "Down the Road a Piece", recorded in 1940 by the Will Bradley Orchestra, Slack is mentioned in the lyrics:

If you wanna' hear some boogie then I know the place
It's just an old piano and a knocked-out bass.

The drummer-man's a guy they call eight beat Mack
You remember Doc and old "Beat Me Daddy" Slack.

Man it's better than chicken fried in bacon grease
Come along with me boy, it's just down the road a piece.

"Eight Beat Mack" refers to drummer Ray McKinley, and "Doc" relates to the band's bass player, Doc Goldberg.

His 1955 album, Boogie Woogie on the 88, featured a horn section including jazz musicians Shorty Sherock and Herbie Harper among others, with arrangements by Benny Carter.

He also co-wrote the 1945 classic "The House of Blue Lights", first recorded with singer Ella Mae Morse, and later by Chuck Miller, the Andrews Sisters, Chuck Berry, Jerry Lee Lewis, and Asleep at the Wheel.

He also accompanied Thelma Gracen during her singing career.

On August 10, 1965, Slack was found dead in his bedroom in Hollywood, Los Angeles, California, from undetermined causes.

== Partial discography ==
- Boogie Woogie (1945)
- Boogie Woogie, Volume II (1948)
- Boogie Woogie on the 88 (1955)
