= David Rose (songwriter) =

English-born American conductor and composer (1910–1990)

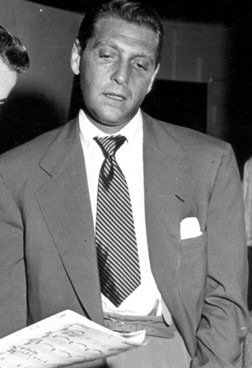
- Rose in 1946

Background information
- Born: David Daniel Rose; June 15, 1910; London, England
- Died: August 23, 1990 (aged 80) Burbank, California, U.S.
- Occupations: Songwriter, composer, arranger, orchestra leader
- Years active: 1939–1990

David Daniel Rose (June 15, 1910 – August 23, 1990) was a British-American songwriter, composer, arranger, pianist, and orchestra leader. His best known compositions were "The Stripper", "Holiday for Strings", and "Calypso Melody". He also wrote music for many television series, including It's a Great Life, The Tony Martin Show, Little House on the Prairie, Highway to Heaven, Bonanza, Leave It to Beaver, and Highway Patrol, some under the pseudonym Ray Llewellyn.

Rose's work as a composer for television programs earned him four Emmys. In addition, he was musical director for The Red Skelton Show during its 21-year run on the CBS and NBC networks. He was a member of Phi Mu Alpha Sinfonia, the national fraternity for men in music.

== Career ==
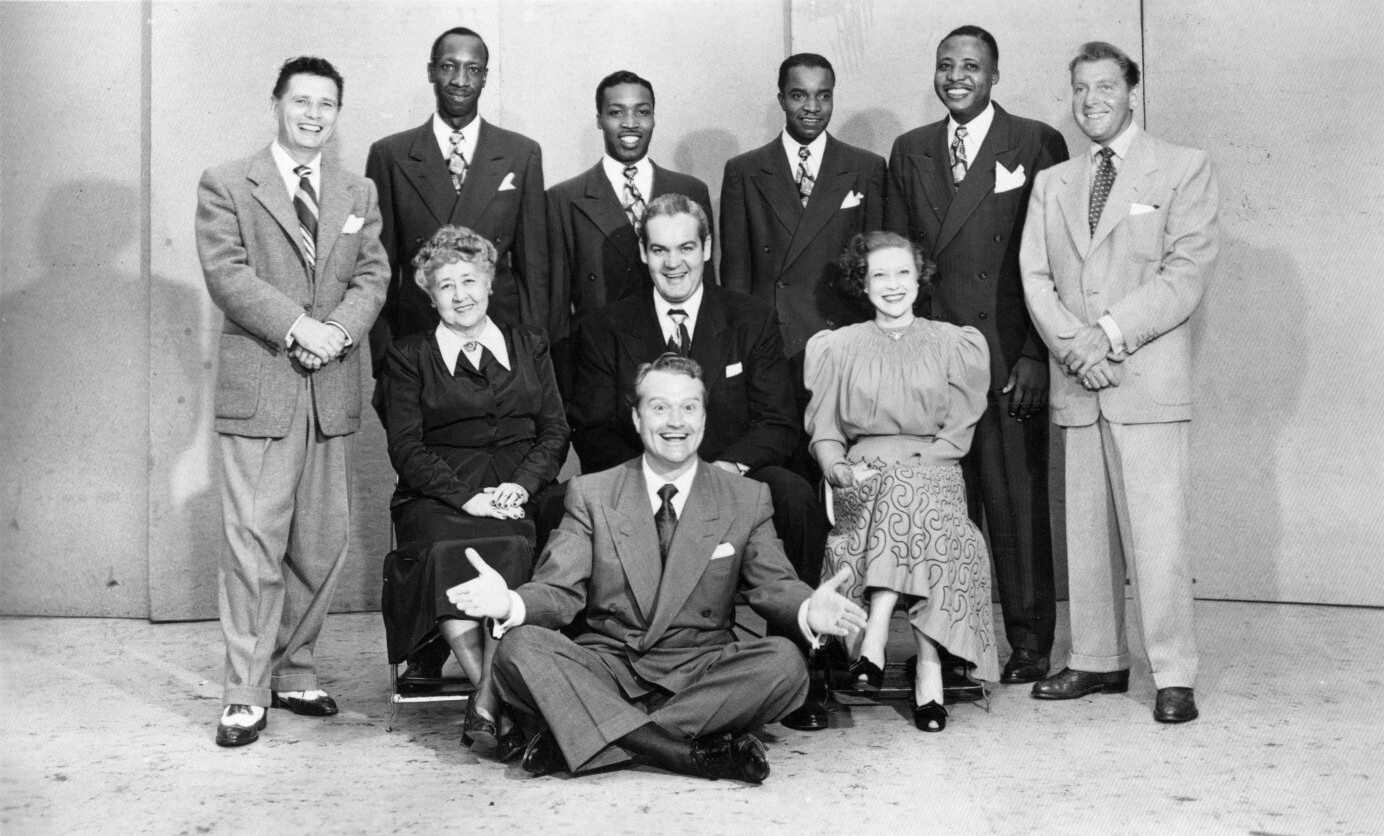
Photo of 1948 Raleigh Cigarettes Program cast: Standing: Pat McGeehan, The Four Knights, David Rose (orchestra leader). Seated: Verna Felton ("Grandma" to Skelton's "Junior" character), Rod O'Connor (announcer), Lurene Tuttle ("Mother" to Skelton's "Junior" character). Front: Red Skelton.

Rose was born in London, England, to Jewish parents, and raised in Chicago, Illinois, United States. The family name was originally Rosenberg. Rose's career in music began when he worked with Ted Fio Rito's band when he was 16. Rose also worked as a standby pianist for NBC Radio. There in the early 1930s, he first gained a reputation, while arranging for the Frank Trumbauer orchestra, and later leading a house band at station WGN.

He composed several early swing originals, such as "Break It Down", with Frankie Trumbauer, "Transcontinental", "Plantation Moods", and a piece recorded under three different titles: "I've Got It", "Itchola", and "Jigsaw Rhythm", his original version with the WGN band including Louis Prima.

=== Radio ===
Rose was asked to work in Hollywood, where he formed his orchestra, doing a twice-weekly radio show for Mutual Broadcasting System called California Melodies, writing all the broadcast arrangements. He worked his way up to becoming music director of the Mutual network. Rose's first try at composing was his hit song "Holiday for Strings". During World War II, Rose entered the Army, first meeting Red Skelton while both were enlisted. Skelton asked Rose to become the conductor for his Raleigh Cigarette Program. Rose joined the cast in 1948 and worked with Skelton on his television show for over 20 years.

In 1942, Rose and his orchestra provided the music for Tune Up, America! on Mutual. The program provided "recognition of the efforts of women engaged in war work".

=== Recording ===
In 1955, Rose was commissioned by MGM Studios to compose the score for their forthcoming science-fiction project Forbidden Planet. The music was completed and recorded, and based on the surviving track, it combined conventional instrumentation with some electronic elements. Rose was discharged from the project at the end of 1955 after the producers heard the electronic music of Louis and Bebe Barron and hired them to provide the final all-electronic soundtrack. A 7" single of Rose's unused theme from the film, backed by Bronislaw Kaper's theme for the MGM film The Swan (1956), was released during 1956 on MGM Records on which it was credited as being "inspired" by the film. Reportedly, Rose later destroyed all the original session recordings of his Forbidden Planet music.

In 1957, his rendition of Larry Clinton's "Calypso Melody" became Rose's second million-selling record and was awarded a gold disc.

"The Stripper", released in 1962, was composed by Rose in 1958 for a television special saluting burlesque. The song featured especially prominent trombone lines, giving the tune its lascivious signature, evoking the feel of music used to accompany burlesque striptease artists. Four years after the song was recorded, MGM Records wanted to rush-release Rose's recording of "Ebb Tide" as a 45-rpm single, but needed a B side. An office boy perused Rose's tapes searching for one, and "The Stripper" was chosen. It became a surprise hit, receiving considerable radio play.

"Holiday for Strings" became well known as the theme for Red Skelton's programs. A parody version, retitled "Holiday for States", was recorded as a vocal by Allan Sherman, with the straight melody, but with ersatz lyrics consisting of the names of American states.

== Personal life ==
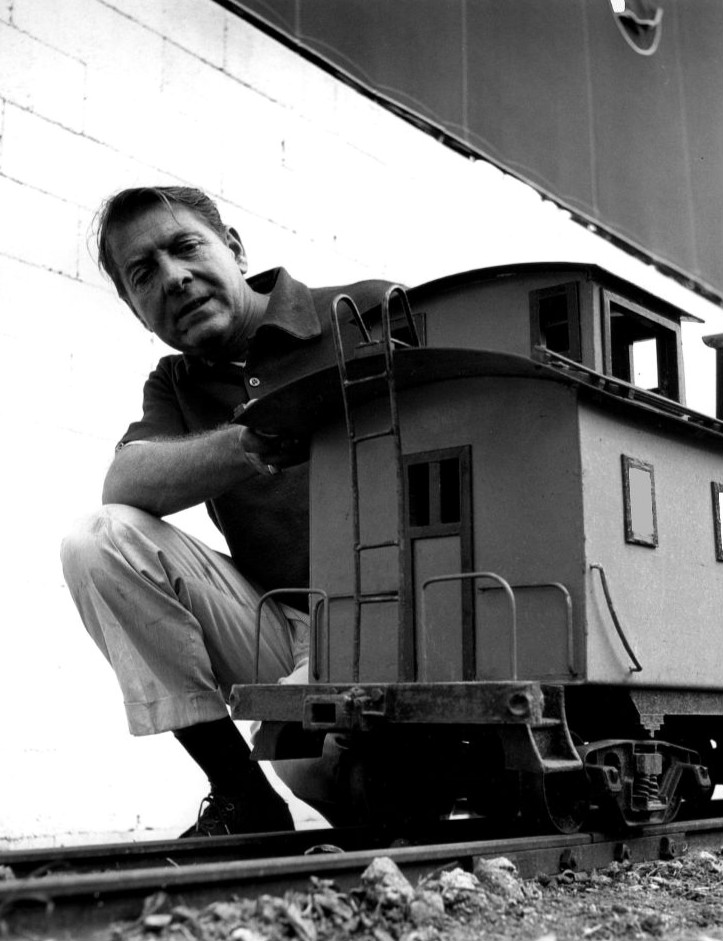
Rose with one of his miniature trains in 1959

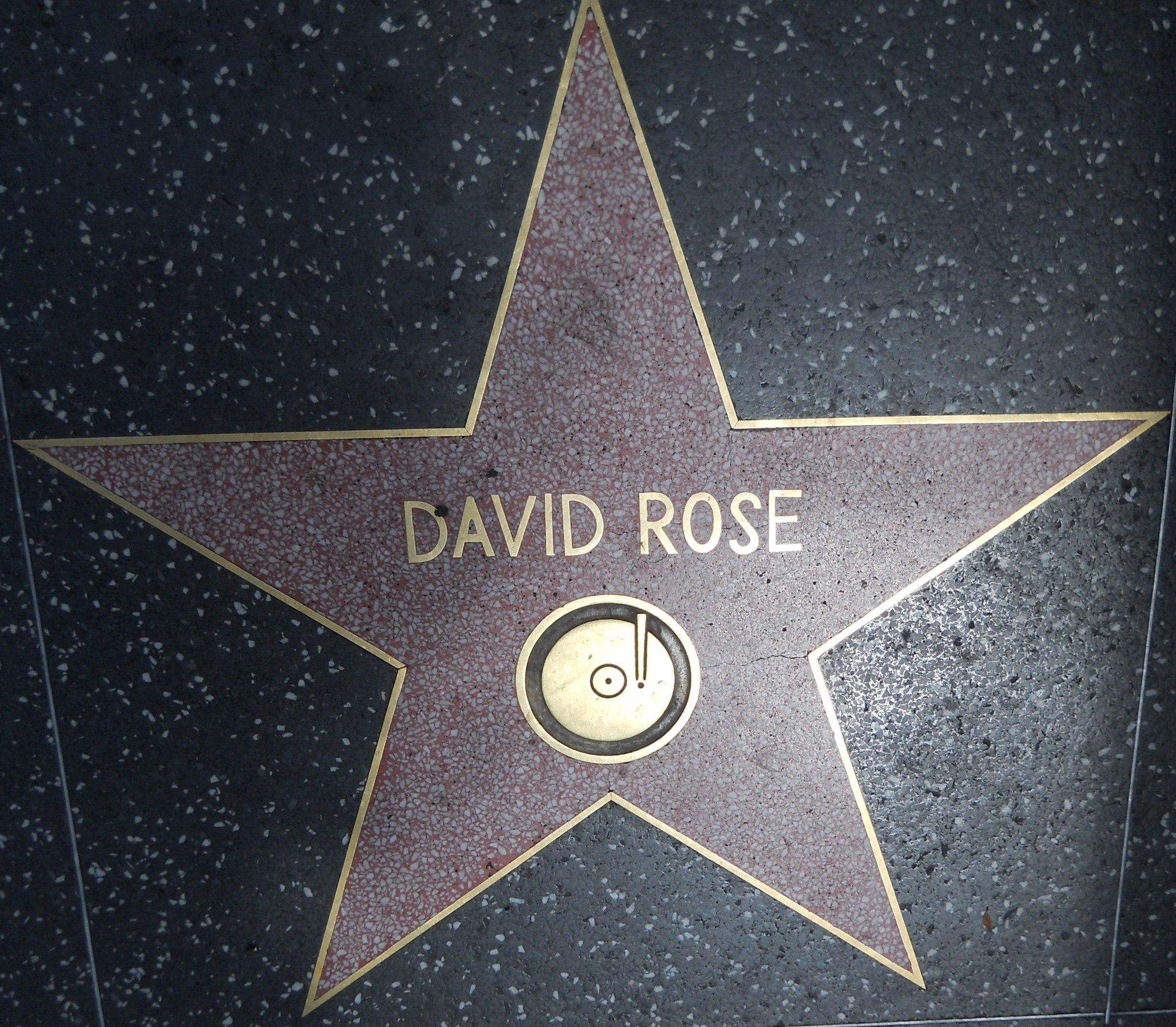
Star on the Hollywood Walk of Fame at 6514 Hollywood Blvd

Rose was married on October 8, 1938, to actress, singer and comedienne Martha Raye. The couple divorced on May 19, 1941.

Rose married for a second time, on July 28, 1941, to actress and singer Judy Garland. They had no children, though Garland, according to biographer Gerald Clarke, underwent an abortion during the marriage, at the insistence of her mother, her husband, and her motion picture studio, Metro-Goldwyn-Mayer. Garland and Rose divorced in 1944.

He had two daughters with his third wife, Betty Bartholomew (m. 1948 until his death in 1990). His granddaughter is singer-songwriter Samantha James.

Rose was a live steam hobbyist, with his own backyard railroad.

== Death ==
Rose died of a heart attack in Burbank, California, at the age of 80. He was buried in Mount Sinai Memorial Park Cemetery in Hollywood Hills, California.

== Music ==
=== Films ===
- Bright Road (1953)
- Confidentially Connie (1953)
- Hombre (1967)
- Never Too Late (1965)
- Operation Petticoat (1959)
- Please Don't Eat the Daisies (1960)
- Public Pigeon No. 1 (1957)
- Quick Before It Melts (1964)
- Sam's Son (1984)
- The Birdmen (1971)
- The Clown (1953)
- The Princess and the Pirate (1944)
- The Underworld Story (1950)
- This Rebel Breed (1960)
- Young Man with Ideas (1952)

=== Television ===
- Bonanza (1971 Emmy)
- Dundee and the Culhane
- Father Murphy
- Highway Patrol
- Highway to Heaven
- Little House on the Prairie (1979 and 1982 Emmys)
- Men into Space
- Mr. Adams and Eve
- Sea Hunt
- The High Chaparral
- The Red Skelton Show

=== Broadway ===
- Winged Victory

=== Singles ===
- "Holiday for Strings" (US No. 2, 1944)
- "Poinciana (Song of the Tree)" (US No. 11, 1944)
- "Calypso Melody" (US No. 42, 1957)
- "Swinging Shepherd Blues" (US No. 50, 1958)
- "The Stripper" (US No. 1, 1962)

=== Albums ===
• Autumn Leaves — David Rose and his Orchestra

- Like Blue (with André Previn) – MGM Records 1960

==== David Rose and His Orchestra ====
- A Cole Porter Review (1946)
