= Songs of Our Times =

Songs of Our Times was a series of albums of phonograph records released by Decca at the turn of the 1940s and 1950s.

Each album spotlighted the hits from a specific year from 1917 through 1943 and comprised four 78-rpm records.

Among the recording artists were pianist Carmen Cavallaro (1921, 1932), pianists Marlene Fingerle and Arthur Schutt (1926, 1929), and orchestras conducted by Bob Grant (1917, 1922, 1924, 1927, 1934, 1942, 1943), Ray Benson (1918, 1931), Ted Straeter (1919, 1930), Charles Baum (1923, 1933, 1940), Basil Fomeen (1925, 1928), Nat Brandwynne (1935, 1941).

Moreover, The Jesters contributed an album of railroad songs, titled Songs of Our Times: A Collection of Railroad Songs.

== Chart performance ==
The releases were highly successful, at some point in August 1948 occupying eight of the 12 spots of Billboard's Best-Selling Popular Albums chart. Earlier, in May, the album titled Songs of Our Times (1932), which was recorded by American pianist Carmen Cavallaro, ranked No. 1 for one week.

== Critical reception ==
Songs of Our Times (1943)
Review scores
Source	Rating
Billboard	73/100 ("good")

On October 16, 1948, Billboard reviewed one of the albums from the series, the one titled Songs of Our Times (1943) and recorded by Bob Grant and his orchestra. The reviewer rated it 73 on a scale of 100 ("good"), writing: "Package is made up of fox-trot medleys of 23 tunes of 1943 – with vocal choruses. The appeal is mostly nostalgic – this element being, of course, the strong attraction of Decca's Songs of Our Times idea. But the 1943 ditties are perhaps too close to modern times to have even a really strong nostalgic quality. From a musical standpoint, too, the 1943 vintage doesn't stack up too well." Nevertheless, the reviewer noted the "album's inside covers" carrying a "historical digest of 1943" and "detailing the political, cultural and artistic modes of the day."

== Charts ==
Songs of Our Times (1932) by Carmen Cavallaro

Chart (1948)	Peak position
US Billboard Best-Selling Popular Record Albums	1

Songs of Our Times (1921) by Carmen Cavallaro

Chart (1950)	Peak position
US Billboard Best-Selling Popular Record Albums	7

== See also ==
- List of Billboard Best-Selling Popular Record Albums number ones of 1948
