= Selections from Going My Way =

Selections from Going My Way (Academy Award Picture)
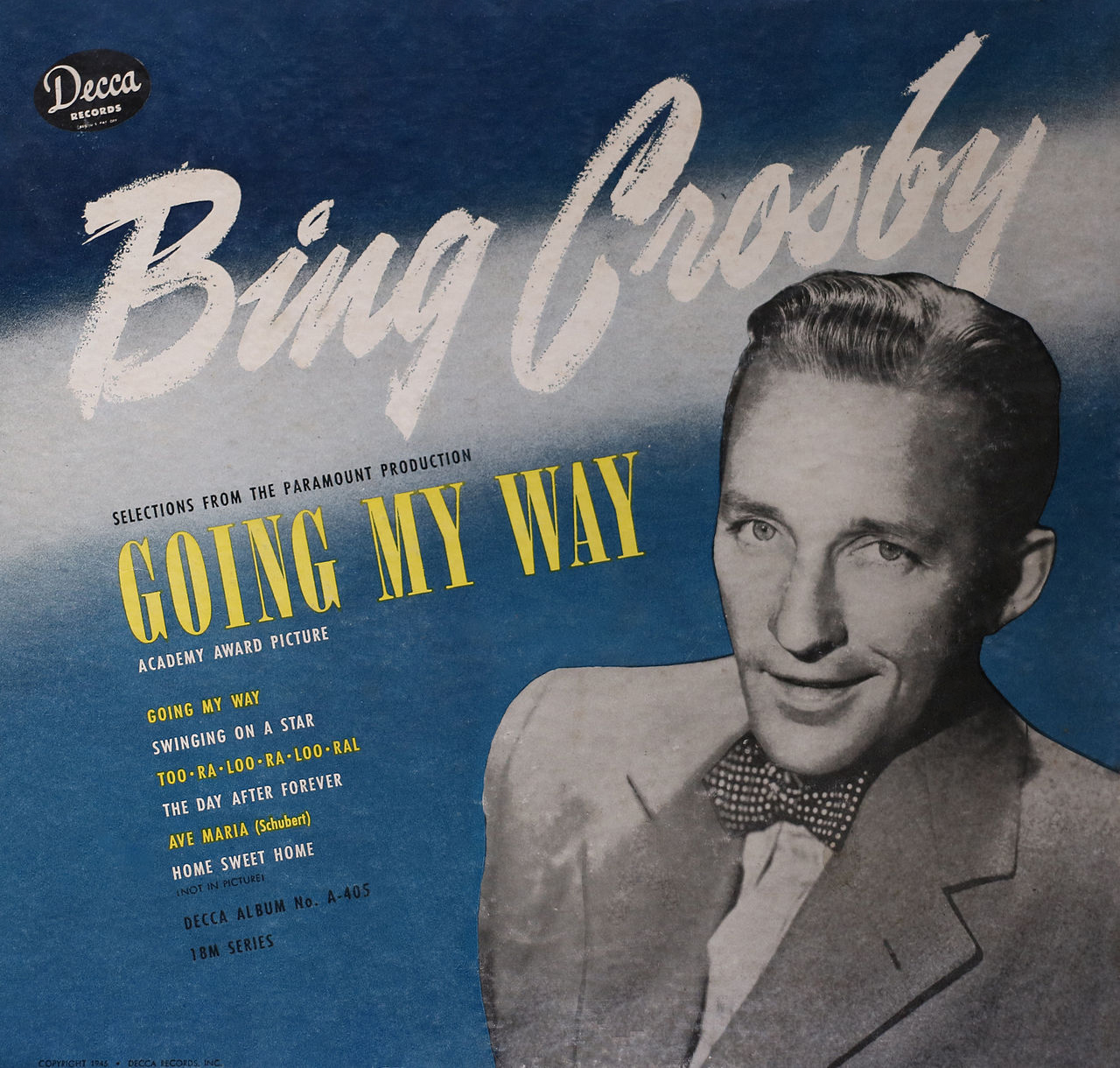

Studio album by Bing Crosby
- Released: Original 78 album: 1945; Original LP album: 1949
- Recorded: 1944, 1945
- Genre: Popular
- Label: Decca

Bing Crosby chronology
Merry Christmas (1945)	Selections from Going My Way (Academy Award Picture) (1945)	Selections from The Bells of St. Mary's (1946)

Professional ratings
Review scores
Source	Rating
Allmusic	4/5 stars

Selections from Going My Way is the second solo studio album by American singer and actor Bing Crosby released in late 1945 as a Phonograph record, featuring songs that were presented in the American musical comedy-drama film Going My Way. This was the first release of one of Crosby's best songs throughout his career, "Swinging on a Star", on shellac disc record.

== Chart performance ==
The album reached the top of the Billboard Best-Selling Popular Record Albums chart in October 1945.

== Track listing ==
These newly issued songs were featured on a 3-disc, 78 rpm album set, Decca Album No. A-405.

Side / Title	Writers	Recording date	Performed with	Time
Disc 1 (18597):
A. "Going My Way"	Johnny Burke, Jimmy Van Heusen	February 7, 1944	John Scott Trotter and His Orchestra	2:50
B. "Swinging on a Star" *	Johnny Burke, Jimmy Van Heusen	February 7, 1944	The Williams Brothers Quartet and John Scott Trotter and His Orchestra	2:28
Disc 2 (18704):
A. "Too-Ra-Loo-Ra-Loo-Ral"	James Royce Shannon	July 17, 1945	John Scott Trotter and His Orchestra	3:17
B. "The Day After Forever"	Johnny Burke, Jimmy Van Heusen	February 7, 1944	John Scott Trotter and His Orchestra	3:00
Disc 3 (18705):
A. "Ave Maria"	Franz Schubert	July 30, 1945	Victor Young and His Orchestra	3:16
B. "Home Sweet Home"	Henry Rowley Bishop, John Howard Payne	July 30, 1945	Victor Young and His Orchestra	2:55

*featuring a young Andy Williams

== Other releases ==
Decca released a dual 10-inch LP of Going My Way and The Bells of St. Mary's on Decca DL 5052 in 1949.
