= Selections from The Bells of St. Mary's =

Studio album by Bing Crosby
- Released: 1946 (original 78 rpm album); 1949 (original LP album)
- Recorded: 1945
- Genre: Popular
- Length: 11:53
- Label: Decca

Bing Crosby chronology
Selections from Going My Way (1945)	Selections from The Bells of St. Mary's (1946)	Don't Fence Me In (w/ The Andrews Sisters) (1946)

Selections from The Bells of St. Mary's is the third solo studio album by American singer and actor Bing Crosby released in 1946 as a Phonograph record, featuring songs that were presented in the American musical comedy-drama film The Bells of St. Mary's.

== Chart performance ==
The original 78 rpm album reached number one on the Billboard Best-Selling Popular Record Albums chart in March 1946.

== Track listing ==
These newly issued songs were featured on a 2-disc, 78 rpm album set, Decca Album No. A-410.

Selections from The Bells of St. Mary's track listing
Side / Title	Writers	Recording date	Performed with	Time
Disc 1 (18720):
A. "Aren't You Glad You're You?"	Johnny Burke, Jimmy Van Heusen	September 10, 1945	John Scott Trotter and His Orchestra	2:54
B. "In the Land of Beginning Again"	Grant Clarke, George W. Meyer	September 10, 1945	John Scott Trotter and His Orchestra	3:07
Disc 2 (18721):
A. "The Bells of St. Mary's"	A. Emmett Adams, Douglas Furber	September 10, 1945	John Scott Trotter and His Orchestra	3:04
B. "I'll Take You Home Again, Kathleen"	Thomas Paine Westendorf	July 17, 1945	John Scott Trotter and His Orchestra	2:48

== Other releases ==
Decca released a dual 10” LP of Going My Way and The Bells of St. Mary's on Decca DL 5052 in 1949.
