= Superstar (disambiguation) =

A superstar is a celebrity.

Superstar or superstars may also refer to:

== Film ==
- Superstar: The Karen Carpenter Story, a 1987 short film using Barbie dolls to tell the story of pop singer Karen Carpenter
- Superstar (1999 film), a 1999 Saturday Night Live-based movie starring Molly Shannon as her popular character, Mary Katherine Gallagher
- Super Star (2002 film), a Kannada film
- Superstar (2008 Hindi film), a Bollywood film
- Superstar (2008 Sinhala film), a Sri Lankan film
- Superstar (2009 film), an Iranian film
- Superstar (2012 film), a French film
- Superstar (2015 film), a Nigerian film
- Superstar (2017 film), a Gujarati film
- Superstar (2019 film), a Pakistani film
- Superstar (2021 film), a Nollywood film

== Television ==
=== Music talent shows ===
==== Based on Pop Idol ====
- Deutschland sucht den Superstar, the German version
- SuperStar (Arabic TV series), the Arabic version
- SuperStar KZ, a reality television show in Kazakhstan
- SuperStar Search Slovakia, the Slovak version
- Česko hledá SuperStar, the Czech version
- SuperStar (Czech and Slovak TV series)
- Superstar (Croatian TV series), the Croatian version

==== Other music talent shows ====
- Superstar (Brazilian TV series), a Brazilian live reality television singing competition based on the Israeli series Rising Star
- Super Star (Taiwanese TV series) (超級巨星紅白藝能大賞), a TTV annual music televised special series
- Superstar USA, an American reality television series
- Superstar (British TV series), a UK television talent search, looking for the lead role in the production Jesus Christ Superstar

=== Other series ===
- Superstar (Philippine TV program), a Philippine musical variety show hosted by Nora Aunor
- Superstar (American TV series), an American documentary television series
- Superstars (American TV program), a sports competition television program that aired on ABC, NBC and CBS
  - The Superstars (2009 edition), a 2009 American revival of the sports competition television program
- Superstars (British TV programme), a sports competition television program that began in 1973
- WWE Superstars, a syndicated television show produced by the WWE
- WWF Superstars of Wrestling (later known as WWF Superstars), a syndicated television show produced by the World Wrestling Federation {now WWE}

=== Episodes ===
- "Superstar" (Buffy the Vampire Slayer), a 2000 episode of Buffy the Vampire Slayer
- "Superstar" (The Goodies), a 1973 episode of The Goodies

== Music ==
=== Bands ===
- Superstar (band), a Scottish indie pop band led by Joe McAlinden

=== Albums ===
- Superstar (Caroline Rose album), 2020
- Superstar (Len album), 1995
- Super Star (NaNa album), 1998
- Super Star (S.H.E album), 2003
- Superstar (VTEN album), 2020
- Superstar (Wizkid album), 2011
- The Superstars, a 1982 album by Stars on 45

=== Songs ===
- "Superstar" (A. G. Cook song), 2016
- "Superstar" (Christine Milton song), 2002, also covered by Jamelia
- "Superstar" (Delaney and Bonnie song), 1969, co-written by Leon Russell, notably recorded by the Carpenters and Luther Vandross
- "Superstar" (Ice Prince song), 2011
- "Superstar" (Jade MacRae song), 2005
- "Superstar" (Jesus Christ Superstar song), 1970
- "Superstar" (Lupe Fiasco song), 2007
- "Superstar" (Lydia Murdock song) by Lydia Murdock, released in 1983
- "Superstar" (Madonna song), 2012
- "Superstar" (Marina song), 2019
- "Superstar" (Pegboard Nerds and Nghtmre song), 2016
- "Superstar" (Senhit song), 2026
- "Superstar" (Tiziano Ferro and Giorgia song), 2026
- "Superstar" (Toy-Box song), 2001
- "Superstar" (TVXQ song), 2011
- "Superstars" (song), by David Fonseca, 2007
- "Supastars", by Migos, 2018
- "Rascal (Superstar)", by Tinashe, 2020
- "Superstar", by Beach House, from Once Twice Melody, 2022
- "Superstar", by Big Time Rush, from Elevate, 2011
- "Superstar", by Böhse Onkelz, from Adios, 2004
- "Superstar", by Carrie Lucas from Horsin' Around, 1984
- "Superstar", by Destroy Lonely from If Looks Could Kill, 2023
- "Superstar", by Geri Halliwell, from Passion, 2005
- "Superstar", by Gucci Mane, from Delusions of Grandeur, 2019
- "Superstar", by Ja Rule from Pain Is Love 2, 2012
- "Superstar", by Lisa from Juicy Music, 2003
- "Superstar", by Nilon Bombers from the album Bird, 1996
- "Superstar", by RuPaul from Glamazon, 2011
- "Superstar", by Saliva from Every Six Seconds, 2001
- "Superstar", by Sycco, 2022
- "Superstar", by Usher from Confessions, 2004
- "SuperStar", by Taylor Swift from Fearless, 2009
- "Superstar", by Underground Lovers from Dream It Down, 1994
- "Superstar", by Wiz Khalifa from Flight School, 2009
- "Süper Star", by Sibel Tüzün, Turkey's 2006 Eurovision entry
- "Super Star", by Kwon Ji Yong
- "Super Star", by S.H.E. from Super Star
- "Superstar", by Keyshia Cole from The Way It Is, 2005
- "Superstar", by XO-IQ, featured in the television series Make It Pop
- "Superstar", by Neha Kakkar and Vibhor Parashar, 2020, music video starring Anushka Sen
- "Superstar", by Rainbow Kitten Surprise, 2024
- "Superstar", by Young Thug and Future from Slime Language 2, 2021

== Video games ==
- Kirby Super Star, a 1996 video game
- WWF Superstars, 1989 arcade game
- WWF Superstars (handheld video game), 1991 game for Game Boy
- WWF Superstars 2, its sequel
- Super Star, an item that grants invincibility in the Super Mario franchise
- SuperStar (video game series), South Korean rhythm game series
  - SuperStar SM Town, 2014 entry in the series
- Mario Party Superstars, a 2021 Nintendo Switch party game
- Sega Superstars, a 2004 PlayStation 2 party game
- Sonic Superstars, a 2023 platform game

== People ==
- "Superstar" Krishna (1943–2022), Indian film actor, director and producer in Telugu cinema
- "Superstar" Mahesh Babu (born 1975), Indian actor
- "Superstar" Rajinikanth (born 1950), Indian actor
- "Superstar" Nora Aunor (1953–2025), Filipino actress
- "Superstar" Santhosh Pandit, Indian actor and filmmaker
- Har Mar Superstar (born 1978), musician from Minnesota
- Princess Superstar (aka Concetta Kirschner, born 1971), Italian-American rapper
- Rajesh Khanna (1942–2012), Indian film actor and politician, known as the "First Superstar" of Indian cinema
- Roni Duani (born 1986), Israeli singer also known as Roni Superstar
- Shakib Khan (born 1979), Bangladeshi actor popularly referred as Superstar Shakib Khan
- Warhol superstars, the associates of Andy Warhol
- WWE Superstar, a branding term referring to a WWE wrestler
  - Superstar Billy Graham (born 1943), used the name Superstar
  - Steve Austin (born 1964), who used the name Superstar during his short time in Extreme Championship Wrestling

== Other uses ==
- Adidas Superstar, the name of a sneaker
- Superstars Series, a touring car championship based in Europe
- Guitar Superstar, a yearly guitar competition by Guitar Player magazine
- Pascal Lota, a fast ropax ferry owned by Estonia-based Tallink, formerly known as MS Superstar
- MS SuperStar, ferry belonging to the Greek shipping company Seajets
- Super Star (ride), a fairground ride manufactured by Super-rides International
- Superstars (novel), a 2000 novel by Ann Scott
- Superstar (ski course), a women's World Cup alpine ski piste in Killington, Vermont, US
- An upgraded variant of the Ted Smith Aerostar, a twin-engine utility aircraft

== See also ==
- Jesus Christ Superstar (disambiguation)
