= Rock Star =

Rock Star or Rockstar may refer to:

== Films ==
- Rock Star (2001 film), an American film starring Mark Wahlberg
- Rockstar (2011 film), an Indian Hindi-language film by Imtiaz Ali
- Rockstar (2015 film), an Indian Malayalam-language film by V. K. Prakash
- Rockstar (2026 film), a Bangladeshi romantic musical film

== Television ==
- Rock Star (TV series), a reality television program about the selection of a new lead vocalist for a different band each season
  - Rock Star: INXS, the first season of the above reality television program
  - Rock Star: Supernova, the second season of the above reality television program
  - Rock Star Supernova, a band created by this series

== Music ==
=== Albums ===
- Rockstar (Bosson album)
- Rockstar (Sfera Ebbasta album)
- Rockstar (Dolly Parton album)
- Rock-Star (Stray Kids EP)
- Rockstar (soundtrack), Bollywood film soundtrack by A.R. Rahman
- Rokstarr, an album by Taio Cruz

=== Songs ===
- "Rockstar" (Bizarre song), 2005
- "Rockstar" (DaBaby song), 2020
- "Rockstar" (Dappy song), 2012
- "Rockstar" (Hardy song), 2024
- "Rockstar" (Lisa song), 2024
- "Rockstar" (Nickelback song), 2005
- "Rockstar" (Poison song), 2001
- "Rockstar" (Post Malone song), 2017
- "Rockstar" (Prima J song), 2007
- "Rock Star" (Hannah Montana song), 2007
- "Rock Star" (N.E.R.D song), 2001
- "Rock Star" (R. Kelly song), 2007
- "Rock Star" (Reece Mastin song), 2012
- "Rockstar 101", by Rihanna, 2009
- "Rockstar", by Abhi the Nomad from Abhi vs the Universe, 2021
- "Rockstar", by Ali Zafar from the TV show Coke Studio, 2015 (season 8)
- "Rockstar", by Brokencyde from I'm Not a Fan, But the Kids Like It!, 2009
- "Rock Star", by Hole from Live Through This, 1994 (initially titled "Olympia" but mislabeled)
- "Rockstar", by Emily Kinney, 2014
- "Rockstar", by Jimmy Eat World from Static Prevails, 1996
- "Rockstar", by Junior H from $ad Boyz 4 Life II, 2023
- "Rockstar", by Mallrat, 2020
- "Rockstar", by Stand Atlantic from Was Here, 2024
- "Rock Star", by Willow Smith, 2011

== Other ==
- Rockstar Consortium, an organization formed to negotiate licensing for patents acquired from bankrupt Nortel
- Rockstar Energy, a brand of energy drink
- Rockstar Games, a games developer most notable for the Grand Theft Auto series, and its subsidiaries
- "Rockstar", a code word identifying the USS Liberty, notably used in its 8 June 1967 distress call

== See also ==
- Rock music
- Popstar (disambiguation)
- "(Si Si) Je Suis un Rock Star", a 1981 song by Bill Wyman
- Superstar (disambiguation)
- Star rock
