= So Hot Right Now =

So Hot Right Now may refer to:

- So Hot Right Now (album), 2005 album by The Similou, or the title song
- "So Hot Right Now" (Jade MacRae song), 2005 song by Australian Jade MacRae
