= Superstar Iz*One =

2020 video game

SuperStar Iz*One
- Logo featuring member Nako Yabuki
- Developer: Dalcomsoft Inc.
- Platforms: iOS, Android
- Release: April 23, 2020
- Genre: Music

SuperStar Iz*One was a South Korean rhythm game developed by Dalcomsoft, Inc. and PONOS Corp. in collaboration with label Off The Record which was launched simultaneously on South Korea and Japan in April 2020. The game featured songs by Iz*One and was available in South Korea and Japan only. The game was playable in Korean and Japanese. The game was part of the SuperStar video game series.

SuperStar Iz*One was a score-based, note-matching music game just like SuperStar SM Town game that was previously released. The goal was to complete a song and gain the highest score by a song in every single week. The songs were available in three levels: Easy, Normal and Hard. As of May 31, 2021, the game featured a total of 65 songs from their discographies.

It was reported on May 15, 2020, by PONOS Corp. that the game had reached 300,000 downloads.

== Release ==
SuperStar Iz*One was the second video game that featured the group after an RPG-themed game Iz*One Remember Z.

The full release was scheduled on April 21 but was delayed to April 23 instead. SuperStar Iz*One was released after SuperStar Woollim, which was released on April 21, the original release date of SuperStar Iz*One.

The release of the game was announced on April 8 thus users able to pre-registering themselves on both App Store and Google Play Store. On April 10, the game reached 50,000 pre-register users, and three days later it reached a total of 80,000 users.

== Gameplay ==
Like any rhythm games, players tap descending colored objects when they align with the bar at the bottom of the screen, the goal is being to score the highest points from the chosen soundtrack and competing each other in a league to go up a rank on the weekly chart league named "SS*One Ranking". Tapping the objects in time correctly, and consecutively without any misses, gives bonus points. Every available soundtrack is grouped in different category which is moon, snow and flower.

The game used card system which from the lowest is C, B, A, S and R. Each card was available in different theme that featured the group member photos such as Girly Style Collection, Vampire Style Collection and so on. Just like the soundtrack, the cards were also grouped in category as moon, snow and flower.

For first time use, the user was designated to choose the members and play "La Vie en Rose" to matching their tapping with the game and receive a cards pack. Along with tapping the colored objects (beat), user was given an option to play with video or a fixed image as the background. The videos were from the performances of the group Japanese commemoration showcase "Suki to Iwasetai" or simply from their music videos. Every action in the game such as play the soundtrack, combining the cards and going up the rank was counted in XP points to level up the rank. Every rank had their own setup for equip the amount of cards to keep.

The game was monetized through in-app-purchases to purchasing their headphones and diamond to play the soundtrack and purchase the cards. Headphones were gained from daily missions or when users ranked up.

== Soundtrack ==
SuperStar Iz*One contain a total of 20 songs in Korean and Japanese. Unlike their previous SuperStar series, the songs didn't need to get unlocked to play every available songs. Below is a list of songs available for the game, the song name is sorted and stylized from the game:

Album	Song title	Duration	Background play
"Suki to Iwasetai"	"Neko Ni Naritai"	2:11	Live
-	"I Am" (Iz*One ver.)	1:28	Live
"Suki to Iwasetai"	"Gokigen Sayonara"	1:25	Live
-	"다시 만나" (Iz*One ver.) (Dasi manna; Let's meet again)	1:25	Live
"Suki to Iwasetai"	"Dance Wo Omoidasu Made"	2:01	Live
Color*Iz	"꿈을 꾸는 동안" (Iz*One ver.) (Kkumeul kkuneun dongan)	1:28	Live
"Suki to Iwasetai"	"Suki to Iwasetai"	1:54	Live
Color*Iz	"O' My!"	1:31	Live
Color*Iz	"내꺼야" (Naekkeoya)	2:08	Live
"Buenos Aires"	"Buenos Aires"	1:52	Music video
"Buenos Aires"	"Target"	1:48	Music video
"Buenos Aires"	"Toshishita Boyfriend"	1:42	Music video
"Vampire"	"Vampire"	1:22	Music video
Heart*Iz	"Violeta" (비올레타)	1:19	Music video
Bloom*Iz	"Fiesta"	1:52	Music video
Heart*Iz	"해바라기" (Haebaragi; lit. Sunflower)	0:00	Live
Oneiric Diary	"환상동화 (Secret Story of the Swan)" (Hwansangdonghwa; lit. Fantasy fairytale )	0:00	Music video
Color*Iz	"La Vie en Rose" (라비앙로즈)	1:52	Live
Color*Iz	"앞으로 잘 부탁해" (Iz*One ver.) (Apeuro jal butakhae; We Together)	1:30	Live
Color*Iz	"반해버리잖아?" (Iz*One ver.) (Banhaebeorijanha?; lit. Don't you like me? )	1:41	Live

== End of service ==
On March 28, 2021, it was announced that SuperStar Iz*One would be ending its service on May 31 at 12:00 JST due to the end of Iz*One's activities.

In-app-purchases were disabled after April 28. Diamonds obtained from the Diamond Shop could be refunded if they had not been spent before the End of Service. The refund period was from May 31 to July 31, 2021.
