= List of awards and nominations received by Kanye West =

Kanye West awards and nominations
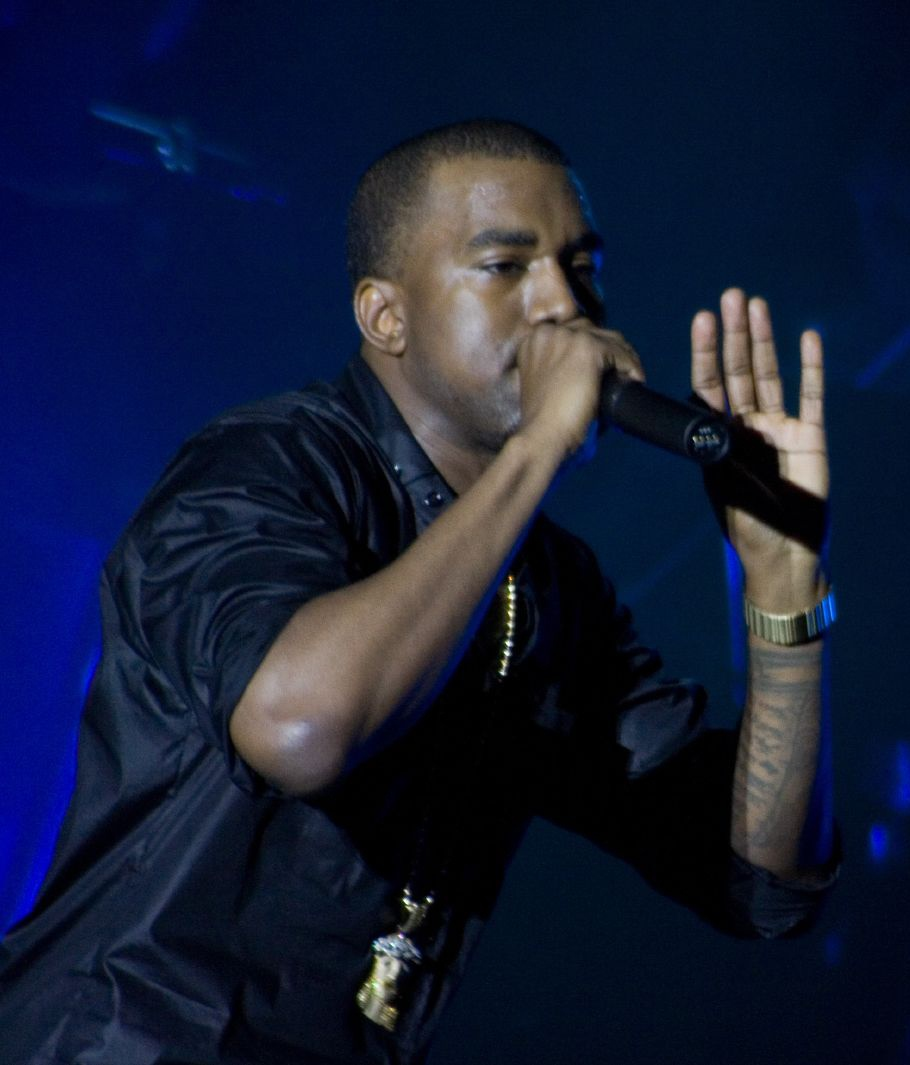
- West performing at the Stockholm Jazz Festival in July 2006
Awards and nominations
Award	Wins	Nominations
Accessories Council Excellence Awards	1	1
Artist Empowerment Coalition Awards	1	1
American Music Awards	3	12
Antville Music Video Awards	3	19
ARIA Music Awards	0	1
BEFFTA Awards	0	2
Best Art Vinyl Awards	0	2
BET Awards	11	39
BET Hip Hop Awards	19	88
The BET Honors	1	1
Billboard.com Mid-Year Music Awards	0	4
Billboard Music Awards	18	41
Billboard R&B/Hip-Hop Awards	2	11
Billboard R&B/Hip-Hop Power Players Event	2	2
Black Reel Awards	2	2
BMI London Awards	4	4
BMI London Awards	6	6
BMI Pop Awards	7	7
BMI R&B/Hip-Hop Awards	38	38
Brit Awards	3	10
Clio Awards	5	6
Danish Music Awards	0	3
Designs of The Year Awards	0	1
Dieline Awards	1	1
Dove Awards	1	3
ECHO Awards	0	1
Esky Music Awards	2	2
FN Achievement Awards	1	1
Fonogram Hungarian Music Awards	2	5
Glamour Awards	1	1
Grammy Awards	24	76
GQ Men of the Year Awards	1	1
GQ Most Stylish Man of the Year Awards	2	4
HipHopDX Awards	12	26
iHeartRadio Music Awards	0	2
International Dance Music Awards	3	9
Kiss Awards	3	5
Meteor Music Awards	1	4
Million Man March Award	1	1
MOBO Awards	6	21
MP3.com Awards	2	2
MP3Music Awards	0	2
MTV Africa Music Awards	0	1
MTV Asia Awards	0	3
MTV Australia Awards	0	4
MTV Europe Music Awards	3	24
MTV Italian Music Awards	1	1
MTV Millennial Awards	0	1
MTV Movie Awards	0	1
MTV Video Music Awards	5	40
MTV Video Music Awards Japan	0	13
MTV Video Music Brazil Awards	0	3
MTV Video Play Awards	2	2
MTVU Woodie Awards	1	6
MuchMusic Video Awards	0	14
Music Video Production Awards	4	10
NAACP Image Awards	1	20
NME Awards	2	18
NRJ Music Awards	0	3
O Music Awards	1	8
People's Choice Awards	2	6
Pollstar Awards	0	3
Q Awards	0	1
Shorty Awards	0	1
Smash Hits Awards	0	1
Soul Train Music Awards	4	19
Source Awards	3	10
Sucker Free Awards	2	3
Swiss Music Awards	0	3
TEC Awards	0	2
Teen Choice Awards	1	26
The Recording Academy Honors	1	1
The Record of the Year	0	1
TMF Awards	0	1
TMH Awards	1	5
TRL Awards	1	3
UK Festival Awards	0	1
UK Music Video Awards	2	9
Urban Music Awards UK	1	3
Urban Music Awards USA	2	5
Urban Music Awards Australia and New Zealand	1	1
Vibe Awards	2	10
Virgin Media Music Awards	1	4
Webby Awards	1	1
World Music Awards	2	11
XM Nation Awards	1	2
XXL Awards	5	15

Totals (Note: Certain award groups do not simply award one winner. They acknowledge several different recipients, have runners-up, and have third place. Since this is a specific recognition and is different from losing an award, runner-up mentions are considered wins in this award tally. For simplification and to avoid errors, each award in this list has been presumed to have had a prior nomination.)
- Wins: 273
- Nominations: 794

Kanye West is an American rapper and record producer. He has received various awards and nominations for his work in each of the aforementioned fields. West rose to prominence in the early 2000s, earning several honors for his work as a producer. He transitioned to become a recording artist, and won Best New Male Artist at both the 2004 World Music Awards and 2004 Billboard Music Awards. The same year, West released his debut album The College Dropout (2004). The album won several awards, and helped West receive the third most Grammy nominations in one night (10) at the 47th Annual Grammy Awards. The album won Best Rap Album, while its single "Jesus Walks" won Best Rap Song. The latter would elsewhere win Best Male Video at the 2005 MTV Video Music Awards.

West's second studio album Late Registration (2005) received the joint-most nominations at the 48th Annual Grammy Awards, with eight. He took home three awards, and became only the second artist to win Best Rap Album back-to-back, as well as the first artist to win Best Rap Song in consecutive years. In the same year, he won Best International Male at the 2006 Meteor Awards. West received the most nominations at the 50th Annual Grammy Awards for his third studio album Graduation (2007), with eight. The album won in four out of the five rap categories, and West became the first solo artist to have his first three studio albums be nominated for Album of the Year.

West's fourth studio album 808s & Heartbreak (2008) was nominated for Album of the Year at the 2009 Soul Train Music Awards, and featured the single "Love Lockdown", which received three nominations at the 2009 MTV Video Music Awards, including Video of the Year. Elsewhere in 2009, West won a record-equalling third Brit Award for International Male Solo Artist. West's fifth studio album My Beautiful Dark Twisted Fantasy (2010), and collaborative album Watch The Throne (2011) with Jay-Z earned him the most nominations at the 54th Annual Grammy Awards—seven, of which he won four. He repeated the feat a year later, when he led (jointly) the Grammy nominees for a fifth time at the 55th Annual Grammy Awards, taking home three awards.

The compilation album Cruel Summer (2012) was released by the label GOOD Music, which West founded, and led to him receiving a record seventeen nominations at the 2012 BET Hip Hop Awards. His sixth solo album Yeezus (2013) received a nomination for Best Album at the 2014 NME Awards. In 2015, West won Shoe of the Year for the Yeezy Boost at the Footwear News Achievement Awards. He also became only the second rapper to receive the MTV Video Vanguard Award, in addition to receiving the Visionary Award at The BET Honors. West's seventh solo studio album The Life of Pablo (2016) released alongside his Yeezy Season 3 fashion show, won him Artist of the Year at the 20th Annual Webby Awards, along with two Clio Awards in fashion and marketing. The album's merchandise (released via a pop-up project across 21 cities) earned West a nomination at the 2017 Beazley Designs of the Year. In 2018, West earned his first Grammy nomination for Producer of the Year, Non-Classical at the 61st Annual Grammy Awards. His eighth studio album Ye (2018) was nominated for Best Foreign Hip-Hop Album at the 2019 Hungarian Music Awards. West's 2019 album Jesus Is King and single "Follow God" gave him wins at the 51st GMA Dove Awards, as well as his first in the Christian/Gospel categories at the 2020 Billboard Music Awards. At the 64th Annual Grammy Awards, West equalled the record for most Grammys won by a hip-hop artist (24).

== ACE Awards ==
The Accessories Council Excellence Awards were created in 1997 to pay homage to those individuals and groups that have made great strides in raising the awareness of the accessories industry. West has received one award.

Year	Nominee / work	Award	Result	Ref.
2010	Kanye West	Stylemaker Award	Won	

== AEC Awards ==
The Artist Empowerment Coalition Awards recognizes those who understand the importance of giving back to their community, while encouraging others along the way to do the same. Honoree's are awarded for their individual contributions. West has received one award.

Year	Nominee / work	Award	Result	Ref.
2005	Kanye West	Making a Difference	Won	

== American Music Awards ==
The American Music Awards is an annual music awards show created by Dick Clark in 1973. West has received three awards from twelve nominations.

Year	Nominee / work	Award	Result	Ref.
2004	The College Dropout	Favorite Rap/Hip-Hop Album	Nominated	
2004	Kanye West	Favorite Breakthrough Artist	Nominated	
2004	Kanye West	Favorite Rap/Hip-Hop Male Artist	Nominated	
2006	Kanye West	Favorite Rap/Hip-Hop Male Artist	Nominated	
2006	Kanye West	Favorite Pop/Rock Male Artist	Nominated	
2008	Kanye West	Favorite Rap/Hip-Hop Male Artist	Won	
2008	Graduation	Favorite Rap/Hip-Hop Album	Won	
2011	Watch The Throne	Favorite Rap/Hip-Hop Album	Nominated	
2011	Kanye West	Favorite Rap/Hip-Hop Artist	Nominated	
2015	"FourFiveSeconds" (with Rihanna & Paul McCartney)	Collaboration of the Year	Nominated	
2020	Kanye West	Favorite Contemporary Inspirational Artist	Nominated	
2021	Kanye West	Favorite Artist – Gospel	Won	

== Antville Music Video Awards ==
The Antville Awards are annual online awards that recognize the best music videos of the past year. West has received three awards from nineteen nominations.

Year	Nominee / work	Award	Result	Ref.
2005	"Gold Digger"	Best Video	Nominated	
2007	"Can't Tell Me Nothing"	Most Fun Video	Nominated	
2008	"Flashing Lights"	Best Narrative Video	Nominated	
2008	"Flashing Lights"	Best Urban Video	Won	
2009	"Welcome to Heartbreak"	Best Performance Video	Nominated	
2009	"Welcome to Heartbreak"	Hype Williams Award	Won	
2009	"Welcome to Heartbreak"	Best Music Video of the Year	Nominated	
2010	Kanye West	Best Commissioning Artist	Won	
2010	"Runaway"	Best Cinematography	Nominated	
2010	"Power"	Most Fun Video	Nominated	
2011	"Otis" (with Jay-Z)	Most Fun Video	Nominated	
2011	"Otis" (with Jay-Z)	Best Performance Video	Nominated	
2011	"Otis" (with Jay-Z)	Best Hip-Hop Video	Nominated	
2011	"Monster"	Best Hip-Hop Video	Nominated	
2012	"No Church in the Wild" (with Jay-Z)	Best Cinematography	Nominated	
2012	"No Church in the Wild" (with Jay-Z)	Best Hip-Hop Video	Nominated	
2012	"Niggas in Paris" (with Jay-Z)	Best Hip-Hop Video	Nominated	
2013	"Bound 2"	Best Hip-Hop Video	Nominated	
2013	"Black Skinhead"	Best Hip-Hop Video	Nominated	

== ARIA Music Awards ==
The ARIA Music Awards is an annual awards ceremony that recognises excellence, innovation, and achievement across all genres of Australian music.

Year	Nominee / work	Award	Result	Ref.
2021	Kanye West Donda	Best International Artist	Nominated	

== BEFFTA Awards ==
The BEFFTA Awards celebrate and reward the achievements of black personalities within entertainment, film, fashion, television and arts. West has received two nominations.

Year	Nominee / work	Award	Result	Ref.
2014	Kanye West	Best International Act	Nominated	
2016	Kanye West	Best International Act	Nominated	

== Best Art Vinyl Awards ==
The Best Art Vinyl Awards are yearly awards established in 2005 by Art Vinyl Ltd to celebrate the best album artwork of the past year. West has received two nominations.

Year	Nominee / work	Award	Result	Ref.
2005	Late Registration	Best Vinyl Art	Nominated	
2011	Watch The Throne	Best Vinyl Art	Nominated	

== BET Awards ==
=== BET Awards ===
The BET Awards were established in 2001 by the Black Entertainment Television network to celebrate Black Americans and other minorities in music, acting, sports, and other fields of entertainment over the past year. West has received eleven awards from thirty-nine nominations.

Year	Nominee / work	Award	Result	Ref.
2004	"All Falls Down" (featuring Syleena Johnson)	Viewer's Choice	Nominated	
2004	"Slow Jamz" (with Twista & Jamie Foxx)	Best Collaboration	Nominated	
2004	Kanye West	Best New Artist	Won	
2004	Kanye West	Best Male Hip-Hop Artist	Nominated	
2005	Kanye West	Best Male Hip-Hop Artist	Won	
2005	Kanye West	Best Gospel Artist	Nominated	
2005	"Jesus Walks"	Video of the Year	Won	
2006	"Gold Digger" (featuring Jamie Foxx)	Video of the Year	Won	
2006	"Gold Digger" (featuring Jamie Foxx)	Best Collaboration	Won	
2006	Kanye West	Best Male Hip-Hop Artist	Nominated	
2008	Kanye West	Best Male Hip-Hop Artist	Won	
2008	Good Life (featuring T-Pain)	Best Collaboration	Won	
2008	Good Life (featuring T-Pain)	Video of the Year	Nominated	
2009	"Heartless"	Video of the Year	Nominated	
2009	"Love Lockdown"	Viewer's Choice	Nominated	
2009	Kanye West	Best Male Hip Hop Artist	Nominated	
2010	"Forever" (with Drake, Lil Wayne & Eminem)	Best Collaboration	Nominated	
2011	"All of the Lights" (featuring Rihanna)	Best Collaboration	Nominated	
2011	"Runaway"	Video of the Year	Nominated	
2011	Kanye West	Best Male Hip-Hop Artist	Won	
2011	Kanye West	Video Director of the Year	Nominated	
2012	Kanye West	Video Director of the Year	Nominated	
2012	"Otis" (with Jay-Z)	Best Collaboration	Nominated	
2012	"Otis" (with Jay-Z)	Viewer's Choice	Nominated	
2012	"Otis" (with Jay-Z)	Video of the Year	Won	
2012	"Niggas in Paris" (with Jay-Z)	Video of the Year	Nominated	
2012	"Marvin & Chardonnay" (with Big Sean & Roscoe Dash)	Best Collaboration	Nominated	
2012	The Throne (with Jay-Z)	Best Group	Won	
2013	The Throne (with Jay-Z)	Best Group	Nominated	
2013	"Mercy" (featuring Big Sean, Pusha T & 2 Chainz)	Video Of The Year	Nominated	
2013	"Mercy" (featuring Big Sean, Pusha T & 2 Chainz)	Best Collaboration	Nominated	
2016	"One Man Can Change the World" (with Big Sean & John Legend)	Best Collaboration	Nominated	
2016	Kanye West	Best Male Hip Hop Artist	Nominated	
2020	"Follow God"	Best Gospel/Inspirational Award	Nominated	
2022	"Come to Life"	Best Gospel/Inspirational Award	Nominated	
2022	Kanye West	Best Male Hip Hop Artist	Nominated	
2022	Donda	Album of the Year	Nominated	
2024	¥$ (with Ty Dolla Sign)	Best Group	Won	
2024	Carnival	Best Collaboration	Nominated	

=== BET Hip Hop Awards ===
The BET Hip Hop Awards are hosted annually by BET for hip hop performers, producers, and music video directors. West has received nineteen awards from eighty-eight nominations.

Year	Nominee / work	Award	Result	Ref.
2006	Late Registration	Hip Hop CD of the Year	Nominated	
2006	Kanye West	Producer of the Year	Nominated	
2006	Kanye West	Best Live Performance	Nominated	
2007	Kanye West	Best Live Performance	Won	
2007	Kanye West	Lyricist of the Year	Nominated	
2007	Kanye West	Producer of the Year	Nominated	
2007	"Stronger"	Best Hip-Hop Video	Won	
2008	"Good Life" (featuring T-Pain)	Best Hip-Hop Video	Won	
2008	"Good Life" (featuring T-Pain)	Track of the Year	Nominated	
2008	"Good Life" (featuring T-Pain)	Best Hip-Hop Collabo	Nominated	
2008	Kanye West	Best Lyricist	Nominated	
2008	Kanye West	MVP of the Year	Nominated	
2008	Kanye West	Best Live Performer	Won	
2008	Graduation	CD of the Year	Nominated	
2008	"Put On" (with Young Jeezy)	People's Champ	Nominated	
2009	"Put On" (with Young Jeezy)	Best Hip-Hop Collabo	Nominated	
2009	808s & Heartbreak	CD of the Year	Nominated	
2009	"Amazing" (featuring Young Jeezy)	People's Champ Award	Nominated	
2009	Kanye West	Best Live Performer	Nominated	
2009	Kanye West	Lyricist of the Year	Nominated	
2009	Kanye West	Producer of the Year	Won	
2009	Kanye West	MVP of the Year	Nominated	
2009	Kanye West	Hustler of the Year	Nominated	
2009	Kanye West	Best Hip Hop Style	Won	
2010	Kanye West	Best Hip Hop Style	Nominated	
2010	Kanye West	Best Live Performer	Nominated	
2010	"Forever" (with Drake, Lil Wayne & Eminem)	Perfect Combo	Nominated	
2011	"All of the Lights" (featuring Rihanna)	Best Hip-Hop Video	Nominated	
2011	"All of the Lights" (featuring Rihanna)	Viewer's Choice	Nominated	
2011	My Beautiful Dark Twisted Fantasy	CD of the Year	Won	
2011	Kanye West	Best Live Performer	Nominated	
2011	Kanye West	Hustler of the Year	Nominated	
2011	Kanye West	Best Hip-Hop Style	Nominated	
2011	Kanye West	Lyricist of the Year	Nominated	
2011	Kanye West	Video Director of the Year	Nominated	
2011	Kanye West	MVP of the Year	Nominated	
2011	Kanye West	Producer of the Year	Nominated	
2012	Kanye West	Producer of the Year	Won	
2012	Kanye West	Lyricist of the Year	Nominated	
2012	Kanye West	MVP of the Year	Nominated	
2012	Kanye West	Best Live Performer	Nominated	
2012	Kanye West	Hustler of the Year	Nominated	
2012	Kanye West	Best Hip-Hop Style	Won	
2012	Kanye West	Video Director of the Year	Nominated	
2012	"Mercy" (featuring Big Sean, Pusha T & 2 Chainz)	Best Club Banger	Nominated	
2012	"Mercy" (featuring Big Sean, Pusha T & 2 Chainz)	Reese's Perfect Combo Award	Won	
2012	"Mercy" (featuring Big Sean, Pusha T & 2 Chainz)	Best Hip-Hop Video	Nominated	
2012	"Mercy" (featuring Big Sean, Pusha T & 2 Chainz)	People's Champ Award	Nominated	
2012	Otis (with Jay-Z)	People's Champ Award	Nominated	
2012	Watch The Throne	CD of the Year	Won	
2012	"Niggas In Paris" (with Jay-Z)	Track of the Year	Won	
2012	"Niggas In Paris" (with Jay-Z)	Best Club Banger	Won	
2012	The Throne (with Jay-Z)	Best Live Performer	Won	
2012	"Murder to Excellence" (with Jay-Z)	Impact Track	Nominated	
2013	"Black Skinhead"	Impact Track	Nominated	
2013	Kanye West	Best Hip-Hop Style	Nominated	
2013	Kanye West	Hustler of the Year	Nominated	
2013	Kanye West	Best Live Performer	Nominated	
2014	Kanye West	Best Live Performer	Won	
2014	Kanye West	Best Hip-Hop Style	Nominated	
2015	Kanye West	Best Hip-Hop Style	Nominated	
2015	Kanye West	Producer of the Year	Nominated	
2015	Kanye West	Best Live Performer	Nominated	
2015	"Blessings" (with Big Sean & Drake)	Best Collabo, Duo or Group	Won	
2015	"Blessings" (with Big Sean & Drake)	People's Champ Award	Won	
2015	"Blessings" (with Big Sean & Drake)	Best Hip Hop Video	Nominated	
2015	"I Don't Fuck with You" (as producer)	Best Club Banger	Won	
2015	"I Don't Fuck with You" (as producer)	Track of the Year	Nominated	
2015	"One Man Can Change The World" (with Big Sean & John Legend)	Impact Track	Nominated	
2016	Kanye West	Best Live Performer	Nominated	
2016	Kanye West	Lyricist of the Year	Nominated	
2016	Kanye West	Video Director of the Year	Nominated	
2016	Kanye West	MVP of the Year	Nominated	
2016	Kanye West	Hustler of the Year	Nominated	
2016	Kanye West	Best Hip-Hop Style	Won	
2016	"Famous" (featuring Rihanna)	Best Hip Hop Video	Nominated	
2016	The Life of Pablo	Album of the Year	Nominated	
2022	Hot Shit (with Cardi B & Lil Durk)	Best Hip Hop Video	Nominated	
2022	Hot Shit (with Cardi B & Lil Durk)	Best Collaboration	Nominated	
2022	Hot Shit (with Cardi B & Lil Durk)	Song of the Year	Nominated	
2022	City of Gods	Sweet 16: Best Featured Verse	Nominated	
2022	City of Gods	Impact Track	Nominated	
2022	Donda	Album of the Year	Nominated	
2022	Kanye West	Producer of the Year	Nominated	
2022	Kanye West	Best Live Performer	Nominated	
2022	Kanye West	Hustler of the Year	Nominated	
2022	Kanye West	Hip Hop Artist of the Year	Nominated	
2024	¥$	Best Duo/Group	Nominated	

=== BET Honors ===
BET Honors were established in 2008 by the Black Entertainment Television network to grace the lives and achievements of African-American luminaries. The awards are presented annually during Black History Month. West has received one award.

Year	Nominee / work	Award	Result	Ref.
2015	Kanye West	Visionary Award	Won	

== Berlin Music Video Awards ==
The Berlin Music Video Awards is an international festival that promotes the art of music videos.

Year	Nominee / work	Award	Result	Ref.
2022	CITY OF GODS	Best Cinematography	Nominated	

== Billboard Awards ==
=== Billboard.com Mid-Year Music Awards ===
The Billboard.com Mid-Year Music Awards are held by Billboard to recognize the most favorite artists, songs, albums and performances of the first half of the year. Winners are selected through a poll on Billboard's official website. West has received four nominations.

Year	Nominee / work	Award	Result	Ref.
2011	Kanye West at Coachella	Best Festival Performance	Nominated	
2012	Kanye West's GOOD Music Album The best album of the year	Most Anticipated Event of 2012's Second Half	Nominated	
2013	Kanye West at Governors Ball	Best Festival Performance	Nominated	
2013	Kanye West Projects New Song on Buildings Around The World	Coolest Marketing Stunt	Nominated	

=== Billboard Music Awards ===
The Billboard Music Awards are held to honor artists for commercial performance in the U.S., based on record charts published by Billboard. West has received eighteen awards from forty one nominations.

Year	Nominee / work	Award	Result	Ref.
2004	The College Dropout	R&B/Hip-Hop Album of the Year	Nominated	
2004	Kanye West	R&B/Hip-Hop Singles Artist of the Year	Nominated	
2004	Kanye West	R&B/Hip-Hop Artist of the Year	Nominated	
2004	Kanye West	Hot 100 Songwriter of the Year	Nominated	
2004	Kanye West	R&B/Hip-Hop producer of the year	Won	
2004	Kanye West	Rap Artist of the Year	Won	
2004	Kanye West	New R&B/Hip-Hop Artist of the Year	Won	
2004	Kanye West	New Male Artist of the Year	Won	
2005	Kanye West	Artist Achievement Award	Won	
2011	My Beautiful Dark Twisted Fantasy	Top Rap Album	Nominated	
2012	"E.T." (with Katy Perry)	Top Digital Song	Nominated	
2012	"E.T." (with Katy Perry)	Top Hot 100 Song	Nominated	
2012	"E.T." (with Katy Perry)	Top Pop Song	Nominated	
2012	Watch The Throne (with Jay-Z)	Top Rap Album	Nominated	
2013	"Mercy" (featuring Big Sean, Pusha T & 2 Chainz)	Top Rap Song	Nominated	
2017	Kanye West	Top Rap Tour	Nominated	
2020	Kanye West	Top Gospel Artist	Won	
2020	Kanye West	Top Christian Artist	Nominated	
2020	Jesus Is King	Top Gospel Album	Won	
2020	Jesus Is King	Top Christian Album	Won	
2020	"Follow God"	Top Christian Song	Nominated	
2020	"Follow God"	Top Gospel Song	Won	
2020	"Selah"	Top Gospel Song	Nominated	
2020	"On God"	Top Gospel Song	Nominated	
2020	"Closed on Sunday"	Top Gospel Song	Nominated	
2021	Kanye West	Top Gospel Artist	Won	
2021	"Wash Us in the Blood" (featuring Travis Scott)	Top Gospel Song	Won	
2022	Top Christian Artist	Kanye West	Won	
2022	Top Gospel Artist	Kanye West	Won	
2022	Donda	Top Rap Album	Nominated	
2022	Donda	Top Christian Album	Won	
2022	Donda	Top Gospel Album	Won	
2022	"Moon"	Top Christian Song	Nominated	
2022	"Off the Grid"	Top Christian Song	Nominated	
2022	"Praise God"	Top Christian Song	Nominated	
2022	"Hurricane"	Top Christian Song	Won	
2022	"Hurricane"	Top Gospel Song	Won	
2022	“Moon”	Top Gospel Song	Nominated	
2022	“Off the Grid”	Top Gospel Song	Nominated	
2022	"Praise God"	Top Gospel Song	Nominated	
2023	Kanye West	Top Gospel Artist	Won	

=== Billboard R&B/Hip-Hop Awards ===
The Billboard R&B/Hip-Hop Awards honored the most popular albums, songs, artists, songwriters, producers and major/independent labels. The awards were based on sales data from Nielsen SoundScan and radio airplay information from Nielsen Broadcast Data Systems. West received two awards from eleven nominations.

Year	Nominee / work	Award	Result	Ref.
2004	Kanye West	Top Songwriter	Nominated	
2004	Kanye West	Top New R&B/Hip-Hop Artist	Nominated	
2004	Kanye West	Top Producer	Nominated	
2005	Kanye West	Top Producer	Nominated	
2006	Kanye West	Top R&B/Hip-Hop Artist	Nominated	
2006	Kanye West	Top Male R&B/Hip-Hop Artist	Nominated	
2006	Kanye West	Hot R&B/Hip-Hop Albums Artist	Nominated	
2006	Late Registration	Top R&B/Hip-Hop Album	Nominated	
2006	Late Registration	Top Rap Album	Won	
2006	"Gold Digger" (featuring Jamie Foxx)	Hot R&B/Hip-Hop Song	Nominated	
2006	"Gold Digger" (featuring Jamie Foxx)	Hot Rap Track	Won	

=== Billboard R&B/Hip-Hop Power Players Event ===
The Billboard R&B/Hip-Hop Power Players Event honors the Top 100 artists and executives who are driving, influencing and defining hip-hop culture today. West has received two awards.

Year	Nominee / work	Award	Result	Ref.
2017	Kanye West	Labels (CEO, G.O.O.D. Music)	Won	
2018	Kanye West	Labels (CEO, G.O.O.D. Music)	Won	

== Black Reel Awards ==
The Black Reel Awards is an awards ceremony hosted by the Foundation for the Augmentation of African-Americans in Film (FAAAF), and annually spotlights black cinematic excellence in films and performances in theatrical, independent, television and world cinema films. West has received two nominations.

Year	Nominee / work	Award	Result	Ref.
2011	"Run This Town" (with Jay-Z & Rihanna)	Best Original or Adapted Song	Nominated	
2013	"No Church in the Wild" (with Jay-Z & Frank Ocean)	Best Original or Adapted Song	Nominated	

== BMI Awards ==
The BMI Awards are annual award ceremonies for songwriters in various genres organized by Broadcast Music, Inc. West has received four Gospel awards, six London awards, six Pop awards and thirty-eight R&B/Hip-Hop (formerly Urban) awards.

=== BMI Gospel Awards ===
Year	Nominee / work	Award	Result	Ref.
2021	Kanye West	Songwriter of the Year	Won	
2021	"Hands On"	Award Winning Songs	Won	
2021	"On God"	Award Winning Songs	Won	
2021	"Selah"	Award Winning Songs	Won	

=== BMI London Awards ===
Year	Nominee / work	Award	Result	Ref.
2006	"Diamonds From Sierra Leone"	Pop Awards	Won	
2008	"Stronger"	Pop Awards	Won	
2008	"Stronger"	Urban Awards	Won	
2009	"American Boy" (with Estelle)	Pop Awards	Won	
2010	"Run This Town" (with Jay-Z & Rihanna)	Pop Awards	Won	
2017	"That Part" (with Schoolboy Q)	Pop Awards	Won	

=== BMI Pop Awards ===
Year	Nominee / work	Award	Result	Ref.
2006	"Overnight Celebrity" (with Twista)	Award Winning Songs	Won	
2007	"Gold Digger" (featuring Jamie Foxx)	Award Winning Songs	Won	
2008	"Stronger"	Award Winning Songs	Won	
2010	"American Boy" (with Estelle)	Award Winning Songs	Won	
2010	"Heartless"	Award Winning Songs	Won	
2010	"Knock You Down" (with Keri Hilson & Ne-Yo)	Award Winning Songs	Won	
2022	"Industry Baby" (as songwriter)	Award Winning Songs	Won	

=== BMI R&B/Hip-Hop Awards ===
Year	Nominee / work	Award	Result	Ref.
2004	Kanye West	Top Urban Producers	Won	
2005	Kanye West	Producer of the Year	Won	
2005	"Jesus Walks"	Award Winning Songs	Won	
2005	"Overnight Celebrity" (with Twista)	Award Winning Songs	Won	
2005	"Through The Wire"	Award Winning Songs	Won	
2005	"You Don't Know My Name" (as songwriter)	Award Winning Songs	Won	
2006	"Gold Digger" (featuring Jamie Foxx)	Award Winning Songs	Won	
2006	Kanye West	Producer of the Year	Won	
2007	"Unbreakable" (as songwriter)	Award Winning Songs	Won	
2008	"Good Life" (featuring T-Pain)	Award Winning Songs	Won	
2008	"Stronger"	Award Winning Songs	Won	
2008	Kanye West	Producer of the Year	Won	
2009	Kanye West	Producer of the Year	Won	
2009	"Flashing Lights"	Award Winning Songs	Won	
2009	"Put On" (with Young Jeezy)	Award Winning Songs	Won	
2010	Kanye West	Top Urban Producers	Won	
2010	"Forever" (with Drake, Lil Wayne & Eminem)	Award Winning Songs	Won	
2010	"Heartless"	Award Winning Songs	Won	
2010	"Knock You Down" (with Keri Hilson & Ne-Yo)	Award Winning Songs	Won	
2010	"Run This Town" (with Jay-Z & Rihanna)	Award Winning Songs	Won	
2011	"Find Your Love" (as songwriter)	Award Winning Songs	Won	
2011	Kanye West	Top Urban Producers	Won	
2012	Kanye West	Top Urban Producers	Won	
2012	"All of the Lights" (featuring Rihanna)	Award Winning Songs	Won	
2012	"Niggas In Paris" (with Jay-Z)	Award Winning Songs	Won	
2012	"Work Out" (as songwriter)	Award Winning Songs	Won	
2013	"Marvin & Chardonnay" (with Big Sean & Roscoe Dash)	Award Winning Songs	Won	
2013	"Mercy" (featuring Big Sean, Pusha T & 2 Chainz)	Award Winning Songs	Won	
2013	"Party" (as songwriter)	Award Winning Songs	Won	
2014	"Clique" (featuring Big Sean & Jay-Z)	Award Winning Songs	Won	
2015	"I Don't Fuck with You" (as songwriter)	Award Winning Songs	Won	
2016	"Bitch Better Have My Money" (as songwriter)	Award Winning Songs	Won	
2016	"FourFiveSeconds" (with Rihanna & Paul McCartney)	Award Winning Songs	Won	
2017	"Father Stretch My Hands Pt.1"	Award Winning Songs	Won	
2017	"Pop Style" (with Drake & Jay-Z)	Award Winning Songs	Won	
2018	"Bounce Back (as songwriter)	Award Winning Songs	Won	
2022	"Industry Baby" (as songwriter)	Award Winning Songs	Won	
2022	Kanye West	Top Producers	Won	

== Brit Awards ==
The Brit Awards are the British Phonographic Industry's (BPI) annual pop music awards. West has received three awards from ten nominations.

Year	Nominee / work	Award	Result	Ref.
2005	Kanye West	International Breakthrough Act	Nominated	
2005	Kanye West	International Male Solo Artist	Nominated	
2006	Late Registration	International Album	Nominated	
2006	Kanye West	International Male Solo Artist	Won	
2008	Kanye West	International Male Solo Artist	Won	
2009	Kanye West	International Male Solo Artist	Won	
2009	"American Boy" (with Estelle)	Single of the Year	Nominated	
2010	"Gold Digger" (2006 Brit Awards)	Best Live Performance at the Brit Awards	Nominated	
2011	Kanye West	International Male Solo Artist	Nominated	
2012	Kanye West & Jay-Z	International Group	Nominated	

== Clio Awards ==
The Clio Awards is an annual award program that recognizes innovation and creative excellence in advertising, design and communication, as judged by an international panel of advertising professionals. West has received five awards from six nominations.

Year	Nominee / work	Award	Result	Ref.
2015	Kanye West x adidas Livestream	Runway Shows/Presentations	Nominated	
2016	adidas + Kanye West	Partnerships	Won	
2016	Heartless (The Girl on the Train)	Trailers (Theatrical/Television/ Gaming)	Won	
2017	The Life of Pablo Album Experience	Innovation	Won	
2017	The Life of Pablo Album Experience	Integrated Campaign	Won	
2017	YEEZY Season 3 & Premiere of Life of Pablo	Fashion: Events/Experiential	Won	

== Danish Music Awards ==
The Danish Music Awards (DMA) is a Danish award show established by IFPI Denmark in 1989. West has received three nominations.

Year	Nominee / work	Award	Result	Ref.
2006	Late Registration	International Album of the Year	Nominated	
2012	Watch The Throne	International Album of the Year	Nominated	
2013	Yeezus	International Album of the Year	Nominated	

== Designs of the Year Awards ==
The Beazley Designs of the Year Awards is an annual exhibition and awards honouring the very best in innovative design across six categories: Architecture, Digital, Fashion, Graphics, Product and Transport. West has received one nomination.

Year	Nominee / work	Award	Result	Ref.
2017	The Life of Pablo merchandise and pop-up stores	Fashion	Nominated	

== Dieline Awards ==
The Dieline Awards recognizes the best in consumer product packaging design worldwide, celebrating innovation and honouring excellence in packaging design. West has received one award.

Year	Nominee / work	Award	Result	Ref.
2012	Watch the Throne	Dieline Package Design Award	Won	

== Dove Awards ==
The Dove Awards celebrate achievement in Christian music and are awarded by the Gospel Music Association (GMA). West has received one award from three nominations.

Year	Nominee / work	Award	Result	Ref.
2020	Jesus Is King	Rap/Hip Hop Album of the Year	Nominated	
2020	Jesus Is Born (as producer)	Traditional Gospel Album of the Year	Nominated	
2020	"Follow God"	Rap/Hip Hop Recorded Song of the Year	Won	

== ECHO Awards ==
The ECHO Music Awards began in 1992 by German Phonoakademie, the cultural institute of the German Music Industry Association (BVMI), to recognize "outstanding and successful works of national and international music artists". West has received one nomination.

Year	Nominee / work	Award	Result	Ref.
2008	Graduation	Artist of the Year Hip-Hop / R&B	Nominated	

== Esky Music Awards ==
The Esky Music Awards were awarded annually by Esquire magazine. West received two awards.

Year	Nominee / work	Award	Result	Ref.
2005	Kanye West	Best Visionary	Won	
2005	Kanye West	Best MC	Won	

== FN Achievement Awards ==
The Footwear News Achievement Awards, established in 1986, are an annual "Shoe Oscars" hosted by Footwear News that honor the industry's best shoes. West has received one award.

Year	Nominee / work	Award	Result	Ref.
2015	Adidas Yeezy Boost 350	Shoe of the Year	Won	

== Fonogram Hungarian Music Awards ==
The Fonogram Hungarian Music Awards were founded in 1992 to honor and recognize the musical achievements of performers in Hungary. The awards are presented by Mahasz, the Hungarian music industry association. West has received two awards from five nominations.

Year	Nominee / work	Award	Result	Ref.
2006	Late Registration	Best Foreign Rap or Hip-Hop Album of the Year	Won	
2008	Graduation	Best Foreign Rap or Hip-Hop Album of the Year	Won	
2009	808s & Heartbreak	Best Foreign Dance or Pop Album	Nominated	
2014	Yeezus	Best Foreign Rap or Hip-Hop Album of the Year	Nominated	
2019	Ye	Best Foreign Rap or Hip-Hop Album of the Year	Nominated	

== Glamour Awards ==
The Glamour Awards are annual awards hosted by Glamour magazine. West has received one award.

Year	Nominee / work	Award	Result	Ref.
2009	Kanye West	Man of the Year	Won	

== Grammy Awards ==
The Grammy Awards are awarded annually by The Recording Academy to honor outstanding achievements in the music industry, and are considered the music industry's highest honor. West has received 24 awards from 77 nominations.

Year	Nominee / work	Award	Result	Ref.
2005	Kanye West	Best New Artist	Nominated	
2005	"Jesus Walks"	Song of the Year	Nominated	
2005	"Jesus Walks"	Best Rap Song	Won	
2005	The College Dropout	Best Rap Album	Won	
2005	The College Dropout	Album of the Year	Nominated	
2005	The Diary of Alicia Keys (as producer)	Album of the Year	Nominated	
2005	"Through the Wire"	Best Rap Solo Performance	Nominated	
2005	"You Don't Know My Name" (as songwriter)	Best R&B Song	Won	
2005	"All Falls Down" (featuring Syleena Johnson)	Best Rap/Sung Collaboration	Nominated	
2005	"Slow Jamz" (with Twista & Jamie Foxx)	Best Rap/Sung Collaboration	Nominated	
2006	"They Say" (with Common & John Legend)	Best Rap/Sung Collaboration	Nominated	
2006	"Unbreakable" (as songwriter)	Best R&B Song	Nominated	
2006	"Diamonds from Sierra Leone"	Best Rap Song	Won	
2006	"Gold Digger" (featuring Jamie Foxx)	Record of the Year	Nominated	
2006	"Gold Digger" (featuring Jamie Foxx)	Best Rap Solo Performance	Won	
2006	Late Registration	Best Rap Album	Won	
2006	Late Registration	Album of the Year	Nominated	
2006	The Emancipation of Mimi (as producer)	Album of the Year	Nominated	
2008	Graduation	Album of the Year	Nominated	
2008	Graduation	Best Rap Album	Won	
2008	"Better Than I've Ever Been" (with Nas, Rakim & KRS-One)	Best Rap Performance by a Duo or Group	Nominated	
2008	"Southside" (with Common)	Best Rap Performance by a Duo or Group	Won	
2008	"Stronger"	Best Rap Solo Performance	Won	
2008	"Can't Tell Me Nothing"	Best Rap Song	Nominated	
2008	"Good Life" (featuring T-Pain)	Best Rap Song	Won	
2008	"Good Life" (featuring T-Pain)	Best Rap/Sung Collaboration	Nominated	
2009	"American Boy" (with Estelle)	Best Rap/Sung Collaboration	Won	
2009	"American Boy" (with Estelle)	Song of the Year	Nominated	
2009	Tha Carter III (as producer)	Album of the Year	Nominated	
2009	"Swagga like Us" (with T.I., Jay-Z & Lil Wayne)	Best Rap Song	Nominated	
2009	"Swagga like Us" (with T.I., Jay-Z & Lil Wayne)	Best Rap Performance by a Duo or Group	Won	
2009	"Put On" (with Young Jeezy)	Best Rap Performance by a Duo or Group	Nominated	
2010	"Amazing" (featuring Young Jeezy)	Best Rap Performance by a Duo or Group	Nominated	
2010	"Make Her Say" (with Kid Cudi & Common)	Best Rap Performance by a Duo or Group	Nominated	
2010	"Ego" (with Beyoncé)	Best Rap/Sung Collaboration	Nominated	
2010	"Knock You Down" (with Keri Hilson & Ne-Yo)	Best Rap/Sung Collaboration	Nominated	
2010	"Run This Town" (with Jay-Z & Rihanna)	Best Rap/Sung Collaboration	Won	
2010	"Run This Town" (with Jay-Z & Rihanna)	Best Rap Song	Won	
2011	"Power"	Best Rap Solo Performance	Nominated	
2012	Watch the Throne (with Jay-Z)	Best Rap Album	Nominated	
2012	My Beautiful Dark Twisted Fantasy	Best Rap Album	Won	
2012	"All of the Lights" (featuring Rihanna, Kid Cudi & Fergie)	Song of the Year	Nominated	
2012	"All of the Lights" (featuring Rihanna, Kid Cudi & Fergie)	Best Rap/Sung Collaboration	Won	
2012	"All of the Lights" (featuring Rihanna, Kid Cudi & Fergie)	Best Rap Song	Won	
2012	"Otis" (with Jay-Z)	Best Rap Song	Nominated	
2012	"Otis" (with Jay-Z)	Best Rap Performance	Won	
2013	"Niggas in Paris" (with Jay-Z)	Best Rap Performance	Won	
2013	"Niggas in Paris" (with Jay-Z)	Best Rap Song	Won	
2013	"Mercy" (featuring Big Sean, Pusha T & 2 Chainz)	Best Rap Song	Nominated	
2013	"Mercy" (featuring Big Sean, Pusha T & 2 Chainz)	Best Rap Performance	Nominated	
2013	"No Church in the Wild" (with Jay-Z, Frank Ocean & The-Dream)	Best Rap/Sung Collaboration	Won	
2013	"No Church in the Wild" (with Jay-Z, Frank Ocean & The-Dream)	Best Short Form Music Video	Nominated	
2014	"New Slaves"	Best Rap Song	Nominated	
2014	Yeezus	Best Rap Album	Nominated	
2015	"Bound 2" (featuring Charlie Wilson)	Best Rap/Sung Collaboration	Nominated	
2015	"Bound 2" (featuring Charlie Wilson)	Best Rap Song	Nominated	
2016	"All Day" (featuring Theophilus London, Allan Kingdom, & Paul McCartney)	Best Rap Song	Nominated	
2016	"All Day" (featuring Theophilus London, Allan Kingdom, & Paul McCartney)	Best Rap Performance	Nominated	
2016	"One Man Can Change the World" (with Big Sean & John Legend)	Best Rap/Sung Collaboration	Nominated	
2016	Beauty Behind the Madness (as producer)	Album of the Year	Nominated	
2017	Views (as producer)	Album of the Year	Nominated	
2017	"That Part" (with Schoolboy Q)	Best Rap Performance	Nominated	
2017	"Pop Style" (with Drake & Jay-Z)	Best Rap Performance	Nominated	
2017	"Famous" (featuring Rihanna)	Best Rap Song	Nominated	
2017	"Famous" (featuring Rihanna)	Best Rap/Sung Performance	Nominated	
2017	"Ultralight Beam" (featuring Chance the Rapper, Kirk Franklin, Kelly Price & The-Dream)	Best Rap/Sung Performance	Nominated	
2017	"Ultralight Beam" (featuring Chance the Rapper, Kirk Franklin, Kelly Price & The-Dream)	Best Rap Song	Nominated	
2017	The Life of Pablo	Best Rap Album	Nominated	
2019	Kanye West	Producer of the Year, Non-Classical	Nominated	
2021	Jesus Is King	Best Contemporary Christian Music Album	Won	
2022	"Hurricane"	Best Melodic Rap Performance	Won	
2022	"Jail"	Best Rap Song	Won	
2022	Donda	Best Rap Album	Nominated	
2022	Donda	Album of the Year	Nominated	
2022	Montero (as producer)	Album of the Year	Nominated	
2025	"Carnival"	Best Rap Song	Nominated	
2027	Bully - Deluxe	Best Rap Album	Pending	

== GQ Awards ==
=== GQ Men of the Year Awards ===
|The GQ Men of the Year Awards are given annually by British men's magazine GQ, celebrating progressive thinkers and people who have excelled in their field. West has received one award.

Year	Nominee / work	Award	Result	Ref.
2007	Kanye West	International Man of the Year	Won	

The GQ Most Stylish Man award was established in 2014. Presented annually, sixty-four contestants are entered in a tournament, with the public voting for its winner. West has received two awards from four nominations.

Year	Nominee / work	Award	Result	Ref.
2014	Kanye West	Most Stylish Man	Won	
2015	Kanye West	Most Stylish Man	Won	
2016	Kanye West	Most Stylish Man	Nominated	
2017	Kanye West	Most Stylish Man	Nominated	

== HipHopDX Awards ==
The HipHopDX Awards are annual year-end awards hosted by online Hip-Hop magazine HipHopDX. West has won twelve awards from twenty-six nominations.

Year	Nominee / work	Award	Result	Ref.
2005	Kanye West	Producer of the Year	Won	
2005	Late Registration	Album of the Year	Nominated	
2007	Graduation	Album of the Year	Won	
2008	"Flashing Lights"	Video of the Year	Nominated	
2008	Kanye West	Producer of the Year	Nominated	
2008	"Put On" (with Young Jeezy)	Collaboration of the Year	Nominated	
2009	"Forever" (with Drake, Lil Wayne & Eminem)	Collaboration of the Year	Won	
2009	"Welcome to Heartbreak"	Video of the Year	Nominated	
2010	My Beautiful Dark Twisted Fantasy	Album of the Year	Won	
2010	My Beautiful Dark Twisted Fantasy	Reader's Choice: Best Album	Won	
2010	"Monster" (featuring Rick Ross, Jay-Z, Nicki Minaj & Bon Iver)	Collaboration of the Year	Won	
2010	Kanye West	Producer of the Year	Won	
2011	Watch the Throne Tour	Tour of the Year	Won	
2011	"Otis" (with Jay-Z)	Video of the year	Nominated	
2012	"Mercy" (featuring Big Sean, Pusha T & 2 Chainz)	Collaboration of the Year	Won	
2013	Yeezus	Album of the Year	Nominated	
2013	"Numbers on the Boards" (co-produced with Don Cannon)	Beat of the Year	Won	
2013	Interview of the Year	Zane Lowe & Kanye West on BBC Radio1	Won	
2013	Interview of the Year	Kanye West on Sway In The Morning	Nominated	
2013	Story of the Year	All Kanye Everything	Nominated	
2013	Kanye West Takes Issue With Jimmy Kimmel	Tweet of the Year	Won	
2014	"Sanctified" (Co-produced with DJ Mustard)	Beat of the Year	Nominated	
2021	Kanye West	Best Comeback	Nominated	
2021	"Jail"	Best Beat	Nominated	
2021	"Life of the Party"	Best HipHop Song	Nominated	
2021	"Off the Grid"	Best HipHop Collab	Nominated	

== iHeartRadio Music Awards ==
The iHeartRadio Music Awards is an international music awards show founded by iHeartRadio in 2014. West has received two nominations.

Year	Nominee / work	Award	Result	Ref.
2016	"Blessings" (with Big Sean & Drake)	Hip Hop Song of the Year	Nominated	
2016	Kanye West	Most Meme-able Moment	Nominated	

== International Dance Music Awards ==
The International Dance Music Awards, established in 1965, are part of the Winter Music Conference, a weeklong electronic music event held annually. West has received three awards from nine nominations.

Year	Nominee / work	Award	Result	Ref.
2006	"Gold Digger" (featuring Jamie Foxx)	Best Rap/Hip Hop Dance Track	Won	
2008	"Stronger"	Best Rap/Hip Hop Dance Track	Won	
2009	"Love Lockdown"	Best Rap/Hip Hop Dance Track	Won	
2009	"Love Lockdown"	Best R&B/Urban Dance Track	Nominated	
2009	"American Boy" (with Estelle)	Best R&B/Urban Dance Track	Nominated	
2010	"Run This Town" (with Jay-Z & Rihanna)	Best Rap/Hip Hop/Trap Dance Track	Nominated	
2012	"All of the Lights" (featuring Rihanna)	Best Rap/Hip Hop/Trap Dance Track	Nominated	
2013	"Mercy" (featuring Big Sean, Pusha T & 2 Chainz)	Best Rap/Hip Hop/Trap Dance Track	Nominated	
2016	"All Day" (featuring Allan Kingdom, Theophilus London & Paul McCartney)	Best Rap/Hip Hop/Trap Dance Track	Nominated	

== Kiss Awards ==
The Kiss 100 Radio Awards were a 2005 award show presented by UK radio station Kiss. West received three awards from five nominations.

Year	Nominee / work	Award	Result	Ref.
2005	Kanye West	Hottest Producer	Won	
2005	Kanye West	Style Icon	Won	
2005	Kanye West	Best Male Artist	Nominated	
2005	Late Registration	Best Album	Won	
2005	"Gold Digger" (featuring Jamie Foxx)	Most Wanted Download	Nominated	

== Meteor Music Awards ==
The Meteor Music Awards, launched in 2001, were awarded for achievements in the Irish and international record industry until their end in 2010. West received one award from four nominations.

Year	Nominee / work	Award	Result	Ref.
2005	Kanye West	Best International Male	Nominated	
2006	Kanye West	Best International Male	Won	
2008	Kanye West	Best International Male	Nominated	
2009	Kanye West	Best International Male	Nominated	

== Million Man March Image Award ==
The Million Man March Award was a 2005 award given to men and women in recognition of their strides and accomplishments in the Black community in the fields of politics, business, religion and entertainment. The award was given to mark the 10th Anniversary of the Million Man March. West has received one award.

Year	Nominee / work	Award	Result	Ref.
2005	Kanye West	Million Man March Image Award	Won	

== MOBO Awards ==
The MOBO Awards (an acronym for "Music of Black Origin"), first presented in 1996, are held annually in the United Kingdom to recognize artists who perform black music. West has received six awards from twenty-one nominations.

Year	Nominee / work	Award	Result	Ref.
2004	"All Falls Down" (featuring Syleena Johnson)	Best Single	Nominated	
2004	"All Falls Down" (featuring Syleena Johnson)	Best Video	Nominated	
2004	"Talk About Our Love" (with Brandy)	Best Collaboration	Nominated	
2004	"Slow Jamz" (with Twists & Jamie Foxx)	Best Collaboration	Nominated	
2004	The College Dropout	Best Album	Won	
2004	Kanye West	Best Producer	Won	
2004	Kanye West	Best Hip-Hop Act	Won	
2006	Kanye West	Best Hip-Hop Act	Nominated	
2006	Kanye West	Best International Male	Nominated	
2007	Kanye West	Best International Artist	Nominated	
2007	Kanye West	Best Hip-Hop Act	Won	
2007	"Stronger"	Best Video	Won	
2008	Kanye West	Best International Act	Nominated	
2008	"American Boy" (with Estelle)	Best Song	Won	
2009	808's & Heartbreak	Best Album	Nominated	
2009	Kanye West	Best Hip Hop Act	Nominated	
2009	Kanye West	Best International Act	Nominated	
2012	Kanye West	Best International Act	Nominated	
2013	Kanye West	Best International Act	Nominated	
2016	Kanye West	Best International Act	Nominated	
2021	Kanye West	Best International Act	Nominated	

== MP3.com Awards ==
The MP3.com Readers Choice Awards acknowledged artists for their popularity as noted by MP3.com's community of passionate music enthusiasts. West received two awards.

Year	Nominee / work	Award	Result	Ref.
2006	Late Registration	Best Album	Won	
2006	"Gold Digger" (featuring Jamie Foxx)	Best Single	Won	

== MP3 Music Awards ==
The MP3 Music Award is an annual awards ceremony established in 2007 to celebrate the most popular artists, bands, MP3 players and MP3 retailers in today's world of music. West has received two nominations.

Year	Nominee / work	Award	Result	Ref.
2011	"All of the Lights" (featuring Rihanna)	Best Hip Hop/R&B/Rap	Won	
2012	"Otis" (with Jay-Z)	Best Hip Hop/R&B/Rap	Nominated	

== MTV Awards ==
=== MTV Africa Awards ===
The MTV Africa Music Awards (MAMAs), established in 2008, honour the best contemporary music across Africa. West has received one nomination.

Year	Nominee / work	Award	Result	Ref.
2009	Kanye West	Best Hip-Hop	Nominated	

=== MTV Asia Awards ===
Established in 2002, the MTV Asia Awards gave recognition and awards to Asian and international artists in achievement, cinema, fashion, humanitarian, and music. West received three nominations.

Year	Nominee / work	Award	Result	Ref.
2006	"Gold Digger"	Favorite Video	Nominated	
2006	Kanye West	Favorite Male Artist	Nominated	
2008	Kanye West	The Innovation Award	Nominated	

=== MTV Australia Awards ===
The MTV Australia Awards was an annual awards ceremony established in 2005 by MTV Australia and ran till 2009. West received four nominations.

Year	Nominee / work	Award	Result	Ref.
2006	"Gold Digger"	Best Male Video	Nominated	
2006	"Gold Digger"	Best Hip-Hop Video	Nominated	
2006	"Gold Digger"	Song of the Year	Nominated	
2009	"American Boy" (with Estelle)	Best Collaboration	Nominated	

=== MTV Europe Music Awards ===
The MTV Europe Music Awards were established in 1994 by MTV Europe to recognize excellence in music videos from European and international artists. West has received three awards from twenty-four nominations.

Year	Nominee / work	Award	Result	Ref.
2004	Kanye West	Best Hip-Hop	Nominated	
2005	Kanye West	Best Hip-Hop	Nominated	
2006	Kanye West	Best Hip-Hop	Won	
2006	Kanye West	Best Male	Nominated	
2006	"Touch the Sky"	Best Video	Nominated	
2007	"Stronger"	Best Video	Nominated	
2007	Kanye West	Best Urban	Nominated	
2008	Kanye West	Best Male	Won	
2008	Kanye West	Best Urban	Won	
2009	Kanye West	Best Urban	Nominated	
2010	Kanye West	Best Hip-Hop	Nominated	
2010	Kanye West	Best Male	Nominated	
2011	Kanye West	Best Male	Nominated	
2011	Kanye West & Jay-Z	Best Hip-Hop	Nominated	
2012	Kanye West & Jay-Z	Best Hip-Hop	Nominated	
2012	Kanye West & Jay-Z	Best Live	Nominated	
2012	Kanye West	Best Male	Nominated	
2013	Kanye West	Best Hip-Hop	Nominated	
2014	Kanye West	Best Hip-Hop	Nominated	
2015	Kanye West	Best Male	Nominated	
2015	Kanye West	Best Hip-Hop	Nominated	
2016	Kanye West	Best Hip-Hop	Nominated	
2016	"Famous"	Best Video	Nominated	
2021	Kanye West	Best Hip Hop	Nominated	

=== MTV Italian Music Awards ===
The MTV Italian Music Awards, also known as TRL (Total Request Live) Awards, are hosted annually in Italy by MTV. They award the best video, performers, and artists of the year. West has received one award.

Year	Nominee / work	Award	Result	Ref.
2006	Kanye West	TRL's Man of The Year	Won	

=== MTV Millennial Awards ===
The MTV Millennial Awards, held annually in Latin America, were established in 2013 by MTV Latino to award music artists. West has received one nomination.

Year	Nominee / work	Award	Result	Ref.
2016	Kanye West Announces Presidential Run	Viral Bomb	Nominated	

=== MTV Movie Awards ===
The MTV Movie Awards is a film awards show presented annually by MTV. West has received one nomination.

Year	Nominee / work	Award	Result	Ref.
2014	Kanye West	Best Cameo (Anchorman 2: The Legend Continues)	Nominated	

=== MTV Video Music Awards ===
The MTV Video Music Awards (VMAs) were established in 1984 by MTV to celebrate the top music videos of the year. West has received five awards from forty nominations.

Year	Nominee / work	Award	Result	Ref.
2004	"All Falls Down"	Best New Artist in a Video	Nominated	
2004	"All Falls Down"	Breakthrough Video	Nominated	
2004	"All Falls Down"	Best Hip-Hop Video	Nominated	
2004	"All Falls Down"	Best Male Video	Nominated	
2005	"Jesus Walks"	Best Male Video	Won	
2005	"Jesus Walks"	Video of the Year	Nominated	
2005	"Jesus Walks"	Best Hip-Hop Video	Nominated	
2006	"Gold Digger"	Best Hip-Hop Video	Nominated	
2006	"Gold Digger"	Best Male Video	Nominated	
2006	"Gold Digger"	Ringtone of the Year	Nominated	
2007	"Stronger"	Video of the Year	Nominated	
2007	"Stronger"	Best Director	Nominated	
2007	"Stronger"	Best Editing	Nominated	
2007	Kanye West	Male Artist of the Year	Nominated	
2007	Kanye West	Quadruple Threat of the Year	Nominated	
2008	"Good Life"	Best Special Effects	Won	
2008	"Homecoming"	Best Hip-Hop Video	Nominated	
2009	"Love Lockdown"	Best Hip-Hop Video	Nominated	
2009	"Love Lockdown"	Video of the Year	Nominated	
2009	"Love Lockdown"	Best Male Video	Nominated	
2009	"Paranoid"	Best Special Effects	Nominated	
2010	"Forever" (with Drake, Lil Wayne & Eminem)	Best Hip-Hop Video	Nominated	
2011	"Power"	Best Special Effects	Nominated	
2011	"Power"	Best Art Direction	Nominated	
2011	"All of the Lights"	Best Male Video	Nominated	
2011	"All of the Lights"	Best Editing	Nominated	
2011	"All of the Lights"	Best Collaboration	Nominated	
2011	"All of the Lights"	Best Hip-Hop Video	Nominated	
2011	E.T. (with Katy Perry)	Best Collaboration	Won	
2012	"Otis" (with Jay-Z)	Best Direction	Nominated	
2012	"Mercy"	Best Hip-Hop Video	Nominated	
2012	"Mercy"	Best Editing	Nominated	
2012	"Niggas in Paris" (with Jay-Z)	Best Editing	Nominated	
2012	"Niggas in Paris" (with Jay-Z)	Best Hip-Hop Video	Nominated	
2014	"Black Skinhead"	Best Hip-Hop Video	Nominated	
2015	Kanye West	Michael Jackson Video Vanguard Award	Won	
2016	"Famous"	Video of the Year	Nominated	
2016	"Famous"	Best Male Video	Nominated	
2017	"Fade"	Best Choreography	Won	
2019	"I Love It"	Best Art Direction	Nominated	

=== MTV Video Music Awards Japan ===
The MTV Video Music Awards Japan was established in 2002 to recognize excellence in music videos from Japanese and international artists. West has received thirteen nominations.

Year	Nominee / work	Award	Result	Ref.
2005	"Jesus Walks"	Best Male Video	Nominated	
2005	"Jesus Walks"	Best Hip-Hop Video	Nominated	
2006	"Gold Digger"	Best Hip-Hop Video	Nominated	
2006	"Diamonds From Sierra Leone"	Best Male Video	Nominated	
2008	"Stronger"	Video of the Year	Nominated	
2008	"Stronger"	Best Hip-Hop Video	Nominated	
2009	"Heartless"	Best Hip-Hop Video	Nominated	
2009	"Heartless"	Best Male Video	Nominated	
2011	"Runaway"	Best Male Video	Nominated	
2011	"Power"	Best Hip-Hop Video	Nominated	
2012	"Otis" (with Jay-Z)	Best Hip-Hop Video	Nominated	
2012	"Otis" (with Jay-Z)	Best Collaboration	Nominated	
2016	"Famous"	Best Hip-Hop Video	Nominated	

=== MTV Video Music Brazil Awards ===
The MTV Video Music Brazil, commonly known as VMB, was MTV Brazil's annual award ceremony. Established in 1995, the ceremony was discontinued in 2013. West received three nominations.

Year	Nominee / work	Award	Result	Ref.
2008	Kanye West	Best International Act	Nominated	
2011	Kanye West	Best International Act	Nominated	
2012	Kanye West & Jay-Z	Best International Act	Nominated	

=== MTV Video Play Awards ===
The MTV Video Play Awards see MTV International recognize the artists who have the most played music videos across the MTV (Music Television) channels around the world. West has received two awards.

Year	Nominee / work	Award	Result	Ref.
2012	"All of the Lights"	Gold	Won	
2012	"E.T." (with Katy Perry)	Platinum	Won	

=== MTVU Woodie Awards ===
The MTVU Woodie Awards were created by MTV in 2004 to recognize the best in music as voted by college students. West has received one award from six nominations.

Year	Nominee / work	Award	Result	Ref.
2006	Kanye West - Loop Dreams	Good Woodie	Nominated	
2008	Kanye West	Performing Woodie	Nominated	
2011	Kanye West	Left Field Woodie	Won	
2012	Kanye West & Jay-Z	Performing Woodie	Nominated	
2013	"Mercy" (featuring Big Sean, Pusha T & 2 Chainz)	Tag Team Woodie	Nominated	
2014	Kanye West	Did It My Way Woodie	Nominated	

== MuchMusic Video Awards ==
The MuchMusic Video Awards are annual awards presented by the Canadian TV channel Much to honour the year's best music videos. West has received fourteen nominations.

Year	Nominee / work	Award	Result	Ref.
2004	"All Falls Down"	Best International Video - Artist	Nominated	
2005	"Jesus Walks"	Best International Video - Artist	Nominated	
2006	"Gold Digger"	Best International Video - Artist	Nominated	
2006	"Gold Digger"	People's Choice: Favorite International Artist	Nominated	
2006	"Touch the Sky"	Best International Artist	Nominated	
2008	"Stronger"	Peoples Choice: Favourite International Video	Nominated	
2008	"Stronger"	Best International Video - Artist	Nominated	
2009	"Heartless"	Best International Video - Artist	Nominated	
2011	"Runaway"	Best International Video - Artist	Nominated	
2012	"Otis" (with Jay-Z)	Most Streamed Video of the Year	Nominated	
2013	"No Church in the Wild" (with Jay-Z)	International Video of the Year - Group	Nominated	
2014	"Bound 2"	International Video of the Year - Artist	Nominated	
2015	"FourFiveSeconds" (with Rihanna & Paul McCartney)	Best international Video - Artist	Nominated	
2016	"Only One"	iHeartRadio International Artist of the Year	Nominated	

== Music Video Production Awards ==
The Music Video Production Awards (MVPAs) are annual awards held by the Music Video Production Association. Established in 1992, they honour the best music videos of the year. West has received four awards from ten nominations.

Year	Nominee / work	Award	Result	Ref.
2005	"Ordinary People" (as director)	Best R&B Video	Nominated	
2005	"Jesus Walks"	Best Cinematography	Nominated	
2005	"Jesus Walks"	Best Editing	Nominated	
2005	"Jesus Walks"	Best Hip-Hop Video	Nominated	
2006	"Heard 'Em Say"	Best Hip-Hop Video	Won	
2007	"Touch the Sky"	Best Hip-Hop Video	Won	
2007	"Touch the Sky"	Best Cinematography	Nominated	
2007	"Touch the Sky"	Best Styling	Nominated	
2009	We Were Once A Fairytale	Best Hip-Hop Video	Won	
2012	"Otis" (with Jay-Z)	Best Hip-Hop Video	Won	

== NAACP Image Awards ==
The NAACP Image Awards, established in 1967, are presented annually by the American National Association for the Advancement of Colored People to honor outstanding achievements and performances of people of color in film, television, music, and literature. West has received one award from twenty nominations.

Year	Nominee / work	Award	Result	Ref.
2005	Kanye West	Outstanding New Artist	Won	
2005	"Jesus Walks"	Outstanding Music Video	Nominated	
2005	"Jesus Walks"	Outstanding Song	Nominated	
2005	The College Dropout	Outstanding Album	Nominated	
2006	Late Registration	Outstanding Album	Nominated	
2006	"Diamonds from Sierra Leone"	Outstanding Music Video	Nominated	
2006	"Diamonds from Sierra Leone"	Outstanding Song	Nominated	
2006	Kanye West	Outstanding Male Artist	Nominated	
2008	Kanye West	Outstanding Male Artist	Nominated	
2008	"Stronger"	Outstanding Music Video	Nominated	
2008	"Stronger"	Outstanding Song	Nominated	
2008	Graduation	Outstanding Album	Nominated	
2009	808s & Heartbreak	Outstanding Album	Nominated	
2009	"American Boy" (with Estelle)	Outstanding Duo, Group or Collaboration	Nominated	
2010	"Run This Town" (with Jay-Z & Rihanna)	Outstanding Duo, Group or Collaboration	Nominated	
2011	Kanye West	Outstanding Male Artist	Nominated	
2011	My Beautiful Dark Twisted Fantasy	Outstanding Album	Nominated	
2016	"One Man Can Change The World" (with Big Sean & John Legend)	Outstanding Duo, Group or Collaboration	Nominated	
2018	"Love Yourself" (with Mary J. Blige)	Outstanding Duo, Group or Collaboration	Nominated	
2023	City of Gods (with Fivio Foreign & Alicia Keys)	Outstanding Hip Hop/Rap Song	Nominated	

== NME Awards ==
The NME Awards are an annual music awards show founded by the music magazine NME. West has received two awards from eighteen nominations.

Year	Nominee / work	Award	Result	Ref.
2006	Kanye West	Best Solo Artist	Won	
2010	Kanye West	Villain of the Year	Won	
2011	Kanye West	Best Solo Artist	Nominated	
2011	Kanye West	Best Band Blog or Twitter	Nominated	
2011	Kanye West	Hero of the Year	Nominated	
2012	Watch The Throne	Best Album Artwork	Nominated	
2012	Kanye West	Best Band Blog or Twitter	Nominated	
2013	"Niggas In Paris" (with Jay-Z)	Best Dancefloor Anthem	Nominated	
2014	Yeezus	Best Album	Nominated	
2014	Kanye West brings Jesus on stage	Music Moment Of The Year	Nominated	
2014	Kanye West	Best Solo Artist	Nominated	
2016	Kanye West	Hero of the Year	Nominated	
2016	Kanye West	Best International Solo Artist	Nominated	
2016	Kanye West	Villain of the Year	Nominated	
2016	Kanye at the Brits	Music Moment of the Year	Nominated	
2017
2017	Kanye West	Best International Male Artist	Nominated	
2017	"Famous"	Best Video	Nominated	
2017	The Life of Pablo	Best Album	Nominated	

== NRJ Music Awards ==
The NRJ Music Awards are an annual award held by the radio station NRJ since 2000. West has received three nominations.

Year	Nominee / work	Award	Result	Ref.
2009	"American Boy" (with Estelle)	Best International Song	Nominated	
2009	Kanye West & Estelle	International Group / Duo of the Year	Nominated	
2015	Kanye West, Paul McCartney & Rihanna	International Group / Duo of the Year	Nominated	

== O Music Awards ==
The O Music Awards is one of the major annual awards established by MTV to honor the art, creativity, personality and technology of music into the digital space. West has received one award from seven nominations, including five separate tweets nominated for Best Tweet in 2011.

Year	Nominee / work	Award	Result	Ref.
2011	Kanye West	Innovative Artist	Nominated	
2011	Kanye West	Must Follow Artist on Twitter	Nominated	
2011	Favorite F**k Yeah Tumblr	F**k Yeah Kanye West	Nominated	
2011	Best Tweet	Kanye West	Nominated	
2011	Best Tweet	Kanye West	Nominated	
2011	Best Tweet	Kanye West	Nominated	
2011	Best Tweet	Kanye West	Nominated	
2011	Best Tweet	Kanye West	Won	

== People's Choice Awards ==
The People's Choice Awards is an awards show honoring people and their work in popular culture based on online votes. West has received two awards from six nominations.

Year	Nominee / work	Award	Result	Ref.
2008	"Stronger"	Favorite Hip-Hop Song	Nominated	
2009	"Good Life" (featuring T-Pain)	Favorite Hip-Hop Song	Nominated	
2010	"Run This Town" (with Jay-Z & Rihanna)	Favorite Music Collaboration	Won	
2012	"E.T." (with Katy Perry)	Favorite Song of the Year	Won	
2014	Kanye West	Favorite Hip-Hop Artist	Nominated	
2017	Kanye West	Favorite Hip-Hop Artist	Nominated	

== Pollstar Awards ==
The Pollstar Awards are an annual award ceremony to honor artists and professionals in the concert industry. West has received three nominations.

Year	Nominee / work	Award	Result	Ref.
2004	Kanye West	Best New Touring Artist	Nominated	
2008	Kanye West	Most Creative Stage Production	Nominated	
2016	Kanye West	Most Creative Stage Production	Nominated	

== Q Awards ==
The Q Awards are annual music awards run by the music magazine Q. West has received one nomination.

Year	Nominee / work	Award	Result	Ref.
2015	Kanye West	Best Solo Artist	Nominated	

== Shorty Awards ==
The Shorty Awards is an annual awards show recognizing the people and organizations that produce real-time short form content across Twitter, Facebook, Tumblr, YouTube, Instagram and the rest of the social web. West has received one nomination.

Year	Nominee / work	Award	Result	Ref.
2016	Kanye West	Best Musician	Nominated	

== Smash Hits Awards ==
The Smash Hits Awards was an awards ceremony voted by readers of the Smash Hits magazine. The show ran from 1988 to 2005. West received one nomination.

Year	Nominee / work	Award	Result	Ref.
2005	Kanye West	Best Hip Hop Act	Nominated	

== Soul Train Music Awards ==
The Soul Train Music Awards honour the best in black music and entertainment. West has received four awards from nineteen nominations.

Year	Nominee / work	Award	Result	Ref.
2004	Kanye West	Best New Artist	Nominated	
2005	"Jesus Walks"	Video of the Year	Nominated	
2006	"Gold Digger" (featuring Jamie Foxx)	Video of the Year	Won	
2006	"Gold Digger" (featuring Jamie Foxx)	Best R&B/Soul or Rap Dance Cut	Nominated	
2009	808's & Heartbreak	Album of the Year	Nominated	
2009	"Knock You Down" (with Keri Hilson & Ne-Yo)	Best Collaboration	Won	
2009	"Knock You Down" (with Keri Hilson & Ne-Yo)	Record of the Year	Nominated	
2010	"Find Your Love" (as songwriter)	Record of the Year	Nominated	
2011	Watch the Throne	Album of the Year	Nominated	
2011	"All of the Lights" (featuring Rihanna)	Song of the Year	Nominated	
2011	"All of the Lights" (featuring Rihanna)	Hip-Hop Song of the Year	Nominated	
2011	"Otis" (with Jay-Z)	Hip-Hop Song of the Year	Nominated	
2012	"Mercy" (featuring Big Sean, Pusha T & 2 Chains)	Hip-Hop Song of the Year	Won	
2015	"Blessings" (with Big Sean & Drake)	Hip-Hop Song of the Year	Nominated	
2015	"Blessings" (with Big Sean & Drake)	Best Collaboration	Nominated	
2016	The Life of Pablo	Album of the Year	Nominated	
2016	"Fade"	Video of the Year	Nominated	
2016	"Fade"	Best Dance Performance	Won	
2017	Love Yourself (with Mary J. Blige)	Best Collaboration	Nominated	

== Source Awards ==
The Source Awards was an annual awards show hosted by The Source magazine from 1994 to 2004, honouring Hip-Hop & R&B performers. West received three awards from ten nominations.

Year	Nominee / work	Award	Result	Ref.
2003	"B R Right" (as producer)	Single of the Year - Female Solo Artist	Nominated	
2003	"Guess Who's Back" (as producer)	Fat Tape Song of the Year	Won	
2003	Kanye West	Producer of the Year	Nominated	
2004	Kanye West	Producer of the Year	Nominated	
2004	Kanye West	Breakthrough Artist	Won	
2004	Kanye West	Lyricist of the Year	Nominated	
2004	Kanye West	Live Performer of the Year	Nominated	
2004	"Slow Jamz" (with Twista & Jamie Foxx)	R&B/Rap Collaboration of the Year	Nominated	
2004	The College Dropout	Album of the Year	Won	
2004	"Through the Wire"	Video of the Year	Won	

== South African Hip Hop Awards ==
The annual South African Hip Hop Awards were established in 2012.

Year	Nominee / work	Award	Result	Ref.
2021	Himself	Best International Act	Nominated	

== Sucker Free Awards ==
The Sucker Free Awards were a 2011 awards ceremony that honoured the best of the year in hip-hop, throughout seven different categories. West received two awards from three nominations.

Year	Nominee / work	Award	Result	Ref.
2011	Kanye West & Jay-Z	The Artist That Ran 2011	Nominated	
2011	Watch The Throne	Best Album of the Year	Won	
2011	"Niggas In Paris" (with Jay-Z)	Song of the Year	Won	

== Swiss Music Awards ==
The Swiss Music Awards were created to promote national music scene and at the same time present its cultural diversity. West has received three nominations.

Year	Nominee / work	Award	Result	Ref.
2008	Graduation	Best Album Urban International	Nominated	
2009	808s & Heartbreak	Best Album Urban International	Nominated	
2012	Watch The Throne	Best Album Urban International	Nominated	

== TEC Awards ==
The TEC Awards honour the most outstanding products in the worlds of music making, live performances, video games, television and films. West has received two nominations.

Year	Nominee / work	Award	Result	Ref.
2006	"Gold Digger" (featuring Jamie Foxx)	Record Production/Single or Track	Nominated	
2006	Late Registration	Record Production/Album	Nominated	

== Teen Choice Awards ==
The Teen Choice Awards is an annual awards show that airs on the Fox Network. The awards honour the year's biggest achievements in music, films, sports, television, fashion and other categories, voted by teenage viewers. West has received one award from twenty-six nominations.

Year	Nominee / work	Award	Result	Ref.
2004	The College Dropout	Choice Music: Album	Nominated	
2004	"All Falls Down" (featuring Sylenna Johnson)	Choice Music: Hip-Hop/Rap Track	Nominated	
2004	Kanye West	Choice Music: Male Artist	Nominated	
2004	Kanye West	Choice Music: R&B Artist	Nominated	
2004	Kanye West	Choice Music: Breakout Artist	Nominated	
2005	Kanye West	Choice Music: Rap Artist	Nominated	
2006	Kanye West	Choice Music: Rap Artist	Nominated	
2006	Kanye West	Choice Music: Male Artist	Nominated	
2008	Kanye West	Choice Music: Male Artist	Nominated	
2008	Kanye West	Choice Music: Rap Artist	Nominated	
2008	"Homecoming" (featuring Chris Martin)	Choice Music: R&B/Hip-Hop Track	Nominated	
2009	Kanye West	Choice Music: Rap Artist	Won	
2009	Kanye West	Choice Music: Male Artist	Nominated	
2009	"Love Lockdown"	Choice Music: R&B Track	Nominated	
2009	"Heartless"	Choice Music: Rap/Hip-Hop Track	Nominated	
2009	808s & Heartbreak	Choice Music: Album – Male	Nominated	
2009	"Knock You Down" (with Keri Hilson & Ne-Yo)	Choice Music: Summer Song	Nominated	
2011	"All of the Lights" (featuring Rihanna)	Choice Music: R&B/Hip-Hop Track	Nominated	
2011	Kanye West	Choice Music: R&B/Hip-Hop Artist	Nominated	
2012	Kanye West	Choice Music: R&B/Hip-Hop Artist	Nominated	
2013	Kanye West	Choice Music: Hip-Hop/Rap Artist	Nominated	
2015	Kanye West	Choice Music: Hip-Hop/Rap Artist	Nominated	
2015	"FourFiveSeconds" (with Rihanna & Paul McCartney)	Choice Music: R&B/Hip-Hop Song	Nominated	
2016	Kanye West	Choice Twit	Nominated	
2016	Kanye West	Choice Style: Male	Nominated	
2016	Kanye West	Social Media King	Nominated	

== The Recording Academy Honors ==
The Recording Academy Honors Awards were established to celebrate outstanding individuals whose work embodies excellence and integrity and who have improved the environment for the creative community. West has received one award.

Year	Nominee / work	Award	Result	Ref.
2007	Kanye West	Chicago Chapter's The Recording Academy Honors	Won	

== The Record of the Year ==
The Record of the Year was an award special televised by the ITV network. The winner was voted for by the British public from a selection of the year's ten biggest-selling singles in the United Kingdom. West received one nomination.

Year	Nominee / work	Award	Result	Ref.
2009	"American Boy" (with Estelle)	The Record of the Year	Nominated	

== TMF Awards ==
The TMF Awards was an annual Belgium television awards show broadcast live on The Music Factory from 1995 to 2009. West received one nomination.

Year	Nominee / work	Award	Result	Ref.
2009	Kanye West	Best Urban International	Nominated	

== TMH Awards ==
The TMH Awards were presented annually by Tmhxone.com, an urban music website. West received one award from five nominations.

Year	Nominee / work	Award	Result	Ref.
2004	Kanye West	Best New Hip Hop Artist	Won	
2004	Kanye West	Artist of the Year	Nominated	
2004	"Slow Jamz" (with Twista & Jamie Foxx)	Hottest Collab Single of the Year	Nominated	
2004	"Slow Jamz" (with Twista & Jamie Foxx)	Favorite Ballad of the Year	Nominated	
2004	"Jesus Walks"	Video of the Year	Nominated	

== TRL Awards ==
The TRL Awards, were presented by Total Request Live. A subsidiary of MTV.

Year	Nominee / work	Award	Result	Ref.
2005	Kanye West	Best New Artist Award	Won	
2005	Kanye West	Best Male Artist Award	Nominated	
2006	Kanye West	Best Male Artist Award	Nominated	

== UK Festival Awards ==
The UK Festival Awards acknowledge the achievements of organizers and suppliers in the fields of programming, production, innovation, emerging talent, marketing, hospitality, catering and more in the UK festival industry. West has received one nomination.

Year	Nominee / work	Award	Result	Ref.
2013	"Niggas In Paris" (with Jay-Z)	Anthem of the Summer	Nominated	

== UK Music Video Awards ==
The UK Music Video Awards is an annual award ceremony founded in 2008 to recognize creativity, technical excellence and innovation in music videos. West has received two awards from nine nominations.

Year	Nominee / work	Award	Result	Ref.
2010	"Power"	Best Visual Effects	Nominated	
2010	"Power"	Best Urban Video – International	Nominated	
2011	"Otis" (with Jay-Z)	Best Urban Video – International	Won	
2012	"Niggas In Paris" (with Jay-Z)	Best Urban Video – International	Nominated	
2012	"No Church In The Wild" (with Jay-Z)	Best Urban Video – International	Nominated	
2012	"No Church In The Wild" (with Jay-Z)	Best Cinematography In A Video	Nominated	
2012	"No Church In The Wild" (with Jay-Z)	Best Telecine In A Video	Nominated	
2017	"Fade"	Best Dance International	Nominated	
2017	"Fade"	Best Choreography in a Video	Won	

== Urban Music Awards ==
=== Urban Music Awards Australia and New Zealand ===
The Urban Music Awards Australia and New Zealand were established in 2006 as a means of celebrating hip hop, soul and R&B acts throughout the two countries. Two awards ceremonies were held, in 2006 and 2007.

Year	Nominee / work	Award	Result	Ref.
2006	Kanye West	Best International Act	Won	

=== Urban Music Awards UK ===
The Urban Music Awards UK was launched in 2003, and celebrates urban music in the UK. West has received one award from three nominations.

Year	Nominee / work	Award	Result	Ref.
2008	"American Boy" (with Estelle)	Best Collaboration	Won	
2013	Kanye West	Best International Artist	Nominated	
2016	Kanye West	Best International Artist	Nominated	
2018	Kanye West	Best International Artist	Nominated	
2018	Kanye West	Artist of the Year (USA)	Nominated	

=== Urban Music Awards USA ===
The Urban Music Awards USA was launched in 2007, and celebrated urban music in the USA. The show was discontinued after its second ceremony in 2009. West received two awards from three nominations.

Year	Nominee / work	Award	Result	Ref.
2009	808s & Heartbreak	Best Album	Won	
2009	Kanye West	Best Hip-Hop Act	Nominated	
2009	"American Boy" (with Estelle)	Best Collaboration	Won	

== Vibe Awards ==
The Vibe Awards was a Hip-Hop/R&B music awards ceremony held from 2003 up till 2007. West received two awards from ten nominations.

Year	Nominee / work	Award	Result	Ref.
2004	Kanye West	Artist of the Year	Nominated	
2004	"Jesus Walks"	Hottest Hook	Nominated	
2004	"All Falls Down" (featuring Sylenna Johnson)	Reelest Video	Nominated	
2004	"Slow Jamz" (with Twista & Jamie Foxx)	Coolest Collabo	Nominated	
2005	"Gold Digger" (featuring Jamie Foxx)	Coolest Collabo	Nominated	
2005	Late Registration	Album of the Year	Nominated	
2005	Kanye West	Artist of the Year	Nominated	
2005	Kanye West	Best Rapper	Won	
2007	Kanye West	VStyle	Nominated	
2007	Can't Tell Me Nothing	Mixtape of the Year	Won	

== Virgin Media Music Awards ==
The Virgin Media Music Awards were an online music awards show. West received one award from four nominations.

Year	Nominee / work	Award	Result	Ref.
2010	Kanye West	Loser of the Year	Won	
2011	Kanye West	Best Male	Nominated	
2011	Kanye West & Jay-Z	Best Collaboration	Nominated	
2011	Kanye West & Katy Perry	Best Collaboration	Nominated	

== Webby Awards ==
The Webby Awards are given for excellence on the Internet, and presented annually by The International Academy of Digital Arts and Sciences. West has received one award.

Year	Nominee / work	Award	Result	Ref.
2016	Kanye West	Artist of the Year	Won	

== World Music Awards ==
The World Music Awards is an international awards show founded in 1989 that annually honors recording artists based on worldwide sales figures provided by the International Federation of the Phonographic Industry (IFPI). West has received two awards from eleven nominations.

Year	Nominee / work	Award	Result	Ref.
2004	Kanye West	World's Best New Male Artist	Won	
2006	Kanye West	World's Best Selling Hip-Hop/Rap Artist	Won	
2014	Kanye West	World's Best Entertainer of the Year	Nominated	
2014	Kanye West	World's Best Male Artist	Nominated	
2014	Kanye West	World's Best Live Act	Nominated	
2014	Yeezus	World's Best Album	Nominated	
2014	Cruel Summer	World's Best Album	Nominated	
2014	"Black Skinhead"	World's Best Song	Nominated	
2014	"Clique" (featuring Big Sean & Jay-Z)	World's Best Song	Nominated	
2014	"Mercy" (featuring Big Sean, Pusha T & 2 Chainz)	World's Best Song	Nominated	
2014	"Mercy" (featuring Big Sean, Pusha T & 2 Chainz)	World's Best Music Video	Nominated	

== XM Nation Awards ==
The XM Nation Music Awards were a 2005 awards show on XM Satellite Radio, voted on by nearly 1.4 million music fans nationwide for nominated artists and categories selected by XM's programming staff. West received one award from two nominations.

Year	Nominee / work	Award	Result	Ref.
2005	Kanye West	Most Important Established Artist	Nominated	
2005	Kanye West	Urban Artist of the Year	Won	

== XXL Awards ==
The XXL Awards recognised the best in Hip-Hop in 2012. The nominees and winners were picked by the XXL staff, excluding the winners in the big five biggest categories which was determined by public vote. West received 5 awards from fifteen nominations.

Year	Nominee / work	Award	Result	Ref.
2013	"Mercy" (featuring Big Sean, Pusha T & 2 Chainz)	Record of the Year	Won	
2013	"Mercy" (featuring Big Sean, Pusha T & 2 Chainz)	Best Video	Nominated	
2013	"Mercy" (featuring Big Sean, Pusha T & 2 Chainz)	Best Posse Cut	Won	
2013	"I Don't Like Remix" (with Chief Keef, Pusha T, Big Sean & Jadakiss)	Best Posse Cut	Nominated	
2013	"I Don't Like Remix" (with Chief Keef, Pusha T, Big Sean & Jadakiss)	Best Remix	Won	
2013	Kanye West	Best Dressed	Nominated	
2013	Cruel Summer	Best Group Album	Won	
2013	"New God Flow" (co-produced with Boogz N Tapez & Anthony Kilhoffer)	Best Beat	Won	
2022	Kanye West	People's Champ	Nominated	
2022	Kanye West	Performer of the Year	Nominated	
2022	Kanye West	Male Rapper of the Year	Nominated	
2022	Kanye West	Artist of the Year	Nominated	
2022	Kanye West	Producer of the Year	Nominated	
2022	Donda	Album of the Year	Nominated	
2022	Off the Grid	Song of the Year	Nominated	

== Other accolades ==
=== State Honors ===
Name of country, year given, and name of honor
Country	Year	Honor	Ref.
United States	2021	July 22, Kanye West Day in Atlanta	
United States	2026	October 31, Global Icon Award Texas	

=== World Records ===
Name of publication, year the record was awarded, name of the record, and the name of the record holder
Publication	Year	World record	Record holder	Ref.
	2015	First artist-owned music streaming service	Tidal	
Guinness World Records	2020	Highest Annual Earnings for a Celebrity (male, current)	Kanye West	
Guinness World Records	2020	Highest Annual Earnings for a Rap Artist	Kanye West	
Guinness World Records	2020	Highest-earning Living Celebrity (male, current)	Kanye West	
Guinness World Records	2021	Richest musician (male)	Kanye West	
	2021	Nike Air Yeezy Sample (The most expensive trainers (sneakers) sold in a private sale are a pair of Nike Air Yeezy Sample)	Nike Air Yeezy Sample	
