= Jade MacRae =

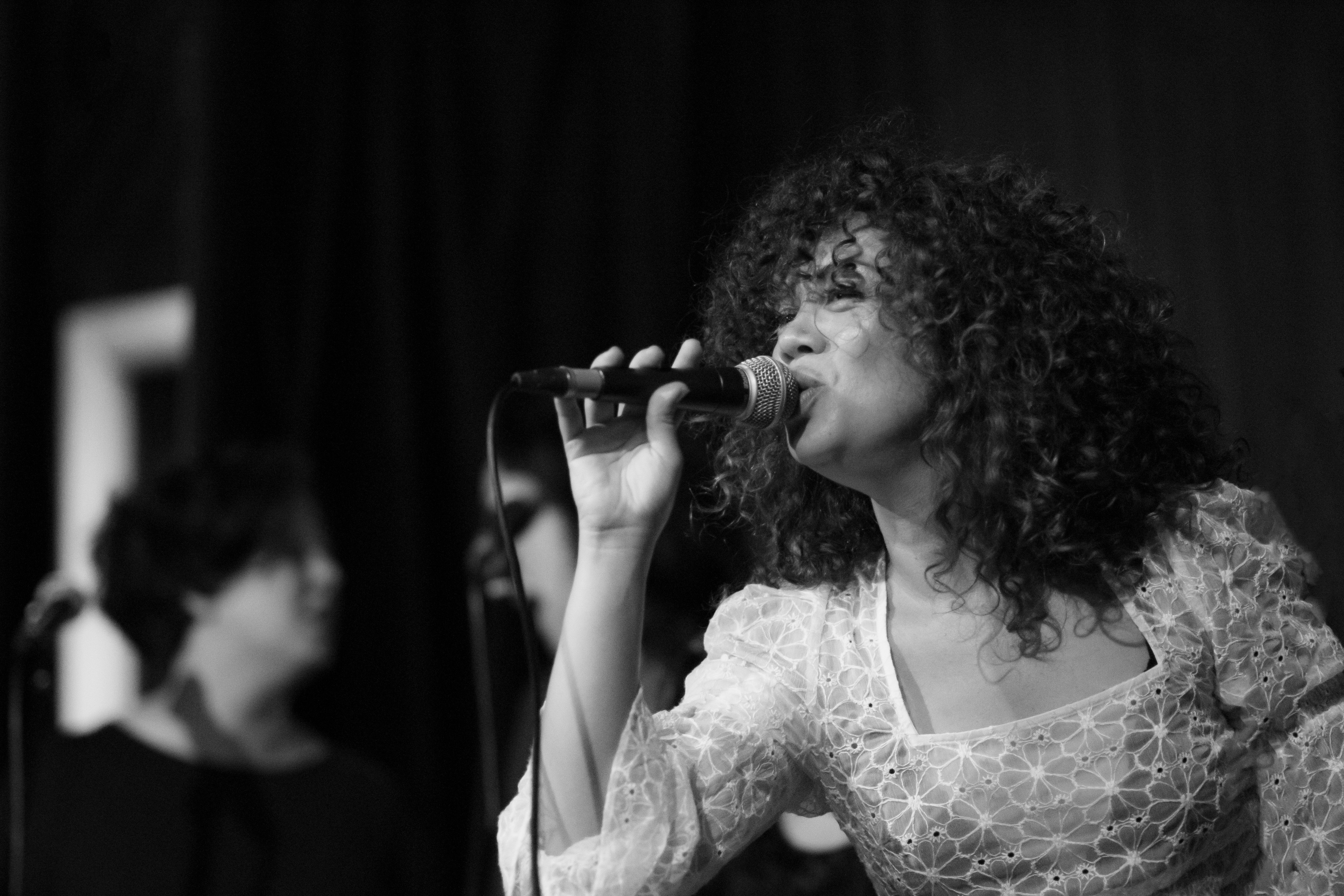
- MacRae in 2019

Background information
- Born: Jade Aurora MacRae; 4 June 1979 (age 47); London, England
- Origin: Sydney, Australia
- Genre: Soul
- Occupation: Singer
- Instrument: Vocals
- Years active: 2002–present
- Label: Sony BMG/Workstation

Jade Aurora MacRae (born 4 June 1979) is an Australian soul singer and the daughter of professional musicians Joy Yates and Dave MacRae. MacRae is best known for her top 40 singles "So Hot Right Now" and "Superstar", both released in 2005. In 2012, following her marriage to Australian hip hop artist Phrase, MacRae continued her musical career under the new moniker of Dune.

== Early life and education ==
Jade Aurora Moana MacRae was born in London, England, into a musical family. MacRae's New Zealand parents are session vocalist Joy Yates, who is of Māori and European descent, and pianist Dave MacRae. After moving to Australia before the age of eight, MacRae grew up in Sydney. She began learning the piano at the age of three years and the violin at the age of eight.

MacRae studied during her high school years at the Sydney Conservatorium of Music and engaged in musical projects with members of The Sleepy Jackson and Pnau.

She completed the New South Wales Higher School Certificate.

== Career ==
MacRae began singing in a number of entertainment venues as well as singing in a band with Mahalia Barnes and supporting Renée Geyer and Jackie Orszaczky. Through her association with Mahalia Barnes, MacRae attained further work as a backup singer with Jimmy Barnes and worked as a session musician with Australian electronic acts such as Disco Montego, Endorphin, and Pnau.

=== 2004–2006: Jade MacRae ===
Early in 2004, German dance producer Ian Pooley recruited MacRae to sing on the track "Heaven", together with Danni'elle Gaha. The song featured on the German dance charts.

MacRae signed a record contract with Michael Hegarty of Workstation Records and worked with a number of producers throughout 2004. In October 2004, MacRae released her debut solo single "You Make Me Weak" which peaked at number 46 on the ARIA Charts.

In February 2005, MacRae released "So Hot Right Now" which debuted and peaked at number 18 on the ARIA Charts. In September 2005, MacRae released her debut self-titled album which peaked at number 61 on the ARIA Charts. The album's third single "Superstar" peaked at number 32 on the ARIA Charts. The accompanying music video was directed by Ryan Renshaw.

MacRae performed the Australian national anthem "Advance Australia Fair" at the FIFA World Cup qualifying match, between Australia and Uruguay national football team, at Sydney's Stadium Australia venue.

At the ARIA Music Awards of 2006, MacRae was nominated for two ARIA Award nominations; ARIA Award for Best Urban Album and ARIA Award for Best Female Artist.

=== 2007–2011: Get Me Home ===
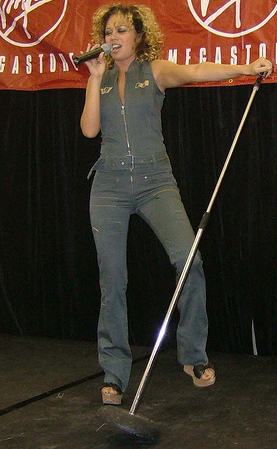
MacRae in 2009

In 2007, MacRae performed an hour-long set prior to the Asian Football Confederation (AFC)'s third and fourth Asian Cup quarter final matches in Sydney, Australia. The 2007 Asian Cup was the first time that Australia participated in the competition.

In mid-2007, MacRae toured Australia as part of the Broad show, performing alongside Deborah Conway, New Buffalo, Anne McCue, and Abbe May.

In September 2007, MacRae released "In the Basement", the lead single from her second studio album. The song peaked at number 60 on the ARIA Chart. After several delays, MacRae's second album Get Me Home was released in October 2008, together with the album's second single "I Wanna Be in Love". The album failed to enter any music charts. In a 2012 interview MacRae confessed that the lack of the success of the album impacted her confidence. MacRae said she was "shell-shocked after that didn't work out. It was a hard thing to recover from."

=== 2012–2017: Dune ===
In 2012, MacRae contributed vocals to the soundtrack of the Australian film The Sapphires (alongside Jessica Mauboy and Lou Bennett, Juanita Tippens and Darren Percival), in addition to the fourth album of Australian artist Kevin Mitchell (recording under his "Bob Evans" pseudonym), Familiar Stranger.

In September 2012 MacRae assumed a new musical pseudonym "Dune", saying "The music I'm making is definitely more alternative, so I thought it needed its name, its identity and personality". In July 2012, Dune released the song "Shoestring" together with a music video.

Dune released the EP Oh Innocence on 14 March 2013, and MacRae revealed the Dune recordings were self-funded, self-produced, and self-released. MacRae's live band for the Dune project consists of a bassist and drummer, Luke Hodgson and Leigh Fisher (both from the band Gypsy and the Cat), and the group was invited to play at the 2013 Great Escape Festival held annually in Brighton, UK.

In 2013 in an interview with the Time Out media group, MacRae provided an insight into the response from fans of her previous work under the "Jade MacRae" title "I think some people are quite disappointed in the new direction – some people on the urban scene can be quite staunch ... It's amazing how short people's memories are although. A lot of the people I deal with in media have no recollection of me ... There's no culture these days in the mainstream really – the idea of discovering an artist, getting all their albums, and getting obsessed with them is dying out. It still exists to some extent in indie bands and left-of-center music."

=== 2018–present: Handle Me with Care ===
In 2018 MacRae announced she had returned to the studio and was working on a new album. The album was released on 12 June 2020 under the title Handle Me with Care. It was preceded by the singles "Up Above Your Head", "I Choose Love" and "Midnight Air".

In August 2024, McRae released the album In My Veins.

=== Other work ===
Jade is also a longtime backing vocalist in the Joe Bonamassa band, which tours the world extensively.

== Media appearances ==
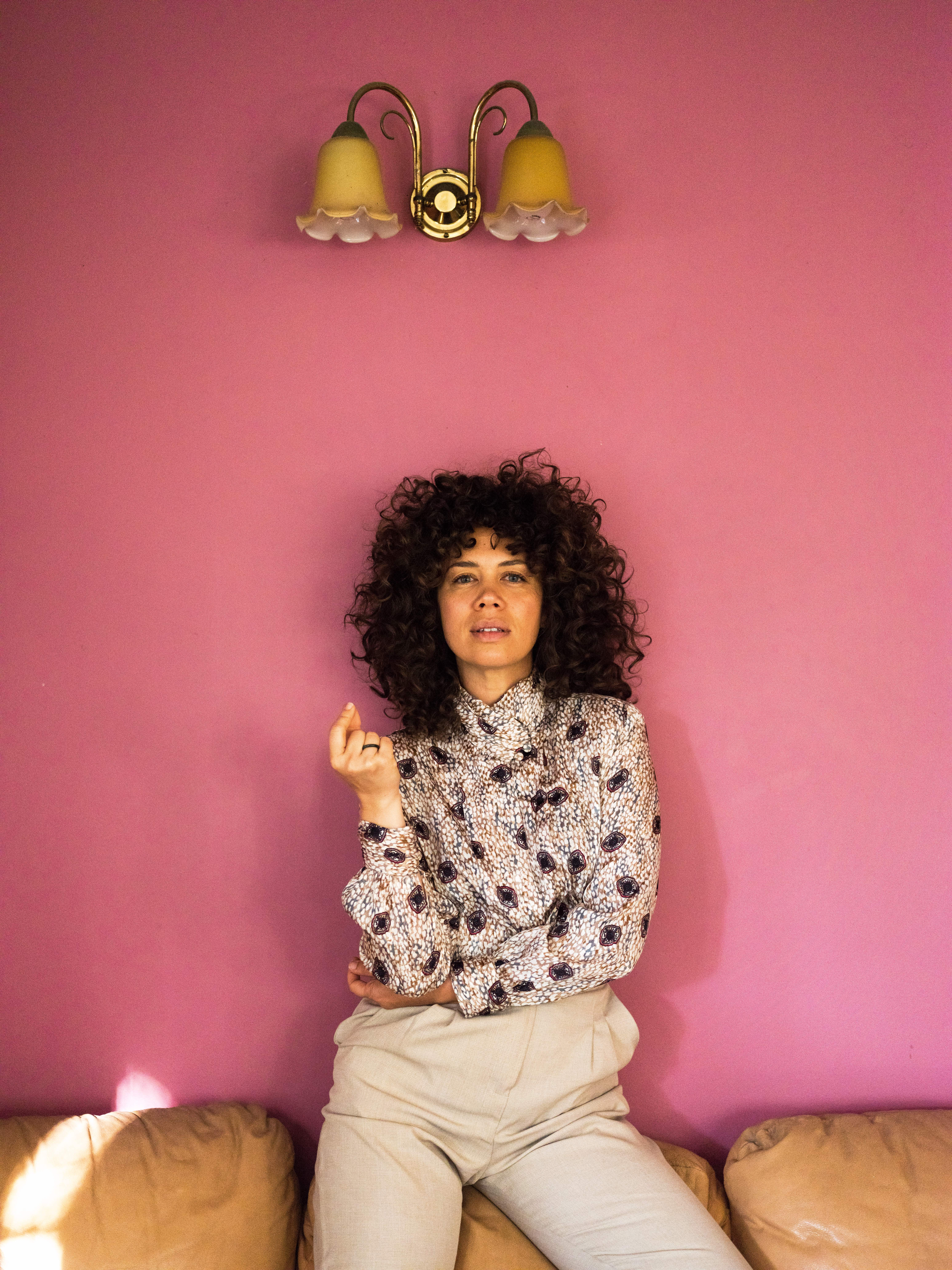
Jade MacRae in 2019

MacRae signed on to participate in the Australian celebrity television singing show, It Takes Two in 2006, and was partnered with Australian cricket player Michael Bevan—the pair was eliminated on 2 July 2006. MacRae returned to It Takes Two in May 2007, and was partnered with Home and Away's Bobby Morley (Morley appeared in the music video for MacRae's song "In The Basement" later that year). Morley and MacRae were eliminated on 12 June 2007. In 2008, MacRae returned to the television show for a third time, and was partnered with actor Paul O'Brien—the pair were eliminated in the eighth week of the season.

MacRae briefly acted in the co-host role for Sydney's Edge 96.1 radio station, and appeared several times on the Australian musical comedy/quiz shows Spicks And Specks and RocKwiz.

== Personal life ==
In August 2011, MacRae married hip hop artist Phrase, based in Melbourne, after dating since 2008.

== Discography ==
=== Albums ===
List of studio albums, with selected chart positions
Title	Details	Peak chart positions
Title	Details	AUS
Jade MacRae	Released: September 2005; Label: Workstation (501009–2)	61
Get Me Home	Released: October 2008; Label: Workstation (301343–2)	—
Handle Me with Care	Released: 12 June 2020; Label: Jade MacRae	—
In My Veins'	Released: 30 August 2024; Label: Jade MacRae	—

=== Extended plays ===
List of extended plays
Title	Details
Oh Innocence	Released: 14 March 2013

=== Singles ===
List of singles, with selected chart positions
Title	Year	Peak chart positions	Album
Title	Year	AUS	Album
"Heaven" (Ian Pooley featuring Jade and Danielle)	2004	—	Non-album single
"You Make Me Weak"	2004	46	Jade Macrae
"So Hot Right Now"	2005	18	Jade Macrae
"Superstar"	2005	32	Jade Macrae
"In the Basement"	2007	60	Get Me Home
"I Wanna Be in Love"	2008	—	Get Me Home
"Life" (Space Invadas featuring Jade MacRae)	2009	—	Non-album single
"Shoestring" (credited to Dune)	2012	—	Oh Innocence
"Oh Innocence" (credited to Dune)	2013	—	Oh Innocence
"Up Above Your Head"	2019	—	Handle Me with Care
"My Father's House"	2019	—	Non-album single
"I Choose Love"	2020	—	Handle Me with Care
"Midnight Air"	2020	—	Handle Me with Care

== Awards and nominations ==
Award	Category	About	Result
2005
ARIA Awards	Best Urban Release	"So Hot Right Now"	Nominated
POPrepublic.tv IT List Awards	Australian Female	Herself	Nominated
2006
APRA Music Awards	Most Performed Urban Work	"You Make Me Weak"	Nominated
ARIA Awards	Best Urban Release	Jade MacRae	Nominated
ARIA Awards	Best Female Artist	Herself	Nominated
MTV Australia Video Music Awards	Best R&B Video	"So Hot Right Now"	Nominated
POPrepublic.tv IT List Awards	Australian Female	Herself	Won
Urban Music Awards	Best R&B Album	Jade MacRae	Won
Urban Music Awards	Best Female Artist	Herself	Won
2007
APRA Music Awards	Most Performed Urban Work	"Superstar"	Nominated
Urban Music Awards	Best Female Artist	Herself	Won
2008
APRA Music Awards	Urban Work of the Year	"In the Basement"	Won
