= You Make Me Weak =

- Cd Cover

Single by Jade MacRae

from the album Jade MacRae
- A-side: "You Make Me Weak"
- B-side: "Real Thing"
- Released: 18 October 2004
- Recorded: 2004
- Genre: R&B
- Length: 3:34
- Label: Sony BMG
- Songwriters: Jade MacRae, Israel Cruz

Jade MacRae singles chronology
"Heaven" (2004)	"You Make Me Weak" (2004)	"So Hot Right Now" (2005)

"You Make Me Weak" is a song by Australian musician Jade MacRae, AKA Dune, and was released in October 2004 as her debut and lead single from her debut studio album (2005). The song peaked at number 46 on the ARIA Charts. It was co-produced by Australian singer-songwriter and producer Israel Cruz

== Music video ==
The film clip starts off with Jade pinning up a poster in the record store she is working at. When a guy walks into the store that she tries to get his attention but fails. The next scene is her riding her electric scooter, followed by clips of her in her bedroom wearing lingerie. The next scene is her attending a dance class, where the man from the record store also dances. The location switches from the dance lesson to her bedroom. Later, she leans against a tree in the forest while the same man is on the other side of the tree. The man is oblivious to her presence in all locations.

Jade is all dressed up and sitting in a fancy living room when the man appears and goes about his business; cooking and taking a shower, all the while not noticing she is there. In the final seconds of the video he looks directly at her, but it is revealed she is a reflection in a glass window as she walks away.

== Track listing ==
CD Single

1. "You Make Me Weak" (Radio mix)
2. "You Make Me Weak" (Elite fleet remix)
3. "You Make Me Weak" (The S.r.c.b expose remix)
4. "You Make Me Weak" (Album version)
5. "The Real Thing" (Album version)

== Charts ==
Chart (2004)	Peak position
Australia (ARIA)	46
Australian Urban (ARIA)	10
