= SuperStar (video game series) =

Rhythm game series

- Genre: Music rhythm game
- Developers: Dalcomsoft; Dalcomsoft Japan; Dalcomsoft US
- Publishers: Dalcomsoft; Dalcomsoft Japan; Dalcomsoft US
- Platforms: iOS; Android
- First release: SuperStar SM Town; August 15, 2014
- Latest release: SuperStar LDH; April 22, 2026
- Website: superstarseries.io

SuperStar (stylized in all caps) is a rhythm game series developed and published by South Korean game company Dalcomsoft. It began as a stand-alone game with SuperStar SM Town in August 2014, which later expanded into a series with SuperStar JYP Nation in July 2016.

== Gameplay ==
The SuperStar series consists of rhythm games featuring music by K-pop and pop music artists. Players play the songs by tapping notes as they descend in time with the music. The games also feature "star cards", which can be collected and upgraded to improve gameplay abilities.

Games in the SuperStar series utilize the intellectual property of their featured artists and host in-game events, including the distribution of in-game currency to new players, artist profile pictures, and "exclusive" artist imagery.

== History ==
=== 2014–2017: SuperStar SM Town and SuperStar JYP Nation ===
On August 22, 2014, SM Entertainment announced the "showcase" release of SuperStar SM Town through the Google Play Store, with plans for an iOS release the following month, followed by a global release of the game. By January 2015, Aju News reported that SuperStar SM Town had surpassed one million downloads in South Korea. Dalcomsoft announced SuperStar JYP Nation on July 5, 2016, featuring artists from entertainment agency JYP Entertainment, with the game released through the Google Play Store and the Apple App Store.

On July 2017, Pulse reported that SuperStar SM Town had raised 10 billion won ($8.8 million) in cumulative revenue and more than eight million downloads. It was also revealed that YG Entertainment was developing a similar game.

=== 2023–2024: Series expansion and decline ===
The release of SuperStar STAYC was announced on May 9, 2023, with the game being released on May 17. The game was featured on STAYC's Swith Gelato Factory fan meeting concert in Seoul from May 19–21 via a promotional booth.

On July 26, IT Chosun reported that Dalcomsoft had recorded sales of ₩17.5 billion, but an operating loss of ₩2.6 billion and a net loss of ₩2.9 billion, raising concerns about the longevity of its games, which faced declining stock prices and required significant restructuring. SuperStar Woollim shut down the following year, following concerns over the handling of the game's updates and events.

SuperStar Philippines, featuring artists from ABS-CBN Music, was released on October 11 by Dalcomsoft US. Dalcomsoft Japan released SuperStar Ebidan the following day, which featured artists from the music collective Ebidan under Stardust Promotion.

== Games ==
Release timeline Active releases in bold
2014	**SuperStar SM Town**
2015
2016	**SuperStar JYP Nation**
2017
2018	SuperStar BTS
2019	SuperStar Pledis
2019	**SuperStar Starship**
2020	SuperStar Woollim
2020	SuperStar Iz*One
2020	SuperStar GFriend
2020	SuperStar YG
2020	SuperStar FNC
2021	The SuperStar
2021	SuperStar Kang Daniel
2021	SuperStar P Nation
2021	**SuperStar Ateez**
2021	SuperStar Brand New
2021	SuperStar The Boyz
2022	SuperStar Classy
2022	SuperStar Oh My Girl
2022	SuperStar Loona
2022	SuperStar Lapone
2023	**SuperStar High Up**
2023	**SuperStar Philippines**
2023	**SuperStar Ebidan**
2024	SuperStar Thailand
2024	**SuperStar Wakeone**
2025
2026	**SuperStar TheBlackLabel**
2026	**SuperStar LDH**

=== Dalcomsoft ===
SuperStar SM Town
The first installment of the series was initially released on August 2014 on the Google Play Store for Android devices. The game features artists from SM Entertainment, with an initial roster including BoA, TVXQ, Super Junior and its subunit Super Junior-M, Girls' Generation, Shinee, f(x), as well as the Korean and Chinese subunits of Exo, Exo-K and Exo-M. A Chinese version of SuperStar SM Town was co-published by Chukong and Daum Kakao on March 2015.

SuperStar JYP Nation
SuperStar JYP Nation was released on July 1, 2016, as a partnership with JYP Entertainment. Its initial lineup featured J.Y. Park, Wonder Girls, Sunmi, 2AM, 2PM, Miss A, Got7, Baek A-yeon, 15& and Twice. It was released in Thailand, Hong Kong, Singapore, the Philippines and Indonesia on December 22, 2017.

SuperStar BTS
SuperStar BTS was released on January 18, 2018. The game was discontinued on June 23, 2020.

SuperStar Pledis
It was released on January 29, 2019. Pre-orders for the game began on January 8, 2019, and featured artists under Pledis Entertainment, including NU'EST, Seventeen, Pristin, Bumzu and Raina.

SuperStar Starship
The game launched on October 23, 2019 and features artists from Starship Entertainment, including K.Will, Soyou, Monsta X, WJSN, Jeong Se-woon, Yoo Seung-woo and Mind U.

SuperStar Woollim
The game was first announced on February 26, 2020, by Woollim Entertainment, revealing the game would launch on the first half of the year. Released on April 20, the game featured Infinite, Lovelyz, Golden Child and Rocket Punch in its initial lineup. Other artists including Kwon Eun-bi, Lovelyz member Lee Su-jeong and Drippin were added in later updates. The game was discontinued on April 30, 2024, following concerns over updates and events not being properly conducted since late 2023.

SuperStar GFriend
Released on June 15, 2020.

SuperStar YG
Released on November 5, 2020, the game's roster featured artists from YG Entertainment, initially including Big Bang, AKMU, Winner, iKon, Blackpink, Sechskies and Treasure. Jisoo, Jennie and Treasure sub-unit T5 were included in future updates. A Japanese version developed by Dalcomsoft Japan was released on December 2020. The game shut down on January 31, 2025.

SuperStar FNC
It features artists from FNC Entertainment, including F.T. Island, CNBLUE, AOA, N.Flying, SF9, Cherry Bullet and P1Harmony. After being listed for pre-order on November 11, 2020, the game was released on December 2. Subsequent content updates included promotional events for concerts and tours, including Jung Yong-hwa's All-Rounder, SF9's Delight in Seoul and P1Harmony's P1ustage H : P1oneer.

SuperStar Kang Daniel
Released on April 29, 2021.

SuperStar P Nation
P Nation's SuperStar game was released on app markets on May 27, 2021. Its roster included Hyuna, Jessi, Crush, Heize, Penomeco, Dawn and D.Ark. Through a partnership with the SBS show Loud, the game added cover versions by the show's contestants of Wanna One's "Boomerang" and "Energetic", Block B's "Her" and an original song titled "Cchill". Other updates added Psy and Suga's "That That", TNX's "Move" and "We On" and Hwasa's "I Love My Body".

SuperStar Ateez
Released on August 18, 2021.

SuperStar Brand New
Released on November 17, 2021.

SuperStar The Boyz
Released on December 14, 2021.

SuperStar Classy
Released on February 23, 2022, as SuperStar Teenage Girls. Later rebranded to SuperStar Classy on May 6, 2022, following the show's final group debut.

SuperStar Oh My Girl
Released on March 14, 2022.

SuperStar Loona
Released on October 14, 2022.

SuperStar HighUp
Originally released as SuperStar STAYC on May 17, 2023, the game was re-released as SuperStar HighUp on April 23, 2026, following the debut of girl group Unchild.

SuperStar WakeOne
Released in December 4, 2024.

SuperStar TheBlackLabel
Released on March 31, 2026.

=== Dalcomsoft Japan ===
Superstar Iz*One
Released on April 23, 2020.

SuperStar Lapone
Released on November 24, 2022.

SuperStar Ebidan
Released on October 12, 2023.

SuperStar LDH
Released on April 22, 2026.

=== Dalcomsoft US ===
The SuperStar
The SuperStar launched on April 1, 2021, as a partnership with Interscope Records. The game's initial lineup featured Selena Gomez, Billie Eilish, Lady Gaga, Imagine Dragons, Rae Sremmurd, Ellie Goulding and Zedd. The April 1 release was later clarified to be a beta, with a "global open" release taking place on July 1, adding American rapper Juice Wrld posthumously to the game's roster. Australian electronic group Rüfüs Du Sol was added on July 15, in promotion of their single "Alive". The addition of American singer-songwriter Olivia Rodrigo took place on August 24, with songs "Good 4 U" and "Drivers License".

SuperStar Philippines
Released on October 11, 2023.

SuperStar Thailand
Released on July 2, 2024.

== Other adaptations ==
=== Nintendo Switch version ===
An adaptation of the SuperStar series for the video game console Nintendo Switch was planned for release. Developed by Dalcomsoft, the version was planned for release in November 2019. Dalcomsoft CEO Kim Hyun-geol said the adaptation's goal was to make the series "accessible to all artists and enjoyable across all countries and platforms".

=== International versions ===
In partnership with Ponos Corporation, SuperStar SM Town was released in localized versions for Japan and Taiwan. Japanese localization and publishing are now handled by Dalcomsoft Japan, which operates the Japanese version of SuperStar JYP Nation and has released titles including SuperStar Ebidan and SuperStar LDH.

After Dalcomsoft initially launched a Chinese version of SuperStar SM Town in 2015 in partnership with Chukong and Daum Kakao, game publisher Valofe announced on July 30, 2026, that it had acquired the publishing license for the SuperStar series in China. Valofe stated that it would begin service in the region with SuperStar SM Town, followed by other titles in the series.
