= Urban Music Awards Australia and New Zealand =

Former music awards show

The Urban Music Awards Australia and New Zealand were established in 2006 as a means of celebrating hip hop, soul and R&B acts throughout the two countries. Two awards ceremonies were held, in 2006 and 2007.

The first show aired on Friday 21 July 2006 at Sydney's Homebush State Sports Centre and was presented by Jazzy Jeff and Kurtis Blow. The 2007 awards were held on Tuesday 14 August at Sydney's Milsons Point Luna Park.

Winners were decided by public votes from nominees selected by a panel of music industry figures (with the exception of the "Best DJ" and "Best Club Night" awards, which are purely public voted; and the "Best Producer" and "Urban Hero" awards, which were industry-voted only).

== Locations ==
- 2006 - Sydney's Homebush State Sports Centre
- 2007 - Sydney's Milsons Point Luna Park

== Award winners ==
=== 2006 ===
- Best Hip Hop Single: Scribe and P-Money - Stop the Music
- Best R&B Single: Savage - Moonshine
- Best Hip Hop Album: Savage - Moonshine
- Best R&B Album: Jade MacRae - Jade MacRae
- Best Male Artist: Guy Sebastian
- Best Female Artist: Jade McRae
- Best R&B Group: Random
- Best R&B Single: Savage - Moonshine
- Best Hip Hop Group: Hilltop Hoods
- Best New Talent: FiggKidd
- Best DJ (Australia): Nino Brown
- Best DJ (New Zealand): P-Money
- Best Club Night (Australia): Candy Shop
- Best Club Night (New Zealand): RnB Superclub
- Best Video Clip: Guy Sebastian - Oh Oh
- Best Radio Show: K Sera and the Dirty Dozen
- Urban Hero Award: Brotha D - Dawn Raid
- Best International Act: Kanye West

=== 2007 ===
- Best Hip Hop Single: Phrase - Hold On
- Best R&B Single: Israel - My Girl
- Best Hip Hop Album: Hilltop Hoods - The Hard Road
- Best R&B Album: Guy Sebastian - Closer to the Sun
- Best Male Artist: Tyree
- Best Female Artist: Jade MacRae
- Best New Talent: Justice & Kaos
- Best Hip Hop Group: Hilltop Hoods
- Best R&B Group: Kid Confucius
- Best DJ (Australia): Nino Brown
- Best DJ (New Zealand): DJ Sir-Vere
- Best Club Night (Australia): Redroom
- Best Club Night (New Zealand): RnB Superclub
- Best Radio Show: Stolen Records
- Best Video Clip: Phrase - Hold On
- Best Producer: P-Money
- Best Unsigned Artist: Jess Harlen
- Urban Hero Award: Doug Williams
