= Get Me Home =

- Re-Issued Cover

Studio album by Jade MacRae
- Released: 4 October 2008 (Australia)
- Recorded: 2007–2008
- Genre: R&B, Pop
- Label: Sony BMG
- Producer: Adrian Newman, Warryn Campbell, M-Phazes, Jan Skubiszewski, Focus, Darryl Anthony

Jade MacRae chronology
| Jade MacRae (2005) | Get Me Home (2008) | Handle Me with Care (2020) |

Alternative covers
- Cover before release push-back

Get Me Home is the second studio album from Australian singer Jade MacRae. Originally scheduled for release on 5 November 2007, the release date was pushed back on numerous occasions but finally saw a release on 4 October 2008.

== Track listing ==
1. Emergency
2. Low
3. Run to You
4. I Wanna Be In Love
5. Get Me Home
6. In the Basement (Album Version)
7. Trouble
8. Shine Like a Diamond
9. You're Gone
10. Next to Me
11. Under the Sheets
12. Final Chapter
13. Fly Away

iTunes Bonus Track

- 14 Shoulda Loved You More

=== Original release track list ===
1. Run to You (A Newman/J MacRae)
2. Low (A Newman/J MacRae)
3. In the Basement (J MacRae/A Birgisson)
4. You're Gone (A Newman/J MacRae)
5. Get Me Home (A Wollbeck/M Lindblom/J MacRae)
6. Under the Sheets (A Newman/J MacRae)
7. Trouble (A Newman/J MacRae)
8. Fly Away (A Newman/J MacRae)
9. Emergency (A Newman/J MacRae)
10. Next to Me (J MacRae/D A Hawes/B Edwards)
11. Shine Like a Diamond (W Campbell/J MacRae)
12. Final Chapter (A Newman/J MacRae)

== Singles ==
In late 2007, the first single "In the Basement" failed to grab attention and only peaked at #60 on the ARIA single charts. Almost a year later second single "I Wanna Be in Love" was released to radio on 21 July, and was a digital single only. It has failed to make any impact, on any chart.

== Release history ==
| Country | Release date | Format | Label |
|---|---|---|---|
| Australia | 4 October 2008 | CD Album, Digital Download | Workstation Records |
