= In the Basement (song) =

Single by Jade MacRae

from the album Get Me Home
- B-side: "Next to Me"
- Released: 22 September 2007
- Label: Workstation Records
- Songwriter(s): Jade MacRae; Arnthor Birgisson
- Producer(s): Arnthor Birgisson

Jade MacRae singles chronology
"Superstar" (2005)	"In the Basement" (2007)	"I Wanna Be in Love" (2008)

"In the Basement" is a song by Australian singer Jade MacRae. It was released on 22 September 2007 as the lead single from her second album, Get Me Home (2008), and reached number 60 on the ARIA Singles Chart.

MacRae said of the song, "I wrote 'In the Basement' on a whirlwind writing trip to Sweden in early 2007. I was lucky enough to work with Arnthor Birgisson, one of the incredible writers from Max Martin's famous Maratone Studios in Stockholm. We had one day together. He had a huge collection of vintage synths and we ended up with a banging electro club track."

"In the Basement" won the 2008 APRA songwriting award for "Urban Work of the Year".

== Video ==
The music video for "In the Basement" features Bobby Morley (who MacRae was partnered with during season 2 of It Takes Two). Choreography by Marko Panzic, who would later go on to reach the Top 20 in season one of So You Think You Can Dance Australia.

== Track listing ==
CD single

1. "In the Basement"
2. "In the Basement" (M-Phazes remix)
3. "Next to Me"
4. "In the Basement" (BP remix)

== Charts ==
Chart (2007)	Peak position
Australia (ARIA)	60
