= Jade MacRae (album) =

Studio album by Jade MacRae
- Released: 19 September 2005 (Australia)
- Recorded: 2004–2005
- Genre: R&B
- Length: 46:20
- Label: Sony BMG
- Producer: Israel; Papagenius! & The C-Note Music Group, Jade Macrae, Clayton Doley, Mark Lizotte, Jarrad Rogers, Prince Ali, Mahalia Barnes, Juanita Tippins

Jade MacRae chronology
Jade MacRae (2005)	Get Me Home (2008)

Jade MacRae is the debut studio album of Australian singer, Jade MacRae and debuted and peaked at number 61 on the ARIA Charts. The album features the singles "You Make Me Weak", "So Hot Right Now" and "Superstar".

At the ARIA Music Awards of 2006, the album was nominated for Best Urban Release and Best Female Artist.

== Track listing ==
1. "You Make Me Weak" (MacRae, Israel) – 3:57
2. "So Hot Right Now" (Django Rheinhardt, Stephane Grappelli, MacRae, Israel) – 3:45
3. "All My Love" (MacRae, Warryn Campbell) – 3:32
4. "Up and Do Your Thing" (MacRae, Paul Bushnell, Paul Graham, Cornelius Mims) – 3:08
5. "I Like It" (MacRae, Jarrad Rogers) – 3:12
6. "Superstar" (MacRae, Israel) – 3:24
7. "I'm Your Lady" (MacRae, Bushnell, Graham, Mims) – 4:49
8. "Feel" (MacRae, Clayton Doley, Mahalia Barnes, Juanta Tippins) – 4:50
9. "Nothing From Nothing" (MacRae, Mark Lizotte) – 4:06
10. "I'm Alright" (MacRae, Doley) – 3:25
11. "Real Thing" (MacRae) – 3:22
12. "Take Me As I Am" (MacRae, Gary Pinto) – 4:52

== Charts ==
Chart (2005)	Peak position
Australian Albums (ARIA)	61
