= So Hot Right Now (Jade MacRae song) =

- Cd Cover

Single by Jade MacRae

from the album Jade MacRae
- A-side: "So Hot Right Now"
- B-side: "Feel"
- Released: 14 February 2005
- Recorded: 2005
- Genre: R&B
- Length: 3:14
- Label: Roadshow Music
- Songwriters: Django Reinhardt, Stephane Grappelli, MacRae, Israel Cruz

Jade MacRae singles chronology
| "You Make Me Weak" (2004) | "So Hot Right Now" (2005) | "Superstar" (2005) |

"So Hot Right Now" is a song by Australian musician Jade MacRae and was released in February 2005 as the second single from her self-titled debut album Jade MacRae. The song peaked at number 18 on the ARIA Charts.

== Video ==
The scene for the video is set in a club with a bar and sees Jade and all her girls with their boyfriends hanging out, as Jade follows the camera as it changes angles. The video then fades out to Jade singing with her band behind her at the same club, before fading out a second time to Jade's fellow R&B star Israel who also produced her album, as he adds his rap to the track, before going back to Jade as she performs to the crowd.

== Track listing ==
CD Single

1. "So Hot Right Now" (Single Version)
2. "So Hot Right Now" (Alternative Elite Fleet Remix)
3. "So Hot Right Now" (A.K.47 Remix)
4. "Feel"
5. "So Hot Right Now" (Album version)

== Charts ==
| Chart (2005) | Peak position |
|---|---|
| Australia (ARIA) | 18 |
| Australian Urban (ARIA) | 6 |
