= Popstar (disambiguation) =

A popstar is a person who is famous for singing pop music.

Popstar or pop star may also refer to:

== Film and TV ==
- Popstar (film), a 2005 direct-to-video film
- Popstar: Never Stop Never Stopping, a 2016 mockumentary comedy film
- Pop Star, a 2013 film featuring Christian Serratos, Rachele Brooke Smith, and Ross Thomas

=== Television ===
- Popstar (TV series), a Brazilian daytime live celebrity singing competition
- Popstars, an international popular music reality series franchise
  - Popstars (Brazilian TV series)
  - Popstars (Dutch TV series)
  - Popstars (French TV series)
  - Popstars (German TV series)
  - Popstars (Mexican TV series)
  - Popstars (Portuguese TV series)
  - Popstars (British TV series)
  - Popstars: The Rivals, British series
  - Popstars Live, Australian series

== Music ==
=== Albums ===
- Pop Star (album), a 2020 album by Yanga Chief
- Popstar (Tinashe album), 2026
- Popstar: A Dream Come True, a 2003 debut album of Filipino singer Sarah Geronimo
- Popstars (Hear'Say album), 2001
- Popstars (Lollipop album), 2001
- Popstars, a 2001 album by American girl group Eden's Crush
- Popstars, a 2002 album by French band Whatfor

=== Songs ===
- "Pop Star (Ken Hirai song)", a 2005 Japanese song by Ken Hirai
- "Popstar" (DJ Khaled song), 2020
- "Popstar" (Jon Nørgaard song), 2005
- "Pop/Stars", a 2018 song by virtual K-pop girl group K/DA
- "Pop Star", a 1970 song by British singer Cat Stevens
- "Pop Star", a 1981 song by Toyah from the album Anthem
- "Popstar", a 1995 song by the Scatman John from the album Scatman's World
- "Popstar", a 1999 song by the Pretenders from the album ¡Viva El Amor!
- "Pop Star", a 2019 song by American rapper DaBaby

== Other uses ==
- Popstar, the main planet where the Kirby series takes place
