= Superstar (Jade MacRae song) =

- CD Cover

Single by Jade MacRae

from the album Jade MacRae
- A-side: "Superstar"
- B-side: "Lazy Afternoon"
- Released: 5 September 2005
- Recorded: 2005
- Genre: R&B
- Length: 3:16
- Label: Roadshow Music
- Songwriters: Macrae, Israel
- Producer: Israel

Jade MacRae singles chronology
"So Hot Right Now" (2005)	"Superstar" (2005)	"In the Basement" (2007)

"Superstar" is a song by Australian musician Jade MacRae and was released in September 2005 as the third and final single from her debut album Jade MacRae. "Superstar" features a rap from Sydney-based rapper 6Pound.

== Music video ==
The music video was filmed in a factory in Melbourne. The video consists of Jade singing and dancing in an underground club with different people.

== Track listing ==
CD Single

1. "Superstar" (Radio edit)
2. "Superstar" (Crooked Eye remix)
3. "Lazy Afternoon"

== Charts ==
Chart (2005)	Peak position
Australia (ARIA)	32
Australian Urban (ARIA)	12
