= SuperStar SM Town =

2014 video game

SuperStar SMTOWN
- Developer: Dalcomsoft Inc.
- Platforms: iOS, Android
- Release: August 15, 2014
- Genre: Music

SuperStar SMTOWN is a South Korean rhythm game developed by Dalcomsoft, Inc. which was first launched on Google Play in August 2014. The game features songs by artists of the entertainment company SM Entertainment. The game is available in Asia and the US, and is playable in English, Korean, Spanish, Portuguese, Indonesian, and Turkish. The game is part of the SuperStar video game series.

The goal is to complete a song and unlock the following song in three levels: Easy, Normal and Hard. As of September 6, 2023, the game features more than 950 songs from 72 solo artists, groups and units of SM Entertainment.

In July 2016, Pulse News reported that the game has over 8 million downloads and has raised ₩10 billion ($8.8 million) in cumulative revenue since its release. The game reached 10 million downloads on May 2, 2018.

== Background and history ==
SM Entertainment, a South Korean entertainment company, aimed for a game featuring SM Town, its stable of singers. Daum Kakao jointly published the game with China's mobile game publisher, Chukong.

== Gameplay ==
Like most rhythm games, players tap descending colored objects when they align with the bar at the bottom of the screen, the goal being to accumulate points. Tapping the objects in time correctly, and consecutively without any misses, gives bonus points. After each song, scores are recorded and enables the player to compare scores with other players online. With enough points, a player can go up a rank on the weekly chart (starting from Bronze, to Silver, Gold, Platinum and finally Master with each being divided into three levels respectively).

Songs from various artists of SM Entertainment are featured in the game. Previously until 2017 updates, after completing a song, a new song is unlocked. The goal is to unlock all the songs in all three levels, Easy, Normal and Hard, which is not anymore applicable to the late 2017-now updates. The same 600+ songs must be unlocked in the three levels. After beating all three levels, the 'Challenge' mode will be unlocked. 'Star Cards' (Cards that feature the solo artists and individual group members of SM Entertainment) is also a feature of the game. New cards are earned after completing a song, although a player may purchase them from the game's store in packs. When equipped, cards enable the player to gain more points, with an even bigger advantage if the player collects all the cards that corresponds to the theme of the group or artist. These cards can also be used to enhance other cards to gain more bonus. As of January 13, 2021, there are over 1400+ star cards (including normal and limited edition) to collect in the game.

== Soundtrack ==
SuperStar SM Town has more than 950 songs from 70 of SM Entertainment's boy bands, girl groups, sub-groups and solo artists, namely: Kangta, BoA, TVXQ!, U-Know, Max, Super Junior, Kyuhyun, Super Junior-D&E, M&D, Ryeowook, Yesung, Super Junior-K.R.Y., Super Junior-M, Henry, Zhou Mi, Sungmin, Donghae, Eunhyuk, Girls' Generation, Girls' Generation-TTS, Girls' Generation-Oh!GG, Taeyeon, Tiffany, Seohyun, DJ Hyo, Yoona, Yuri, Shinee, Taemin, Jonghyun, Key, Onew, Minho, F(x), Amber, Luna, Exo, Exo-K, Exo-M, Lay, Exo-CBX, Chen, Baekhyun, Exo-SC, Suho, Kai, D.O., Xiumin, Red Velvet, Red Velvet – Irene & Seulgi, Wendy, Joy, Seulgi, NCT U, NCT 127, NCT Dream, WayV, WayV – Kun & Xiaojun, Mark, NCT DoJaeJung, Taeyong, Ten, Doyoung, Lucas, SuperM, Aespa, Got the Beat, Riize, NCT Wish and Hearts2Hearts. Songs by the SM special group like SM the Ballad and SM Town are also included. The songs must be unlocked in all three levels of the game; easy, normal and hard.
