= Jesus Christ Superstar (disambiguation) =

Jesus Christ Superstar is a musical by Tim Rice and Andrew Lloyd Webber, the title may also refer to:

Uses related to the above stage musical:

- Jesus Christ Superstar (album), the original album that led to all further musical productions including the above stage musical
- Cast recordings:
  - Jesus Christ Superstar (Original Australian Cast Recording)
  - Jesus Christ Superstar (1972 Swedish cast)
  - Jesus Christ Superstar (1996 London Cast), Andrew Lloyd Webber's revival version
- Jesus Christ Superstar (film), 1973 American film adaptation, directed by Norman Jewison
  - For the 2000 remake of it, directed by Gale Edwards, see Jesus Christ Superstar#Films
  - Jesus Christ Superstar (film soundtrack), the soundtrack to the 1973 film
- Jesus Christ Superstar Live in Concert, 2018 American live television adaptation

Other uses

- Jesus Christ Superstars, an album by Laibach

== See also ==
- Superstar (Jesus Christ Superstar song), the title song and final musical number from Jesus Christ Superstar, and a hit single for several artists
