= Superstar (2015 film) =

- Directed by: Toni Abulu
- Produced by: Toni Abulu
- Production company: Black Ivory Limited
- Distributed by: Silverbird Distributions
- Release dates: June 5, 2015
- Country: Nigeria
- Language: English

Superstar is a Nollywood movie produced and directed by US born Nigerian producer Toni Abulu, the CEO of Black Ivory Limited, an entertainment company with over 30 years experience in film making. The movie shows a story of a Nigerian artist (Tekno) who struggles in the Nigerian music industry. The film premiered on June 5, 2015 courtesy of Silverbird Distributions. The film features Nigerian young artist Tekno and Iyanya which make it there first time acting on a TV show.

== Overview ==
Tekno (as Modele or Dele) and his friend (his manager, Ovie) in the movie have dropped out from the university in order to pursue a music career. He has to undergo a lot of obstacles starting from his family who do not agree on the idea of a music career. Tekno came across an opportunity to present a mixtape to an American producer who is searching for young talents in Nigeria. Toyin Aimakhu was brought in the movie as Tekno's mother and it was her first time acting an English speaking role in a film.

== Cast ==
The main characters in the movie are:

- Tekno (as Modele or Dele)
- Ovie as Ushebebe
- Toyin Aimakhu
- Steph Nora Okere
