= Chukong Technologies =

Mobile entertainment platform company

- Type: Private
- Industry: Video games
- Founded: November 12, 2010
- Headquarters: Beijing
- Website: www.chukong-inc.com

Chukong Technologies
- Traditional Chinese: 北京觸控科技有限公司
- Simplified Chinese: 北京触控科技有限公司
Transcriptions
Standard Mandarin
- Hanyu Pinyin: Běijīng Chùkòng Kējì Yǒuxiàn Gōngsī

Chukong Technologies (also known as Chukong) is an international mobile entertainment platform company headquartered in Beijing. Chukong maintains four core business practices: game engine development, mobile game development, publishing, and developer community support. In January 2014, Chukong was named the third largest Chinese mobile developer. In addition to its headquarters in Beijing, Chukong Technologies also has offices in Menlo Park, Tokyo, Seoul, and Taipei.

In February 2014, sources reported that Chukong Technologies was planning to file for a $150 million IPO in the United States. Within months, plans for the IPO was postponed indefinitely due to lower than expected valuation and was eventually shelved.

== History ==
In 2008, Gary (Guanqun) Liu, a Chinese technologist and software developer, created CocoaChina.com, an Internet forum for Chinese developers to discuss iOS development related topics. In 2009, Haozhi Chen, a serial entrepreneur and angel investor, invested in the forum and established Chukong Technologies as a mobile gaming development company with Liu.

In November 2010, Chukong closed a Series A funding round for $1.2 million from Northern Light Venture Capital. The company later received Series B ($14 million) from Steamboat Ventures, Sequoia Capital and Northern Light, Series C ($18 million) from GGV and previous investors, and Series D ($50 million) led by New Horizon Capital and joined by previous investors. As of February 2014, the company had received $83.2 million in funding. Chukong's flagship title Fishing Joy was developed internally and launched in April 2011. The company started its third-party game publishing business in 2012. In 2012, the company also invested into Cocos2d-x, an open source game engine, and later acquired the company that maintains the engine. On October 10, 2013, Chukong reorganized its sub-brands under the Chukong Technologies name—the company had formerly operated as CocoaChina—and officially integrated the Cocos2D-x engine into its corporate structure.

== Game Development ==
Chukong's most successful title to date has been Fishing Joy, a casual game published first in 2011. The game has been especially popular in China, and as of November 2012 the game had been downloaded 120 million times. The game's sequel, Fishing Joy 2, was also well received by players: In January 2013, Chukong announced that Fishing Joy was making more than $2 million a month on Android, and by March of the same year that figure had grown to $6 million a month and 10 million daily active users.

=== List of Chukong Games ===
- Fishing Joy (Android/iOS)
- Fishing Joy 2 (iOS)
- Pocket Climber (iOS)
- Cosmic Crashers (iOS)

== Game Publishing ==
Chukong has acted as a third party publishing partner for mobile games since 2012, helping domestic and international game developers distribute and publish games around the world with a focus on the greater China region. On July 26, 2013, Chukong announced that the company was generating more than $12 million a month in revenue, based in part on their developer relationships.

=== List of Games Published ===
- I’m MT
- Space Hunter
- Chaos Fighters
- 神雕侠侣
- Dungeon & Fighters
- Contra: Evolution
- Where’s My Water
- Where’s My Water 2
- 凡人修真
- 疾风勇者传
- Where’s My Mickey
- Where’s My Perry
- 战国
- Stack Rabit
- MetalStorm Aces

== Developer Forum ==
Chukong continues to operate the CocoaChina developer forum founded in 2008.

== Cocos 2D-x Game Engine ==
Chukong Technologies also maintains and leads development on the Cocos2D-x game engine, an open-source cross-platform development engine used by 400,000 developers around the world including leading studios like Zynga, Konami, GREE, and Glu.
