= Daniel Merriweather discography =

Discography of Australian singer Daniel Merriweather

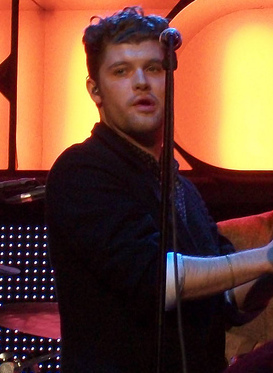
- Merriweather performing in 2008
- Studio albums: 2
- Extended plays: 2
- Singles: 6
- Music videos: 10
- Promotional singles: 2
- Music video appearances: 8

This article provides a discography of the official releases by Australian singer Daniel Merriweather.

== Studio albums ==
List of studio albums, with selected details
Title	Album details	Peak chart positions								Certifications
Title	Album details	AUS	AUT	DEN	GER	IRL	NLD	SWI	UK	Certifications
Love & War	Released: 1 June 2009; Label: Marlin, Universal, Allido, RCA, J; Format: CD, digital download, LP	32	28	12	34	15	59	8	2	BPI: Platinum

== Extended plays ==
Year	EP
2004	Merriweather: Promotional EP
2008	iTunes Live: London Sessions: Digital-only EP

== Singles ==
Title	Year	Peak chart positions									Certifications	Album
Title	Year	AUS	AUT	BEL (Fl)	DEN	GER	IRL	NLD	SWI	UK	Certifications	Album
"City Rules" (featuring Saigon)	2004	76	—	—	—	—	—	—	—	—		Non-album single
"She's Got Me"	2004	69	—	—	—	—	—	—	—	—		Non-album single
"Change" (featuring Wale)	2009	41	11	16* (Ultratip)	—	13	—	31	6	8		Love & War
"Red"	2009	65	—	—	5	—	9	—	—	5	BPI: Platinum	Love & War
"Impossible"	2009	—	—	—	—	39	—	—	52	67		Love & War
"Water and a Flame" (featuring Adele)	2009	—	—	—	—	—	—	—	—	180		Love & War
"Everything I Need"	2019	—	—	—	—	—	—	—	—	—		Seven Wonders (collaborative album)
"Rain"	2020	—	—	—	—	—	—	—	—	—		Non-album single
"—" denotes releases that did not chart or were not released in that territory.

*Did not appear in the official Belgian Ultratop 50 charts, but rather in the bubbling under Ultratip charts.

=== As a featured artist ===
Title	Year	Peak chart positions							Album
Title	Year	AUS	BEL (Fl)	GER	IRL	ITA	SWI	UK	Album
"Catch Phrase" (Phrase featuring Daniel Merriweather)	2006	—	—	—	—	—	—	—	Talk with Force
"Stop Me" (Mark Ronson featuring Daniel Merriweather)	2007	64	—	65	38	23	11	2	Version
"Cash in My Pocket" (Wiley featuring Daniel Merriweather)	2008	—	—	—	—	—	—	18	See Clear Now
"Naïve Bravado" (Urthboy featuring Daniel Merriweather)	2012	—	—	—	—	—	—	—	Smokey's Haunt
"I Never" (The Bamboos featuring Daniel Merriweather)	2012	—	—	—	—	—	—	—	Medicine Man
"Simple Man" (Diafrix featuring Daniel Merriweather)	2012	—	—	—	—	—	—	—	Pocket Full of Dreams
"Losin' Streak" (Cookin' on 3 Burners featuring Daniel Merriweather)	2014	—	—	—	—	—	—	—	Blind Bet
"Only Can Get Better" (Silk City featuring Diplo, Mark Ronson and Daniel Merriweather)	2018	—	Tip**	—	—	—	—	—	Electricity
"—" denotes releases that did not chart or were not released in that territory.

*Did not appear in the official Belgian Ultratop 50 charts, but rather in the bubbling under Ultratip charts under the section "Extra hits" without any position being specified for the song.

=== Promotional singles ===
Year	Song	Album
2006	"Tied Up" (Juse featuring Ethical and Daniel Merriweather)	Global Casino
2008	"Chainsaw"	Love & War

== Guest/soundtrack appearances ==
- A Little Bit Better Arthur (film) (Original Motion Picture Soundtrack) (2011)
- All I Want (w/Disco Montego), Disco Montego (album) (2002)
- Another Way Down (w/Harmonic), One Last Ride (soundtrack album) (2005)
- Breakadawn (w/Rhymefest), Man In The Mirror (mixtape) (2007)
- Bloodlust (w/Pnau) Again (album) (2003)
- Can't Buy You Arthur (film) (Original Motion Picture Soundtrack) (2011)
- Catch Phrase (w/Phrase) Talk With Force (album) (2005)
- Caught Up (w/ Brad Strut) Legend: Official (album) (2007)
- Chains (w/Phrase) Clockwork (album) (2009)
- Come Fly With Me (w/Mystro) Diggi Down Unda (album) (2006)
- Dazed Arthur (film) (Original Motion Picture Soundtrack) (2011)
- Does She Like It (w/Phrase) Talk With Force (album)(2005)
- Four Seasons (w/Jase) Jase Connection Vol. 1 (album) (2006)
- Heart & Soul (w/Phrase) Talk With Force (album) (2006)
- Let's Ride (w/Wale) 100 Miles & Running (mixtape) (2007)
- Maybe (feat. Lee Sissing); Hating Alison Ashley (Various Artists soundtrack album) (2005)
- Money In My Pocket (w/ Wiley) See Clear Now (album) (2008)
- Pot Of Gold (w/ Wale), 10 Deep Presents The New Deal (v/a mixtape) (2008)
- Stop Me (AKA "Stop Me Medley") (w/Mark Ronson) Version (2007)
- The End (songwriting credits) (SugaRush Beat Company feat. Michael Franti of Spearhead) SugaRush Beat Company (2008)
- Tied Up (w/ Juse), Global Casino (album) (2006)
- Tied Up Pt. 2 (w/ Ethical), Ages Turn (album) (2008)
- Who Is She? (w/DJ Peril) King Of The Beats (album) (2006)
- War (w/Wale) More About Nothing (mixtape) (2010)

In 2005, Merriweather recorded vocals for a song by Freeway, but this track remains unreleased.

== Videography ==
=== Music videos ===
Year	Music video	Director
2004	"City Rules" (feat. Saigon)	Bart Borghesi
2004	"She's Got Me"	
2006	"Catch Phrase" (with Phrase)	
2006	"Tied Up" (with Juse, Phrase and Ethical)	Andy Morton
2007	"Stop Me" (UK version) (with Mark Ronson)	Scott Lyon
2007	"Stop Me" (US version) (with Mark Ronson) (US version)	Matt Lenski
	"Tied Up, Part 2" (with Ethical)	DJ Jimmy Olsen
	"Cash in My Pocket" (with Wiley)	Kim Gehrig
	"Change" (feat. Wale)	Elliot Jokelson
	"Red"	Anthony Mandler
	"Impossible"	Anthony Mandler
	"Water and a Flame" (feat. Adele)	

=== Music video appearances ===
Year	Music video	Director
2007	"Oh My God" (Mark Ronson feat. Lily Allen)	Nima Nourizadeh
