= ARIA Award for Best Urban Album =

Former Australian music award

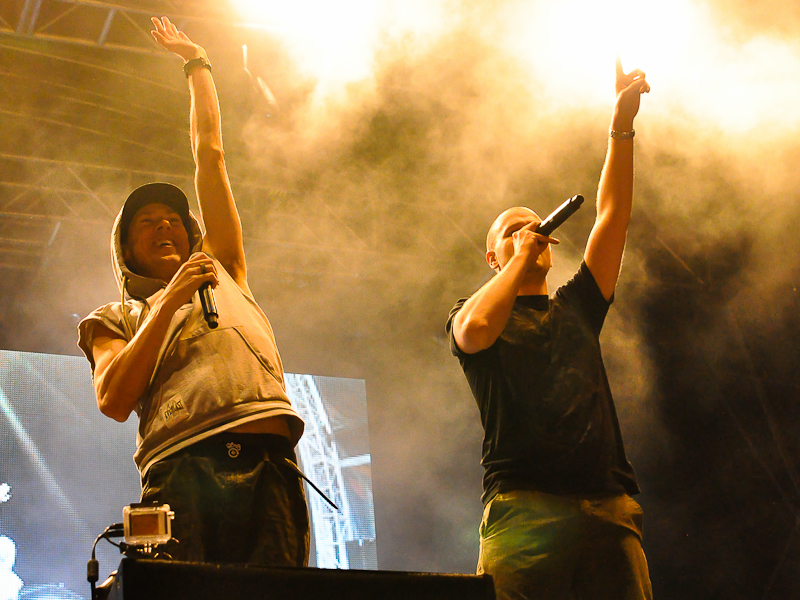
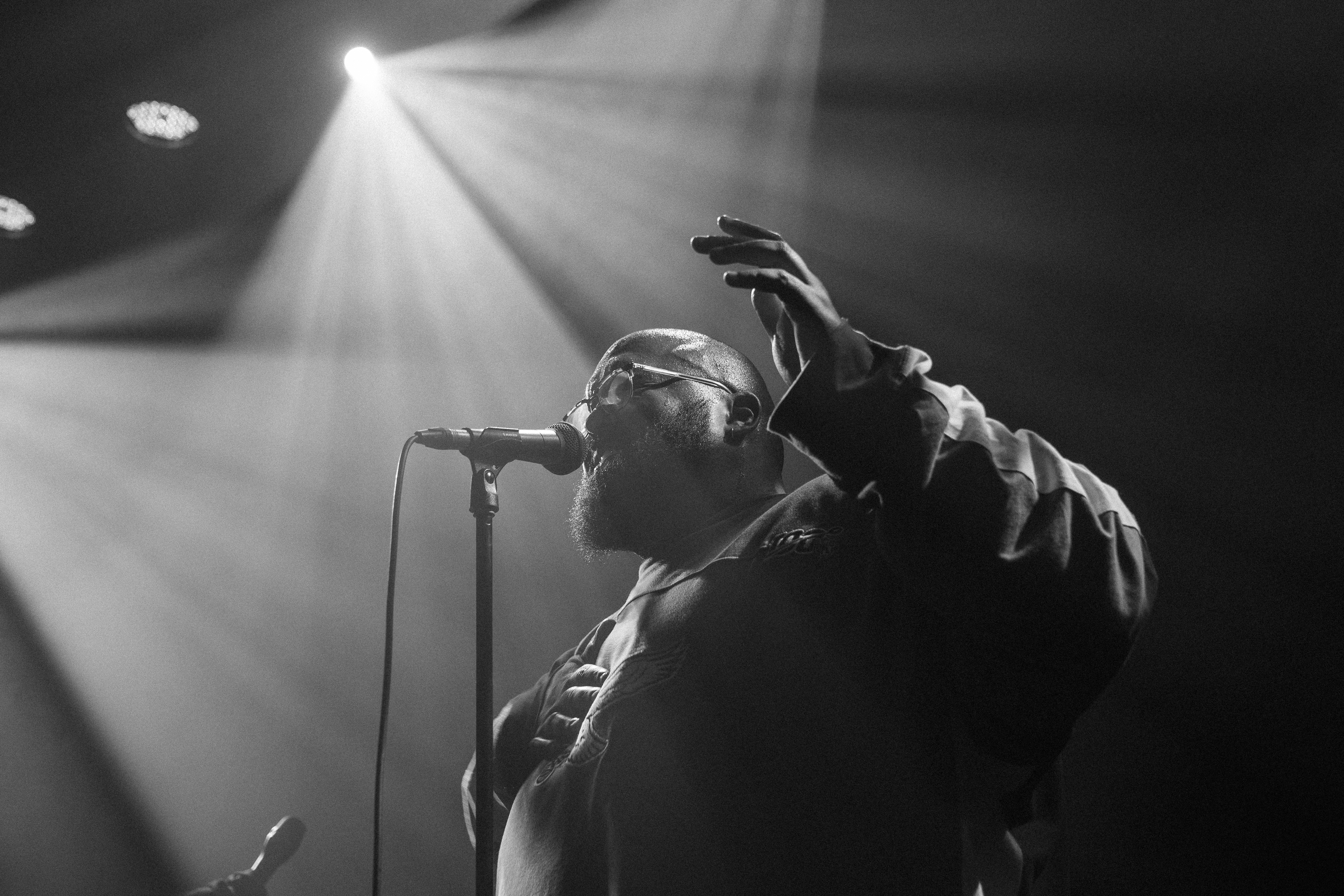
- 2018 winners Hilltop Hoods (left) and Adrian Eagle (right)
- Country: Australia
- Presented by: Australian Recording Industry Association (ARIA)
- First award: 2004
- Final award: 2018
- Currently held by: Hilltop Hoods featuring Adrian Eagle, "Clark Griswold" (2018)

Highlights
- Most awards: Hilltop Hoods (6)
- Most nominations: Hilltop Hoods (6)
- Website: ariaawards.com.au

The ARIA Music Award for Best Urban Album, was an award presented at the annual ARIA Music Awards, which recognises "the many achievements of Aussie artists across all music genres", since 1987. It was handed out by the Australian Recording Industry Association (ARIA), an organisation whose aim is "to advance the interests of the Australian record industry." Best Urban Album was first presented as Best Urban Release in 2004, for an album or single released by a solo artist or group until 2010, where it changed to Best Urban Album.

To be eligible, the work must have been within the RnB, hip-hop, soul, funk, reggae and dancehall genres. In the case of a remixed or re-worked album, it was eligible provided that: it was not a final five nominee in any other category; contain 50% new lyrical and musical content; the artist(s) and production team meet the artist eligibility criteria; and the ARIA member entering the album must choose the artist or production team as the recipient of the award. The nominated album must qualify for inclusion in the ARIA Album Chart, and cannot be entered in any other genre categories. The accolade was voted for by a judging school, which comprises between 40 and 100 members of representatives experienced in this genre, and is given to an artist who is either from Australia or an Australian resident.

The award for Best Urban Album was first presented as Best Urban Release to Koolism in 2004, for their album Part 3 - Random Thoughts. Hilltop Hoods won all six of their nominations, more than any other artist, for The Hard Road in 2006, The Hard Road: Restrung in 2007, State of the Art in 2009, Drinking from the Sun in 2012, Walking Under Stars in 2014 and the final award, as Best Urban Release, for "Clark Griswold" along with featured artist Adrian Eagle in 2018. Drapht was the only other artist to win multiple awards in this category, winning both his nominations for The Life of Riley in 2011 and Seven Mirrors in 2016. It was replaced by two categories, Best Hip Hop Release and Best Soul/R&B Release, in 2019.

== Winners and nominees ==
In the following table, the winner is highlighted in a separate colour, and in boldface; the nominees are those that are not highlighted or in boldface.

Winner marked in a separate colour

=== Best Urban Release (2004–2009) ===
Year	Winner(s)	Album/single title
**2004** (18th)
**2004** (18th)	**Koolism**	**Part 3 - Random Thoughts**
**2004** (18th)	1200 Techniques	Consistency Theory
**2004** (18th)	Daniel Merriweather	"City Rules"
**2004** (18th)	The Cat Empire	The Cat Empire
**2004** (18th)	J Wess	J Wess Presents Tha LP
**2005** (19th)
**2005** (19th)	**Daniel Merriweather**	**"She's Got Me"**
**2005** (19th)	Butterfingers	"Figjam"
**2005** (19th)	Jade MacRae	"So Hot Right Now"
**2005** (19th)	Joel Turner and the Modern Day Poets	Joel Turner and the Modern Day Poets
**2005** (19th)	Weapon X and Ken Hell	"Otherman"
**2006** (20th)
**2006** (20th)	**Hilltop Hoods**	**The Hard Road**
**2006** (20th)	Bliss n Eso	"Up Jumped the Boogie"
**2006** (20th)	Jade MacRae	Jade MacRae
**2006** (20th)	Phrase	Talk with Force
**2006** (20th)	Weapon X and Ken Hell	Sneakerpimpin' Ain't Easy
**2007** (21st)
**2007** (21st)	**Hilltop Hoods**	**The Hard Road: Restrung**
**2007** (21st)	Bliss n Eso	Day of the Dog Phazed Out
**2007** (21st)	Foreign Heights	Get Yours Remix
**2007** (21st)	Jackson Jackson	The Fire Is on the Bird
**2007** (21st)	Justice & Kaos	Turn It On
**2008** (22nd)
**2008** (22nd)	**Bliss n Eso**	**Flying Colours**
**2008** (22nd)	A-Love	Ace of Hearts
**2008** (22nd)	Katalyst	What's Happening
**2008** (22nd)	Muph & Plutonic	...And Then Tomorrow Came
**2008** (22nd)	Spit Syndicate	Towards the Light
**2008** (22nd)	The Herd	Summerland
**2009** (23rd)
**2009** (23rd)	**Hilltop Hoods**	**State of the Art**
**2009** (23rd)	Astronomy Class	Pursuit of Happiness
**2009** (23rd)	Horrorshow	The Grey Space
**2009** (23rd)	Pez	A Mind of My Own
**2009** (23rd)	Phrase	Clockwork

=== Best Urban Album (2010–2017) ===
Year	Winner(s)	Album title
**2010** (24th)
**2010** (24th)	**M-Phazes**	**Good Gracious**
**2010** (24th)	Bliss n Eso	Running on Air
**2010** (24th)	Lowrider	Round the World
**2010** (24th)	Space Invadas	Soul-Fi
**2010** (24th)	Urthboy	Spitshine
**2011** (25th)
**2011** (25th)	**Drapht**	**The Life of Riley**
**2011** (25th)	Illy	The Chase
**2011** (25th)	Koolism	The 'Umu
**2011** (25th)	Phrase	Babylon
**2011** (25th)	Vents	Marked for Death
**2012** (26th)
**2012** (26th)	**Hilltop Hoods**	**Drinking from the Sun**
**2012** (26th)	360	Falling & Flying
**2012** (26th)	Katalyst	Deep Impressions
**2012** (26th)	The Bamboos	Medicine Man
**2012** (26th)	The Herd	Future Shade
**2013** (27th)
**2013** (27th)	**Illy**	**Bring It Back**
**2013** (27th)	Bliss n Eso	Circus in the Sky
**2013** (27th)	Horrorshow	King Amongst Many
**2013** (27th)	Seth Sentry	This Was Tomorrow
**2013** (27th)	Urthboy	Smokey's Haunt
**2014** (28th)
**2014** (28th)	**Hilltop Hoods**	**Walking Under Stars**
**2014** (28th)	360	Utopia
**2014** (28th)	Iggy Azalea	The New Classic
**2014** (28th)	Illy	Cinematic
**2014** (28th)	Thundamentals	So We Can Remember
**2015** (29th)
**2015** (29th)	**Seth Sentry**	**Strange New Past**
**2015** (29th)	Citizen Kay	Demokracy
**2015** (29th)	Hiatus Kaiyote	Choose Your Weapon
**2015** (29th)	The Meeting Tree	R U a Cop
**2015** (29th)	Tuka	Life Death Time Eternal
**2016** (30th)
**2016** (30th)	**Drapht**	**Seven Mirrors**
**2016** (30th)	Citizen Kay	With The People
**2016** (30th)	Koi Child	Koi Child
**2016** (30th)	L-FRESH The LION	Become
**2016** (30th)	Urthboy	The Past Beats Inside Me Like a Second Heartbeat
**2017** (31st)
**2017** (31st)	**A.B. Original**	**Reclaim Australia**
**2017** (31st)	Illy	Two Degrees
**2017** (31st)	Remi	Divas & Demons
**2017** (31st)	Thundamentals	Everyone We Know
**2017** (31st)	Tkay Maidza	Tkay

=== Best Urban Release (2018) ===
Year	Winner(s)	Album/single title
**2018** (32nd)
**2018** (32nd)	**Hilltop Hoods (featuring Adrian Eagle)**	**"Clark Griswold"**
**2018** (32nd)	360	Vintage Modern
**2018** (32nd)	Esoterik	My Astral Plane
**2018** (32nd)	Kerser	Engraved in the Game
**2018** (32nd)	Mojo Juju	Native Tongue

== Artists with multiple wins ==
6 wins

- Hilltop Hoods

2 wins

- Drapht

== Artists with multiple nominations ==
6 nominations

- Esoterik (Note: Including five as a member of Bliss n Eso.)
- Hilltop Hoods

5 nominations

- Bliss n Eso

4 nominations

- Illy

3 nominations

- 360
- Phrase
- Tuka (Note: Including two as a member of Thundamentals.)
- Urthboy

2 nominations

- Citizen Kay
- Drapht
- The Herd
- Horrorshow
- Katalyst
- Koolism
- Jade MacRae
- Daniel Merriweather
- Seth Sentry
- Thundamentals
- Weapon X & Ken Hell
