= Utopia (360 album) =

Studio album by 360
- Released: 13 June 2014
- Recorded: 2013–14
- Genre: Australian hip hop
- Length: 57:58 (standard); 1:09:15 (deluxe)
- Label: Forthwrite

360 chronology
Falling & Flying (2011)	Utopia (2014)	Vintage Modern (2017)

Singles from Utopia
- 1. "Impossible" Released: 17 January 2014; 2. "Sixavelli" Released: 27 March 2014; 3. "Live It Up" Released: 3 April 2014; 4. "Price of Fame" Released: 9 June 2014

Utopia is the third studio album by Australian rapper 360. It was released on 13 June 2014. It features four singles; "Impossible" featuring Daniel Johns, "Sixavelli" which features rapper Lunar C, "Live It Up" which features Australian rapper Pez and "Price of Fame" which features singer Gossling.

== Background ==
In June 2012, 360 revealed to national youth broadcaster Triple J that he was already working on his third album.

== Singles ==
"Impossible" featuring Daniel Johns was released 1 January 2014. "Sixavelli" featuring Lunar C was released 27 March 2014. "Live It Up" featuring PEZ was released 3 April 2014. "Price of Fame" featuring Gossling was released 9 June 2014.

== Track listing ==
Utopia – Standard version
No.	Title	Writer(s)	Producer(s)	Length
1.	"Still Rap"	Matthew Colwell, Vojtesak	Nic Martin, Charlie Handsome	3:57
2.	"You and I"	Colwell	Styalz Fuego, Nic Martin	3:46
3.	"Live It Up" (feat. PEZ)	Colwell, Perry Chapman	Styalz Fuego, Nic Martin	3:48
4.	"Man On the Moon"	Colwell	Nic Martin	4:41
5.	"Purple Waterfall" (feat. Daniel Johns)	Colwell, Daniel Johns	Styalz Fuego	4:03
6.	"Price of Fame" (feat. Gossling)	Colwell	Styalz Fuego	3:36
7.	"Must Come Down" (feat. PEZ)	Colwell, Chapman	M-Phazes, S1	1:31
8.	"Speed Limit"	Colwell, Vojtesak	Charlie Handsome	2:56
9.	"Early Warning" (feat. Chris Cheney)	Colwell		4:31
10.	"Sixavelli" (feat. Lunar C)	Colwell, Lunar C	Styalz Fuego	3:49
11.	"Eddie Jones" (feat. Miracle)	Colwell, Miracle	Styalz Fuego	4:10
12.	"Spiral Down"	Colwell	Styalz Fuego	4:13
13.	"By All Means"	Colwell, Vojtesak	Charlie Handsome	4:54
14.	"It's All About to End" (feat. Daniel Johns)	Colwell, Johns		5:34

Utopia – Deluxe version (bonus tracks)
No.	Title	Writer(s)	Producer(s)	Length
15.	"Break the Rules"	Colwell	Stylaz Fuego & Charlie Handsome	4:05
16.	"Tell These Bitches"	Colwell, Vojtesak	Charlie Handsome	3:08
17.	"Impossible" (feat. Daniel Johns)	Colwell, Johns		4:04

== Charts ==
=== Weekly charts ===
Chart (2014)	Peak position
Australian Albums (ARIA)	2
New Zealand Albums (RMNZ)	27

=== Year-end charts ===
Chart (2014)	Position
Australian Albums (ARIA)	42
Australian Artist Albums (ARIA)	16
