= Brett Wood =

Australian musician based in Melbourne (born 1980)

Brett Wood (born 31 March 1980) is an Australian musician based in Melbourne.

== Early life ==
Wood attended Montmorency Secondary College and grew up in the north/eastern suburb of Greensborough. At the age of 14 he began teaching himself guitar and after a year his talent came to the attention of Australian guitar legend Tommy Emmanuel. After hearing Brett play in person (brett age 15), Tommy began inviting the young musician to guest perform at his shows. In 1999 Wood travelled with Tommy to the US to perform at the Chet Atkins Appreciation Society Convention. Wood had the honour of meeting and playing for Chet Atkins and was asked to return to the convention the following year to perform at the convention. In 2000 after returning home from the states Wood was honoured to win the "Young Guitarist of the Year Award" at the Frankston International Guitar Festival.

== 2000 ==
At the age of 20 Wood released his first solo instrumental album "Turn It Up..." The album was reviewed by Australian Guitar Magazine as "sheer guitar wizardry" Wood has recorded on many Australian albums and has appeared on well known TV shows including: Good Morning Australia, Dancing with the Stars, Today, The Footy Show (AFL & NRL), and Rove.

== 2009 ==
In 2009 Wood co-wrote "Outta Here" with Australian vocalist Michelle Berner who won the Vega 30+ Suburban Superstar competition. The song was recorded at Chong Lim's (John Farnham's Musical Director) studio and was added to the Vega play list gaining much praise and support from fans and music industry professionals. Wood was the Lead Guitarist for Australian Singer/Songwriter Pete Murray and toured both with the full band and also as an acoustic duo with Pete across Australia, Europe and the UK.

== 2010 ==
Wood accompanied Pete Murray to Los Angeles where they recorded original Blue Sky Blue release (not the Byron Sessions version). There they recorded at Sunset Sound with legendary producer Tom Rothrock known for his involvement with the Foo Fighters, Beck, Elliott Smith and James Blunt. Wood performed guitar on all tracks and also co-wrote two songs that made the final cut, "Tattoo Stained" and "Hold It All For Love".

== 2011 ==
In 2011 Wood played guitar on several tracks on the album Falling & Flying by Melbourne hip hop artist 360, including the singles Child, Boys Like You, Killer, and Run Alone.

== 2012 ==
After years of working alongside Pete Murray, and after a tour of Europe and Australia to support the album "Blue Sky Blue", Wood resigned from his position in the band to pursue other opportunities. He joined Melbourne based hard/classic rock band Electric Mary to tour Australia, Japan, Europe and the UK. The tour was titled 'Back in the EU-UK'.
