= Seth Sentry =

Australian hip hop recording artist

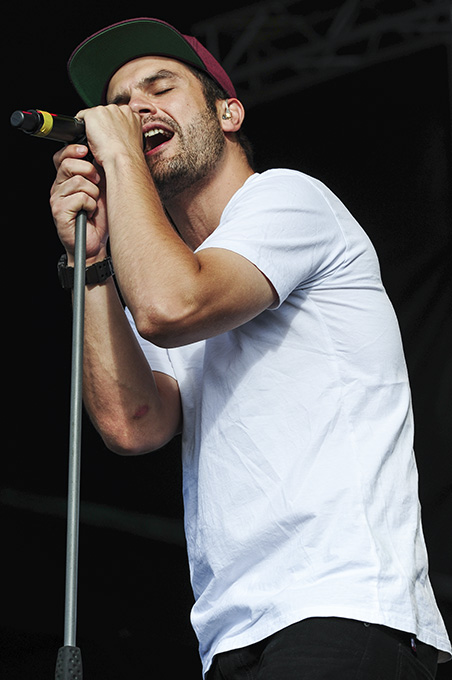
- Sentry, Groovin' the Moo; Hay Park, Bunbury, May 2013

Background information
- Born: Seth Marton
- Genres: Hip hop
- Occupations: Rapper; singer
- Years active: 2003–present
- Label: High Score
- Website: sethsentry.com

Seth Marton, who performs by his stage name Seth Sentry, is an Australian hip hop recording artist. He has released one extended play and three studio albums. At the ARIA Music Awards of 2015, he won the ARIA Award for Best Urban Album for his second album, Strange New Past. He was the first Australian rapper to perform on a US talk show, Jimmy Kimmel Live!, and has headlined shows all around the country.

== Biography ==
Seth Sentry grew up in Sorrento, Melbourne. Sentry's first public appearances were during live performances with Melbourne hip hop and drum and bass outfit, D.S.O.L. in 2003. In 2005 he reached third place in the Revolver Battles competition, in addition to organising and appearing in a weekly hip hop night at The Old Colonial venue in Fitzroy—Sentry's involvement with the Old Colonial led to an appearance on The Forthwrite Mixtape in 2007 and a guest appearance on Pez's 2008 album, A Mind of My Own.

After posting a number of songs on Triple J's Unearthed website, he was selected by Steph Hughes, host of the station's Home & Hosed programme, as a "Featured Artist". Sentry's "The Waitress Song" became the most downloaded track on the website and went on to reach No. 31 in Triple J's Hottest 100 of 2009 and appeared on the compilation The Best of Australian Hip Hop Vol. 1. "Simple Game", Sentry's second single, received high rotation on Triple J. He followed with a 31-date national tour supporting Pez.

In November 2008 Sentry independently released his debut EP, The Waiter Minute, consisting of five songs including his previously released singles. Accompanying the upload to Facebook of the conscious track "Strange Lot", he stated that he "wrote most of it in between train rides back and forth to work."

In 2010, Sentry continued to tour and finalised the recording of his debut album with Melbourne producer Matik. In August 2010, he was a guest on Horrorshow's "Our Song", ahead of a national tour with the group, and "Closer", a song by Australian hip hop artist 360.

Sentry's debut album This Was Tomorrow was released on 14 September 2012 on his label, High Score Records (distributed by Inertia Records). It was selected as the Triple J feature album in the week of its release. The album debuted at No. 6 on the ARIA Albums Chart and remained in the top 50 for six weeks. Two of its singles, "Dear Science" and "Float Away", were listed in Triple J's Hottest 100 of 2012 at No. 26 and No. 57, respectively.

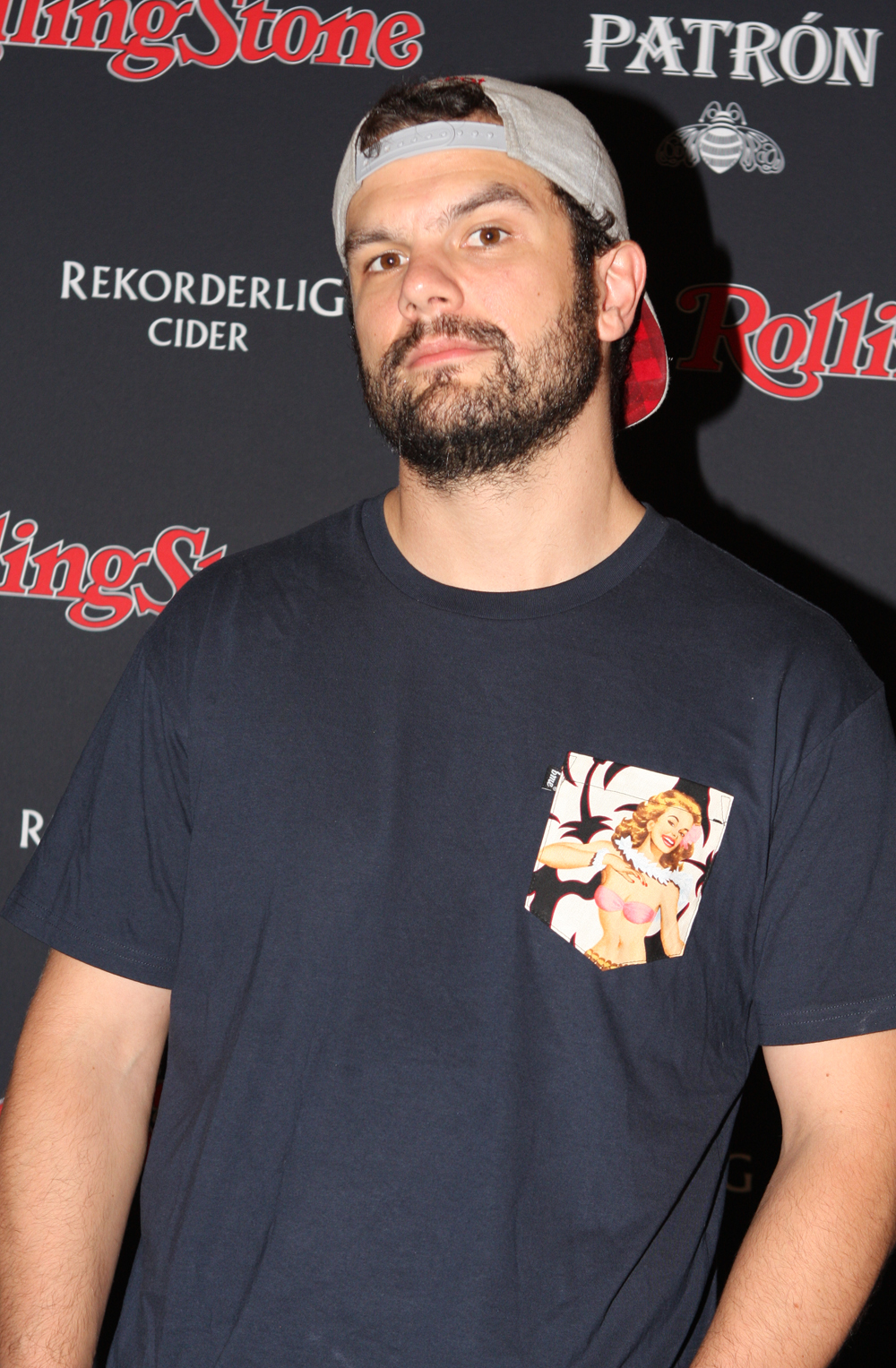
Sentry in 2013

In April 2013, Sentry performed on the American late-night talk show Jimmy Kimmel Live! singing "Dear Science" and "Float Away". He was the first Australian rapper to ever feature on a US talk show. In May 2013, Sentry completed the 'Dear Science' Australian tour, before announcing the larger 'Vacation' tour that featured support from Mantra and Grey Ghost.

On 5 June 2015, Sentry released his second studio album, Strange New Past, which peaked at No. 2 on the ARIA Albums Chart. It was also selected as Triple J's feature album. At the ARIA Music Awards of 2015 it won Best Urban Album. In that same year Sentry broke the record for the largest Australian Regional Tour with 50 shows across the country.

In May 2021, Sentry announced his third studio album, Super Cool Tree House, which compiles songs released on YouTube during the COVID-19 pandemic. The album was released on 18 June 2021.

== Personal life ==
Marton grew up in Sorrento, a small coastal town in Victoria. He is an avid gamer, sometimes referencing video games in his songs and posting YouTube videos in which he answers fan questions while playing video games. He also built his own rap battle video game in 2020 called Keyboard Warriors.

== Discography ==
=== Studio albums ===
Title	Details	Peak chart positions	Certification
Title	Details	AUS	Certification
This Was Tomorrow	Released: 14 September 2012; Label: High Score (HIGH002); Format: CD, digital download, LP	6	ARIA: Gold
Strange New Past	Released: 5 June 2015; Label: High Score (HIGH003); Format: CD, digital download, LP, streaming	2	
Super Cool Tree House	Released: 18 June 2021; Label: High Score; Format: Digital download, streaming	65	

=== Extended plays ===
Title	Details	Certifications
The Waiter Minute EP	Released: November 2008; Format: CD, digital download	ARIA: Platinum

=== Singles ===
List of charity singles, with selected chart positions
Title	Year	Peak chart positions	Certifications	Album
Title	Year	AUS	Certifications	Album
"The Waitress Song"	2008	—	ARIA: Platinum	The Waiter Minute
"My Scene"	2012	—		This Was Tomorrow
"Float Away"	2012	98	ARIA: Gold	This Was Tomorrow
"Dear Science"	2013	—	ARIA: Gold	This Was Tomorrow
"Reservoir Dogs" (with Bliss n Eso, 360, Pez and Drapht)	2013	96		Circus in the Sky
"Run"	2014	76		Strange New Past
"Hell Boy"	2015	86		Strange New Past
"Dumb"	2015	—		Strange New Past
"Fake Champagne"	2015	—		Strange New Past
"1969"	2016	—		Strange New Past
"Petty"	2016	—		non album singles
"Play It Safe"	2017	—		non album singles
"Wrong One"	2019	—		non album singles
"Castlevania"	2021	—		Super Cool Tree House
"Paranoia"	2025	—		

== Awards ==
In 2012, Sentry won Channel V's Oz Artist of the Year award.

=== AIR Awards ===
The Australian Independent Record Awards (commonly known informally as AIR Awards) is an annual awards night to recognise, promote and celebrate the success of Australia's Independent Music sector.

Year	Nominee / work	Award	Result
2013	himself	Breakthrough Independent Artist	Nominated
2013	This Was Tomorrow	Best Independent Hip Hop/Urban Album	Won

=== APRA Awards ===
The APRA Awards are held in Australia and New Zealand by the Australasian Performing Right Association to recognise songwriting skills, sales and airplay performance by its members annually.

Year	Nominee / work	Award	Result	Ref.
2013	Seth Sentry	Breakthrough Songwriter of the Year	Nominated	
2016	"1969"	Song of the Year	Shortlisted	

=== ARIA Music Awards ===
The ARIA Music Awards are annual awards, which recognises excellence, innovation, and achievement across all genres of Australian music. Sentry has won one award from two nominations.

Year	Nominee / work	Award	Result
2013	This Was Tomorrow	Best Urban Album	Nominated
2015	Strange New Past	Best Urban Album	Won

=== J Award ===
The J Awards are an annual series of Australian music awards that were established by the Australian Broadcasting Corporation's youth-focused radio station Triple J. They commenced in 2005.

Year	Nominee / work	Award	Result
2009	himself	Unearthed Artist of the Year	Nominated
2015	Strange New Past	Australian Album of the Year	Nominated

== See also ==
- Hilltop Hoods
- Golden Era Records
