= Jackson Jackson =

Hip hop group from Melbourne, Australia

- Origin: Melbourne, Victoria, Australia
- Genre: Hip hop
- Years active: 2006–present
- Label: EMI Australia
- Members: Harry James Angus; Jan Skubiszewski

Jackson Jackson are an Australian hip hop duo from Melbourne consisting of Harry James Angus (vocals/trumpet; The Cat Empire, The Conglomerate) and Jan Skubiszewski (producer, phrase, and composer; APRA Award winner Two Hands, The Rage in Placid Lake, Last Man Standing). For live performances, they are joined by keyboards, bass, drums and backup vocalists.

Jackson Jackson's first album, The Fire Is on the Bird, was released on 24 March 2007. They describe their music as a fusion of hip hop, afrobeat and psychobilly.

The duo generated a loyal following through exposure on Myspace, YouTube and on the late-night ABC music video show Rage.

Jackson Jackson's second album, Tools For Survival, was released on 11 October 2008.

The band appeared as a guest on Phrase's second album Clockwork in 2009, performing on the song "Paradise".

In April 2010, Jackson Jackson performed at The Evelyn in Melbourne for three Fridays in a row before going on hiatus to write a new album.

In September 2011, Jackson Jackson returned to The Evelyn Hotel to take residency of the venue for a month, performing each Friday. Their first show since April 2010 was Friday 2 September, and was supported by the singer Gossling. During their performance, they performed two new songs called "Dave" and "Sacrifice". They also sold a three-track EP, consisting of the tracks "Dave", "Sacrifice", and "Simplify My Life, Amplify My Mind".

== Band members ==
=== Core members ===
Jackson Jackson are:

- Harry Angus – vocals, acoustic guitar and synths
- Jan Skubiszewski – electric/acoustic guitars, synths and beats

=== Rhythm section ===
Also known as Melbourne dub/fusion trio, 'The Genie', and the rhythm section of Melbourne band The Cat Empire.

- Ollie McGill – keyboards
- Ryan Monro – basses and guitar
- Will Hull-Brown – drums

=== Choir ===
Named the 'Jackson Jackson 5'.

- Chantal Mitvalsky
- Elana Stone
- Rebecca Ari
- Karishma Sadhai
- Rory Osman

== Discography ==
=== Albums ===
List of albums, with selected details and chart positions
Title	Album details	Peak chart positions
Title	Album details	AUS
The Fire Is on the Bird	Released: March 2007; Format: CD; Label:	—
Tools for Survival	Released: October 2008; Format: CD; Label: Virgin (242119-2)	45

=== Singles ===
List of singles, with selected chart positions
Title	Year	Peak chart positions
Title	Year	AUS
"All Alone"	2008	96
"The Devil in Me"	2009	—
"Dave"	2011	—

=== Other appearances ===
- Clockwork (2009)
- Underbelly: A Tale of Two Cities (Soundtrack) (2009)
