= Live It Up (360 song) =

Single by 360 featuring Pez

from the album Utopia
- Released: 3 April 2014
- Recorded: 2014
- Genre: Hip hop
- Length: 3:48
- Label: EMI
- Songwriters: Matthew James Colwell; Perry Chapman

360 featuring Pez singles chronology
"Sixavelli" (2014)	"Live It Up" (2014)	"Price of Fame" (2014)

"Live It Up" is a song by Australian rapper 360, featuring vocals from Pez. Written by Dennis Dowlut, Styalz Fuego Matthew James Colwell and Perry Chapman, the song was released in April 2014 as the third single from 360's third studio album, Utopia (2014). The song's accompanying music video runs for approximately three minutes and fifty-nine seconds. "Live It Up" was a moderate commercial success, debuting and peaking at number twenty-one on the Australian ARIA Singles Chart, thus becoming 360's third highest-charting single to date after "Boys like You" (No. 3 in 2012) and "Price of Fame" (No. 19 in 2014) respectively. It was certified gold by the Australian Recording Industry Association (ARIA) for shipments in excess of 35,000 copies.

== Background ==
During an interview with themusic.com.au, 360 commented, "Live It Up is a song I wrote with Pez; it's about living what little time you have here to the fullest. It's also about trying to find positives in negative situations. We only have one life so why not make it the best time ever?"

== Charts ==
Chart (2014)	Peak position
Australia (ARIA)	21

== Certifications ==
Region	Certification	Certified units/sales
Australia (ARIA)	Gold	35,000^{^}
^{^} Shipments figures based on certification alone.
