= Water and a Flame =

2009 single by Daniel Merriweather featuring Adele

Single by Daniel Merriweather featuring Adele

from the album Love & War
- Released: 2 November 2009
- Studio: Modern Dirt Laboratories (London)
- Length: 3:39
- Label: Columbia
- Songwriters: Eg White; Daniel Merriweather
- Producer: Eg White

Daniel Merriweather singles chronology
"Impossible" (2009)	"Water and a Flame" (2009)	"Naïve Bravado" (2012)

Adele singles chronology
"Make You Feel My Love" (2008)	"Water and a Flame" (2009)	"Rolling in the Deep" (2010)

Music video
- "Water and a Flame" on YouTube

"Water and a Flame" is a song recorded by Australian singer Daniel Merriweather for his debut solo album, Love & War. It features guest vocals by English singer-songwriter Adele. Released as the album's fourth and final single on 2 November 2009, the track was produced by Eg White and issued through Columbia Records. It reached number 180 on the UK Singles Chart. In 2013, Canadian singer Celine Dion recorded a cover version for her album Loved Me Back to Life, also produced by White.

== Composition ==
"Water and a Flame"
"Water and a Flame", described as a smoky, heartfelt ballad.

"Water and a Flame" has been described as a smoky, emotional ballad. David Balls of Digital Spy wrote that the song "finds their rich and soulful vocals dovetailing sweetly – enough to draw attention away from the slightly clichéd chorus".

== Formats and track listing ==
- Digital single
1. "Water and a Flame" (featuring Adele) – 3:39
2. "Water and a Flame" (featuring Adele) (Buzz Junkies club mix) – 7:16

== Charts ==
Chart performance
Chart (2009)	Peak position
UK Singles (Official Charts Company)	180

== Celine Dion version ==
"Water and a Flame"

Promotional single by Celine Dion

from the album Loved Me Back to Life
- Released: 6 February 2014
- Recorded: 2012
- Studio: Abbey Road (London); Eg White (London); Echo Beach (Jupiter); Larrabee Sound (North Hollywood)
- Genre: Pop
- Length: 3:42
- Label: Columbia
- Songwriters: Eg White; Daniel Merriweather
- Producer: Eg White

Audio
- "Water and a Flame" on YouTube

Canadian singer Celine Dion recorded "Water and a Flame" for her 2013 album Loved Me Back to Life. The track was produced by Eg White and issued as the album's third single in the United Kingdom. It was added to the A List on the BBC Radio 2 playlist on 6 February 2014, and a commercial single was scheduled for release on 24 March 2014. On 11 April 2014, the song was sent to Contemporary hit radio in Italy.

=== Background and release ===
On 8 August 2012, Le Journal de Montréal reported that Dion's forthcoming English-language album would include material written and produced by Eg White, known for his work with Adele on 19 and 21. A preview of "Water and a Flame" premiered on The Katie Couric Show on 25 April 2013, followed by behind-the-scenes footage released on Dion's official website.

On 29 August 2013, Billboard described Loved Me Back to Life as Dion's edgiest album to date and noted that "Water and a Flame" highlights the lower, grainier register of her voice. A "Making of Water and a Flame" video was released on Dion's Vevo channel on 30 October 2013, and the official audio premiered on 5 November 2013.

Eg White also co-wrote and produced "Didn't Know Love" for the album. On 6 February 2014, Dion's website confirmed "Water and a Flame" as the third UK single. Although a commercial single was planned for 24 March 2014, it was withdrawn shortly before release. The song reached number thirty on the UK Radio Airplay Chart in early March 2014. It was later sent to Italian radio on 11 April 2014.

=== Controversy ===
Loved Me Back to Life was initially intended to be titled Water and a Flame. During an April 2013 appearance on The Katie Couric Show, Dion introduced her recording of the song. When asked about the album title, Dion and her husband/manager René Angélil referred to the song without mentioning its original writers.

Musician Samantha Ronson, a friend of Daniel Merriweather, criticized Dion in a blog post, arguing that artists should acknowledge the creators of songs they cover. Merriweather later echoed the criticism on his Facebook page, expressing frustration that Dion appeared to present the song as her own.

Dion's management responded that Dion frequently does not mention songwriters in interviews, that she has always been open about not writing her own material, and that all contributors were credited in the album's liner notes. On 25 July 2013, Dion's website confirmed the album's new title, Loved Me Back to Life.

=== Critical reception ===
"Water and a Flame" received positive reviews from critics. Stephen Thomas Erlewine selected it as a track pick in his review of Loved Me Back to Life for AllMusic. The New York Times noted that the song carries an R&B influence and would fit seamlessly into Dion's Las Vegas show.

Jim Farber of the Daily News described it as reminiscent of Amy Winehouse and praised Dion's expressive phrasing. Mike Wass of Idolator called the track an inspired choice that places Dion in a retro soul setting.

=== Live performances ===
Dion first performed "Water and a Flame" on Today on 28 October 2013. She performed it again the following day at the Edison Ballroom in New York City.

Andrew Hampp of Billboard praised her rendition, describing it as a "gin-soaked" breakup ballad. The song was later included in the setlist of Dion's Sans attendre Tour (2013). A performance from one of her Paris shows was included as a bonus track on Céline une seule fois / Live 2013 (2014). Dion also performed the song on the Today Show on 22 July 2016.

=== Credits and personnel ===
==== Recording ====
- Recorded at Abbey Road Studios, London (strings) and Eg White Studio, London (other instruments)
- Vocals recorded at Echo Beach Studios, Jupiter, Florida
- Mixed at Larrabee Studios, North Hollywood, Los Angeles

==== Personnel ====
- Eg White – songwriting, production, recording engineer, bass, drums, percussion, guitar, piano, string arrangement
- Daniel Merriweather – songwriting
- François Lalonde – vocals recording
- Raymond Holzknecht – vocals recording assistant
- Manny Marroquin – mixing
- Chris Galland – mixing assistant
- Delbert Bowers – mixing assistant
- Janice Graham – violin
- Magnus Johnston – violin
- Marije Ploemacher – violin
- Jonathan Evans Jones – violin
- Annabelle Meare – violin
- Harvey de Souza – violin
- Hannah Dawson – violin
- Helen Cox – violin
- Beatrix Lovejoy – violin
- Kotno Sato – violin
- Timothy Grant – viola
- Becky Low – viola
- Simone van der Giessen – viola
- Richard Harwood – cello
- Rowena Calvert – cello
- Jassie Anne Richardson – cello

=== Charts ===
Chart performance
Chart (2014)	Peak position
UK Airplay (OCC)	30

=== Release history ===
Release history
Region	Date	Format	Label	Ref.
United Kingdom	6 February 2014	Adult Contemporary radio	Columbia	
Italy	11 April 2014	Contemporary hit radio	Columbia	
