= Clockwork (Phrase album) =

Studio album by Phrase
- Released: 27 April 2009
- Genre: Hip hop
- Length: 64:00
- Label: Universal

Phrase chronology
| Talk with Force (2005) | Clockwork (2009) |

Professional ratings
Review scores
| Source | Rating |
|---|---|
| Canberra Times | (positive) |
| The Age | 3.5/5 stars |

Clockwork is the second studio album by Phrase. Originally intended for a late 2007 release it was put out in April 2009. It includes collaborations with Bliss n Eso, Jackson Jackson and Daniel Merriweather and has guest appearances by Kram and Wendy Matthews. Clockwork was nominated for an ARIA for best urban album, nominated for Triple J's album of the year and was feature album on Triple J.

At the J Awards of 2009, the album was nominated for Australian Album of the Year.

== Track listing ==
1. "Intro"
2. "Burn It Down" (featuring Max White)
3. "Clockwork"
4. "Spaceship"
5. "Sky Light" (featuring Kram)
6. "The Day You Went Away" (featuring Wendy Matthews)
7. "All Good"
8. "Paradise" (featuring Jackson Jackson)
9. "Stay the Same"
10. "Chains" (featuring Daniel Merriweather)
11. "Back to the Street"
12. "Surrender" (featuring Illy)
13. "Push Up"
14. "Persistence" (featuring Bliss n Eso)
15. "TV N Radio"
16. "Street Lights"

== Charts ==
Chart performance for Clockwork
| Chart (2009) | Peak position |
|---|---|
| Australian Albums (ARIA) | 26 |
