= Strange New Past =

Studio album by Seth Sentry
- Released: 5 June 2015
- Studio: The Base Recording Studios, South Melbourne
- Label: High Score Records

Seth Sentry chronology
This Was Tomorrow (2012)	Strange New Past (2015)	Super Cool Tree House (2021)

Singles from Strange New Past
- 1. "Run" Released: December 2014; 2. "Hell Boy" Released: 6 May 2015; 3. "Dumb" Released: 18 September 2015; 4. "Fake Champagne" Released: November 2015; 5. "1969" Released: April 2016

Strange New Past is the second studio album by Australian musician Seth Sentry. Released in June 2015, the album peaked at number 2 on the ARIA Charts.

At the ARIA Music Awards of 2015 it won the ARIA Award for Best Urban Album.

== Reception ==
Jonty Simmons from Beat Magazine called the album "..a mature successor" to Sentry's 2012 debut This Was Tomorrow saying "In 'Violin', Sentry pours out his heart and soul for his absentee mother. It's an album highlight that epitomises the changes Sentry has gone through during his journey to success. With his trademark cheek finally applied to something other than shying away from responsibility, Strange New Past is a huge step forward for Seth Sentry.

== Track listing ==
All tracks are written by Seth Sentry

No.	Title	Length
1.	"How Are You?"	4:03
2.	"Run"	4:22
3.	"Nobody Like Me"	2:53
4.	"Dumb"	4:17
5.	"Hell Boy"	3:24
6.	"Fake Champagne"	4:54
7.	"Rooftop Hooligans"	3:38
8.	"Hate Love"	4:18
9.	"Violin"	4:16
10.	"Pripyat (Part 1)"	1:27
11.	"Pripyat (Part 2)"	4:01
12.	"1969"	4:31
13.	"Sorry"	5:14
Total length:		51:24

== Charts ==
=== Weekly charts ===
Chart (2015)	Peak position
Australian Albums (ARIA)	2

=== Year-end charts ===
Chart (2015)	Position
Australian Albums (ARIA)	65
