= EG Awards of 2009 =

Annual Australian music awards ceremony

- Date: 20 November 2009
- Venue: Prince of Wales, Melbourne, Victoria

Highlights
- Most wins: =

The EG Awards of 2009 are the fourth Annual The Age EG (Entertainment Guide) Awards and took place at the Prince of Wales on Friday 20 November 2009.

== Hall of Fame inductees ==
Painters and Dockers

- The Painters and Dockers formed in 1982 for a one-off benefit gig to pay a friend's parking fines. They went on to develop a reputation for wild shows and the ability to play anywhere— from suburban trains for Rockin' the Rails gigs, a boat for Rockin' the Docks, a float at the Moomba Parade to the 20th floor of a building site and on a picket line. The original lineup last played more than 20 years ago, but felt that they never had proper closure on their career.

== Award nominees and winners ==
Winners indicated below in boldface

Best Album	Best Song
Paul Dempsey; The Temper Trap; Wagons	
Best Male	Best Female
Paul Dempsey; Tex Perkins; Phrase	Claire Bowditch; Sarah Blasko; Sia; Pikelet
Best Band	Best New Talent
The Temper Trap; Wagons	**Diafrix**
Best Tour	
Neil Young; Leonard Cohen; Flaming Lips	
