= Justice & Kaos =

Australian hip hop duo

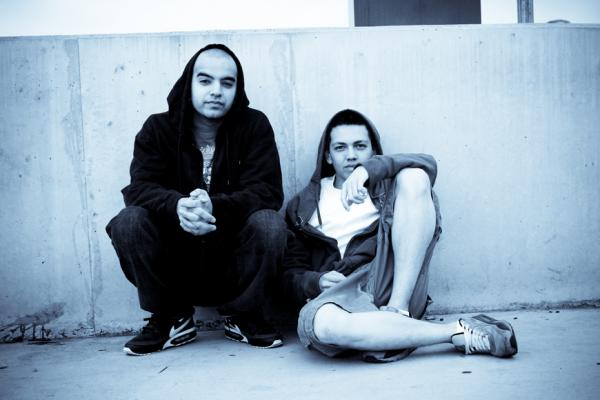

Background information
- Origin: Australia
- Genres: Hip hop
- Years active: 2003 - Present
- Label: Independent
- Members: Justice (MC), Kaos (MC/Producer)
- Website: justiceandkaos.com

Justice & Kaos are an Australian hip hop duo from Melbourne. Their debut release, the "Turn It On EP" was nominated for Best Urban Release at the 2007 ARIA Music Awards. The duo also won the "Best New Talent" at the Australian and New Zealand Urban Music Awards. Justice rose to prominence as the most prolific battle MC in Australian hiphop history, with victory at the 2004 Australian MC Battle for Supremacy and the 2005 Australia vs New Zealand MC Battle for Supremacy culminating in victory at the 2005 Scribble Jam MC Battle, making him the first non-American to do so. Justice & Kaos have supported acts such as Mobb Deep, Xzibit, Lloyd Banks, Tech N9ne, Atmosphere and Brother Ali on their respective Australian tours.

== Discography ==
=== Turn It On EP (Solid State/Warner Music 2007) ===
Track listing:

1. Our Time (Produced by Kaos)
2. Riochet (Produced by Kaos)
3. Turn It On (feat. DV alias Khryst) (Produced by Kaos)
4. Paperchase (feat. Sean Declase) (Produced by Kaos)
5. The Lineup (feat. X & Hell, GMC) (Produced by Weapon X)
6. Turn It On Remix (feat. X & Hell, Mareko, GMC, Just Enuf (Spit Syndicate), Illmac, PNC (Produced by Kaos)

=== FOB Mixtape (2007) ===
Featuring Justice & Kaos, GMC, Anonymous, DJ Simon Sez & Hung Le

=== Theme Music EP (2010) ===
Track listing:

1. Theme Music (Produced by Kaos)
2. Take My Cut (feat. Sean Declase) (Produced by Kaos)
3. Testify (Produced by Kaos)
4. This Corner (Produced by Kaos)
5. Better With You? (feat. Siki Daha) (Produced by Kaos)
6. We Walk (Produced by Kaos)

== Filmography ==
- "Fresh Off The Boat" documentary – directed by Mark Andersson & Katrina Lucas

Episode 4 in the SBS (Special Broadcasting Service) series 'mY Generation'
Selected to screen at the 12th Annual BET Urbanworld Film Festival in New York

- "Words From The City" documentary – written and directed by Natasha Gadd & Rhys Graham

Words from the City is a feature documentary exploring Australian hip hop through intimate and candid observations of some of the nation's most potent and compelling MCs.

== Other appearances ==
- Nuffsaid Presents – In case You Didn't Know – "The Takeover"
- X & Hell – Scarnon Mixtape Series
- Chopper Read – Interview with a Madman – "The Heist (feat. Anecdote & Justice)"
- Infallible – The Stratosphere – "You Better Run (feat. Anecdote, Justice & Kaos)"
- DJ Nino Brown – Blazin' 5 – "Justice Freestyle"
- GMC – Three Letter Mixtape Series
- 360 – Please Be Seated 2 mixtape ('Genesis' feat. Justice)
- Spit Syndicate – Towards the Light ('Weapon of Choice' produced by Kaos)
- Mind Over Matter – Keepin' it Breezy ('Our World' & 'Still Skinny' produced by Kaos)
