= The Waiter Minute EP =

EP by Seth Sentry
- Released: November 2008
- Producer: Matik

Seth Sentry chronology
The Waiter Minute EP (2008)	This Was Tomorrow (2012)

Singles from The Waiter Minute EP
- 1. "The Waitress Song" Released: October 2008

The Waiter Minute EP is the debut extended play by Australian musician Seth Sentry. Released in 2008, the EP was certified platinum in Australia in 2020.

== Track listing ==
1. "Simple Game"
2. "The Waitress Song"
3. "Warm Winter"
4. "Train Catcher"
5. "Strange Lot"

== Certifications ==
Region	Certification	Certified units/sales
Australia (ARIA)	Platinum	70,000^{‡}
^{‡} Sales+streaming figures based on certification alone.

== Release history ==
Region	Date	Format	Label	Catalogue
Australia	November 2008	CD; digital download		
Australia	September 2012	CD; digital download	High Score	HIGH001CD
Australia	November 2017	12" EP	High Score	HIGH001LP
