= Super Cool Tree House =

Studio album by Seth Sentry
- Released: 18 June 2021
- Genre: Hip-hop
- Label: High Score; Island Australia

Seth Sentry chronology
Strange New Past (2015)	Super Cool Tree House (2021)

Singles from Super Cool Tree House
- 1. "Castlevania" Released: 14 May 2021

Super Cool Tree House is the third studio album by Australian musician Seth Sentry, released on 18 June 2021.

The album was announced on 14 May 2021, alongside the album's lead single "Castlevania". The majority of the songs to appear on the album were made and shared with the public via his YouTube channel during COVID-19 pandemic in Australia in 2020. Sentry explained in a press statement "I asked people to send me beats, some professional producers, some amateurs and every Monday I picked a new one. Then the aim was to write and record a song that week to be released every Sunday. Not only was it a great way to kill time during the lockdown but it really helped reinvigorate my love for straight up bars. Hardly any hooks, no thought about song structure etcetera just straight up raps."

On 21 May, "Blue Shell", the second single and the opening track on the album was released.

Seth released the third single from the album, "Cheap Shots", on 28 of May.

== Track listing ==
All tracks are written by Seth Sentry.

Super Cool Tree House track listing
No.	Title	Length
1.	"Blue Shell"	3:25
2.	"Tiger King"	2:01
3.	"Cabin Fever"	2:45
4.	"Titan"	3:13
5.	"I'm Not Sad"	3:05
6.	"Cheap Shots"	3:28
7.	"Brambles"	3:08
8.	"Denial"	2:42
9.	"Castlevania"	3:15
10.	"Wingdings"	2:23
11.	"Gatorade Bong"	4:15
Total length:		33:40

== Charts ==
Chart performance for Super Cool Tree House
Chart (2021)	Peak position
Australian Albums (ARIA)	65
