= Hailey Cramer =

Hailey Cramer (born 1987) is an Australian nu-soul singer from Melbourne, Australia.

Cramer has worked with other prolific Australian and international artists, including Pez, whom she featured with on his Festival Song, 360, Gotye and supporting Blue King Brown. Cramer has also performed with Michael Franti.

In 2014 Cramer debuted her first single, Liquid Confidence, saying in an interview with Vulture Magazine that she was "... inspired by seeing the negative effects alcohol has had on some relationships in the lives of people I know." Liquid Confidence was produced by Dan West.

Cramer has also appeared on Rockwiz during the Vanda and Young tour.
