= The Meeting Tree =

Australian hip hop duo

- Origin: Australia
- Genre: Electronic
- Years active: 2015–2016
- Label: Sony
- Past members: Joyride; Raph Lauren

The Meeting Tree were an Australian electronic music duo made up of Joyride (born Rowan Dix) and Raph Lauren. Their EP R U A Cop was nominated for a 2015 ARIA Award for Best Urban Album.

After releasing their final EP in 2016, the duo created The Meeting Tree Podcast. In 2021, the duo announced a premium subscription to their podcast as well as an apparel collection featuring limited-release items.

== Band members ==
- Joyride
- Raph Lauren aka Mr Sydney

== Discography ==
- R U A Cop EP (2015) – Sony AUS #53
- Life is Long: Slow Down! EP (2015) – Sony
- I Was Born A Baby And I'll Die A Baby EP (2016) – Sony
