= Scott McFarnon =

Singer-songwriter

Scott McFarnon (born 8 August 1979) is a singer and songwriter from southeast London, England He has collaborated with some of the biggest superstars in the music business.

McFarnon's discovery by the music industry is credited to internationally renowned singer/songwriter Amanda Ghost, who encourage him to write for artists including Kelly Rowland, Mark Ronson, Daniel Merriweather, Jack Splash and Kanye West.

Scott McFarnon's collaboration with Beyoncé Knowles on the soundtrack to the 2008 film Cadillac Records brought him global attention. The track “Once in a Lifetime” was nominated for both a Golden Globe and a Grammy Award, although it ultimately lost to other songs on both occasions. Daniel Merriweather's version of McFarnon's song "Red" was released in May 2009 and became a hit in the UK, eventually reaching number five on the UK singles chart.

After signing a deal with Sony Epic in June 2009, McFarnon began work on his debut album.
