= Falling & Flying =

Studio album by 360
- Released: September 30, 2011
- Genre: Australian hip hop, electro house, dubstep, alternative hip hop
- Length: 53:52
- Label: Soulmate, EMI
- Producer: Styalz Fuego, M-Phazes

360 chronology
What You See Is What You Get (2008)	Falling & Flying (2011)	Utopia (2014)

Singles from Falling & Flying
- 1. "Just Got Started" Released: 17 December 2010; 2. "Throw It Away" Released: 22 July 2011; 3. "Killer" Released: 26 August 2011; 4. "Boys like You" Released: 21 December 2011; 5. "Hope You Don't Mind" Released: 25 February 2012; 6. "Child" Released: 23 March 2012; 7. "Run Alone" Released: 1 August 2012

Falling & Flying is the second studio album by Australian hip hop artist 360. The album was released on 30 September 2011 on Soulmate Records.

== Writing and development ==
For 360's second studio album, he worked with producers such as M-Phazes, the 2010 winner for 'Best Hip Hop Release', and Styalz Feugo. In an interview with 'All Aussie Hip Hop', he stated: "I think when I write personal and honest music that's when I shine, and that's the angle I've taken with this new album. It's all real." He also referenced the title track, stating that he loved the lyric "even when I'm falling I'm flying", and thought it effectively summed up his outlook on life.

The album was described as a cross-genre album, with dubstep, electro and pop influences. For five out of the 13 tracks, he collaborated with other artists, including Pez, Josh Pyke, Gossling and N'fa.

== Track listing ==
No.	Title	Writer(s)	Producer(s)	Length
1.	"The Take Off"	Matthew Colwell; Kaelyn Behr; Mark Landon	Styalz Fuego	4:12
2.	"I'm OK"	Colwell; Behr	Fuego	3:42
3.	"Just Got Started" (featuring Pez)	Colwell; Perry Chapman; Behr; The Whitest Boy Alive	Fuego	3:13
4.	"Throw It Away" (featuring Josh Pyke)	Colwell; Behr	Fuego	3:34
5.	"Child"	Colwell; Behr	Fuego	4:53
6.	"Boys like You" (featuring Gossling)	Colwell; Behr; Frank Jones; Jack Revens; Brad Pinto	Fuego	3:41
7.	"Killer"	Colwell; Behr; Christopher Allen; Warren Cann; William Currie; James Ure	'96 Bulls	3:50
8.	"Falling & Flying"	Colwell; Behr; Donald Addrisi; Richard Addrisi	Fuego	4:29
9.	"Run Alone"	Colwell; Behr	'96 Bulls	4:33
10.	"Hammer Head"	Colwell; Behr	Fuego	3:52
11.	"Meant to Do"	Colwell; Behr	Fuego	3:53
12.	"Miracle in a Costume" (featuring Gossling)	Colwell; Landon; Croome	M-Phazes	4:23
13.	"Hope You Don't Mind" (featuring N'fa)	Colwell; Landon	M-Phazes	5:44
Total length:				53:52

CD bonus track/iTunes clean version bonus track
No.	Title	Writer(s)	Length
14.	"Keep Me Alive" (featuring Bright Young Things)	Colwell; Behr; Dyce	3:46
Total length:			57:38

iTunes explicit version bonus track
No.	Title	Length
14.	"Broken Wings"	5:46
Total length:		59:38

Sample credits

- "Just Got Started" contains a sample of "1517" performed by The Whitest Boy Alive.
- "Killer" contains a sample from "Alles Klar" by Ultravox.
- "Falling & Flying" contains a sample from "Wendy Wakefield" performed by Bobby Whiteside, written by Don Addrisi and Rick Addrisi.

== Personnel ==
Credits for Falling & Flying adapted from liner notes.

- Styalz Fuego – producer all tracks, instruments, additional vocals
- M-Phazes – co-producer track 1, producer tracks 12 and 13, instruments
- Hailey Cramer – additional vocals, track 1
- Kaleb Tirman – additional vocals, track 2
- Pez – additional vocals, track 3
- Saraya Beric – strings, track 4
- Josh Pyke – additional vocals, track 4
- '96 Bulls – producer, tracks 7 and 9
- Brett Wood – guitar, tracks 5, 6, 7, 8, and 9
- Luke Hodgson – bass, tracks 5, 6, 7, 8, and 9
- Jason Heerah – drums, tracks 5, 6, 7, 8, and 9
- Melbourne Gospel Kids Choir – additional vocals, track 5
- Brad Pinto – acoustic guitar, track 6
- Gossling (Helen Croome) – additional vocals, tracks 6 and 12
- Sean 'Sdub' Windsor – guitar, track 7
- Damian Smith – keys, track 12
- Gideon Preiss – keys, track 13
- Jade Webster – strings, track 13
- N'fa Forster-Jones – additional vocals, track 13
- Alexis Nicole – additional vocals, track 13

== Reception ==
Professional ratings
Review scores
Source	Rating
Herald Sun	3.5/5 stars

The album was received generally well, peaking at number 4 on the Australian ARIA Albums Charts. It was certified double platinum by the Australian Recording Industry Association (ARIA) for shipments of over 140,000 copies. Cameron Adams of the Herald Sun praised 360 for "standing out from the pack" because of the emotion behind his music. Adams called it a "refreshing antidote to every egotistical rap you've endured" and compared the "flow" of his title track to that of Eminem's "Lose Yourself".

== Charts ==
=== Weekly charts ===
Chart (2012)	Peak position
Australian Albums (ARIA)	4

=== Year-end charts ===
Chart (2011)	Position
Australian Albums Chart	83
Australian Artist Albums Chart	14

Chart (2012)	Position
Australian Albums Chart	17
Australian Artist Albums Chart	5

=== Decade-end charts ===
Chart (2010–2019)	Position
Australian Albums (ARIA)	75
Australian Artist Albums (ARIA)	14

== Certifications ==
Region	Certification	Certified units/sales
Australia (ARIA)	2× Platinum	140,000^{^}
^{^} Shipments figures based on certification alone.
