= Impossible (Daniel Merriweather song) =

Single by Daniel Merriweather

from the album Love & War
- Released: August 17, 2009
- Genre: R&B; pop
- Length: 4:26
- Label: Columbia
- Songwriters: Daniel Merriweather; Mark Ronson; Dejion Madison
- Producer: Mark Ronson

Daniel Merriweather singles chronology
"Red" (2009)	"Impossible" (2009)	"Water and a Flame" (2009)

"Impossible" is the third single by Daniel Merriweather, taken from his second album Love & War. The single was released on August 17, 2009. It was produced by Mark Ronson and released under Columbia Records.

== Track list ==
Digital download bundle

1. "Impossible"
2. "Impossible" (Joey Negro Club Mix)

iTunes Digital download bundle

1. "Impossible"
2. "Impossible" (Joey Negro Club Mix)
3. "Impossible" (Sticky Remix)

== Charts ==
The song peaked at number sixty-seven on the UK Singles Chart, after the release of the digital single. It, however, reached the top 40 in Germany and number one in Greece.

Chart (2009–10)	Peak position
Germany (GfK)	39
Greece Digital Songs (Billboard)	1
Switzerland (Schweizer Hitparade)	52
UK Singles (Official Charts Company)	67
