= This Was Tomorrow =

Studio album by Seth Sentry
- Released: September 14, 2012
- Genre: Hip hop
- Length: 43:41
- Label: High Score Records

Seth Sentry chronology
The Waiter Minute EP (2008)	This Was Tomorrow (2012)	Strange New Past (2015)

Singles from This Was Tomorrow
- 1. "My Scene" Released: 24 January 2012; 2. "Float Away" Released: 4 July 2012; 3. "Dear Science" Released: January 2013

This Was Tomorrow is the debut studio album by Australian musician Seth Sentry. Released in September 2012, the album peaked at number 6 on the ARIA Charts.

At the ARIA Music Awards of 2013 the album was nominated for Best Urban Album.

At the AIR Awards of 2013, the album won Best Independent Hip Hop/Urban Album.

== Reception ==
Andrew Hickey from Beat Magazine said "This Was Tomorrow finds Melbourne rising star Seth Sentry looking at society and his place in it. The relatable rapper takes us through a typical day, introducing the listener to many of the album's running themes on opening cut 'Campfire'. On album stand-out 'My Scene' he tells outlandish yet believable tales about trying to fit into social groups." Hickey concluded saying "This Was Tomorrow is a triumph and easily one of Australia's finest hip hop releases in 2012."

Chris Yates from The Music said "This Was Tomorrow is a landmark Australian hip hop record."

== Track listing ==
All tracks are written by Seth Sentry

No.	Title	Length
1.	"Campfire"	4:05
2.	"My Scene"	4:12
3.	"Ink Blot Test"	2:56
4.	"Dear Science"	4:10
5.	"Langolier's Banquet"	4:11
6.	"Ten Paces"	3:15
7.	"Float Away"	3:14
8.	"Room for Rent"	3:19
9.	"Thanks for Your Hospitality"	4:24
10.	"Where Was You (When the Dead Come Walkin')?"	5:06
11.	"Vacation"	4:41
Total length:		43:41

== Charts ==
Chart (2012)	Peak position
Australian Albums (ARIA)	6

== Certifications ==
Region	Certification	Certified units/sales
Australia (ARIA)	Gold	35,000^{^}
^{^} Shipments figures based on certification alone.
