= Boys like You (360 song) =

Single by 360 featuring Gossling

from the album Falling & Flying
- Released: 18 November 2011
- Recorded: 2011
- Genre: Hip hop, reggae fusion, indie pop
- Length: 3:40
- Label: Soulmate Records; EMI
- Songwriters: Matthew Colwell; Kaelyn Behr; Jack Revens; Brad Pinto; Frank Jones
- Producer: Styalz Fuego

360 singles chronology
"Killer" (2012)	"Boys like You" (2011)	"Child" (2012)

Gossling singles chronology
"I Was Young" (2010)	"Boys like You" (2011)	"Wild Love" (2012)

"Boys like You" is a song recorded by Australian rapper 360 and Australian indie singer Gossling. It was released on 18 November 2011 by Soulmate Records and EMI as the fourth single from 360's second studio album, Falling & Flying (2011). The song was written by 360, Kaelyn Behr, Jack Revens, Brad Pinto and Frank Jones, and produced by Behr under his production name Styalz Fuego. "Boys like You" was a commercial success, peaking at No. 3 on the Australian Singles Chart and was eventually certified quadruple platinum by the Australian Recording Industry Association, becoming 360's most successful single to date.

The Alex Weltlinge directed music video was nominated for Best Video at the ARIA Music Awards of 2012.

== Background and development ==
During an interview with MTV Australia, when asked how inspiration came from the track, 360 stated: "I find I write my best stuff when I write from personal experience or something like that, just anything that I feel like I need to get off my chest. That's the stuff that comes out the fastest [....] songs like 'Boys like You' were all written amazingly fast. It just comes out."

== Chart performance ==
"Boys like You" made its first chart appearance in Australia on 4 December 2011, at No. 47. On 22 January 2012, the song re-entered the chart at No. 35. Four weeks later, it reached a peak of No. 3, a position it held for three consecutive weeks. "Boys like You" has since been certified 4× Platinum by the Australian Recording Industry Association, denoting shipments of 280,000 copies. The song entered the New Zealand Singles Chart at No. 36 on 12 March 2012. The following week, "Boys like You" reached, No. 33, a peak position it held for two non-consecutive weeks.

== Charts and certifications ==
=== Weekly charts ===
Chart (2012)	Peak position
Australia (ARIA)	3
New Zealand (Recorded Music NZ)	33

=== Year-end charts ===
Chart (2012)	Position
Australia (ARIA)	23

=== Certifications ===
Region	Certification	Certified units/sales
Australia (ARIA)	4× Platinum	280,000^{^}
^{^} Shipments figures based on certification alone.
