= Red (Daniel Merriweather song) =

2009 single by Daniel Merriweather

Single by Daniel Merriweather

from the album Love & War
- Released: 18 May 2009
- Genre: Soul
- Length: 3:53
- Label: Columbia
- Songwriter: Scott McFarnon
- Producer: Mark Ronson

Daniel Merriweather singles chronology
"Change" (2009)	"Red" (2009)	"Impossible" (2009)

"Red" is the second single released by Daniel Merriweather from his second album, Love & War. The single was released on 18 May 2009. Written by British songwriter Scott McFarnon, it was produced by Mark Ronson, like the rest of the songs on this album. It was released on the Columbia record label.

== Content ==
Merriweather said that this song "is about the blindness of war and the absence of compassion displayed by western administrations. And Communism, specifically communism in Romania. Mainly about Vatra Dornei region."

== Music video ==
The video for the song was shot in Brooklyn, New York and was directed by Anthony Mandler.

The video is made up mostly of scenes showing Merriweather and his on-screen girlfriend in a dark apartment. The video shows the emotional strain that is taking its toll on their relationship. It shows their anger and frustration with each other. Merriweather is also seen sitting alone in the corner of a dark room as images are projected over the wall behind him. The images depict bullets shooting through glass as well as fire. These scenes are interspersed with shots of Merriweather in a dark, abandoned warehouse. He is also seen walking the streets of Brooklyn. Though the overall colour palette of the video is quite dark and dreary, hints of red are used throughout the video in the clothing Merriweather wears, the lighting in one of the rooms, as well as some of the images projected on the wall.

The video was released on 15 April 2009 on Merriweather's YouTube account. As of 28 May 2009, this upload had received about 410,427 views and a 5-star rating from over 748 viewers.

== Critical reception ==
"Red" received mixed reviews from music critics:

Digital Spy gave the song 3 out of 5 stars saying that "Sadly this press release description of Daniel Merriweather's latest single is much like the singer himself - intriguing on paper, but lacking in excitement when you actually sample the goods". They also said that "but there's something rather cold and clinical about the Australian's performance. He may list Stax and Motown as influences, but the 26-year-old doesn't transfer the fire and thrills of his heroes into his own melodic flow".

The Beat Review gave the song 4 out of 5 stars saying that "It’s an emotional track that catches every emotion of everybody who hears it. It’s somehow about being “perfect” as Daniel sings, “It took something perfect, to paint it red”. Along with the impressive arrangement, Daniel’s soulful, raspy vocals ventures into the whole track making it one of his finest".

Chart Blog gave the song 3 out of 5 stars saying "I can't tell if it's the quiet, uncharismatic way he has about him or the song's melodic weak spots which is the problem - for all that the chorus is great, there's a bridge which doesn't really work - but somehow this isn't an easy song to get excited about".

== Track list ==
1. "Red"
2. "You Don't Know What Love Is (You Just Do As You're Told)"

== Release history ==
Country	Release date	Format	Label
United Kingdom	18 May 2009	CD single, digital download	RCA Label Group (UK)

== Charts ==
The song entered the UK Singles Chart at number 5, making it his second top ten hit as the lead vocalist. It stayed in that position for a second, third and fourth week. The song entered the Irish Singles Chart at number 36, marking it the first Merriweather song, with him as a lead vocalist, to chart in the country. It eventually peaked at number 9, becoming his first top ten hit on the Irish Charts. The song also became popular in Denmark, spending 16 weeks on the chart and peaking at number 5.

== Charts and certifications ==
=== Weekly charts ===
Chart (2009)	Peak position
Australia (ARIA)	65
Denmark (Tracklisten)	5
Ireland (IRMA)	9
Scotland Singles (OCC)	8
UK Singles (OCC)	5

=== Year-end charts ===
Chart (2009)	Position
UK Singles Chart	36

=== Certifications ===
Region	Certification	Certified units/sales
Denmark (IFPI Danmark)	Gold	15,000^{^}
United Kingdom (BPI)	Platinum	600,000^{‡}
^{^} Shipments figures based on certification alone.^{‡} Sales+streaming figures based on certification alone.

== B-side: "You Don't Know What Love Is (You Just Do As You're Told)" ==
The B-side song entered the UK Singles Chart at number 126, without any promotion except from being the "Red" B-side. It was the first B-side by Merriweather to chart.

Chart (2009)	Peak position
UK Singles Chart	126
