= 360 (rapper) =

Australian hip hop artist (born 1986)

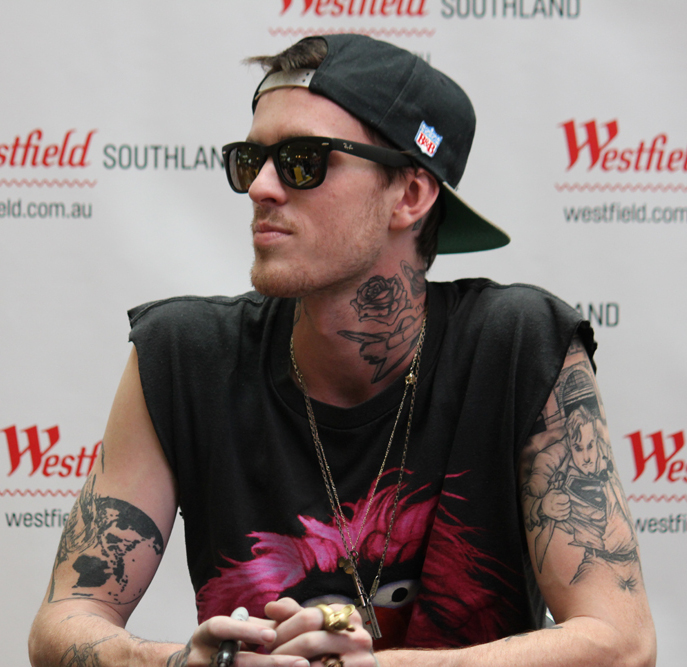
- 360 at his Falling & Flying CD Signing, Cheltenham in February 2012

Background information
- Born: Matthew James Colwell; 12 July 1986 (age 40); Melbourne, Victoria, Australia
- Genre: Hip hop
- Occupations: Rapper; singer; songwriter
- Years active: 2006–present
- Labels: Inertia, EMI Music Australia, Soulmate, Forthwrite
- Website: 360music.com.au

Matthew James Colwell (born 12 July 1986), better known by his stage name 360, is an Australian hip hop recording artist. He has released five studio albums: What You See Is What You Get (2008); Falling & Flying (2011), which peaked at No. 4 on the ARIA Albums Chart and was certified platinum; Utopia (2014), Vintage Modern (2017), and Out Of The Blue (2025). 360's second album provided four charting singles, including "Boys like You", which peaked at No. 3 on the ARIA Singles Chart and was certified 4× platinum. At the ARIA Music Awards of 2012, he received six nominations and won the 'Breakthrough Artist – Release' award for Falling & Flying, while Styalz Fuego won the ARIA 'Producer of the Year' Artisan award for the same album.

== Early life ==
360 was born on 12 July 1986. He attended Luther College in Melbourne's eastern suburbs and graduated from Box Hill Senior Secondary College.

== Music ==
=== 2003–2006: Early career ===
360 made his first official appearance in 2003 on fellow Australian rapper Infallible's EP A Burning Ambition, on the track "Situation Critical" along with MCs Hunter and Versa. The following year, he released his debut solo EP, titled Rarities, in which three of its four tracks featured his rap partner and best friend Pez.

In 2005, Pez and 360 released a song called "Nutcase", which 360 described as a "fuck around track [that was] written and recorded in one day. Trying to make you laugh, or cringe". 360 was featured on Sydney producers X & Hell's 2006 mixtape Scar-Non III: Kick To The Head with the song "In Da Chub", a remix of 50 Cent's 2003 hit "In Da Club".

=== 2007–2012: What You See Is What You Get, Falling & Flying ===
In February 2007, he signed to Soulmate Records. He released his debut album, What You See Is What You Get, on 22 March 2008. An InTheMix reviewer found 360 "not only showcases his hilariously funny comedic side but demonstrates his ability to approach more serious and personal issues, producing a well rounded album".

In a video interview for Peak Street Magazine, 360 described his musical style as a combination of "some pop influences, electro, dubstep, and unintelligent rhymes". On 14 January 2008, 360 released a music video of "Mamma Mia", which depicts his desire for Bec Hewitt and mocked her husband, Lleyton Hewitt, which was the Video of the Week on MySpace.com's Australian hip hop page. 360 described it as a comedic effort, "I wanted to take the piss out of them ... It's not meant to be taken too seriously she's not really my type". Management for the couple dismissed the rapper's effort as "a publicity stunt".

By March 2010, he remained signed with Soulmate Records, which had signed a distribution deal with EMI Records. In December that year, his single, "Just Got Started" (featuring Pez), was released. By March the following year, it peaked at No. 59 on the ARIA Singles Chart, and at No. 21 on the ARIA Urban Singles Chart.

360's second album, Falling & Flying, was released on 30 September 2011 which reached No. 4 on the ARIA Albums Chart, and remained in the number-one position of the Australian iTunes charts for three weeks. By October 2012, Falling & Flying was certified platinum by ARIA for shipments of 70,000 units, and was certified double platinum by July 2014.

In November 2011, the fourth single from the album, "Boys like You" (featuring Gossling), was released, which peaked at No. 3 on the Australian singles chart in February 2012. The track also reached the top 40 of the New Zealand Singles Chart. The single was certified 4× platinum by ARIA for shipments of 280,000 units. His following singles, "Child" (April 2012) and "Run Alone" (August), both reached the ARIA 'Singles Top 30' chart. "Child" was certified platinum and "Run Alone" received a gold certification.

The national Australian "Flying Tour" occurred in support of the album, and 360 was supported by Melbourne artist Bam Bam.

=== 2012–2014: Utopia ===
In June 2012, 360 revealed to national youth broadcaster Triple J that he was already working on his third album, describing the upcoming release as "quite a dark album". He described it further, "No one sees behind the scenes and there's been a lot of bad (expletive) going on in my family life and personal life". 360 hinted at a diverse production line-up for the album, saying he has "been getting a gang of beats from all different people".

A video, published on 21 November 2013, served as the official press release for the launch of Forthwrite Records, a music label created by 360 and Pez. 360 then confirmed the announcement on his Facebook page the following day, stating that the label will release Don't Look Down, by Pez, Utopia, by 360, and the debut, yet untitled Forthwrite album.

During his performance at the 2013 Sprung Hip Hop Festival, held in Brisbane, Australia, 360 garnered media attention for the manner in which he introduced a new song titled "On A Planet No One Knows". According to 360, the song, which also features a vocal sample from Joss Whedon regarding gender equality, is "about racism in Australia." 360 exclaimed:

There's a lot of racist cunts in this country [Australia]. I don't know if people are proud to admit it, or what—but there is. No matter what colour or background we are, there are fuckheads in every single race. Generalising everyone is fucking ignorant and uneducated and stupid. If you're offended by this then you're probably fuckin' racist and you should fuck off.

In February 2014, 360 supported the Australian tour of American rapper Eminem, alongside Kendrick Lamar. 360 described the tour as a career highlight and explained to the media in January 2014 that it would be his first tour sober—he had previously struggled with drug addiction.

Prior to the release of the artist's third album, Utopia, on 13 June 2014, three singles were released: "Impossible", "On A Planet No One Knows" and "Sixavelli". "Impossible" is a collaboration with Daniel Johns, of Australian band Silverchair, and Johns also appears in the music video, in which he is a passenger in a car driven by 360. A music video was also released for the second single and was published on the artist's YouTube channel during the week before Australia Day. The music video for "Sixavelli" was directed by Claudia Sangiorgi Dalimore and was published in March 2014.

Alongside fellow Australian hip hop act Hilltop Hoods, 360 performed at the 2014 Splendour In The Grass festival, held in Byron Bay, Australia. The Australian "Utopia Tour" occurred during September 2014 and 360 was supported by US rapper Hopsin, UK artist Lunar C, Pez and Miracle.

=== 2015-2021: Vintage Modern ===
In January 2015, the Utopia Tour was abruptly cancelled due to 'unexpected illness'. He rescheduled the tour and renamed it the "Retopia Tour". On 9 January 2016, 360 posted a video on Facebook titled "I'm Sorry" with the caption "exactly 1 year ago [I] was on tour, something happened and [I] had to cancel the rest of the tour. This is what happened...". In the video, 360 raps about how he was found "convulsing on the floor" during the Utopia Tour and "woke up in hospital going through withdrawals". The video has been viewed more than 13 million times. On February 22, 360 released Please Be Seated 3, a free downloadable mixtape which featured the track "I'm Sorry". A track from the mixtape, "My Favourite Downfall", was released as a single.

On 6 June 2017, 360 released the single "God Mode", the first of six tracks to be released biweekly in a series called VI. The last track from the VI series, "Tiny Angel", tells the story of a stillborn child. 360 spoke about the track via his website, saying the song "was inspired by one of my friends and his partner who tragically lost their baby to stillbirth, and seeing the inevitable impact it had on them for such a long time after. It fucked him up to the point where he came extremely close to taking his life. It’s something that nobody should ever have to experience." The track was included on his fourth studio album Vintage Modern.

On 22 September 2017, the single "Yesterday" was released and the track list for Vintage Modern was announced. The album was released on 27 October and featured the subsequently released singles "Way Out" and "Drugs".

=== 2022–present: Out of the Blue ===
In January 2023, 360 released "Made Me Like This", his first release under new management company Lucky Ent and Teamwrk Records. In the same year, he released "Knowing My Place", a collaboration with Australian DJ Joel Fletcher, "The Truman Show", "Lose It", "Hardly Talk" and "Most Wanted Freestyle", all of which were released as standalone singles.

On 17 January 2025, 360 released "Back to You", the first single from his long awaited fifth studio album Out of the Blue. The album was released on 11 July.

== Collaborations ==
During the early years of his music career, 360 collaborated frequently with Pez as part of a duo called Forthwrite, including a track called "The Club Song" on the 2010 album Good Gracious, by producer M-Phazes. 360 also featured on Pez's 2008 single, "The Festival Song", which peaked at No. 14 on the ARIA Australian singles chart.

In 2010, 360 started an online musical project in the Australian hip hop scene, called Rapper Tag, on YouTube. Rapper Tag involved one person recording a portion of rap over a looped beat, and then nominating ("tagging") another person to add further rapping over the same loop. The process continued in accordance with the nomination of the next rapper.

Australian hip hop duo Diafrix collaborated with 360 on the song "I'm a Dreamer", which appears on the 2012 album Pocket Full of Dreams. 360 appeared on the self-titled debut album by Canberra producer Ghosts in the Room, released on 14 September 2012 through Mudd Music. The album also features rappers Iron Solomon, Okwerdz and Kool G Rap.

== Media appearances ==
360 was a panel member for the 20 October 2014 edition of the Australian Broadcasting Corporation (ABC) program Q&A. He appeared alongside Brian Cox, a particle physicist, Richard Gill, renowned conductor, and Nalini Joshi, a notable Australian mathematician, to discuss the topic of "passion". 360 garnered media attention for his comments on the television program regarding racism in relation to Australia, Australian hip hop and the Australian flag. When questioned by the presenter, 360 replied:

On Australia Day, you see dudes walking around with their tops off, and they're getting on the drink and all that. And they've got an Australian flag wrapped around their neck. I've seen it so many times; like, I've been in a taxi where we've pulled up because these dickheads have been walking across the road—they just start yelling at the taxi driver, like: "Get out of the country! This is not your country!" ... And they're wearing Australian flags. I've seen it so much, like, growing up ... still today, you know what I mean?

This response caused controversy, including the transference of the media spotlight onto Pez, who made comments on social media following 360's appearance. In addition to a message of support for his friend and musical collaborator, Pez also wrote that he also "got a bit offended"; however, he subsequently removed the sentence "To be honest, even I got a bit offended." from his original Facebook post. As of 24 October 2014, 360 had not retracted his Q&A comments and explained after the airing of the episode: "If you are not racist then you have nothing to be offended about."

== Personal life ==
360 was diagnosed with keratoconus, a rare degenerative eye disease which led him to having a cornea transplant in one eye. His vision is still not great and he can't drive at night or see the lines or read signs properly.

On 18 July 2010, 360 was involved in a go-karting accident while celebrating his birthday with Sydney-based hip hop artists Bliss n Eso. His accident resulted in a torn artery, lacerated pancreas and a damaged scrotum. According to the rapper, "It [scrotum] wasn't ruptured, but it was ripped open ... The first thing I checked once I woke up was I didn't need to use a colostomy bag. My sex life is intact. There's no sex appeal if you use a colostomy bag".

On 13 February 2012, 360 and Crystal Bale became engaged; the pair then separated on 24 December 2012.

As of October 2014, 360 is listed as a supporter of the 'Oscar's Law' campaign, which seeks to raise public awareness about the detrimental effects of factory farming of companion animals. He also appeared in PETA's 'Ink not Mink' anti-fur campaign.

360 and Bale promoted awareness of suicide and depression issues. In mid-February 2012, he posted a video clip with the following statement: "I don't usually drop serious videos, but this is something I'm passionate about spreading awareness about. Even if you hate me, this has nothing to do with music—please share this around so as many people as possible can see it". In September 2012, Bale posted her video, 'A Message from Crystal', which Beats Factory's Robyn Morrison described as footage of Bale "talking about how she has been affected by suicide—multiple times ... [it] is sometimes hard to watch, but essential viewing".

On 8 January 2016, 360 posted a song named "I'm Sorry" to his Facebook page, which addressed his codeine addiction and subsequent overdose. His addiction resulted in him cancelling tours without notice. In the song 360 mentions how he didn't tell anyone because he felt like a burden. Because he was addicted to Nurofen Plus, the pills could be bought without a prescription.

In September 2016, 360 announced that he was diagnosed with unipolar depression.

As of 2021, 360 frequently livestreams himself writing rap lyrics as well as performing new material live for his fans. 360 also revived an old Australian hip-hop trend of "rapper tag" (which he started), encouraging fellow Australian rappers to participate in the rap challenge. He also continues to promote his message of healthy living and mental health awareness through his livestreams.

== Discography ==
=== Studio albums ===
Title	Album details	Peak chart positions		Certifications
Title	Album details	AUS	NZ	Certifications
What You See Is What You Get	Released: 22 March 2008; Label: Inertia; Formats: CD, digital download	—	—	
Falling & Flying	Released: 30 September 2011; Label: Soulmate, EMI; Formats: CD, digital download, LP	4	—	ARIA: 2× Platinum
Utopia	Released: 13 June 2014; Label: Forthwrite, EMI; Formats: CD, digital download, LP	2	27	ARIA: Gold
Vintage Modern	Released: 27 October 2017; Label: Forthwrite, EMI; Formats: CD, digital download	3	— (Note: Vintage Modern did not enter the NZ Top 40 Albums Chart, but peaked at number three on the NZ Heatseekers Albums Chart.)	
Out of the Blue	Released: 11 July 2025; Formats: CD, digital download	—	—	
"—" denotes a recording that did not chart or was not released in that territory.

=== Singles ===
Title	Year	Peak chart positions		Certifications	Album
Title	Year	AUS	NZ	Certifications	Album
"Just Got Started" (featuring Pez)	2010	59	—	ARIA: Gold	Falling & Flying
"Throw It Away" (featuring Josh Pyke)	2011	79	—		Falling & Flying
"Killer"	2011	87	—		Falling & Flying
"Boys like You" (featuring Gossling)	2011	3	33	ARIA: 4× Platinum	Falling & Flying
"Child"	2012	24	—	ARIA: Platinum	Falling & Flying
"Run Alone"	2012	24	—	ARIA: Platinum	Falling & Flying
"Impossible" (Note: "Impossible" was originally released as a stand-alone single on 17 January 2014 and appears as a bonus track on the Deluxe edition of Utopia.) (featuring Daniel Johns)	2014	25	—		Utopia
"Sixavelli" (featuring Lunar C)	2014	76	—		Utopia
"Live It Up" (featuring Pez)	2014	21	—	ARIA: Platinum	Utopia
"Price of Fame" (featuring Gossling)	2014	19	—	ARIA: Platinum	Utopia
"My Favourite Downfall" (Note: "My Favourite Downfall" was the fifth track on 360's 2016 mixtape Please Be Seated 3 and was released on iTunes as a stand alone single)	2016	70	—		Non-album single
"Yesterday" (featuring Hein Cooper)	2017	88	—		Vintage Modern
"Way Out" (featuring Teischa)	2017	95	—		Vintage Modern
"Drugs"	2018	—	—		Vintage Modern
"Made Me Like This" (featuring Gosling)	2023	—	—		TBA
"Knowing My Place" (with Joel Fletcher)	2023	—	—		TBA
"The Truman Show"	2023	—	—		TBA
"Lose It"(featuring Ally Rendall)	2023	—	—		TBA
"Save My Soul"	2025	—	—		Out of the Blue
"Coastline"	2025	—	—		Out of the Blue
"Been Through Hell"	2025	—	—		Out of the Blue
"Sodom and Gomorrah"	2025	—	—		Out of the Blue
"Someone Else'e Dime"(with Conrad Sewell)	2025	—	—		Out of the Blue
"—" denotes a recording that did not chart or was not released in that territory.

=== Promotional singles ===
Title	Year	Album
"God Mode"	2017	Vintage Modern
"Devil's Advocate"	2017	Vintage Modern
"Just a Thought"	2017	Vintage Modern
"Dem Gainz" (featuring Pez)	2017	Vintage Modern
"Floorless" (featuring Travy P)	2017	Vintage Modern
"Tiny Angel"	2017	Vintage Modern

== Awards and nominations ==
=== AIR Awards ===
The Australian Independent Record Awards (commonly known informally as AIR Awards) is an annual awards night to recognise, promote and celebrate the success of Australia's Independent Music sector.

Year	Nominee / work	Award	Result
2011	360	Jägermeister Most Hunted Award (Most Popular as voted by fans)	Won
2012	360	Best Independent Artist	Nominated
2012	Falling & Flying	Best Independent Hip Hop Album	Won
2012	Falling & Flying	Best Independent Album	Nominated
2012	"Boys Like You"	Best Independent Single	Nominated

=== APRA Awards ===
The APRA Awards are presented annually from 1982 by the Australasian Performing Right Association (APRA), "honouring composers and songwriters".

Year	Nominee / work	Award	Result	Ref.
2013	360, Styalz Fuego	Breakthrough Songwriter of the Year	Won	
2013	"Boys Like You" – 360 featuring Gossling (Kaelyn Behr, Matthew Colwell, Francis Jones, Bradford Pinto, Jack Revens)	Most Played Australian Song of the Year	Nominated	
2013	"Boys Like You" – 360 featuring Gossling (Kaelyn Behr, Matthew Colwell, Francis Jones, Bradford Pinto, Jack Revens)	Urban Work of the Year	Nominated	
2013	"Boys Like You" – 360 featuring Gossling (Kaelyn Behr, Matthew Colwell, Francis Jones, Bradford Pinto, Jack Revens)	Song of the Year	Shortlisted	
2013	"Child" (Kaelyn Behr, Matthew Colwell)	Urban Work of the Year	Nominated	
2013	"Child" (Kaelyn Behr, Matthew Colwell)	Song of the Year	Shortlisted	
2014	"Run Alone" (Kaelyn Behr, Matthew Colwell)	Urban Work of the Year	Nominated	
2018	"Yesterday" (featuring Hein Cooper) (Kaelyn Behr, Matthew Colwell, Martin Nicholas, Hein Cooper)	Song of the Year	Shortlisted	

=== ARIA Awards ===
At the ARIA Music Awards of 2012, 360 was nominated in six categories and won the 'ARIA Award for Breakthrough Artist - Release' for Falling & Flying, while Feugo won the 'Producer of the Year' in the Artisan section.

Year	Nominee / work	Award	Result
2012	Falling & Flying	Album of the Year	Nominated
2012	Falling & Flying	Best Urban Album	Nominated
2012	Falling & Flying	Breakthrough Artist – Release	Won
2012	Falling & Flying – 360	Best Male Artist	Nominated
2012	Falling & Flying – Styalz Fuego	Producer of the Year	Won
2012	Falling & Flying – Scott Horscroft, Phillip Threlfall	Engineer of the Year	Nominated
2012	Falling & Flying – Debaser	Best Cover Art	Nominated
2012	"Boys like You" (featuring Gossling)	Song of the Year	Nominated
2012	"Boys like You" (featuring Gossling) – Alex Weltlinger	Best Video	Nominated
2012	The Flying Tour	Best Australian Live Act	Nominated
2014	Utopia	Best Urban Album	Nominated
2014	Utopia	Best Cover Art	Nominated
2018	Vintage Modern	Best Urban Release	Nominated

=== EG Awards / Music Victoria Awards ===
The EG Awards (known as Music Victoria Awards since 2013) are an annual awards night celebrating Victorian music. They commenced in 2006.

Year	Nominee / work	Award	Result
2012	360	Best Male	Nominated
