= Lowrider (Australian band) =

- Also known as: LWRDR, Wearelowrider, LOWRIDER
- Origin: Adelaide, Australia
- Genres: Soul; indie; pop
- Years active: 2003—2014
- Labels: Illusive Sounds
- Members: Joseph Braithwaite; Scott Duncan; John Bartlett; Paul Bartlett

Lowrider was an Australian soul-indie band, formed in 2003 when brothers John (keyboard and Rhodes) and Paul Bartlett (drums) joined with bassist Scott Duncan and singer Joseph Braithwaite. Lowrider draws influences from Donny Hathaway, Marvin Gaye, Curtis Mayfield, the Roots, Mos Def and Erykah Badu. After 10 years of performing, they called it quits in August of 2014 and performed their last show in November of that year.

== History ==
Lowrider released their self-titled debut album on Illusive Sounds in 2006.

They released their second album Diamond Amongst the Thieves in March 2008. The album's singles "Be Bad" and "Friend" received airplay on Australian radio stations.

During 2008–2009, Lowrider toured with Australian hip hop act Hilltop Hoods at the Big Day Out Music Festival and played at Byron Bay's East Coast Blues & Roots Music Festival.

Lowrider released Round the World in July 2010. The album peaked at number 87 on the ARIA Charts. At the ARIA Music Awards of 2010, Round the World was nominated for Best Urban Album. Lowrider toured with international artists including Lionel Richie and John Legend during 2011.

In 2012, the band headed to the US for performances in Los Angeles for the Aussie BBQ and at Austin's South by Southwest SXSW festival.

In February 2013, the band released their fourth album, Black Stones. The album was recorded throughout 2012 between the famed Red Bull Studios in Los Angeles California, and Chapel Lane Studios in Adelaide, South Australia. The album was preceded by the singles "Days of Boredom" and "And I Wonder" with singles "Golden Sun" and "In My Arms" following.

In August of 2014, they announced the band would split up on an indefinite hiatus, performing one final show beforehand. The show was played in their hometown of Adelaide at the HQ Complex on November 21.

== Discography ==
=== Studio albums ===
List of studio albums, with selected chart positions
Title	Album details	Peak chart positions
Title	Album details	AUS
Lowrider	Released: 2006; Label: Illusive Sounds (LIBCD9248.2); Format: CD	-
Diamond Amongst the Thieves	Released: March 2008; Label: Illusive Sounds (ILL003CD); Format: CD, DD	-
Round the World	Released: July 2010; Label: Illusive Sounds (ILL033CD); Format: CD, DD	87
Black Stones	Released: 2012; Label: Illusive Sounds (ILL082CD); Format: CD, DD	-

== Awards and nominations ==
=== AIR Awards ===
The Australian Independent Record Awards (commonly known informally as AIR Awards) is an annual awards night to recognise, promote and celebrate the success of Australia's Independent Music sector.

Year	Nominee / work	Award	Result
2010	Round the World	Best Independent Hip Hop/Urban Album	Nominated

=== ARIA Music Awards ===
The ARIA Music Awards is an annual awards ceremony that recognises excellence, innovation, and achievement across all genres of Australian music.

Year	Nominee / work	Award	Result
2010	Round the World	Best Urban Album	Nominated
