= Diafrix =

Australian musicians

- Origin: Melbourne, Australia
- Genres: Hip hop; soul; reggae; dancehall; funk
- Years active: 2001–present
- Label: Illusive Sounds
- Members: Momo; Azmarino

Diafrix are an Australian hip hop duo, Azmarino (Khaled Abdulwahab) and Momo (Mohammed Komba), which formed in 2001. Their music mixes funk, soul, reggae and dancehall.

At the EG Awards of 2009, they won Best New Talent.

== Biography ==
Azmarino (Khaled Abdulwahab) met Momo (Mohammed Komba) in the Melbourne suburb of Footscray in 2001 at a hip-hop clinic for school students held at a community art centre, hosted by Joelistics from TZU. Azmarino was born in Eritrea and Momo was born in the Comoros Islands. Joelistics suggested the pair work together, so they formed Diafrix.

Diafrix has opened for such acts as Bliss n Eso, as well as international acts such as Macklemore and Ryan Lewis. Their song "Running It" was adopted as the official theme tune for the Western Bulldogs for 2013. Their music has been referred to as "anthemic" for the multicultural area they grew up in.

Specific influences on their music are diverse, ranging from Nas to Bob Marley to Fat Freddy’s Drop.

== Discography ==
=== Albums ===
List of albums, with Australian chart positions
Title	Album details	Peak chart positions
Title	Album details	AUS
In Tha Place	Released: 13 November 2006; Format: CD; Label: MGM Distribution (DIAFRIX02)	-
Concrete Jungle	Released: 3 August 2009; Format: CD; Label: Illusive Sounds/Universal Music Australia (ILL028CD)	-
Pocket Full of Dreams	Released: 24 September 2012; Format: CD; Label: Illusive Sounds/Universal Music Australia (ILL072CD)	98

=== Extended plays ===
- The First Sample (2005)
- Second Sample (2015)

=== Singles ===
- "Let's Go" (2009)
- "Simple Man" featuring Daniel Merriweather (2011) – Illusive Sounds/Universal Music Australia (ILL048CD) AUS Hitseekers: No. 7
- "Running It" (2012)
- "Easy Come, Easy Go" (2012)
- "I'm a Dreamer" featuring 360 (2012) – Illusive Sounds/Universal Music Australia (AU-LI0-12-84120) AUS Urban: No. 31
- "Radio" (2013) – Illusive Sounds/Universal Music Australia (AU-LI0-12-84150) AUS Urban: No. 13, AUS Hitseekers: No. 13
- "Rest Assured" (2013)
- "The Sign" (2014)

== Awards ==
=== EG Awards / Music Victoria Awards ===
The EG Awards (known as Music Victoria Awards since 2013) are an annual awards night celebrating Victorian music. They commenced in 2006.

Year	Nominee / work	Award	Result
2009	Diafrix	Best New Talent	Won
