= Change (Daniel Merriweather song) =

Single by Daniel Merriweather featuring Wale

from the album Love & War
- Released: 2 February 2009 (UK); 30 January 2009 (US & CA)
- Genre: R&B; pop; alternative hip hop
- Length: 3:24 (w/Wale); 3:04 (solo edit)
- Label: Columbia (UK), Marlin (AUS)
- Songwriters: Daniel Merriweather; Andrew Wyatt
- Producer: Mark Ronson

Daniel Merriweather singles chronology
| "Cash in My Pocket" (2008) | "Change" (2009) | "Red" (2009) |

Wale singles chronology
| "Nike Boots" (2007) | "Change" (2009) | "Chillin" (2009) |

"Change" is a song by Australian singer/songwriter Daniel Merriweather featuring a rap verse from American rapper Wale. It was written by Merriweather and Andrew Wyatt and produced by Mark Ronson. It was released on 30 January 2009 in the United States and Canada, and 2 February 2009 in the UK (where the song peaked at no.8).

The song is included on Merriweather's album Love & War. The music video was directed by Elliot Jokelson.

Daniel Merriweather performed this song on the Seven Network's Sunrise on the morning of 26 June 2009; just after this performance news of Michael Jackson's death was broken.

== Reviews ==
Digital Spy gave the song 3/5 stars saying that "Lead single 'Change' is a typically snazzy Ronson production — there are horns and lightly funky beats as you'd expect".

Angryape.com had this to say about the song "newcomer Daniel Merriweather is already well on his way to a top 10 hit before this single has even touched radio airwaves. Perhaps best known as the "voice" on Ronson's 2007 hit 'Stop Me' or Wiley's Cash in My Pocket,".

Thebeatreview.com gave the song 5/5 stars saying that it was "a pretty decent R&B song filled with stumping basses, satisfying drums and incorporated with some piano and saxophone/trumpet/horn. It's funky, soulful yet proving to be very catchy".

The Daily Music Guide gave the song 3/5, commenting that the "results possibly aren't as mind-blowing as perhaps the PR says on the tin" but is "a decent enough pop song".

== CD single track listing ==
1. "Change"
2. "I Think I'm in Love"

== Charts ==
=== Weekly charts ===
Weekly chart performance for "Change"
| Chart (2009) | Peak position |
|---|---|
| Australia (ARIA) | 41 |
| Austria (Ö3 Austria Top 40) | 11 |
| Belgium (Ultratip Bubbling Under Flanders) | 16 |
| Germany (GfK) | 13 |
| Netherlands (Dutch Top 40) | 31 |
| Netherlands (Single Top 100) | 71 |
| Switzerland (Schweizer Hitparade) | 6 |
| UK Singles (OCC) | 8 |

=== Year-end charts ===
Year-end chart performance for "Change"
| Chart (2009) | Position |
|---|---|
| Swiss Singles Chart | 80 |
