= X & Hell =

Australian musical group

- Also known as: Weapon X & Ken Hell
- Origin: Melbourne, Victoria, Australia
- Genres: Electro-rap
- Years active: 2004–2009
- Labels: Solid State/Illusive; Universal
- Past members: Ken Hell (a.k.a. Daivin Verduci); Weapon X (a.k.a. Xavier Millis); A-Style

X & Hell or Weapon X & Ken Hell are an Australian electro-rap group, consisting of producer and vocalist, Weapon X (a.k.a. Xavier Millis), vocalist, Ken Hell (a.k.a. Daivin Verduci) and DJ and turntablist, A-Style. They issued two albums, Sneakerpimpin Aint Easy (2005) and Million Dollar Sex Party (2008). They were nominated for Best Urban Release in 2005 for "Otherman" and in 2006 for Sneakerpimpin Aint Easy. "Otherman" (July 2005), their debut single, reached No. 46 on the ARIA Singles Chart.

== History ==
In 2005 X & Hell, as Weapon X & Ken Hell, released their debut album, Sneakerpimpin Aint Easy. The group were signed to Melbourne record label Illusive Sounds, part of the Mushroom Records. The label is home to Australian acts Bliss n Eso, Solid MC, Paris Wells, Lowrider, and the Winnie Coopers. Their album provided three singles, "Otherman" (July 2005), "Sneakerpimpin Aint Easy" (2006) and "Stares and Whispers 05" – the latter is a cover version featuring its original singer, Renée Geyer. "Otherman", which peaked at No. 46 on the ARIA Singles Chart, received steady airplay on commercial radio and was the Channel [V]'s Ripe Clip of the Week.

Both "Otherman" and the album Sneakerpimpin Aint Easy were nominated for Best Urban Release at the ARIA Music Awards of 2005 and 2006, respectively. The album earned them Australian tour support slots with 50 Cent and G-Unit, Mobb Deep and Xzibit in 2005 and 2006. X & Hell also issued a three-part, mixtape series, Scar-non.

In 2007 they released a video for "Drive It Like It's Hot", performed by Ken Hell's alter ego Take it Easy Heezy, as a parody based on Snoop Dogg's hit, "Drop It Like Its Hot". Also in that year DJ A-Style won the Victorian leg of the DMC Championships. In July 2008 X & Hell released the first single, "Don't Stop Movin", from its second album, Million Dollar Sex Party, to radio and press. It was produced by Weapon X and Styalz Fuego.

By 2010 Millis, on keyboards, had formed an AOR group, White Widdow, with his brother Jules Millis (a.k.a. Julez Mephisto) on lead vocals, Enzo Almanzi on lead guitar, Jim Naish on drums and Trent Wilson on bass guitar.

== Members ==
- Weapon X (a.k.a. Xavier Millis) – producer, vocals, songwriting
- Ken Hell (a.k.a. Daivin Verduci) – vocals, songwriting
- A-Style – DJ, turntabling

== Discography ==
=== Albums ===
List of albums, with selected details
Title	Details
Sneakerpimpin Aint Easy	Released: 2005; Label: Solid State, Illusive Sounds
Million Dollar Sex Party	Released: 2008; Label: Universal Music Australia

=== Singles ===
List of singles, with selected chart positions
Title	Year	Peak chart positions	Album
Title	Year	AUS	Album
"Otherman"	2005	46	Sneakerpimpin Aint Easy
"Sneakerpimpin Aint Easy"	2006	—	Sneakerpimpin Aint Easy
"Stares and Whispers 05" (featuring Renee Geyer)	2006	—	Sneakerpimpin Aint Easy
"Don't Stop Movin"	2008	—	Million Dollar Sex Party
"Shades Off"	2009	—	Million Dollar Sex Party
