= Talk with Force =

Studio album by Phrase
- Released: September 26, 2005
- Genre: Hip hop
- Length: 64:00
- Label: Universal

Phrase chronology
Talk with Force (mixtape) (2005)	Talk with Force (2005)	Clockwork (2009)

Talk with Force is the debut studio album by Australian rapper Phrase. It was released on September 26, 2005 by Universal Music Australia.

== Track listing ==
1. "Talk with Force!
2. "Here Now" Featuring Mystro
3. "Hold On" Featuring Max White
4. "Taking Care of Business" Featuring Saigon
5. "Hookville" Featuring Lee Sissing
6. "Does She Like It" Featuring Brad Strut & Daniel Merriweather
7. "Nothin's Gonna Change"
8. "I'm Tired" Featuring Lee Sissing
9. "Amateur Muthafuckas"
10. "Heart & Soul"
11. "We Don't Sleep"
12. "Catch Phrase" Featuring Daniel Merriweather
13. "Rob N' Steal"
14. "Crooked Eye"
