= Pez (musician) =

- Also known as: Pez; P-Easy
- Born: Perry Chapman; 3 May 1984 (age 42); Melbourne, Victoria, Australia
- Genres: Hip hop
- Occupations: MC, rapper, singer
- Years active: 2004–present
- Labels: Soulmate, Easy, ForthWrite Records
- Website: MySpace webpage, pezmusic.com.au

Perry Chapman (born 3 May 1984), better known by his stage name Pez, is an Australian hip hop recording artist from Melbourne. He attended Kew High School in Melbourne's eastern suburbs. His debut album, A Mind of My Own, peaked at No. 19 on the ARIA Urban albums chart.

== Biography ==
Pez's debut album, A Mind of My Own, was produced by Matik (DEKAH1), with contributions from members of TZU, The Cat Empire, and Blue King Brown. It was released on 4 October 2008 by Soulmate Records (distributed by Inertia) and peaked at No. 19 on the ARIA Urban albums chart and No. 8 on the AIR albums chart. The single "The Festival Song" peaked at No. 14 on the ARIA Australian Singles chart and No. 1 on the AIR singles chart.

Pez made his first appearance in the Triple J Hottest 100 in the 2008 countdown, with "The Festival Song" (featuring 360) placing at number 7.

He has appeared on stage alongside US hip-hop artists Atmosphere, Mix Master Mike, Peanut Butter Wolf, Vanilla Ice, Lupe Fiasco, Brother Ali, and Akrobatik, as well as Australian acts such as 360, Seth Sentry, Illy, TZU, Muph & Plutonic, Drapht, Bliss n Eso, and Illzilla.

On 11 May 2009, "These Days 2009", a reworked version of the album track "These Days" featuring vocals by Hailey Cramer (Blue King Brown), aired on Triple J for the first time. A special edition of A Mind of My Own was released on 6 June 2009, featuring two new songs: "These Days 2009" and "Ain't Got Time" (Automatik Remix) featuring Dukes of Windsor and Seth Sentry; two videos: 'The Making of "These Days 2009"' and "The Festival Song"; and new cover art.

At the AIR Awards of 2009, Pez won Best Independent Hip Hop/Urban Album for A Mind of My Own.

In August 2011, Pez featured on the Tom Ugly single "I Was Somebody Else". He also featured on the Illy single "Where Ya Been", released in July 2012. Additionally, Pez featured on "Just Got Started", a single from 360's 2011 album Falling & Flying.

Pez stated in a freestyle that he has been diagnosed with Graves' disease. In late 2011, he announced on Facebook that he was working on a new album and mixtape intended for a Christmas release, however, this did not eventuate. He later announced the establishment of his own record label, Easy Records. The first release on the label was the iTunes single "Perfect Couple, Pt. 2" by Fozzey & VanC.

On 4 December 2012, Pez's single "The Game" premiered on Triple J, and was officially released by Soulmate Records on iTunes on 14 December 2012. In 2014, he collaborated again with 360 on the single "Live It Up", and the pair launched a new label called Forthwrite, along with plans for a collaborative album.

== Discography ==
=== Albums ===
List of albums, with selected details
Title	Details
A Mind of My Own	Released: October 2008; Format: CD; Label: Soulmate/Inertia (SOLM8003)
Don't Look Down	Released: November 2016; Format: CD; Label: Forthwrite (FWR006)

=== Charted or certified singles ===
Year	Single	Peak chart positions	Certifications	Album
Year	Single	AUS	Certifications	Album
2008	"The Festival Song" (featuring 360 and Hailey Cramer)	53	ARIA: 3× Platinum	A Mind of My Own
2013	"The Game"	99	ARIA: Gold	Non-album singles
2013	"One Life" (featuring Tys)	52		Non-album singles
2017	"Weekend" (featuring 360)	—	ARIA: Gold	Don't Look Down

== Awards and nominations ==
=== AIR Awards ===
The Australian Independent Record Awards (commonly known informally as AIR Awards) is an annual awards night to recognise, promote and celebrate the success of Australia's Independent Music sector.

Year	Nominee / work	Award	Result	Ref.
2009	A Mind of My Own	Best Independent Hip Hop/Urban Album	Won	

=== APRA Awards ===
The APRA Awards are presented annually from 1982 by the Australasian Performing Right Association (APRA), "honouring composers and songwriters".

Year	Nominee / work	Award	Result	Ref.
2010	"The Festival Song" (Perry Chapman, Matthew Colwell, Hailey Cramer, Stephen Mowat)	Urban Work of the Year	Nominated	

=== ARIA Music Awards ===
Year	Nominee / work	Award	Result	Ref.
2009	A Mind Of My Own	Best Urban Release	Nominated	

=== Music Victoria Awards ===
The Music Victoria Awards are an annual awards night celebrating Victorian music. They commenced in 2006.

Year	Nominee / work	Award	Result	Ref.
2017	Don't Look Down	Best Hip Hop Album	Nominated	
