= Phrase (rapper) =

Australian rapper (born 1981)

- Also known as: Big Phrase
- Born: Harley Webster
- Origin: Melbourne, Australia
- Genre: Hip hop
- Occupation: Rapper
- Years active: 1996–2011
- Label: Marlin/Universal
- Website: www.myspace.com/bigphrase

Harley Webster (born 1981) – better known as Phrase – is an Australian hip hop MC, originating from Melbourne.

== History ==
Phrase began to piece together an album with producers Daniel Merriweather and J-Skub (Jan Skubiszewki), while working part-time for the Reach Youth foundation, an organisation that Phrase credits with helping him overcome behavioural problems he had in his mid-teens. The album, Talk with Force was picked up for national release by Universal Music Australia in 2005. Three singles were released from this album, "Here Now" featuring Mystro, "Catch Phrase" featuring Daniel Merriweather, and "Hold On" featuring labelmate Max White.

In 2007 he founded the record label Crooked Eye with DJ Flagrant and J-Skub. The label's first release was a mixtape by Melbourne MC Illy (which Phrase also appears on). The same year, he released the non-album single "Face It" featuring Ian Kenny from Karnivool and Birds of Tokyo; which was used in the marketing campaign for the Australian release of Halo 3

In 2009 Phrase released his second album Clockwork, which included the high-rotation Triple J singles "Skylight" (featuring Kram) and "Clockwork". The album reached No. 26 on the ARIA albums chart and No. 6 on the ARIA Urban albums chart.

In 2011, Phrase returned with a new sound for his 3rd album Babylon. The first single was "Apart" featuring Davey Lane. Other guest artists featured on the album included Jimmy Barnes, Sparkadia's Alex Burnett, Guineafowl, The Preatures and Jane Doe. During an interview with Reegan from Radar, Phrase said that 'Babylon is not a hip-hop album, but an album with rap on it.' Following a tour in support of the album, Phrase withdrew from making music. He has not performed live or released any new material since.

== Personal life ==
Phrase married Australian R&B singer Jade MacRae. He attended Glen Waverley Secondary College as a teen; his father was an English teacher there. He has two sisters – a tattooist and an actress.

== Discography ==
=== Albums ===
List of albums, with selected details and chart positions
| Title | Details | Peak chart positions | |
| Title | Details | AUS | AUS Urban |
|---|---|---|---|
| Talk with Force | Released: 19 September 2005; Label: Marlin/Universal (987 382-4) | — | 29 |
| Clockwork | Released: 24 April 2009; Label: Marlin/Universal | 26 | — |
| Babylon | Released: 12 August 2011; Label: Marlin/Universal | 29 | — |

=== Mixtapes ===
- Talk with Force Mixtape (2005)

=== Singles ===
List of singles, with selected chart positions, showing year released and album name
| Title | Year | Peak chart positions | | | | Album |
| Title | Year | AUS | AUS Urban | AUS Aust | AUS Hits | Album |
|---|---|---|---|---|---|---|
| "Here Now" / "Talk with Force" | 2005 | — | — | — | 13 | Talk with Force |
| "Catch Phrase" | 2006 | 55 | 15 | 16 | 1 | Talk with Force |
| "Hold On" | 2006 | 60 | 14 | 19 | 1 | Talk with Force |
| "Face It" | 2007 | — | 36 | — | 15 | Non-album single |
| "Clockwork" | 2008 | — | — | — | 12 | Clockwork |
| "Skylight" (featuring Kram) | 2008 | — | — | — | — | Clockwork |
| "Spaceship" | 2009 | — | 28 | — | 5 | Clockwork |
| "All Good" | 2009 | — | — | — | — | Clockwork |
| "The Day You Went Away" (featuring Wendy Matthews) | 2009 | — | — | — | — | Clockwork |
| "Push Up" | 2010 | — | — | — | — | Clockwork |
| "Never Fade" | 2010 | — | — | — | — | Non-album single |
"—" denotes a recording that did not chart or was not released in that territory.

=== Guest appearances ===
- Daniel Merriweather – "Pot of Gold", "Crimson Stone" (Merriweather promo EP, 2004)
- Jade MacRae – "Superstar" (Crooked Eye remix) (single, 2005)
- Mystro – "MC Sick C*!t" (Diggi Down Under, 2006)
- Jase – "Four Seasons" (Jase Connection Vol. 1, 2006)
- Juse – "Tied Up" (Global Casino, 2006)
- Chopper Read – "Real Life" (Interview with a Madman, 2006)
- Infallible – "Two Sides of a Coin" (The Stratosphere)
- Amiel – "Following the Sun" (Crooked Eye remix) (Be Your Girl single, 2006)
- Tycotic – (The People vs. Tycotic mixtape, 2006)
- Illy – "Talk with Force 2007" (The Illy Mixtape, 2007)
- Tyree – "Ryders" (Now or Never, 2007)
- Bliss n Eso – "Happy in My Hoody" (Flying Colours, 2008)
- Illy – "For You" (Long Story Short, 2009)
- M-Phazes – "Music Box" (Good Gracious, 2010)

== Awards and nominations ==
- Nomination, 2007 Urban Music Awards Best Male Artist
- Winner, 2007 Urban Music Awards Best Hip Hop Single "Hold On"
- Winner, 2007 Urban Music Awards Best Video Clip "Hold On"

=== APRA Awards ===
The APRA Awards are presented annually from 1982 by the Australasian Performing Right Association (APRA), "honouring composers and songwriters". They commenced in 1982.

| Year | Nominee / work | Award | Result | Ref. |
|---|---|---|---|---|
| 2010 | "Spaceship" (Harley Webster, Robert Conley, Spencer Davies) | Urban Work of the Year | Nominated | |

=== ARIA Music Awards ===
The ARIA Music Awards is an annual awards ceremony that recognises excellence, innovation, and achievement across all genres of Australian music. They commenced in 1987.

| Year | Nominee / work | Award | Result | Ref. |
|---|---|---|---|---|
| 2006 | Talk with Force | Best Urban Release | Nominated | |

=== EG Awards / Music Victoria Awards ===
The EG Awards (known as Music Victoria Awards since 2013) are an annual awards night celebrating Victorian music. They commenced in 2006.

| Year | Nominee / work | Award | Result |
|---|---|---|---|
| 2009 | Phrase | Best Male | Unknown |

=== J Award ===
The J Awards are an annual series of Australian music awards that were established by the Australian Broadcasting Corporation's youth-focused radio station Triple J. They commenced in 2005.

| Year | Nominee / work | Award | Result |
|---|---|---|---|
| 2009 | Clockwork | Australian Album of the Year | Nominated |
