= Gossling =

Australian singer-songwriter

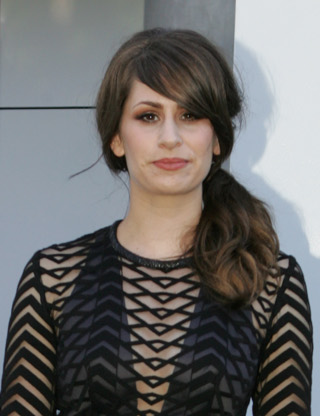
- Gossling at the 2013 ARIA Awards

Background information
- Born: Helen Elizabeth Croome; 1983 (age 42–43); Wodonga, Australia
- Genres: Folk, pop
- Occupation: Singer-songwriter
- Instruments: Vocals and piano
- Years active: 2009–present
- Website: gosslingmusic.com

Helen Elizabeth Croome (born 1983), better known by her stage-name Gossling, is an Australian folk/pop singer-songwriter. Gossling formed after Croome put Psychology/Sociology studies on hold to concentrate on a Bachelor of Music (Composition) at Box Hill Institute. In 2009 Croome met the musicians now joining her as Gossling being Joshua Jones – bass, Peter Marin – drums and Ryan Meeking- guitar. Gossling is currently signed to Australian record label Dew Process and UK label Polydor.

Her debut album Harvest of Gold was released in late 2013 to positive reviews. Her songs have been used in several popular television shows, and her cover of "Monday Tuesday Wednesday (I Love You)" by Ross Parker has been used in an advertising campaign for Woolworths. She was nominated for Channel V's Oz Artist of the Year in 2012 and was invited to perform at SXSW 2014.

== Discography ==
=== Albums ===
- Harvest of Gold (2013)

=== EPs ===
- "If You Can't Whistle" (2009)
- "Until Then" (November 2010)
- "Intentional Living" (April 2012)

=== Singles ===
- "Hazard" (2009)
- "I Was Young" (2010)
- "Wild Love" (2012)
- "Heart Killer" (2012)
- "Dance the Way I Feel" – Triple J Like A Version (2012)
- "Never Expire" (2013)
- "Harvest Of Gold" (2014)

=== Collaborations ===
- Guest vocals on "Boys like You" with 360, which sold over 300,000 copies and reached No. 3 on the ARIA charts
- "La Minute de Silence" with Alexander Gow of Oh Mercy, for Mélodie Française, a compilation of Australian artists performing French songs
- "Miracle in a Costume" – 360 Feat. Gossling (September 2011)
- "Somebody to Love Me" Gossling with Jordi Davieson (San Cisco) (August 2012)
- "Give Me a Kiss" with Henry Wagons (January 2013)
- "Price of Fame" with 360 (June 2014)
- "Made Me Like This" with 360 (January 2023)

=== Remixes ===
- "Never Expire (Oliver Tank Remix)" (2013)
- "Harvest Of Gold (YesYou Remix)" (January 2014)
- "That Feeling (Dylan Aiden Remix)" (May 2014)
- "Harvest Of Gold (Dylan Aiden Remix)" (September 2014)

== Awards and nominations ==
=== AIR Awards ===
The Australian Independent Record Awards (commonly known informally as AIR Awards) is an annual awards night to recognise, promote and celebrate the success of Australia's Independent Music sector.

Year	Nominee / work	Award	Result
2012	"Boys Like You" (360 featuring Gossling)	Best Independent Single	Nominated

=== APRA Awards ===
The APRA Awards are presented annually from 1982 by the Australasian Performing Right Association (APRA), "honouring composers and songwriters".

Year	Nominee / work	Award	Result	Ref.
2013	"Boys Like You" – 360 featuring Gossling (Kaelyn Behr, Matthew Colwell, Francis Jones, Bradford Pinto, Jack Revens)	Most Played Australian Song of the Year	Nominated	
2013	"Boys Like You" – 360 featuring Gossling (Kaelyn Behr, Matthew Colwell, Francis Jones, Bradford Pinto, Jack Revens)	Urban Work of the Year	Nominated	
2013	"Boys Like You" – 360 featuring Gossling (Kaelyn Behr, Matthew Colwell, Francis Jones, Bradford Pinto, Jack Revens)	Song of the Year	Shortlisted	

=== ARIA Awards ===
Year	Nominee / work	Award	Result
2012	"Boys like You" (360 featuring Gossling)	Song of the Year	Nominated
2012	"Boys like You" (featuring Gossling) – Alex Weltlinger	Best Video	Nominated
