= Daniel Merriweather =

Australian singer (born 1982)

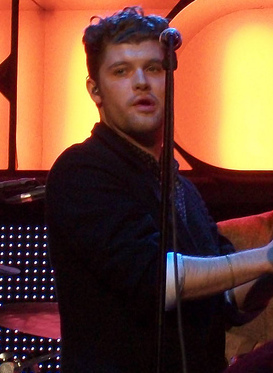
- Merriweather performing at Orange–Rockcorps in August 2008

Background information
- Born: Daniel Paul Merriweather; 17 February 1982 (age 44); Melbourne, Victoria, Australia
- Genres: R&B; pop; neo-soul; acid jazz; blue-eyed soul
- Occupations: Singer-songwriter; composer; record producer
- Instruments: Vocals; piano; guitar; sampler; keyboards
- Years active: 2002–present
- Labels: Marlin; J; Allido; RCA; Universal
- Website: instagram.com/danmerriweather

Daniel Paul Merriweather (born 17 February 1982) is an Australian R&B singer-songwriter and record producer. Merriweather's debut solo album, Love & War, was released in June 2009. It entered the UK Albums Chart at number two. It was preceded by two singles, "Change" and "Red", which both made the top 10 on the related singles chart. Merriweather has won two ARIA Music Awards, Best Urban Release in 2005 for "She's Got Me" and Best Male Artist in 2009 for Love & War.

In addition to his solo career, he has worked as a featured vocalist for other well-known artists. His guest vocals are included on album tracks by Disco Montego, Mark Ronson and Phrase. His collaborations with Ronson led to working in the United Kingdom including lead vocals on 2007 Ronson's hit "Stop Me", a cover version of "Stop Me If You Think You've Heard This One Before", a song by The Smiths, in medley with the Supremes' "You Keep Me Hangin' On". In November 2019, Merriweather announced his first single for ten years titled "Everything I Need", followed up by an album announcement. Merriweather also played 4 sold out London gigs.

Merriweather has been in a relationship with lawyer Coleen Mensa since 2017. In 2020, the couple gave birth to Zion Daniel Kojo Merriweather.

== Biography ==
=== Personal life ===
Daniel Paul Merriweather was born the eldest of three boys to teacher parents, and grew up in the Melbourne suburb of Sassafras in the Dandenong Ranges. Both his parents are teachers and he has two brothers. His maternal grandfather, Ted Ellis, was also an Australian rules footballer for North Melbourne and Footscray, while Daniel is an Essendon supporter.

Merriweather attended Billanook College, Blackburn High School, and Swinburne Senior Secondary College (for year 11) and left school when he was aged 17. His musical education began with violin lessons at the age of four; he started guitar at age 13; his music grades at Blackburn High were average. As a teen, he was in a social environment that cultivated violent tendencies and on one occasion was charged with assault. After dropping out of school, he focused his attention on music, taking vocal lessons and performing in clubs around Melbourne.

Merriweather spent much of his time between New York and London, and as from 2009 resided in East Harlem. Since the age of 18, Merriweather has had a tattoo on his inside-right forearm bearing the Latin phrase for "love or money".

Merriweather indicated in 2009 that he planned another tattoo for his back – a 100-word excerpt from the last verse of the poem "Jim Jones", quoted in Robert Hughes' book The Fatal Shore, which includes "For night and day ... we toil and toil".

=== Music ===
Daniel Merriweather's first commercially released recording was a guest appearance on the track "All I Want" for Australian dance act Disco Montego's self-titled album in September 2002. The album peaked at No.17 on the ARIA Albums Chart. He signed with the local label, Marlin Records, which led to work with Mark Ronson, a United Kingdom DJ and guitarist, on the latter's debut album, Here Comes the Fuzz, ("She's Got Me" and "NYC Rules") in September 2003. Merriweather signed with Ronson's label, Allido Records, and worked on his debut solo single, "City Rules", as a revised version of "NYC Rules". It was produced by Ronson and featured raps from New York MC Saigon and was issued in early 2004. Other musicians on the single are ?uestlove, The Black Eyed Peas' horn section and members of Beck's backing band. He received an ARIA Award nomination for "City Rules" in the Best Urban Release category at the 2004 ceremony.

"She's Got Me" was released as Merriweather's second single. While neither charted on the ARIA Top 50 Singles Chart, both became favourites in clubs and urban music circles. "City Rules" won the Most Performed Dance Work category at the APRA Awards of 2005 and "She's Got Me" won the Best Urban Release category at the ARIA Music Awards of 2005. "City Rules" obtained some airplay on the major Australian commercial radio stations FOX FM (Melbourne)/2Day FM and B105.

In 2005, he co-wrote and co-produced much of Phrase's debut album Talk with Force, also lending vocals to three tracks including the single "Catch Phrase". In March 2006, Undercover News reported that Merriweather was recording his debut album, The Fifth Season, with Ronson producing. However, in August 2011, Merriweather recalled: "It was 12 songs out of a whole bunch of songs that I'd written. I came up with the idea of calling it The Fifth Season and someone put it on Wikipedia. But it wasn't really an album – it was just a collection of songs. There's a difference".

In early 2007, Ronson featured Merriweather's lead vocals on a cover version of The Smiths' song "Stop Me If You Think You've Heard This One Before" released as "Stop Me". It was re-composed with additional lyrics from the song "You Keep Me Hangin' On" by The Supremes. Merriweather admitted in an interview with The Guardian that he was not familiar with the Smiths song prior to recording the revised version: "Mark said, 'I want you to sing on this - it's my favourite Smiths song', so I listened to it. I'd heard it once before, but I was never a Smiths fan. But I thought it was beautiful". It was issued as a single in April on Columbia Records and appeared on Ronson's studio album Version that same month. It was a commercial success in Ronson's native United Kingdom, where it reached number two on the UK Singles Chart. It peaked in the top 40 on the Swiss and Italian Singles Charts. Merriweather performed it during Glastonbury 2008.

Merriweather's debut solo album, Love & War, also produced by Ronson, was released in June 2009, which reached number two on the UK Albums Chart and peaked in the top 10 on the Swiss Albums Chart. It was preceded by the singles "Change" (February) and "Red" (May), which both made the top 10 on the UK Singles Chart. "Change" appeared in the top 10 on the Swiss Singles Top 75. While "Red" was a top 10 hit on the Danish and Irish Singles Charts. On the ARIA Albums Chart, Love & War reached the top 40 and "Change" peaked in the top 50 on the related singles chart. At the ARIA Music Awards of 2009, he won the Best Male Artist category for Love & War.

Merriweather was featured on Australian hip-hop artist Urthboy's single, "Naïve Bravado", in 2012. In that same year, Merriweather featured on hip-hop outfit Diafrix's single, "Simple Man". In 2013, Australian-American rap group Bliss N Eso worked with Merriweather on the track "Can't Get Rid of This Feeling". He appeared with DJ Mark Ronson in Glastonbury 2015 singing an earlier hit "Stop Me".

Merriweather cites Stevie Wonder, Prince, Jeff Buckley and Herbie Hancock as his major influences.

In November 2019, Daniel announced his first single for ten years titled 'Everything I Need', with talks of an album in the works. On 3 April 2020 Merriweather released 'Rain'. In February of the same year, he released single ‘Paradise’. Merriweather played a couple of sold out London gigs too.

In 2025, Merriweather appeared on several tracks on the Gary Bartz all-covers album, The Eternal Tenure of Sound: Damage Control. In 2026, Merriweather released his sophomore album, New Sincerity.

== Tours ==
In January 2004, Merriweather headlined the City Rules Tour of Australia with Mark Ronson, Scribe and P-Money. In March 2006, Merriweather supported Kanye West on his Australian tour. He opened for Biz Markie in Brooklyn and Justin Timberlake in London; He has performed live on various radio and television programs, including Late Night with Conan O'Brien, Triple J's Hip Hop Show, Radio 1's Live Lounge show, and Australian TV show, Sunrise.

He has performed at various festivals and events including the Montreux Jazz Festival (alongside Erick Sermon), the 2004 St Kilda Festival and 2004 Melbourne World AIDS Day Concert.

During 2007, he toured the UK with Mark Ronson (as well as performing several solo shows). He also performed with Ronson and the BBC Concert Orchestra at the 2007 BBC Electric Proms. He also performed at the MTV Video Music Awards on 9 September 2007 alongside Ronson who acted as the official DJ for the proceedings. On 22 February 2008, he appeared on BBC Radio One with Ronson to perform a special version of his track "Stop Me", as part of the Chris Moyles breakfast show.

He also played at the 2008 Brit Awards alongside Ronson. Also, he sang "Stop Me" on stage during Ronson's Glastonbury 2008 set. Merriweather performed in Australia for the first time since 2006 at the Global Gathering shows in November 2008 with Mark Ronson's Version Players.

At the 2009 O2 Wireless Festival in Hyde Park London, Merriweather headlined the second stage where Ronson supported him for half a set on guitar. Merriweather has appeared on television programmes such as The Justin Lee Collins Show and Britain's Got More Talent. He performed his single "Red" on T4 on the Beach 2009 in Weston-super-Mare.

Merriweather appeared as the musical guest on Late Night with Jimmy Fallon on 14 July 2009, performing "Change", and The Late Show with David Letterman on 18 February 2010 when he performed "Red".

In Spring 2010, Merriweather toured as the opening act for British light jazz and R&B singer Corinne Bailey Rae.

== Discography ==
- Love & War (2009)
- New Sincerity (2026)

== Awards ==
Year	Award	Category	Title	Result
2004	ARIA Awards	Best Urban Release	"City Rules"	Nominated
2005	APRA Awards	Most Performed Dance Work	"City Rules"	Won
2005	ARIA Awards	Best Urban Release	"She's Got Me"	Won
2009	ARIA Awards	Best Male Artist	Love & War	Won
2009	MTV Europe Music Awards	Best New Act		Nominated
2009	GQ Australia Awards	Breakthrough of the year		Won
2010	APRA Awards	Breakthrough Songwriter of the Year		Nominated
