= Bliss n Eso discography =

Australian hip-hop group discography

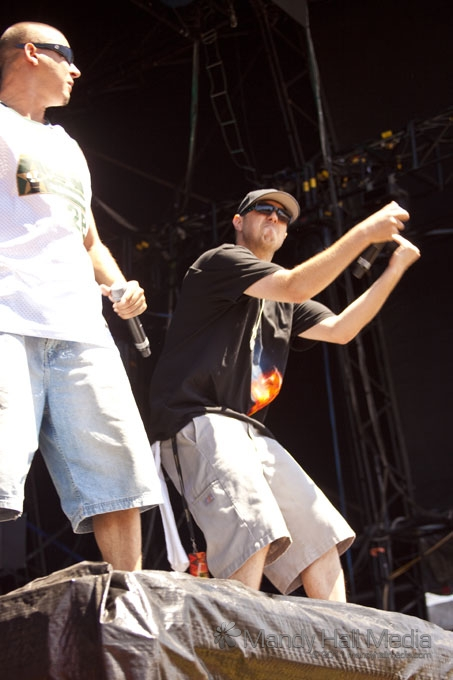
- Bliss n Eso at Big Day Out Melbourne 2011
- Studio albums: 9
- EPs: 1

The discography of Australian hip-hop group Bliss n Eso, consists of 9 studio albums and 1 extended play.

== Albums ==
=== Studio albums ===
List of studio albums, with release date, label, selected chart positions, and certifications shown
Title	Album details	Peak chart positions		Certifications
Title	Album details	AUS	US Heat.	Certifications
Flowers in the Pavement	Released: 23 August 2004; Label: Obese; Formats: CD, digital download	46	—	
Day of the Dog	Released: 4 March 2006; Label: Illusive Sounds; Formats: CD, digital download	19 (Note: Day of the Dog originally peaked at number 45 in Australia in 2006. It re-entered the chart at a new peak of number 19 in 2026.)	—	
Flying Colours	Released: 26 April 2008; Label: Illusive Sounds, Liberation; Formats: CD, digital download	10	—	ARIA: Platinum
Running on Air	Released: 30 July 2010; Label: Illusive, Liberation; Formats: CD, digital download	1	—	ARIA: Platinum
Circus in the Sky	Released: 28 June 2013; Label: Illusive, Liberation; Formats: CD, digital download, streaming	1	48	ARIA: Platinum
Off the Grid	Released: 28 April 2017; Label: Illusive; Formats: CD, LP, digital download, streaming	1	—	ARIA: Platinum
The Sun	Released: 27 August 2021; Label: Flight Deck, Mushroom; Formats: CD, digital download, streaming	2	—	
The Moon (The Light Side)	Released: 11 April 2025; Label: Flight Deck, Mushroom; Formats: CD, digital download, streaming, LP	1	*	
The Moon (The Dark Side)	Released: 26 September 2025; Label: Flight Deck, Mushroom; Formats: CD, digital download, streaming, LP	3	*	
"—" denotes releases that did not chart. "*" denotes a chart did not exist at that time.

== Extended plays ==
List of EPs, with release date and label shown
Title	Details
The Arrival	Released: 2000; Label: Independent; Formats: CD, digital download

== Singles ==
List of singles, with year released, selected chart positions, certifications, and album name shown
Title	Year	Peak chart positions		Certifications	Album
Title	Year	AUS	Triple J	Certifications	Album
"Up Jumped the Boogie"	2006	56	—		Day of the Dog
"Party at My Place" (featuring Motley)	2006	—	—	ARIA: Gold	Day of the Dog
"Then Till Now"	2006	—	—		Day of the Dog
"Mad Tight"	2006	—	—		Day of the Dog
"Coppin' It Sweet / Blazin'"	2007	—	—		Day of the Dog
"Bullet and a Target" (featuring Connections Zulu Choir)	2007	43	—		Flying Colours
"Woodstock 2008"	2008	—	94		Flying Colours
"The Sea Is Rising" (featuring John Butler Trio)	2008	80	61	ARIA: 2× Platinum	Flying Colours
"Eye of the Storm"	2009	—	40	ARIA: Platinum	Flying Colours
"On Tour"	2009	76	109		Flying Colours Live
"Down by the River"	2010	45	41	ARIA: 2× Platinum	Running on Air
"Addicted"	2010	38	23	ARIA: 6× Platinum	Running on Air
"Reflections"	2010	53	53	ARIA: 2× Platinum	Running on Air
"Coastal Kids"	2011	—	—	ARIA: Gold	Running on Air
"House of Dreams"	2013	45	94	ARIA: Platinum	Circus in the Sky
"Home Is Where the Heart Is"	2013	31	135	ARIA: Gold	Circus in the Sky
"Reservoir Dogs" (featuring Seth Sentry, 360, Pez and Drapht)	2013	96	123	ARIA: Platinum	Circus in the Sky
"Act Your Age"	2013	31	67	ARIA: 4× Platinum	Circus in the Sky
"My Life" (featuring Ceekay Jones)	2013	26	167	ARIA: 2× Platinum	Circus in the Sky
"I Am Somebody" (featuring Nas)	2014	80	—	ARIA: Gold	Circus in the Sky
"Dopamine" (featuring Thief)	2016	38	86	ARIA: Platinum	Off the Grid
"Friend Like You" (featuring Lee Fields)	2016	85	—	ARIA: Platinum	Off the Grid
"Moments" (featuring Gavin James)	2017	25	53	ARIA: 5× Platinum	Off the Grid
"Blue"	2017	—	—		Off the Grid
"Believe" (featuring Mario)	2017	—	—	ARIA: Gold	Off the Grid
"Fortunate Son"	2017	—	—		Non-album single
"Tear The Roof Off"	2018	—	—	ARIA: Platinum	Off the Grid
"Lighthouse" (featuring Jake Isaac)	2020	—	—		The Sun
"So Happy" (featuring Sonreal) / "Send It"	2020	—	—		The Sun
"Good People" (featuring Kasey Chambers)	2021	— (Note: "Good People" did not enter the ARIA Top 100 Singles Chart, but peaked at number 11 on the Top 20 Australian Hip Hop/R&B Singles Chart.)	—		The Sun
"OG's" (with Chillinit)	2021	—	—		The Sun
"On One" featuring Dizzee Rascal and Kings)	2021	—	—		The Sun
"Tell the World I'm Coming"	2021	—	—		The Sun
"Not Today"	2022	—	—		Non-album singles
"OG's" (with Brisbane Symphony Orchestra)	2022	—	—		Non-album singles
"Reflections" (with Brisbane Symphony Orchestra)	2022	—	—		Non-album singles
"Pale Blue Dot" (with Brisbane Symphony Orchestra)	2022	—	—		Non-album singles
"Friends Like You" (with Brisbane Symphony Orchestra)	2022	—	—		Non-album singles
"Hoops"	2023	—	—		Mushroom: Fifty Years of Making Noise (Reimagined)
"Feeling Fly"	2024	—	—		The Moon (The Light Side)
"Vacation"	2024	—	—		The Moon (The Light Side)
"Party on the Moon"	2025	—	—		The Moon (The Light Side)
"Take Me Higher"	2025	—	—		The Moon (The Light Side)
"Been Through Hell" (featuring 360, Benny Morrell and Masked Wolf)	2025	—	—		The Moon (The Light Side)
"Chemical Heart (Geed Up)" (with Grinspoon)	2025	—	—		The Moon (The Dark Side)
"Be Ok"	2025	—	—		The Moon (The Dark Side)
"My Gang"	2025	—	—		The Moon (The Dark Side)
"23 til Infinity"	2025	—	—		The Moon (The Dark Side)
"—" denotes releases that did not chart or were not released in that territory.

=== As featured artist ===
Year	Title	Lead artist	Album
2019	"High" (featuring Bliss n Eso and Lee Fields)	Timmy Trumpet	Non-album single

=== Other certified songs ===
List of other certified songs, with year released, certifications, and album name shown
Title	Year	Certifications	Album
"Get Your Boof On"	2006	ARIA: Gold	Day of the Dog
"Happy in My Hoody"	2008	ARIA: Gold	Flying Colours
"Family Affair"	2010	ARIA: Platinum	Running on Air
"Coolin'"	2017	ARIA: Gold	Off the Grid

=== Guest appearances ===
- Culture of Kings (song: "Lyrical Wilderness") (2002) (Australia) Obese Records
- Empirical Records Present... 'Straight from the Art' (2003), Warner Music (Australia) (song: "Greenhouse")
- Triple J Hip Hop Show (2005), ABC Music (song: "This Is for You")
- Triple J Home and Hosed—Bangin' n Breedin' (2006), ABC Music (song: "Then Till Now")
- Triple J Hottest 100 Vol. 16 (2009) ABC Music (song: "Eye of the Storm")
- Good Gracious (song: "Walk on Clouds") Obese Records (2010)
- Triple J Hottest 100 Vol. 18 (2018) ABC Music (song: "Moments feat. Gavin James ")
- Music from the Home Front (2020) Bloodlines Music (song "Moments" feat. Kate Ceberano and Vince Harder)
