= Retrospectable =

Greatest hits album by Bluejuice
- Released: 26 September 2014
- Length: 45:18

Bluejuice chronology
Company (2011)	Retrospectable (2014)

Singles from Company
- 1. "SOS" Released: September 2013; 2. "I'll Go Crazy" Released: 15 August 2014

Retrospectable is a greatest hits album by the Australian rock band Bluejuice, released through Dew Process in September 2014. The album was announced on Triple J on 4 August 2014 inconjuction with their retirement and farewell tour. Retrospectable peaked at number 27 on the ARIA Charts.

== Reception ==
James Tait from Scenewave Australia said "Retrospectable is their anthological swansong to sail off into the sunset in a yellow leotard with. It's a collection of previous singles including festival anthem 'Broken Leg' as well as the song that first brought them screaming and spitting onto the national stage; the twitchy, scuzzy, shouty, fantastic 'Vitriol'. There is an even enough split of well known material here from each of the Sydney boys' previous three albums to keep this one in high rotation in the car stereos of all of their fans as well as three new tracks that represent what a diverse and genre-bending musical act Bluejuice really became."

== Track listing ==
No.	Title	Writer(s)	Album	Length
1.	"Act Yr Age"		Company	3:20
2.	"I'll Go Crazy"		Retrospectable	3:04
3.	"Broken Leg"	Jake Stone, Stavros Yiannoukas, Jamie Cibej, James Hauptmann, Ned Molesworth	Head of the Hawk	3:12
4.	"Vitriol"		Problems	2:29
5.	"Shock"		Company	2:40
6.	"George Costanza"		Retrospectable	2:49
7.	"On My Own"		Company	3:17
8.	"Work"		Head of the Hawk	2:47
9.	"Ain't Telling the Truth"		Head of the Hawk	2:43
10.	"The Reductionist"		Problems	3:34
11.	"Aspen, New York"		Company	2:37
12.	"S.O.S"		Retrospectable	3:03
13.	"Cheap Trix"		Company	3:41
14.	"Head of the Hawk"		Head of the Hawk	2:44
15.	"No Time for Tears"		Retrospectable	3:10

== Charts ==
Chart (2014)	Peak position
Australian Albums (ARIA)	27

== Release history ==
Region	Date	Format	Label	Catalogue
Australia	26 September 2014	CD; digital download	Dew Process	DEW9000704
