= Esoterik =

- Also known as: Eso
- Born: Max Donald MacKinnon; 31 December 1980 (age 45); Australia
- Genres: Hip hop
- Occupation: Rapper

Max Donald Mackinnon (born 31 December 1980), who performs as Esoterik or Eso, is an Australian hip hop recording artist and founding member of Bliss n Eso since 2000.

In 2018, he released his debut solo EP, My Astral Plane. It was nominated for Best Urban Release at the 2018 ARIA Music Awards.

== Discography ==
=== Extended plays ===
List of EPs, with selected chart positions
Title	EP details	Peak chart positions
Title	EP details	AUS
My Astral Plane	Release date: 11 May 2018; Label: Flight Deck/Mushroom Music Publishing	42

=== Singles ===
List of singles, with selected details
Year	Song	Certifications	Album
2015	"Sunny Days"		Non-album single
2017	"Be Like You" (with James Crooks featuring Asta)	ARIA: Gold	My Astral Plane
2018	"Bless Up"		My Astral Plane
2018	"Wide Awake" (featuring Imbi the Girl and Spazzy D)		My Astral Plane
2018	"Shapeshifter" (featuring Locksmith and Illmac)		Non-album single
2021	"AF1" (with Hammy and Hazy)		Non-album single

== Awards and nominations ==
=== APRA Awards ===
The APRA Awards are presented annually from 1982 by the Australasian Performing Right Association (APRA), "honouring composers and songwriters".

Year	Nominee / work	Award	Result	Ref.
2009	"Woodstock 2008" (Max MacKinnon, Jonathan Notley, Noam Dishon)	Best Urban Work	Nominated	
2009	"The Sea Is Rising" – Bliss n Eso (Max MacKinnon, Jonathan Notley, Noam Dishon)	Best Urban Work	Nominated	
2010	"On Tour" – Bliss n Eso (Max MacKinnon, Jonathan Notley, Mark Landon)	Best Urban Work	Nominated	
2011	"Addicted" – Bliss n Eso (Max MacKinnon, Jonathan Notley)	Best Urban Work	Nominated	
2011	"Down By the River" – Bliss n Eso (Max MacKinnon, Jonathan Notley)	Best Urban Work	Nominated	
2012	"Reflections" – Bliss n Eso (Max MacKinnon, Jonathan Notley)	Best Urban Work	Nominated	
2012	"Act Your Age" – Bliss n Eso (featuring Bluejuice)	Song of the Year	Shortlisted	
2014	"Act Yr Age" (featuring Bluejuice)	Best Urban Work	Won	
2014	"House of Dreams" (Max MacKinnon, Jonathan Notley and M-Phazes)	Best Urban Work	Nominated	
2015	"My Life" – Bliss n Eso (Max MacKinnon, Jonathan Notley, Matthew Kirk, Nigel Kirk, Ebony West)	Best Urban Work	Nominated	
2018	"Moments" – Bliss n Eso (featuring Gavin James) (Kaelyn Behr, Peter James Harding, Max Mackinnon, Nicholas Martin, Jonathan Notley, Ryan Vojtesak)	Best Urban Work	Nominated	
2019	"Believe" – Bliss n Eso (featuring Mario) (Max MacKinnon, Jonathan Notley, PJ Harding, Cameron Ludik, Damian Smith)	Best Urban Work	Nominated	
2026	"Party On the Moon" - Bliss n Eso (Max MacKinnon, Jonathan Notley, Keith Elam, Chris Martin)	Most Performed Australian Work	Nominated	

=== ARIA Music Awards ===
The ARIA Music Awards is an annual awards ceremony that recognises excellence, innovation, and achievement across all genres of Australian music.

Year	Nominee / work	Award	Result	Ref.
2018	My Astral Plane	Best Urban Release	Nominated	
