= House of Dreams (song) =

Single by Bliss N Eso

from the album Circus in the Sky
- Released: 8 March 2013
- Recorded: 2013
- Genre: Hip hop
- Length: 4:26
- Label: Illusive Sounds
- Songwriter: Bliss and Eso

Bliss N Eso singles chronology
"Coastal Kids" (2011)	"House of Dreams" (2013)	"Home Is Where The Heart Is" (2013)

"House of Dreams" is a song by Australian hip hop trio Bliss n Eso. It was released on 8 March 2013 through Illusive Sounds as the first single from their fifth studio album Circus in the Sky. Critical reception to song was generally positive. 'House of Dreams' debuted on the ARIA Singles Chart at No. 47 and spent 5 weeks on the chart. It also finished at No. 94 on the Triple J Hottest 100 of 2013. Bliss n Eso performed the song alongside 'My Life' at the ARIA Music Awards of 2013 where they were nominated for 'Best Urban Album' for Circus in the Sky. The song was also used in a promo the 2013 AFL Grand Final. In July 2013 Bliss n Eso began their 'House of Dreams Tour'.

== Music video ==
The music video was released on 1 April 2013, and it spans 4 minutes and 48 seconds. In the video Bliss, Eso and DJ Izm rap the song having different coloured lights shine around and fire shooting into the air surrounding them, while a band plays the song behind them. An alternate albeit similar version of the video clip with the song shortened was used in a promo for the 2013 AFL Grand Final. The alternate version shows Bliss, Eso, DJ Izm and the band playing the song outside the Melbourne Cricket Ground, and has clips of Hawthorn Hawks and Fremantle Dockers players playing AFL. The main music video currently has over 2,000,000 views.

== Critical reception ==
The song received generally positive reviews. Moshpress.com wrote that "The single brings listeners that old-school Bliss N Eso vibe, reminiscent of Flying Colours and Flowers in the Pavement. All the classic elements are there: unexpected rhymes, swift, unpredictable beats and lyrical finesse that could only be expected by the dynamic duo".

== Chart performance ==
The song debuted at No. 47 on the ARIA Singles Chart, the following week it peaked at No. 45. It then dropped out of the top 50 and spent 3 more weeks in the top 100. It also finished at No. 94 in the Triple J Hottest 100 of 2013, making it Bliss n Eso's second highest entry for that year behind "Act Your Age".

== Charts ==
Charts (2013)	Peak position
Australia (ARIA)	45

== Certifications ==
Region	Certification	Certified units/sales
Australia (ARIA)	Platinum	70,000^{‡}
^{‡} Sales+streaming figures based on certification alone.
