= Act Your Age =

Act Your Age may refer to:

- "Act Your Age" (House), an episode of the American TV series House
- "Act Your Age" (Phineas and Ferb), an episode of the American TV series Phineas and Ferb
- Act Your Age (radio series), a BBC Radio 4 panel game hosted by Simon Mayo
- Act Your Age (TV show), an TV show on the network Bounce TV

== Music ==
- Act Your Age (Home Grown album)
- Act Your Age (Gordon Goodwin's Big Phat Band album)
- "Act Your Age" (song), a song by Bliss n Eso
  - "Act Yr Age", a 2011 single by Bluejuice, sampled in the Bliss n Ego song.
- "Act Your Age", song by The Four Esquires 1959
