= My Astral Plane =

2018 EP by Esoterik

EP by Esoterik
- Released: 11 May 2018
- Labels: Flight Deck, Illusive Sounds

Singles from My Astral Plane
- 1. "Be Like You" Released: 12 October 2017; 2. "Bless Up" Released: 23 February 2018; 3. "Wide Awake" Released: 13 April 2018

My Astral Plane is the debut EP by Australian hip-hop artist Esoterik. The EP was announced in April 2018 and released on 11 May 2018. It peaked at number 42 on the ARIA Charts.

The EP was supported by an Australian east coast tour through August 2018.

At the 2018 ARIA Music Awards, the EP was nominated for Best Urban Release.

== Reception ==
James d'Apice from The Music said "Eso's debut solo release is so profoundly optimistic that it's difficult not to smile and be carried along for the ride."

Aleisha McLarenfrom Scenestr called the EP "next level".

== Track listing ==
1. "Welcome" (Intro) - 1:25
2. "Just for You" - 5:29
3. "Bless Up" - 3:45
4. "Stay Fly" - 3:51
5. "Love Is the Vibe" - 4:28
6. "Fucking With This Shit" - 3:06
7. "Be Like You" (with James Crooks, featuring Asta) - 3:48
8. "Make 'Em Say" (featuring Ev Jones) - 3:37
9. "Wide Awake" (featuring Spazzy D & imbi the girl) - 4:52

== Charts ==
Weekly chart performance for My Astral Plane
| Chart (2018) | Peak position |
|---|---|
| Australian Albums (ARIA) | 42 |

== Release history ==
| Region | Date | Format | Label | Catalogue |
|---|---|---|---|---|
| Various | 11 May 2018 | digital download | Illusive Sounds | —N/a |
| Australia | 25 May 2018 | CD | Illusive Sounds | ILL175 |
