= J Awards of 2010 =

Annual Australian music awards

- Date: 30 November 2010
- Venue: Australia
- Website: abc.net.au/triplej

The J Award of 2010 is the sixth annual J Awards, established by the Australian Broadcasting Corporation's youth-focused radio station Triple J. The announcement comes at the culmination of Ausmusic Month (November). For the third year, three awards were presented; Australian Album of the Year, Australian Music Video of the Year and Unearthed Artist of the Year. The announcement occurred on 30 November 2010.

== Who's eligible? ==
Any Australian album released independently or through a record company, or sent to Triple J in consideration for airplay, is eligible for the J Award. The 2010 nominations for Australian Album of the Year and Australian Music Video of the Year were selected from releases received by Triple J between November 2009 and October 2010. For Unearthed Artist of the Year it was open to any artist from the Unearthed (talent contest), who has had a groundbreaking and impactful 12 months from November 2009 and October 2010.

== Awards ==
=== Australian Album of the Year ===
Artist	Album Title	Result
Tame Impala	Innerspeaker	Won
Cloud Control	Bliss Release	Nominated
Sia	We Are Born	Nominated
Washington	I Believe You Liar	Nominated
Birds of Tokyo	Birds of Tokyo	Nominated
Bliss N Eso	Running on Air	Nominated
Parkway Drive	Deep Blue	Nominated
M-Phazes	Good Gracious	Nominated
Bag Raiders	Bag Raiders	Nominated
Angus & Julia Stone	Down the Way	Nominated

Dom Alessio on Innerspeaker said "Who needs drug trips when you've got Tame Impala? This album envelopes you with its dense guitars, rolling drums and swirling, psychedelic melodies. The attention to detail that Kevin & Co have on their debut is incredible. It's no surprise this album is getting rave reviews around the world."

=== Australian Video of the Year ===
Director	Artist and Song	Result
Mairi Cameron and Stephen Lance	Washington - "Sunday Best"	Won
Sam Kristofski	Parades - "Loserspeak in a New Tongue"	Nominated
John Hillcoat	Grinderman - "Heathen Child"	Nominated
Director: SPOD	Richard in Your Mind - "Candelraba"	Nominated
Lucinda Schreiber and Beatrice Pegard	Midnight Juggernauts - "Lara Versus the Savage Pack"	Nominated

=== Unearthed Artist of the Year ===
Artist	Notes	Result
Boy And Bear	Unearthed winners for the Homebake festival in 2009, they have toured Australia with Angus and Julia Stone and Hungry Kids of Hungary. In 2010, they toured Britain with Laura Marling and supported Mumford & Sons on their Australian tour.	Won
Stonefield	Winners of the Unearthed High competition in 2010, from Gisborne, Victoria. Performed at the triple j showcase at the One Movement Festival in Perth, which resulted in them being booked for Glastonbury.	Nominated
Gypsy & The Cat	Played the NME weekender festival in London. They have also played at a number of Australian festivals and have supported The Strokes and Foals.	Nominated
Big Scary	A two-piece band, who were the unearthed winners for the Pushover Festival in Melbourne. They have supported Editors, Florence and the Machine and toured with Birds of Tokyo.	Nominated
The Jezabels	A four-piece musical group from Sydney and have played a number of festivals around Australia. They also supported Canada's Tegan and Sara on their Australian tour, as well as touring with Regurgitator, Bluejuice, Dukes of Windsor, Van She, Sparkadia and Josh Pyke.	Nominated
