= Heartbeat Away =

Heartbeat Away may refer to:

- A Heartbeat Away, a 2011 Australian musical comedy film
- "Heartbeat Away", a 2010 song by Bag Raiders from their self-titled album
- "Heartbeat Away", a 2017 song by Sheryl Crow from her album Be Myself
