= Act My Age =

Act My Age may refer to:

- "Act My Age", a song by Hoodie Allen from People Keep Talking
- "Act My Age", a song by One Direction from Four
- "Act My Age", a song by Madchild from Switched On
- "Act My Age", a song by Katy Perry from Witness

== See also ==
- At My Age
- Act Your Age (disambiguation)
