= Circus in the Sky =

Circus In The Sky

Studio album by Bliss n Eso
- Released: 28 June 2013
- Recorded: 2012–2013
- Genre: Hip-hop
- Length: 59:09
- Label: Illusive Sounds/Liberation Music
- Producers: DJ Izm, MC Bliss, MC Eso, M-Phazes

Bliss n Eso chronology
Running on Air (2010)	Circus In The Sky (2013)	Off the Grid (2017)

Singles from Circus In The Sky
- 1. "House of Dreams" Released: 8 March 2013; 2. "Home Is Where The Heart Is" Released: 10 May 2013; 3. "Reservoir Dogs" Released: 21 June 2013; 4. "Act Your Age" Released: 16 August 2013; 5. "My Life" Released: 11 November 2013; 6. "I Am Somebody" Released: May 2014

Circus In The Sky is the fifth studio album by the Australian hip-hop trio Bliss n Eso, following 2010's Running On Air. It was released on 28 June 2013 through Illusive Sounds. The album revolves around themes such as optimism, freedom, and peace. The album debuted at No. 1 on the ARIA Albums Chart.

Bliss N Eso toured in support for the album on the House of Dreams Tour in 2013 and the Circus Under the Stars Tour in 2014.

Circus In The Sky was nominated for an ARIA Music Award for Best Urban Album.

== Background ==
Bliss n Eso began recording Circus in the Sky in late 2012, a large portion of the album in a portable studio while touring. It was also Bliss N Eso's first album with live strings. Bliss said "We've felt like we've evolved, really pushed ourselves creatively, and pushed the boundaries".

== Track listing ==
No.	Title	Length
1.	"Unite"	2:40
2.	"Pale Blue Dot"	3:32
3.	"I Am Somebody" (featuring Nas)	5:10
4.	"Home Is Where The Heart Is"	3:30
5.	"Animal Kingdom"	2:42
6.	"Can't Get Rid of This Feeling" (featuring Daniel Merriweather)	4:25
7.	"Act Your Age"	2:39
8.	"Life's Midnight"	4:02
9.	"Reservoir Dogs" (featuring Seth Sentry, Pez, 360 and Drapht)	4:13
10.	"Next Frontier"	2:24
11.	"My Life" (featuring Ceekay Jones)	3:37
12.	"Jungle"	3:02
13.	"Cialis Cuts" (featuring Alex Williamson)	1:22
14.	"Bomb Like Banksy"	3:24
15.	"Sunshine"	3:28
16.	"I Feel Free"	3:45
17.	"House of Dreams"	4:26

== Charts ==
=== Weekly charts ===
Chart (2013)	Peak position
Australia (ARIA)	1

=== Year-end charts ===
Chart (2013)	Position
Australian Albums Chart	34
Chart (2014)	Position
Australian Albums Chart	89

== Certifications ==
Region	Certification	Certified units/sales
Australia (ARIA)	Platinum	70,000^{^}
^{^} Shipments figures based on certification alone.

== Release history ==
Region	Date	Format	Edition(s)	Label	Catalogue
Australia	28 June 2013	CD; digital download	Standard edition	Illusive Sounds	ILL093CD / ILL094CD
