= As Above, So Below (Stonefield album) =

Studio album by Stonefield
- Released: 15 July 2016
- Genre: Rock, psychedelic rock
- Length: 40:48
- Label: Illusive Sounds, Wunderkind
- Producer: John Lee

Stonefield chronology
Stonefield (2013)	As Above, So Below (2016)	Far from Earth (2018)

Professional ratings
Review scores
Source	Rating
Rolling Stone	4/5 stars

As Above, So Below is the second studio album by Australian psychedelic rock band Stonefield. It was announced on 9 May 2016 on their Facebook page.

== Track listing ==
All tracks are written by Amy Findlay, Hannah Findlay, Sarah Findlay, Holly Findlay.

No.	Title	Length
1.	"Sister"	3:58
2.	"Dream"	3:41
3.	"Changes"	4:03
4.	"Love"	3:33
5.	"Stranger"	2:44
6.	"Eyes"	4:52
7.	"Higher"	3:12
8.	"Midnight"	5:37
9.	"Lonely"	3:34
10.	"Eagle"	5:34
Total length:		40:48

== Personnel ==
Stonefield

- Amy Findlay – vocals, drums
- Hannah Findlay – guitar
- Holly Findlay – bass
- Sarah Findlay – keyboards, vocals

Production

- Dave Walker – mastering
- John Lee – producer

== Charts ==
Chart (2016)	Peak position
Australian Albums (ARIA)	19
