= Vitriol (disambiguation) =

Vitriol is an archaic word for the sulfates of certain metals.

Vitriol or VITRIOL may also refer to:

- "Vitriol" (song), a song by Australian indie rock band Bluejuice
- VITRIOL, an acronym referencing an emblem and alchemical symbol representing the Emerald Tablet and featuring the Latin acrostic "Visita interiora terrae rectificando invenies occultum lapidem"
- Dave Hunt (musician), also known by the pseudonym V.I.T.R.I.O.L., vocalist of the extreme metal band Anaal Nathrakh

== See also ==
- Chamber of Reflection, a ritual space used in the rites of Freemasonry which prominently features the acronym V∴I∴T∴R∴I∴O∴L∴
