= Day of the Dog =

Studio album by Bliss n Eso
- Released: 4 March 2006
- Genre: Hip-hop
- Length: 68:12
- Label: Illusive Sounds
- Producers: Weapon X; Motley; DJ Hoppa; Suffa; Trillion; Trax; M-Phazes; Se-Fu; Rocc; Wika; Bliss

Bliss n Eso chronology
Flowers in the Pavement (2004)	Day of the Dog (2006)	Flying Colours (2008)

Singles from Day of the Dog
- 1. "Up Jumped the Boogie" Released: 26 January 2006; 2. "Party At My Place" Released: March 2006; 3. "Then Till Now" Released: October 2006; 4. "Mad Tight" Released: 2006; 5. "Coppin' It Sweet / Blazin'" Released: 2007

Professional ratings
Review scores
Source	Rating
Australian Music Online	8/10

Day of the Dog is the second album by Australian hip-hop group Bliss n Eso. It was released via Illusive Sounds in March 2006. The title is a metaphor for Australian hip-hop being the 'underdog' of the Australian music industry, and affirming that it is now time for it to rise up. It peaked at No. 45 on the ARIA Albums Chart in March 2006.

== Track listing ==
All tracks are written by Jonathon Notley and Max MacKinnon, except where noted

No.	Title	Writer(s)	Length
1.	"The Dreamer"		0:51
2.	"It's Working"	J. Warburton	4:08
3.	"Up Jumped the Boogie"		3:57
4.	"Then Till Now"	Xavier Millis	3:47
5.	"Coppin' It Sweet"	J. Lloyd	3:54
6.	"Get Your Boof On"	Millis	4:17
7.	"Get Loose" (featuring Hyjak)	J McCarthy, Nathwani	3:30
8.	"Mad Tight"	Warburton	3:39
9.	"Nowhere But Up"	Kevin Amarfio	3:19
10.	"Watch Your Mouth" (featuring Mystro)		3:56
11.	"Party at My Place" (featuring Motley)	Warburton	4:18
12.	"Evening Breeze"	Jhi Smith, Hugh Vassall, Daniel Mascord	3:11
13.	"That Feeling"	Mark Landon	3:50
14.	"Lights Camera Action"	Millis	3:59
15.	"Soldier On" (featuring Kye)	Lloyd	9:58
16.	"Good Mourning Australia"		4:36

Bonus tracks
No.	Title	Length
17.	"Worldwide"	4:06
18.	"Blazin'"	1:57
19.	"Them Boys"	3:37

Day of the Dog: Phazed Out

1. "The Dreamer" (M-Phazes Remix)
2. "Its Working" (M-Phazes Remix)
3. "Up Jumped the Boogie" (M-Phazes Remix)
4. "Then Till Now" (M-Phazes Remix)
5. "Coppin' It Sweet" (M-Phazes Remix)
6. "Get Your Boof On "(M-Phazes Remix)
7. "Get Loose" (M-Phazes Remix)
8. "Mad Tight" (M-Phazes Remix)
9. "Nowhere But Up" (M-Phazes Remix)
10. "Watch Your Mouth" (M-Phazes Remix)
11. "Party at My Place" (M-Phazes Remix)
12. "Evening Breeze" (M-Phazes Remix)
13. "That Feeling" (M-Phazes Remix)
14. "Lights Camera Action" (M-Phazes Remix)
15. "Soldier On" (M-Phazes Remix)
16. "Good Morning Australia" (M-Phazes Remix)

== Charts ==
Chart (2006)	Peak position
Australian Albums (ARIA)	45

Chart (2026)	Peak position
Australian Albums (ARIA)	19
Australian Hip Hop/R&B Albums (ARIA)	1

== Release history ==
Region	Date	Format	Edition(s)	Label	Catalogue
Australia	4 March 2006	CD	Standard edition + bonus track	Illusive Sounds	LIBCD8192.2
Australia	4 March 2006	2×CD	Limited edition (with bonus disc)	Illusive Sounds	LIBCD8192.3
Australia	September 2006	2×LP	Day of the Dog (Limited Edition - Phazed Out) (50 copies)	Illusive Sounds	ILL04232LE
