= Be Like You (disambiguation) =

"Be Like You" is a song by Australian hip-hop artist Esoterik

Be Like You may also refer to:

- "Be Like You", a song by ATB from Distant Earth
- "Be Like You", a song by Collington (band)
- "Be Like You", a song by Dune Rats from If It Sucks, Turn It Up
- "Be Like You", a song by Ed Sheeran from 5
- "Be Like You", a song by Finding Favour from Reborn
- "Be Like You", a song by Miller Boyz from Hip Hop History
- "Be Like You", a song by Moloko from I Am Not a Doctor
- "Be Like You", a song by Nemo (singer)
- "Be Like You", a song by PsychoYP
- "Be Like You", a song by Tyler Shaw
- "Be Like You", a song by Whethan
