= Stonefield (album) =

Studio album by Stonefield
- Released: 11 October 2013
- Genre: Rock, psychedelic rock
- Length: 37:02
- Label: Illusive, Wunderkind
- Producer: Ian Davenport

Stonefield chronology
Bad Reality (2012)	Stonefield (2013)	As Above, So Below (2016)

Stonefield is the debut studio album by Australian psychedelic rock band Stonefield. It was released on 10 October 2013, under Illusive and Wunderkind.

== Track listing ==
All tracks are written by Amy Findlay, Hannah Findlay, Sarah Findlay, Holly Findlay, except additional writing on tracks 1 and 4 by Elliot Hammond and Alexander Ledlie Markwell, and track 6 by Jarrod Brown.

No.	Title	Length
1.	"C'mon"	3:20
2.	"Love You Deserve"	3:41
3.	"Put Your Curse On Me"	3:22
4.	"Over and Over"	2:55
5.	"To the Mountains"	3:09
6.	"Diggin' My Way Out"	4:10
7.	"House of the Lonely"	4:03
8.	"To Whom It May Concern"	4:15
9.	"Baby Blue"	3:29
10.	"Keep On Rollin'"	4:38
Total length:		37:02

== Personnel ==
Stonefield

- Amy Findlay – vocal, drums
- Hannah Findlay – guitar
- Holly Findlay – bass
- Sarah Findlay – keys, vocal

Additional musicians

- Phil Heuzenroeder – choir (track 3)
- Melbourne Mass Gospel Choir – choir (track 3)

Production

- Ian Davenport – engineer, producer
- Matthew Neighbour – engineer
- Travis Kennedy – assistant engineer
- Justin Shturtz – mastering
- Tim Palmer – mixing
- Jo Duck – photography
- Karl Kwansy – art direction, design
- Lauren Dietze – stylist
