= Mickey Kojak =

Australian electronic musician

- Born: Michael Dable; 20 September 1994 (age 32)
- Origin: Sydney, Australia
- Genres: Dance; electronic; EDM; indie rock
- Occupations: Singer; songwriter; musician; producer
- Labels: Alt Vision; Casablanca Records

Michael Dable (born 20 September 1994), known professionally as Mickey Kojak, is an Australian musician, singer, songwriter and producer from Sydney, New South Wales. Mickey supported Bag Raiders on their 2019 Horizons tour. Mickey received full rotation on radio for songs "Get Out" and "All That Acid". His debut studio album Ultra is scheduled for release in 2022.

== Early life ==
Dable was born on 20 September 1994.

== Career ==
=== 2021–present: Ultra ===
On 20 August 2021, Dable released the single "Lights Out". Alongside the single's release, he announced the title of his forthcoming debut album Ultra, revealing it would be released in 2022.

In 2022 his debut album “Ultra”, was released digitally

== Musical style and influences ==
Dable's music has been categorised as dance, electronic, and indie rock.

== Discography ==
=== Studio albums ===
List of studio albums, with release date and label shown
Title	Details
Ultra	Released: 2022; Label: Independent; Formats: Digital download, streaming

=== Extended plays ===
List of extended plays, with release date and label shown
Title	Details
Alone	Released: 2016; Label: Independent; Formats: Digital download, streaming
Surrender	Released: 2017; Label: Independent; Formats: Digital download, streaming
Together	Released: 8 April 2019; Label: Independent; Formats: Digital download, streaming

=== Singles ===
==== As lead artist ====
List of singles, with year released and album name shown
Title	Year	Album
"Feel My Pain"	2014	Non-album single
"Save Your Breath"	2017	Surrender
"Ghost"	2017	Surrender
"Get Out"	2018	Non-album singles
"All That Acid"	2018	Non-album singles
"It's Gonna Be Okay"	2019	Together
"Video Games"	2019	Together
"Lights Out"	2021	Ultra

==== As featured artist ====
List of singles, with year released and album name shown
Title	Year	Album
"Electronic Memories" (K?D featuring Mickey Kojak)	2018	Paradise
"Wild At Heart" (Bag Raiders featuring Mickey Kojak)	2019	Horizons
