= The Sea Is Rising =

Single by Bliss n Eso featuring John Butler Trio

from the album Flying Colours
- Released: 2008
- Genre: Hip hop
- Length: 5:35
- Label: Illusive Sounds
- Songwriters: Jonathon Notley, Max MacKinnon and Noam Dishon
- Producers: DJ Izm, MC Bliss, Hattori Hunzo

Bliss n Eso singles chronology
| "Woodstock 2008" (2008) | "The Sea Is Rising" (2008) | "Eye of the Storm" (2009) |

"The Sea Is Rising" is a song by Australian hip hop trio Bliss n Eso featuring John Butler Trio. It was released in 2008 as the third single from the trio's third studio album, Flying Colours. The song peaked and debuted at No. 80 on the ARIA Singles Chart. In 2013, five years after its release, it was certified gold by the Australian Recording Industry Association for sales/shipments of over 35,000 copies.

== Music video ==
The song's accompanying music video runs for 6 minutes and 46 seconds. It was released 28 October 2008. In the video Bliss n Eso walk down the street rapping the song, gradually gaining a following, as well as standing on a beach while TV's show clips of pollution and its effects for the human race.

== Content ==
The song is about global warming, where 'The Sea is Rising' because icebergs are melting from the Earth's increased air temperature from pollution. The song's composition consists of a remixed rendition of The Delfonics song "Ready Or Not."

== Chart performance ==
The song debuted and peaked at No. 80. It stayed on the chart for four weeks. It finished at No. 61 on the Triple J Hottest 100 for 2008.

== Charts ==
| Charts (2008) | Peak position |
|---|---|
| Australia (ARIA) | 80 |

== Certifications ==
| Region | Certification | Certified units/sales |
|---|---|---|
| Australia (ARIA) | Gold | 35,000^{^} |
^{^} Shipments figures based on certification alone.
