= Company (Bluejuice album) =

Studio album by Bluejuice
- Released: 11 November 2011
- Genre: Indie rock
- Producer: Chris Shaw

Bluejuice chronology
Head of the Hawk (2009)	Company (2011)	Retrospectable (2014)

Singles from Company
- 1. "Act Yr Age" Released: 2011; 2. "On My Own" Released: March 2012; 3. "The Recession" Released: 29 June 2012

Company is the third and final studio album by the Australian rock band Bluejuice, released through Dew Process on 11 November 2011. The album peaked at number 23 on the ARIA Charts.

The album was supported by an Australian 'Sizzling 2012' tour in January 2012.

The album is scheduled for release on vinyl for first time in November 2022.

== Reception ==
Beat Magazine said "Evoking the feeling of all great '80s bands like Hall and Oates, Men at Work, Chic and many more, the loveable Sydney lads have improved immensely from their spirited, fun-loving Head of the Hawk". Beat Magazine praised the song-writing and said "it's great to hear an Australian band unashamedly making high-concept pop, while addressing first world problems."

ABC music editor Anne-Marie Middlemast said "Mixing up pop, rock, electro and disco... Bluejuice are in their element on their latest record, Company... Losing none of their cheekiness and irreverent sense of humour"

Michael Dwyer from Rolling Stone said "Three albums in, these jive turkeys have cracked the rhythmic code... and built a funk-pop wall of sound around it".

== Track listing ==
1. "Can't Keep Up" - 2:43
2. "Act Yr Age" - 3:20
3. "You Haven't Changed" - 1:58
4. "Cheap Trix" - 3:41
5. "I'll Put You On" - 2:30
6. "The Recession" - 3:03
7. "Aspen, New York" - 2:38
8. "Shock" - 2:41
9. "Do You Will?" - 2:15
10. "Dressed for Success" - 2:10
11. "Kindaevil" - 2:32
12. "On My Own" - 3:17

== Charts ==
Chart (2011)	Peak position
Australian Albums (ARIA)	23

== Release history ==
Region	Date	Format	Label	Catalogue
Australia	11 November 2011	CD; digital download	Dew Process	DEW9000396
Australia	11 November 2022	LP	Dew Process	DEW9001427
