= Stonefield (band) =

Australian rock band

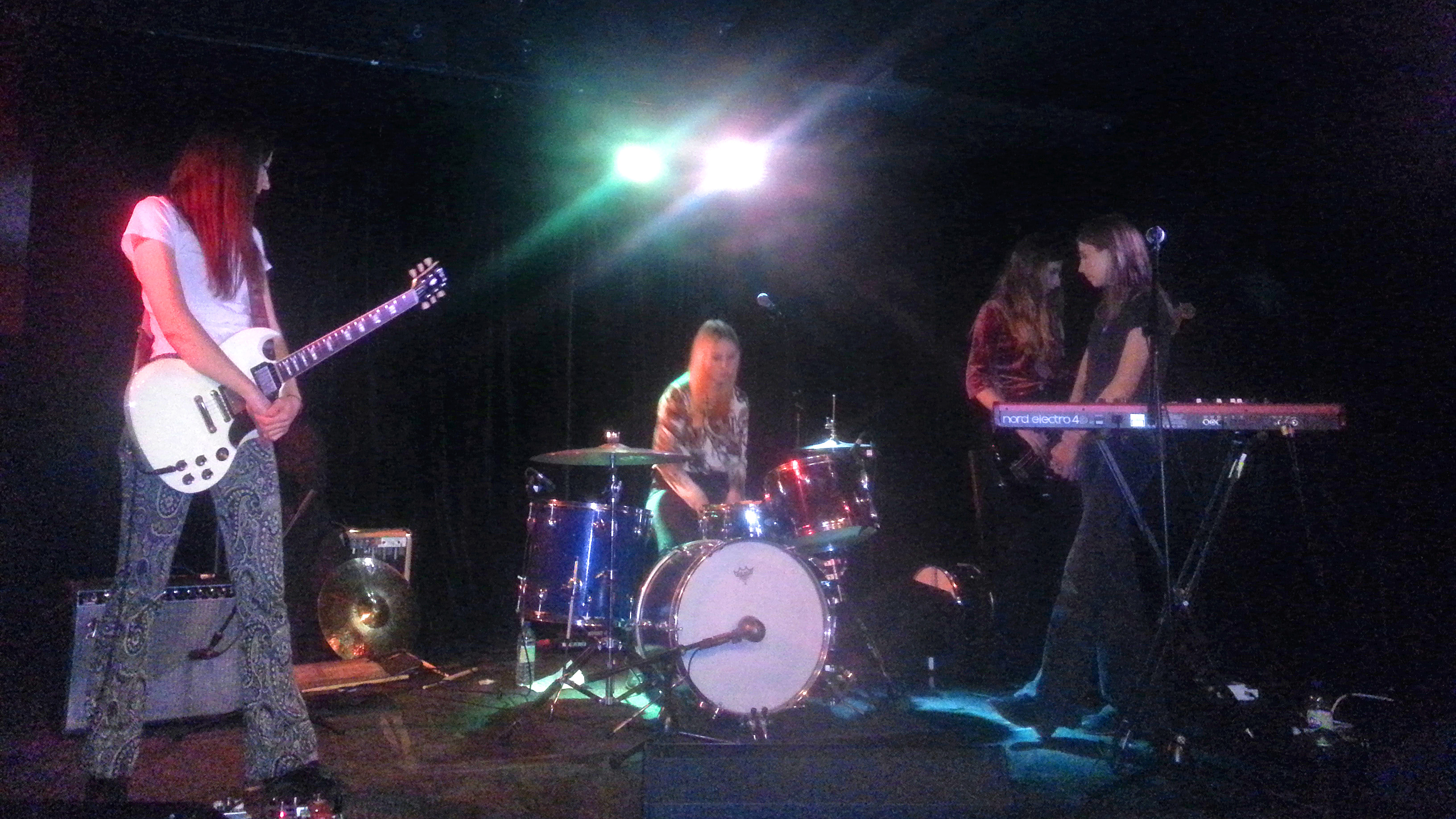
- Left to right: Hannah, Amy, Holly and Sarah Findlay performing at Divan Orange, Montreal in June 2016

Background information
- Also known as: Iotah
- Origin: Darraweit Guim, Victoria, Australia
- Genres: Rock; psychedelic rock; stoner rock; hard rock; doom metal
- Years active: 2006–present
- Labels: Shock; Wunderkind/Universal; Illusive/Universal; Flightless
- Members: Amy Cavanagh (née Findlay); Hannah Findlay; Holly Findlay; Sarah Findlay
- Website: stonefieldband.com

Stonefield are an Australian rock band comprising the four Findlay sisters: Amy, Hannah, Sarah and Holly. They were formed in 2006 as Iotah in Darraweit Guim, a small town in rural Victoria. They changed their name in 2010 and have released four studio albums, Stonefield (October 2013), As Above, So Below (July 2016) — which peaked at No. 19 on the ARIA Albums Chart — Far from Earth (April 2018), and Bent (June 2019).

== History ==
Stonefield were formed in late 2006 as Iotah in Darraweit Guim, a hamlet in Victoria's Macedon Ranges, by Amy Lee Findlay (born c. 1990) on drums and lead vocals, and her three younger sisters, Hannah (born c. 1993) on lead guitar and vocals, Sarah (born c. 1994) on keyboards and vocals, and Holly (born c. 1998) on bass guitar. The sisters rehearsed in their parents' farm shed "with a '70s-inspired soulful rock sound."

They won the Triple J Unearthed High contest, held for secondary school artists, in June 2010 with their song "Foreign Lover", which was then placed in high rotation on the national radio network. After the win, the band changed their name to Stonefield due to "discovering there was a cabaret performer called iOTA." They released a five-track extended play, Through the Clover (November 2010), with Greg Wales producing via Shock Records. Stonefield were an Unearthed J Award nominee in that year. Amy completed her Bachelor of Australian Popular Music degree in 2010 at Northern Melbourne Institute of TAFE (NMIT), which was later renamed as Melbourne Polytechnic.

After the band played at the One Movement Festival in Perth in October 2010, they were approached by a scout for the Glastonbury Festival and were invited to appear at the next year's festival. They played the second slot on the John Peel Stage on 26 June 2011. The Age's Elizabeth Colman felt "[they] more than held their own at one of the world's biggest music events", adding that "the talented foursome's raw vocal power and polished playing, which climaxed with an inspired cover of Led Zeppelin's 'Whole Lotta Love', got the punters rocking." Hannah told Colman, "It was a bit overwhelming", while Amy admitted, "I almost cried when I got on stage."

Earlier in June 2011, Stonefield had performed at the Melbourne Cricket Ground, providing pre-match entertainment at an Australian Football League match (Geelong vs. Hawthorn), celebrating "Women's Round". The group provided a cover version of Steppenwolf's "Magic Carpet Ride" for Triple J's Like a Version radio segment, which was compiled on the various-artists album Triple J's Like a Version 7 (November 2011). In the following month, Amy appeared on TV celebrity quiz show RocKwiz, performing "Through the Clover", backed by the RocKwiz OrKestra, and then singing a duet with Nick Barker on a cover version of Small Faces' "Itchycoo Park".

Stonefield's second EP, Bad Reality, appeared in May 2012; it reached the top 100 on the ARIA Albums Chart. Alex Rappel of FasterLouder observed, "[they] certainly know how to rock out in the style of old, and Richie Blackmore and Co would no doubt be impressed by Stonefield's offerings... [they] do not try to offer social commentary or sage wisdom in their latest EP Bad Reality, but rather a rock record that will melt your face off!"

The group released their debut self-titled album on 11 October 2013. It peaked at No. 21. It was recorded at Sing Sing Studios, Richmond, where it was produced and engineered by Ian Davenport for Illusive Sounds. Beat Magazine's Krissi Weiss opined, "[the group] has definitely progressed. It's more nuanced[;] they've evolved beyond being simply riff-based and their harmonic depth is almost transcendental... you can tell none of that was planned. As the listener you can't help but go searching for the familiar[,] but the band are at all times just being [themselves]." They supported its release with a tour of Victoria and parts of New South Wales.

Stonefield released the album's second single, "Love You Deserve", in October 2013, which Tobias Handke of Indie Shuffle described as "Classic guitar riffs and pounding percussion merge with the sisters' evocative harmonies, making [it] an easy highlight from [the album]. Oh yeah, how good is The Doors-esque organ?" It won the Rock Work of the Year category at the APRA Music Awards of 2015. The band mostly write their own original material but also do occasional cover versions. These include "Whole Lotta Love" and "Magic Carpet Ride". In 2015, they covered Fleetwood Mac's "The Chain" on Katie Noonan's album Songs That Made Me. In 2016, they toured in support of Fleetwood Mac in Australia for three shows.

The group's second album, As Above, So Below, appeared in July 2016 and peaked at No. 19, their highest-charting release to date. Jaymz Clements of Rolling Stone (Australia) rated it at four out of five stars. TheMusic.com.au's Bryget Chrisfield gave it 3.5 stars and explained, "[it] surpasses all preconceived notions of the sonic terrain these rockin' sisters can effortlessly traverse. Don't freak out, though. The band's killer riffs and headbanging opps prevail."

On 11 December 2017, the band signed with the Flightless record label and debuted their new song, "Delusion", on Triple J. In 2018, they toured nationally with Black Rebel Motorcycle Club. The quartet's third album, Far from Earth, was issued in April 2018 and reached the top 100. Libby Webster of The Austin Chronicle rated it 2.5 stars and explained, "[the group] trudges along haltingly, a chaos of genre. Hammering prog ('Far from Earth') and blistering doom metal ('Through the Storm'), their momentum wanes with milder moments of psychedelia." Happy Mag placed the album at no.16 on their list of "The 25 best psychedelic rock albums of the 2010s" in 2019.

L.A. Record's Madison Desler, who caught their gig at Los Angeles' The Bootleg club in that same month, opined that "they bashed through cuts off their new album, Far from Earth. 'Delusion', a mix of distorted psych and stormy desert rock[,] had drummer and lead singer Amy Findlay showing off her impressive vocals, while the dark, dance beat of 'Visions' got the packed crowd to shimmy and slide."

In 2019, the Australian band King Gizzard and the Lizard Wizard brought along Stonefield and the band Orb as support acts. Stonefield also appears in King Gizzard's concert film Chunky Shrapnel in 2020, playing the song "A Brief History of Planet Earth".

Amy Cavanagh, Stonefield's drummer, is married to Michael Cavanagh, the drummer for King Gizzard and the Lizard Wizard. She contributed drums to the track "Persistence" from King Gizzard's 2022 album Omnium Gatherum.

On March 18, 2020, the band performed live at Audiotree, with the recording of their show later being released as an EP on Bandcamp.

== Members ==
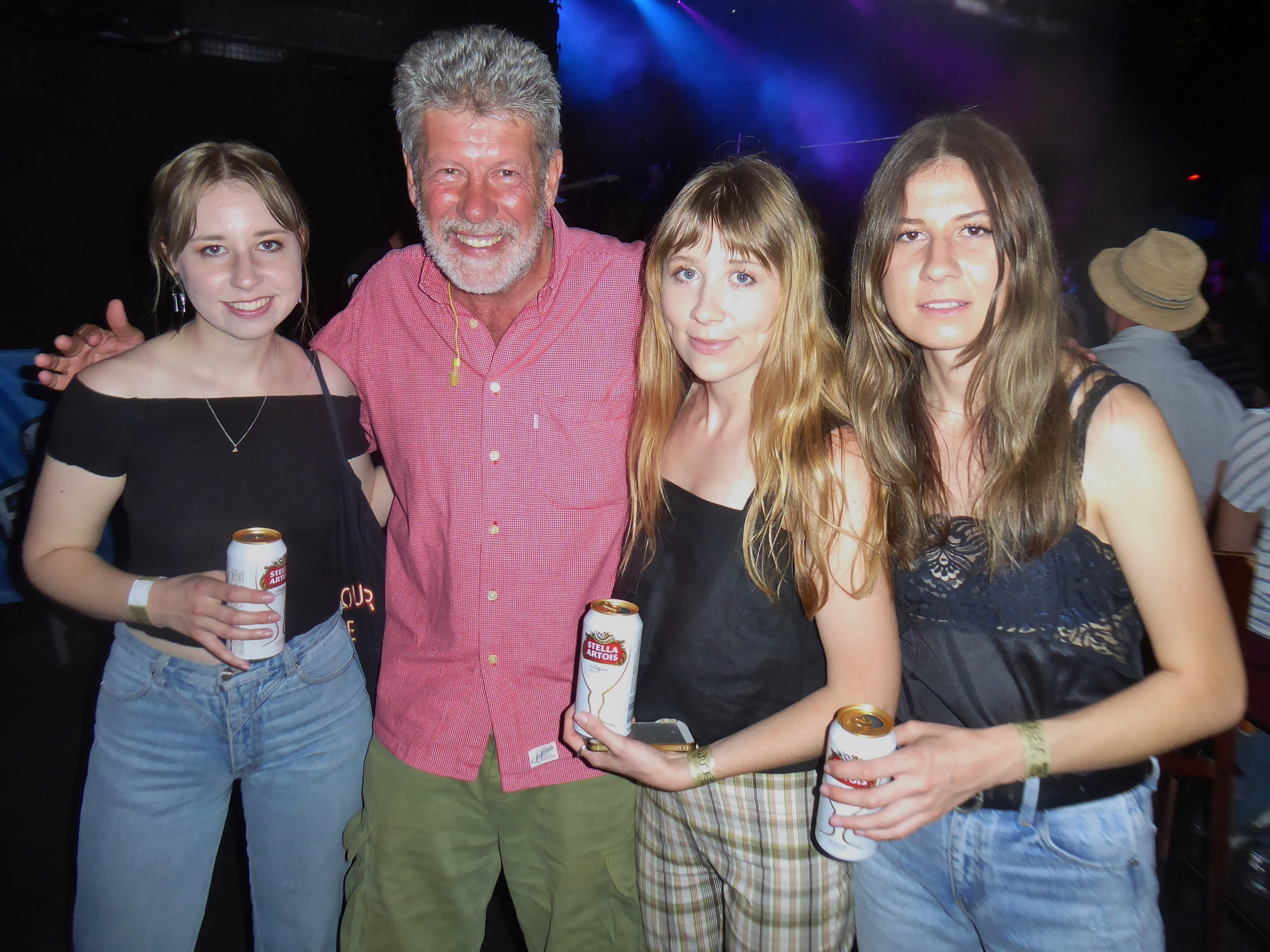
Left to right: Amy Findlay, John Harvey Pegg, Sarah Findlay, Hannah Findlay, at the Bristol Psych fest, 2018.

- Amy Cavanagh (née Findlay) – vocals, drums (2006–present)
- Hannah Findlay – guitar (2006–present)
- Holly Findlay – bass guitar (2006–present)
- Sarah Findlay – keyboards, vocals (2006–present)

== Discography ==
=== Studio albums ===
Year	Title	Details	Peak chart positions
Year	Title	Details	AUS
2013	Stonefield	Released: 11 October 2013; Label: Illusive Sounds, Wunderkind (ILL102CD); Formats: CD	21
2016	As Above, So Below	Released: 15 July 2016; Label: Illusive Sounds, Wunderkind; Formats: CD, LP	19
2018	Far from Earth	Released: 13 April 2018; Label: Flightless (FLT-038); Formats: CD, LP	61
2019	Bent	Released: 14 June 2019; Label: Flightless (FLT-052); Formats: CD, LP, digital	— (Note: Bent did not enter the ARIA Albums Chart, but peaked at number 50 on the ARIA Digital Album Chart.)

=== Extended plays ===
Year	Title	Details	Peak chart positions
Year	Title	Details	AUS
2010	Through the Clover	Released: November 2010; Label: Shock Records (SF01); Formats: CD	—
2012	Bad Reality	Released: 14 May 2012; Label: Wunderkind, Illusive Sounds (ILL063CD); Formats: CD	71
2020	Stonefield on Audiotree Live	Released: 18 March 2020; Label: Audiotree; Formats: Bandcamp	—

=== Singles ===
Year	Title	Album
2011	"Black Water Rising"	Bad Reality
2012	"Bad Reality"	Bad Reality
2013	"Put Your Curse on Me"	Stonefield
2013	"Love You Deserve"	Stonefield
2015	"Golden Dream"	—N/a
2016	"Stranger"	As Above, So Below
2018	"Delusion"	Far From Earth
2018	"Far From Earth"	Far From Earth

== Awards ==
=== AIR Awards ===
The Australian Independent Record Awards (commonly known informally as AIR Awards) is an annual awards night to recognise, promote and celebrate the success of Australia's Independent Music sector.

Year	Nominee / work	Award	Result
2011	Through the Clover	Best Independent Single/EP	Nominated

=== APRA Awards ===
The APRA Awards are presented annually from 1982 by the Australasian Performing Right Association (APRA), "honouring composers and songwriters". They commenced in 1982.

Year	Nominee / work	Award	Result	Ref.
2013	"Bad Reality" (Amy, Hannah, Sarah and Holly Findlay)	Song of the Year	Shortlisted	

=== J Award ===
The J Awards are an annual series of Australian music awards that were established by the Australian Broadcasting Corporation's youth-focused radio station Triple J. They commenced in 2005.

Year	Nominee / work	Award	Result
2010	themselves	Unearthed Artist of the Year	Nominated

=== Music Victoria Awards ===
The Music Victoria Awards are an annual awards night celebrating Victorian music. They commenced in 2006.

Year	Nominee / work	Award	Result	Ref.
2014	Stonefield	Best Regional Act	Nominated	
2018	Stonefield	Best Regional Act/Outer Suburban Act	Nominated	
2019	Stonefield	Best Regional Act/Outer Suburban Act	Nominated	
2019	Bent	Best Rock/Punk Album	Nominated	
