= Up Jumped the Boogie =

Single by Bliss n Eso

from the album Day of the Dog
- Released: 26 January 2006
- Genre: Hip hop
- Length: 4:11
- Label: Illusive Sounds
- Songwriter: Jonathon Notley and Max MacKinnon
- Producer: DJ Hoppa

Bliss n Eso singles chronology
"Up Jumped the Boogie" (2006)	"Party at My Place" (2006)

"Up Jumped the Boogie" is the debut single by Australian hip hop trio Bliss n Eso. It was released 26 January 2006 through Illusive Sounds as the first single from the trio's second studio album Day of the Dog. The song peaked at No. 56 on the ARIA Singles Chart. An additional EP of the song was released containing other tracks from Day of the Dog.

== Samples ==
The song samples "One Man's Ceiling Is Another Man's Floor" by Paul Simon.

== Track listing ==
CD Single/EP
No.	Title	Length
1.	"Up Jumped the Boogie"	4:11
2.	"Up Jumped the Boogie" (Radio Edit)	3:18
3.	"Party At My Place"	4:21
4.	"Them Boys"	3:38

== Reception ==
Reception to the song was positive, OzHipHop.com wrote "Lead single ‘Up Jumped the Boogie’ is a great head-nodding anthem".

== Chart performance ==
The debuted at No. 56 on the ARIA Singles Chart. It spent a total of six weeks in the top 100.

== Charts ==
Chart (2006)	Peak position
Australia (ARIA)	56
Australian Urban (ARIA)	16
