= Sunlight (Bag Raiders song) =

Single by Bag Raiders

from the album Bag Raiders
- Released: November 2010
- Length: 4:03
- Label: Modular Recordings
- Songwriters: Jack Glass; Chris Stracey
- Producer: Bag Raiders

Bag Raiders singles chronology
"Way Back Home" (2010)	"Sunlight" (2010)	"Not Over" (2011)

Music video
- "Sunlight" on YouTube

"Sunlight" is a song by Australian electronic duo Bag Raiders. The song was released in November 2010 as the second single from their self-title debut album Bag Raiders. The song peaked at number 84 on the ARIA Charts and was certified gold.

At the APRA Music Awards of 2012, the song was nominated for Dance Work of the Year.

== Track listing ==
Australian CD single (Modular Recordings)

1. "Sunlight" (radio edit) – 3:23
2. "Sunlight" (Armand Van Helden remix edit) – 3:47
3. "Sunlight" (Armand Van Helden remix) – 5:16
4. "Sunlight" (Tie Dye remix) – 5:28
5. "Sunlight" (Gloves remix) – 5:25

== Charts ==
Chart (2010)	Peak position
Australia (ARIA)	84

== Certifications ==
Region	Certification	Certified units/sales
Australia (ARIA)	Gold	35,000^{‡}
^{‡} Sales+streaming figures based on certification alone.
