= Home Is Where the Heart Is (song) =

Single by Bliss N Eso

from the album Circus in the Sky
- Released: 10 May 2013
- Recorded: 2013
- Genre: Hip hop
- Length: 3:30
- Label: Illusive Sounds
- Songwriter: Bliss and Eso

Bliss N Eso singles chronology
"House of Dreams" (2013)	"Home Is Where the Heart Is" (2013)	"Reservoir Dogs" (2013)

'Home Is Where the Heart Is' is a song by Australian hip hop trio Bliss n Eso, released through Illusive Sounds as the second single from their fifth studio album Circus in the Sky on 10 May 2013. The song describes the formation of the trio when they were in high school, and the things in life they enjoy. The song debuted and peaked at No. 31 on the ARIA Singles Chart and spent 4 weeks on the chart. "Home Is Where the Heart Is" poled at No. 135 on the Triple J Hottest 100 for 2013.

== Content ==
In the first verse, Bliss describes his life at school, and his friendship with Eso, referencing Ice Cube, Eddie Murphy and Public Enemy, and the overall formation of the Bliss n Eso trio with DJ Izm. In the second verse Eso describes waking up spending the day with his girlfriend, where they, smoke weed, listen to music, drive, walk their dogs and rap.

== Music video ==
The song's accompanying music video was uploaded to Bliss n Eso's YouTube channel on 10 June 2013 and spans a total of 4 minutes and twenty four seconds. The music video begins with separate clips of the trio playing as children. Then Bliss is seen walking into school while clips of Bliss and Eso rapping from around their formation are shown. During Eso's verse he spends the day with his girlfriend, at the end of the verse there is footage of Eso proposing to her onstage.

== Charts ==
Charts (2013)	Peak position
Australia (ARIA)	31

== Certifications ==
Certifications for "Home Is Where the Heart Is"
Region	Certification	Certified units/sales
Australia (ARIA)	Gold	35,000^{‡}
^{‡} Sales+streaming figures based on certification alone.
