= Way Back Home (Bag Raiders song) =

Single by Bag Raiders

from the album Bag Raiders
- Released: August 2010
- Length: 4:14
- Label: Modular Recordings
- Songwriters: Jack Glass; Chris Stracey
- Producer: Bag Raiders

Bag Raiders singles chronology
"Shooting Stars" (2009)	"Way Back Home" (2010)	"Sunlight" (2010)

Music video
- "Way Back Home" on YouTube

"Way Back Home" is a song by Australian electronic duo Bag Raiders. The song was released in August 2010 as the lead single from their self-title debut album Bag Raiders. The song peaked at number 68 on the ARIA Charts and was voted number 46 in the Triple J Hottest 100, 2010.

== Track listing ==
Australian CD single (Modular Recordings – MODDIGBR001)

1. "Way Back Home" - 4:12
2. "Way Back Home" (Club Version) (featuring Duane Harden) - 5:17
3. "Way Back Home" (Harvard Bass Remix) -5:52

== Charts ==
=== Weekly charts ===
Chart (2010–2011)	Peak position
Australia (ARIA)	68
Austria (Ö3 Austria Top 40)	31
Germany (GfK)	17

=== Year-end charts ===
Chart (2011)	Position
Germany (Official German Charts)	66

== Certifications ==
Region	Certification	Certified units/sales
Germany (BVMI)	Gold	150,000^{^}
^{^} Shipments figures based on certification alone.
