= Dynamite (Asta song) =

Single by Asta featuring Allday
- Released: March 2015
- Length: 3:57
- Label: Warner Music Australia
- Songwriters: Asta Binnie-Ireland, Tomas Gaynor, Andrew Klippel

Asta featuring Allday singles chronology
| "I Need Answers" (2013) | "Dynamite" (2015) | "Wild Emotion" (2016) |

Allday singles chronology
| "Wolves" (2014) | "Dynamite" (2015) | "Grammy" (2015) |

"Dynamite" is a song by Australian singer song-writer, Asta featuring Australian rapper, Allday. It was released in March 2015. and peaked at number 66 on the ARIA Charts in May 2015.

Asta told The Guardian in May 2015, "The song was finished, I'd recorded my verses and I heard Allday on the radio and thought he would fit really well with the whole vibe of the song. We sent it to him and he did it overnight."

In May 2015, Asta and AllDay performed "Dyanmite" and a over of Whitney Houston's "I Wanna Dance with Somebody (Who Loves Me)".

Asta promoted the single with Dynamite tour around Australia June through August 2015 with Asta saying "I love performing because I can do whatever I want to do. Being on stage is just the best thing ever about the whole thing, I see myself as more of a performer-singer than a musician really."

The song was voted number 47 on the Triple J Hottest 100, 2015.

== Reception ==
Hayden Davies from The Music called it a "bouncy, creamy pop song". Davies said "Allday adds an interesting dynamic to what would otherwise be a straight-out pop single that takes influence from the increasing merging of dance and hip hop... And it's all wrapped around a bounding bass line and chunks of piano that has a catchy atmosphere which is sure to bounce around in your head for days."

Staff Writers from Scenestr called it an "80s-drenched collaboration".

== Track listing ==
digital single

1. "Dynamite" - 3:57

Remixes - digital single

1. "Dynamite" (original - edit) - 3:00
2. "Dynamite" (Flashback remix) - 5:19
3. "Dynamite" (Porsches remix) - 3:34

== Charts ==
Weekly chart performance for "Dynamite"
| Chart (2015) | Peak position |
|---|---|
| Australia (ARIA) | 66 |
