= Bullet and a Target =

Song by Australian hip hop trio Bliss n Eso

Single by Bliss n Eso

from the album Flying Colours
- Released: 27 October 2007
- Recorded: 2007
- Genre: Hip hop
- Length: 4:21
- Label: Illusive Sounds
- Songwriter: Jonathon Notley and Max MacKinnon

Bliss n Eso singles chronology
"Coppin' It Sweet"/"Blazin'" (2007)	"Bullet and a Target" (2007)	"Woodstock 2008" (2008)

"Bullet and a Target" is a song by Australian hip hop trio Bliss n Eso, with featured vocals from Connections Zulu Choir. The song was released as the lead single from the trio's third studio album Flying Colours on 27 October 2007. Their version of Bullet and a Target was inspired by the living conditions Bliss, Eso, and Izm had witnessed when visiting South Africa in 2007. Bullet and a Target peaked at No. 43 on the ARIA Singles Chart, making it their first top 50 single and second top 100 single.

== Content ==
The song is about Bliss n Eso's experience observing the poverty during their trip to Africa in 2007. It is a reworking of Citizen Cope's "Bullet and a Target".

== Background ==
Bliss n Eso were invited to South Africa by The Oaktree Foundation alongside Evermore to show the situation in Africa to the Australian public. Bliss n Eso stayed in South Africa for ten days and shot the song's music video during their stay. Speaking of the experience in Africa, Eso said "You could be strong, thick skinned, but everyone had to have a moment where they had to be by themselves and sit down in the car and soak in what was going on". Bliss n Eso donated 100% of profits raised by the song to help poverty stricken communities in South Africa.

== Music video ==
The music video was shot during Bliss n Eso's ten-day stay in Africa. It features Bliss n Eso rapping the song as they walk through African neighborhoods, and the Connections Zulu Choir and other Africans singing the chorus. The music video has around 600,000 views on YouTube and 300,000 in another upload.

== Critical reception ==
The song received a highly positive reception. Polaroidsofandroids.com wrote "However, this album isn't without its pleasurable moments. The lead single, Bullet and a Target, recorded with a 20-piece Zulu choir, is maybe the best 'get up, stand up' Australian hip-hop song that The Herd never recorded."

== Track listing ==
CD Single/digital Download
No.	Title	Length
1.	"Bullet and a Target" (Radio Edit)	3:39
2.	"Bullet and a Target"	4:21
3.	"Bullet and a Target" (Acoustic Edit)	3:58

== Charts ==
Charts (2007)	Peak position
Australia (ARIA)	43
