= Shooting Stars (Bag Raiders song) =

Single by Bag Raiders

from the album Turbo Love! and Bag Raiders
- Released: 7 August 2009
- Recorded: 2007–2008
- Genre: Dance-pop; synth-pop; deep house; disco
- Length: 3:47
- Label: Modular
- Songwriters: Jack Glass; Chris Stracey
- Producer: Bag Raiders

Bag Raiders singles chronology
"Turbo Love!" (2008)	"Shooting Stars" (2009)	"Way Back Home" (2010)

Music video
- "Shooting Stars" on YouTube

"Shooting Stars" is a song by Australian electronic duo Bag Raiders. The song was originally featured on the band's EP, Turbo Love, which released on October 8, 2008. The band signed with Modular Recordings in June 2009 and "Shooting Stars" was released in August 2009. The song peaked at number 62 on the ARIA charts and was voted number 18 in the Triple J Hottest 100, 2009. In 2025, it placed 46 in the Triple J Hottest 100 of Australian Songs. The song was certified platinum in Australia in 2021. The song is sung by Rhys Taylor.

In 2013, "Shooting Stars" was used on Australia's Got Talent by contestant Tommy Franklin, which led to the song re-entered the ARIA charts and peaking at number 38.

The song received international attention in February 2017 when the song became a part of a popular Internet meme, thus cementing the track's legacy as a sleeper hit. The song reached number 11 on Billboard's Dance/Electronic Songs chart and number 9 on the Billboard Bubbling Under chart that year.

In 2015, the song was listed at number 29 in In the Mix's '100 Greatest Australian Dance Tracks of All Time' with Dave Ruby Howe saying "[it] was a bright, euphoric tonic ... with an instantly-classic chorus".

== Background ==
In an interview with The Sydney Morning Herald, Jack Glass, a member of the band, said that the single inspired him to create their self-titled album, claiming that "people loved Shooting Stars so much and we liked that direction of songwriting and developing a pop sensibility ourselves, too." Glass also said that the band also played half of the song in clubs before the band had realized that "people liked it and wanted to hear the whole thing."

== Composition ==
The first part of the song is composed in E Lydian, and the second part is composed in G♯ minor – both of which are modes of the tonic key of B major – and maintains a tempo of 125 BPM for the entire song. The song's chorus is only played at the end of the song. The bass player is switched between the two band members in the verse and chorus.

== Reception ==
"Shooting Stars" was well received by music critics. Andrew Murfett of The Sydney Morning Herald described the song as "peppy track" and compared the song to works of Daft Punk.

== 2016 and 2017 revival ==
After the death of Harambe the gorilla in May 2016, an animated tribute featuring the song, using clips from Ego's music video for "The Crazy Things We Do", spread on the internet.

In 2017, the song received greater international attention when the song became a part of a popular internet meme. The video that boosted the popularity of the meme was an upload on Reddit titled "Fat man does amazing dive". In the meme, the song is usually accompanied with people falling with surreal, spacey backgrounds. Chris Stracey, a member of the band, reacted to the meme, saying "At first we were like, ok this is funny I guess, but I didn't really get it so I thought "alright whatever". Once I started seeing a common theme though, such as the big guy jumping off the bridge into the river, that was the first one of the more recent stuff that really got me. So good! That and the Lady Gaga one is so funny" [referring to a mashup with Gaga's performance during the Super Bowl LI halftime].

The song and its corresponding meme was later featured in the music video for the Katy Perry and Nicki Minaj song "Swish Swish".

New York Magazine referred to the meme as the "first big post-Vine meme." Meanwhile, Daily Dot compared the meme to Neil Cicierega's 2010 viral video, Brodyquest.

On 6 December 2017, "Shooting Stars" (along with the popular meme associated within the song) was featured in YouTube Rewind: The Shape of 2017.

== Track listing ==
12" maxi

1. "Shooting Stars" – 3:55
2. "Shooting Stars" (Siriusmo Remix) – 5:30
3. "Shooting Stars" (Kris Menace Remix) – 7:29
4. "Shooting Stars" (In Flagranti Remix) – 6:38

== Covers ==
The song was first covered by Hidden Cat in 2009. The song was later covered by American progressive house producer Elephante in 2014. In 2020, Australian producer POOLCLVB and singer MARSHES officially released a cover of the song, although this cover was first uploaded to YouTube in 2015.

In November 2022, Australian DJ, Flume and American singer, Toro y Moi covered the song for Triple J.

In September 2023, Australian singer Troye Sivan released his song "Got Me Started", which samples the song's melody.

== Charts ==
=== Weekly charts ===
Chart (2009–2010)	Peak position
Australia (ARIA)	62
Australia Dance (ARIA)	12

Chart (2013)	Peak position
Australia (ARIA)	38
Australia Dance (ARIA)	6

Chart (2017–2019)	Peak position
Austria (Ö3 Austria Top 40)	56
Canada Hot 100 (Billboard)	88
France (SNEP)	93
Germany (GfK)	55
UK Singles (Official Charts)	83
US Bubbling Under Hot 100 (Billboard)	9
US Hot Dance/Electronic Songs (Billboard)	11

=== Year-end charts ===
Chart (2009)	Position
Australian Artist Singles (ARIA)	43
Hottest 100 (Triple J)	18

Chart (2017)	Position
US Hot Dance/Electronic Songs (Billboard)	35

== Certifications ==
Region	Certification	Certified units/sales
Australia (ARIA)	4× Platinum	280,000^{‡}
Brazil (Pro-Música Brasil)	Gold	30,000^{‡}
Germany (BVMI)	Gold	200,000^{‡}
New Zealand (RMNZ)	Platinum	30,000^{‡}
United Kingdom (BPI)	Silver	200,000^{‡}
United States (RIAA)	Platinum	1,000,000^{‡}
^{‡} Sales+streaming figures based on certification alone.

== Use in other media ==
The song was featured during the end credits of Season 1, Episode 6 of the 2010 HBO series How to Make It in America. In 2011, Madeon featured the song in his mashup, "Pop Culture". The song was also featured on the soundtrack to NBA 2K16, in the playlist "Around the World". It was also featured on the soundtrack of NBA 2K26 as part of the "Greatest Hits Soundtrack". The song was also featured in Sony Pictures Animation's Animated sports comedy Goat.
