= Running on Air =

Studio album by Bliss n Eso
- Released: 30 July 2010
- Recorded: The Devils Playground and Sing Sing Studios, Melbourne
- Genre: Hip-hop
- Label: Illusive Sounds/Liberation Music
- Producer: Jonathon Notley, Hattori Hunzo

Bliss n Eso chronology
Flying Colours (2008)	Running on Air (2010)	Circus in the Sky (2013)

Singles from Running on Air
- 1. "Down by the River" Released: 14 May 2010; 2. "Addicted" Released: 30 July 2010; 3. "Reflections" Released: 17 December 2010; 4. "Coastal Kids" Released: 2011

Professional ratings
Review scores
Source	Rating
AllMusic	3.5/5 stars

Running on Air is the fourth studio album by the Australian hip-hop trio Bliss n Eso. It was released on 30 July 2010. The album debuted at No. 1 in Australia. It has been certified Platinum by ARIA.

At the J Awards of 2010, the album was nominated for Australian Album of the Year.

At the 2010 ARIA Music Awards, the album was nominated for Best Urban Album.

== Track listing ==
1. "Never Land" – 2:10 (Skit) (features a sample from the 1960 film The Fugitive Kind)
2. "Flying Through the City" – 3:17 (Prod. M-Phazes & Bliss)
3. "Addicted" – 3:51 (Prod. Hattori Hunzo)
4. "Down by the River" – 2:54 (Prod. Hattori Hunzo)
5. "The Moses Twist" – 4:16 (Prod. Hattori Hunzo)
6. "Art House Audio" – 3:02 (Prod. M-Phazes & Bliss)
7. "Family Affair" – 3:56 (Prod. Hattori Hunzo)
8. "Reflections" – 3:05 (Prod. Hattori Hunzo)
9. "Coastal Kids" – 3:57 (Prod. Bonobo)
10. "People Up on It" (featuring Xzibit) – 4:26 (Prod. Hattori Hunzo)
11. "Caught at the Pub" – 2:05 (Skit)
12. "Where the Wild Things Are" (featuring Mind Over Matter) – 4:12 (Prod. Hattori Hunzo)
13. "The Children of the Night" – 4:47 (Prod. M-Phazes & Bliss)
14. "Smoke Like a Fire" (featuring RZA) – 3:52 (Prod. Hattori Hunzo)
15. "Re-Debating Reality" – 0:51 (Skit)
16. "Late One Night" – 3:42 (Prod. Hattori Hunzo) (features a sample of Rattlin' Bones by Kasey Chambers and Shane Nicholson)
17. "I Can" (featuring Jehst) – 4:13 (Prod. M-Phazes)
18. "Weightless Wings" – 3:29 (Prod. Matik)
19. "Golden Years" – 2:58 (Prod. Hattori Hunzo, co-prod. Bliss)

== Charts ==
=== Weekly charts ===
Chart (2010-2011)	Peak position
Australian Albums (ARIA)	1

=== Year-end charts ===
Chart (2010)	Position
Australian Albums (ARIA)	37
Chart (2011)	Position
Australian Albums (ARIA)	74

== See also ==
- List of number-one albums of 2010 (Australia)

== Release history ==
Region	Date	Format	Edition(s)	Label	Catalogue
Australia	30 July 2010	CD; digital download	Standard edition	Illusive Sounds	ILL034CD/ ILL042CD
