= Far from Earth =

Studio album by Stonefield
- Released: April 13, 2018
- Recorded: 2016–2018
- Studio: Ultrasound Studios
- Genre: Psych-rock
- Length: 39:43
- Label: Flightless
- Producer: Stephen McBean

Stonefield chronology
As Above, So Below (2016)	Far from Earth (2018)	Bent (2019)

Far from Earth is the third studio album by Australian rock band Stonefield, released on April 13, 2018.

== Background ==
Far from Earth was heavily influenced by psychedelic and rock legends of the 1970s. Influences from Black Sabbath and Led Zeppelin, to Rush and The Rolling Stones where noted as present in the album. This was the first Stonefield album to be released on the Flightless label. On June 20, 2018, the band released a behind the scenes documentary of the making of the album.

One of the tracks, Through the Storm was released as a 7" single as promotion for the album. Besides being released on a new label, the band also experimented with recording in a new studio with a new producer; Stephen McBean of Black Mountain. The album was released on April 13, 2018.

== Reception ==
The album was described as "hammering prog" with "blistering doom metal" by The Austin Chronicle but that "their momentum wanes with milder moments of psychedelia" giving it 2-and-a-half stars out of five. Atwood Magazine gave a retrospective on the album after the release of their following album Bent, comparing Far from Earth to a fine wine that improved with age. ThePyschRock gave the album a 7 out of 10, calling it "fuzzed out" and "dynamic" and "a good album with high production value." ThePyschRock docked points for "too much pop" and "not enough experimentation."

== Track listing ==
Every member of stonefield has a writing credit on the album, which was produced by Stephen McBean of Black Mountain, mixed by Claudius Mittendorfer, and was recorded at Ultrasound Studios in Los Angeles.

Far from Earth track listing
No.	Title	Length
1.	"Delusion"	4:34
2.	"Far from Earth"	3:39
3.	"In the Eve"	3:56
4.	"Visions"	3:29
5.	"Together"	3:06
6.	"Broken Stone"	5:47
7.	"Through the Storm"	4:20
8.	"In My Head"	3:34
9.	"Sleepyhead"	3:55
10.	"Celestial Spaces"	3:23
Total length:		39:43
