= Bent (Stonefield album) =

Studio album by Stonefield
- Released: June 14, 2019
- Recorded: 2018–2019
- Genre: Psych-rock
- Length: 32:59
- Label: Flightless

Stonefield chronology
Far from Earth (2018)	Bent (2019)	Stonefield on Audiotree Live (2020)

Bent (stylized BENT) is the fourth studio album by Australian rock band Stonefield, released on June 14, 2019.

== Background ==
The album was announced on April 30, 2019, alongside the release of the song "Sleep" as a promotional single. Amy, the drummer, said that the album was "inspired by the concept of floating in the in-between" and was "an ode to the darkness of not wanting to cross to the other side." The album was conceived during the band's 2018 tour of the United States, and released shortly before Stonefield travelled to North America as the opening act to King Gizzard and the Lizard Wizard. The album was released on June 14, 2019.

== Reception ==
Impose described the album as "a doomier slice of tunes" when compared to their earlier albums with "heavier grooves and decidedly more ominous vibes." The Austin Chronicle gave the album four out of five stars, calling it a "showcase [of] the natural majesty and brute force of hard rock." The Music gave Bent two-and-a-half stars out of 3, calling it "more substantial than its half-hour runtime might suggest" saying Amy’s vocals are a highlight.

== Track listing ==
Bent track listing
No.	Title	Length
1.	"Sleep"	4:08
2.	"Dog Eat Dog"	3:06
3.	"Dead Alive"	3:20
4.	"People"	3:59
5.	"Route 29"	2:59
6.	"66"	3:34
7.	"If I Die"	3:30
8.	"Dignity"	1:18
9.	"Shutdown"	2:53
10.	"Woman"	4:12
Total length:		32:59
