= Be Like You =

Single by Esoterik and James Crook featuring Asta

from the album My Astral Plane
- Released: 12 October 2017
- Length: 3:48
- Label: Flight Deck, Illusive Sounds
- Songwriters: Max Mackinnon, Luke Rundle
- Producers: Luke Rundle, Jon Reichardt

Esoterik singles chronology
"Sunny Days" (2015)	"Be Like You" (2017)	"Bless Up" (2018)

Asta singles chronology
"Never Wanted That" (2017)	"Be Like You" (2017)	"Want You to Know" (2019)

"Be Like You" is a song by Australian hip-hop artist Esoterik and Australian producer James Crooks featuring Australian singer Asta. It was released on 12 October 2017 as the lead single from Esoterik's debut extended play, My Astral Plane.

Upon release, Esoterik said "The lyrics for 'Be Like You' allow me to express my love for the new worlds I have found since giving up my 10 year battle with alcohol. At first I thought I was talking to myself through the song, but after a few listens I realised that the lyrics could easily be about anyone who might be struggling with their own addictions, and in turn this could be a letter to them." James Crooks had written the hook in the chorus before sharing a snippet on his Instagram with Esoterik reaching out. Esoterik elaborated "The production was so fresh, tropical and feel-good that I was immediately attached. The hook James Crooks had written strongly resonated with me. Within a couple of days we connected and started working to build his original idea into something really special."

== Track listing ==
digital single

1. "Be Like You" - 3:48

digital single

1. "Be Like You" (KLP remix) - 5:40

== Certifications ==
Region	Certification	Certified units/sales
Australia (ARIA)	Gold	35,000^{‡}
^{‡} Sales+streaming figures based on certification alone.
