= Reservoir Dogs (song) =

Single by Bliss N Eso

from the album Circus in the Sky
- Released: 21 June 2013
- Recorded: 2013
- Genre: Hip hop
- Length: 4:13
- Label: Illusive Sounds
- Songwriter: Bliss and Eso

Bliss n Eso singles chronology
"Home Is Where The Heart Is" (2013)	"Reservoir Dogs" (2013)	"Act your Age" (2013)

Seth Sentry singles chronology
"Dear Science" (2012)	"Reservoir Dogs" (2013)	"Run" (2014)

360 singles chronology
"Run Alone" (2012)	"Reservoir Dogs" (2013)	"Impossible" (2014)

Pez singles chronology
"The Game" (2012)	"Reservoir Dogs" (2013)	"One Life" (2013)

Drapht singles chronology
"1990's" (2012)	"Reservoir Dogs" (2013)	"Dancin' John Doe" (2015)

"Reservoir Dogs" is a song by Australian hip hop trio Bliss n Eso, featuring Seth Sentry, Pez, 360 and Drapht. The song was released on 21 June 2013 through Illusive Sounds, as the third single from Circus in the Sky. The song peaked at No. 96 on the ARIA Singles Chart and finished at No. 123 on the Triple J Hottest 100 of 2013.

== Background ==
Bliss, Eso, 360, Pez, Drapht, and Seth Sentry wrote the song over a group e-mail and later recorded it together. When speaking of the other rappers writing their verses, Eso said "We left it up to their own interpretation, we didn't say (to them) 'Alright the song's about this', we wanted all the boys to jump on and put their own spice to it". Bliss said that the idea behind the 'Reservoir Dogs' title came from '6 MC's on the track, and the movie Reservoir Dogs is about 6 individuals all with a different colour, so we based it on that with everyone just coming together with their own colour". Bliss n Eso also had plans for a music video, however one would never be released, this is perhaps due to the track's poor chart performance in comparison to other singles from Circus in the Sky.

== Critical reception ==
The song was positively received, however some lyrics were criticized. Beat.com.au wrote that "Australian heavyweights 360, Pez, Seth Sentry and Drapht sound like they’re having a blast together on record for the first time on Reservoir Dogs". TheMusic.com.au wrote that "They’re executing a roll call of some of the biggest rappers in Australia. The track bounces along with a real sense of urgency, as well as camaraderie among the merry men. Lacklustre hook aside, it’s exciting stuff." Moshtix.com.au wrote that the song was "another jaunty highlight though marred by some haphazard lyrical missteps".

== Chart performance ==
The song debuted at No. 96 on the ARIA Singles Chart. It dropped one spot to No. 97 the following week and left the chart after 2 weeks.

== Charts ==
Charts (2013)	Peak position
Australia (ARIA)	96

== Certifications ==
Region	Certification	Certified units/sales
Australia (ARIA)	Platinum	70,000^{‡}
^{‡} Sales+streaming figures based on certification alone.
