= Bag Raiders =

Australian electronic music duo

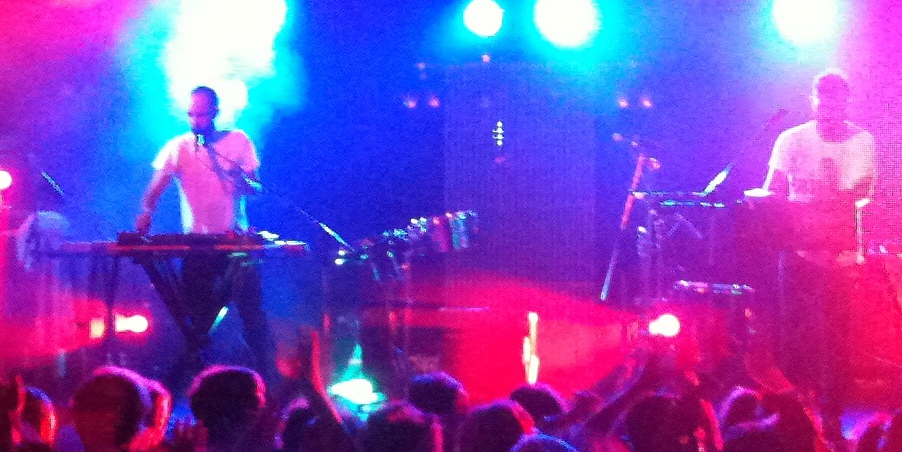
- Bag Raiders performing in December 2010

Background information
- Origin: Sydney, New South Wales, Australia
- Genres: Alternative dance; electronica; synthpop; indietronica; house
- Years active: 2006–present
- Labels: Bang Gang 12 Inches; Fool's Gold; Modular (2009)
- Members: Jack Glass; Chris Stracey
- Website: bagraiders.com

Bag Raiders are an Australian electronic music duo founded in 2006 by Jack Glass and Chris Stracey. They play keyboards, drums, and act as vocalists, producers, and remixers, with Stracey additionally playing guitar, violin and piano. They also write and produce other artists' work. In 2009, they were rated at number 11 on the Inthemix poll of Australia's top 50 DJs.

In October 2010, they released their self-titled debut album, which peaked at number 7 on the ARIA Albums Chart and received a J Award album of the year nomination. The album's song "Shooting Stars" renewed the band's popularity seven years after its release, when it began being used as part of a popular Internet meme.

== History ==
Both classically trained musicians, Jack Glass and Chris Stracey met in the Cranbrook School, Sydney orchestra practice room with Glass a year ahead playing piano and cello, and Stracey playing violin, guitar and clarinet. In 2005, the pair reconnected and started mixing hip-hop and 1970s rock music CDs, their musical inspirations include Earth, Wind & Fire, The Brothers Johnson, 808 State and Orbital. Bag Raiders as an alternative dance band was then founded in 2006.

The duo first gained traction in with the release of their October 2008 EP Turbo Love!. The EP's title track became one of the year's most played songs on Triple J, Australia's foremost national radio station. During this time Bag Raiders were making a slew of remixes some of which gained a lot of popularity on the internet. Their remix of "B.T.T.T.T.R.Y." by the artist K.I.M. ended up being included in the Grand Theft Auto IV soundtrack

In June 2009, Bag Raiders were signed to Modular. In August 2009, the released "Shooting Stars". It was listed at No. 18 in the Triple J Hottest 100 of 2009. This was followed by "Way Back Home" in August 2010.

In October 2010, Bag Raiders released their self-titled debut studio album, Bag Raiders. It peaked at number 7 on the ARIA Albums Chart. "Sunlight", was released to Australian radio in November 2010 and it peaked at No. 84 on the ARIA Top 100.

In 2011, "Way Back Home" peaked at number 17 on the official German Singles Chart on 6 June 2011 after being used in the German Vodafone TV advertisement

In August 2013, "Shooting Stars" re-entered the ARIA Singles Chart, reaching the top 50 at #38.

In 2017, "Shooting Stars" became popular again after being placed in an internet meme featuring people as well as animals falling with surreal, spacey backgrounds. The song's renewed popularity has since been acknowledged by the band itself.

In September 2019, Bag Raiders released their second studio album, Horizons.

== Discography ==
=== Studio albums ===
Title	Details	Peak chart positions	
Title	Details	AUS	GER
Bag Raiders	Released: 1 October 2010 (AU); Label: Modular (MODCD129); Formats: CD, digital download	7	36
Horizons	Released: 6 September 2019; Label: Modular, Universal; Formats: CD, digital download, 2×LP	— (Note: Horizons did not enter the ARIA Albums Chart, but peaked at number 43 on the ARIA Digital Album Chart.)	—

=== Extended plays ===
Title	Details
Bag Raiders	Released: June 2007 (AU); Label: Bang Gang 12 Inches (BANG004); Format: CD, LP, digital
Bag Raiders Remixed	Released: January 2008 (AU); Label: Bang Gang 12 Inches (BANG007); Format: Cdr, LP, digital
Turbo Love!	Released: 8 October 2008 (AU); Label: Bang Gang 12 Inches (BANG011); Format: CD, digital
Big Fun	Released: November 2009 (US); Label: Fool's Gold (FGR-023); Format: LP, digital
Nairobi/Savannah	Released: July 2014; Label: Modular (n/a); Format: digital
Waterfalls	Released: July 2015; Label: Modular (4744081); Format: LP, digital
Friend Inside	Released: December 2015; Label: Modular (4750882); Format: LP, digital
Checkmate	Released: March 2016; Label: Modular (4782154); Format: LP, digital

=== Singles ===
Title	Year	Peak chart positions									Certifications	Album
Title	Year	AUS	AUT	CAN	FRA	GER	NZ	UK	US Bub.	US Dance	Certifications	Album
"Fun Punch"	2007	—	—	—	—	—	—	—	—	—		Bag Raiders
"Turbo Love"	2008	—	—	—	—	—	—	—	—	—		Turbo Love!
"Shooting Stars"	2009	38	—	—	—	—	—	—	—	—	ARIA: 4× Platinum	Turbo Love!
"Way Back Home"	2010	68	31	—	—	17	—	—	—	—	BVMI: Gold	Bag Raiders
"Sunlight"	2010	84	—	—	—	—	—	—	—	—	ARIA: Gold	Bag Raiders
"Not Over"	2011	—	—	—	—	—	—	—	—	—		Bag Raiders
"Nairobi"	2014	—	—	—	—	—	—	—	—	—		Nairobi/Savannah
"Waterfalls"	2015	—	—	—	—	—	—	—	—	—		Waterfalls
"Checkmate" (featuring Benjamin Joseph)	2016	100	—	—	—	—	—	—	—	—		Checkmate
"Beat Me to the Punch" (featuring Mayer Hawthorne)	2016	—	—	—	—	—	—	—	—	—		Non-album singles
"Shooting Stars" (re-release)	2017	—	56	88	94	55	—	83	9	11	BPI: Silver; BVMI: Gold	Non-album singles
"Lightning" (featuring The Kite String Tangle)	2019	—	—	—	—	—	—	—	—	—		Horizons
"Wild at Heart" (featuring Mickey Kojak)	2019	—	—	—	—	—	—	—	—	—		Horizons
"How Long" (featuring Panama)	2019	—	—	—	—	—	—	—	—	—		Horizons
"UR Heart"	2022	—	—	—	—	—	—	—	—	—		Non-album singles
"Never Forget"	2022	—	—	—	—	—	—	—	—	—		Non-album singles
"Letting Go"	2022	—	—	—	—	—	—	—	—	—		Non-album singles
"Love Me Back"	2023	—	—	—	—	—	—	—	—	—		Non-album singles
"Right Here"/"Saliba"	2023	—	—	—	—	—	25	—	—	—		Non-album singles
"Save Me" (with Boston Bun)	2024	—	—	—	—	—	—	—	—	—		Non-album singles
"Flowers" (with Panama)	2024	—	—	—	—	—	—	—	—	—		Non-album singles
"Hold Me"	2025	—	—	—	—	—	—	—	—	—		Non-album singles
"Out of My Mind"	2026	—	—	—	—	—	—	—	—	—		Non-album singles
"Sunshine" (featuring XIRA)	2026	—	—	—	—	—	—	—	—	—		Non-album singles
"Break My Heart" (featuring Meg Mac)	2026	—	—	—	—	—	— (Note: "Break My Heart" did not enter the NZ Top 40 Singles Chart, but peaked at number 23 on the NZ Hot Singles Chart.)	—	—	—		Non-album singles
"Ur Type" (featuring Abby Bella May)	2026	—	—	—	—	—	—	—	—	—		Non-album singles

== Awards and nominations ==
=== ARIA Awards ===
The ARIA Music Awards are annual awards, which recognises excellence, innovation, and achievement across all genres of Australian music. They commenced in 1987.

Year	Nominee / work	Award	Result	Ref.
2011	Bag Raiders	Best Dance Release	Nominated	

=== APRA Awards ===
The APRA Awards are held in Australia and New Zealand by the Australasian Performing Right Association to recognise songwriting skills, sales and airplay performance by its members annually.

Year	Nominee / work	Award	Result	Ref.
2012	"Sunlight" (Jack Glass, Christopher Stracey)	Dance Work of the Year	Nominated	
2025	"Got Me Started" by Troye Sivan (Troye Sivan, Styalz Fuego, Jack Glass, Christopher Stracey, Ian Kirkpatrick, Brett McLaughlin, Tayla Parx)	Most Performed Australian Work	Nominated	
2025	"Got Me Started" by Troye Sivan (Troye Sivan, Styalz Fuego, Jack Glass, Christopher Stracey, Ian Kirkpatrick, Brett McLaughlin, Tayla Parx)	Most Performed Pop Work	Nominated	

=== J Award ===
The J Awards are an annual series of Australian music awards that were established by the Australian Broadcasting Corporation's youth-focused radio station Triple J. They commenced in 2005.

Year	Nominee / work	Award	Result	Ref.
2010	Bag Raiders	Australian Album of the Year	Nominated	
