= On Tour (song) =

Single by Bliss n Eso

from the album Flying Colours Live
- Released: 12 June 2009
- Genre: Hip hop
- Length: 2:54
- Label: Illusive Sounds
- Songwriter: Jonathon Notley and Max MacKinnon

Bliss n Eso singles chronology
"Field of Dreams" (2009)	"On Tour" (2009)	"Down by the River" (2010)

On Tour is a song by Australian hip hop trio Bliss n Eso. It was released 12 June 2009 through Illusive Sounds. The song appeared on the live album Flying Colours Live, as a bonus track. The song peaked at No. 76 on the ARIA Singles Chart.

== Content ==
The song opens with Bliss yelling to Eso from his car that they are going to be late for a flight. In the song Bliss n Eso describe life on tour.

== Track listing ==
1. "On Tour" (Clean)
2. "On Tour"

== Charts ==
Chart (2009)	Peak position
Australia (ARIA)	76
