= Bag Raiders (album) =

Studio album by Bag Raiders
- Released: 1 October 2010
- Genre: Nu-disco; dance-pop; electropop
- Label: Modular
- Producer: Bag Raiders

Bag Raiders chronology
Big Fun (2009)	Bag Raiders (2010)	Nairobi (2014)

Singles from Bag Raiders
- 1. "Way Back Home" Released: August 2010; 2. "Sunlight" Released: November 2010; 3. "Not Over" Released: June 2011

Professional ratings
Review scores
Source	Rating
AllMusic	3.5/5 stars
MusicOMH	3.5/5 stars

Bag Raiders is the debut studio album by Australian electronic duo Bag Raiders, released on 1 October 2010 by Modular Recordings. The album debuted at number 7 on the Australian ARIA Albums Chart.

The album included the song "Shooting Stars", originally released on the group's 2008 EP, Turbo Love!.

At the J Awards of 2010, the album was nominated for Australian Album of the Year.

== Track listing ==
Standard edition
No.	Title	Length
1.	"Castles in the Air"	3:32
2.	"Sunlight" (featuring Dan Black)	4:03
3.	"Shooting Stars"	3:56
4.	"So Demanding"	3:44
5.	"Gone Away"	2:46
6.	"Prelude"	3:07
7.	"Not Over"	4:00
8.	"Snake Charmer"	4:00
9.	"Always"	3:46
10.	"Golden Wings"	4:44
11.	"Way Back Home"	4:17
Total length:		41:55

Deluxe edition
No.	Title	Length
12.	"Tonight"	3:51
13.	"Sunlight (Tiedye Remix)"	5:20
14.	"Not Over (Softwar Remix)"	6:33
15.	"Shooting Stars (Shazam Dub)"	3:50
16.	"Snake Charmer (Afrikan Boy Version)"	3:26
17.	"Strangers on the Roof"	3:54
18.	"Way Back Home (Club Version)"	5:16
19.	"Shooting Stars (Siriusmo Remix)"	5:37
20.	"Snake Charmer (Cassian Remix)"	5:41
21.	"Sunlight (Armand Van Helden Remix)"	5:14
22.	"Way Back Home (Harvard Bass Remix)"	5:50
23.	"Not Over (Eli Escobar Remix)"	6:29
24.	"Heartbeat"	3:03
25.	"Waves"	2:34
Total length:		1:48:33

== Charts ==
Chart (2010)	Peak position
Australian Albums (ARIA)	7
German Albums (Offizielle Top 100)	36
