= Broken Leg =

Single by Bluejuice

from the album Head of the Hawk
- Released: July 2009
- Recorded: 2009
- Genre: Indie rock
- Length: 3:17
- Label: Dew Process
- Songwriters: Jake Stone, Stavros Yiannoukas, Jamie Cibej, James Hauptmann, Ned Molesworth
- Producer: Chris Shaw

Bluejuice singles chronology
"The Reductionist" (2008)	"Broken Leg" (2009)	"(Ain't) Telling the Truth" (2010)

"Broken Leg" is a song written and recorded by Australian indie rock band Bluejuice. The song was released in July 2009 as the lead single from the band's second studio album, Head of the Hawk. The song peaked at number 27 on the ARIA Charts and was certified gold in 2010.

AT the ARIA Music Awards of 2009, the song was nominated for two awards; Breakthrough Artist and Best Video.

The song polled at number 5 on the 2009 Triple J Hottest 100.

== Charts ==
=== Weekly charts ===
Chart (2009–2010)	Peak position
Australia (ARIA)	27

=== Year-end charts ===
Chart (2009)	Position
Australian Artist (ARIA)	22

== Certification ==
Region	Certification	Certified units/sales
Australia (ARIA)	2× Platinum	140,000^{‡}
^{‡} Sales+streaming figures based on certification alone.

== Release history ==
Country	Date	Format	Label	Catalogue
Australia	July 2009	CD Single Digital download	Dew Process	271452–3
