= Asta (musician) =

- Born: Asta Evelyn Binnie-Ireland; 13 January 1994 (age 32)
- Origin: Cygnet, Tasmania, Australia
- Genre: Indie pop
- Occupation: Singer
- Instrument: Vocals
- Years active: 2012–present
- Website: http://www.astaworld.com.au/

Asta (born Asta Evelyn Binnie-Ireland, 13 January 1996) is a singer-songwriter from Cygnet, Tasmania, Australia.

In 2015, Asta told The Guardian, "I had the best childhood, I was born in this little town called Cygnet, and I was surrounded by music. My parents would make music, just have jams. I was encouraged to start busking as a kid and writing. Tassie is an amazing place to not be influenced by much." Asta added, "I started when I was seven years old. It was a fun, silly thing to do, it wasn't for money, it was basically to build my confidence up. My parents saw that I could sing and they motivated me to get out there. Busking is a good idea because the amount of shows you do is important."

Asta names Destiny's Child, Michael Jackson, Hilary Duff, Bardot, Chaka Khan, Adele and Beyoncé as musical inspiration.

== Career ==
=== 2012-present ===
Asta rose to prominence when her track "My Heart Is On Fire" won Triple J's Unearthed High in 2012. Following the win Unearthed MD Dave Ruby Howe said, "As the entries from budding musos around the country rolled in to this year's Unearthed High comp it was difficult to shake the pull of Hobart school girl Asta and her stirring pop tune 'My Heart Is On Fire'. In a field of six finalists – and four other solo acts – Asta asserted her individual spark with an infectious mixture of smoky crooning and effortless pop production that just hits the ear-candy spot instantaneously."

The track went on to be voted into position 50 in the Triple J Hottest 100, 2012.

Singles "Escape" and "I Need Answers" were released in 2012 and 2013 as well as touring Australia nationally.

In 2015, she released the song "Dynamite" featuring Australian rapper Allday, which reached number 66 on the ARIA Singles Chart. She featured as the opening act for British musical act Ellie Goulding in 2015 and featured at music festivals such as The Plot in December 2015, Skullduggery (Adelaide) in February 2016 and Hyperfest (Perth) in February 2017.

In 2016 she released the single "Wild Emotion", and toured Australia. Also in 2016, Asta toured as the opening act for Ellie Goulding on the Australian leg of her Delirium Tour.

In February 2017 she released her debut EP, Shine.

In 2022, her track Mark Maxwell-remixed track "Santorini" peaked at number 1 on the ARIA club Charts for 8 weeks, finishing the year as #2 in the Annual ARIA club charts.

In February 2023, after a 4 year release hiatus, Asta released her single "Ahhh".

== Discography ==
=== Extended plays ===
List of EPs, with selected details
Title	Details
Shine	Released: 17 February 2017; Label: Asta World; Formats: CD, digital download

=== Charted and/ or certified singles ===
List of charted and/ or certified singles with year released and album shown
Title	Year	Peak chart positions	Certification	Album
Title	Year	AUS	Certification	Album
"Dynamite" (featuring Allday)	2015	66		
"Be Like You" (Esoterik with James Crooks and Asta)	2017	—	ARIA: Gold	My Astral Plane
"—" denotes releases that did not chart or were not released.

== Awards ==
=== J Awards ===
The J Awards are an annual series of Australian music awards that were established by the Australian Broadcasting Corporation's youth-focused radio station Triple J. They commenced in 2005.

Year	Nominee / work	Award	Result	Ref.
2021	Asta for "My Heart is on Fire"	Unearthed High Competition	Won	
