= Down by the River (Bliss n Eso song) =

Single by Bliss n Eso

from the album Running on Air
- Released: 14 May 2010
- Genre: Hip hop
- Length: 2:54
- Label: Illusive Sounds
- Songwriter: Jonathon Notley and Max MacKinnon

Bliss n Eso singles chronology
"On Tour" (2009)	"Down by the River" (2010)	"Addicted" (2010)

'Down by the River' is a song by Australian hip hop trio Bliss n Eso. It released on 14 May 2010 through Illusive Sounds as the first single from the trio's fourth studio album Running on Air. The song debuted at No. 83 on the ARIA Singles Chart, it peaked at No. 45 on its 12th week on the chart. It also finished at No. 41 on the Triple J Hottest 100 for 2010. In 2013, 'Down by the River' was accredited gold by the Australian Recording Industry Association for sales/shipments of 35,000 copies. The song was also featured in the 2020 video game AFL Evolution 2.

== Music video ==
The song's accompanying music video was released on Bliss n Eso's official YouTube channel on 16 June 2010, it achieved over 300,000 and an alternate upload has around 1 million views. In the video, Bliss n Eso move quickly through a forest while they rap the song, as well as go BMX riding, fishing and riding wheelie bins.

== Charts ==
Charts (2010)	Peak position
Australia (ARIA)	45

== Certifications ==
Region	Certification	Certified units/sales
Australia (ARIA)	2× Platinum	140,000^{‡}
^{‡} Sales+streaming figures based on certification alone.
