= Reflections (Bliss n Eso song) =

Single by Bliss n Eso

from the album Running on Air
- Released: 17 December 2010
- Genre: Hip hop
- Length: 3:05
- Label: Illusive Sounds
- Songwriter: Jonathon Notley and Max MacKinnon

Bliss n Eso singles chronology
"Addicted" (2010)	"Reflections" (2010)	"Coastal Kids" (2011)

"Reflections" is a song by Australian hip hop trio Bliss n Eso. It was released on 17 December 2010 through Illusive Sounds as the third single from the trio's fourth studio album, 2010's Running on Air. The song was written by MC Bliss (Jonathon Notley) and MC Eso (Max MacKinnon). Reflections debuted at No. 86 on the ARIA Singles Chart, and peaked at No. 53. It also finished at No. 53 on the Triple J Hottest 100 for 2010. No music video was made for the song, however the audio of the song uploaded to Bliss n Eso's channel currently has over 1 million views. "Reflections" received highly positive reviews and is regarded to be one of the best songs on Running on Air. In 2025, "Reflections" was certified double platinum by the Australian Recording Industry Association for sales exceeding 140,000 equivalent units.

== Content ==
The song's lyrics revolve around reflections as in Bliss and Eso's reflections in a mirror and well as them reflecting on their pasts and current lives. The artwork follows this theme as it shows an image of Bliss, Eso and Izm in the top half of the artwork and the same image in the bottom half upside-down as their reflection.

== Critical reception ==
Reception to the song was highly positive and it is regarded to be one of the best songs on Running on Air. TheVine.com.au was positive, labeling the chorus as "insatiably catchy" also writing "Guided by a lone acoustic guitar and a strolling slide guitar riff, 'Reflections' will be the hit of this year’s summer festival circuit."

== Chart performance ==
"Reflections" debuted at No. 86 on the ARIA Singles Chart in January 2011, it peaked at No. 53 in February and spent 8 weeks on the chart. It exited the chart in March 2011. It also finished at #53 on the Triple J Hottest 100, 2010 below "Addicted" at No. 23 and "Down By The River" at No. 41.

== Charts ==
Charts (2010/11)	Peak position
Australia (ARIA)	53

== Certifications ==
Region	Certification	Certified units/sales
Australia (ARIA)	2× Platinum	140,000^{‡}
^{‡} Sales+streaming figures based on certification alone.
