= Head of the Hawk =

Studio album by Bluejuice
- Released: 18 September 2009
- Recorded: Big Jesus Burger, 2009
- Genre: Indie rock
- Producer: Chris Shaw

Bluejuice chronology
Problems (2007)	Head of the Hawk (2009)	Company (2011)

Singles from Head of the Hawk
- 1. "Broken Leg" Released: July 2009; 2. "(Ain't) Telling the Truth" Released: February 2010; 3. "Head of the Hawk" Released: May 2010

Head of the Hawk is the second studio album by the Australian rock band Bluejuice, released through Dew Process on 18 September 2009. The album was recorded with producer Chris Shaw in Sydney's Big Jesus Burger studios in 2009.

== Reception ==
Rolling Stone Australia gave the album three and a half stars out of five. Time Out Sydney rated the album four out of five stars.

== Track listing ==
1. "Head of the Hawk" — 2:44
2. "Miss Johnston" — 3:16
3. "Broken Leg" — 3:12
4. "Little Emperor" — 3:08
5. "(Ain't) Telling the Truth" — 2:43
6. "Facelift" — 2:08
7. "Medication" — 2:48
8. "Knife Fight" — 2:25
9. "Work" — 2:47
10. "The Devil" — 2:04
11. "We Can Get Around It" — 2:50

== Charts ==
Chart (2009)	Peak position
Australian Albums (ARIA)	37

== Certifications ==
Certifications for "Head of the Hawk"
Region	Certification	Certified units/sales
Australia (ARIA)	Gold	35,000^{‡}
^{‡} Sales+streaming figures based on certification alone.

== Release history ==
Region	Date	Format	Label	Catalogue
Australia	September 2009	CD; digital download	Dew Process	DEW9000193
