= Flowers in the Pavement =

Studio album by Bliss n Eso
- Released: 23 August 2004
- Genre: Hip-hop
- Length: 67:23
- Label: Obese
- Producer: J. Notley, P. Tzantetos, BNA Productions

Bliss n Eso chronology
The Arrival (2000)	Flowers in the Pavement (2004)	Day of the Dog (2006)

Flowers in the Pavement is the debut album by Australian hip-hop group Bliss n Eso, which was released on 23 August 2004 via Obese Records. The album peaked at number 46 on the ARIA Charts after its 20th anniversary release in 2024.

"This Is for You" received airplay on Triple J's Home and Hosed program. It was also played on NOVA FM. "This Is for You" and "Pigs in the Porn Trough" secured Bliss n Eso as the 'hip hop' category winners and 'artist of the year' nominees at the annual National Music Oz Awards in 2003 and 2004. "Hip Hop Blues" was produced by Suffa from Hilltop Hoods. The group toured in support of the album, across Australia including dates in Adelaide, Canberra, Melbourne, Hobart and Brisbane.

== Reception ==
Professional ratings
Review scores
Source	Rating
Inthemix	(favourable)

Vaughan Healey of Cyclic Defrost felt that it is "a deceptively dense album: full of laddish appeal but balanced by peculiar turns, strong production values and a lyrical depth" with its tracks "structured around sophisticated metaphor and clever metre" and "it continues the Obese tradition of releasing idiosyncratic, upfront local hiphop."

== Track listing ==
All songs written by Jonathon Notley and Max MacKinnon, except where noted

1. "Evolution" (intro) – 2:45
2. "Creepy" – 5:24
3. "Rubbed the Lamp the Wrong Way" (J. Notley, M. MacKinnon, Millis, P-M. Anquetil, C. Lee-Joe) – 4:37
4. "Vagina Ice" (J. Notley, M. MacKinnon, P-M. Anquetil, C. Lee-Joe) – 3:23
5. "Clean the Tub" – 0:59
6. "Pigs in the Porn Trough" (J. Notley, M. MacKinnon, P-M. Anquetil, C. Lee-Joe) – 6:34
7. "I Love You But..." – 0:19
8. "Tunnel of Love" – 4:52
9. "Greenhouse" (J. Notley, M. MacKinnon, Millis, P-M. Anquetil, C. Lee-Joe) – 4:50
10. "Supermarket Chick" – 0:44
11. "Get Amongst It" (J. Notley, M. MacKinnon, P-M. Anquetil, C. Lee-Joe) – 5:19
12. "This is for You" – 3:36
13. "Headless Princess" (featuring Ethic) – 7:09
14. "Hip Hop Blues" – 4:00
15. "Twisted Road" (J. Notley, M. MacKinnon, T. Ejjamai) – 4:00
16. "Weathermen" – 3:35
17. "Watchdog Water Dragons" – 5:17

== Charts ==
Chart performance for Flowers in the Pavement
Chart (2024)	Peak position
Australian Albums (ARIA)	46
Australian Hip Hop/R&B Albums (ARIA)	11

== Release history ==
Region	Date	Format	Edition(s)	Label	Catalogue
Australia	23 August 2004	CD; 2xLP	Standard edition	Obese Records	OBR019
Australia	6 December 2024	2xLP	20th Anniversary	Flight Deck	BNE137
