= Problems (Bluejuice album) =

Studio album by Bluejuice
- Released: August 2007
- Studio: Megaphon Studios, Velvet Sound Studios
- Length: 34:34
- Producer: Jim Masheder, Genevieve Maynard

Bluejuice chronology
The Good Luck Pig (2005)	Problems (2007)	Head of the Hawk (2009)

Singles from Problems
- 1. "Get Me Down" Released: May 2007; 2. "Vitriol" Released: June 2007; 3. "The Reductionist" Released: late 2007

Problems is the debut studio album by the Australian rock band Bluejuice.

The album was shortlisted for the 2007 Australian Music Prize.

== Reception ==
Rolling Stone Australia gave the album four out of five.

== Track listing ==
1. "Get Me Down" — 2:39
2. "Hunnamunnafeeb" — 3:47
3. "Vitriol" — 2:29
4. "We Get It Right" — 3:02
5. "Let's Kill It" — 2:06
6. "Motorcycle Accident" — 3:19
7. "Reductionist" — 3:35
8. "Phantom Boogie" — 2:52
9. "Mountain Goat" — 3:10
10. "Back Breakin'" — 4:32
11. "Midnightat Band Camp" — 2:48

== Release history ==
Region	Date	Format	Label	Catalogue
Australia	August 2007	CD; digital download	Ja Ja Cravworth Records	JAJA0003
