= The Arrival (EP) =

EP by Bliss n Esoterikism
- Released: 2000
- Recorded: Floating Point Studios, Sydney
- Genre: Hip-hop
- Length: 20:56
- Label: Independent
- Producer: DJ Tokoloshe

Bliss n Esoterikism chronology
The Arrival (2000)	Flowers in the Pavement (2004)

The Arrival is the debut EP by the Australian hip-hop trio Bliss n Eso, released under the group's original name Bliss n Esoterikizm. Bliss n Esoterikizm proved to be too much of a mouthful for most people so it was shortened.

The EP was produced by DJ Tokoloshe and features Nick Toth (scratches/turntablism) on "Next Shit" and MC Layla (vocals) on "Dreams".

== Track listing ==
All tracks are written by Jonathon Notley (MC Bliss) and Max MacKinnon (MC Eso).

No.	Title	Length
1.	"Next Shit"	3:07
2.	"What Can I Do"	5:37
3.	"Dreams"	3:44
4.	"Shogun"	4:38
5.	"The Path (remix)"	3:50
