= Addicted (Bliss n Eso song) =

Single by Bliss n Eso

from the album Running On Air
- Released: 30 July 2010
- Genre: Hip hop
- Length: 3:51
- Label: Illusive Sounds
- Songwriter: Jonathon Notley and Max MacKinnon

Bliss n Eso singles chronology
"Down by the River" (2010)	"Addicted" (2010)	"Reflections" (2010)

"Addicted" is a song by Australian hip hop trio Bliss n Eso. It was released on 30 July 2010 through Illusive Sounds as the second single from the trio's fourth studio album Running On Air. It debuted at No. 93 on the ARIA Singles Chart, peaked at No. 38 and went on to spend a total of 33 weeks on the chart, making it one of 'Bliss n Eso's' biggest hits. "Addicted" finished at No. 23 on the Triple J Hottest 100 for 2010. The song's music video was created using stop motion animation with graffiti. "Addicted" received highly positive reviews and is regarded to be one of the best songs on "Running On Air".

An instrumental version is used as the theme song for seasons 2-4 of Hamish & Andy's Gap Year.

== Music video ==
The song's accompanying music video was released on 2 November 2010. It runs for three minutes and ten seconds, and was directed by James Solomon. The film clip uses stop motion animation to animate graffiti as it moves along the walls of a warehouse and also features a man skateboarding in the warehouse. 2,200 photos were taken. The video was shot over the span of three months in a warehouse in Auckland, New Zealand. The artwork was done by graffiti artists 'Askew One' and 'Deus'. Over 300 cans of paint were used in the filming of the video. On YouTube one upload of the video has over 1.5 million views, and another upload has over 500,000 views.

== Critical reception ==
The song received highly positive reviews. Thevine.com.au was positive, writing "The song opens with the simplest of piano chords for Eso to rap over before a rolling drum marks the beginning of an intricate amalgamation of live instrumentation and sample based production that crescendos into a song that soars. Both Bliss and Eso are at their lyrical sharpest, questioning the socio-political status quo in a manner that matches the uplifting nature of the music".

== Chart ==
Charts (2010)	Peak position
Australia (ARIA)	38

== Certifications ==
Region	Certification	Certified units/sales
Australia (ARIA)	6× Platinum	420,000^{‡}
^{‡} Sales+streaming figures based on certification alone.
