= Flying Colours (Bliss n Eso album) =

Studio album by Bliss n Eso
- Released: 26 April 2008
- Recorded: The Devils Playground & Sing Sing Studios, Melbourne
- Genre: Hip-hop
- Label: Illusive Sounds/Liberation Music
- Producers: Jonathon Notley, Hattori Hunzo

Bliss n Eso chronology
Day of the Dog (2006)	Flying Colours (2008)	Running On Air (2010)

Singles from Flying Colours
- 1. "Bullet and a Target" Released: 29 October 2007; 2. "Woodstock 2008" Released: April 2008; 3. "The Sea is Rising" Released: May 2008; 4. "Eye of the Storm" Released: 2008

Flying Colours is the third studio album by Australian hip-hop group Bliss n Eso. It was released by Illusive Sounds on 26 April 2008.

At the J Awards of 2008, the album was nominated for Australian Album of the Year. At the ARIA Music Awards of 2008, the album won the ARIA award for Best Urban Release.

== Background and release ==
The album was recorded in three different continents over twelve months, and features Illmaculate (World freestyle and Scribble Jam champion), a 20 piece African Zulu Choir (The Zulu Connections Choir), Debaser (US), Hyjak and Phrase. In an interview with The Age newspaper Jonathan Notley (Bliss) explained that the band's previous albums were recorded on the fly, in sporadic periods whenever they could score some studio time, whereas with Flying Colours, the Sydneysiders relocated to Melbourne for three months of dedicated writing and recording at Richmond's Sing Sing Studios

"We decided to get out of Sydney and go somewhere where we could get up every day and just focus on making the record. It was great. We weren't worried about the pressure of what people would think, or forcing it or trying to make hits" - Notley

The cover of the album features artwork by tattoo artist, Steve Cross from Melbourne. It depicts a man with blazing coloured wings leaping off a cliff.

"With this album we wanted to do something a bit different than just pictures of us. We kinda wanted to go a little bit more creative and imaginative. We thought of this concept of this guy like leaping off this cliff with these flaming colourful wings, and it kind of really worked with the context of this album and obviously the title." - Notley

In an interview with X-Press Magazine Notley indicated their surprise at the album's success.

"To tell you the truth it smashed any of my expectations. The reception for the record has been fantastic so we couldn't really be happier at the moment." - Notley

== Reception ==
Professional ratings
Review scores
Source	Rating
AllMusic	3.5/5 stars

It was featured as the Triple J feature album in the week leading up to its release.

== Track listing ==
All songs written by Jonathon Notley, Max MacKinnon and Noam Dishon, except where noted

Flying Colours

1. "The Beginning" – 1:41
2. "Woodstock 2008" – 4:27
3. "Eye of the Storm" (Jonathon Notley, Max MacKinnon, A. Stone, J. Stone) – 3:27
4. "Bullet and a Target" (featuring the Zulu Connection Choir) (Clarence Greenwood) – 4:15
5. "Happy in My Hoody" (featuring Hyjak and Phrase) (Jonathon Notley, Max MacKinnon, J McCarthy, Harley Webster, Vester) – 4:19
6. "Destiny Lane" (Jonathon Notley, Max MacKinnon, Mark Landon) – 3:41
7. "Zion Bash" (Jonathon Notley, Max MacKinnon, Mark Landon) – 2:51
8. "The Sea is Rising" – 5:36
9. "Gorilla Militia" (Jonathon Notley, Max MacKinnon, Mark Landon) – 3:14
10. "How to Listen, Part 1" – 3:02
11. "Climb These Cliffs" (Jonathon Notley, Max MacKinnon, Noam Dishon, Mark Landon) – 3:41
12. "At Midnight" – 5:21
13. "Royal Flush" – 3:52
14. "$5 Steak" (Jonathon Notley, Max MacKinnon, Noam Dishon, Etheridge, Montgo) – 5:35
15. "The Truth" (featuring ILLmacuLate and Sapient) – 4:41
16. "Never Give Up" (featuring Changes) (Jonathon Notley, Max MacKinnon, Noam Dishon, Mchunu, Mhlongo) – 4:31
17. "Field of Dreams" (featuring Paris Wells) – 3:24

Flying Colours limited edition bonus disc

1. "The Dark Tower" – 5:49 (features a sample from the 1947 radioplay The Dark Tower by Louis MacNeice)
2. "Lonely Streets" (featuring Debaser) – 4:33
3. "Bullet and a Target" (acoustic version) (featuring the Zulu Connection Choir) – 3:58
4. "Mexican Spit Fire" – 2:30
5. "Choof Choof Train" – 4:09

== Charts ==
=== Weekly charts ===
Chart (2008/09)	Peak position
Australian Albums (ARIA)	10

Chart (2023)	Peak position
Australian Albums (ARIA)	15

=== Year-end charts ===
Chart (2008)	Position
Australian Artist Albums (ARIA)	40
Chart (2009)	Position
Australian Artist Albums (ARIA)	45

== Certifications ==
Region	Certification	Certified units/sales
Australia (ARIA)	Platinum	70,000^{‡}
^{‡} Sales+streaming figures based on certification alone.

== Release history ==
Region	Date	Format	Edition(s)	Label	Catalogue
Australia	26 April 2008	2xCD; digital download	Limited Edition	Illusive Sounds	ILL006CD
Australia	26 April 2008	CD; digital download	Standard edition	Illusive Sounds	ILL007CD
South Africa	26 April 2008	CD	Standard edition	Creative Canopy	RSCD1048170
Australia	2009	2xLP + DVD	Deluxe Edition / Flying Colours	Illusive Sounds	BNE028
Australia	December 2023	2xLP	15th Anniversary re-release	Illusive Sounds	BNE 140
