= Hattori Hunzo =

Noam Dishon, better known by his alias "Hattori Hunzo" is an Australian hip hop producer, multi-instrumentalist and mixing engineer. Best known his work on the Bliss n Eso albums Flying Colours (which won an ARIA award for Best Urban Release in 2008) and Running On Air (which debuted at No. 1 on the ARIA Album Charts and also went Gold), he has also worked on Seth Sentry's The Waiter Minute EP and TZU's Computer Love.

His production style is identified by 'an intricate amalgamation of live instrumentation and sample based production that crescendos into a song that soars.'
