= Act Yr Age =

Single by Bluejuice

from the album Company
- Released: October 2011
- Recorded: 2011
- Length: 3:20
- Label: Dew Process
- Songwriter(s): Bluejuice, Alex Burnett

Bluejuice singles chronology
"Head of the Hawk" (2010)	"Act Yr Age" (2011)	"On My Own" (2012)

"Act Yr Age" is a song recorded by Australian indie rock band Bluejuice. The song was released in 2011 as the lead single from the band's third and final studio album, Company. The song peaked at number 68 on the ARIA Charts in February 2012.

The song polled at number 20 on the Triple J Hottest 100, 2011. At the J Awards of 2011, the song was nominated for Australian Song of the Year.

The Sam Bennetts directed music video was nominated for Best Video at the ARIA Music Awards of 2012.

In September 2013, Bliss n Eso released "Act Your Age", which samples Bluejuice's track.

== Reception ==
In an album review, Beat Magazine said "Lead single 'Act Yr Age' is an amazing slice of pop, with gem lyrics like 'I've been down so long/I got comfortable on my knees', elevate it from the mundane, lowest common denomination pop that ARIA has graciously fed us 98% of the time for the past 25 years."

== Music video ==
The music video for "Act Yr Age" was directed by Sam Bennetts and released in October 2011. It features lead singer Jake Stone in an unexpected passionate tryst with an older woman in the park, witnessed by innocent members of the public and band members Stavros Yiannoukas, Jamie Cibej, Jerry Craib and James Hauptmann.

== Charts ==
Chart (2012)	Peak position
Australia (ARIA Chart)	68

== Certifications ==
Certifications for "Act Yr Age"
Region	Certification	Certified units/sales
Australia (ARIA)	Platinum	70,000^{‡}
^{‡} Sales+streaming figures based on certification alone.

== Release history ==
Country	Date	Format	Label	Catalogue
Australia	October 2011	CD Single Digital download	Dew Process	
