= Act Your Age (song) =

Single by Bliss n Eso

from the album Circus in the Sky
- Released: 16 August 2013
- Recorded: 2013
- Genre: Hip-hop
- Length: 2:39
- Label: Illusive Sounds
- Songwriter(s): Alexander Burnett, Jamie Cibej, Jerry Craib, James Hauptmann, Max MacKinnon, Jonathan Notley, Jacob Stone, Stavros Yiannoukas
- Producer(s): DJ Izm, MC Bliss, MC Eso

Bliss n Eso singles chronology
"Reservoir Dogs" (2013)	"Act Your Age" (2013)	"My Life" (2013)

"Act Your Age" is a song by Australian hip hop trio Bliss n Eso. It was released as the fourth single from their fifth studio album Circus in the Sky. The single was released through Illusive Sounds on 16 August 2013. The song peaked at number 31 on the ARIA Singles Chart and was certified gold, making it Bliss n Eso's fifth gold single. The song contains a sample of "Act Yr Age" by Bluejuice. The song's message is to not worry about acting your age, just have fun. 'Act Your Age' finished at #67 on the 2013 Triple J Hottest 100.

== Music video ==
The song's video was uploaded to Bliss N Eso's YouTube channel "blissnesoTV" on 7 August 2013, and currently has about 2,000,000 views. The video show's Bliss N Eso waking up after a night of partying and well as flashbacks to the party the day before, where they, among other things, swim, dance, eat cake and ride a helicopter. The video also contains references to Borat and Ron Burgundy, and features a cameo from comedian Alex Williamson, who features on the song "Cialis Cuts" and whom Eso has previously collaborated with comically. The video was filmed over two days at a private property in Bilambil, NSW Australia.

== Critical reception ==
Reception to the song was positive. AAA Backstage wrote that "'Act Your Age', sampling Bluejuice's pop hit 'Act Yr Age' is a great example of Izm's scratching and is a cheeky throwback to the trio's previous style of rapping; truly a rolling romp all the way back to their early days."

== Chart performance ==
The song debuted at No. 78 on the ARIA Singles Chart and went on to peak at No. 31, and spent a total of 12 weeks on the chart. It was certified Gold in January 2014 for sales/shipments of over 35,000 copies.

== Charts ==
Charts (2013)	Peak position
Australia (ARIA)	31
Australian Urban Singles Chart (ARIA)	5

== Certifications ==
Region	Certification	Certified units/sales
Australia (ARIA)	4× Platinum	280,000^{‡}
^{‡} Sales+streaming figures based on certification alone.
