= Vitriol (song) =

Single by Bluejuice

from the album Problems
- Released: June 2007
- Studio: Megaphon Studios, Sydney
- Length: 2:32
- Label: Ja Ja Cravworth Records
- Songwriter: Bluejuice
- Producer: Genevieve Maynard

Bluejuice singles chronology
"Get Me Down" (2007)	"Vitriol" (2007)	"The Reductionist" (2007)

"Vitriol" is a song recorded by Australian indie rock band Bluejuice. The song was released in June 2007 as the second single from the band's debut studio album, Problems.

The song polled at number 11 on the Triple J Hottest 100, 2007 and at 2007 Sunscreen Video Awards, won Best Clip.

In speaking The Music in 2012 vocalist Jake Stone said "'Vitriol' was an independent release and it had massive success and way beyond what we ever imagined."

In 2015, Grenadiers covered the song for Like a Version.

The song was certified gold in Australia in 2025.

== Music video ==
The guerilla-style music video was filmed in 20 minutes. It was filmed in Chinatown, Sydney and features the duo dressed in white robes. Stone said "We went to places where we knew people would be congregating. In Chinatown we knew they wouldn't necessarily understand the language or what we're trying to do. It's also a small and contained area where people can't escape."

== Track listings ==
Digital download

1. "Vitriol" — 2:32

Digital download

1. "Vitriol" (Pious edit) — 2:32

Digital download

1. "Vitriol" (ELF remix) — 3:31

== Certifications ==
Certifications for "Vitriol"
Region	Certification	Certified units/sales
Australia (ARIA)	Gold	35,000^{‡}
^{‡} Sales+streaming figures based on certification alone.
