= My Life (Bliss n Eso song) =

Single by Bliss n Eso

from the album Circus in the Sky
- Released: 11 November 2013
- Recorded: 2013
- Genre: Hip-hop
- Length: 3:37
- Label: Illusive Sounds
- Songwriter(s): Max McKinnon, Matthew Kirk, Jonathan Notley, Ebony West, Nigel Kirk

Bliss n Eso singles chronology
"Act Your Age" (2013)	"My Life" (2013)	"I Am Somebody" (2014)

"My Life" is a song by Australian hip-hop group Bliss n Eso, with guest vocals performed by American recording artist, Ceekay Jones. Written by Max McKinnon, Matthew Kirk, Jonathan Notley, Ebony West (Runway Star) and Nigel Kirk, the song was first released in November 2013 as the fifth single from Bliss n Eso's fifth studio album, Circus in the Sky (2013).

== Background and release ==
In late 2012, Bliss n Eso began recording material for their fifth studio album, Circus in the Sky (2013) in Australia and Los Angeles, with the goal of "creating their most electric and progressive album to date". After touring North America and visiting Afghanistan to perform for Australian troops, Bliss N Eso released "My Life" as the fifth single from their aforementioned album in November 2013.

== Music video ==
The song's accompanying music video, which runs for four minutes and forty-nine seconds was directed by Allan Hardy. While the video contains footage from Bliss n Eso's visit to Canada and the United States, it mostly centres on Australian freestyle motocross racer, Cam Sinclair. The video chronicles Sinclair's life-threatening accident at the 2009 Red Bull X Fighters Freestyle Motocross event in Madrid, Spain, the rehabilitation and training he undergoes in the aftermath of this accident and his subsequent return to competition at the 2010 X Games in Los Angeles. In addition to Sinclair, the video also features appearances from a number of other athletes including, Robbie Maddison, TJ Lavin, Aaron "Wheelz" Fotheringham, Jaie Toohey, Cam White and James Doerfling among others.

== Track listing ==
Digital download

No.	Title	Length
1.	"My Life" (featuring Ceekay Jones)	3:37

== Chart performance ==
"My Life" debuted at number forty-six on the Australian ARIA singles chart and eventually peaked at number twenty-six, becoming Bliss N Eso's highest charting single to date. It was certified double platinum by the Australian Recording Industry Association (ARIA) for sales in excess of 140,000 equivalent units.

== Charts ==
Chart (2014)	Peak position
Australia (ARIA)	26
Australian Artist Singles Chart (ARIA)	4
Australian Digital Tracks Chart (ARIA)	29
Australian Urban Singles Chart (ARIA)	5

== Certifications ==
Region	Certification	Certified units/sales
Australia (ARIA)	2× Platinum	140,000^{‡}
^{‡} Sales+streaming figures based on certification alone.
