= Bluejuice =

Australian indie rock band

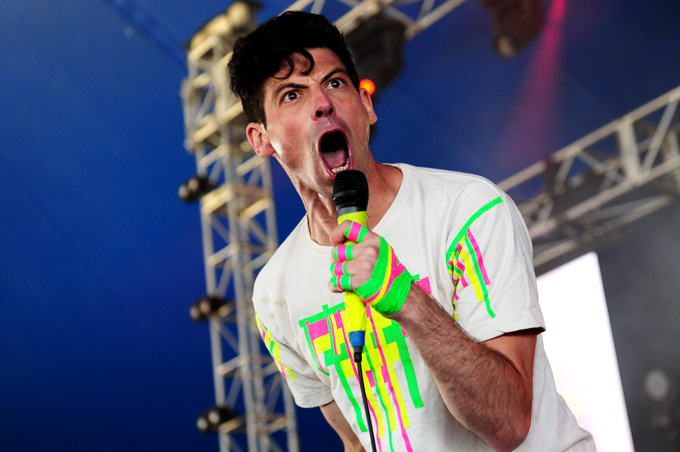
- Bluejuice perform at the Perth Big Day Out (2012)

Background information
- Origin: Sydney, Australia
- Genres: Indie rock, Funk rock
- Years active: 2000–2014
- Label: Dew Process
- Past members: Jake Stone; Stavros Yiannoukas; Jamie Cibej; James Hauptmann; Ned Molesworth; Jerry Craib
- Website: Bluejuice.info

Bluejuice was an Australian band based in Sydney, active between 2000 and 2014. The group's final line-up consisted of co-lead vocalists Jake Stone and Stavros Yiannoukas, bassist Jamie Cibej, and drummer James Hauptmann. The band released three studio albums, Problems, Head of the Hawk, and Company, as well as a greatest hits album in 2014.

== History ==
=== 2000–2006: Career beginning and EPs ===
In 2003, the band released their debut extended play Zebraaazz. In 2003, the band won the Musicoz Australian Independent Music Award, which aims to promote and encourage artists from the independent music community.

In 2005, a second extended play titled The Good Luck Pig was released.

=== 2007–2008: Problems ===
Bluejuice released their debut studio album Problems in August 2007. Problems was well received by Rolling Stone magazine in Australia, which awarded the album a four out of five rating.

The band's single, "Vitriol", enjoyed airplay on the Australian national radio network Triple J, being the second most popular track in 2007 and ultimately reaching No. 11 in the Triple J Hottest 100, 2007. "Vitriol" ranked number 67 in the Australian Rolling Stone Magazine's 100 Best songs of 2007. The video clip for "Vitriol" won best clip at Sunscreen Video Awards in 2007.

=== 2009–2010: Head of the Hawk ===
In 2009, Bluejuice signed to the Australian record label Dew Process and recorded their second studio album at Big Jesus Burger in Sydney with producer/mixer Chris Shaw (Bob Dylan, Public Enemy, Super Furry Animals, Weezer). The album's lead single "Broken Leg" debuted on the Australian Singles Chart at number 47 on 23 August 2009. They released the album Head of the Hawk on 18 September 2009, and it debuted at No. 37 on the Australian Albums Chart. "Broken Leg" eventually peaked at No. 27 on the Australian Singles Chart and was certified gold. "Broken Leg" polled at No. 5 in the Triple J Hottest 100, 2009. The band promoted the album by performing the song on Channel Seven's Sunrise and Channel Nine's Wide World of Sports.

At the ARIA Music Awards of 2009, "Broken Leg" was nominated for Breakthrough Artist and Best Video.

The album's second single "(Ain't) Telling the Truth" was released in February 2010 and "Head of the Hawk" followed later in the year. In September 2010, Hawthorn Football Club players Ben Stratton, Jarryd Morton, Matt Suckling and Liam Shiels re-enacted the "Broken Leg" video clip live as part of the 2010 Player Review on the AFL Footy Show.

=== 2011–2012: Company ===
In October 2011, Bluejuice released "Act Yr Age" as the lead single from their third studio album. In November 2011, Bluejuice released their third studio album Company. The album spawned two further singles in 2012, "On My Own" and "The Recession".

=== 2013–2014: Break up and Retrospectable ===
In March 2013, the band's keyboard player, bassist, guitarist and drummer, Jerry Craib, announced his resignation from the band. The public became aware of the decision due to an announcement on the Bluejuice Facebook fan page. The phrase "formidable musical talents" was also used to describe Craib in the Facebook post and information on Craib's future was not provided; however, the band stated that it wished for Craib to return to Bluejuice at another time.

In August 2013, Australian hip hop trio Bliss N Eso released the song "Act Your Age", which sampled Bluejuice's 2011 song "Act Yr Age". At the APRA Music Awards of 2014, the song won Urban Work of the Year.

On 3 August 2014, Stone announced the dissolution of Bluejuice during an interview on Triple J. A "eulogy" was published on the Australian music website Faster Louder later in the month.

As part of the dissolution process, Bluejuice released a new single "I'll Go Crazy" as part of a "greatest hits" record, Retrospectable, released in September 2014. The group announced a farewell Australian tour which ran over September and October 2014, and included shows in Sydney, Melbourne and Adelaide, as well as a North Queensland leg and some regional dates. The tour saw a number of sold-out shows, including both gigs at Sydney's Metro Theatre.

=== 2015–present: Post-split activity ===
On 28 November 2016, Stone released his first single under his own name, "Trick of the Light", through Australian music website Happy Mag alongside an interview. The song was produced by and co-written with longtime Bluejuice collaborator Alex Gooden, featured guitar contributions from Bluejuice touring guitarist Dan Farrugia, and additional vocals and production from Dan Williams from Art vs. Science. Since that time, the former band members have pursued careers outside of performance. Of note, Stone has produced multiple music industry events, and Yiannoukas works as a voiceover artist.

In October 2022, Bluejuice announced two November 2022 releases: an EP titled Jelly, featuring previously unreleased tracks, and a re-release of their 2011 studio album Company on vinyl for the first time.

== Musical style ==
The musical style of Bluejuice has variously been described as "punk-hop", "downtempo hip hop, ska-tinged pop and pounding disco" and "too straight for funk, too groovy for indie rock and too sweaty for pop".

== Discography ==
=== Studio albums ===
Title	Details	Peak chart positions	Certifications
Title	Details	AUS	Certifications
Problems	Released: August 2007; Label: Ja Ja Cravworth Records (JAJA0003); Format: CD, digital download	—	
Head of the Hawk	Released: September 2009; Label: Dew Process (DEW9000193); Format: CD, digital download	37	ARIA: Gold
Company	Released: 11 November 2011; Label: Dew Process (DEW9000396); Format: CD, digital download	23	

=== Compilation albums ===
Title	Details	Peak chart positions
Title	Details	AUS
Retrospectable	Released: September 2014; Label: Dew Process (DEW9000704); Format: CD, digital download	27

=== Extended plays ===
Title	Details
Zebraaazz	Released: 2003; Label: Ja Ja Cravworth Records (JAJA0001); Format: CD, digital download
The Good Luck Pig	Released: 2005; Label: Ja Ja Cravworth Records (JAJA0002); Format: CD, digital download
Jelly	Scheduled: 25 November 2022; Label: Dew Process; Format: CD, digital download

=== Singles ===
List of charity singles, with selected chart positions
Title	Year	Peak chart positions	Certifications	Album
Title	Year	AUS	Certifications	Album
"Get Me Down"	2007	-		Problems
"Vitriol"	2007	-	ARIA: Gold	Problems
"The Reductionist"	2007	-		Problems
"Broken Leg"	2009	27	ARIA: 2× Platinum	Head of the Hawk
"(Ain't) Telling the Truth"	2010	64		Head of the Hawk
"Head of the Hawk"	2010	-		Head of the Hawk
"Act Yr Age"	2011	68	ARIA: Platinum	Company
"On My Own"	2012	-		Company
"The Recession (Winter of Our Discotheque)"	2012	-		Company
"SOS"	2013	-		Retrospectable
"I'll Go Crazy"	2014	-		Retrospectable
"Movies"	2022	-		Jelly

== Awards and nominations ==
=== APRA Awards ===
The APRA Awards are presented annually from 1982 by the Australasian Performing Right Association (APRA), "honouring composers and songwriters". They commenced in 1982.

Year	Nominee / work	Award	Result	Ref.
2010	"Broken Leg" (Jeremy Craib, Jamie Cibej, James Hauptmann, Edmund Molesworth, Jacob Stone, Stavros Yiannoukas)	Song of the Year	Shortlisted	
2012	"Act Your Age" – Bliss n Eso featuring Bluejuice (Alexander Burnett, Jeremy Craib, James Cibej, Jacob Stone, Stavros Yiannoukas, James Hauptmann)	Song of the Year	Shortlisted	
2014	"Act Your Age" – Bliss n Eso featuring Bluejuice	Urban Work of the Year	Won	

=== ARIA Music Awards ===
The ARIA Music Awards are annual awards, which recognise excellence, innovation, and achievement across all genres of Australian music. Bluejuice received six nominations.

Year	Nominee / work	Award	Result
2009	"Broken Leg"	Best Video	Nominated
2009	"Broken Leg"	Breakthrough Artist	Nominated
2010	Head of the Hawk	Best Pop Release	Nominated
2010	Head of the Hawk	Best Cover Art	Nominated
2012	Sam Bennetts for Bluejuice "Act Yr Age"	Best Video	Nominated
2014	Christian J Henrich & Nicholas Rabone for Bluejuice "SOS"	Best Video	Nominated

=== Australian Music Prize ===
The Australian Music Prize is an annual award of $30,000 given to an Australian band or solo artist in recognition of the merit of an album released during the year of award.

Year	Nominee / work	Award	Result
2007	Problems	Australian Music Prize	Nominated

=== J Award ===
The J Awards are an annual series of Australian music awards that were established by the Australian Broadcasting Corporation's youth-focused radio station Triple J. They commenced in 2005.

Year	Nominee / work	Award	Result
2011	"Act Yr Age"	Australian Video of the Year	Nominated
2013	"SOS"	Australian Video of the Year	Nominated
