= Illusive Sounds =

Illusive Group
- Founded: 2003
- Founder: Matt Gudinski/Adam Jankie
- Country of origin: Australia
- Official website: http://www.illusive.com.au

Illusive Group is an Australian independent record label and management and touring company that represents acts including Bliss n Eso, Lowrider, Stonefield, Owl Eyes, Clubfeet, Diafrix, Lurch & Chief and Lila Gold.

== History ==
Founded in 2003 by Matt Gudinski & Adam Jankie, Illusive has operations within all areas of the music industry – including a record label, touring company, a boutique booking agency and management business.

== Record label/licensing ==
Illusive Sounds is a record label and marketing company which discovers and nurtures local talent. It has launched and grown the careers of contemporary acts in Australia, as well as paving the way and breaking down barriers at Australian radio and within the broader media community for contemporary music. Illusive Sounds licenses international products for release in Australia and New Zealand. Illusive is distributed in Australia and New Zealand by Universal Music.

== Touring division ==
Illusive's touring arm is responsible for a large percentage of urban and dance music tours landing on Australia's shores. Illusive has led tours for international artists, from club shows through to full arenas. Past tours include international artists such as The Roots, Lupe Fiasco, Bruno Mars, Cypress Hill, Clipse, Talib Kweli and 50 Cent through to DJs like Spinderella, Baio (Vampire Weekend), Gorillaz DJs, Miike Snow DJs, Cash Money, Q-Bert and many more; alongside the countless one-off shows Illusive have promoted in individual Australian cities which include names like Ladyhawke, LMFAO, Shwayze, Mark Farina and Derrick Carter. In late 2010, Illusive were behind the country's biggest ever under-18s festival, Another World, which will become an annual event.

== Artist Voice ==
Illusive's Director, Matt Gudinski, partnered with Australia's premier booking agent, Brett Murrihy, to create the Artist Voice agency in 2010. The booking roster includes Empire of the Sun, The Temper Trap, Gypsy & the Cat, Howling Bells, The Naked & Famous, Bliss N Eso and Little Red. Artist Voice is setting up an international representation department to promote foreign artists within Australia and New Zealand to provide a local advantage.

== Merchandise ==
Illusive represents and handles the day-to-day operation and activity of merchandise for local artists along with international touring artists. Illusive's merchandise division has branched out into online fulfilment and has a system in place to handle all elements of online sales that management and artists now require.

== Illusive Media ==
ACCLAIM is Australia's only dedicated street lifestyle and culture magazine along with its online component, acclaimmag.com. The magazine is distributed in several countries. ACCLAIM began in 2006.

== Artists ==
The following artists are signed to the Illusive Sounds roster:

- Bliss n Eso
- Downsyde
- Lowrider
- Paris Wells
- X & Hell
- True Live
- Diafrix
- Metals
- Clubfeet
- Stonefield
- Owl Eyes
- Lurch & Chief
- Lila Gold

== See also ==
- Lists of record labels
