= Maniac 2000 =

2000 single by Mark McCabe

Single by Mark McCabe
- Released: 11 February 2000
- Recorded: November 1999
- Studio: Clontarf Cricket Club
- Length: 4:02
- Label: Abbey Discs
- Songwriters: Al Gibbs, Simon Fitzpatrick, Tim Hannigan, Mark McCabe, Michael Sembello, Dennis Matkosky
- Producers: Simon Fitzpatrick, Tim Hannigan

Mark McCabe singles chronology
"Maniac 2000" (2000)	"Love Is in the Air 2001" (2001)

"Maniac 2000" is a song credited to Mark McCabe, and released as a single in February 2000. It was produced by Simon Fitzpatrick and Tim Hannigan. The song consists of McCabe rapping over the 1995 track "Maniac (Sound Crowd Remix)" by Irish act 4 Rhythm, which itself interpolates Michael Sembello's 1983 hit "Maniac". 4 Rhythm's "Maniac" was an Irish top 30 hit for Redeye Records, and was also produced by both Fitzpatrick and Hannigan.

"Maniac 2000" reached number one on the Irish Singles Chart, staying at the top position for 10 weeks, from 4 March to 6 May 2000. It was Ireland's best-selling single of 2000 and is the fifth-best-selling single in the history of the chart. "Maniac 2000" has achieved cult status in Ireland. The song won best single at the national Meteor Music Awards in 2001. Despite the success the song experienced, it was not a hit in other countries, stalling at number 137 on the UK Singles Chart in late March. In 2015, on the 15th anniversary of its release, "Maniac 2000" re-entered the Irish Singles Chart at number 12.

== Background ==
Mark McCabe received his secondary education at Wesley College Dublin, this school allowed for his musical talent to flourish. McCabe was a DJ working at Dublin pirate radio station Pulse FM. As part of his sets, he would rap over the instrumental Sound Crowd version of 4 Rhythm's "Maniac", which led to demands that he record his version. McCabe was told by a local record shop owner that customers would come in each day requesting a copy of the song. McCabe recorded the song in the Clontarf Cricket Club in front of a live audience.

== Charts ==
=== Weekly charts ===
Chart (2000)	Peak position
Ireland (IRMA)	1
Ireland Dance (IRMA)	1
UK Singles (OCC)	137

Chart (2007)	Peak position
Ireland (IRMA)	23

Chart (2015)	Peak position
Ireland (IRMA)	12

=== Year-end charts ===
Chart (2000)	Position
Ireland (IRMA)	1

=== All-time charts ===
Chart	Position
Ireland (IRMA)	5
