= Maniac (Michael Sembello song) =

1983 single by Michael Sembello

- Side-A label of U.S. single

Single by Michael Sembello

from the album Bossa Nova Hotel and Flashdance: Original Soundtrack from the Motion Picture
- B-side: "Maniac" (instrumental)
- Released: May 1983
- Recorded: 1983
- Genre: Synth-pop; dance-pop; hi-NRG
- Length: 4:04 (soundtrack version); 4:13 (7-inch single/album version); 5:57 (12-inch single version)
- Label: Warner Bros.; Casablanca
- Songwriters: Dennis Matkosky; Michael Sembello
- Producers: Phil Ramone; Michael Sembello

Michael Sembello singles chronology
"Maniac" (1983)	"Automatic Man" (1983)

"Maniac" is a song by American musician Michael Sembello, co-written with Dennis Matkosky, and best known for its inclusion on the soundtrack of the 1983 film Flashdance. Originally conceived as a darkly humorous track inspired by a television report concerning a serial killer, and the 1980 horror film Maniac, the song was later rewritten with new lyrics at the request of Flashdance director Adrian Lyne and music supervisor Phil Ramone to better align with the film's narrative about a young dancer's intense training and ambition. The revised version was featured prominently in a key sequence of the film, accompanying a montage of the protagonist's home workout routine.

Following the unexpected commercial success of Flashdance, Paramount Pictures produced a music video for "Maniac" using scenes from the film, which premiered on MTV in May 1983. The video's heavy rotation helped propel the single to number one on the Billboard Hot 100, where it remained for two weeks, and contributed to the film's broader cultural impact. The success of "Maniac" played a significant role in establishing the music video as a viable and powerful tool for promoting motion pictures. The song earned multiple Grammy nominations and was included on Sembello's debut album, Bossa Nova Hotel, though he distanced himself from attempts to replicate its style. "Maniac" later inspired cover versions and remixes, including a 2000 Irish hit that became one of the country's best-selling singles of all time.

== Composition and recording ==
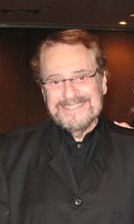
Phil Ramone produced the song with Sembello.

The general concept for what became the Flashdance hit came to songwriter Dennis Matkosky while watching a news report about a serial killer. He jokingly thought, "With my luck, this guy lives next door to me," and immediately jotted down the lyrics that came to mind: "He's a maniac. He just moved in next door. He'll kill your cat and nail it to the floor." He took the idea to his friend Michael Sembello, whose eyes widened with interest when he heard the title. As soon as Matkosky was seated at a piano, Sembello said, "All right. Hit the weirdest chord you know," and they began composing the music. Their inspiration for the bridge came from the Bloodrock song "D.O.A.", a number 36 hit on the Billboard Hot 100 in 1971 that recreated the two-tone siren used on ambulances in the United Kingdom at that time, and Sembello came up with the idea of using "Chopsticks" to introduce the instrumental portion of the song. Matkosky said, "We thought it was a joke because we weren't trying to write a song. We were trying to make our friends laugh."

Sembello recalled their usual process for situations where they needed more lyrics: "Whenever we get an idea, we start researching, but we didn't have Google." Matkosky found the 1980 slasher film Maniac and rented it to see if they could come up with more to put in the song. It did provide the additional lyrics they wanted, but the demo they recorded wound up on a tape sent to Phil Ramone, who was looking for songs to use in Flashdance. During the film's pre-production, the two-tone siren music used in the bridge stood out for the film's director, Adrian Lyne, who said, "One of the tunes I'd heard had a kind of a chime in it, that kind of 'bing-bong-bing-bong-bing-bong', like that, and I said, 'Let's use that. Let's use that as a kind of a motive, as a kind of a driving thing for a dance.'" Lyne had grown accustomed to using the music by the end of filming and wanted it in the final cut, so Ramone asked for lyrics to fit the movie and had Sembello re-record the song.

== Music video ==
Before Flashdance was released on April 15, 1983, its distributor Paramount Pictures had doubts that it would do well at the box office. The May 7 issue of Cash Box, however, reported on the surprise success of the film and Paramount's plan to have Lyne take parts of scenes from it to create music videos to be shown on the cable channel MTV as well as on television programs and at other venues featuring such clips. "Maniac" was listed on the reports that MTV provided to Billboard that indicated what videos were in rotation on the cable network and made its first appearance there in the May 21 issue, which indicated that it had been added to their playlist as of May 11.

== Release and commercial performance ==
The June 4, 1983, issue of Billboard magazine included the first appearance of the 7-inch single of "Maniac" on the Billboard Hot 100, where it spent 22 weeks, and the September 10 Billboard marked its first of 2 weeks as the most popular song in the US. It reached number 34 during its 8 weeks on the magazine's Top Rock Tracks chart that began in the July 30 issue, and also made a number 34 showing over the course of 9 weeks on the Adult Contemporary chart as of the September 3 Billboard. Their September 10 Chartbeat column bemoaned the latter appearance as a "sign of the times", noting that "AC clearly isn't just for Anne Murray anymore", an uncannily prescient assessment considering that the song went to number 1 on the Adult Contemporary and pop charts in Murray's native Canada just weeks later. It also made the top 10 on the pop charts in Australia, Germany, the Netherlands, New Zealand, Spain, and Switzerland. The 12-inch remix began 15 weeks on the Dance/Disco Top 80 in the June 25 Billboard and eventually got as high as number 6.

== Critical reception ==
Michael Sembello - "Maniac"
The soundtrack version "opens with a fast disco drum machine beat… frantic synthesizers and a pulsating bass line."

"Maniac" was selected as the best song on the soundtrack album by the editors of Digital Audio's Guide to Compact Discs, who described how "it opens with a fast disco drum machine beat, augmented by frantic synthesizers and a pulsating bass line." In their retrospective reviews, AllMusic labeled the song as one of their Album Picks from the Flashdance soundtrack and the 1994 Casablanca Records Story compilation.

== Awards and accolades ==
As a single, "Maniac" earned Sembello Grammy nominations for Record of the Year with Ramone, Best Pop Vocal Performance, Male as an artist, and a nomination with Matkosky for Song of the Year. As part of the Flashdance soundtrack, it gave them and all of the songwriters who contributed to the album the Grammy Award for Best Album of Original Score Written for a Motion Picture or a Television Special, and Sembello was also nominated alongside all of the other performers on the soundtrack for Album of the Year. "Maniac" was nominated for the Academy Award and Golden Globe for Best Original Song, and the music video for "Maniac" was awarded Best Editing at Billboard magazine's Video Music Awards.

== Live performances ==
Some of Sembello's appearances to promote "Maniac" included programs where performers would lip sync to the hit recording of their song, such as Solid Gold, where he appeared on June 18, and American Bandstand, which included a brief interview of him by Dick Clark, on September 10. At the 56th Academy Awards on April 9, 1984, the song was performed live by Lani Hall with Herb Alpert & the Tijuana Brass.

== Legacy and influence ==
The extensive exposure that the "Maniac" video received from MTV and other outlets helped Paramount plug Flashdance for free instead of paying the several million dollars of commercial time for the standard television advertising exposure needed to get the same result. Paramount vice president Gordon Weaver described this approach as "invisible marketing". Flashdance went on to be the third highest-grossing film of 1983 in the US despite having unknown actors and receiving bad reviews, so the new priority for studio marketing departments became evaluating how practical it would be to include popular music in the projects they were looking to release in order to receive similar benefits from such outlets.

== Aftermath ==
In 1983, Sembello said, "It's a funny irony that it caught on so, especially since I don't dance and have never even been to a disco." Later he expressed pride in having a number one record after working in the business for so many years, cautioning, "But, hey, let it die. 'Maniac' was just a song, and now I'm on to the next, and I don't want to rip off the record-buying public by doing a carbon-copy of 'Maniac' just to make some money." He chose to continue working with Ramone on his debut album, Bossa Nova Hotel, which included his number one single and gave him two more U.S. chart hits: the number 34 Hot 100 entry "Automatic Man" and "Talk", which reached number 25 on the Adult Contemporary chart.

In May 2010, Maniac director William Lustig interviewed Sembello and Matkosky to clear up the misconception that his film was what began the process of writing their song of the same name, and they confirmed that the story of how the song originated had been retold incorrectly over the years.

== Personnel ==
Personnel adapted from the liner notes of the album Bossa Nova Hotel:

- Michael Sembello – vocals, guitar, keyboard bass, producer
- Dennis Matkosky – keyboards, synthesizer
- Carlos Vega – Simmons drums
- Dennis Karmazyn – cello
- Phil Ramone – producer

12-inch remix

Credits adapted from the liner notes of the 12-inch single:

- John "Jellybean" Benitez – remixing
- Jay Mark – engineer

== Charts ==
=== Weekly charts ===
Chart (1983)	Peak position
Australia (Kent Music Report)	2
Belgium (Ultratop 50 Flanders)	11
Canada Adult Contemporary (RPM)	1
Canada Top Singles (RPM)	1
Ireland (IRMA)	28
Netherlands (Dutch Top 40)	11
Netherlands (Single Top 100)	10
New Zealand (Recorded Music NZ)	7
South Africa (Springbok Radio)	22
Spain (AFYVE)	2
Switzerland (Schweizer Hitparade)	2
UK Singles (Official Charts)	43
US Billboard Adult Contemporary	34
US Billboard Hot 100	1
US Billboard Hot Dance Club Play	6
US Billboard Top Rock Tracks	34
US Cash Box	3
West Germany (GfK)	6

Chart (2020)	Peak position
Poland Airplay (ZPAV)	57

=== Year-end charts ===
Chart (1983)	Rank
Australia (Kent Music Report)	39
Canada Top Singles (RPM)	13
US Billboard Hot 100	9
US Cash Box	18
West Germany (Official German Charts)	58

== Certifications ==
Region	Certification	Certified units/sales
Canada (Music Canada)	Platinum	100,000^{^}
Denmark (IFPI Danmark)	Platinum	90,000^{‡}
Germany (BVMI)	Gold	300,000^{‡}
Italy (FIMI)	Gold	25,000^{‡}
New Zealand (RMNZ)	Platinum	30,000^{‡}
Spain (Promusicae)	Platinum	60,000^{‡}
United Kingdom (BPI)	Gold	400,000^{‡}
^{^} Shipments figures based on certification alone.^{‡} Sales+streaming figures based on certification alone.

== Other versions ==
Irish rave act 4 Rhythm made a recording of "Maniac" in 1994 that replaced the verses with a more contemporary rap, but the publishers of the original, Warner Chappell Music, "weren't happy with the change of lyrics and blocked the release". They did allow a 4 Rhythm version in which the original verses were rapped, and that recording reached number 28 in 1995, the same peak position that Sembello achieved, on the Irish Singles Chart. "Maniac 2000", a performance of Mark McCabe rapping over the 4 Rhythm version, spent ten weeks at number one on the Irish Singles Chart and became the country's fifth biggest-selling single of all time.

== See also ==
- List of Billboard Hot 100 number-one singles of 1983
- List of number-one singles of 1983 (Canada)

== Bibliography ==
- Bronson, Fred (2003). The Billboard Book of Number One Hits. Billboard Books. ISBN 9780823076772.
- Canale, Larry, ed. (1986). Digital Audio's Guide to Compact Discs. Bantam Books. ISBN 0-553-34356-4.
- Eszterhas, Joe (2010). Hollywood Animal: A Memoir. Knopf Doubleday Publishing Group. ISBN 9780307530875.
- O'Neil, Thomas (1999). The Grammys. Perigree Books. ISBN 0-39952-477-0.
- O'Neil, Thomas (2003). Movie Awards: The Ultimate, Unofficial Guide to the Oscars, Golden Globes, Critics, Guild & Indie Honors. Perigree Books. ISBN 978-0-39952-922-1.
- Whitburn, Joel (2004). Joel Whitburn's Hot Dance/Disco, 1974–2003. Record Research Inc. ISBN 978-0-89820-156-7.
- Whitburn, Joel (2007). Joel Whitburn Presents Billboard Top Adult Songs, 1961–2006. Record Research Inc. ISBN 978-0-89820-169-7.
- Whitburn, Joel (2008). Joel Whitburn Presents Rock Tracks, 1981–2008. Record Research Inc. ISBN 978-0898201741.
- Whitburn, Joel (2009). Joel Whitburn's Top Pop Singles, 1955–2008. Record Research Inc. ISBN 978-0-89820-180-2.
- Wiley, Mason; Bona, Damien (1996). Inside Oscar: The Unofficial History of the Academy Awards. Ballantine Books. ISBN 0-345-40053-4.
