= Bitter Pill =

Bitter Pill may refer to:

== Music ==
Albums

- Bitter Pill (album), 2015 album by Irish singer-songwriter Gavin James

Songs

- "Bitter Pill", a song by Soul Asylum from the 1990 album And the Horse They Rode In On
- "The Bitter Pill" (Warrant song), 1992
- "Bitter Pill", a song by Mötley Crüe from the 1998 album Greatest Hits
- "This Bitter Pill", a song by Dashboard Confessional from the 2001 album The Places You Have Come to Fear the Most
- "Bitter Pill" (Siobhan Fahey song), 2002
- "Bitter Pill", a song by Annie Lennox from the 2003 album Bare
- "The Bitter Pill", a song by The Pineapple Thief from the 2003 album Variations on a Dream
- "Bitter Pill", a song by Silent Civilian from the 2006 album Rebirth of the Temple
- "Bitter Pill", a song by DevilDriver from the 2009 album Pray for Villains
- "Bitter Pill", a song by Gavin James from the 2016 album Bitter Pill

== Other ==
- The Bitter Pill, a 1974 novel by A. Bertram Chandler
- Bitter Pills, a book by Hans-Peter Martin
- Bitter Pill: Why Medical Bills Are Killing Us, a 2015 book by Steven Brill
- Side Effects (2013 film), a 2013 film which had the working title of The Bitter Pill
- "A Bitter Pill", an episode of Traders
- Bitter Pills, a name used by 22-20s for secret gigs
