= Nervous (Gavin James song) =

2015 song by Gavin James

Single by Gavin James

from the album Bitter Pill
- Released: 2015
- Recorded: 2015
- Length: 3:36
- Songwriter: Gavin James
- Producer: Marc Carolan

"Nervous (The Ooh Song) (Mark McCabe Remix)"

Single by Gavin James
- Released: June 2016
- Recorded: 2015
- Length: 3:15
- Label: Good Soldier / Believe (Sony)
- Songwriter: Gavin James
- Producer: Mark McCabe

"Nervous" is a song by Irish singer-songwriter Gavin James, released as the fifth single from his 2015 album Bitter Pill. The ballad went gold in Denmark and France, and platinum in Sweden and the Netherlands.

A music video was released, directed by Christian Tierney.

== Track listing ==
1. "Nervous" – 3:36
2. "Nervous" (Acoustic) – 4:11

== "Nervous (The Ooh Song)" ==
In 2016, Irish music producer, radio and club DJ Mark McCabe remixed the song. Retitled "Nervous (The Ooh Song) (Mark McCabe Remix)", it was released in June 2016 and found renewed international chart success, charting in Belgium and Sweden. A separate music video distinct from the original was released for the remix. The new video was directed by Raja Virdi and edited by Dylan Holmes Williams.

== Charts ==
=== Weekly charts ===
Chart (2016–17)	Peak position
Belgium (Ultratip Bubbling Under Flanders) Nervous (The Ooh Song) [Mark McCabe Remix]	4
Belgium (Ultratop 50 Wallonia)	47
France (SNEP)	10
Ireland (IRMA)	28
Netherlands (Dutch Top 40) Nervous (The Ooh Song) [Mark McCabe Remix]	5
Netherlands (Single Top 100) Nervous (The Ooh Song) [Mark McCabe Remix]	20
Norway (VG-lista)	5
Sweden (Sverigetopplistan)	17
UK Singles (OCC)	79

=== Year-end charts ===
Chart (2016)	Position
Netherlands (Dutch Top 40)	71
Chart (2017)	Position
Netherlands (Dutch Top 40)	76

== Certifications ==
Region	Certification	Certified units/sales
Australia (ARIA)	Platinum	70,000^{‡}
Denmark (IFPI Danmark)	Gold	45,000^{‡}
France (SNEP)	Gold	66,666^{‡}
Italy (FIMI)	Gold	25,000^{‡}
Netherlands (NVPI)	Platinum	30,000^{‡}
New Zealand (RMNZ)	Gold	15,000^{‡}
Norway (IFPI Norway)	3× Platinum	180,000^{‡}
Spain (Promusicae)	Gold	30,000^{‡}
Sweden (GLF)	Platinum	40,000^{‡}
United Kingdom (BPI)	Silver	200,000^{‡}
^{‡} Sales+streaming figures based on certification alone.
