= Jennifer Batten =

American multi-genre guitarist (born 1957)

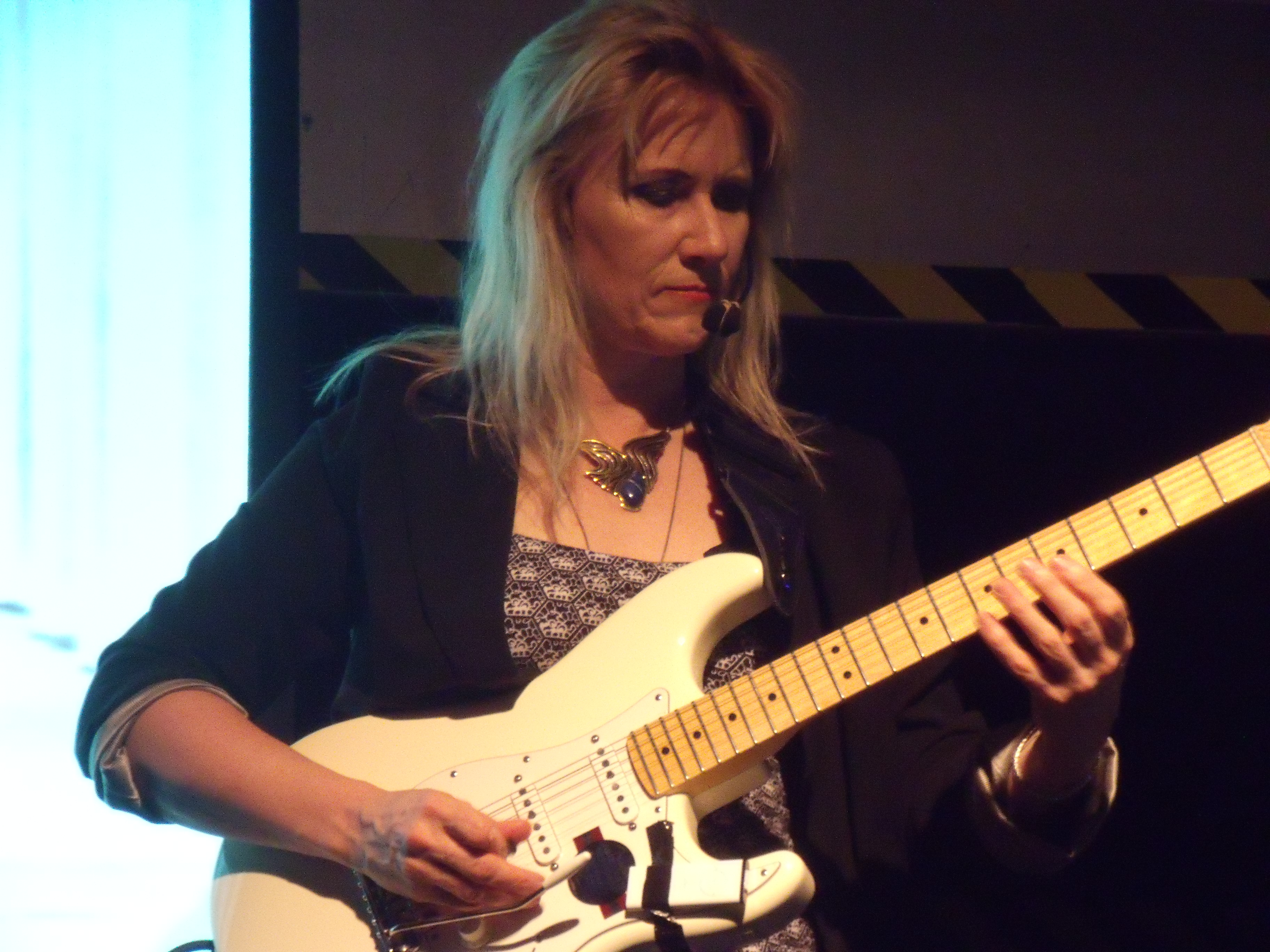
- Batten performing in 2010

Background information
- Born: November 29, 1957 (age 68); New York City, New York, U.S.
- Genres: Instrumental rock; jazz fusion; hard rock; electronic; worldbeat
- Occupations: Musician; songwriter; producer; filmmaker; visual artist
- Instruments: Guitar; guitar synthesizer
- Years active: 1980–present
- Labels: Voss; East West; Lion
- Website: www.jenniferbatten.com

Jennifer Batten (born November 29, 1957) is an American electric guitar virtuoso who has worked as a session musician and solo artist, emerging mainly in the 1980s. From 1987 to 1997, she played on all three of Michael Jackson's world tours as his lead guitarist, and from 1999 to 2001, she toured and recorded with Jeff Beck.

Batten has released three solo studio albums: her 1992 debut, Above Below and Beyond, the worldbeat-influenced Jennifer Batten's Tribal Rage: Momentum in 1997, and Whatever, which was released on CD and DVD in Japan in 2007 and worldwide in 2008. Batten continues to tour the globe, playing with bands, performing solo shows, and working clinics and master classes.

== Early years ==
Batten's musical journey started at a young age. She was inspired by watching the Beatles US television debut in 1964 and was jealous of her older sister having a guitar. At the age of eight, Batten's father bought her a "killer red and blue electric" and taught her her first song, Forest Flower, by saxophonist Charles Lloyd. With this guitar, she explored various genres and techniques. Some of her early influences included the Beatles, B.B. King, Lightnin' Hopkins, and Jeff Beck. The New York native moved with her family to San Diego in 1969.

After failing her first audition to enroll at the Guitar Institute of Technology (GIT) in Los Angeles, she practiced for six months with Peter Sprague to bring her jazz chops up to par. After working relentlessly on major and minor scales and learning Charlie Parker saxophone solos on guitar, Batten re-auditioned and became the only woman enrolled at GIT at the time. Batten started to experiment with the two-handed tapping technique in 1978, having been inspired by GIT classmate Steve Lynch (who ended up playing for the band Autograph) while attending the Musicians Institute. In 1979, Batten became the first woman to graduate from GIT, where she won two awards. She also became the first woman to teach at GIT after graduating, where she also played in a variety of local bands. Batten had never played in a band until after graduating from GIT when she was 21 because her mother would not let her go out and play with strangers. Batten's skills were evident as early as the 1980s, when she was the guitarist for Purl, a San Diego club band. Her versatility was on display due to her ability to play various genres such as rock, pop, blues, jazz and funk. Later, Batten would be one in a long list of San Diego musicians who moved north to Los Angeles to find success.

The name Jennifer Batten grew when she auditioned and was selected from over 100 guitarists to play with Michael Jackson on his "Bad" tour across the globe. For her audition, Batten improvised a funky rhythm guitar, soloed freestyle, and performed an unaccompanied guitar version of Coltrane's Giant Steps. She had rearranged it as an Eddie Van Halen-styled tapping solo which would later end up on her first solo album. She had auditioned for Jackson's band in Los Angeles where she moved from San Diego in 1984. Michael Jackson's "Bad" tour lasted for a year and a half, reaching over 4.5 million people. She had never been outside the US until her first concert with Jackson in Tokyo. Overall, Batten performed with the King of Pop on all his solo tours which spanned a decade. She is perhaps best known for her work with Michael Jackson.

== Musical career ==
Batten played lead guitar and rhythm guitar on Michael Jackson's Bad (1987–1989), Dangerous (1992) and HIStory (1996–1997) world tours. She also appeared in the 1993 Super Bowl halftime performance with Michael Jackson which was aired to over 1.5 billion people across 80 countries, making it the largest audience in television history for a live music performance. While on the Dangerous Tour, Batten found Jeff Beck, English guitar legend and Batten's idol from her teenage years, and gave him her first CD. Beck called her back a few months later, asking her to join him on tour in 1998. She was in Jeff Beck's touring band for three years and appears on his albums Who Else! (1999) andYou Had It Coming. Beck's bands for the 30 years before Batten had never featured a female instrumentalist.

After completing Michael Jackson's Bad Tour, Batten began working on her debut album, Above, Below, and Beyond which was released on February 8th, 1992. This album was produced by former Stevie Wonder guitarist Michael Sembello. She later created 2 more solo CDs, demonstrating a range of genres between her 3 albums, including world beat and rock n' roll to electronica.

While on tour with Michael Jackson, Batten encountered confusion for both her guitar style and onstage appearance. Her musical style of virtuoso hard rock lead guitar was most associated with men, and her fashion sense was similar to male guitarists in the glam metal genre of the era. Batten stated "it's a shock for some people to see a woman playing the guitar. All over the world, on the Michael Jackson tour, people would ask me whether I was a man or woman. Just because I played guitar, they assumed I was a guy." Some observers believed Batten was a man who looked like a woman, rather than accept she was female.

Between 1994 and 1999, Batten worked with Dave Rodgers and Domino as featured guitarist on the Eurobeat songs "Sun City", "Music For the People", "Fly" and "Woa Woa Woa." Her writing and performing is uncredited on several other songs under the A-Beat C label. Her live Eurobeat appearances were limited to playing at the Tokyo Dome with Rodgers and Queen of Hearts.

Batten has appeared on recordings such as Jeff Beck's Who Else! (1999) and You Had It Coming (2001) as well as Michael Sembello's Heavy Weather (1992). Her music video appearances include Jeff Beck ("Live in Japan"), Michael Jackson's "Moonwalker" ("Come Together"), Natalie Cole ("Wild Women Do"), Sara Hickman's "Take It Like a Man", Miguel Mateos' "Obsesión", and Jason Becker's "Some Assembly Required". She appears on the 2004 album Spin the Bottle: An All-Star Tribute to Kiss, with Lemmy Kilmister and Samantha Maloney, performing "Shout It Out Loud". In 2010, she recorded a solo for the song "Bad Girls" by Polish singer Doda.

In 2017, she partnered on a melodic rock CD with vocalist Marc Scherer and producer Jim Peterik (formerly of Survivor) which was released in September, entitled Scherer Batten - BattleZone. All songs were written or co-written by Peterik. Special guests included saxophonist Mindi Abair and Chicago vocalist Bill Champlin. The song "Space and Time" was co-written with John Wetton, and "All Roads" was co-written with Sammy Hagar. Batten made videos for all songs on her YouTube channel.

More recently, Batten held guitar residency for the Cirque Du Soleil show Zumanity in Las Vegas.

== Other work ==
Batten has written two music books: Two Hand Rock (published by Hal Leonard) and The Transcribed Guitar Solos of Peter Sprague (self-published).

She also has three instructional DVD/download courses available from TrueFire: Rock Sauce for Lead Guitar, Rock Sauce for Rhythm Guitar, and 50 Ultra Intervallic Guitar Licks You Must Know. They provide her insights on the instrument and help educate the next generation of guitarists.

Batten continues to play and speak at clinics such as the Schorndorf annual German workshop or guitar festivals like the Larvik Guitar Festival. Batten covers a range of topics, including guitar questions to travel issues and her own experiences. When young guitarists ask Batten for advice, she tells them "Keep your nose to the grindstone, work on your music, and the career will take care of itself."

In the summer of 2015, Batten gave a series of seminars called Self-Empowerment For The Modern Musician Experience. These seminars discussed many different topics such as practical tools to help musicians make the most of their skills, optimizing revenue streams, and creating a work-life balance.

Batten appeared as a guest for the "50 Years of Jeff Beck" anniversary concert at the Hollywood Bowl on August 10th, 2016. This event celebrated this revered and legendary guitarist's five decades of music.

In 2019, Batten worked with Rodrigo Teaser for a tribute to Michael Jackson ten years after his death, titled 10 years without Michael Jackson. For this show, Batten was joined LaVelle Smith Jr., who was Jackson's choreographer and dancer for more than 20 years.

Since 2021, Batten is part of many of the shows in the world tour of a Michael Jackson musical called "This is Michael" with live performances in Europe and Latin America.

== Awards and recognition ==
In November 2011, Batten was featured on BBC Radio 4's series Joan Armatrading's More Guitar Favourites.

Her work was given the "She Rocks Icon Award" in January 2016 by the Women's International Music Network.

Batten has also been inducted into Guitar Player Magazine's Gallery of the Greats.

Her first tour in 2016 with Uli Jon Roth and Andy Timmons is known as The Ultimate Guitar Tour.

Batten co-hosted the 2025 She Rocks Awards with Lindsey Sterling.

== Personal life and Current Work ==
Batten enjoys creating stained and fused glass art, and steampunk art.

Batten currently lives in her adopted hometown of Portland, Oregon where she still performs with her current cover band, Jennifer Batten and Full Steam which began in early 2019. They cover a variety of genres of dance music from Michael Jackson, Prince, Hall and Oates, Huey Lewis, Toto, Van Halen, Foreigner, Journey, Peter Gabriel and more.

== Discography ==
=== Solo albums ===
- 1992: Above Below and Beyond
- 1997: Jennifer Batten's Tribal Rage: Momentum
- 2007: Whatever

=== Guest appearances ===
- 1990: Shortstop – Sara Hickman (Elektra)
- 1990: Girl's Life – The Rainbow Girls (Red Distribution)
- 1990: Obsesion – Miguel Mateos (Sony BMG)
- 1991: Small Town Girl – Cindy Cruse (Frontline Records)
- 1992: Heavy Weather – Michael Sembello (Polydor)
- 1993: Guitar's Practicing Musicians – various artists (Guitar Recordings)
- 1994: Sunlight Again – Carl Anderson (GRP Records)
- 1995: Earthtones – Thom Teresi (Rhombus)
- 1995: Guitar Zeus – Carmine Appice (No Bull Records)
- 1995: The Immigrants - One Planet Under One Groove (USG/ZYX)
- 1997: Einstein Was a Bullfighter – Doc Tahri (Sumething Else)
- 1999: Who Else! – Jeff Beck (Epic)
- 2001: You Had It Coming, Jeff Beck, (Epic)
- 2003: Lost Years – Michael Sembello (Frontiers Records)
- 2005: All Star Tribute to Cher (Cleopatra)
- 2004: Live in Bucharest: The Dangerous Tour
- 2005: Secondhand Smoke - A Tribute to Frank Marino (Wildmess Records)
- 2008: Clean – Dave Martone (Magna Carta)
- 2009: Unexpected Fate – Bulldozer (Scarlet)
- 2010: It's Important – Dino Fiorenza (Fog Foundation)
- 2011: Glenn Eric – Glenn Eric Meganck (Beachfront)
- 2011: Japan Live 1999, Jeff Beck (IMV Blueline)
- 2011: Embrace the Sun - Japan Benefit Album (Lion Music)
- 2012: Live at Wembley July 16, 1988, Michael Jackson (Epic)
- 2016: 50 Years of Beck at the Hollywood Bowl
- 2017: Battle Zone – Scherer/Batten (Melodic Rock Records)
- 2018: Rainbow Rocket Ride – Svenson (Route Note)
- 2019: Brand New Start - Black Sand (Black Sand Records)
- 2021: Legend of Valley Doom Part 3 - Marius Danielsen's Legend of Valley Doom (guitar solo on track 8: "The Sarlinian Bow")
