= Bossa Nova Hotel =

- Standard artwork

Studio album by Michael Sembello
- Released: September 1983
- Recorded: 1983
- Studio: Rumbo Recorders (Los Angeles); Soundcastle (Los Angeles); Westlake Audio (Los Angeles); EFX Studios (Burbank)
- Genre: Rock; pop rock; hi-NRG
- Length: 39:53
- Label: Warner Bros.
- Producer: Phil Ramone; Michael Sembello

Michael Sembello chronology
| Bossa Nova Hotel (1983) | Without Walls (1986) |

Singles from Bossa Nova Hotel
- 1. "Maniac" Released: May 1983; 2. "Automatic Man" Released: September 1983; 3. "Talk" Released: January 1984

Professional ratings
Review scores
| Source | Rating |
|---|---|
| AllMusic | 4.5/5 stars |

Bossa Nova Hotel is the 1983 debut album of rock singer/guitarist Michael Sembello. The album was a continuation of the work that Sembello began with producer Phil Ramone on "Maniac," which became a number one US pop hit after it was featured in the film Flashdance and on its soundtrack album. Bossa Nova Hotel peaked at number 80 on the US album chart and included the soundtrack hit in addition to two more chart entries, "Automatic Man" and "Talk."

== Background ==
Songwriters Michael Sembello and Dennis Matkosky recorded a demo of a song titled "Maniac" that they had written after Matkosky watched a news report about a serial killer, and the tape landed in the hands of Phil Ramone, who was looking for songs to use in the film Flashdance. After changing the lyrics, a new version of "Maniac" recorded by Sembello was released on the soundtrack album and went to number one on the Billboard Hot 100 in the summer of 1983. The singer-songwriter chose to work with Ramone on his debut album because he felt they were a good match. Having worked with so many producers over the years as a session musician, he knew how inflexible they could be, but Ramone was different. "Phil is just about as nuts as I am and will try anything, which is great." On the material itself, he said, "I wanted to take some of the elements of Brazilian music and fuse them with pop,… kind of the way The Police have done with reggae."

== Release and reception ==
Bossa Nova Hotel was released by Warner Bros. Records in September 1983 and debuted on Billboard magazine's Top LPs & Tape chart in the issue dated October 8. During a 10-week run, it reached number 80.

"Automatic Man", the first official single from the album, debuted on the Billboard Hot 100 in the September 24, 1983, issue, and peaked at number 34 over the course of 10 weeks. The second single – a duet with his wife Cruz called "Talk" – started its 10 weeks on the magazine's Adult Contemporary chart in the February 4, 1984, issue and got as high as number 25.

J. D. Considine wrote in Musician: "You could sum up Sembello's sound as Michael McDonald with a rhythm machine, but that would be unnecessarily cruel to McDonald. And the rhythm machine."

The album was re-issued in 2007 on CD by Wounded Bird Records.

== Track listing ==
| No. | Title | Writer(s) | Length |
|---|---|---|---|
| 1. | "Automatic Man" | David Batteau, Michael Sembello, Danny Sembello | 4:13 |
| 2. | "First Time" | Batteau, Don Freeman, M. Sembello | 3:04 |
| 3. | "Cowboy" | Batteau, M. Sembello, D. Sembello | 3:35 |
| 4. | "It's Over" | Alfred Rubalcava, M. Sembello | 4:56 |
| 5. | "Maniac" | Dennis Matkosky, M. Sembello | 4:18 |
| 6. | "Godzilla" | Phil Ramone, M. Sembello, D. Sembello | 3:50 |
| 7. | "Talk" | M. Sembello, D. Sembello | 3:26 |
| 8. | "Cadillac" | M. Sembello | 4:11 |
| 9. | "Lay Back" | M. Sembello | 4:02 |
| 10. | "Superman" | M. Sembello | 4:36 |

Reissue bonus tracks
| No. | Title | Writer(s) | Length |
|---|---|---|---|
| 11. | "Summer Lovers" | M. Sembello, Batteau, Matkosky | 3:40 |
| 12. | "Maniac" (Live) | Matkosky, M. Sembello | 4:51 |
| 13. | "Automatic Man" (Live) | Batteau, M. Sembello, D. Sembello | 5:00 |

== Charts ==
| Chart (1983) | Peak position |
|---|---|
| US Billboard 200 | 80 |

== Personnel ==
Vocalists and musicians

- Michael Sembello – vocals, guitar solo (1, 5, 6), synthesized bass (1, 5), backing vocals (1, 8, 9), guitars (2, 8), bass (2, 10), synthesizers (4), acoustic guitar (4), marimba solo (4), LinnDrum (6, 10), horn arrangements (6), synthesizer solo (8), Fender Rhodes (10), vocal drone (10), string arrangements (10)
- Danny Sembello – acoustic piano (1, 8), synthesizers (1, 4, 8), synthesized bass (1, 3, 4, 6, 8), backing vocals (1), keyboards (3, 6, 7, 9), tack piano solo (3), marimba (6)
- Chris Page – additional synthesizers (1), sound effects (3, 6, 10), horn arrangements (6), string arrangements and conductor (10)
- Don Freeman – keyboards (2)
- George Johnsen – sound effects (3)
- Dennis Matkosky – keyboards (5), synthesizers (5)
- George Duke – synthesizer solo (6)
- Phil Ramone – sound effects (10)
- Larry McNeely – banjo (3)
- Nathan Watts – bass (8, 9)
- Carlos Vega – drums (1, 8), Simmons drums (1, 2, 5)
- Vinnie Colaiuta – drums (3, 4, 7, 9)
- Paulinho da Costa – percussion (4, 6, 7, 9)
- Dennis Karmazyn – cello (5)
- Gary Herbig – horns (6)
- Bill Reichenbach Jr. – horns (6)
- Gary Grant – horns (6)
- Jerry Hey – horns (6)
- Oscar Castro-Neves – string arrangements and conductor (4, 7, 9)
- John Sembello – backing vocals (1), vocal drone (10)
- Cruz Baca Sembello – vocals (7), backing vocals (8, 9), vocal drone (10)
- Liza Miller – vocal drone (10)

Music programming

- Chris Page – synthesizer programming
- Ian Underwood – synthesizer programming
- Casey Young – synthesizer programming
- Steve Ripley – stereo guitar programming
- John Gilston – Simmons drum programming

=== Production ===
- Phil Ramone – producer
- Michael Sembello – producer (5)
- Peter Chaikin – recording
- Jim Gallagher – recording
- Thom Wilson – recording
- Tommy Vicari – mixing
- Geoff Gillette – additional engineer
- David Marquette – additional engineer
- Glenn Berkowitz – assistant engineer
- Bill Bottrell – assistant engineer
- Bino Espinoza – assistant engineer
- Matt Forger – assistant engineer
- Darwin Foye – assistant engineer
- Mitch Gibson – assistant engineer
- Jim Horn – assistant engineer
- Peter Kudas – assistant engineer
- Steve Reynolds – assistant engineer
- Bryan J. Rusenko – assistant engineer
- Stephen Schmidt – assistant engineer, digital tape editing
- Jeff Vaughn – assistant engineer
- Gene Wooley – assistant engineer
- Jay Antista – digital tape editing
- Roger Nichols – digital tape editing
- Bernie Grundman – digital tape editing, mastering
- Jim McKeever – equipment
- Jeff Lamont – production manager
- Richard Seireeni – art direction
- Simon Levy – contributing art director
- John Colao – photography
- Rob Lisee – set construction
- Lori Chapman – stylist
- Coelle – hair, make-up
- Marin Derek – hair, make-up
- Dan Kavanaugh – management

== Bibliography ==
- Bronson, Fred (2003), The Billboard Book of Number One Hits, Billboard Books, ISBN 9780823076772
- Whitburn, Joel (2007), Joel Whitburn Presents Billboard Top Adult Songs, 1961-2006, Record Research Inc., ISBN 978-0-89820-169-7
- Whitburn, Joel (2009), Joel Whitburn's Top Pop Singles, 1955-2008, Record Research Inc., ISBN 978-0-89820-180-2
- Whitburn, Joel (2010), Joel Whitburn Presents Top Pop Albums, Seventh Edition, Record Research Inc., ISBN 0-89820-183-7
