= Automatic Man (song) =

- Side-A label of U.S. 7-inch vinyl single

Single by Michael Sembello

from the album Bossa Nova Hotel
- B-side: "Summer Lovers"
- Released: September 1983
- Recorded: 1983
- Genre: Synth-pop
- Length: 3:57 (7-inch single version); 4:15 (album version); 6:59 (12" single version)
- Label: Warner Bros.
- Songwriters: Michael Sembello; David Batteau; Danny Sembello
- Producer: Phil Ramone

Michael Sembello singles chronology
"Maniac" (1983)	"Automatic Man" (1983)	"Talk" (1984)

"Automatic Man" is a song written by Michael Sembello, David Batteau, and Danny Sembello that was the first official single to be released from the 1983 album Bossa Nova Hotel by Michael Sembello. It reached number 34 on the Billboard Hot 100.

== Background ==
The second single released from the soundtrack album of the 1983 film Flashdance was Michael Sembello's "Maniac," which spent two weeks at number one on the Billboard Hot 100 that began in the magazine's September 10, 1983, issue. Sembello chose to continue to work with the co-producer of that song, Phil Ramone, on what would be his debut album, Bossa Nova Hotel. The first new single from the album, "Automatic Man", was narrated by the creator of the title character, a robot meant to stand in for the creator during romantic encounters that runs off with the creator's love interest in the end.

== Commercial performance ==
The September 24, 1983, issue of Billboard magazine included the first appearance of "Automatic Man" on the Billboard Hot 100, where it spent 10 weeks and peaked at number 34 in the November 5 issue. It also reached number 49 in Australia and number 66 in Germany.

== Critical reception ==
In Cash Box magazine's review of "Automatic Man," they wrote, "As with 'Maniac,' Sembello combines steady counterrhythms, a sure-footed melodic approach, and pleasingly offbeat fills and lyrics. A strong release from a significant artist." Billboard Dance Trax columnist Brian Chin opined that the song was the best dance cut on the album and that it "latches a dynamic Simmons drum beat onto a Doobie-ish track."

== Promotional appearance and video ==
Some of Sembello's appearances to promote "Automatic Man" included programs where performers would lip sync to the hit recording of their song, such as American Bandstand, which included a brief interview of him by Dick Clark, on September 10.

Unlike the video for "Maniac," which was a series of clips from Flashdance that were edited together by the film's director, Adrian Lyne, Sembello appeared in the music video for "Automatic Man," which had a plot that illustrated the lyrics of the song. The clip was listed on the reports that MTV provided to Billboard that indicated what videos were in rotation on the cable network and made its first appearance there in the November 12 issue, which indicated that it had been added to their playlist as of November 2.

== Personnel ==
Credits adapted from the liner notes of the album Bossa Nova Hotel:

- Michael Sembello – vocals, guitar solo, synthesizer bass, background vocals, producer
- Danny Sembello - synthesizer bass, piano, synthesizers, background vocals
- Carlos Vega - drums, Simmons drums
- Chris Page - additional synthesizer
- John Sembello – background vocals
- Phil Ramone – producer

12-inch remix

Credits adapted from the liner notes of the 12-inch single:

- Michael Sembello – remixing
- Thom Wilson – remixing
- Danny "Ho-Daddy" Keaton – remixing
- Bernie Grundman – mastering engineer
- George Johnsen/EFX Systems – sound effects

== Charts ==
Chart (1983)	Peak position
Australia (Kent Music Report)	49
Germany (GfK)	66
US Billboard Hot 100	34

== Bibliography ==
- Bronson, Fred (2003), The Billboard Book of Number One Hits, Billboard Books, ISBN 9780823076772
- Whitburn, Joel (2009), Joel Whitburn's Top Pop Singles, 1955-2008, Record Research Inc., ISBN 978-0-89820-180-2
