= Off the Grid (Bliss n Eso album) =

Studio album by Bliss n Eso
- Released: 28 April 2017
- Genre: Hip-hop
- Length: 58:37
- Label: Illusive Sounds
- Producer: DJ Izm, MC Bliss, MC Eso, Jon Hume

Bliss n Eso chronology
Circus in the Sky (2013)	Off the Grid (2017)	The Sun (2021)

Singles from Off The Grid
- 1. "Dopamine" Released: 28 September 2016; 2. "Friend Like You" Released: 6 December 2016; 3. "Moments" Released: 28 March 2017; 4. "Blue" Released: 14 April 2017; 5. "Believe" Released: 4 August 2017; 6. "Tear The Roof Off" Released: 2018

Off the Grid is the sixth studio album by the Australian hip-hop trio Bliss n Eso, following 2013's Circus in the Sky. It was released on 28 April 2017 through Illusive Sounds. It debuted at number one on the ARIA Albums Chart.

At the AIR Awards of 2018, the album was nominated for Best Independent Hip Hop/Urban Album.

== Track listing ==
No.	Title	Length
1.	"Off the Grid"	5:05
2.	"Believe" (featuring Mario)	3:43
3.	"Tear the Roof Off" (featuring Watsky)	3:25
4.	"Coolin'" (featuring Dizzy Wright and Rob Curly)	5:27
5.	"Dopamine" (featuring Thief)	3:31
6.	"Devil on My Shoulder"	4:40
7.	"Birds in the Sky"	3:40
8.	"Friend Like You" (featuring Lee Fields)	3:55
9.	"Blue"	4:01
10.	"Great Escape"	4:00
11.	"Whatever Happened to the DJ"	3:40
12.	"Moments" (featuring Gavin James)	3:56
13.	"1-800 Love Line" (skit)	1:25
14.	"Soul Glo" (featuring Lee Fields and Tabi Gazele)	3:53
15.	"Travelling Band"	4:16

== Charts ==
=== Weekly charts ===
Chart (2017)	Peak position
Australian Albums (ARIA)	1
Swiss Albums (Schweizer Hitparade)	99

=== Year-end charts ===
Chart (2017)	Position
Australian Albums (ARIA)	29
Australian Artist Albums (ARIA)	6
Chart (2018)	Position
Australian Artist Albums (ARIA)	44

== Certifications ==
Region	Certification	Certified units/sales
Australia (ARIA)	Platinum	70,000^{‡}
^{‡} Sales+streaming figures based on certification alone.

== Release history ==
Region	Date	Format	Edition(s)	Label	Catalogue
Australia	28 April 2017	CD; digital download	Standard edition	Illusive Sounds	ILLC154/ILLV155
