= Moments (Bliss n Eso song) =

Single by Bliss n Eso featuring Gavin James

from the album Off the Grid
- Released: 28 March 2017
- Length: 3:56
- Label: Illusive Sounds
- Songwriters: Max Mackinnon; Jonathan Notley; Kaelyn Behr; Charlie Handsome; Peter Harding; Nicholas Martin
- Producers: Styalz Fuego; Charlie Handsome; Nicholas Martin; Phillip Threlfall

Bliss n Eso singles chronology
"Friend Like You" (2013)	"Moments" (2017)	"Blue" (2014)

"Moments" is a song by Australian hip-hop group Bliss n Eso featuring Irish singer Gavin James. The song was premiered and released on 28 March 2017 as the third single from the group's sixth studio album Off the Grid.

MC Bliss said "'Moments' is a track that reflects on those precious moments we all had growing up before life got complicated. Your first kiss, the house you lived in, the smells of your childhood neighbourhood, your first time in love. It's about reminiscing and appreciating how those moments have shaped who we are today. Gavi's voice really brought everything together on 'Moments'. His heart-warming vocals helped to paint all our memories even more vividly."

At the 2017 ARIA Music Awards, the song was nominated for Song of the Year, and the Allan Hardy and Tom MacDonald-directed video won Best Video.

At the APRA Music Awards of 2018, the song was nominated for Urban Work of the Year.

== Charts ==
=== Weekly charts ===
Chart (2017)	Peak position
Australia (ARIA)	25

=== Year-end charts ===
Year-end chart performance
Chart (2017)	Position
Australia (ARIA)	81

== Certifications ==
Region	Certification	Certified units/sales
Australia (ARIA)	5× Platinum	350,000^{‡}
New Zealand (RMNZ)	Platinum	30,000^{‡}
^{‡} Sales+streaming figures based on certification alone.
