= Bliss n Eso =

Australian hip-hop trio

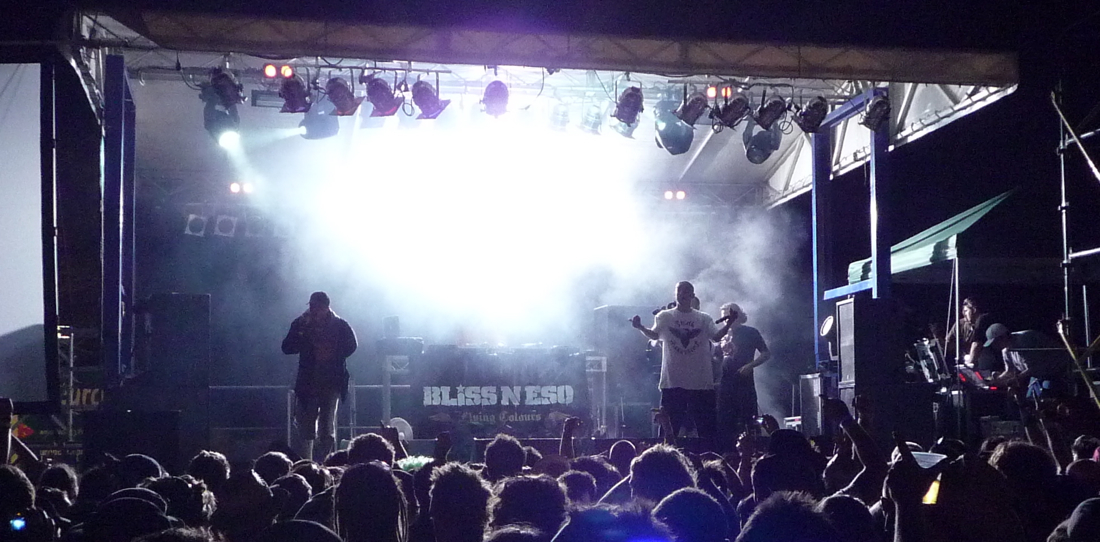
- Bliss n Eso performing at Freshfest in 2009

Background information
- Also known as: Bliss n' Esoterikizm
- Origin: Sydney, New South Wales, Australia
- Genre: Australian hip-hop
- Years active: 2000–present
- Labels: Obese; Illusive; Mushroom Music
- Members: MC Bliss; Esoterik; DJ Izm
- Website: www.blissneso.com

Bliss n Eso (formerly known as Bliss n' Esoterikizm) are an Australian hip-hop trio based in Sydney. The group consists of emcees Bliss and Eso, and DJ Izm, and they are currently signed to Melbourne record label Mushroom Music. Bliss n Eso have released seven studio albums which include three number 1 debuts on the ARIA Charts. They have also won two ARIA Awards for Best Urban Release for their 2008 album Flying Colours and for Best Music Video for their 2017 single "Moments". Eso, under his alias Esoterik, released an album entitled My Astral Plane in May 2018.

== History ==
=== 2000: Formation and The Arrival ===
Bliss n Eso are a trio consisting of American Jonathan Notley (MC Bliss), Australian Max MacKinnon (MC Eso) and Moroccan/Berber Tarik Ejjamai (DJ Izm). Notley moved to Australia in 1992 when he was thirteen and met MacKinnon while attending school in Sydney.

"When I got to Australia, I met Eso (MacKinnon) and he was the only guy at my school into hip-hop. It was so scarce you'd be lucky to find a hip-hop record in a store let alone a whole section." – Jonathan "Bliss" Notley

"Back then hip-hop was basically non-existent; there was no urban or hip-hop section in the CD stores. You'd be lucky to find a couple of albums like a Public Enemy album or something if you went to the CD stores. So I guess that's one of the reasons why Max, who's Eso, and I kinda bonded at high school, I think, because he was really the only other guy in the school who was into hip-hop." – Jonathan "Bliss" Notley

MacKinnon later moved to Mosman High School, where he met Ejjamai. The group initially went by the name of Bliss n Esoterikizm, but that proved to be too much of a mouthful for most people, and thus was shortened.

In 2000, they issued their first release, the EP The Arrival, under the name Bliss n Esoterikizm, which was followed by a mixtape CD.

Bliss n Eso released their debut album, Flowers in the Pavement, on Obese Records in 2004. Bliss n Eso were the winners in the Hip Hop category at the 2003 Music Oz Awards and nominees for Artist of the Year in 2004.

=== 2005–2008: Flowers in the Pavement, Day of the Dog, and Flying Colours ===
In December 2005, the trio performed as a support act for 50 Cent on his Get Rich or Die Tryin' tour together with G-Unit and Lil Jon.

The group then switched labels to Illusive Sounds and released their second official album, Day of the Dog, on 4 March 2006. The album features production from Bliss, Weapon X, Suffa, and MC Motley, among others. It also features guest spots from British emcees MC Motley and Mystro, as well as fellow Sydney MC, Hyjak. Day of the Dog debuted at No. 45 on the ARIA Albums Chart, making it the first Australian hip-hop release to debut in the top 50. The group undertook a national tour in March and April of that year to support the album. Day of the Dog was then entirely remixed by Gold Coast producer M-Phazes and released later that year as Day of the Dog: Phazed Out. The album was nominated for Best Urban Release at the 2007 ARIA Awards; the award was won by the Hilltop Hoods for The Hard Road: Restrung.

The group's third single, "Then Till Now", produced by Weapon X, contains elements from the same Renee Geyer song used by Hilltop Hoods on their track "Riding Under One Banner". It received airplay on Triple J, rage and Video Hits. "Mad Tight", their fourth single, was played on radio stations Triple J, 3RRR, PBS, and FBi. The music video was shown on rage.

In 2007, Bliss n Eso played shows in the northwest of North America, including a performance at the Whistler 2007 Telus World Ski and Snowboard Festival.

"We did a small run of the northwest states, around Portland area and then went up to Whistler in Canada and we did a sold out show in Whistler, which was unreal, to go all the way across the world and have a whole bunch of Aussies screaming at you" – Jonathan Notley

In October 2007, they released the first single of their album, "Bullet and a Target", featuring the Connections Zulu Choir (a 21 piece choir from South Africa). The song was recorded at Jimmy Barnes' home studio in Sydney and reached No. 43 on the ARIA Singles Chart. The track features a remixed version of Citizen Cope's song by the same title. 100% of all profits from the sales of the song goes to The Oaktree Foundation, Australia's only youth-run international aid and development organisation.

Following up on their collaboration with the choir, Bliss n Eso embarked on a journey in June 2007 with MTV and the Oaktree Foundation to some of the poorest regions in South Africa to complete the track and shoot the video clip for "Bullet and a Target". Bliss n Eso also shot a documentary with Evermore, produced by MTV, aimed at creating awareness about the challenges faced by developing communities in Africa. The film clip and 30-minute documentary aired exclusively on MTV and received attention from the media and the public. The group was nominated for the 'Good Karma Award' for these efforts at the 2008 MTV Video Music Awards.

Bliss n Eso were one of the Australian hip-hop artists featured in the documentary Words from the City, which aired on ABC Television in late 2007.

The group's third album, Flying Colours, was released on 26 April 2008, coinciding with a national tour by the group, along with True Live, Funkoars and The Winnie Coopers. The album debuted a week later at No. 10 on the Australian ARIA Albums Chart, and it remained in the ARIA Top 100 for the following 12 weeks. The album was nominated for a J Award in August 2008, and was also nominated for an ARIA award for Best Urban Release.

In August 2008, Bliss n Eso performed at the Splendour in the Grass festival and at the Trackside Festival in Canberra. In September they went on the road for their most successful national tour to date, with sell out performances across the country, concluding with a sold-out homecoming show at the Enmore Theatre in Sydney to a capacity crowd of 2500 patrons. They were scheduled to tour Canada at the end of the year and planned to re-release Flying Colours in early 2009, with a bonus DVD. The DVD was to contain a live performance from at The Metro Theatre in Sydney.

Bliss n Eso appeared for the first time in a Triple J Hottest 100 with three entries in the 2008 countdown; "Eye of the Storm" at number 40, "The Sea is Rising" at number 61 and "Woodstock 2008" at number 94. "Happy in My Hoody" failed to make the Hottest 100 but did come in at number 136.

In 2009, the success of Bliss n Eso continued with their Flying Colours album, which remained in the official ARIA charts for over a year. They also performed at the Sound Relief concert in front of 82,000 people at Melbourne's MCG on 14 March 2009. They were the only hip-hop act to perform at the concert, which raised over 8 million dollars for Victoria's bushfire victims.

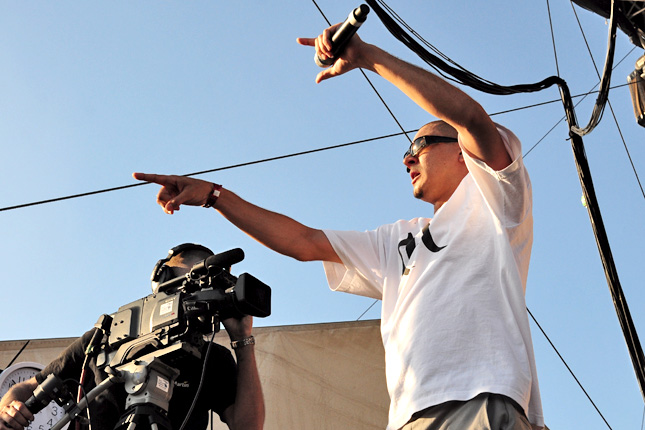
Bliss n Eso in 2009

In April 2009, Bliss n Eso announced a major city Australian tour which included two shows at Melbourne's iconic Festival Hall as well as the largest venues they had played to date across the country. Their first show at Festival Hall sold out in four days, making it the fastest selling Australian hip-hop show of all time, selling to a capacity of 5,100 patrons.

On 26 April 2009, Bliss n Eso became the first Australian hip-hop act to perform on Rove, where they performed "Woodstock 2008" and "The Sea is Rising" to a live television audience broadcast nationally on the Ten Network.

In May 2009, Bliss n Eso received two APRA award nominations in the category, 'Best Urban Works' for "The Sea is Rising" and "Woodstock 2008". On 14 June "Flying Colours" became only the second Australian hip-hop album to be certified gold, after being in the ARIA Charts for 58 weeks. The group's song "Field of Dreams" was included on EA Sports boxing video game Fight Night Round 4.

"Basically, EA Australia can submit one track that's Australian for an international game. There hadn't been an Australian track on a release for a while actually and the 'Fight Night' opportunity came about and EA Australia really liked "Field of Dreams" and thought it worked well with the theme of the game, so they put it forward to the International EA and it got accepted! The fact that it's out there and a million people are going to be playing this thing – it's obviously a big game and the fact that our song's on there, we're stoked. It's pretty awesome, man!" – Jonathan Notley

Bliss n Eso released their live album Flying Colours Live in June 2009 to coincide with another national tour of Australia. The album features a bonus track, "On Tour", which received significant airplay from Triple J. The album also includes a DVD, featuring their MTV nominated documentary, Out of Africa, and the group's live performance at Sydney's Metro Theatre. Following their national tour they planned to work on their fourth studio album, with producers M-Phazes and Hattori Hanzo.

=== 2010–2016: Running on Air and Circus in the Sky ===
On 17 May 2010, Bliss n Eso released "Down by the River", the first single off their fourth studio album. On 30 July 2010, Bliss n Eso released their fourth studio album, Running on Air, which debuted at number one on the Australian ARIA charts. Shortly afterwards, Bliss n Eso embarked their sold-out Down By the River Australian tour. The album was nominated for multiple awards, including the Triple J Album of the Year, Channel V Australian Artist of the Year award, Independent Music Award, APRA Awards and two ARIA awards.

In March 2012, the band embarked on their first ever headline tour of the US and Canada. Playing 22 shows across the West Coast of both countries in under a month, the band cemented themselves a position in the international hip-hop scene. In late 2012, Bliss n Eso commenced work on their fifth studio album. The album was recorded between Australia and Los Angeles. The album, Circus in the Sky debuted at Number 1 on the ARIA Album Chart and was certified platinum. Throughout April and May 2014, the trio embarked on their biggest national tour to date.

=== 2016–2019: Off the Grid ===
In late 2016, Bliss n Eso announced that their new album, Off the Grid would be released on 10 March 2017. The album contained the two singles released in 2016, "Dopamine" and "Friend Like You". On 28 March, the single "Moments" was released, along with their tour announcement.

==== Death of Johann Ofner during production ====
On 23 January 2017, Johann Ofner, a professional stunt double was shot in the chest and killed during The Dreamers production of the music video for "Friend Like You" at the Brooklyn Standard, a bar in Eagle Lane, Brisbane, Australia. After the incident, the group announced that "Off The Grid"'s release date would be moved to 28 April.

Statement from the band "We continue to express our support and condolences to the family and friends of those so deeply affected by this sad event and appreciate your ongoing understanding in this incredibly difficult time."

The coronial inquest determined that the stunt double was killed by the wad of a blank shotgun round that was not intended to be fired directly at anyone.

=== 2020–present: The Sun ===
On 16 June 2021, Bliss N Eso announced the release of their seventh studio album, The Sun. The album was proceeded by the singles "Lighthouse", "So Happy"/"Send It", "Good People" and "OG's".

=== 2025: The Moon ===
Bliss n Eso embarked on their Party on the Moon Tour 2025 across Australia from May to August in support of their album The Moon (The Light Side). They were joined by Melbourne rapper Ivan Ooze. In May 2025, the group announced the follow up The Moon (The Dark Side) will be released on 3 October 2025. It was brought forward a week and released on 26 September 2025.

== Discography ==
- Flowers in the Pavement (2004)
- Day of the Dog (2006)
- Flying Colours (2008)
- Running on Air (2010)
- Circus in the Sky (2013)
- Off the Grid (2017)
- The Sun (2021)
- The Moon (The Light Side) (2025)
- The Moon (The Dark Side) (2025)

== Awards and nominations ==
=== AIR Awards ===
The Australian Independent Record Awards (known colloquially as the AIR Awards) is an annual awards night to recognise, promote and celebrate the success of Australia's Independent Music sector.

Year	Nominee / work	Award	Result	Ref.
2010	"Down By the River"	Best Independent Single / EP	Nominated	
2013	Circus in the Sky	Best Independent Hip Hop / Urban Album	Nominated	
2018	Off the Grid	Best Independent Hip Hop/Urban Album	Nominated	
2026	The Moon (The Light Side)	Best Independent Hip Hop Album or EP	Nominated	
2026	Mushroom Music for The Moon (The Light Side)	Independent Marketing Team of the Year	Nominated	
2026	Mushroom Music for The Moon (The Light Side)	Independent Publicity Team of the Year	Nominated	

=== APRA Awards ===
The APRA Awards are presented annually from 1982 by the Australasian Performing Right Association (APRA), "honouring composers and songwriters".

Year	Nominee / work	Award	Result	Ref.
2009	"Woodstock 2008"	Best Urban Work	Nominated	
2009	"Sea is Rising"	Best Urban Work	Nominated	
2010	"On Tour"	Best Urban Work	Nominated	
2011	"Addicted"	Best Urban Work	Nominated	
2011	"Down By the River"	Best Urban Work	Nominated	
2012	"Reflections"	Best Urban Work	Nominated	
2012	"Act Your Age" – Bliss n Eso featuring Bluejuice	Song of the Year	Shortlisted	
2014	"Act Yr Age" (featuring Bluejuice)	Best Urban Work	Won	
2014	"House of Dreams"	Best Urban Work	Nominated	
2015	"My Life"	Best Urban Work	Nominated	
2018	"Moments"	Best Urban Work	Nominated	
2019	"Believe"	Best Urban Work	Nominated	
2026	"Party On the Moon"	Most Performed Australian Work	Nominated	

=== ARIA Music Awards ===
The ARIA Music Awards is an annual awards ceremony that recognises excellence, innovation, and achievement across all genres of Australian music.

Year	Nominee / work	Award	Result	Ref.
2006	"Up Jumped The Boogie"	Best Urban Release	Nominated	
2007	Day of the Dog: Phazed Out	Best Urban Release	Nominated	
2008	Flying Colours	Best Urban Release	Won	
2010	Running on Air	Best Urban Album	Nominated	
2010	Flying Colours Live	Best Music DVD	Nominated	
2013	Circus in the Sky	Best Urban Album	Nominated	
2013	Circus in the Sky	Best Cover Art	Nominated	
2017	"Moments" (featuring Gavin James)	Song of the Year	Nominated	
2017	"Moments" (directed by Allan Hardy and Tom MacDonald)	Best Video	Won	
2025	Bliss n Eso – Menulog: What's Good in Your Hood (Thinkerbell)	Best Use of an Australian Recording in an Advertisement	Nominated	

=== EG Awards / Music Victoria Awards ===
The EG Awards (known as Music Victoria Awards since 2013) are an annual awards night celebrating Victorian music. They commenced in 2006.

Year	Nominee / work	Award	Result	Ref.
2010	Themselves	Best Band	Won	

=== J Award ===
The J Awards are an annual series of Australian music awards that were established by the Australian Broadcasting Corporation's youth-focused radio station Triple J. They commenced in 2005.

Year	Nominee / work	Award	Result	Ref.
2008	Flying Colours	Australian Album of the Year	Nominated	
2010	Running on Air	Australian Album of the Year	Nominated	

=== MTV Australia Awards ===
Year	Nominee / work	Award	Result	Ref.
2008	Themselves	Good Karma Award	Won	
2009	Themselves	Best Independent Artist	Won	

=== Musicoz Awards ===
Year	Nominee / work	Award	Result	Ref.
2003	Themselves	Best Urban Artist	Won	
2004	Themselves	Best Urban Artist	Won	
