= MTV Australia Awards 2008 =

Annual Australian music awards ceremony

2008 MTV Australia Awards
- Date: 26 April 2008
- Location: Australian Technology Park, Sydney
- Hosted by: Wyclef Jean

Television/radio coverage
- Network: MTV Australia

The MTV Australia Awards 2008 is the new title for the Australian MTV Awards previously known as the MTV Australia Video Music Awards. The show was held at Australian Technology Park in Redfern, Sydney on 26 April 2008 and aired live on MTV Australia and Fox8 on the Foxtel, Austar and Optus platforms in Australia and 28 April on Sky Digital in New Zealand.

== History ==
Voting commenced on 12 March 2008 and concluded on 25 April 2008. Unlike previous shows, it included, for the first time, Best Australian and Best New Zealand artist award as well as Music Video of the year, Television Moment, Live Performer, Good and Bad Karma awards, the Re-Make award which allowed viewer's to re-film a moment in television in their own style. MTV New Zealand hosted the second Mile High Gig which flew Kiwi fans via Air New Zealand to the award's show with special guests performing on board including Dizzee Rascal and Scribe. The show was hosted by Wyclef Jean. Part of the years line-up were Academy Award nominee Juliette Lewis and her band Juliette & The Licks, Grammy Award winner Eve and 50 Cent. MTV Australia, were seeking Lindsay Lohan to be a guest of honour at the awards show but she later had to cancel her appearance due to film commitments. The show also had special awards which included the "Movie Star Award" which was awarded to actor Matt Damon, originally meant to be presented by Mischa Barton but was instead presented by 50 Cent and G Unit; "International Music Artist of the Year", awarded to Timbaland and presented by The Veronicas and the "Sport Award" for surfer Mick Fanning presented by Ian Thorpe. The show was aired across 19 countries.

== Performers ==
- The Veronicas
- Dizzee Rascal
- The Potbelleez
- Eve
- Juliette & The Licks
- Kisschasy
- Wyclef Jean
- The Vines

== Presenters ==
- Andrew Hansen
- Brian McFadden
- Eve
- James Ash
- Julian Morrow
- Juliette Lewis
- Leona Lewis
- Mischa Barton
- Natalie Bassingthwaighte
- Merrick and Rosso (Red Carpet Hosts)
- The Veronicas

== Winners and nominees ==
| Video of the Year | MTV Live Performer |
|---|---|
| Delta Goodrem — "Believe Again"; Fergie — "Clumsy"; Mika — "Happy Ending"; Foo Fighters — "The Pretender"; 50 Cent feat. Justin Timberlake & Timbaland — "Ayo Technology" | Pink — I'm Not Dead Tour; Foo Fighters — Echoes, Silence, Patience & Grace Tour; Justin Timberlake — FutureSex/LoveShow Tour; Lupe Fiasco — Snow Jam; Juliette & The Licks — The Lair |
| Best Aussie | Best Kiwi |
| The Veronicas; Sneaky Sound System; Silverchair; Delta Goodrem; Operator Please | Scribe; Opshop; The Mint Chicks; Atlas; The Checks |
| Good Karma Award | Bad Karma Award |
| Earth Hour Engaging Australia and the world to act against climate change.; Bliss n Eso South African fundraising efforts, including 'Bullet and a Target' charity single.; Sea Shepherd Crew of the Steve Irwin trying to keep whales on the planet a little longer.; Young People of Australia for believing saying sorry was something worth voting for.; Movember Raising awareness and funding for male health issues. | Kevin Andrews for refusing Snoop Dogg entry into Australia; Kevin Andrews for saying "He doesn't seem the sort of bloke we want in this country"; Kevin Andrews for defining 'bad hair day'; Kevin Andrews for all of the above, especially the hair, and the Snoop Dogg thing |
| Television Moment Award | Remake Award |
| The Chaser's War on Everything — APEC 2007 Stunt; Corey Worthington – The A Current Affair Interview; Jake Brown — X Games 45ft stack & stand; A Shot at Love with Tila Tequila — Brandi and Vanessa's fight; Snoop Dogg — MTV Citizenship campaign | Summer Heights High — Ja'mie's teary tirade; Chris Crocker — Leave Britney Alone' freakout; Heath Franklin — Chopper's Weather Report; Roads & Traffic Authority — Speeding. No One Thinks Big of You. Campaign |

== Special awards ==
=== Movie Star Award ===
- Matt Damon

=== Sport's Award ===
- Mick Fanning

=== International Music Artist of the Year ===
- Timbaland
