= Whatever (Jennifer Batten album) =

Studio album by Jennifer Batten
- Released: September 10, 2007
- Genre: Instrumental rock, electronica
- Length: 48:59
- Label: Wood Bell
- Producer: Jennifer Batten

Jennifer Batten chronology
Jennifer Batten's Tribal Rage: Momentum (1997)	Whatever (2007)

Professional ratings
Review scores
Source	Rating
AllMusic	3.5/5 stars

Whatever is the third studio album by guitarist Jennifer Batten, released on September 10, 2007 through Wood Bell Records (Japan) and on April 18, 2008 through Lion Music (Europe). Included with the album is a DVD containing a selection of instructional footage and music videos by Batten, as well as music videos by guest videographers/editors.

== Track listing ==
All tracks are written by Jennifer Batten, except where noted.

No.	Title	Length
1.	"Ass Whoopin'"	4:54
2.	"Ricochet"	3:53
3.	"Off the Deep End"	5:19
4.	"Whatever"	3:53
5.	"Fearless"	4:51
6.	"Hooligan's Holiday"	5:02
7.	"In the Aftermath"	5:59
8.	"Run With It"	5:34
9.	"Cupid's Arrow"	5:31
10.	"Inner Journey" (Batten, Michael Jordan)	4:03
Total length:		48:59

== Personnel ==
- Jennifer Batten – guitar, guitar synthesizer, programming, spoken vocals (tracks 2, 4), sound effects (track 10), production
- Ann Marie Crouch – vocals (track 4), spoken vocals (track 4)
- Leah Santos – vocals (track 6)
- Herman Begay – vocals (track 8)
- Michael Jordan – drums (track 10), percussion (track 5), sound effects (track 10)
- Sandin Wilson – bass (track 2)
- Andre Berry – bass (track 3)
- Skip Vonkuske – cello
- Nelly Kovalev – violin
- Betsy Hamilton – Native American flute
- Jon Clark – spoken vocals (track 1)
- Debbie Schepps – spoken vocals (track 3)
- Sean Dailey – spoken vocals (track 4)
- Bret Helm – spoken vocals (tracks 4, 9)
- Kari Helm – spoken vocals (track 4)
- Nel Gerome – spoken vocals (track 4)
- Nick Moon – mixing
- Chris Bellman – mastering
