= The Moon (The Light Side) =

Studio album by Bliss n Eso
- Released: 11 April 2025
- Label: Flight Deck, Mushroom Records
- Producer: Max MacKinnon, Jonathan Notley

Bliss n Eso chronology
The Sun (2021)	The Moon (The Light Side) (2025)	The Moon (The Dark Side) (2025)

Singles from The Moon (The Light Side)
- 1. "Feeling Fly" Released: 8 November 2024; 2. "Vacation" Released: 29 November 2024; 3. "Party on the Moon" Released: 31 January 2025; 4. "Take Me Higher" Released: 14 March 2025; 5. "Been Through Hell" Released: 11 April 2025

The Moon (The Light Side) is the eighth studio album by the Australian hip-hop trio Bliss n Eso. It was released on 11 April 2025 and it debuted at number one on the ARIA Albums Chart, becoming the group's fourth number 1 album in Australia.

In March 2025, the trio said "Making our new album The Moon (The Light Side) was honestly one of the most fun times we've had in the studio in years. We wanted to return to the essence of what made us fall in love with Hip Hop when we were kids – that classic golden era party rocking vibe that originally made BnE. We've been blessed to have built up an incredible fan base over the years and when making this album we constantly envisioned playing these new songs and the electric energy they would create between us and the crowd."

At the AIR Awards of 2026, it was nominated for Best Independent Hip Hop Album or EP while Mushroom Music were nominated for Independent Marketing Team and Independent Publicity Team of the Year for their work on this release.

== Track listing ==
1. "The New Frontier" - 1:54
2. "Take Me Higher" - 3:33
3. "Party On the Moon" - 3:48
4. "Vacation 3:00
5. "Feeling Fly" - 2:26
6. "Money Money" - 3:48
7. "Been Through Hell" (featuring 360, Benny Morrell and Masked Wolf) - 3:48
8. "The Ultimate" - 3:49
9. "Struck Like Lighting" (featuring Futuristic) - 5:03
10. "Hoops" - 3:44
11. "3AM" (featuring Benny Morrell) - 3:50

== Charts ==
=== Weekly charts ===
Chart (2025)	Peak position
Australian Albums (ARIA)	1

=== Year-end charts ===
Chart (2025)	Position
Australian Artist Albums (ARIA)	14

== See also ==
- List of number-one albums of 2025 (Australia)
