= The Book of Love (The Magnetic Fields song) =

1999 song

Song by the Magnetic Fields

from the album 69 Love Songs
- Released: September 7, 1999
- Recorded: April 1999
- Studio: Polar West, Mother West, Polar Mother, and Sonics
- Genre: Indie rock, indie pop, lo-fi, baroque pop
- Length: 2:42
- Label: Merge
- Songwriter: Stephin Merritt

"The Book of Love" is a song written by Stephin Merritt and originally performed and recorded by the Magnetic Fields, an American indie pop group founded and led by him. "The Book of Love" appears on Magnetic Fields' three-volume concept album 69 Love Songs, which contains 69 tracks described as "love songs", 23 tracks in each of the three volumes. The three-volume album was released in 1999, with "The Book of Love" appearing in volume 1 as track number 12.

== Versions ==
The song has been covered and re-recorded by a variety of musicians:

=== Peter Gabriel version ===
"The Book of Love / Not One of Us"

Single by Peter Gabriel / Stephin Merritt

from the album Scratch My Back / And I'll Scratch Yours
- Released: January 30, 2010
- Recorded: 2009
- Length: 3:53 ("The Book of Love"); 3:58 ("Not One of Us")
- Songwriters: Stephin Merritt "The Book of Love"; Peter Gabriel ("Not One of Us")

When the Magnetic Fields appeared at London's Lyric Hammersmith Theatre in January 2001 to play their album 69 Love Songs in its entirety, they were joined by Peter Gabriel for an encore of "The Book of Love". He later recorded his own cover of the song for the soundtrack of the 2004 romantic comedy film Shall We Dance? His cover has since been featured in film and television, such as in the Scrubs episode "My Finale" and the South Park episode "Tweek x Craig".

Gabriel's version appeared on his 2010 album Scratch My Back. Gabriel originally intended to release Scratch My Back and And I'll Scratch Yours simultaneously. However, as completion of the latter dragged out, it was instead decided to release a series of double A-sided singles with one song from each album every full moon during 2010 on iTunes. The first of such singles was Gabriel's cover of "The Book of Love", together with Magnetic Fields frontman Stephin Merritt's cover of Gabriel's song "Not One of Us". It was released on 30 January 2010, on the day of January 2010's full moon.

On April 17, 2010, "The Book of Love" / "Not One of Us" as well as the follow-ups "Flume" / "Come Talk to Me" were released on 7" vinyl to independent record stores.

Track listing

1. Side A: "The Book of Love" (Peter Gabriel) – 3:53
2. Side B: "Not One of Us" (Peter Gabriel featuring Stephin Merritt) – 3:58

Chart performance

Chart (2010)	Peak position
Austria (Ö3 Austria Top 40)	70
Belgium (Ultratop 50 Wallonia)	29
Germany (GfK)	93

=== Gavin James version ===
The Book of Love EP

EP by Gavin James
- Released: March 23, 2015
- Recorded: 2014–2015
- Length: 14:21
- Labels: Good Soldier / Believe; Sony (distribution)

"The Book of Love"

Single by Gavin James

from the album Bitter Pill
- Released: January 2, 2015
- Recorded: 2014
- Length: 3:15
- Label: Good Soldier / Believe
- Songwriter: Stephin Merritt

Music video
- "The Book of Love" on YouTube

In 2015, Irish singer-songwriter Gavin James recorded his version appearing on his EP single The Book of Love. The Book of Love EP contains four versions, the official radio track, and three remixes by Raffertie, by JOY (Rework) and Young Wonder.

The track appeared also in a four-track EP by James called For Love and eventually was included on his album Bitter Pill.

The single charted in Belgium reaching number 10 on the Ultratop official chart. It also charted in the Netherlands both on Dutch Top 40 and Dutch Single Top 100.

Track listing

1. "The Book of Love" – 3:15
2. "The Book of Love" (Raffertie remix) – 3:40
3. "The Book of Love" (JOY. rework) – 3:43
4. "The Book of Love" (Young Wonder remix) – 3:43
5. "The Book of Love" (Does It Offend You, Yeah? Remix) – 3:49

Charts

Weekly chart performance for "The Book of Love" by Gavin James
Chart (2014–2015)	Peak position
Belgium (Ultratop 50 Flanders)	10
Belgium (Ultratip Bubbling Under Wallonia)	22
Netherlands (Dutch Top 40)	35
Netherlands (Single Top 100)	31

Year-end charts

Year-end chart performance for "The Book of Love" by Gavin James
Chart (2015)	Position
Belgium (Ultratop Flanders)	58
Netherlands (Single Top 100)	88

Certifications

Region	Certification	Certified units/sales
Netherlands (NVPI)	Platinum	30,000^{‡}
^{‡} Sales+streaming figures based on certification alone.

=== "Il Libro Dell' Amore (The Book of Love)" by 2CELLOS feat. Zucchero ===
The song was translated into Italian as "Il Libro Dell' Amore" and rerecorded by Italian singer Zucchero and the Croatian duo musicians 2Cellos on the album In2ition.

=== Cheryl Bentyne version ===
Cheryl Bentyne covered "The Book of Love" on her 2006 album The Book of Love, accompanied by gospel singer Mark Kibble.

=== Chaps Choir version ===
On April 30, 2016, the Islington, London-based all-male Chaps Choir released its live version of "The Book of Love" as Side B of a double A-sided 7" vinyl single with Side A being "Anyone Who Knows What Love Is (Will Understand)" by Samantha Whates featuring Chaps Choir. Directed by musician Dominic Stichbury, the Chaps Choir version was recorded at the Union Chapel in Islington and released independently on 2016 Good Chap Records and available as a 7" vinyl and digitally.

=== The Shadowboxers version ===
The Shadowboxers recorded a version for The Book of Love, a 2016 independent film which took its name from the song. This version features uncredited vocals by Justin Timberlake. The film's soundtrack entitled The Book of Love (Original Motion Picture Soundtrack) was composed by Timberlake and Mitchell Owens and was released on January 13, 2017.

=== Atle Pettersen version ===
On November 12, 2019, Norwegian pop artist Atle Pettersen released "Juletid" ("Christmas Time") on digital platforms with new Christmas-themed lyrics in Norwegian.

=== Mike Doughty version ===
Mike Doughty released Golden Delicious on February 19, 2008, which included "Book of Love" as an "[iTunes Only (Magnetic Fields Cover)]", track 12, with only acoustic guitar, piano and vocals, very true to the original.

=== Tracey Thorn version ===
Tracey Thorn released the album Out Of The Woods, which included "Book of Love" as track 13.

=== Mishima version ===
The Catalan band Mishima included a version in Catalan, "El llibre de l'amor", in its 2022 album L'aigua clara (Crystal Clear Water).

=== The Airborne Toxic Event version ===
It was covered by the American indie band The Airborne Toxic Event in the live album All I Ever Wanted: Live from Walt Disney Concert Hall featuring Calder Quartet. Lead singer Mikel Jollett dedicated the song to his grandmother, who had passed away one week prior to the concert. The live recording was released on Island Def Jam Records.

=== Olivia Rodrigo version ===
American singer-songwriter Olivia Rodrigo released a charity cover of "The Book of Love" on March 6, 2026, through a collaboration with the children's charity War Child. It is the final track on the organization's compilation album HELP(2); all proceeds from the album benefitted their work in helping children living through emergencies and conflicts. The cover's accompanying music video, made under the creative direction of Jonathan Glazer, was filmed by children in Gaza, Sudan, Ukraine, and Yemen.

== In popular culture ==
- The Peter Gabriel version has been used in films and on television, including in the 2004 movie Shall We Dance?; on Scrubs during the series finale in 2009, "My Finale"; and on the animated series South Park in the episode "Tweek x Craig".
- In 2014, contestant Sequoia LaDeil sang the song during the knockout phase in season 4 of The Voice of Germany.
- In July 2015, Zoë sang it on the finale of the German program The Voice Kids, a singing contest for children of 8 to 14 years old.
- In September 2015, Dutch contestant Jasper van Aarst sang it during the Blind Auditions of season 6 of The Voice of Holland.
- James Patrick Stuart performed the song during the Nurse's Ball on the American soap opera General Hospital.
- The Magnetic Fields version is heard in the 2014 movie Extraterrestrial and was also used in the Fox series Lethal Weapon (season 3, episode 5 "Get The Picture") and the Netflix show Friends From College in 2019 (season 2, episode 7).
- Comedian Arthur Smith performs a version of it during Syd, his 2019 show about his late father.
- In 2021, it was covered by Taylor Hickson's character, Raelle Collar, in the television series Motherland: Fort Salem (Season 2, Episode 6 "My 3 Dads").
- It also is the source of the title of the 2004 film in which the song is prominent, Book of Love starring Simon Baker, Frances O'Connor and Gregory Smith.
- Author Nicola Yoon's young adult romance Instructions for Dancing derives its title from a line in the song.
- Dave Matthews covered the song at his concert on November 19, 2024.
