= The Moon (The Dark Side) =

Studio album by Bliss n Eso
- Released: 26 September 2025
- Length: 32:07
- Labels: Flight Deck, Mushroom Records

Bliss n Eso chronology
| The Moon (The Light Side) (2025) | The Moon (The Dark Side) (2025) |

Singles from The Moon (The Dark Side)
- 1. "Chemical Heart (Geed Up)" Released: 16 May 2025; 2. "Be OK" Released: 27 June 2025; 3. "My Gang" Released: 8 August 2025; 4. "23 'til Infinity" Released: 19 September 2025

The Moon (The Dark Side) is the ninth studio album by the Australian hip-hop trio Bliss n Eso. It was announced on 16 May 2025, a month after the release of their previous album. The album was released on 26 September 2025 and it debuted at number three on the ARIA Albums Chart, their seventh top 10 album in Australia.

The trio said releasing two albums in the same year was the result of "an extended burst of creativity", "We basically got into the studio and just went crazy — the creativity was flowing so much and we recorded so many songs. We got to the point where we showed the label what we were working on, and they were like, 'This is too dope to just put out one'. So we decided to split it up, and since the last album was The Sun, we went with a moon concept for these ones."

== Track listing ==
1. "Tale of Pale Blue Dot" (Part 1) - 2:08
2. "Home" (featuring Dizzy Wright) - 3:41
3. "Chemical Heart (Geed Up)" (featuring Grinspoon) - 2:54
4. "Reach the Heavens" (featuring Benny Morrell) - 3:46
5. "My Gang" - 3:18
6. "Be OK" - 2:51
7. "23 'til Infinity" - 2:33
8. "Your Mother Loves It" - 2:23
9. "Come My Lady" (featuring Ekoh) - 3:37
10. "Something's Gotta Give" (featuring Benny Morrell) - 2:39
11. "Tale of Pale Blue Dot (Part 2)" - 2:14

== Charts ==
=== Weekly charts ===
| Chart (2025) | Peak position |
|---|---|
| Australian Albums (ARIA) | 3 |

=== Year-end charts ===
| Chart (2025) | Position |
|---|---|
| Australian Artist Albums (ARIA) | 24 |
