= The Sun (Bliss n Eso album) =

Studio album by Bliss n Eso
- Released: 27 August 2021
- Length: 50:51
- Label: Flight Deck, Mushroom Records

Bliss n Eso chronology
Off The Grid (2017)	The Sun (2021)	The Moon (The Light Side) (2025)

Singles from The Sun
- 1. "Lighthouse" Released: 21 August 2020; 2. "So Happy"/"Send It" Released: 13 November 2020; 3. "Good People" Released: 23 April 2021; 4. "OG's" Released: 16 June 2021; 5. "On One" Released: 30 July 2021; 6. "Tell the World I'm Coming" Released: 20 August 2021

The Sun is the seventh studio album by the Australian hip-hop trio Bliss n Eso. The album was announced in June 2017, alongside the single "OG's". It was released on 27 August 2021 and it debuted at number two on the ARIA Albums Chart.

== Track listing ==
1. "The Prophecy" - 3:43
2. "Send It" - 4:29
3. "OG's" (featuring ChillinIT) - 4:40
4. "Cadillac Outta Hell" (featuring Lee Fields) - 3:52
5. "Good People" (featuring Kasey Chambers) - 4:23
6. "On One" (featuring Dizzee Rascal and Kings)- 4:39
7. "Daddy's Caddy" - 4:14
8. "Lost With You" (featuring BOI) - 3:35
9. "Tell the World That I'm Coming" - 4:43
10. "So Happy" (featuring SonReal) - 4:00
11. "Know Yourself" (featuring Fergus James) - 4:09
12. "Lighthouse" (featuring Jake Isaac)- 4:20

== Charts ==
=== Weekly charts ===
Chart (2021)	Peak position
Australian Albums (ARIA)	2

=== Year-end charts ===
Chart (2021)	Position
Australian Artist Albums (ARIA)	18
