= Jennifer Batten's Tribal Rage: Momentum =

Studio album by Jennifer Batten
- Released: August 5, 1997
- Recorded: American Recording; Goodnight L.A.B. in Panorama City, Los Angeles; The Hub
- Genres: Instrumental rock; progressive rock; jazz fusion; worldbeat
- Length: 61:45
- Label: East West

Jennifer Batten chronology
Above Below and Beyond (1992)	Jennifer Batten's Tribal Rage: Momentum (1997)	Whatever (2007)

Jennifer Batten's Tribal Rage: Momentum is the second studio album by guitarist Jennifer Batten, released on August 5, 1997, through East West Records and reissued in June 2008 through Lion Music.

== Critical reception ==
Professional ratings
Review scores
Source	Rating
All About Jazz	Favorable
AllMusic	(No review)

John W. Patterson at All About Jazz gave Jennifer Batten's Tribal Rage: Momentum a glowing review, saying "I've never heard anyone do anything quite like Batten's continuous stream of note-bending, tapping, swells, controlled feedback, harmonics, and lightning-fast riffs." He likened the album to Batten's popular guitarist peers, but also that "She goes beyond [Steve] Vai's insane excursions and tops it off by tipping her hat and then running past [Joe] Satriani's finer weirdness." Praise was also given to her supporting musicians: "There is some seriously cool bass work and severely challenging percussion happening here as well."

== Track listing ==
No.	Title	Length
1.	"Wodaabe Dancer"	8:30
2.	"Elephant Stomp"	7:10
3.	"Zulu Wedding"	9:30
4.	"Scottsman in the Carribean"	8:57
5.	"The Swarm"	9:19
6.	"Glow"	8:45
7.	"Unplug This"	9:34
Total length:		61:45

== Personnel ==
- Jennifer Batten – guitar, guitar synthesizer, keyboard, talk box, background vocals (tracks 1, 4)
- Glen Sobel – drums, percussion
- Ricky Wolking – bass, banjo, talk box, background vocals (tracks 1, 4)
- Chris Tervitt – spoken vocals (track 4)
- Sean Wiggins – spoken vocals (track 6), background vocals (tracks 1, 4)
- Benny Collins – spoken vocals (track 7)
- Bret Helm – background vocals (tracks 1, 4)
- Janis Massey – background vocals (tracks 1, 4)
- Sylmarian Pygmee choir – background vocals (tracks 1, 4)
- Bill Cooper – engineering
- Shay Baby – engineering
- Jimmy Crichton – engineering
- DeWayne Barron – engineering
- Rick James Jr. – engineering
- Pat Thrasher – engineering
- Erik Zobler – mixing
- Steven Stuart Short – mixing
- David Mitson – mastering
