= Skyfest =

Skyfest was an annual fireworks display, accompanied by background music compiled by Mark McCabe, which took place in Ireland. It was part of the annual St. Patrick's Festival in the country. The fireworks display took place for a number of years in the country's capital, Dublin; however in 2008 it relocated to the Rock of Cashel, County Tipperary. In 2009 it was held in Waterford, and in 2010 it was held in Limerick. It was held on 19 March 2011 in Wexford. The display was televised live on RTÉ One and was sponsored by the National Lottery. It was cancelled in 2012.

== History ==
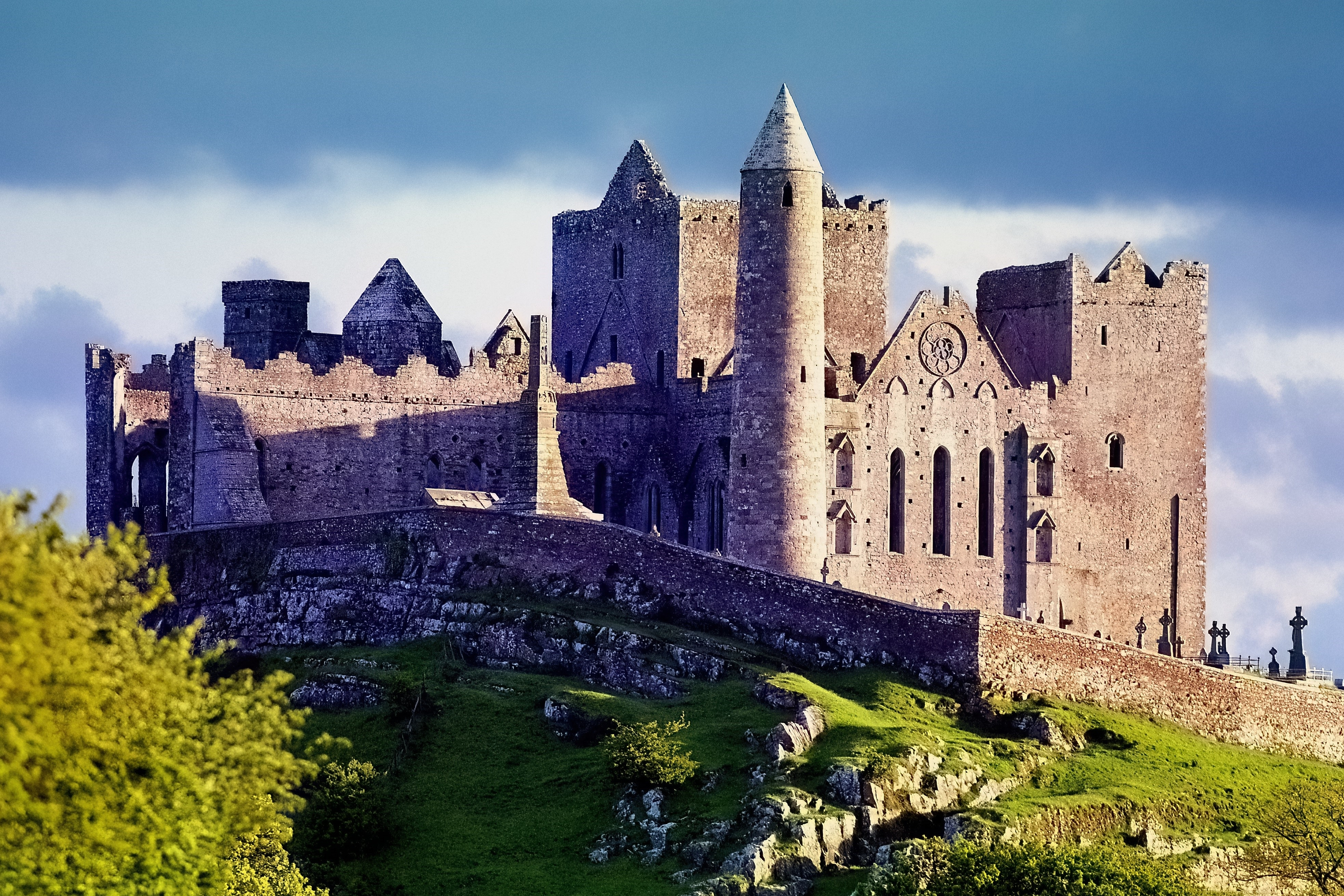
Skyfest was held at the Rock of Cashel, County Tipperary (pictured above) in 2008.

Skyfest took place in Dublin from its inception until 2006. The 2007 event, which would have been the final one in the capital with an expected attendance of 200,000 people, was eventually cancelled due to extreme weather conditions. In 2008, Skyfest relocated to the Rock of Cashel in County Tipperary.

In 2009, the event took place in Waterford for the first time. It commenced at 18:30 on 14 March. The display occurred on the city's quays along the River Suir. The event was expected to attract 50,000 people but, due to the unanticipated arrival of crowds of people on the day of the event, the actual figure was closer to 100,000. Live music was also provided by the Irish folk music/world music band Kíla and local percussion group Torann, alongside that of the DJ Mark McCabe who compiled a set which featured music from U2, Enya and Kings of Leon. The event received its usual televisation on RTÉ One, presented by Derek Mooney and Laura Woods, the latter of whom also presented a special televised national lottery draw from the region.

Skyfest in Waterford attracted more than 100,000 people making it the biggest crowd outside Dublin. Skyfest in Limerick attracted around 50,000 people.

In 2011 it was held in Wexford. It was cancelled in 2012.

== Organisation ==
Planning for the event tended to take almost one year. For the 2009 fireworks display, a crew of twenty-six people from the British based firm Pains Fireworks placed 2.69 tonnes of fireworks alongside the city centre quays of Waterford. 130 volunteers also assisted with the work. The display involved the setting off of approximately 4,000 multi-coloured "shots" over the area, taking in Rice Bridge, the Odlum silos, the spire of the Sacred Heart Church and the tower of Saint Mary's Abbey. Mark McCabe, an employee of Raidió Teilifís Éireann (RTÉ) who televise the event live, has compiled the background music for Skyfest since 2005, although he only witnessed the event live for the first time alongside his fiancée, Joanna Hammond, in 2009.
