= Gavin James (singer) =

Irish singer-songwriter (born 1991)

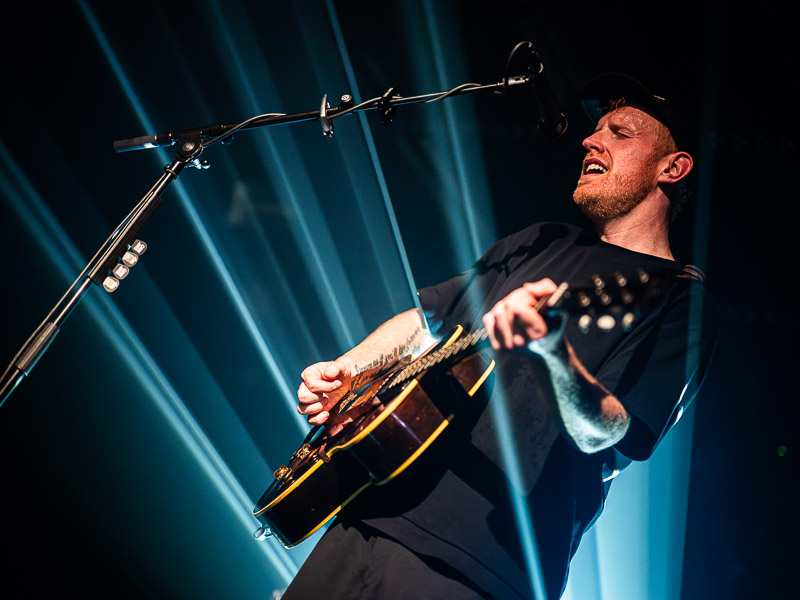
- Gavin James - Burgerweeshuis Deventer - 23 October 2025 - Raymond Rothengatter

Background information
- Born: Gavin Wigglesworth; 5 July 1991 (age 35); Dublin, Ireland
- Genres: Pop, acoustic
- Occupation: Singer-songwriter
- Instruments: Vocals; guitar; piano
- Years active: 2013–present
- Labels: Capitol; Sony; Warner; Good Soldier Songs
- Website: gavinjamesmusic.com

Gavin Wigglesworth (born 5 July 1991), known professionally as Gavin James, is an Irish singer-songwriter. In March 2013 and March 2016, he won two Choice Music Prize Irish Song of the Year award.

== Early life ==
James was born in Dublin and grew up in a musical household. His father would play Cat Stevens, Sam Cooke and Bob Dylan, whilst his sister Emma sang and toured with a musical in Ireland. James' great-grandparents were opera singers and his grandfather was a stand-up comedian and whistler.

James began playing music in a rock band at the age of 8 and writing his own songs. The rock band was short lived, after a falling out over an alleged "paranormal experience". However James continued to perform solo, playing numerous gigs for years and building his audience. By age 21 he had begun focusing on his songwriting and playing open mic nights. In 2013, James independently released the single "Say Hello", which won the Meteor Choice Award for Song of the Year. By 2015, James had signed deals with Sony in Europe and Capitol Records in the US.

== Musical career ==
In the spring of 2015, James appeared on US television's Shark Tank and released a four-track EP titled For You. Later that year, he was invited to open for chart-toppers Ed Sheeran and Sam Smith on their respective tours, and released singles including "Bitter Pill" from his full-length studio debut of the same name.

James released his debut album and homage to Alanis Morissette Bitter Pill on 20 November 2015 through Warner Ireland. It was awarded Platinum certificate for sales in Ireland. Subsequently, Bitter Pill has won the Choice Music Prize for Best Single released in 2015.

In May and November 2015, James appeared on James Corden's Late Late Show and Jimmy Kimmel in December 2015. In January 2016 James appeared on the BBC One Show, C'est A Vous and RTÉ and was included in Buzzfeed's and The Sun's 'Ones to Watch 2016' lists.

He has been supporting act for Kodaline, Tori Kelly, Sam Smith and Ed Sheeran on their tours.

Spotify selected Gavin James to be a 'Spotify Spotlight Artist of 2016,' and he has total streams of over 1.5 Billion. On 21 January 2016, James set off on his debut European headline tour, starting with three sold out back-to-back dates at the Olympia Theatre in Ireland. James travelled back to America to support Ben Rector on his US tour in March 2016. James' cover of David Bowie's "Changes" relaunched the new Virgin Radio UK at 11 am GMT on 30 March 2016, he later performed live and was interviewed for the show.

On 7 October 2016, James sold out Shepherd's Bush Empire in London and he headlined his first arena show at 3Arena on 9 December in Dublin and played to 15,000 fans. James also won the 'Breaking Artist' award at the 2016 Music Business Worldwide A&R Awards on 2 November.

James collaborated with Australian hip hop trio Bliss n Eso on the ARIA award-winning song "Moments" in 2017.

=== 2015–present: Bitter Pill, Only Ticket Home, Boxes and The Sweetest Part ===
Work began on James' debut album Bitter Pill in 2015. It was recorded in London and Los Angeles with producers Fraser T. Smith and Cam Blackwood. James said of the album: "I've always wanted to hear how my songs would sound properly produced, but I didn't want them to lose the edge they had live. We recorded the song Bitter Pill first and once we found the sound for that the rest was easy." Bitter Pill was released in Ireland on in November 2015 and was subsequently certified Platinum. It was later released worldwide in March 2016. Album track "22" was later used in the 10th episode of the 13th season of the American TV series House Hunters.

In October 2017, James released the lead single "Hearts on Fire" from his second album. In April 2018, he released the single "Always", which was a radio hit across Europe and Brazil. Third single "Glow" was released in September 2018, followed by the release of James' second studio album Only Ticket Home in October.

In October 2020, James released his album, "Boxes." It reached #1 on the Irish Recorded Music Association (IRMA) charts.

In July 2022, James released his album "The Sweetest Part". It reached #1 on the Irish Recorded Music Association (IRMA) charts.

=== Singles and EPs ===
The Mark McCabe remix of "Nervous (The Ooh Song)" has been streamed over 170 million times to date and certified double platinum in Ireland, Sweden, Norway and Holland.

Winter Songs, a collection of Christmas songs recorded by James, was released in November 2016 and achieved over three million streams on Spotify as well as airplay across Europe and the US.

== Discography ==
=== Albums ===
==== Studio albums ====
Title	Album details	Peak chart positions					
Title	Album details	IRE	BEL (Fl)	FRA	NL	SWI	UK
Bitter Pill	Released: 12 March 2016; Label: Capitol, Sony, Warner, Good Soldier Songs; Formats: CD, LP, download	5	33	170	17	28	52
Only Ticket Home	Released: 26 October 2018; Label: Capitol; Formats: CD, LP, download	2	—	—	86	31	—
Boxes	Released: 2 October 2020; Label: Capitol; Formats: CD, LP, download	1	—	—	—	—	—
The Sweetest Part	Released: 22 July 2022; Label: GS Allpoints; Formats: CD, LP, download	1	—	—	—	47	—
Goldrush	Released: 12 September 2025; Label: Sony Music; Formats: CD, LP, download	1	—	—	—	—	—

==== Live albums ====
Title	Album details	Peak chart positions	
Title	Album details	BEL (Fl)	NED
Live at Whelans	Released: 6 January 2015; Label: Good Soldier Songs; Formats: CD, LP, download	70	35

=== Extended plays ===
Title	Year
Remember Me	2014
For You	2015
The Book of Love EP	2015

=== Remixes ===
- 2015: For You (Remixes)

=== Singles ===
==== As lead artist ====
Title	Year	Peak positions									Certifications	Album
Title	Year	IRE	BEL (Fl)	BEL (Wa)	FRA	NED Dutch Top 40	NED Single Top 100	NOR	SWE	UK	Certifications	Album
"Say Hello"	2012	31	—	—	—	—	—	—	—	—		Non-album single
"The Book of Love"	2014	—	10	22 (Ultratip)	—	35	31	—	—	—	NVPI: Platinum	Bitter Pill
"For You"	2015	50	—	—	—	—	—	—	—	—		Bitter Pill
"Bitter Pill"	2015	49	4 (Ultratip)	—	—	—	—	—	—	—		Bitter Pill
"22"	2015	—	53 (Ultratip)	—	—	—	—	—	—	—		Bitter Pill
"Nervous"	2015	28	4 (Ultratip)	47	10	5	20	5	17	79	BPI: Silver; GLF: Platinum; IFPI NOR: 3× Platinum; NVPI: Platinum; SNEP: Gold	Bitter Pill
"Nervous (The Ooh Song)" (Mark McCabe Remix)	2016	28	4 (Ultratip)	47	10	5	20	5	17	79	BPI: Silver; GLF: Platinum; IFPI NOR: 3× Platinum; NVPI: Platinum; SNEP: Gold	Bitter Pill
"I Don't Know Why" (Danny Avila Remix)	2017	42	—	—	—	—	—	—	—	—		Bitter Pill
"City of Stars"	2017	—	—	—	—	—	—	—	—	—		Non-Album Single
"Hearts on Fire"	2017	92	—	—	—	—	—	—	—	—		Only Ticket Home
"Always"	2018	53	25 (Ultratip)	—	51	—	—	—	— (Note: "Always" did not enter the Swedish Singellista Chart, but peaked at number one on the Swedish Heatseeker Chart.)	—	GLF: Gold; IFPI NOR: Platinum; SNEP: Platinum	Only Ticket Home
"Glow"	2018	65	41	—	—	26	—	—	—	—		Only Ticket Home
"Faces"	2019	—	31 (Ultratip)	—	—	—	—	—	—	—		Only Ticket Home
"Boxes"	2020	48	—	—	—	—	—	—	—	—		TBA
"Better" (with Sam Feldt)	2022	—	—	—	—	—	—	—	—	—		TBA
"Anyway" (with Gabrielle Aplin)	2023	—	—	—	—	—	—	—	—	—		TBA
"White Noise"	2023	—	—	—	—	—	—	—	—	—		TBA
"Afterlife"	2024	—	—	—	—	—	—	—	—	—		TBA
"I Do"	2024	—	—	—	—	—	—	—	—	—		TBA
"Lovesick"	2024	—	—	—	—	—	—	—	—	—		TBA
"Heavy"	2024	—	—	—	—	—	—	—	—	—		TBA
"All My Life"	2024	—	—	—	—	—	—	—	—	—		TBA
"Storm Warning"	2025	—	—	—	—	—	—	—	—	—		
"—" denotes a recording that did not chart or was not released in that territory.

==== As featured artist ====
Title	Year	Peak positions				Certifications	Album
Title	Year	IRE	AUS	NOR	SWE	Certifications	Album
"Moments" (Bliss n Eso featuring Gavin James)	2017	—	25	—	—	ARIA: 5× Platinum	Off the Grid
"Tired" (Alan Walker featuring Gavin James)	2017	78	—	5	21	ARIA: Gold; GLF: 2× Platinum; IFPI NOR: 3× Platinum	Non-album singles
"Innocent" (Alok and Yves V featuring Gavin James)	2018	—	—	—	—		Non-album singles
"—" denotes a recording that did not chart or was not released.

=== Other charted songs ===
Title	Year	Peak positions		Album
Title	Year	IRE	BEL (Fl)	Album
"Fairytale of New York"	2016	77	—	Non-album singles
"Have Yourself a Merry Little Christmas"	2016	—	21 (Ultratip)	Non-album singles
"—" denotes a recording that did not chart or was not released in that territory.
