= Above Below and Beyond =

Studio album by Jennifer Batten
- Released: February 28, 1992
- Recorded: Fox Run; American Recording; Bossa Nova Hotel; The Hub; Le Gonks West in West Hollywood, California
- Genre: Instrumental rock, hard rock
- Length: 54:31
- Label: Voss
- Producer: Michael Sembello, Jennifer Batten

Jennifer Batten chronology
Above Below and Beyond (1992)	Jennifer Batten's Tribal Rage: Momentum (1997)

Professional ratings
Review scores
Source	Rating
AllMusic	3/5 stars

Above Below and Beyond is the first studio album by guitarist Jennifer Batten, released on February 28, 1992, through Voss Music and reissued in June 2008 through Lion Music.

== Track listing ==
No.	Title	Writer(s)	Length
1.	"Flight of the Bumble Bee"	Nikolai Rimsky-Korsakov	1:38
2.	"Ya Ain't Nothin' Like a Fast Car"	Jennifer Batten	4:55
3.	"Wanna Be Startin' Somethin'"	Michael Jackson	5:21
4.	"Respect"	Otis Redding	4:07
5.	"Cat Fight"	Batten	2:06
6.	"Headbangers Hairspray"	Batten	7:00
7.	"Whammy Damage"	Batten	1:30
8.	"Secret Lover"	Batten, Andre Berry	5:09
9.	"Voo Doo"	Michael Sembello, Dan Sembello	4:26
10.	"Cruzin the Nile"	Batten	4:26
11.	"Tar-zens Day Off"	Batten	5:55
12.	"Giant Steps (Swing)"	John Coltrane	1:44
13.	"Giant Steps (Rock)"	Coltrane	1:19
14.	"Mental Graffiti"	Batten	4:55
Total length:			54:31

== Personnel ==
- Jennifer Batten – vocals (tracks 8, 9), guitar, talk box, vocoder, arrangement, spoken vocals (tracks 2, 12), engineering, production
- Michael Sembello – vocals, vocoder, arrangement, engineering, production
- Kali of Medusa (Kali Milner) of The Immigrants – vocals (track 4)
- Greg Phillinganes – piano, bass
- Steve Klong – drums
- Shokti – drums
- Andre Berry – bass
- Robo Jaco – bass (track 13)
- Shirley Brewer Garden – background vocals (track 4)
- Kathy Collier – background vocals (track 4)
- Bret Helm – spoken vocals (track 12)
- Cruz Sembello – spoken vocals (track 12)
- Sargent Mom – spoken vocals (track 12)
- Sylmarian philharmonic
- Sylmarian percussion group
- Chris Papastephanou – engineering
- Erik Zobler – engineering
- Bud Rizzo – engineering
- Bill Cooper – engineering
- Tim Anderson – engineering
- David Bianco – engineering
- Bernie Grundman – mastering
