= Mark McCabe =

Irish music producer

- Born: Silverbridge
- Origin: Ireland
- Genres: Electronic dance music
- Occupations: Electronic musician, DJ, record producer
- Years active: 1990–present
- Labels: Abbey Discs, Universal Music, Twisted Records
- Website: www.markmccabe.ie

Mark McCabe is an Irish music producer, remixer, radio DJ and club DJ, from Newry. In 2000, he released "Maniac 2000" and it went to number one, as the second biggest-selling record ever in Ireland. In 2017, McCabe teamed up with the Sunset Bros, to release the record "I'm Feelin It", which went on to hit thirty million streams on Spotify.

McCabe has mixed the opening sequence for events, such as the Special Olympics in 2003, the 2005 and 2007 Saint Patrick's Festivals Skyfest. He has also done remixes for James Arthur, Gavin James, Ozark Henry and Dagny.

== Musical career ==
During the 1990s, McCabe presented the drivetime show on a pirate radio station in Dublin. He was signed with New York tribal house label Twisted Records. In 2000, he released "Maniac 2000" and it went to number one, as the second biggest-selling record ever in Ireland. McCabe's music successes include two Meteor Music awards, two top 10 singles and the second-biggest selling record in Ireland. McCabe collaborated in 2017 with the Sunset Bros, to release the record "I'm Feeling It", which went on to hit four million streams on Spotify; his 2016 remix of "Nervous (The Ooh Song)" has been streamed over 172 million times to date and certified double platinum in Ireland, Sweden, Norway and the Netherlands.

McCabe formerly served as a radio DJ and Head of Music at RTE 2fm and now serves as a radio DJ at iRadio.

== Discography ==
=== Singles ===
Year	Single	Peak chart positions		Album
Year	Single	IRE	UK	Album
2000	"Maniac 2000"	1	137	Single only
2001	"Love Is in the Air 2001"	9	–	Single only
2017	"I'm Feelin It (In the Air)" (with Sunset Bros)	81	24	Single only
2018	"Over Me"	–	–	Single only
"—" denotes single that did not chart or was not released.

=== Awards ===
Year	Category	Recipient	Outcome
2001	Meteor Music Awards	"Maniac 2000"	Won
