= Michael Sembello =

American musician

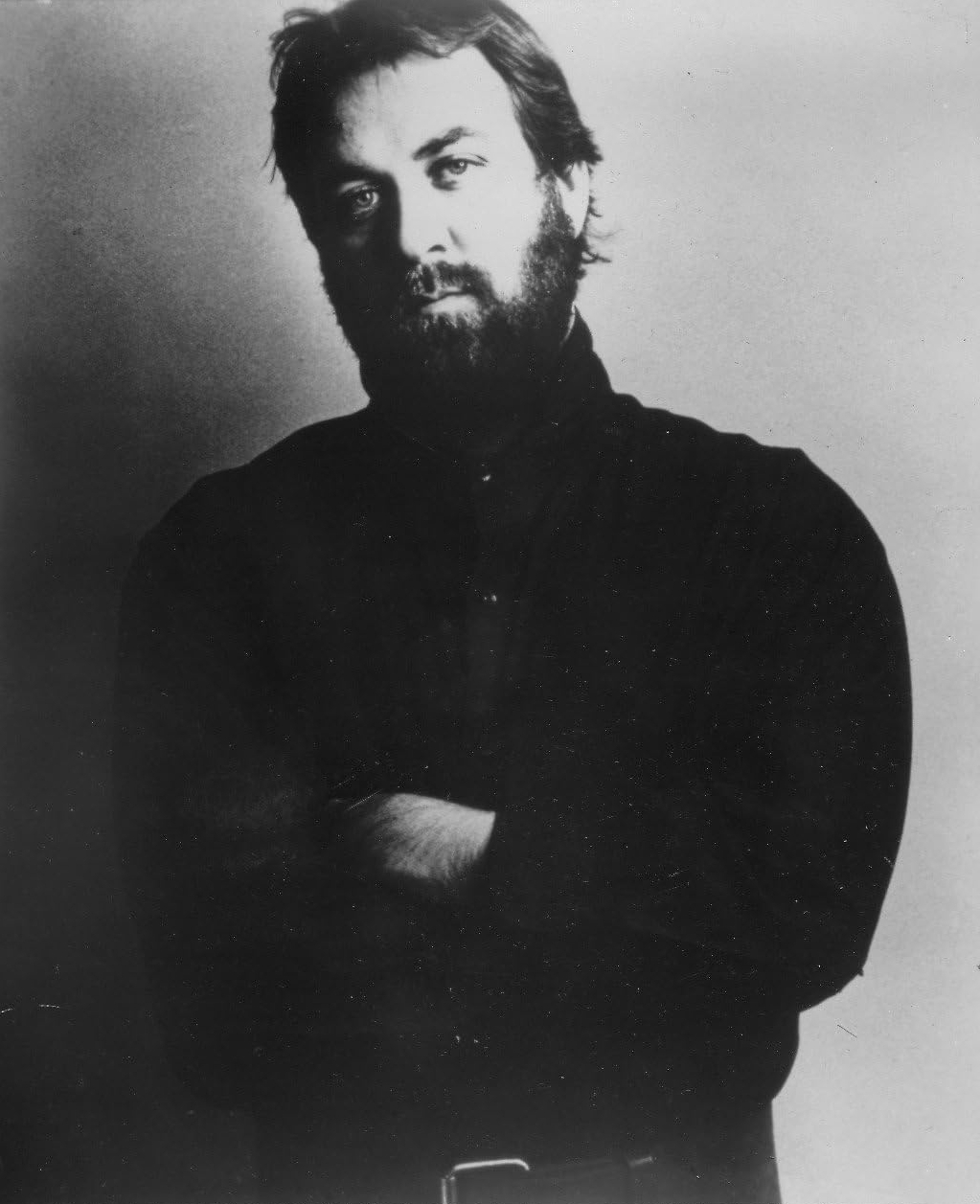
- Sembello in 1983

Background information
- Born: Michael Andrew Sembello; April 17, 1954 (age 72); Philadelphia, Pennsylvania, U.S.
- Genres: New wave; synth-pop; pop rock; hi-NRG; R&B; soul; pop; funk
- Occupations: Singer; songwriter; multi-instrumentalist; producer
- Instruments: Vocals; guitar; keyboards
- Years active: 1975–present
- Labels: Warner Bros.; EMI; A&M; Frontiers

Michael Andrew Sembello (born April 17, 1954) is an American singer, guitarist, keyboardist, songwriter, composer and producer.

He was nominated for an Academy Award and a Golden Globe for his 1983 song "Maniac", which he sang and co-wrote. The song reached number one in the United States and featured in the Flashdance film soundtrack.

== Early life ==
Sembello was born and raised in Ardmore, Pennsylvania, a western suburb of Philadelphia.

== Career ==
Sembello began his career in music as a session musician, working as a guitarist. He worked with Stevie Wonder on electric and acoustic guitar as a studio player on Wonder's Fulfillingness' First Finale (1974). He continued the same year, chosen as one of the core artists who worked on Songs in the Key of Life, an ambitious double album that took two years to create. He was credited as lead and rhythm guitarist on most of the tracks—including the intricate jazz rock lead guitar part of the instrumental "Contusion"—and shares songwriting credit with Wonder on the song "Saturn", according to the album's liner notes.

Sembello wrote the song "Mirror Mirror", a sizable hit for Diana Ross in 1981 which was No. 2 on the soul singles chart and peaking at number 8 on the Billboard Hot 100. Sembello also wrote the song "Carousel" which Michael Jackson recorded for his 1982 album Thriller, but which was replaced on the track list by "Human Nature". The song was, however, included as a bonus track on Thriller 25, the 25th-anniversary edition reissue of the album, and the full version was released on iTunes in 2013 as part of The Ultimate Fan Extras Collection. It was also included in full as part of the bonus tracks for "Thriller 40".

Sembello released his first solo album Bossa Nova Hotel in 1983. The song "Maniac" from that album, which he co-wrote with his keyboardist Dennis Matkosky, was selected for inclusion in the film Flashdance. "Maniac" was the second-best-charting song from the soundtrack (after the title track) and the ninth-biggest single of 1983. That soundtrack won a Grammy Award in 1984 for Best Album of Original Score Written for a Motion Picture or a Television Special. Sembello and Matkosky have claimed that the song was supposed to be about a vicious pet murderer after having seen a slasher flick, possibly Maniac or The Texas Chain Saw Massacre. In 2020, Sembello, along with Matkosky, appeared in Maniac Men, an interview included on the 4K UHD Blu-ray reissue of Maniac.

Sembello produced guitarist Jennifer Batten's first solo album Above Below and Beyond in 1992. In 1994, he produced Argentine singer Valeria Lynch's album Caravana de Sueños (1994), and co-wrote the title song with lyricist César Isella and composer Armando Tejada Gómez.

Sembello's songs are featured in the films Cocoon, Independence Day, Gremlins, The Monster Squad and Summer Lovers. His song "Gravity" from Cocoon was accompanied by a music video directed by the film's director Ron Howard and included an appearance by Howard in a scripted fictional foreword to the video.

In 2008, Sembello worked with saxophonist Michael Lington on his album Heat, nominated as Jazztrax Album of the Year for 2008. Michael and his brother Danny Sembello penned three songs with Lington for the project.

May 2009, Sembello assembled Bruce Gaitsch (bass, guitar) and Janey Clewer (keyboards, vocals) to form the trio The Bossa Nova Hotel, named after his 1983 Warner Bros. Records debut. They recorded the album Moon Island, released on EMI Japan. The album consists of American pop songs given arrangements with a strong Brazilian influence.

Shortly after The Bossa Nova Hotel's rendition of the jazz standard Manhã de Carnaval enjoyed success as the theme to the Japanese television series, LIFE!, the trio regrouped in 2016 to record a cover of Sting's Fragile.

Sembello has recorded his vocals in six languages.

== Personal life ==
Sembello's brothers were the songwriters Danny (1963–2015) and John Sembello (1945–2013).

== Discography ==
=== Studio albums ===
| Title | Details | Peak chart positions | |
| Title | Details | US | US R&B /HH |
|---|---|---|---|
| Bossa Nova Hotel | Released: September 1983; Label: Warner Bros.; Format: LP, CD | 80 | 53 |
| Without Walls | Released: 1986; Label: A&M; Format: LP, CD | — | — |
| Caravan of Dreams | Released: 1992; Label: Polydor; Format: LP, CD | — | — |
| Backwards in Time | Released: 1997; Label: MKD, Columbia; Format: LP, CD | — | — |
| Ancient Future | Released: 2002; Label: Legend Rec; Format: LP, CD | — | — |

=== Compilation albums ===
- The Lost Years (2003)

=== Collaboration albums ===
- The Monster Squad (1987)
- Moon Island (2009) with the Bossa Nova Hotel

=== Singles ===
| Title | Year | Peak chart positions | | | | | | | | | | Certifications | Album |
| Title | Year | US | US AC | AUS | BEL (FL) | GER | IRE | NLD | NZ | SWI | UK | Certifications | Album |
|---|---|---|---|---|---|---|---|---|---|---|---|---|---|
| "Summer Lovers" | 1982 | — | — | — | — | — | — | — | — | — | — | | Summer Lovers |
| "Maniac" | 1983 | 1 | 34 | 2 | 11 | 6 | 28 | 10 | 7 | 2 | 43 | BPI: Gold; IFPI DEN: Gold | Bossa Nova Hotel and Flashdance |
| "Automatic Man" | 1983 | 34 | — | 49 | — | 66 | — | — | — | — | — | | Bossa Nova Hotel |
| "Talk" | 1984 | — | 25 | — | — | — | — | — | — | — | — | | Bossa Nova Hotel |
| "Gremlins...Mega Madness" | 1984 | — | — | — | — | — | — | — | — | — | — | | Gremlins |
| "Gravity" | 1985 | — | — | — | — | — | — | — | — | — | — | | Without Walls and Cocoon |
| "Tear Down the Walls" | 1986 | — | — | — | — | — | — | — | — | — | — | | Without Walls |
| "Wonder Where You Are" | 1986 | — | — | — | — | — | — | — | — | — | — | | Without Walls |
| "Heavy Weather" | 1992 | — | — | — | — | — | — | — | — | — | — | | Caravan of Dreams |
| "Reach for the Dream" | 1995 | — | — | — | — | — | — | — | — | — | — | | non-album single |
"—" denotes a recording that did not chart or was not released in that territory.

== See also ==
- List of artists who reached number one in the United States
