= Bitter Pill (album) =

Studio album by Gavin James
- Released: 20 November 2015
- Recorded: 2014–2015
- Genre: Pop folk
- Label: Good Soldier Songs; Believe

Gavin James chronology
Bitter Pill (2015)	Only Ticket Home (2018)

Singles from Bitter Pill
- 1. "The Book of Love" Released: 2014; 2. "For You" Released: 2015; 3. "Bitter Pill" Released: 2015; 4. "22" Released: 2015; 5. "Nervous" Released: 2016

Bitter Pill is the debut studio album of the Irish singer-songwriter Gavin James. It was released in Ireland on 20 November 2015 and its international release was on 11 March 2016. It was released by Good Soldier Songs and Believe Recordings.

The album peaked at number 5 on the Irish Albums Chart and made it to number 52 on the UK Albums Chart. It also charted in the Netherlands, France, Belgium and Switzerland.

== Track listing ==
All tracks are written by Gavin James, except where noted.

No.	Title	Length
1.	"For You"	3:01
2.	"Nervous"	3:36
3.	"Remember Me"	3:55
4.	"Bitter Pill" (James, Jamie Scott, Sacha Skarbek)	4:00
5.	"Coming Home"	3:55
6.	"I Don't Know Why"	3:58
7.	"22"	3:40
8.	"Ghost"	4:08
9.	"Hole in My Heart"	3:02
10.	"Say Hello"	3:13
11.	"Two Hearts"	3:57
12.	"Till The Sun Comes Up" (James, Skarbek)	3:56
13.	"The Book of Love" (Stephin Merritt)	2:57

=== Deluxe edition ===
A limited deluxe edition was released in two CDs, CD 1 being the original album and CD containing live renditions of the tracks. In addition, the set included signed album card.

CD 1 Same as above

CD 2

No.	Title	Length
1.	"For You"	2:50
2.	"Nervous"	3:38
3.	"I Don't Know Why"	3:44
4.	"Coming Home"	4:31
5.	"Till The Sun Comes Up"	3:55
6.	"Hole in My Heart"	3:08
7.	"22"	3:01
8.	"Great Escape"	2:55
9.	"Ghost"	3:52
10.	"Say Hello"	3:29
11.	"Two Hearts"	4:44
12.	"The Book of Love"	3:10
13.	"Bitter Pill"	3:36

== Singles ==
Five tracks from the album have been released as singles:

- 2014: "The Book of Love
- 2015: "For You"
- 2015: "Bitter Pill"
- 2015: "22"
- 2016: "Nervous"

== Charts ==
Chart performance for Bitter Pill
Chart (2013)	Peak position
Belgian Albums (Ultratop Flanders)	33
Belgian Albums (Ultratop Wallonia)	171
Dutch Albums (Album Top 100)	17
French Albums (SNEP)	170
Irish Albums (IRMA)	5
Swiss Albums (Schweizer Hitparade)	28
UK Albums (OCC)	52

== Certifications ==
Certifications for Bitter Pill
Region	Certification	Certified units/sales
Norway (IFPI Norway)	Platinum	20,000^{‡}
^{‡} Sales+streaming figures based on certification alone.
