= The Cat Empire discography =

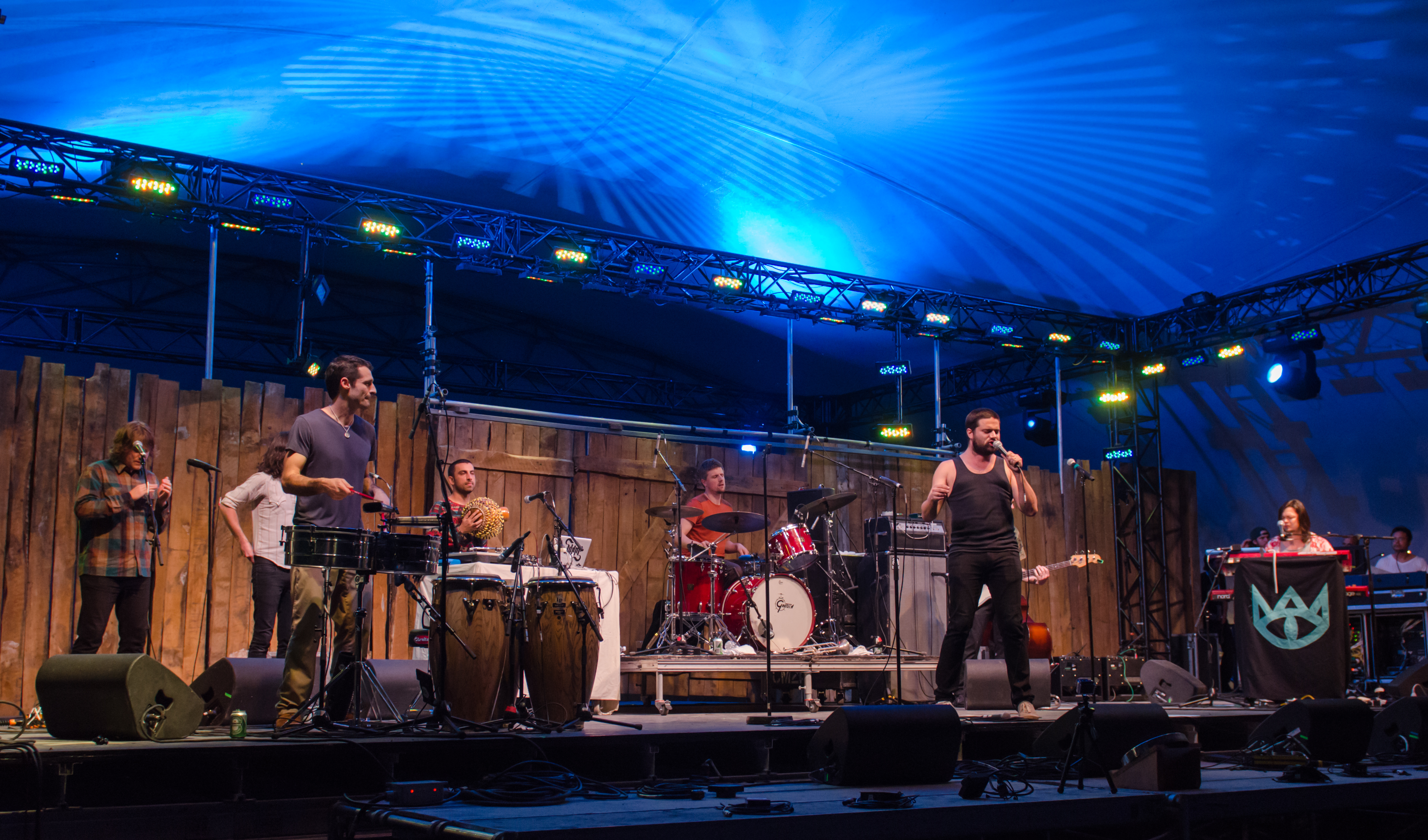
- The Cat Empire at the 2013 Winnipeg Folk Festival
- Studio albums: 10
- Extended plays: 3
- Live albums: 4
- Compilation albums: 3
- Singles: 44
- Video albums: 2

The discography of the Australian jazz and funk band the Cat Empire consists of ten studio albums, four live albums, three compilation albums, two video albums, three extended plays, and forty-four singles. The band has scored two number-one albums and six top ten albums on the ARIA Charts. They have been nominated for twelve ARIA Music Awards, of which they have won one. (Note: Attributed to multiple references.) They were formed in 1999 by founding members Felix Riebl, Ollie McGill, and Ryan Monro. Long-term members Harry James Angus, Jamshid Khadiwala and Will Hull-Brown joined the band in 2001.

The group independently released a live extended play, Live @ Adelphia, in December 2001, and their first live album, The Sun, in July 2002. In October 2003, "Hello" was released as the lead single from The Cat Empire. Later that month, the album was released under Virgin Records, peaking at number 15 on the ARIA Charts and giving the group mainstream recognition. It went on to be certified 3× platinum by the Australian Recording Industry Association (ARIA) for shipment of 210,000 copies in 2012.

In April 2005, they released their second studio album, Two Shoes, which provided two top-fifty singles and debuted at the top of the Australian charts. It became their first international release when it was reissued in Canada the following year. In March 2006, they performed at the 2006 Commonwealth Games opening ceremony to a crowd of over 75,000. The music recorded for the event was released the following month as Cities. Their fourth album, So Many Nights, was released in September 2007, reaching number two on the ARIA charts. The lead single from that album, "No Longer There", is their highest-charting to date, peaking at number 12. In 2009, they released their second live album, Live on Earth, which collects concert recordings taken from shows between August 2006 and December 2008. They released their fifth album, Cinema, in June 2010. Critics dubbed it a more mature effort than the group's previous albums. It debuted at number three on the album charts.

Their sixth studio album and first via an independent label, Steal the Light, was released in May 2013, peaking at number three. Critics considered the album to be "a return to their original aesthetic". It was the first release in a trilogy of three conceptually similar albums by the group produced by Jan Skubiszewski. The second album in that trilogy, Rising with the Sun, was released in March 2016, debuting at number one. From July 2018 to February 2019, the band released a new single on the first of every month, leading up to the release of their eighth album, Stolen Diamonds. In 2021, the original lineup disbanded after a final show at the 2022 Byron Bay Bluesfest, except for founding members Riebl and McGill. By late 2022, new members Grace Barbé, Daniel Farrugia, Neda Rahmani and Lazaro Numa had joined, (Note: Attributed to multiple references.) and the group released their ninth album, Where the Angels Fall, in August 2023.

== Albums ==
=== Studio albums ===
List of studio albums, showing title, details, selected chart positions and certifications
Title	Details	Peak chart positions			Certifications
Title	Details	AUS	NLD	SWI	Certifications
The Cat Empire	Released: 24 October 2003; Label: EMI, Virgin; Format: CD	15	—	—	ARIA: 3× Platinum
Two Shoes	Released: 19 April 2005; Label: EMI, Virgin; Format: CD, digital download	1	—	—	ARIA: Platinum
Cities: The Cat Empire Project	Released: 1 April 2006; Label: EMI, Virgin; Format: CD, digital download	11	—	—	
So Many Nights	Released: 22 September 2007; Label: EMI, Virgin, Velour; Format: CD, digital download	2	—	—	ARIA: Gold
Cinema	Released: 25 June 2010; Label: EMI, Virgin, Velour; Format: CD, digital download	3	—	—	
Steal the Light	Released: 17 May 2013; Label: Two Shoes; Format: CD, digital download	3	88	—	
Rising with the Sun	Released: 4 March 2016; Label: Two Shoes; Format: CD, digital download	1	—	51	
Stolen Diamonds	Released: 15 February 2019; Label: Two Shoes; Format: CD, digital download	4	—	—	
Where the Angels Fall	Released: 25 August 2023; Label: Two Shoes; Format: CD, LP, digital download	73	—	—	
Bird in Paradise	Released: 7 March 2025; Label: BMG Australia	18	—	—	
"—" denotes releases that failed to chart or were not released in that country.

=== Live albums ===
List of live albums, showing title, details, chart positions and notes
Title	Album details	Peak chart positions
Title	Album details	AUS
The Sun	Released: July 2002; Label: Self-released; Format: CD	—
Live on Earth	Released: 20 February 2009; Label: EMI; Format: 2CD	14
The Cat Empire (Live from Melbourne, December 2021) [Original Line-up Final Tour]	Released: 15 April 2022; Label: Two Shoes; Format: digital	—
Live at Sydney Opera House	Released: 22 May 2026; Label: Cat Empire / BMG; Format: digital	—
"—" denotes releases that did not chart.

=== Compilation albums ===
List of compilation albums, showing title, details and notes
Title	Details	Notes
Tapes, Breaks and Out-Takes	Released: 1 June 2003; Label: Self-released; Format: CD	A compilation of outtakes from The Cat Empire (2003), and tracks from Live @ Adelphia and The Sun. The interludes were recorded at rehearsals and gigs.
Asylum	Released: 28 October 2011; Label: Self-released; Format: digital	Released in association with the organization Tunes for Change as a pay-what-you-want download. A compilation of rare recordings and songs by the members' side projects, the release aimed to raise AU$50,000 for the Asylum Seeker Resource Centre.
The Adelphia Sessions	Released: 2 November 2021; Label: Two Shoes; Format: digital	A selection of tracks from Live @ Adelphia and The Sun.

=== Video albums ===
List of video albums, showing title, details and certifications
Title	Details	Certifications
On the Attack	Released: 2004; Label: Virgin; Format: DVD, CD	ARIA: Gold
Live at the Bowl	Released: 20 February 2009; Label: EMI; Format: 2DVD	ARIA: Gold

== Extended plays ==
List of extended plays, showing title, details and notes
Title	Details	Notes	Ref.
Live @ Adelphia	Released: December 2001; Label: Self-released; Format: CD	Recorded live at Adelphia Studios in a single day. Features early versions of future tracks.	
The Cat Empire	Released: 2006; Label: Velour; Format: CD	A selection of tracks from The Cat Empire and Two Shoes, plus three videos. Designed as an introduction to the American market.	
Live at Martyrs'	Released: 2007; Label: Velour; Format: CD	Recorded live at Martyrs' in 2007 for WXRT's Sunday Night Concert. Features performances of tracks from The Cat Empire and Two Shoes.	

== Singles ==
List of singles, showing year released, chart positions and album name
Title	Year	Peak chart positions			Album
Title	Year	AUS	NZ	NL	Album
"Hello"	2003	(Note: "Hello" was released to radio as a promotional single in Australia, and was ineligible to chart in 2003.)	12	—	The Cat Empire
"Days Like These"	2004	37	—	—	The Cat Empire
"The Chariot"	2004	34	—	—	The Cat Empire
"One Four Five"	2004	—	—	—	The Cat Empire
"Sly"	2005	23	—	—	Two Shoes
"The Car Song"	2005	46	—	—	Two Shoes
"Two Shoes"	2005	77	—	—	Two Shoes
"Down at the 303" (Live)	2007	—	—	—	Non-album single
"No Longer There"	2007	12	—	—	So Many Nights
"So Many Nights"	2007	—	—	—	So Many Nights
"Fishies"	2008	99	—	—	So Many Nights
"How to Explain?" (Live at the Sidney Myer Music Bowl)	2009	—	—	—	Live on Earth
"Feeling's Gone"	2010	—	—	—	Cinema
"On My Way"	2010	—	—	—	Cinema
"Brighter Than Gold"	2013	68	—	33	Steal the Light
"Steal the Light"	2013	—	—	—	Steal the Light
"Qué Será Ahora"	2015	—	—	—	Rising with the Sun
"Wolves"	2015	—	—	—	Rising with the Sun
"Bulls"	2016	—	—	—	Rising with the Sun
"Ready Now"	2018	—	—	—	Stolen Diamonds
"Stolen Diamonds"	2018	—	—	—	Stolen Diamonds
"La Sirène"	2018	—	—	—	Stolen Diamonds
"Kila"	2018	—	—	—	Stolen Diamonds
"Sola" (featuring Depedro)	2018	—	—	—	Stolen Diamonds
"Barricades"	2018	—	—	—	Stolen Diamonds
"Oscar Wilde"	2018	—	—	—	Stolen Diamonds
"Echoes"	2019	—	—	—	Stolen Diamonds
"Oscar Wilde" (featuring Grace Barbé) (Live at Odeon Theatre)	2019	—	—	—	Non-album singles
"Going to Live"	2021	—	—	—	Non-album singles
"Great Beauty"	2021	—	—	—	Non-album singles
"Coming to Meet You"	2021	—	—	—	Non-album singles
"The Scream"	2021	—	—	—	Non-album singles
"Sparrow"	2021	—	—	—	Non-album singles
"Into the Night"	2021	—	—	—	Non-album singles
"The Crowd"	2022	—	—	—	The Cat Empire (Live from Melbourne, December 2021) [Original Line-up Final Tour]
"Still Young"	2022	—	—	—	The Cat Empire (Live from Melbourne, December 2021) [Original Line-up Final Tour]
"Thunder Rumbles"	2023	—	—	—	Where the Angels Fall
"Rock 'n' Roll"	2023	—	—	—	Where the Angels Fall
"Money Coming My Way"	2023	—	—	—	Where the Angels Fall
"Owl"	2023	—	—	—	Where the Angels Fall
"How to Explain" (Anniversary Edition)	2023	—	—	—	Non-album singles
"Hello" (Anniversary Edition)	2023	—	—	—	Non-album singles
"La Gracia"	2024	—	—	—	Bird in Paradise
"Blood on the Stage"	2024	—	—	—	Bird in Paradise
"Doing Fine"	2024	—	—	—	Bird in Paradise
"Devil"	2025	—	—	—	Bird in Paradise
"Bird in Paradise"	2025	—	—	—	Bird in Paradise
"Rocket"	2026	—	—	—	Bells of Midnight
"Bells of Midnight"	2026	—	—	—	Bells of Midnight
"—" denotes items which failed to chart or was not released in that country.

== Other appearances ==
List of other appearances, showing title, year of release and parent album
Title	Year	Album	Ref.
"Hotel California"	2005	Triple J: Like a Version	
"Sunny Afternoon"	2009	Triple J: Like a Version, Volume Five	
"Zero" (with Anbessa Gebrehiwot)	2010	The Key of Sea	
"Get Some"	2016	Triple J: Like a Version, Volume 12	
"Som Foc" (with Txarango)	2017	El Cor de la Terra	

== Music videos ==
Title	Year	Director(s)
"Hello"	2003	Felix Riebl, Ian McGill, Mike Reed
"Days Like These"	2003	Mike Metzner
"The Chariot"	2004	Felix Riebl, Ian McGill, Mike Reed
"One Four Five"	2004	—
"Sly"	2005	Susi Stitt
"The Car Song"	2005	Ben Quinn
"Two Shoes"	2005	Michael Delaney
"No Longer There"	2007	—
"So Many Nights"	2007	—
"Fishies"	2008	Various
"Feelings Gone"	2010	—
"Brighter than Gold"	2013	Nicholas Verso
"Steal the Light"	2013	Ash Koek
"Like a Drum"	2013	Dominic Allen, Martin Pimentel
"Wolves"	2015	Guy Franklin
"Bulls"	2016	Darcy Prendergast
"Ready Now"	2018	Dominic Allen (Note: Attributed to multiple references:)
"Stolen Diamonds"	2018	Dominic Allen
"La Sirène"	2018	Dominic Allen
"Kila"	2018	Dominic Allen
"Sola"	2018	Dominic Allen
"Barricades"	2018	Dominic Allen
"Oscar Wilde"	2019	Dominic Allen
"Echoes"	2019	Dominic Allen
"Thunder Rumbles"	2023	Nick Campbell
"Rock 'n' Roll"	2023	Giulia Giannini McGauran
"Money Coming My Way"	2023	Josh Harris
"Boom Boom"	2023	Nick Campbell
"La Gracia"	2024	Dara Munnis
"Blood on the Stage"	2024	Dara Munnis
"Doing Fine"	2024	Dara Munnis

== See also ==
- List of songs recorded by the Cat Empire
