= List of songs recorded by the Cat Empire =

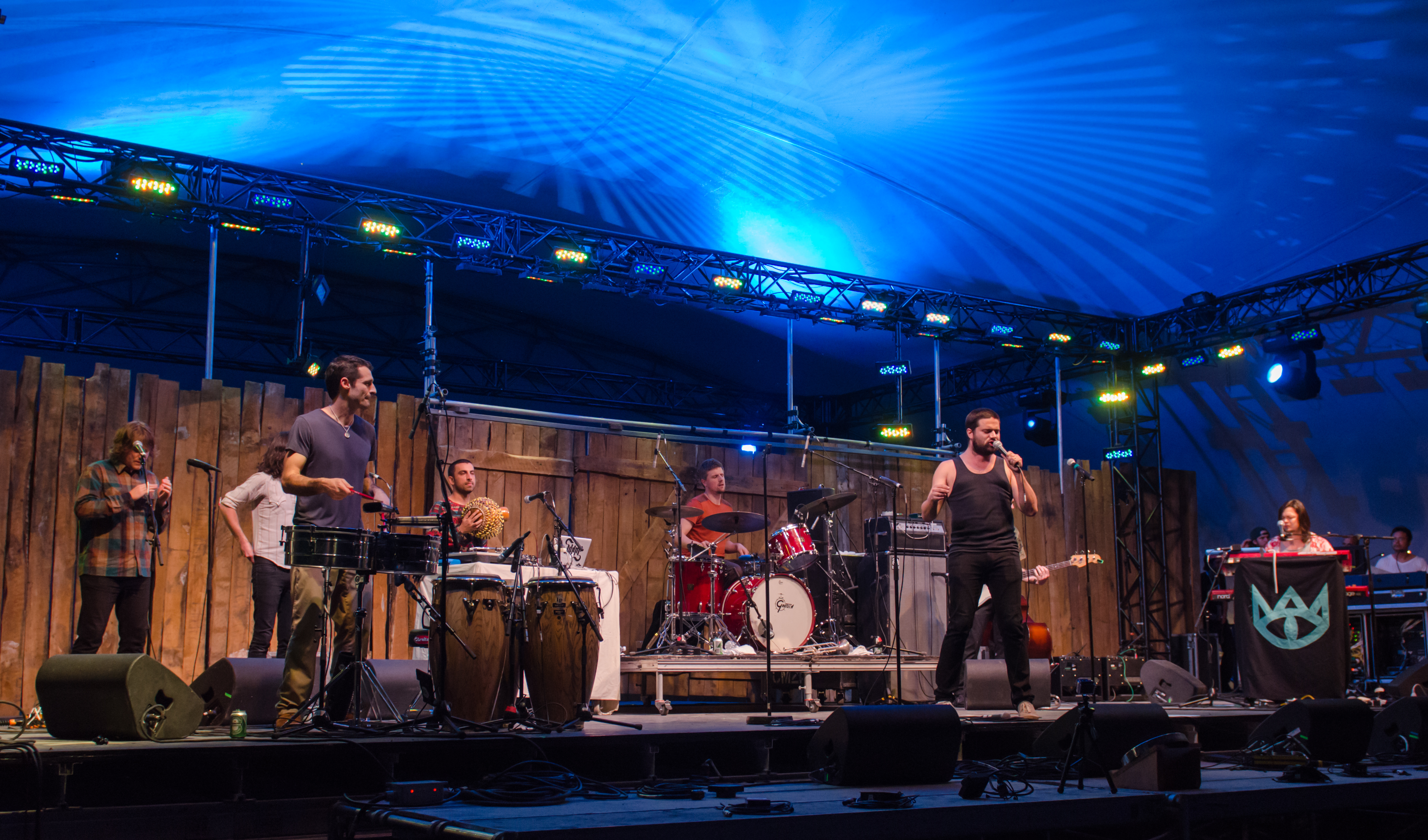
The Cat Empire at the 2013 Winnipeg Folk Festival

Australian jazz/funk band the Cat Empire have recorded over 144 songs throughout their career. The group was founded in Melbourne, in 1999 by Felix Riebl (vocals, percussion), Ollie McGill (keyboards) and Ryan Monro (bass). The trio expanded in 2001 to include Harry James Angus (vocals, trumpet), Jamshid "Jumps" Khadiwala (turntables, percussion) and Will Hull-Brown (drums). Their musical style has been described as a fusion of jazz, ska, reggae and hip-hop, with heavy Latin influences.

== Songs ==
Key
†	Indicates single release
‡	Indicates song not written or co-written by the Cat Empire

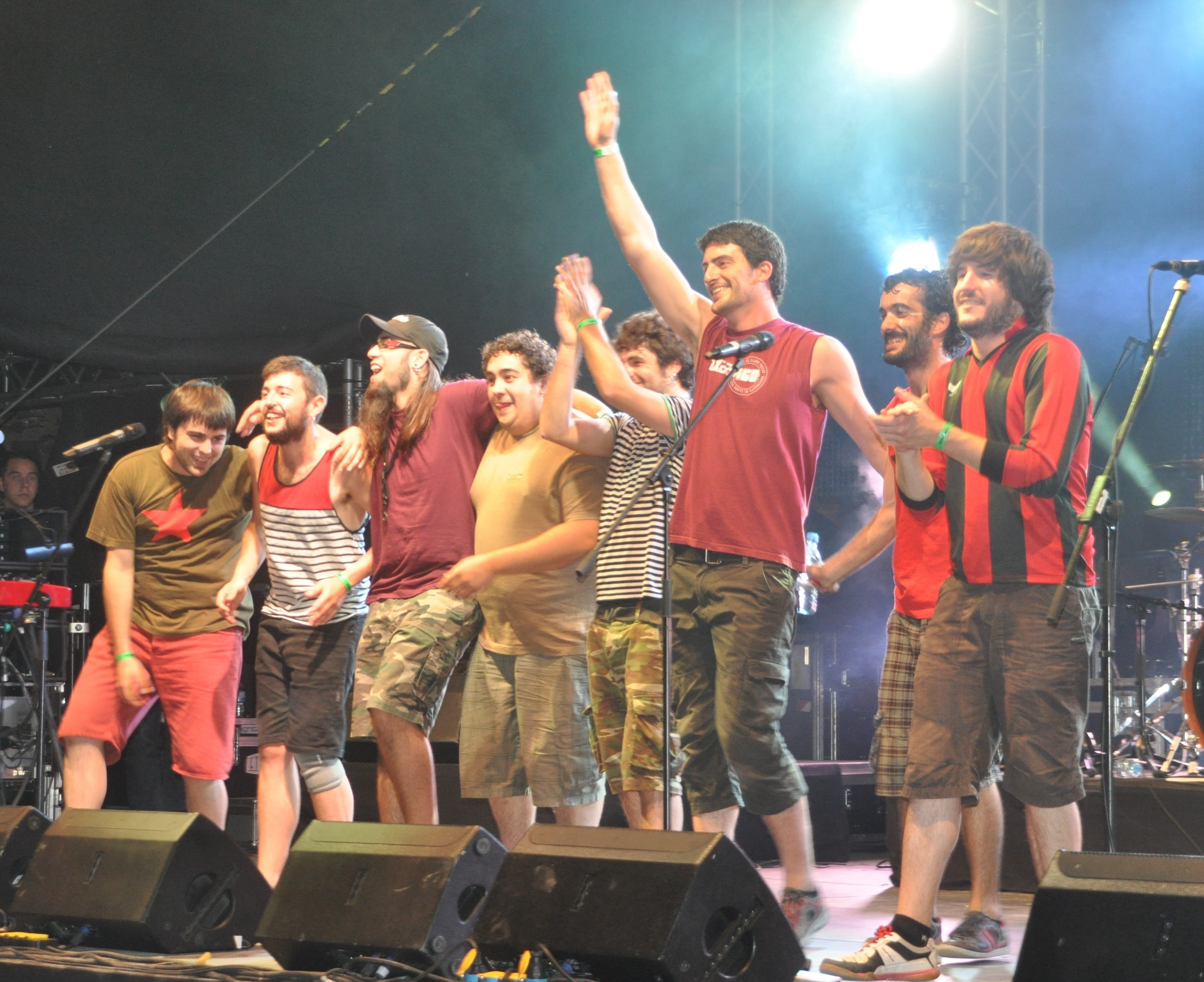
The Cat Empire were featured on the Spanish band Txarango's song "Som Foc".

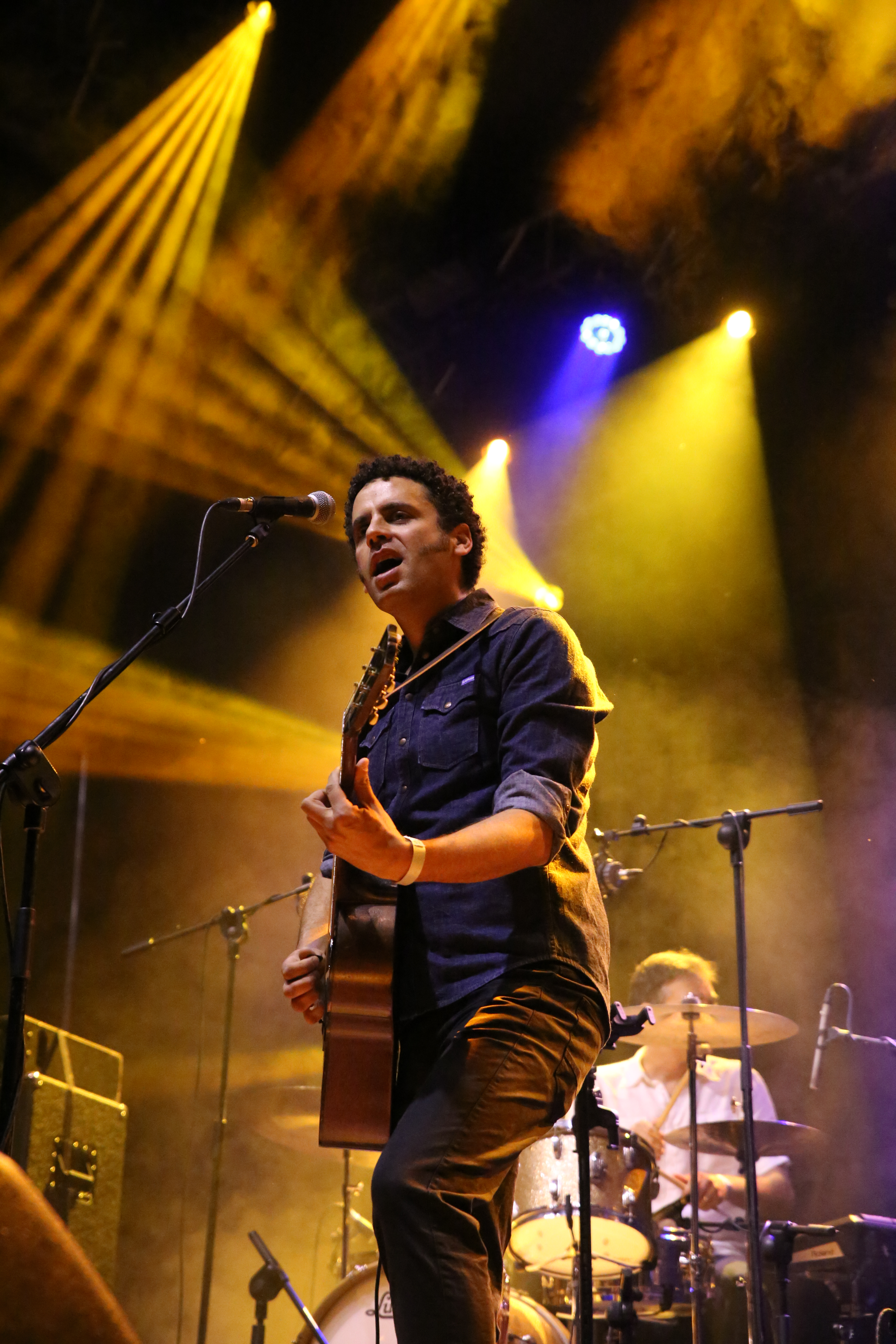
The Cat Empire collaborated with the Spanish singer-songwriter Depedro (pictured in 2017) for the song "Sola".

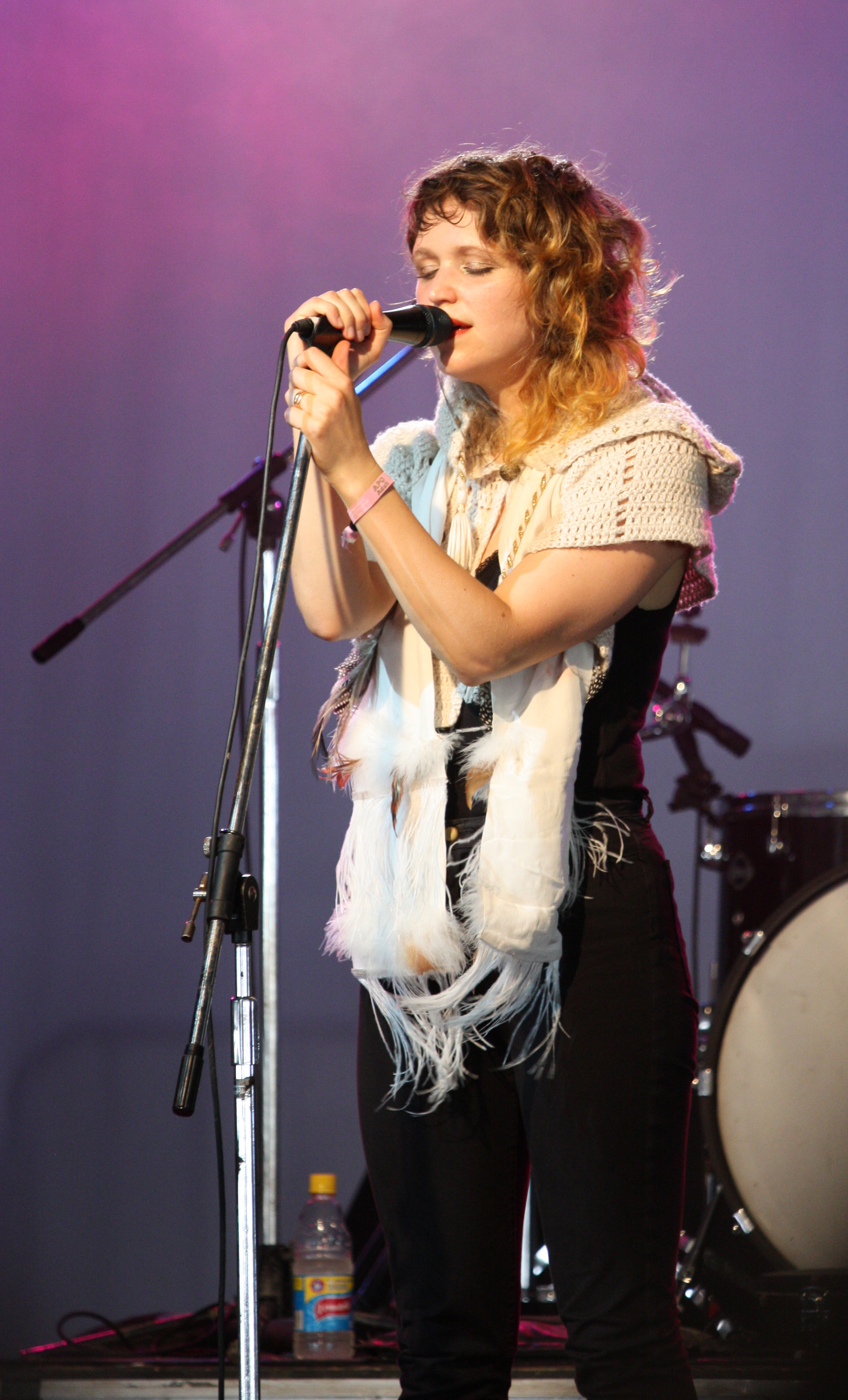
Emily Lubitz (pictured in 2010) of the Australian band Tinpan Orange performed backing vocals on "Midnight".

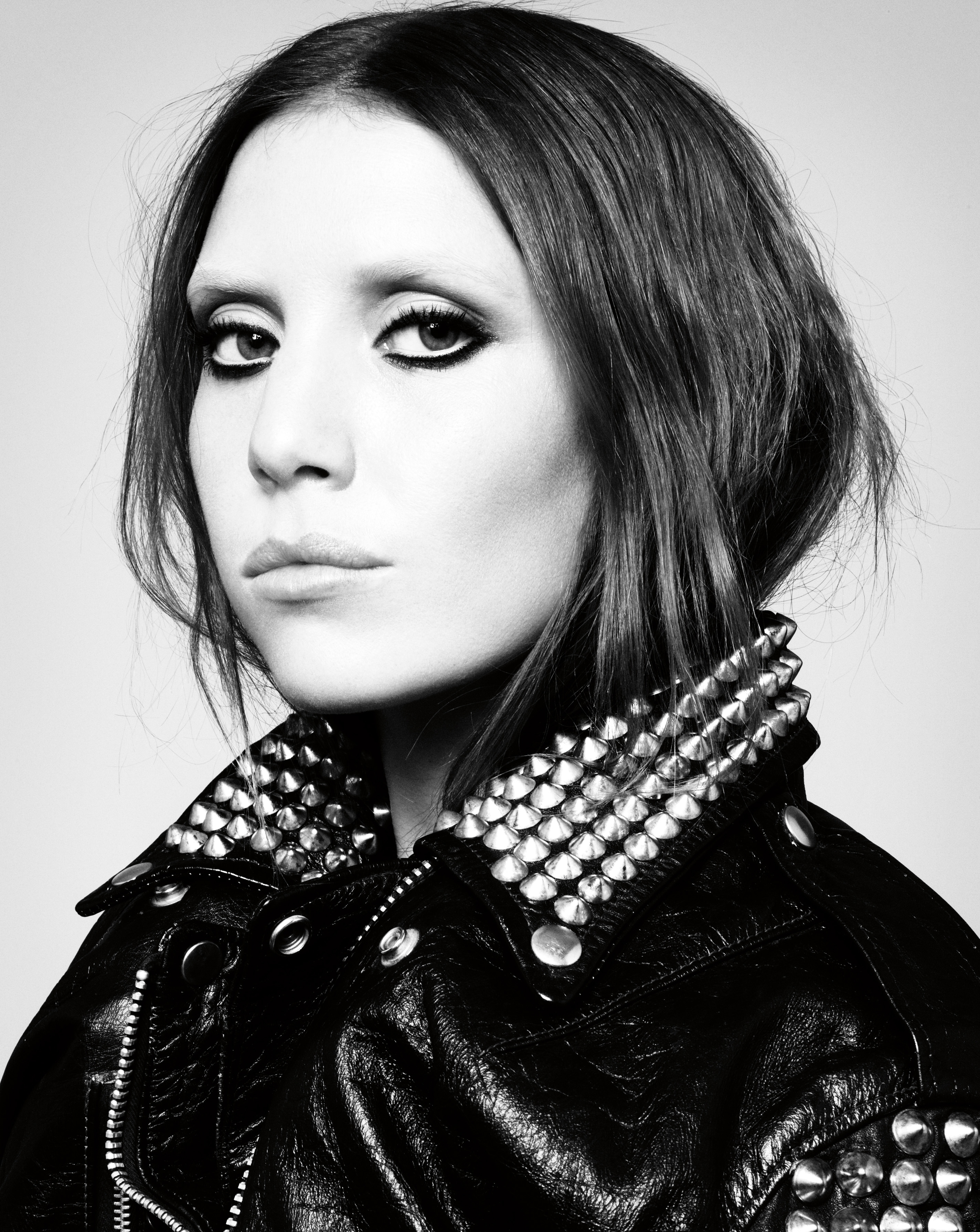
The Cat Empire covered "Get Some" by Lykke Li for Triple J's radio segment Like a Version.

List of released songs, showing title, songwriters, original release and year
Title	Writers	Original release	Year	Ref.
"1001" (hidden track)	Felix Riebl	Two Shoes	2005	
"Adelphia"	Harry James Angus	Stolen Diamonds	2019	
"All Hell"	Harry James Angus; Felix Riebl	Cinema	2010	
"All Night Loud"	Felix Riebl	Steal the Light	2013	
"All That Talking"	Felix Riebl	The Cat Empire	2003	
"Alle Walle"	Felix Riebl	Live at the Paradiso	2017	
"Am I Wrong"	Harry James Angus; Jamshid Khadiwala; Felix Riebl	Steal the Light	2013	
"Anybody"	Harry James Angus; Felix Riebl	Stolen Diamonds	2019	
"Anymore"	Felix Riebl	Cities	2006	
"Barricades" †	Harry James Angus; Ollie McGill; Jan Skubiszewski	Stolen Diamonds	2018	
"Bataclan"	Felix Riebl	Rising with the Sun	2016	
"Be With You Again"	Felix Riebl	Where the Angels Fall	2023	
"Beanni"	Felix Riebl	The Cat Empire	2003	
"Beyond All"	Harry James Angus; Will Hull-Brown; Jamshid Khadiwala; Ollie McGill; Ryan Monro; Felix Riebl	Cinema	2010	
"Blasting Away"	Felix Riebl	Rising with the Sun	2016	
"Blood on the Stage"	Roscoe James Irwin; Lazaro Numa; Felix Riebl	Bird in Paradise	2024	
"Boogaloo"	Roscoe James Irwin; Felix Riebl	Cities	2006	
"Boom Boom"	Roscoe James Irwin; Ollie McGill; Felix Riebl	Where the Angels Fall	2023	
"Bow Down to Love"	Harry James Angus	Stolen Diamonds	2019	
"Brighter than Gold" †	Harry James Angus; Felix Riebl	Steal the Light	2013	
"Bulls" †	Felix Riebl	Rising with the Sun	2016	
"Call Me Home"	Roscoe James Irwin; Felix Riebl	Cinema	2010	
"The Car Song" †	Harry James Angus	Two Shoes	2005	
"The Chariot" (Note: A studio recording was later released on The Cat Empire (2003)) †	Felix Riebl	The Sun	2002	
"Cities"	Harry James Angus; Felix Riebl	Cities	2006	
"Coming Back Again"	Felix Riebl	Where the Angels Fall	2023	
"Coming to Meet You" †	Harry James Angus; Felix Riebl	Non-album single	2021	
"Confide in Me" (Kylie Minogue cover featuring Owl Eyes)	Steve Anderson; Owain Barton; Dave Seaman ‡	Non-album single	2015	
"The Conspiracy"	Felix Riebl	Live @ Adelphia	2001	
"Creature"	Harry James Angus; Felix Riebl	Rising with the Sun	2016	
"The Crowd"	Harry James Angus	The Sun	2002	
"Daggers Drawn"	Harry James Angus	Rising with the Sun	2016	
"Dance the Night Away"	Felix Riebl	Where the Angels Fall	2023	
"The Darkness"	Harry James Angus	So Many Nights	2007	
"Days Like These" †	Harry James Angus; Ollie McGill; Felix Riebl	The Cat Empire	2003	
"Days Loop"	Felix Riebl	B-side of "Days Like These"	2004	
"Deeper"	Ollie McGill; Felix Riebl	Where the Angels Fall	2023	
"Don't Throw Your Hands Up"	Harry James Angus	Steal the Light	2013	
"Down at the 303"	Harry James Angus	Cities	2006	
"Drift Away"	Grace Barbé; Felix Riebl	Where the Angels Fall	2023	
"Dumb Things" (Paul Kelly cover)	Paul Kelly ‡	Live on Earth	2009	
"Eagle"	Harry James Angus; Will Hull-Brown; Jamshid Khadiwala; Ollie McGill; Ryan Monro; Felix Riebl	Rising with the Sun	2016	
"East"	Harry James Angus	B-side of "Hello"	2003	
"Echoes" †	Harry James Angus	Stolen Diamonds	2019	
"Falling"	Harry James Angus; Ross Irwin; Ollie McGill; Felix Riebl	Cinema	2010	
"Feeling's Gone" †	Harry James Angus; Ollie McGill; Ryan Monro; Felix Riebl; Steve Schram	Cinema	2010	
"Feline"	Felix Riebl	Asylum	2011	
"Fishies" †	Harry James Angus; Felix Riebl	So Many Nights	2007	
"Flags"	Felix Riebl	Pre-order bonus track for Rising with the Sun	2016	
"Get Some" (Lykke Li cover)	Lykke Li; Björn Yttling ‡	Triple J: Like a Version 12	2016	
"Go"	Harry James Angus; Jan Skubiszewski	Steal the Light	2013	
"Going to Live" †	Cristina Recio Lafuente; Felix Riebl	Non-album single	2021	
"Great Beauty" †	Harry James Angus; Felix Riebl	Non-album single	2021	
"The Heart is a Cannibal"	Harry James Angus; Ollie McGill	Cinema	2010	
"Hello" (Note: Re-recorded versions were later released on The Sun (2002) and The Cat Empire (2003)) †	Harry James Angus; Felix Riebl	Live @ Adelphia	2001	
"L'Hotel de Californie" (Eagles cover)	Don Felder; Glenn Frey; Don Henley ‡	On the Attack	2004	
"How to Explain"	Felix Riebl	The Cat Empire	2003	
"In My Pocket"	Harry James Angus	Two Shoes	2005	
"Into the Night" †	Felix Riebl	Non-album single	2021	
"Intro"	Harry James Angus; Felix Riebl	On the Attack	2004	
"Jungle"	Harry James Angus	Cities	2006	
"Kila" †	Felix Riebl	Stolen Diamonds	2018	
"Know Your Name"	Felix Riebl	Cities	2006	
"La Gracia" †	Grace Barbé; Lazaro Numa; Felix Riebl	Bird in Paradise	2024	
"La Sirène" † (with Eloise Mignon)	Ollie McGill; Eloise Mignon; Felix Riebl	Stolen Diamonds	2018	
"Like a Drum"	Ryan Monro; Jamshid Khadiwala; Felix Riebl	Steal the Light	2013	
"Lonely Moon"	Harry James Angus	So Many Nights	2007	
"The Lost Song"	Felix Riebl	Live @ Adelphia	2001	
"Lover Lover Lover" (Leonard Cohen cover)	Leonard Cohen ‡	Pre-order bonus track for Rising with the Sun	2016	
"Luck Song"	Ollie McGill; Felix Riebl	Cities	2006	
"Lullaby"	Felix Riebl	Two Shoes	2005	
"Manifesto"	Harry James Angus	The Cat Empire	2003	
"Manifesto/Rhythm Interlude"	Harry James Angus; Ollie McGill; Felix Riebl	B-side of "Days Like These"	2004	
"Midnight"	Harry James Angus	Rising with the Sun	2016	
"Miserere"	Felix Riebl	Two Shoes	2005	
"Miss Soul"	Felix Riebl	iTunes bonus track for Cities	2006	
"Money Coming My Way" †	Andy Baldwin; Roscoe James Irwin; Ollie McGill; Felix Riebl	Where the Angels Fall	2023	
"The Mother Place" (Note: A studio recording was later released as a B-side to "The Car Song" (2005))	Felix Riebl	The Sun	2002	
"Motion"	Felix Riebl	Cities	2006	
"The Night That Never End" (Note: A studio recording was later released on Two Shoes (2005))	Ollie McGill; Felix Riebl	The Sun	2002	
"No Longer There" †	Felix Riebl	So Many Nights	2007	
"No Mountain"	Felix Riebl	So Many Nights	2007	
"No Sense" (Note: A studio recording was later released as a B-side to "Sly" (2005))	Felix Riebl	Live @ Adelphia	2001	
"Nothing"	Felix Riebl	The Cat Empire	2003	
"Oh Mercy"	Harry James Angus; Neda Rahmani; Felix Riebl	Where the Angels Fall	2023	
"Old Dog, New Trick"	Roscoe James Irwin; Ollie McGill; Felix Riebl	Where the Angels Fall	2023	
"On My Way" †	Harry James Angus; Will Hull-Brown; Ollie McGill; Ryan Monro; Felix Riebl	Cinema	2010	
"One, Four, Five" †	Felix Riebl	Where the Angels Fall	2003	
"Only Light"	Harry James Angus; Roscoe James Irwin; Ollie McGill; Ryan Monro	Cinema	2010	
"Open Up Your Face"	Harry James Angus	Steal the Light	2013	
"Oscar Wilde" †	Harry James Angus; Felix Riebl	Stolen Diamonds	2018	
"Owl" †	Roscoe James Irwin; Ollie McGill; Felix Riebl; Richard Tedesco	Where the Angels Fall	2023	
"Panama"	Felix Riebl	So Many Nights	2007	
"Party Started"	Harry James Angus; Ollie McGill; Felix Riebl	Two Shoes	2005	
"Prophets in the Sky"	Harry James Angus; Will Hull-Brown; Jamshid Khadiwala; Ollie McGill; Ryan Monro; Felix Riebl	Steal the Light	2013	
"Protons, Neutrons, Electrons"	Harry James Angus	Two Shoes	2005	
"Qué Será Ahora"	Harry James Angus; Felix Riebl	Rising with the Sun	2015	
"Radio Song"	Felix Riebl	So Many Nights	2007	
"Ready Now"	Felix Riebl	Stolen Diamonds	2018	
"Reasonably Fine"	Felix Riebl	Cinema	2010	
"The Return"	Felix Riebl	B-side of "The Car Song"	2005	
"Rhyme and Reason" (Note: A studio recording was later released as a B-side to "Two Shoes" (2005))	Felix Riebl	The Sun	2002	
"The Rhythm"	Harry James Angus; Felix Riebl	The Sun	2002	
"Rising with the Sun"	Felix Riebl	Rising with the Sun	2016	
"Rock 'n' Roll" †	Felix Riebl; Richard Tedesco	Where the Angels Fall	2023	
"Saltwater"	Harry James Angus	Two Shoes	2005	
"Saturday Night"	Roscoe James Irwin; Ollie McGill; Felix Riebl	Stolen Diamonds	2019	
"The Scream" †	Felix Riebl	Non-album single	2021	
"Shoulders"	Harry James Angus; Will Hull-Brown; Ollie McGill; Ryan Monro; Felix Riebl	Cinema	2010	
"Side to Side"	Felix Riebl	Cities	2006	
"Siente"	Ollie McGill; Felix Riebl	Cities	2006	
"Sleep Won't Sleep"	Harry James Angus; Felix Riebl	Steal the Light	2013	
"Sly" †	Felix Riebl	Two Shoes	2005	
"So Long"	Felix Riebl	So Many Nights	2007	
"Sol y Sombra"	Harry James Angus; Ollie McGill; Ryan Monro; Felix Riebl	Two Shoes	2005	
"Sola" † (with Depedro)	Felix Riebl; Jairo Zavala	Stolen Diamonds	2018	
"So Many Nights" †	Felix Riebl	So Many Nights	2007	
"Som Foc" (with Txarango)	Jordi Barnola; Joaquim Canals; Sergi Carbonell; Pau Castellvi; Ivan Lopez; Alguer Miquel; Joan Palà; Pau Puig; Àlex Pujols ‡	El Cor de la Terra	2017	
"Song for Elias"	Felix Riebl	Cities	2006	
"Song for the Day" (Note: A studio recording was later released on Cities (2006))	Ollie McGill; Felix Riebl	The Sun	2002	
"Sparrow" †	Felix Riebl	Non-album single	2021	
"Steal the Light" †	Harry James Angus; Felix Riebl	Steal the Light	2013	
"Still Young"	Felix Riebl	Steal the Light	2013	
"Stolen Diamonds"	Harry James Angus	Stolen Diamonds	2018	
"Strong Coffee"	Felix Riebl	So Many Nights	2007	
"The Sun" (Note: A re-recorded version was later released on The Sun (2002))	Felix Riebl	Live @ Adelphia	2001	
"Sunny Afternoon" (The Kinks cover)	Ray Davies ‡	Triple J: Like a Version 5	2009	
"Sunny Moon"	Felix Riebl	So Many Nights	2007	
"Thunder Rumbles" †	Neda Rahmani; Felix Riebl	Where the Angels Fall	2023	
"Til The Ocean Takes Us All"	Harry James Angus; Felix Riebl	So Many Nights	2007	
"Two Shoes" †	Felix Riebl	The Sun	2002	
"Voodoo Cowboy"	Harry James Angus	So Many Nights	2007	
"Waiting"	Harry James Angus; Roscoe James Irwin; Felix Riebl	Cinema	2010	
"Walls"	Felix Riebl	Where the Angels Fall	2023	
"Waltz"	Felix Riebl	Cities	2006	
"Wandering" (Note: A studio recording was later released as a B-side to "Days Like These" (2004))	Felix Riebl	Live @ Adelphia	2001	
"Wanted to Write a Love Song"	Felix Riebl	The Sun	2002	
"West Sun"	Felix Riebl	Where the Angels Fall	2023	
"Who's That"	Felix Riebl	Stolen Diamonds	2019	
"Wild Animals"	Harry James Angus	Steal the Light	2013	
"The Wine Song"	Harry James Angus	The Cat Empire	2003	
"Wolves" †	Harry James Angus; Will Hull-Brown; Jamshid Khadiwala; Ollie McGill; Ryan Monro; Felix Riebl	Rising with the Sun	2015	
"Won't Be Afraid"	Harry James Angus; Will Hull-Brown; Ollie McGill; Ryan Monro; Felix Riebl	So Many Nights	2007	
"You Are My Song"	Harry James Angus; Will Hull-Brown; Jamshid Khadiwala; Ollie McGill; Ryan Monro; Felix Riebl	Rising with the Sun	2016	
"Zero" (with Anbessa Gebrehiwot)	Anbessa Gebrehiwot ‡	The Key of Sea	2010	
