= Where the Angels Fall =

2023 studio album by The Cat Empire

Studio album by the Cat Empire
- Released: 25 August 2023
- Recorded: 10 October – 21 November 2022
- Studios: Merri-bek City Band Room, Brunswick
- Genres: Latin; Afro-Cuban jazz; reggae; rock; flamenco
- Length: 51:38
- Label: Two Shoes
- Producers: Andy Baldwin; Felix Riebl; Ollie McGill; Roscoe James Irwin

The Cat Empire chronology
Stolen Diamonds (2019)	Where the Angels Fall (2023)	Bird in Paradise (2025)

Singles from Where the Angels Fall
- 1. "Thunder Rumbles" Released: 30 March 2023; 2. "Rock 'n' Roll" Released: 12 May 2023; 3. "Money Coming My Way" Released: 22 June 2023; 4. "Owl" Released: 4 August 2023

Where the Angels Fall is the ninth studio album by Australian band the Cat Empire, released on 25 August 2023 through Two Shoes Records. It was co-produced by Felix Riebl, Ollie McGill, Ross Irwin, and Andy Baldwin, who had previously worked on their self-titled debut in 2003. Recording took place from October to November 2022 at the Merri-bek City Band Room, a community music space in Brunswick, Victoria. It is the first album released by the band following the departure of original members Ryan Monro, Harry James Angus, Will Hull-Brown and Jamshid Khadiwala, and the first with new members Grace Barbé, Daniel Farrugia, Neda Rahmani and Lazaro Numa.

Musically, Where the Angels Fall contains elements of Latin music and Afro-Cuban jazz, as well as other genres. The album peaked at No. 5 on the ARIA Australian Artist Albums Chart, and produced four singles; "Thunder Rumbles", "Rock 'n' Roll", "Money Coming My Way" and "Owl". To promote the album, the band made several television appearances and a tour of Australia and North America. It was distributed digitally by Ditto Music, and on vinyl by Diggers Factory. Where the Angels Fall was released four and a half years after their previous album, Stolen Diamonds (2019).

== Background and recording ==
In March 2021, Monro, the group's original bassist, left the band. Hull-Brown, Angus and Khadiwala announced in September that they would also leave the band after a final set of shows, the last of which took place at the 2022 Byron Bay Bluesfest. Riebl and McGill stated that they would lead a new iteration of the group, with the intent of "taking the band forward into its next global chapter as a re-imagined, vibrant, cross-cultural, and joyful collective of musicians and artists." On 6 September 2022, the independent management company Lemon Tree Music announced that they would sign the Cat Empire.

The album was the first recorded with the band's newly altered lineup, the new members of which were announced on the group's social media platforms in late 2022. Daniel Farrugia, the band's new drummer, had been their touring drummer for several years, filling in for Will Hull-Brown before his eventual departure. Percussionist Neda Rahmani was a longtime friend of the band for many years before joining. She stated that the decision to join the group was a "logical move, and made creative sense to me – I didn't need to deliberate over it for a second". Grace Barbé toured with the band in Australia in 2019 before joining them. Jamie Searle, a member of her band, learnt on that tour that some of the original members were planning to leave the Cat Empire, and suggested that Barbé would be a good candidate for the role of bass player. Lazaro Numa joined The Empire Horns as a trumpeter based on trumpeter Roscoe James Irwin's recommendation, and none of the other members had met Numa in person before inviting him to join the band.

It is also the band's first release since The Cat Empire (2003) to be produced by Andy Baldwin. Recording of the album commenced on 10 October 2022, and concluded on 21 November 2022. in the Merri-bek City Band Room, a community music space in Brunswick, which was still under construction during recording. The current iteration of the hall, which has existed in various forms since 1882, was set up by Phil Noy, a friend of the band who had played saxophone on two of their previous albums. Riebl stated that the band was attempting to recapture the "roominess" of their previous recordings at EGREM Studios.

When we came to record the album, I wanted to think about the Cat Empire more as a community of musicians than just a like-for-like replacement of band members. [...] It was really important for us to treat every song like a world of its own, and so we brought in a lot of musicians to create and reflect that.

— Felix Riebl (2023)

The album features a more expansive production style than the band's prior releases. They took advantage of the larger recording space to book more musicians, and a total of 75 musicians and 49 instruments appear on the album. The band avoided double tracking during recording, instead choosing to bring in more players. They also developed their own custom-made samples for use on the album, rather than using existing ones. Some of them feature Barbé and Rahmani singing in their native tongues of Seychellois Creole and Portuguese, respectively. It is the band's first album since So Many Nights (2007) to feature a string section, although Steal the Light (2013) featured violinist Al Burkoy of Tinpan Orange.

== Composition and songs ==
"Owl"
Critics, along with the band themselves, noted "Owl" for its African influences and large orchestration.

Where the Angels Fall features an eclectic mixture of musical styles, including Latin music, Afro-Cuban jazz and reggae. The influence of Latin music is evident on tracks such as "Thunder Rumbles" and "Oh Mercy", while "Owl" and "Rock 'n' Roll" are influenced by flamenco. The album also includes the reggae-influenced cut "Walls", and the rock and roll song "Dance the Night Away".

"Thunder Rumbles" opens the album with a sousaphone riff, performed by Jay Scarlett. The album takes its title from a line in the song. The band described the lyrics as "a brawl of celebration", and the song as "high-octane from start to finish". The Horns of Leroy appear prominently on the track. "Boom Boom" was written about "a city of music reemerging," in the wake of the COVID-19 lockdowns of 2020 and 2021. It began as a vocal hook by Riebl, before more elements were added. Mohamed Camara and Boubacar Gaye, percussionists from Ausecuma Beats, appear on the song. "Money Coming My Way" was written about the cost of living. The Heidelberg Wind Ensemble, who happened to be rehearsing in the space while the band was recording, made a guest appearance on the song. Baldwin plays the role of the police officer in the song's bridge.

"Dance the Night Away" was written about Riebl's then six-year-old daughter Anya. The song "Owl" began life as a jam session between Riebl, McGill, and Richard and Johnny Tedesco, flamenco musicians and friends of the band. The group described it as "the most epic, expansive song on the album". "Be With You Again" was written by Riebl about the death of his younger brother Max, who died at the age of 30 from cancer. It features a Brazilian drumming section, conducted by Rahmani, and another appearance from the Heidelberg Wind Ensemble. It is Riebl's favourite track on the album. The album's final track, "Drift Away", is a duet between Riebl and Barbé, who sings a verse in Seychellois Creole. It was influenced by the album An Evening with Belafonte/Mouskouri.

== Release and promotion ==
On 4 August 2022, the band released the first teaser of their new music on their YouTube channel. Various teasers were released in the following months on their social media. A snippet of "Thunder Rumbles", the album's lead single, was released on 27 March 2023, and the full song was released three days later. The song premiered on Double J. It peaked at No. 1 on the AMRAP Metro Charts, remaining there for two weeks. The song's music video was directed by Nick Campbell and produced by Josh Harris. Giulia McGauran, who designed the album cover, provided creative direction for the video. Her work on the packaging inspired the video's visuals. It was filmed with a single camcorder, and inspired by music videos from the 1980s and 1990s.

On 12 May, the band revealed the album's release date and album cover, and "Rock 'n' Roll" was released as the second single. The song's release was accompanied by a lyric video, in which a pair of headphones travel through various pairs of hands. It was filmed on their 2023 tour of Europe and Australia. The song debuted at No. 1 on the AMRAP Metro Charts, and stayed in that position for two weeks.

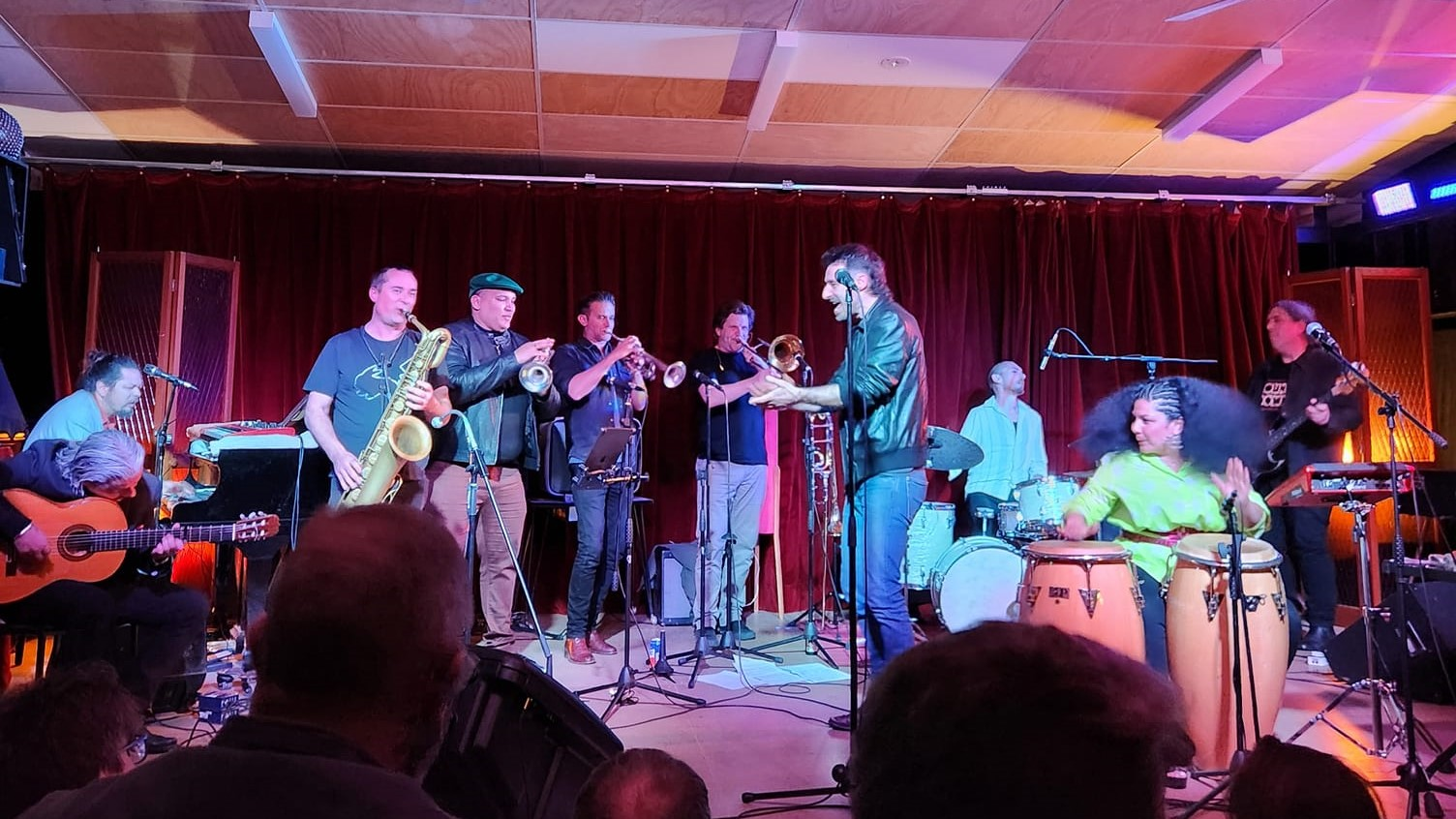
The Cat Empire at the Merri-bek City Band Room, celebrating the launch of Where the Angels Fall, 25 August 2023. From left to right: R. Tedesco, McGill, Noy, Numa, Irwin, Conrau, Riebl, Farrugia, Rahmani and Yuri Pavlinov.

"Money Coming My Way" was released as the album's third single on 22 June. The song's music video depicts the members of the band, dressed as employees, conducting a robbery of a grocery store. It was directed by Josh Harris. "I don't think we've ever had so much fun making a video clip," said Riebl of the filming. It peaked at No. 2 on the AMRAP Metro Charts, kept off the No. 1 position by "Lookin' Out" by King Stingray. The band announced a tour a month later. The final single from the album, "Owl", was released on 4 August. Riebl and McGill made a guest appearance on The Project on 23 August to discuss the album. On the day before the album's release, "Oh Mercy", "Walls" and "Drift Away" were released on the band's YouTube channel.

Where the Angels Fall was released on 25 August 2023. It was made available as a CD, LP and digital download. A music video for "Boom Boom", similar in style to the video for "Thunder Rumbles" and directed by Campbell, was also released on the day. A launch party was held at the Merri-bek City Band Room to mark the album's release. It peaked at No. 5 on the ARIA Australian Artist Albums Chart. From August to September, the band released a four-part documentary on Facebook documenting the album's recording process. Riebl, McGill and Rahmani guest programmed on Rage on 16 September. It was their second time guest programming on the show – they had previously hosted it in April 2004.

== Touring ==
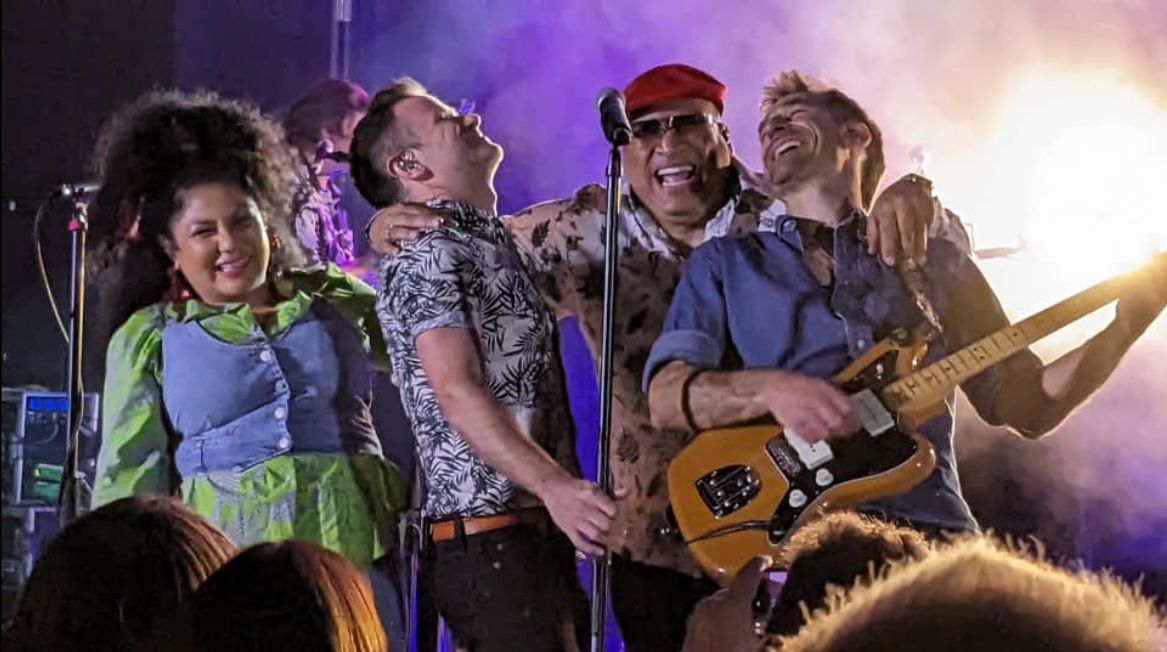
Rahmani, Irwin, Numa and Riebl performing live at the Greenfield Lake Amphitheater, 22 October 2023.

The band supported the album with a world tour of Australia and North America, which began in September 2023 with a show at the Enmore Theatre, in Sydney. The Australian leg of the tour consisted of six shows, the last of which took place at the Forum Theatre in Melbourne on 6 October. The Australian-New Zealand band Coterie supported the band on every show of the Australian leg. Singer-songwriter and guitarist Steph Strings supported them on every show except for the first, where Sri-Lankan born musician Roshani took her place.

They embarked on the North American leg of the tour on 18 October, with a show at the Ponte Vedra Concert Hall in Florida. After playing ten shows in the United States, they travelled to Canada, where they played four consecutive shows. They went back to the U.S. on 6 November for nine shows, before returning to Canada on 20 November, where they played four shows in a row. The final show of the tour, supported by singer-songwriter Marissa Mur, took place in Mexico City at the Auditorio BB on 26 November 2023. They were supported by the funk band High Fade on their shows in the United States. In December, they appeared at three music festivals in Australia.

== Critical reception ==
Professional ratings
Review scores
Source	Rating
Mondo Sonoro	7/10 stars

Where the Angels Fall received generally positive reviews from music critics. Orpheo stated that the album was "packed with [...] intimate and heartfelt moments that will leave listeners captivated from start to finish", and praised the album for capturing the essence of the band's live performances. Marta Terrasa of Mondo Sonoro said that the album "recovers the enthusiasm of their beginnings and adds all the baggage of an extensive career", and that "you'd have to live in the bowels of the earth not to succumb to the euphoric pulsations of the Cat Empire, if only for a little while". Un Disco Al Día's Fernando Neira dubbed the album "a genuine, efficient and effective display; a painkiller with a spirit as colourful as the cover", but wrote that the album became tiring on songs like "Coming Back Again", which they described as "rather showy and excessive".

== Track listing ==
All tracks are written by Felix Riebl, except where noted.

Where the Angels Fall track listing
No.	Title	Writer(s)	Length
1.	"Thunder Rumbles"	Felix Riebl; Neda Rahmani	2:55
2.	"Boom Boom"	Riebl; Ollie McGill; Roscoe James Irwin	3:05
3.	"Money Coming My Way"	Riebl; McGill; Irwin; Andy Baldwin	3:03
4.	"Deeper"	Riebl; McGill	3:23
5.	"Owl"	Riebl; McGill; Irwin; Richard Tedesco	5:16
6.	"Dance the Night Away"		3:49
7.	"Be With You Again"		4:34
8.	"Rock 'n' Roll"	Riebl; Tedesco	3:37
9.	"Coming Back Again"		4:11
10.	"West Sun"		3:07
11.	"Old Dog, New Trick"	Riebl; McGill; Irwin	3:23
12.	"Oh Mercy"	Riebl; Rahmani; Harry James Angus	4:51
13.	"Walls"		3:27
14.	"Drift Away"	Riebl; Grace Barbé	2:49
Total length:			51:38

== Personnel ==
Adapted from the liner notes.

The Cat Empire

- Felix Riebl – lead vocals, tres, percussion
- Ollie McGill – piano, organ, synths
- Grace Barbé – lead & backing vocals
- Neda Rahmani – percussion, backing vocals
- Lazaro Numa – trumpet, backing vocals
- Roscoe James Irwin – trumpet, backing vocals
- Kieran Conrau – trombone, backing vocals
- Danny Farrugia – drums, percussion
- Yuri Pavlinov – bass

Additional musicians

- Horns of Leroy – horns
  - Travis Woods – trumpet
  - Ben Harrison – trumpet
  - Chris Vizard – trombone
  - Nick Pietsch – trombone
  - Jay Scarlett – sousaphone
- Heidelberg Wind Ensemble – woodwinds (3, 7)
  - Stephen Carpenter – direction
- Mat Jodrell – trumpet
- Ben Gillespie – trombone
- Phil Noy – baritone saxophone
- Richard Tedesco – nylon string guitar, palmas
- Johnny Tedesco – cajón, palmas
- Mohamed Camara – West African percussion
- Boubacar Gaye – West African percussion
- Edval Santos – Brazilian percussion
- Mark Grunden – Brazilian percussion
- Frank Gionfriddo – shouts (1)
- Andy Baldwin – backing vocals, percussion
- Giulia Giannini McGauran – ocean drum, GG-phone
- Adrian "Tjupurru" Fabila - didjeribone

String musicians

- Cameron Jamieson
- Ioana Tache
- Madeleine Jevons
- Monica Curro
- Lynette Rayner
- Lisa Reynolds
- Ceridwen Davies
- Matt Laing
- Charlotte Jacke
- Kalina Krusteva

Technical personnel

- Andy Baldwin – production, mixing
- Felix Riebl – production
- Ollie McGill – production
- Roscoe James Irwin – production, horn and string arrangements, orchestration
- Lachlan Carrick – mastering
- Phil Noy – assistant engineer, lab services
- Giulia Giannini McGauran – artwork
- Sebi White – artwork design

== Charts ==
Weekly chart performance for Where the Angels Fall
Chart (2023)	Peak position
Australian Albums (ARIA)	5
