= Live at Martyrs' =

Live at Martyrs' may refer to:

- Live at Martyrs' (EP), a 2007 EP by The Cat Empire
- Live at Martyrs' (album), a 2000 album by Chris Whitley
