= The Sun (Cat Empire album) =

Studio album by The Cat Empire
- Released: 2002
- Recorded: June 2002
- Genre: Alternative rock
- Length: 57:33
- Label: Independent release
- Producer: The Cat Empire

The Cat Empire chronology
Demo/The Ct Empire (2000)	The Sun (2002)	Tapes, Breaks and Out-Takes (2003)

The Sun is an album by The Cat Empire recorded in June 2002, and is a follow-up to their album Live @ Adelphia.

The album was never released for retail sale but was sold at performances during their American tour and, as such, there are very few authentic copies of the album. According to Felix Riebl (vocals and percussion), he himself does not have a copy of the album: "To be honest, I know next to nothing about this album, but I know there are a lot of Cat Empire fans who want to know which songs the album has and that much, I do know."

Ryan Monro, The Cat Empire's bassist, claims to own one or two copies of the album.

Many tracks from the album have been re-recorded and released on later recordings.

- "The Rhythm", "The Chariot", "The Crowd", and "Hello" were re-recorded and included in their official self-titled debut album.
- "Wanted to Write a Love Song" was a b-side on their second single from the self-titled era, Days Like These.
- "Two Shoes" and "The Night That Never End" were both re-recorded and released on their second album, Two Shoes.
- Different versions of "The Mother Place" and "Rhyme and Reason" can also be found as b-sides on singles from the Two Shoes era.
- "Song For the Day" was re-recorded for their third album Cities.
- The iTunes 'exclusive bonus track' release of So Many Nights includes the original "Rhyme and Reason" as track 15, adding '(Demo)' after the track name.
- "The Chariot" and "Two Shoes" were both released in their original form on Tapes, Breaks and Out-Takes.

With the inclusion of the track "The Sun" on the On The Attack bonus CD, the collection can almost be pieced together from other albums.

Copies of the album have been bootlegged on the online auction site eBay, being sold for many times its original value. A signed copy was sold for $900 in 2008, and in 2009 a copy was sold for $260. In the past there have been copies go for as high as $450. Most recently on eBay Australia there was a genuine release that sold for over $170.

== Track listing ==
All tracks are written by Felix Riebl, unless otherwise indicated

No.	Title	Writer(s)	Length
1.	"The Mother Place"		3:19
2.	"The Rhythm"		4:18
3.	"Rhyme and Reason"		5:14
4.	"The Chariot"		5:27
5.	"The Crowd"	Harry Angus	5:27
6.	"Two Shoes"		5:31
7.	"Wanted to Write a Love Song"		6:49
8.	"Song for the Day"		4:48
9.	"The Night That Never Ends"		4:38
10.	"Hello"		5:07
11.	"The Sun"		6:55
Total length:			57:33

== 'Sampler' promo ==
A four track promotional disc simply titled Sampler was also released in 2002. It contains four tracks from The Sun, and a foldout booklet with information such as highlights, history and the band 'mission'. The front cover contains the trademark genre description:

Where hip-hop meets reggae, where jazz is played with dirty hands, where a Cuban line meets an Aussie rule, where nothing seems in place but sounds like many places played in one earthy chord.... this is the island where The Cat Empire was born: sounds from no man's land.

The disc artwork is a greyscale version of The Sun, with 'The Sun' being replaced by the word 'Sampler' on the disc. The front cover does not include an album name, yet simply has "100% Australian Made" in place of the words 'The Sun'. The back cover is the same as The Sun, featuring the members of the band, but with no track list. Again, it is in greyscale.

Sampler (2002)

All tracks are written by Felix Riebl, unless otherwise indicated

No.	Title	Writer(s)	Length
1.	"Hello"		5:07
2.	"The Mother Place"		3:19
3.	"The Crowd"	Angus	5:27
4.	"Wanted to Write a Love Song"		6:49
Total length:			20:42
