= Stolen Diamonds =

Studio album by the Cat Empire
- Released: 15 February 2019
- Studio: Red Moon Studios
- Length: 53:53
- Label: Two Shoes
- Producer: Jan Skubiszewski

The Cat Empire chronology
| Rising with the Sun (2016) | Stolen Diamonds (2019) | Where the Angels Fall (2023) |

Singles from Stolen Diamonds
- 1. "Ready Now" Released: 1 July 2018; 2. "Stolen Diamonds" Released: 1 August 2018; 3. "La Sirène" Released: 1 September 2018; 4. "Kila" Released: 1 October 2018; 5. "Sola" Released: 1 November 2018; 6. "Barricades" Released: 1 December 2018; 7. "Oscar Wilde" Released: 31 December 2018; 8. "Echoes" Released: 8 February 2019

Stolen Diamonds is the eighth studio album by Melbourne band the Cat Empire. It was produced by Jan Skubiszewski and released on 15 February 2019 through Two Shoes Records. The album was released almost three years after their previous album, Rising with the Sun (2016) - the band's longest gap between albums at that time. It debuted at Number 4 on the Australian ARIA Albums Chart, making it the band's sixth top 10 debut, following Rising with the Sun. To promote the album, the band released a new single on the first of each month leading up to the release, starting with "Ready Now" on 1 July 2018. Next released was "Stolen Diamonds" in August, followed by "La Sirène" in September, "Kila" in October, "Sola" in November, "Barricades" in December, "Oscar Wilde" in January and "Echoes" in February.

It is the band's last album to feature the full original lineup, with Ryan Monro leaving in 2021 and Harry James Angus, Will Hull-Brown and Jamshid Khadiwhala all departing in 2022.

== Artwork ==
The artwork for Stolen Diamonds is a photo taken by Jason Futrill (also known as Tassiegrammer), taken at the Bay of Fires in Tasmania. The photo is entitled Floating Girl, and the subject of the picture is Futrill's then-partner Susan Matthew. On the day of the shoot, the temperature was below 12 °C (53.6 °F). Futrill stated that "at the time of capturing this image, drones had not yet become mainstream, and the unique perspective of the aerial image, combined with the colours and focal point of Susan in a bikini, helped create an image that has people dreaming that they were there."

== Reception ==
Melbourne magazine Beat rated the album 7 out of 10, stating: "The album barely takes a break from its upbeat tempo, and flows seamlessly between funk, reggae, and ska...". They went on to say that the album "...sees the Cat Empire take one step closer towards legend status."

Double J presented Stolen Diamonds as its feature album, and was also very positive in its review, saying: "The worst thing about Stolen Diamonds is that you’re gonna need to clear some space around you if you're planning on listening to it. Because this is very much a record that inspires movement."

While giving the album 3 out of 5 stars, The Sydney Morning Herald gave a more critical review, writing: "...the moves are there, the playing is very fine, but nothing lasts once you've stopped moving."

== Track listing ==
| No. | Title | Writer(s) | Length |
|---|---|---|---|
| 1. | "Kila" | Felix Riebl | 3:48 |
| 2. | "Stolen Diamonds" | Harry Angus | 4:23 |
| 3. | "Oscar Wilde" | Riebl; Angus | 3:46 |
| 4. | "Ready Now" | Riebl | 3:15 |
| 5. | "Barricades" | Angus; Jan Skubiszewski; Oliver McGill | 5:18 |
| 6. | "Anybody" | Riebl; Angus | 4:31 |
| 7. | "La Sirène" (featuring Eloise Mignon) | Riebl; Eloise Mignon; McGill | 3:18 |
| 8. | "Echoes" | Angus | 4:33 |
| 9. | "Who's That" | Riebl | 3:18 |
| 10. | "Adelphia" | Angus | 5:49 |
| 11. | "Saturday Night" | Riebl; McGill; Ross Irwin | 4:41 |
| 12. | "Bow Down to Love" | Angus | 3:50 |
| 13. | "Sola" (featuring Depredo) | Riebl; Jairo Zavala | 3:23 |
| Total length: | | | 53:53 |

== Personnel ==
The Cat Empire core members

- Harry James Angus – vocals, trumpet
- Will Hull-Brown – drums, percussion
- Jamshid Khadiwhala – turntables, percussion
- Ollie McGill – piano, organ, backing vocals
- Ryan Monro – bass guitar
- Felix Riebl – lead vocals, percussion

The Empire Horns (auxiliary members)

- Kieran Conrau – trombone, backing vocals
- Ross Irwin – trumpet, backing vocals
- Phil Noy – baritone saxophone

Additional musicians

- Eloise Mignon – vocals (track 7)
- Depedro – vocals (track 13)

Recording details

- Produced by – Jan Skubiszewski
- Mixing – Jan Skubiszewski
- Engineering – Jan Skubiszewski
- Mastered by – Adam Ayan
- Studio – Red Moon Studios (engineering, mixing); Gateway Mastering (mastering)

== Charts ==
=== Weekly charts ===
| Chart (2019) | Peak position |
|---|---|
| Australian Albums (ARIA) | 4 |

=== Year-end charts ===
| Chart (2019) | Position |
|---|---|
| Australian Jazz and Blues Albums (ARIA) | 1 |

| Chart (2020) | Position |
|---|---|
| Australian Jazz and Blues Albums (ARIA) | 30 |

| Chart (2021) | Position |
|---|---|
| Australian Jazz and Blues Albums (ARIA) | 30 |
