= Little Stories =

Studio album by Harry James Angus
- Released: 2011
- Genre: Acoustic, folk
- Length: 46:02

Harry James Angus chronology
"Live at the Famous Spiegeltent" (2008)	Little Stories (2011)

Little Stories is the second solo album from Melbourne singer / songwriter, Harry James Angus. It was released on September 16, 2011, and consists of eleven studio-recorded tracks, six of which also featured on his previous live album, Live at the Famous Spiegeltent.

The album is predominantly of a folk genre, and is described on Angus' official website as "constantly unfolding stories of buried bones, murderous stove cooks, sentimental corporate bankers and mystical cricket players."

Little Stories was recorded and mixed by Ross Cockle at Allan Eaton Studios on July 13 and 14 2011.

== Track listing ==
1. "Daddy's Millions" – 3:34
2. "The Batsman" – 3:46
3. "My Boring Life" – 4:24
4. "While You're Still Sleeping" – 4:01
5. "The Banker" – 3:47
6. "The Stovecook and the Waitress" – 3:30
7. "Matty & Josie" – 4:47
8. "Underground" – 7:12
9. "The River Queen" – 3:07
10. "In The Smallest Hours" – 4:10
11. "Singapore" – 3:47

== Personnel ==
- Harry James Angus - vocals, guitar
- Jules Pascoe - double bass
- Rory Macdougall - drums
