= Steal the Light =

Studio album by the Cat Empire
- Released: 17 May 2013
- Recorded: 2012
- Studio: Way of the Eagle Studios
- Genre: Alternative
- Length: 47:09
- Labels: Two Shoes; Inertia
- Producer: Jan Skubiszewski

The Cat Empire chronology
Cinema (2010)	Steal the Light (2013)	Rising with the Sun (2016)

Singles from Steal the Light
- 1. "Brighter Than Gold" Released: 22 February 2013; 2. "Steal the Light" Released: 9 May 2013

Steal the Light is the sixth studio album by Australian band the Cat Empire, released on 17 May 2013, through Inertia Records and Two Shoes Records. It is the band's first release under an independent label, and their first in a series of three albums by the band that were produced by Jan Skubiszewski. It was released more than two years and 10 months after their previous album, Cinema (2010) – the band's longest gap between albums at the time. It entered and peaked at No. 3 on the ARIA Albums Chart. Lead single "Brighter Than Gold" was released on 22 February 2013 to commercial success, placing at number 89 in the Triple J Hottest 100, 2013. Another single, "Steal the Light", was released on 9 May 2013.

== Background and recording ==
Felix Riebl wrote most of Steal the Light in a two-star lodge in Athens, while the anti-austerity riots of 2011 were taking place. He said that the album was written as a return "to an energy that is present on our earlier albums". Unlike the band's previous album, Cinema, which was "about the band going through some shit", Steal the Light was written to be "more about dancing and the energy that our fans know us for". The band announced in July 2012 that they were rehearsing for the album.

== Artwork ==
The cover art of the album is the work of Graeme Base, a longtime fan of the band, who convinced the band to lift their 12-year ban on cat references in album art. The choice of Base to design the album art came about when the band were discussing art direction for the record, and Angus suggested using Base's book Animalia as a visual reference. The band decided that they would instead "just call him up and see if he [would] do it". Speaking about his meeting with the band, Base said that he "sat down in the studio with the guys from the Cat Empire and listened to some tracks. We spoke about jungles and ancient civilizations and impossibly impractical instruments...and I tried to keep the grin off my face."

== Critical reception ==
Professional ratings
Review scores
Source	Rating
Clash	8/10 stars
AAA Music	5/5 stars
The Australian	4/5 stars
Daily Express	2/5 stars

Steal the Light received generally positive reviews from music critics. Cai Trefor of Clash called the "pluralist approach" to the album "truly uplifting and original". They concluded the review by stating that the "loose, energetic and rhythmic compositions [on the album would] change shape through improvisation live, but in the way they’re captured on Steal The Light, they are thoroughly enjoyable." Penny Black Music's Dave Goodwin dubbed the album "infectious catchy", and a "little gem", and said that "if you like your music uplifting, funky, ska'd up to the max and different, [...] this is for you." Tom Noyes of The Music described the album as an "audio holiday", and said that "Steal The Light shows that even after a decade in the game, the Cat Empire have still got it." Rachael Pilkington from AAA Music stated that "every song is perfectly crafted and sits seamlessly together, despite sounding so different".

Julia LeConte of Now said that "no one song is earth-shatteringly memorable, but Steal The Light was recorded to be played at outdoor grassy festivals with the intent of getting people up on their bare feet. At this it succeeds." Sarah Elks from The Australian described the sound of the record as a "wild mash-up of styles and sounds, but the listener is left energised rather than motion sick", and called the album "fun and frenetic". The Daily Express reacted less positively to the album, stating that the "curious mix of complicated rock, reggae and jazz espoused by this Melbourne-based sextet is oddly unsatisfying." Witchdoctor reacted even more negatively to the release, calling the Cat Empire "musical tourists without an original idea in their heads who have let fundamentally dull songwriters rule the roost", and "a band without a centre, except for a singer/songwriter who comes up with the most embarrassing cod-philosophies."

== Track listing ==
No.	Title	Writer(s)	Length
1.	"Brighter Than Gold"	Felix Riebl; Harry Angus	3:20
2.	"Prophets in the Sky"	Angus; Riebl; Ollie McGill; Ryan Monro; Will Hull-Brown; Jamshid Khadiwala	3:48
3.	"Steal The Light"	Riebl; Angus	3:45
4.	"Am I Wrong"	Angus; Riebl; Khadiwala	3:01
5.	"Wild Animals"	Angus	4:02
6.	"Still Young"	Riebl	4:18
7.	"Like A Drum"	Riebl; Monro; Khadiwala	4:39
8.	"Open Up Your Face"	Angus	4:24
9.	"Go"	Angus; Jan Skubiszewski	3:25
10.	"Sleep Won't Sleep"	Riebl; Angus	4:43
11.	"Don't Throw Your Hands Up"	Angus	4:08
12.	"All Night Loud"	Riebl	3:31
Total length:			47:09

== Personnel ==
The Cat Empire core members

- Harry James Angus – vocals, trumpet
- Will Hull-Brown – drums, percussion
- Jamshid Khadiwhala – turntables, percussion
- Ollie McGill – piano, organ, backing vocals
- Ryan Monro – bass guitar
- Felix Riebl – lead vocals, percussion

The Empire Horns (auxiliary members)

- Kieran Conrau – trombone, backing vocals
- Ross Irwin – trumpet, backing vocals

Additional musicians

- Rose Paez – backing vocals (tracks 4, 7)
- Al Burkoy – violin (tracks 4, 8)
- Luis Poblete – backing vocals (track 10), bongos (track 10), bell (track 10)

Recording details

- Produced by – Jan Skubiszewski
- Mixing – Jan Skubiszewski
- Engineering – Jan Skubiszewski
  - Assistant engineering – Michael O'Connell
- Mastered by – Geoff Pesche
- Studio – Way of the Eagle Studios (engineering, mixing); Abbey Road (mastering)

== Charts ==
Chart (2013)	Peak position
Australian Albums (ARIA)	3
Dutch Albums (Album Top 100)	88
