= Rising with the Sun =

Studio album by the Cat Empire
- Released: 4 March 2016
- Recorded: 2015
- Studio: Way of the Eagle Studios
- Length: 42:56
- Label: Two Shoes
- Producer: Jan Skubiszewski

The Cat Empire chronology
Steal the Light (2013)	Rising with the Sun (2016)	Stolen Diamonds (2019)

Singles from Rising with the Sun
- 1. "Qué Será Ahora" Released: 9 June 2015; 2. "Wolves" Released: 9 October 2015; 3. "Bulls" Released: 5 February 2016

Rising with the Sun is the seventh studio album by Melbourne band the Cat Empire. It was produced by Jan Skubiszewski and released on 4 March 2016 through Two Shoes Records. The first single was "Qué Será Ahora", followed by "Wolves" and "Bulls". "Wolves" placed at number 79 in the Triple J Hottest 100, 2015. It debuted at number one on the Australian ARIA Albums Chart, the band's second number-one debut, the first being Two Shoes (2005).

== Reception ==
Rolling Stone Australia awarded the album four out of five stars, saying that Rising with the Sun was a "remarkably intercontinental affair." The magazine praised the new album, calling it "an ebullient celebration sans frontiers." Double J was also positive in its review, writing "The Cat Empire administer another dose of fun, diverse music on album number seven."

== Track listing ==
All tracks are written by Felix Riebl, unless otherwise indicated

No.	Title	Writer(s)	Length
1.	"Wolves"	Felix Riebl; Harry Angus; Will Hull-Brown; Ryan Monro; Oliver McGill; Jamshid Khadiwala	3:23
2.	"Bulls"		3:26
3.	"Midnight"	Angus	4:22
4.	"Blasting Away"		3:49
5.	"You Are My Song"	Angus; Riebl; Hull-Brown; Monro; McGill; Khadiwala	3:49
6.	"Eagle"	Angus; Riebl; Hull-Brown; Monro; McGill; Khadiwala	3:32
7.	"Bataclan"		4:37
8.	"Rising with the Sun"		3:45
9.	"Daggers Drawn"	Angus	5:34
10.	"Qué Será Ahora"	Riebl; Angus	3:41
11.	"Creature"	Riebl; Angus	2:58
Total length:			42:56

Pre-order bonus tracks (digital download)
No.	Title	Writer(s)	Length
1.	"Lover Lover Lover"	Leonard Cohen	3:53
2.	"Flags"		3:13
Total length:			7:06

== Personnel ==
The Cat Empire core members

- Harry James Angus – vocals, trumpet
- Will Hull-Brown – drums, percussion
- Jamshid Khadiwhala – turntables, percussion
- Ollie McGill – piano, organ, backing vocals
- Ryan Monro – bass guitar
- Felix Riebl – lead vocals, percussion

The Empire Horns (auxiliary members)

- Kieran Conrau – trombone, backing vocals
- Ross Irwin – trumpet, backing vocals

Additional musicians

- Emily Lubitz – backing vocals (track 3)

Recording details

- Produced by – Jan Skubiszewski
- Mixing – Jan Skubiszewski
- Engineering – Jan Skubiszewski
- Mastered by – Joe La Porta
- Studio – Way of the Eagle Studios (engineering, mixing); Sterling Sound (mastering)

== Charts ==
=== Weekly charts ===
Weekly chart performance for Rising with the Sun
Chart (2016)	Peak position
Australian Albums (ARIA)	1
Swiss Albums (Schweizer Hitparade)	51

=== Year-end charts ===
Year-end chart performance for Rising with the Sun
Chart (2016)	Position
Australian Albums (ARIA)	82
