= On the Attack =

Live album by The Cat Empire
- Released: 2004
- Recorded: March – April, 2004
- Genre: Ska/Jazz
- Length: 59 minutes

The Cat Empire chronology
Live @ Adelphia (2001)	On the Attack (2004)	Live on Earth (2009)

On the Attack is a DVD of live recordings and videos of Australian band, The Cat Empire. The package also contains an eight track bonus compact disc.

The concert filming took place between March and June, 2004 and the presentation introduces the band members as it follows them on tour. The bonus disc contains the track The Sun, released on both "The Sun" and "Live @ Adelphia". It also includes a recording of Days Like These, from Bennetts Lane Jazz Club in Melbourne, Australia on 17 May 2004, and a cover of the Eagles' "Hotel California" sung by Harry James Angus in French for Australian alternative radio station Triple J for their segment 'Like a Version'.

== DVD Track Listing ==
DVD Set list

1. "Intro"
2. "How to Explain?"
3. "Nothing"
4. "Days Like These
5. "The Rhythm"
6. "The Crowd"
7. "Hello"
8. "The Lost Song"
9. "The Chariot"

DVD Encore

1. "L'Hotel de Californie"
2. The Cat Empire Dancers
3. The Happy Sideshow Sword Swallower
4. More In The Cage
5. "Two Shoes" (UK Tour 2002)
6. "The Sun" (US Tour 2002)
7. Extreme Merch
8. Fusion Song ("(Con)fusion")
9. Pop-up Commentary

== Bonus CD Track Listing ==
All tracks are written by Felix Riebl, unless otherwise indicated

No.	Title	Writer(s)	Length
1.	"Intro"		5:02
2.	"How to Explain?"		10:57
3.	"The Crowd"	Harry Angus	7:38
4.	"The Rhythm"	Felix Riebl, Angus	11:19
5.	"The Lost Song"		5:35
6.	"The Sun"		6:55
7.	"L'Hotel de Californie"	Don Felder, Don Henley, Glenn Frey	4:40
8.	"Days Like These"	Riebl, Angus, Ollie McGill	7:17
Total length:			59:23

== Certifications ==
Region	Certification	Certified units/sales
Australia (ARIA)	Gold	7,500^{^}
^{^} Shipments figures based on certification alone.
