= Cinema (The Cat Empire album) =

Studio album by the Cat Empire
- Released: 25 June 2010
- Recorded: February–March 2010, Sing Sing Studios, Melbourne
- Genre: Alternative rock; jazz; blues; pop; ska
- Length: 42:08
- Label: EMI
- Producer: Steve Schram; The Cat Empire

The Cat Empire chronology
So Many Nights (2007)	Cinema (2010)	Steal the Light (2013)

Singles from Cinema
- 1. "Feeling's Gone" Released: 14 May 2010; 2. "On My Way" Released: 15 June 2010

Cinema is the fifth studio album of eclectic Australian band, the Cat Empire. It was released in Australia on 25 June 2010 by EMI and débuted at No. 3 on the ARIA Albums Chart. It was released more than two years and nine months after their previous album, So Many Nights (2007) - the longest gap between albums releases by the band at that time. The work was co-produced by Steve Schram with the group.

== Background ==
The Cat Empire's fifth studio album, Cinema, was issued on 25 June 2010 by EMI in Australia. It was followed by releases in Canada, United States, and then Europe. It was co-produced by Steve Schram and the group. According to the band's lead vocalist and percussionist, [Felix Riebl], its title was due to the content, which "is very cinematic, simply put ... Another way to describe it is that it is like a soundtrack to a movie that we might make one day. When [Schram] and I were sitting around and trying to come up with a title we thought that the name we eventually chose would suit the atmosphere".

Cinema débuted at number three on the ARIA Albums Chart. The track, "Beyond All", was featured on national radio station, Triple J's New Music with Richard Kingsmill in April. The lead single, "Feeling's Gone", had been released in May ahead of the album. A promotional copy of Cinema had been leaked to eBay about three weeks before its due date and sold for $200; EMI provided a statement regarding the leak. To promote the album the group undertook a tour on North America in July followed by a national tour in August and September.

== Track listing ==
No.	Title	Writer(s)	Length
1.	"Waiting"	Harry Angus; Ross Irwin; Felix Riebl	3:08
2.	"Falling"	Angus; Irwin; Ollie McGill; Riebl	4:09
3.	"Feeling's Gone"	Angus; McGill; Ryan Monro; Riebl; Steve Schram	2:33
4.	"Only Light"	Angus; Irwin; McGill; Monro; Giorgio Moroder (uncredited)	4:38
5.	"All Hell"	Angus; Riebl	3:05
6.	"Shoulders"	Angus; Will Hull-Brown; McGill; Monro; Riebl	5:05
7.	"The Heart Is a Cannibal"	Angus; McGill	4:05
8.	"Reasonably Fine"	Riebl	3:59
9.	"Call Me Home"	Riebl; Irwin	4:05
10.	"On My Way"	Angus; Hull-Brown; McGill; Monro; Riebl	3:17
11.	"Beyond All"	Angus; Hull-Brown; Jamshid Khadiwala; McGill; Monro; Riebl	4:09
Total length:			42:08

== Personnel ==
The Cat Empire core members

- Harry James Angus – vocals, trumpet
- Will Hull-Brown – drums
- Jamshid Khadiwhala – turntables, hand percussion
- Ollie McGill – piano, keyboards
- Ryan Monro – bass guitar
- Felix Riebl – lead vocals, congas, percussion, piano

The Empire Horns (auxiliary members)

- Kieran Conrau – trombone
- Ross Irwin – trumpet
- Phil Noy – baritone saxophone (tracks 3, 7, 9), soprano saxophone (track 5)

Recording details

- Produced by – Steve Schram, The Cat Empire
- Mixing – Steve Schram
- Engineering – Steve Schram
  - Assistant engineering – Gareth "Grif" Burnell, Anna Webster, Mick Rafferty
- Mastered by – Ross Cockle
- Studio – Sing Sing Studios (engineering, mastering); Bangkok Ninja Academy (mixing)

== Charts ==
Chart (2010)	Peak position
Australian Albums (ARIA)	3
