= The Conglomerate (Australian group) =

Australian jazz quartet

- Origin: Melbourne, Victoria, Australia
- Genre: Jazz
- Years active: 2004–present
- Label: Conglomerate/MGM
- Spinoff of: The Cat Empire
- Members: Harry Angus; Ollie McGill; Jules Pascoe; Harry Shaw-Reynolds
- Website: theconglomerate.com.au

The Conglomerate are an Australian jazz quartet formed in 2004 as a side project by Harry Angus on trumpet and vocals; and Ollie McGill on piano. At the time, both were also members of ska, jazz band, the Cat Empire. The pair were joined in the Conglomerate by Jules Pascoe on double bass and Harry Shaw-Reynolds on drums.

The group released an independent album, Go to the Beach (5 September 2005), distributed by MGM. It was recorded at Sing Sing Studios, Melbourne. John Shand of The Sydney Morning Herald described their work as providing, "loose, rambunctious, celebratory excitement."

The Conglomerate's second album, Hold Your Breath, was released on 28 March 2008.

== Discography ==
=== Albums ===
- Go to the Beach (5 September 2005) Conglomerate/MGM Distribution (Conglomerate001)
- Hold Your Breath (28 March 2008)
