= Max Riebl =

Australian countertenor (1991–2022)

Max Riebl (26 June 1991 – 30 April 2022) was an Australian countertenor.

== Biography ==
Riebl was born in Melbourne, the younger brother of Felix Riebl.

He attended Melbourne Grammar School before moving to Austria for middle school at the Musikgymnasium Wien (Music Gymnasium Vienna), singing in the Hofburg Chapel Choir and the Clemencic Consort. He studied baroque performance in Switzerland at the Schola Cantorum Basiliensis. He lived in Switzerland, France, and Austria, working with Gerd Türk, Jörg-Andreas Bötticher and Andrea Marcon before returning to Australia.

He was a prize winner and finalist at many international musical competitions such as the Royal Melbourne Philharmonic Arias, the Chicago Classical Singer, the London Handel Competition, and the 2015 Australian Singing Competition.

Career highlights included performances at the Vienna Concert House, Musikverein, and the Royal Albert Hall. He also performed with Pinchgut Opera and the Australian Brandenburg Orchestra.

Riebl sang and played trumpet on the song "Miserere" on The Cat Empire's second album Two Shoes.

He died on 30 April 2022 at the age of 30 from incurable cancer.
