= Harry James Angus =

Australian singer-songwriter, trumpet player and guitarist

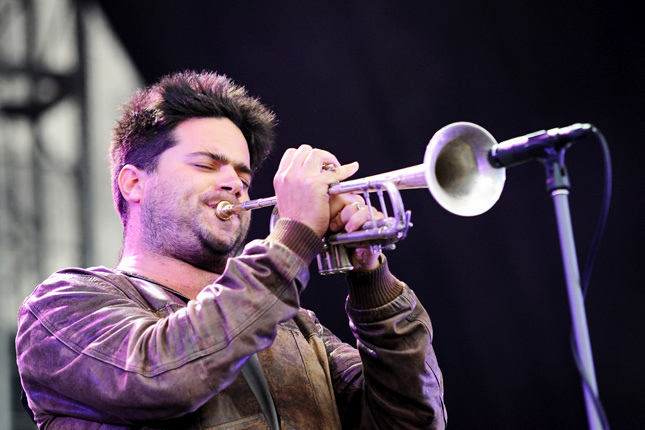
- Angus performing at the West Coast Blues & Roots Festival in 2011

Background information
- Born: 11 June 1982 (age 43); Melbourne, Victoria, Australia
- Genres: Jazz, folk, rock, alternative
- Occupations: Singer-songwriter, musician
- Instruments: Trumpet, guitar, vocals
- Years active: 2000–present
- Label: EMI
- Spouse: Emily Lubitz

Harry James Angus (born 11 June 1982) is an Australian singer-songwriter, trumpet player and guitarist. He was one of the lead vocalists in the Melbourne band The Cat Empire along with Felix Riebl. He joined the group in early 2000 and left when the original line-up disbanded in 2021.

== Early life ==
Angus was born on 11 June 1982 in Melbourne, Victoria. He has been playing the trumpet since the age of twelve and learned to scat from listening to the Jazz greats. He went to primary school at Malvern Primary School, where he would often perform as a vocalist at school assemblies. He then went to high school at McKinnon Secondary College and was taught by Ian Orr in Melbourne before studying at the Victorian College of the Arts.

He also is the nephew of comedian, actress and writer, Mary-Anne Fahey (who played Kylie Mole on The Comedy Company).

== Career ==
=== Jackson Jackson ===
His current side project, Jackson Jackson, is a partnership with producer and film composer Jan Skubiszewski (Two Hands, The Rage in Placid Lake, Last Man Standing). "Jackson Jackson and the New Apocalypso Beat" features Melbourne trio "The Genie" (composed of Ollie McGill on keyboards and keytar, Ryan Monro on bass and Will Hull-Brown on drums). His backing singers are known as "The Jackson Jackson 5" (comprising Elana Stone, Karishma Sadhai, Bec Ari, Chantal Mitvalsky and Rory Osman). Jackson Jackson are signed to EMI and their debut album The Fire Is on the Bird was released in March 2007.

Jackson Jackson played shows in Melbourne, Sydney and Brisbane in mid-March 2007 as part of their "Sneak Preview" tour.

In 2008, they released their second album Tools for Survival.

=== Other projects ===
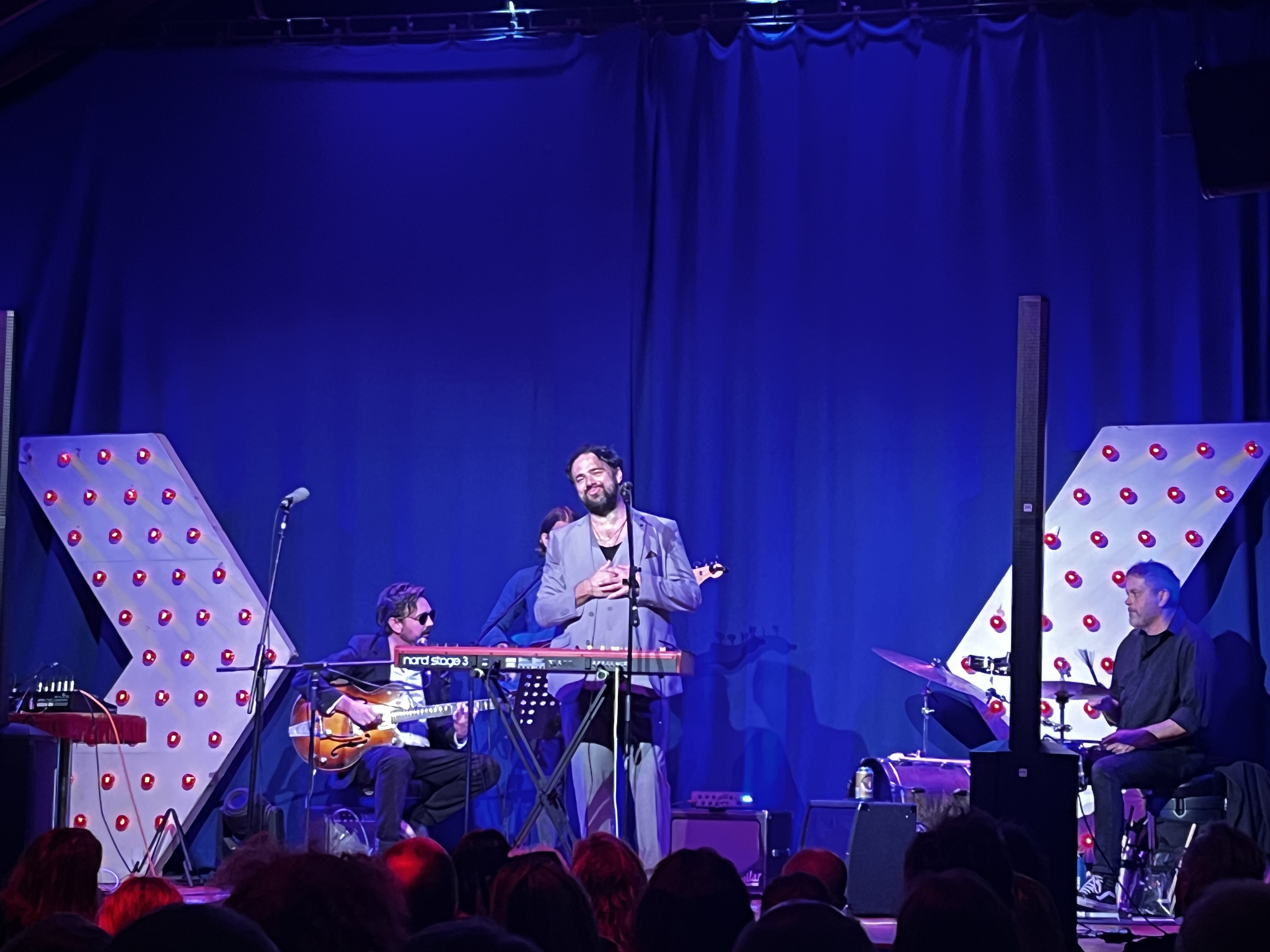
Angus performing in 'Gospel Sunday' at the Brunswick Picture House, July 2025

Angus is a member of The Conglomerate, and plays trumpet on four tracks of the debut album Aroona Palace by Tinpan Orange, which also features Ollie McGill.

He has also released two folk/acoustic solo albums, Live at the Famous Spiegeltent in 2008, and Little Stories in 2011.

In 2012, Angus wrote the Russian Folk Dance-inspired club song for the newest club in the AFL, the Greater Western Sydney Giants.

In 2025 Angus began leading 'Gospel Sunday' events where, backed by a band, he leads singalongs of gospel-influenced, secular tones with a number of the events being run at the Brunswick Picture House in Brunswick Heads.

== Other appearances ==
In 2006, Angus appeared twice as a panelist on the ABC Australian Music Quiz show Spicks and Specks. Angus is also part of The Conglomerate, a four-piece Melbourne jazz band. He also played basketball for the Malvern Tigers Basketball Club, and used to wear the club's black and yellow singlet while performing at gigs. He is married to Emily Lubitz, the lead singer of Tinpan Orange and they live together in the Northern Rivers region.

== Awards and nominations ==
=== National Live Music Awards ===
The National Live Music Awards (NLMAs) are a broad recognition of Australia's diverse live industry, celebrating the success of the Australian live scene. The awards commenced in 2016.

Year	Nominee / work	Award	Result
National Live Music Awards of 2018	Harry James Angus	Best Live Voice of the Year - People's Choice	Won

== Discography ==
=== Solo albums ===
- Live at the Famous Spiegeltent (2008)
- Little Stories (2011)
- Struggle With Glory (2018)

=== The Cat Empire ===
Studio albums

- The Cat Empire (2003)
- Two Shoes (2005)
- Cities: The Cat Empire Project (2006)
- So Many Nights (2007)
- Cinema (2010)
- Steal the Light (2013)
- Rising with the Sun (2016)
- Stolen Diamonds (2019)

=== Jackson Jackson ===
- The Fire Is on the Bird (2007)
- Tools For Survival (2008)

=== The Conglomerate ===
- Go to the Beach (2005)
- Hold Your Breath (2008)

=== With Tinpan Orange ===
- Aroona Palace (2005)
- The Bottom of the Lake (2009) (producer, also plays harmonium, piano, whistles, keyboard, percussion, guitar)

== See also ==
- The Cat Empire
