= So Many Nights (song) =

Single by The Cat Empire

from the album So Many Nights
- B-side: "Dumb Things"
- Released: December 8, 2007
- Recorded: 2007
- Genre: Alternative
- Length: 3:35
- Label: EMI/Virgin
- Songwriter(s): Felix Riebl

The Cat Empire singles chronology
"No Longer There" (2007)	"So Many Nights" (2007)	"Fishies" (2008)

"So Many Nights" is the title track from The Cat Empire's 2007 album of the same name. It was the second single released from the album and was released as an EP on the iTunes Store. The second track from the EP is a cover, taken from the Paul Kelly album, Under the Sun.

"So Many Nights" was ranked number 50 in the Triple J Hottest 100 of 2007.

== Track listing ==
All tracks are written by Felix Riebl, unless otherwise indicated

iTunes EP release
No.	Title	Writer(s)	Length
1.	"So Many Nights"		3:35
2.	"Dumb Things"	Paul Kelly	3:52
3.	"So Many Nights" (with the Australian Youth Orchestra)		4:37
Total length:			12:04
