= Ryan Monro =

Australian bassist (born 1981)

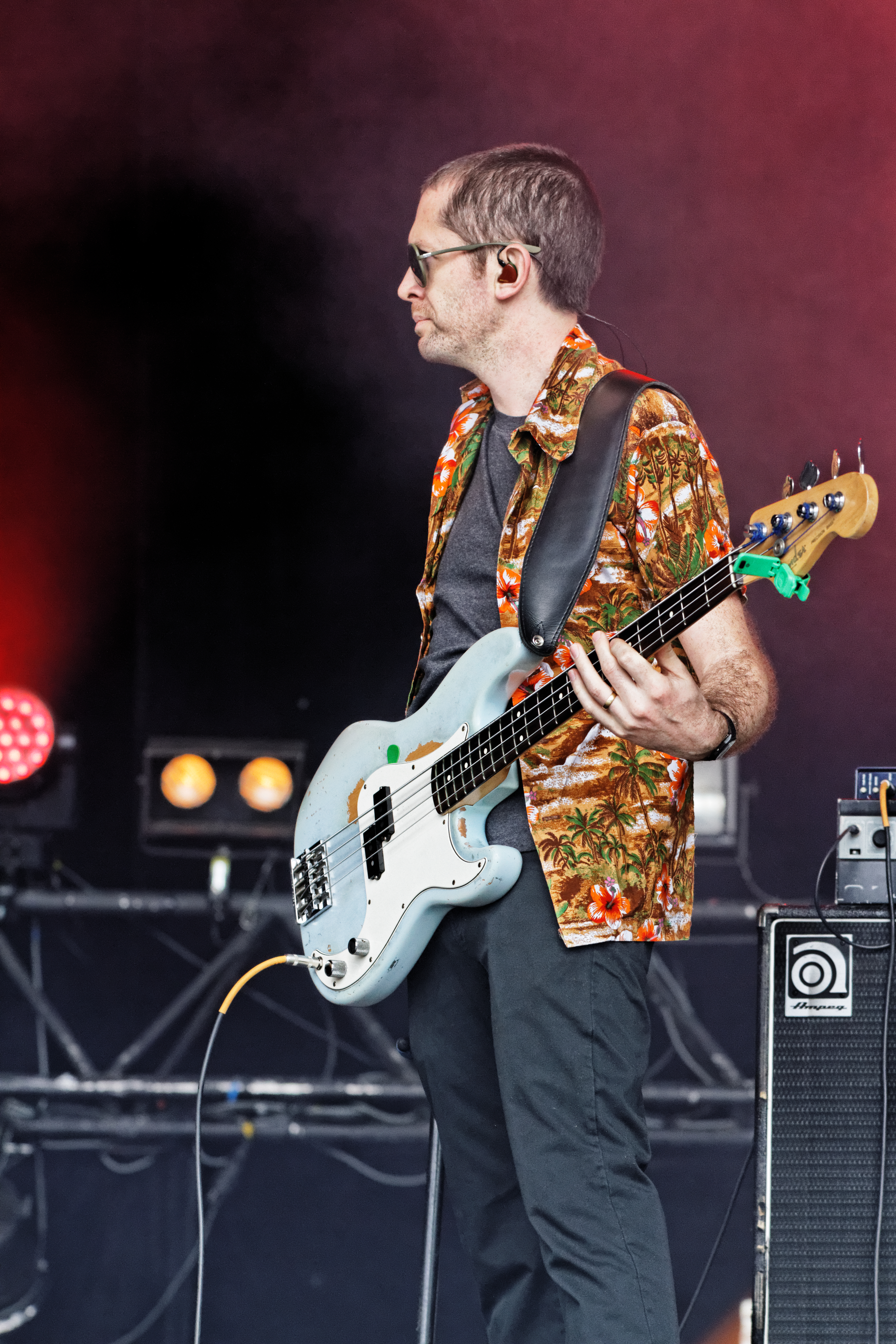

Background information
- Born: 1981 (age 44–45); Australia
- Genres: Jazz; pop
- Occupation: Instrumentalist
- Instruments: Bass, guitar
- Formerly of: The Cat Empire
- Website: ryanmonro.com

Ryan Monro (born 26 July 1981) is an Australian bassist, known for playing with Australian ska and jazz band The Cat Empire. He was bassist for The Cat Empire from its inception until 2021 and also plays in jazz trio "The Genie", which includes fellow Cat Empire members, Ollie McGill on keyboards and Will Hull Brown on drums, and in Melbourne psych/progressive rock band Psi Phi, also alongside Hull-Brown. His cousin is Shaun Taylor, a farmer, and chef.

Monro originally started playing guitar in grade 9 at Frankston High School but soon moved to electric bass. He later picked up double bass and after graduating from high school, attended the Victorian College of Arts. In late 1999, Monro met and began playing in a trio with Ollie McGill on keyboards and Felix Riebl on percussion and vocals. Calling themselves "The Cat Empire", they started playing a wide variety of gigs in clubs like Dizzy's and Bennett's Lane in Melbourne. The band soon expanded in 2001 adding Harry James Angus on trumpet, Will Hull-Brown on drums and Jamshid "Jumps" Khadiwala as a DJ. With the band, he released eight studio albums. It was announced in March 2021 that Monro was retiring from the band. He was scheduled to play his last show at the Sidney Myer Music Bowl on 6 March 2021, however he rejoined the band to play their final Melbourne shows in December 2021. He played his final show with the band on 16 December 2021. Since 2017, he has played bass for Melbourne band The Meltdown.

He created a recording of Telstra's speaking clock before it went offline in 2019 and used the recording for a new website, 1194online.com.

== Discography ==
Solo

- Isolated Bass (2021)

with The Cat Empire

- The Cat Empire (2003)
- Two Shoes (2005)
- Cities: The Cat Empire Project (2006)
- So Many Nights (2007)
- Cinema (2010)
- Steal the Light (2013)
- Rising with the Sun (2016)
- Stolen Diamonds (2019)

with The Genie

- Here Come the Scissors (2011)
- Two (2013)

=== with Psi Phi ===
- PSI PHI (2026)

Other session work

- Jackson Jackson – The Fire is on the Bird (2007)
- Jackson Jackson – Tools For Survival (2008)
- Bran Nue Dae (2009)
- Washington – I Believe You Liar (2010) (on "One Man Band")
- Magnolia – This is Magnolia (2010)
- Owl Eyes – Faces EP (2010)
- Jackson Jackson – Dave EP (2011)
- Felix Riebl – Into the Rain (2011)
- Luke Howard – Sun, Cloud (2013)
- Ella Hooper – In Tongues (2014)
- Felix Riebl – Paper Doors (2016)
- Luke Howard – Two Places (2016)
- Olivia Newton-John: Hopelessly Devoted to You (TV score – 2018)
- Delta Goodrem – I Honestly Love You (2018)
- Daniel Farrugia – Replicants (2021)
- Felix Riebl – Everyday Amen (2022)
- The Meltdown – It's a Long Road (2022)
- Kate Ceberano – My Life is a Symphony (2023)
- Rob Grant – Lost at Sea (2023)
- The Meltdown — Live at the Nightcat (2023)
