= The Fire Is on the Bird =

Studio album by Jackson Jackson
- Released: 27 March 2007
- Genre: Hip hop
- Length: 61:58
- Label: EMI Music Australia
- Producer: Jan Skubiszewski

Jackson Jackson chronology
The Fire Is on the Bird (2007)	Tools for Survival (2008)

The Fire Is on the Bird is the first studio album by Australian hip hop band Jackson Jackson. It was issued on 27 March 2007 via EMI Music Australia with Jan Skubiszewski producing.

== Release ==
The track "My Robot" was released exclusively to the iTunes Store. The untitled hidden track is absent on the iTunes Store.

== Reception ==
At the ARIA Music Awards of 2007, The Fire Is on the Bird received a nomination for Best Urban Release.

== Track listing ==
No.	Title	Length
1.	"A Hole in the Garden"	4:32
2.	"The International Society of Bad Dancers"	3:57
3.	"Cats Rats and Pigeons"	4:03
4.	"Eliza"	6:00
5.	"Angel Dust"	4:21
6.	"The Flicker and the Spark"	4:24
7.	"Grab a Gun"	3:09
8.	"Intelligent Evolved and Insane"	4:35
9.	"Down to the River"	2:54
10.	"The Fire is on the Bird"	1:58
11.	"Waxed World"	4:03
12.	"The Future is the Past"	5:40
13.	"[Untitled hidden track]"	4:23
14.	"The Lonely Ooh"	1:46
15.	"My Robot"	5:16
Total length:		61:58

== Personnel ==
See Jackson Jackson#Band members
