= So Many Nights =

Studio album by the Cat Empire
- Released: 22 September 2007
- Studios: Sing Sing Studios, Morning View Studios
- Length: 51:26
- Label: Two Shoes Pty Ltd
- Producer: John Porter

The Cat Empire chronology
Cities (2006)	So Many Nights (2007)	Cinema (2010)

Singles from So Many Nights
- 1. "No Longer There" Released: 8 September 2007; 2. "So Many Nights" Released: 8 December 2007; 3. "Fishies" Released: 28 January 2008

Professional ratings
Review scores
Source	Rating
Paste Magazine	(favorable)
Tiny Mix Tapes	3.5/5 stars

So Many Nights is the Cat Empire's fourth studio album. On 30 July 2007, the band announced on their website and to their mailing list that the album has been released on 22 September. The release of the album was followed by an Australian tour in September and October. On 14 October, the band broke a record by playing eight shows in seven nights at Sydney's Metro Theatre. The previous record was held by You Am I for seven shows in seven nights at the same venue.

The Cat Empire held a massive launch party at the Prince of Wales in Melbourne on 22 September at midnight to promote the launch of the new album. "No Longer There" was the first single from the album, and was released on 8 September.

On 19 September, the entire album was added to a site for free streaming, three days before its Australian release.

So Many Nights debuted and peaked at number two on the ARIA Albums Chart on 7 October.

== Track listing ==
All tracks are written by Felix Riebl, unless otherwise indicated

No.	Title	Writer(s)	Length
1.	"So Many Nights"		3:33
2.	"Panama"		3:16
3.	"Fishies"	Felix Riebl; Harry Angus	3:11
4.	"The Darkness"	Angus	5:19
5.	"No Longer There"		3:57
6.	"Lonely Moon"	Angus	3:48
7.	"Sunny Moon"		3:07
8.	"So Long"		3:29
9.	"No Mountain"		3:28
10.	"Strong Coffee"		3:34
11.	"Til the Ocean Takes Us All"	Angus; Riebl	3:22
12.	"Voodoo Cowboy"	Angus	4:02
13.	"Radio Song"		3:09
14.	"Won't Be Afraid"	Riebl; Angus; Ryan Monro; Will Hull-Brown; Ollie McGill; Jamshid Khadiwala	4:11
Total length:			51:26

iTunes Bonus Track
No.	Title	Length
15.	"Rhyme and Reason" (Demo)	5:13
Total length:		56:39

Velour Recordings (US release)
No.	Title	Writer(s)	Length
1.	"So Many Nights"		3:33
2.	"Panama"		3:16
3.	"Fishies"	Riebl; Angus	3:11
4.	"Sunny Moon"		3:07
5.	"Til the Ocean Takes Us All"	Riebl; Angus	3:22
6.	"No Mountain"		3:28
7.	"So Long"		3:29
8.	"No Longer There"		3:57
9.	"Lonely Moon"	Angus	3:48
10.	"Radio Song"		3:09
11.	"The Darkness"	Angus	5:19
12.	"Voodoo Cowboy"	Angus	4:02
13.	"Strong Coffee"		3:34
14.	"Won't Be Afraid"	Riebl; Angus; Ryan Monro; Will Hull-Brown; Ollie McGill; Jamshid Khadiwala	4:11
15.	"Wanted to Write a Love Song" (bonus track)		4:53
Total length:			56:19

== Personnel ==
The Cat Empire core members

- Harry James Angus – vocals, trumpet, guitar
- Will Hull-Brown – drums
- Jamshid Khadiwhala – turntables, chekere, castanets, tambourine
- Ollie McGill – piano, wurlitzer, organ, melodica, backing vocals
- Ryan Monro – double bass, bass guitar, guitar, backing vocals
- Felix Riebl – lead vocals, congas, timbales

The Empire Horns (auxiliary members)

- Kieran Conrau – trombone (tracks 2–3, 6, 8–10, 13–14)
- Ross Irwin – trumpet, flugelhorn (tracks 2–3, 6, 8–10, 13–14)

String Section

- Su-Ying Aw – viola (tracks 1–2, 4–6, 9, 11)
- Robert John – violin (tracks 1–2, 4–6, 9, 11)
- Mark Zorz – violin (tracks 1–2, 4–6, 9, 11)
- Leah Hooper – cello (tracks 1–2, 4–6, 9, 11)

Additional musicians

- John Porter – guitar (track 2), slide guitar (track 5)

Recording details

- Produced by – John Porter
- Mixing – John Porter
- Engineering – Adam Rhodes
  - Assistant engineering – Russel Fawkus
  - Overdubs – John Porter
- Studio assistant – Brian (Mad Dog) Gomez
- Mixing – John Porter
  - Assistant mixing – Daisy, Colin Suzuki
- Mastered by – Ryan Smith
- Studio – Sing Sing Studios (recording); Morning View Studios (recording); The Dume Room (mixing); Avatar Studios (mixing); Sterling Sound (mastering)

== Charts ==
Chart (2007)	Peak position
Australian Albums (ARIA)	2

== Certifications ==
Region	Certification	Certified units/sales
Australia (ARIA)	Gold	35,000^{^}
^{^} Shipments figures based on certification alone.
