= Grace Barbé =

Australian musician

- Born: Mahe, Seychelles
- Origin: Western Australia, Australia
- Genres: World music
- Occupations: Singer; songwriter
- Instruments: Vocals; guitar; bass
- Years active: 2005–present
- Labels: Jagra Music; Afrotropik Records
- Website: www.gracebarbe.com

Grace Barbé is a Seychellois-born Australian singer-songwriter who also performs with the Afrobeat and psychedelic band of the same name which includes Jamie Searle (guitar, music director and producer) and Hardy Perrine (drums). Barbé has released three studio albums and is the recipient of thirteen West Australian Music Industry Awards, including ten Best World Act Awards and three WAM Song of the Year awards. Barbé's third album Fanm: Woman was nominated for Best World Album at the 2020 ARIA Music Awards. Barbé sings in Creole, English, French and Malagasy and her music fuses the tropical rhythms and dances of the slaves with psychedelic rock, afrobeat, reggae and pop. Since 2022, she is the current bassist of jazz/funk band The Cat Empire.

== Early life ==
Barbé was born in Mahe, Seychelles Her first experience of Australia came at the age of 6, when her mother received a scholarship to study at a university in Perth. The family returned to Seychelles at the end of her mother's studies, when Barbé was 12. Barbé moved permanently to Australia when she was 16 with her mother, sister and twin brothers and she commenced performing for the Seychellois community living in Perth.

== Career ==
=== 2005–present: Solo albums ===
In 2006, Grace Barbe, James Searle won World/Folk Song for "Mon Ankor Anmourer" at the WAM Song of the Year.

Grace Barbé released her debut single "Mon Arive" in 2007, which received significant airplay, reaching the number one spot on the Triple J Unearthed Roots chart.

In December 2008, Barbé released the debut studio album, Kreol Daughter. The album was launched at Fly By nightclub in Fremantle and was supported by a tour where Barbé and band appeared at major events including the Australasian World Music Expo, Island Vibe, Queenscliff Blue Mountains Music Festival, Bellengen Global Carnival and Darwin and Perth International Arts Festivals.

Welele! was released digitally in November 2013 and on CD in August 2014.

In May 2019, Barbé released the third studio album, Fanm: Woman. The album was nominated for Best World Album at the 2020 ARIA Music Awards.

== Discography ==
=== Albums ===
List of albums, with release date and label shown
Title	Details
Kreol Daughter	Released: December 2008; Label: Jagra Music (JGCD02); Formats: CD, digital download
Welele!	Released: November 2013; Label: Afrotropik Records (ATCD01); Formats: CD, DD
Fanm: Woman	Released: May 2019; Label: Afrotropik Records (ATVA01); Formats: LP, DD, streaming

=== Extended plays ===
List of EPs, with release date and label shown
Title	Details
Grace Barbé	Released: 2007; Label: ProCopy (5697); Formats: CD

== Awards and nominations ==
=== ARIA Music Awards ===
The ARIA Music Awards is an annual awards ceremony that recognises excellence, innovation, and achievement across all genres of Australian music.

Year	Nominee / work	Award	Result
2020	Fanm: Woman	Best World Music Album	Nominated

=== National Live Music Awards ===
The National Live Music Awards are a broad recognition of Australia's diverse and successful live industry, celebrating the diversity and success of the Australian live scene. They commenced in 2016.

Year	Nominee / work	Award	Result
2020	Grace Barbé	Live Bassist of the Year	Nominated

=== WAM Song of the Year ===
The WAM Song of the Year was formed by the Western Australian Rock Music Industry Association Inc. (WARMIA) in 1985, with its main aim to develop and run annual awards recognising achievements within the music industry in Western Australia.

Year	Nominee / work	Award	Result
2006	"Mon Ankor Anmourer" by Grace Barbé and James Searle	World/Folk song of the Year	Won
2014	"Fatige" by Grace Barbé	World/Folk song of the Year	Won
2020	"Mardilo" by Grace Barbé	Global song of the Year	Won

=== West Australian Music Industry Awards ===
The West Australian Music Industry Awards (WAMIs) are annual awards presented to the local contemporary music industry, put on annually by the Western Australian Music Industry Association Inc (WAM). Barbé has won thirteen awards.

Year	Nominee / work	Award	Result (wins only)
2009	Best World Act	Grace Barbé	Won
2010	Best World Act	Grace Barbé	Won
2011	Best World Act	Grace Barbé	Won
2012	Best World Act	Grace Barbé	Won
2013	Best World Act	Grace Barbé	Won
2015	Best World Act	Grace Barbé	Won
2016	Best World Act	Grace Barbé	Won
2018	Best World Act	Grace Barbé	Won
2019	Best World Act	Grace Barbé	Won
2019	Best Vocalist	Grace Barbé	Won
2020	Best World Act	Grace Barbé	Won
2020	Best Vocalist	Grace Barbé	Won
2020	Best Bassist	Grace Barbé	Won
