= Live on Earth (Cat Empire album) =

Live album by The Cat Empire
- Released: 21 February 2009
- Recorded: 2006 – 2008
- Genre: Alternative rock
- Length: 136:10
- Label: EMI

The Cat Empire chronology
On the Attack (2004)	Live on Earth (2009)

Singles from Live on Earth
- 1. "How to Explain? (Live)" Released: 13 February 2009

Professional ratings
Review scores
Source	Rating
MusicOMH	4/5 stars

Live on Earth is the first full-length live album released by Melbourne band The Cat Empire. (The band had previously released an EP disc titled Live @ Adelphia).

The album is a compilation of tracks recorded at shows between August 2006 and December 2008. It included songs recorded at venues in Australia, France, the UK, the US and Canada. The album was originally scheduled to be released on 28 February 2009 in Australia, but was officially released a week earlier (though many retailers released the album days before the 21st.)

Live on Earth was available with a signed album cover via online pre-order.

The first single from the album, "How to Explain?", was released on the iTunes Store on 13 February 2009. The album also features a French-language cover version of the Eagles song "Hotel California" recorded in Montreal, Canada.

== Track listing ==
All tracks are written by Felix Riebl, unless otherwise indicated

Disc one
No.	Title	Writer(s)	Length
1.	"Fishies" (19 October 2007: The Metro Theatre, Sydney)	Felix Riebl, Harry Angus	5:01
2.	"The Car Song" (13 October 2007: Triple J's AWOL Concert, Burnie)	Angus	9:21
3.	"So Many Nights" (28 December 2007: Woodford Folk Festival, Woodford)		4:09
4.	"Lonely Moon" (5 October 2007: Iwaki Auditorium, Melbourne)	Angus	4:33
5.	"How to Explain?" (3 February 2008: Sidney Myer Music Bowl, Melbourne)		5:51
6.	"Days Like These" (11 June 2007: Le Trabendo, Paris)	Riebl, Angus, Ollie McGill	4:21
7.	"Dumb Things" (3 August 2006: Shepherds Bush Empire, London)	Paul Kelly	3:51
8.	"The Lost Song" (5 October 2006: Métropolis, Montreal)		7:45
9.	"The Rhythm" (13 February 2007: Bowery Ballroom, New York)	Riebl, Angus	5:17
10.	"The Wine Song" (3 February 2008: Sidney Myer Music Bowl, Melbourne)	Angus	10:40
11.	"All That Talking" (5 October 2007: Iwaki Auditorium, Melbourne)		6:50

Disc two
No.	Title	Writer(s)	Length
1.	"The Chariot" (19 October 2007: The Metro Theatre, Sydney)		7:17
2.	"Til the Ocean Takes Us All" (13 October 2007: Triple J's AWOL Concert, Burnie)	Angus, Riebl	4:08
3.	"Sly" (18 October 2007: The Metro Theatre, Sydney)		5:33
4.	"Hello" (13 October 2007: Triple J's AWOL Concert, Burnie)		3:55
5.	"Hotel California" (5 October 2006: Métropolis, Montreal)	Don Felder, Don Henley, Glenn Frey	3:55
6.	"Rhyme and Reason" (5 October 2006: Métropolis, Montreal)		6:34
7.	"Two Shoes" (4 October 2007: Iwaki Auditorium, Melbourne)		5:29
8.	"In My Pocket" (28 December 2007: Woodford Folk Festival, Woodford)	Angus	12:06
9.	"No Longer There" (3 February 2008: Sidney Myer Music Bowl, Melbourne)		3:51
10.	"The Darkness" (3 February 2008: Sidney Myer Music Bowl, Melbourne)	Angus	9:24
11.	"Sunny Moon" (3 February 2008: Sidney Myer Music Bowl, Melbourne)		6:26
Total length:			136:17

iTunes Bonus Track
No.	Title	Writer(s)	Length
1.	"Sol y Sombra" (November 2006: Stage 88, Parkes)	Riebl, Angus, McGill, Ryan Monro	7:52
Total length:			7:52

== Live at the Bowl ==
A 2-disc DVD was also released the same time as Live on Earth entitled Live at the Bowl. The first disc contains footage of their entire concert at Sidney Myer Music Bowl. The second disc contains a 'backstage pass' with moments from their recent overseas tour captured on Ryan's camera. It also contains videos from their first concert as a six piece in 2001, 3 tracks from Triple J's AWOL in 2007 at Burnie, Tasmania, and 2 tracks from their performance with the Australian Youth Orchestra in 2008.

=== Track listing ===
1. Sunny Moon
2. So Many Nights
3. Til the Ocean Takes Us All
4. The Rhythm
5. In My Pocket
6. Sly
7. No Longer There
8. Two Shoes
9. The Wine Song
10. Fishies
11. The Darkness
12. The Chariot

== Charts ==
Chart (2009)	Peak position
Australian Albums (ARIA)	14

== Certifications ==
Region	Certification	Certified units/sales
Australia (ARIA)	Gold	7,500^{^}
^{^} Shipments figures based on certification alone.
