= Cities (The Cat Empire album) =

Studio album by the Cat Empire
- Released: 1 April 2006
- Recorded: 2005–2006 at Sing Sing Studios, Richmond, Victoria
- Genres: Soul; funk; jazz; rock; hip-hop
- Length: 45:32
- Label: EMI/Virgin
- Producers: Felix Riebl; The Cat Empire

The Cat Empire chronology
Two Shoes (2005)	Cities (2006)	So Many Nights (2007)

Cities is the third studio album by Australian band the Cat Empire, released on 1 April 2006 through Virgin Records. The album consists of music recorded for the band's performance at the 2006 Commonwealth Games opening ceremony the previous month. A limited release, 10,000 individually numbered copies have been made in digipak format. It was released less than a year after their previous album, Two Shoes.

At the 2006 Fine Arts Awards, the album won an ARIA Music Award under the category Best World Music Album.

The album was recorded at Sing Sing Studios in Richmond, Melbourne, Australia.

== Description ==
The band states the following about Cities on their website – "This project is somewhere in between a tribute to our own city and an experiment in sounds that we’ve found abroad. The approach to this record was far less precious than it was for our debut and Two Shoes. It was a kind of surprise record we almost didn’t expect to make. We wrote the material very quickly, and had an excellent and robust few weeks recording it. The record is in some ways serious and in some ways stupendous. There are ethnics, locals, sad songs, adventure songs, musical chorus’, screamers, and a collection of soul references. There are strings sections, Sitars, Tablas, horn sections, short punchy arrangements as well as some excellent solos. It is the kind of recording in which people might get to hear a different side of the Cat Empire, but it's still soulful, strange, humorous, whimsical, sometimes sad, sometimes delirious, mis-placed and undoubtedly Catempiracle as well."

== Track listing ==
All tracks are written by Felix Riebl, unless otherwise indicated

No.	Title	Writer(s)	Length
1.	"Cities"	Felix Riebl; Harry Angus	3:23
2.	"Boogaloo"	Riebl; Ross Irwin	3:30
3.	"Siente"	Riebl; Ollie McGill	2:43
4.	"Motion"		3:43
5.	"Song for the Day"	Riebl; McGill	3:47
6.	"Know Your Name"		3:21
7.	"Song for Elias"		4:32
8.	"Jungle"	Angus	2:12
9.	"Down at the 303"	Angus	2:40
10.	"Side to Side"		3:53
11.	"Waltz"		4:24
12.	"Luck Song"	Riebl; McGill	3:30
13.	"Anymore"		3:52
Total length:			45:32

iTunes Bonus Track
No.	Title	Length
1.	"Miss Soul"	4:37
Total length:		4:37

== Personnel ==
The Cat Empire core members

- Harry James Angus – vocals, trumpet, backing vocals
- Will Hull-Brown – drums
- Jamshid Khadiwhala – turntables, tambourine
- Ollie McGill – piano, keyboard, Hammond organ, melodica, backing vocals
- Ryan Monro – double bass, bass guitar, backing vocals
- Felix Riebl – lead vocals, percussion, backing vocals

The Empire Horns (auxiliary members)

- Ross Irwin – trumpet, flugelhorn, backing vocals
- Kieran Conrau – trombone, backing vocals
- Carlo Barbaro – tenor saxophone, baritone saxophone, flute

Additional musicians

- violin – Alyssa Conrau
- cello – Kristy Conrau
- guitar – Novak Conrad
- tablas – Bobby Singh (tracks 1–2)
- sitar – Kumar Shome (track 1)
- tambourine – Greg Sheehan (track 11)
- vocals – Julie O'Hara (tracks 4–5, 7, 10–12); Nina Ferro (tracks 4–5, 10–11)

Recording details

- Produced by – Felix Riebl, The Cat Empire
- Mixing – Adam Rhodes
- Recording – Adam Rhodes
- Arranged by – Ross Irwin, Ollie McGill (track 3)
- Mastering – Ross Cockle
- Assistant engineering – Russel Fawkus

== Charts ==
Chart (2006)	Peak position
Australian Albums (ARIA)	11
