= Jan Skubiszewski =

Jan Skubiszewski (pronounced /ˈskuːbiːˈʃɛz.skiː/; born 1981) is an Australian composer, record producer, songwriter and sound engineer from Melbourne, Australia. He is also a professional multi-instrumentalist. His work as a record producer and composer for film and television has resulted in numerous gold and number one records, won critical acclaim and numerous awards and nominations at ARIA, APRA, AIR, Film Critics Circle of Australia, Logie Awards, Screen Music Awards, National Indigenous Music Awards.

== Early life ==
Skubiszewski was born in Melbourne. After spending his early childhood in the Otway Ranges rain forest, he moved to the Melbourne suburb of East St Kilda. His musical education began early under the guidance of his father, acclaimed Polish-Australian film and TV composer Cezary Skubiszewski.

== Career ==
=== Education and early work: first APRA award ===
After studying fine art at the Victorian College of the Arts, Skubiszewski worked as a sound engineer and producer at Sing Sing Studio, whilst also writing and producing in his own right.

In 1999 at the age of 18, Skubiszewski collaborated with his father Cezary to compose the score for Two Hands starring Heath Ledger, which won the APRA award for Best Film Score.

=== 2000-2010: Gold records, ARIA Award, number one records, Screen Music Awards, and AIR nominations ===
Throughout the 2000s, Skubiszewski began to gain widespread recognition as a songwriter, producer and performing musician, securing awards and nominations at APRA, AIR and ARIA for songwriting and production work with Illy, Phrase, The Cat Empire and Daniel Merriweather, as well as his own band Jackson Jackson, a joint project with Harry James Angus that secured an ARIA nomination for Best Urban Album in 2007.

In 2007, Skubiszewski worked with British producer Mark Ronson as an engineer on Ronson's album Stop Me, which reached number 2 in the UK singles charts.

He also produced his first Gold Record for the Cat Empire.

During this period, Skubiszewski continued collaborated on film and television projects with Cezary, including film and television hits such as Bran Nue Dae, Hating Alison Ashley, Book of Revelation, Serangoon Road (which won the APRA award for Best Music for a Television Series or Serial) and Carla Cametti PD (which was nominated for Best Television Theme).

=== 2011-2020: Multiple number one records and gold discs, Screen Music Awards, ARIA Awards ===
Skubiszewski's status as one of Australia's top producers was consolidated by a stream of awards, nominations, number one hits, gold records and critical acclaim throughout the 2010s. Some key milestones were:

- At the 2014 ARIA awards, Skubiszewski was recognised for producing the ARIA-award winning record Flesh & Blood by John Butler Trio. The album debuted and peaked at number 2 on the ARIA Albums Chart and was certified gold.
- In 2014, Skubiszewski co-wrote and produced the single "On and On" on Cinematic with Illy, which was nominated for Best Urban Album at the ARIA awards and which garnered critical and commercial success upon release, debuting at number four on the Australian ARIA Albums Chart.
- The same year, Skubiszewski and father Cezary won the APRA Screen Music Award for Serangoon Road in the Best Music for a Television Series category.
- In 2016 'Rising With The Sun' by The Cat Empire, produced and recorded by Skubiszewski, debuted at number one on the ARIA and AIR charts in Australia, staying in the AIR top 20 for 21 weeks.
- In 2017, Skubiszewski's production on Dan Sultan's record Killer, was recognised when the album was nominated for three ARIA awards and met with widespread critical acclaim, specifically for Skubiszewski's production, including four stars from Rolling Stone.
- In 2018 Skubiszewski won the APRA 2018 Screen Music Awards for the score of Picnic at Hanging Rock (another collaboration with father Cezary)
- In 2018, John Butler's record 'Home', which Skubiszewski produced, debuted at number one on the Australian charts.
- In 2018, Little J and Big Cuz (an Indigenous children's television, which Skubiszewski wrote the music for with his father Cezary) won the Logie Award for Most Outstanding Children's Program. The program featured Indigenous Australian stars such as Deborah Mailman, Miranda Tapsell, and Aaron Fa’oaso.
- Killer Under a Blood Moon, (produced and recorded by Skubiszewski) was nominated for two ARIA awards in 2018 - a collaboration between Dan Sultan, Gang of Youths' David Le'aupepe, AB Original, Camp Cope and Meg Mac. It debuted at number 5 on the ARIA Albums Chart.
- Nali and Friends, a children's record released by ABC Music by Dan Sultan which Skubiszewski produced, won the 2019 ARIA award for Best Children's record after it debuted at number one on the children's chart, beating The Wiggles, and at number 22 on the ARIA chart.

=== 2020-present ===
- In 2021, Jan won the Screen Music Awards, Australia for Best Television Theme for Halifax: Retribution.
- In 2022 Little J and Big Cuz (an Indigenous children's television, which Skubiszewski wrote the music for with his father Cezary) won its second Logie Award for Most Outstanding Children's Program.
- In 2022, Jan composed the score for the documentary In the Water Behind the Lens
- In 2023, Jan composed the music for season 4 of Little J and Big Cuz
- In 2024, Skubiszewski composed the score for High Country season 1. High Country premiered on 19 March 2024 on Foxtel-on-demand service, Binge, followed by a television screening on Foxtel's Showcase.
- Skubiszewski won the APRA award for Best Music for a Television Drama for High Country
- In 2025, Skubiszewski composed the score for Playing Gracie Darling, distributed by Paramount+ in Australia and Sony Pictures Television worldwide.

=== Red Moon Studios ===
In June 2017, Skubiszewski and his wife opened Red Moon Studios, formerly The Stables, a music production studio in the Macedon Ranges specialising in high-end record production and film composition.

== Personal life ==
Skubiszewski lives in Brunswick with his wife Ilaria Walker and their two children.

An advocate of Indigenous Australian music, Skubiszewski has worked with numerous celebrated Indigenous artists such as Archie Roach, A.B. Original Yothu Yindi's founding members Deadly Award winning Djolpa McKenzie, Dan Sultan and Music Victoria Award-winning Benny Walker, and has composed music for Indigenous TV shows and films including Little J and Big Cuz, High Country and Bran Nue Dae.

When not composing or producing, Skubiszewski plays in bands, including The Counterfeit, which performs iconic film scores at venues including Thornbury Theatre, Brunswick Ballroom, Memo Music Hall and Theatre Royal, and headlined at Boogie Festival.
