= Ollie McGill =

Australian keyboardist (born 1981)

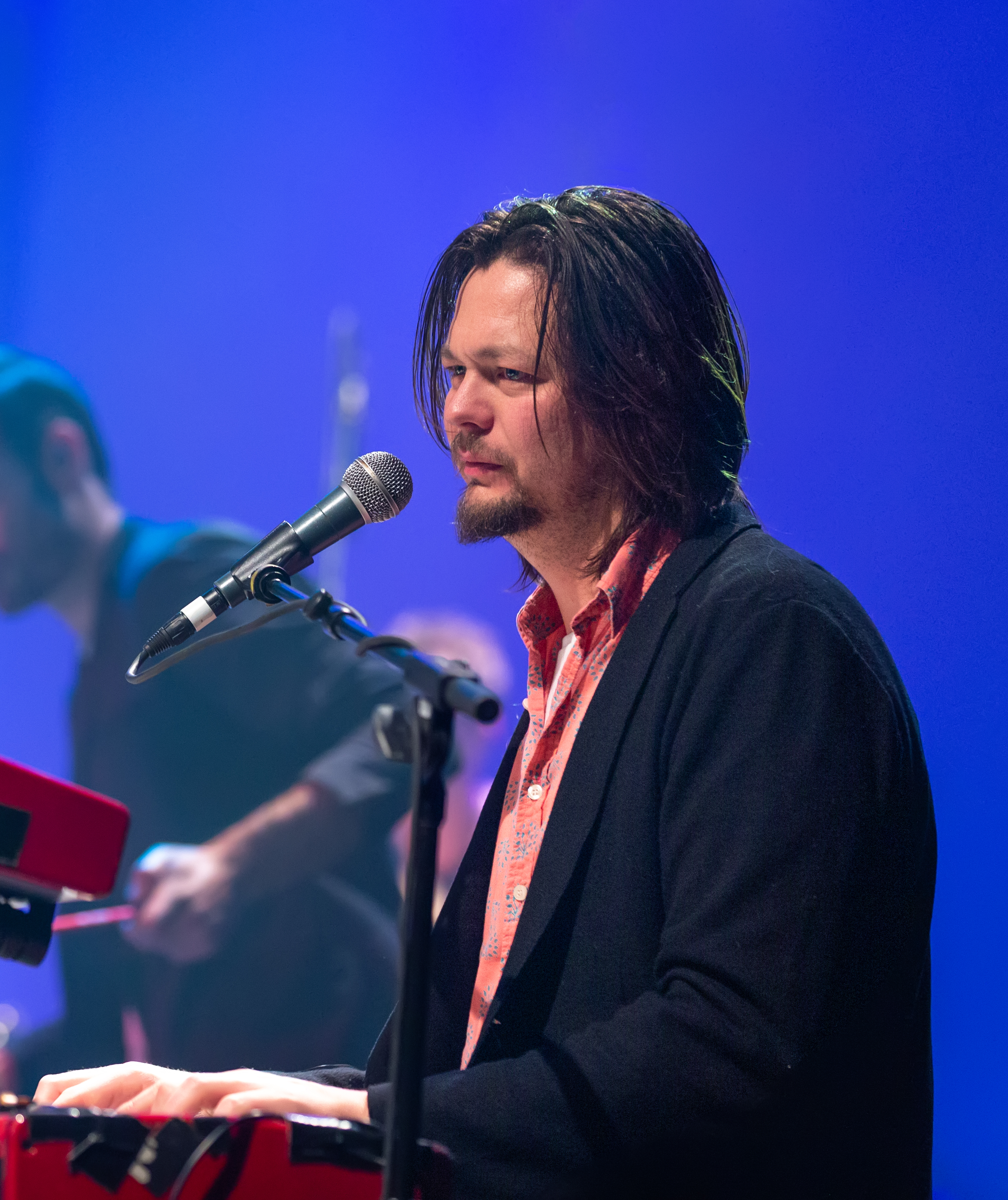
- McGill performing in Toronto, 2019

Background information
- Born: Oliver James McGill; 2 November 1981 (age 45); Melbourne, Australia
- Genres: Ska, jazz, Latin, reggae, alternative rock
- Occupation: Musician
- Instruments: Keyboards, piano
- Years active: 1999–present

Oliver James McGill (born 2 November 1981) is an Australian musician who is the keyboard player for The Cat Empire. He is also a member of several other bands, including The Genie (a fusion band), The Conglomerate (a modern jazz quartet), Peaking Duck, Outlier, The Future, 77, and Past Ollie's Bedtime. He also composed "Dumb Ways to Die" for Metro Trains Melbourne.

== Biography ==
Ollie McGill attended Wesley College, Melbourne, Australia. In 1999, McGill, on piano, was a member of Jazz Cats, a nine-piece jazz group, which issued a four-track extended play, The Jazz Cat. Late that year, McGill on keyboards, Ryan Monro on double bass, and Felix Riebl on percussion and vocals founded a split-off group, The Cat Empire.

During 2004, McGill and Harry Angus (also of The Cat Empire) on trumpet and lead vocals, Jules Pascoe on bass guitar, and Harry Shaw-Reynolds on drums formed an improvisational jazz quartet, The Conglomerate. In September 2005, McGill was a founder of a four-piece jazz ensemble, Peaking Duck, with Munro (also in The Cat Empire) on bass guitar, Dave Ades on saxophone, and James Hauptmann on drums.

In November 2012, he composed the song "Dumb Ways to Die", for Metro Trains Melbourne, via agency McCann Melbourne. It reached the top 10 of the iTunes charts within 24 hours, while the video went viral, achieving over 6 million views in just three days.

In June 2017, McGill began his side project with Georgie Chorley, and the band HipMama was created. Inspired by New Orleans jazz and neo soul, the debut EP was released in November 2022.

McGill also works as a producer, having produced two EPs for ILUKA (Nikki Thorburn) and a number of tracks for Phoebe Eve.
