= Felix Riebl =

Australian singer, songwriter, and composer

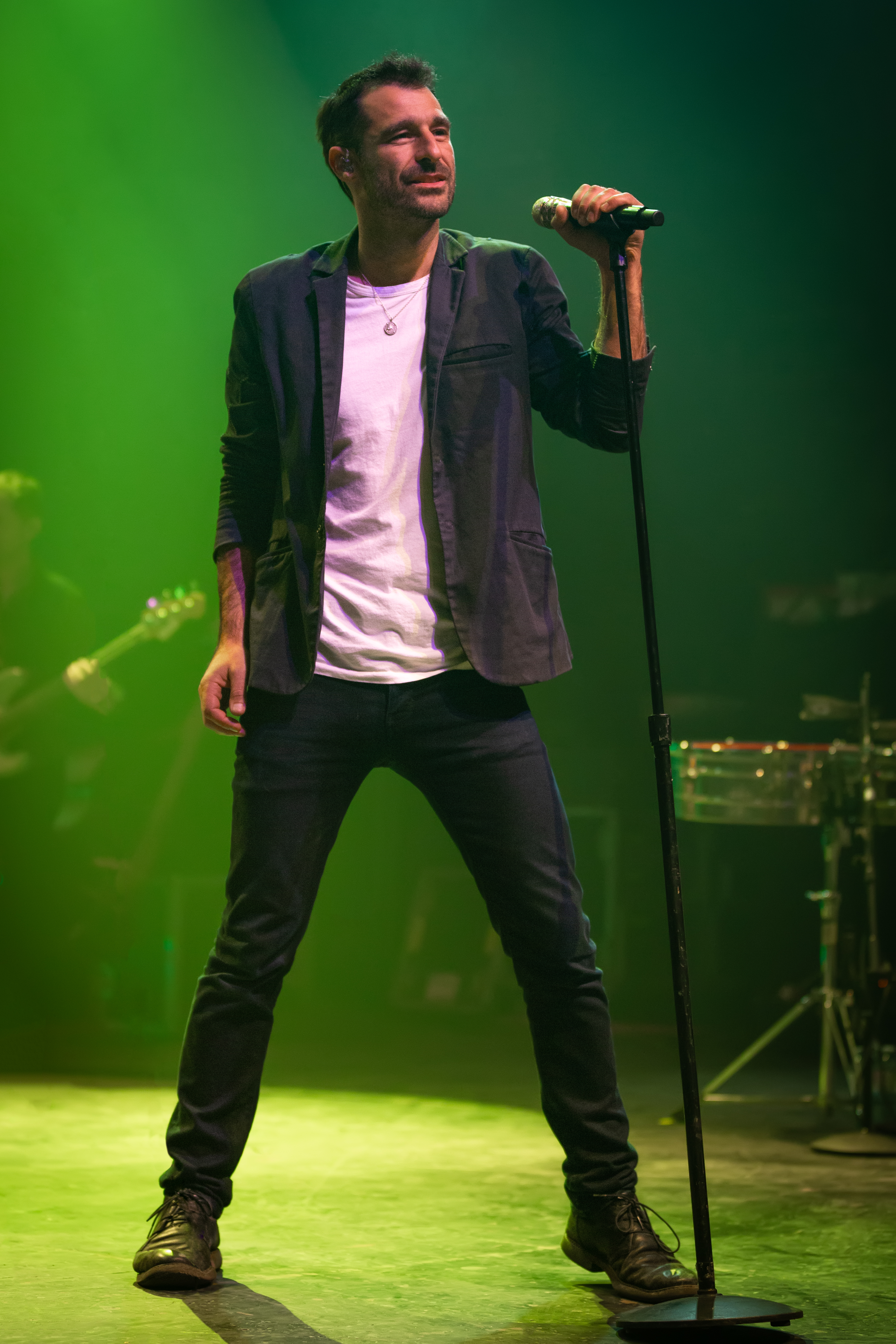
- Riebl performing in Toronto, 2019

Background information
- Born: 1 May 1981 (age 45); Melbourne, Victoria, Australia
- Genres: Alternative rock; jazz; ska; blues; classical
- Occupations: Singer-songwriter; musician; composer
- Instruments: Vocals; percussion; piano
- Years active: 1999–present
- Labels: Kobalt; EMI; Virgin; Indica; Velour; UMG
- Website: www.felixriebl.com

Felix Riebl (born 1 May 1981) is a singer, songwriter, and composer based in Melbourne. He is the co-founder, band leader and principal songwriter of the internationally acclaimed band The Cat Empire, who have made multi-platinum albums, and are the 2006 winner of the World Music Aria Award for their album Cities.

Outside of his work with The Cat Empire, Riebl has composed music for the Australia Day Spectacular at Darling Harbour in 2013, the 2006 Commonwealth Games in Melbourne, The Dream Festival on the Yarra River in 2009, and Australia's first ever White Night in Melbourne in 2013.

== Early life and family ==
Felix Riebl was born in Melbourne to an Austrian father and an Australian mother, and was educated at Scotch College, Melbourne. He spent his childhood living in Europe before moving back to Australia when he was in his early teens. Riebl's childhood was surrounded by music: his uncle, Thomas, was a professor of viola at the Mozarteum Salzburg, and family members, including his cousin Misty who was an aspiring artist, studying at the Victorian College of the Arts would regularly take him to sit amongst the Vienna Philharmonic.

Of his family, Riebl said in an interview with the Sydney Morning Herald that

"My sister is a classical pianist, my brother's a singer, and dad's brother is quite a famous viola player in Austria. We listened to a lot of music and we danced a lot and sang a lot. The older I get, the realisation comes that a lot of this starts early in the family."

Riebl's younger brother, Max (1991–2022), sang and played trumpet on the song "Miserere" on The Cat Empire's second album Two Shoes.

== Career ==
=== 1999–2022: The Cat Empire ===
In 1999, Riebl co-founded The Cat Empire with Ollie McGill and Ryan Monro. He was the primary songwriter on the band's self-titled debut album, including being the sole writer of their first single, "Hello". In addition to his role as a musician in the band, Riebl helped produce the albums Two Shoes and Cities.

=== 2011-present: solo career ===
In 2011, Riebl released his debut solo album, Into the Rain. The album featured a number of original compositions, as well as a cover of Bruce Springsteen's "I'm on Fire", whom Riebl cites alongside Mark Knopfler and Bob Dylan as influences on the album. The album was a moderate success, peaking at No. 61 on the Australian iTunes albums chart.

In December 2015, Riebl released the four-track EP Lonely Truth, as a teaser for his second solo album. The song "Crocodiles", inspired by a trip to Timor-Leste, was released as a single in January 2016.

In January 2016, the Pilbara Project choir premiered Riebl's song-cycle based on the Pilbara.

Riebl released his second solo album Paper Doors, on 2 September 2016 to positive reviews. Rolling Stone Australia gave the album 3.5 stars out of 4, praising Riebl as "far more than the frontman for one of Australia's most enduring party bands". Paper Doors peaked at No. 46 on the ARIA Charts and at No. 31 on Australian iTunes.

In January 2017, Riebl released the tribute song "Ms Dhu" and an accompanying music video, following the release of the inquest into the death of Ms Dhu. Since 2015, Riebl has been composer and creative director for the Indigenous choral ensemble Spinifex Gum.

In July 2022, Riebl announced the forthcoming release of his third solo studio album, Everyday Amen, with the title track as its lead single.

== Personal life ==
In 2014, Riebl was living in Fitzroy. Politically, he aligns himself with The Greens.

He was an ambassador for the Indigenous Literacy Foundation in 2012, alongside Australian author and cartoonist Kaz Cooke, and in 2019 became a global Ambassador for Children's Ground, an organisation that supports the wellbeing of First Nations children in Australia. Riebl has spoken about the importance of taking action on climate change, and in 2014 participated in public divestment action to protest the loaning of money to coal and gas projects by Australia's biggest banks.

== Discography ==
=== Albums ===
List of albums, with selected details
Title	Details
Into the Rain	Released: 15 July 2011; Format: CD, LP, digital; Label: My Shore Productions (MSP-001-A001)
Paper Doors	Released: 2 September 2016; Format: CD, LP, digital; Label: My Shore Productions (MSP-003-C002)
Everyday Amen	Released: 25 November 2022; Format: CD, LP, digital; Label: My Shore Productions

=== Extended Plays ===
List of EPs, with selected details
Title	Details
Lonely Truth	Released: 4 December 2015; Format: digital; Label: My Shore Productions
Lounge Room Session (Live)	Released: 21 April 2017; Format: digital; Label: My Shore Productions
Black Room White Walls	Released: 21 August 2020; Format: digital; Label: My Shore Productions
