= Triple J's Hottest 100 of 2005 =

13th edition of Triple J Hottest countdown

2005 Triple J Hottest 100
- Album artwork for the CD compilation

Countdown details
- Date of countdown: 26 January 2006

Countdown highlights
- Winning song: Bernard Fanning "Wish You Well"
- Most entries: Wolfmother (6 tracks)

Chronology
← Previous; 2004	Next → 2006

The 2005 Triple J Hottest 100 was announced on 26 January 2006. It was the thirteenth such countdown of the most popular songs of the year, according to listeners of the Australian radio station Triple J.

The broadcast began at 10am AEDT and finished a little before 7pm when the top song was announced. Broadcast live from the Sydney Big Day Out from 12pm AEDT, it regularly crossed to winning artists and listeners around Australia.

Voters were limited to 20 votes each – 10 via SMS (charged at 30c per message) and 10 via the Internet (at no charge).

Wolfmother had the most entries in the countdown with six, at that point the most by an artist in a single countdown. Their record was not equalled until the 2022 countdown 17 years later, by Spacey Jane, and was not surpassed until the following 2023 countdown, by G Flip.

== Full list ==
Note: Australian artists

#	Song	Artist	Country of origin
1	Wish You Well	Bernard Fanning	Australia
2	Catch My Disease	Ben Lee	Australia
3	Feel Good Inc.	Gorillaz featuring De La Soul	United Kingdom/United States
4	Best of You	Foo Fighters	United States
5	Dare	Gorillaz featuring Shaun Ryder	United Kingdom
6	Mind's Eye	Wolfmother	Australia
7	My Doorbell	The White Stripes	United States
8	O Yeah	End of Fashion	Australia
9	Joker & the Thief	Wolfmother	Australia
10	Do You Want To	Franz Ferdinand	United Kingdom
11	Figjam	Butterfingers	Australia
12	Computer Camp Love	Datarock	Norway
13	Gold Digger	Kanye West featuring Jamie Foxx	United States
14	Songbird	Bernard Fanning	Australia
15	Flame Trees	Sarah Blasko	Australia
16	Apple Tree	Wolfmother	Australia
17	Blue Orchid	The White Stripes	United States
18	I Was Only 19	The Herd	Australia
19	Middle of the Hill	Josh Pyke	Australia
20	DOA	Foo Fighters	United States
21	Hurricane	Faker	Australia
22	Do-Do's & Whoa-Oh's	Kisschasy	Australia
23	Two More Years	Bloc Party	United Kingdom
24	Foxtrot Uniform Charlie Kilo	Bloodhound Gang	United States
25	The Car Song	The Cat Empire	Australia
26	Fix You	Coldplay	United Kingdom
27	B.Y.O.B.	System of a Down	United States
28	Everyday I Love You Less and Less	Kaiser Chiefs	United Kingdom
29	Fast Girl	Gyroscope	Australia
30	Concrete Boots	After the Fall	Australia
31	The Special Two	Missy Higgins	Australia
32	My Enemy	Cog	Australia
33	Phoenix	The Butterfly Effect	Australia
34	I Predict a Riot	Kaiser Chiefs	United Kingdom
35	Girl	Beck	United States
36	Speed of Sound	Coldplay	United Kingdom
37	Dimension	Wolfmother	Australia
38	Sly	The Cat Empire	Australia
39	Colossal	Wolfmother	Australia
40	Helicopter	Bloc Party	United Kingdom
41	Dirty Harry	Gorillaz featuring Bootie Brown	United Kingdom/United States
42	Sweet as Sugar	Grinspoon	Australia
43	Autumn Flow	Lior	Australia
44	Sunnyroad	Emilíana Torrini	Iceland
45	Positive Tension	Bloc Party	United Kingdom
46	Juicebox	The Strokes	United States
47	Stuff and Nonsense	Missy Higgins	Australia
48	An Honest Mistake	The Bravery	United States
49	What's on Your Radio	The Living End	Australia
50	I Bet You Look Good on the Dancefloor	Arctic Monkeys	United Kingdom
51	Be Yourself	Audioslave	United States
52	America, Fuck Yeah	Dvda	United States
53	We're All in This Together	Ben Lee	Australia
54	Two Shoes	The Cat Empire	Australia
55	Landed	Ben Folds	United States
56	It'5!	Architecture in Helsinki	Australia
57	Radio/Video	System of a Down	United States
58	Little Sister	Queens of the Stone Age	United States
59	Bloody Mother Fucking Asshole	Martha Wainwright	Canada
60	All the Money or the Simple Life Honey	The Dandy Warhols	United States
61	Jesus of Suburbia	Green Day	United States
62	Beware Wolf	Gyroscope	Australia
63	Divorcee by 23	Clare Bowditch & the Feeding Set	Australia
64	Sitting, Waiting, Wishing	Jack Johnson	United States
65	Always Worth It	Sarah Blasko	Australia
66	Gabrielle	Ween	United States
67	The Denial Twist	The White Stripes	United States
68	Ashes	The Beautiful Girls	Australia
69	Jesus I Was Evil	Butterfingers	Australia
70	This Year	The Mountain Goats	United States
71	Run	Cog	Australia
72	I'm So Postmodern	The Bedroom Philosopher	Australia
73	Better Together	Jack Johnson	United States
74	The Sound of White	Missy Higgins	Australia
75	Qué Onda Guero	Beck	United States
76	Hypnotize	System of a Down	United States
77	First Day of My Life	Bright Eyes	United States
78	The Fighter	After the Fall	Australia
79	Fuck Forever	Babyshambles	United Kingdom
80	Believe	The Chemical Brothers	United Kingdom
81	Let's Take the Long Way Home	The Beautiful Girls	Australia
82	Smoke It	The Dandy Warhols	United States
83	Filthy/Gorgeous	Scissor Sisters	United States
84	White Unicorn	Wolfmother	Australia
85	Tightrope Walker	Epicure	Australia
86	Into the Dark	Ben Lee	Australia
87	We Can't Hear You	The Herd	Australia
88	Like Eating Glass	Bloc Party	United Kingdom
89	Bastard	Ben Folds	United States
90	Walk Away	Franz Ferdinand	United Kingdom
91	Heartstopper	Emilíana Torrini	Iceland
92	Messages	Xavier Rudd	Australia
93	The Fallen	Franz Ferdinand	United Kingdom
94	On This Side	Clare Bowditch & the Feeding Set	Australia
95	Face Without a Name	Kisschasy	Australia
96	Six Months in a Leaky Boat	Little Birdy	Australia
97	Themata	Karnivool	Australia
98	Why Do You Love Me	Garbage	United States
99	Evie, Pt. 1	The Wrights	Australia
100	Party Started	The Cat Empire	Australia

== Statistics ==
=== Artists with multiple entries ===
#	Artist	Entries
6	Wolfmother	6, 9, 16, 37, 39, 84
5	Kele Okereke (Note: Four times with Bloc Party (23, 40, 45, 88), once with The Chemical Brothers (80))	23, 40, 45, 80, 88
4	Bloc Party	23, 40, 45, 88
4	The Cat Empire	25, 38, 54, 100
3	Ben Lee	2, 53, 86
3	Gorillaz	3, 5, 41
3	The White Stripes	7, 17, 67
3	Franz Ferdinand	10, 90, 93
3	System of a Down	27, 57, 76
3	Missy Higgins	31, 47, 74
2	Bernard Fanning	1, 14
2	Foo Fighters	4, 20
2	Butterfingers	11, 69
2	Sarah Blasko	15, 65
2	The Herd	18, 87
2	Kisschasy	22, 95
2	Coldplay	26, 36
2	Kaiser Chiefs	28, 34
2	Gyroscope	29, 62
2	After the Fall	30, 78
2	Cog	32, 71
2	Beck	35, 75
2	Emiliana Torrini	44, 91
2	Chris Cheney (Note: Once with The Living End (49), once with The Wrights (99).)	49, 99
2	Ben Folds	55, 89
2	The Dandy Warhols	60, 82
2	Clare Bowditch	63, 94
2	Jack Johnson	64, 71

=== Countries Represented ===
Country	Entries
Australia	50
United States	30
United Kingdom	17
Iceland	2
Norway	1
Canada	1

=== Records ===
- Bernard Fanning set a new record as the only artist to win the Hottest 100 three times, having previously won the countdown with Powderfinger in 1999 and 2000.
  - Fanning also joins Denis Leary (1993) and Alex Lloyd (2001) as the only outright solo countdown winners.
- Ben Lee is the first artist to finish second twice in the Hottest 100, previously finishing second with "Cigarettes Will Kill You" in 1998. Similarly, The Cat Empire are the first artist to secure the No. 100 spot for a second time, having first done so in 2003
- Gorillaz featured twice in the Top 5, the first act to do so since Powderfinger in 2000.
- "Jesus of Suburbia" by Green Day becomes the longest song to appear in a countdown at 9:08. "Runaway" by Kanye West would later equaled this record in 2010.
- The Living End made their ninth consecutive appearance in the Hottest 100, having featured in every annual countdown since 1997. Similarly, The Chemical Brothers made their fifth consecutive appearance, having appeared in every annual countdown since 2000.
- The White Stripes appeared in the Top 10 for the third consecutive year, equaling Powderfinger's record set between 1998 and 2000.

== Top 10 Albums of 2005 ==
Bold indicates winner of the Hottest 100. Wolfmother won the inaugural J Award for their self-titled album.

#	Artist	Album	Country of origin	Tracks in the Hottest 100
1	Wolfmother	Wolfmother	Australia	6, 9, 16, 37, 39, 84 (45 in 2004 & 80 in 2006)
2	Bloc Party	Silent Alarm	United Kingdom	23, 40, 45, 88
3	The White Stripes	Get Behind Me Satan	United States	7, 17, 67
4	**Bernard Fanning**	**Tea & Sympathy**	**Australia**	**1, 14**
5	Gorillaz	Demon Days	United Kingdom	3, 5, 41
6	Franz Ferdinand	You Could Have It So Much Better	United Kingdom	10, 90, 93
7	Foo Fighters	In Your Honor	United States	4, 20
8	Queens of the Stone Age	Lullabies to Paralyze	United States	58
9	Ben Lee	Awake Is the New Sleep	Australia	2, 53, 86 (15 in 2004)
10	System of a Down	Mezmerize	United States	27, 57

== CD release ==
The 2-CD set titled triple j – Hottest 100: Vol 13 Various Artists was released in 2006. It is a compilation of 41 of the top 100 songs.

**CD 1**
1. Bernard Fanning – "Wish You Well"
2. Wolfmother – "Colossal"
3. Gorillaz feat. De La Soul – "Feel Good Inc."
4. Franz Ferdinand – "Do You Want To"
5. End of Fashion – "O Yeah"
6. Bloc Party – "Two More Years"
7. The Chemical Brothers – "Believe"
8. Josh Pyke – "Middle of the Hill"
9. Martha Wainwright – "Bloody Mother Fucking Asshole"
10. The Dandy Warhols – "All the Money or the Simple Life Honey"
11. After the Fall – "Concrete Boots"
12. Ween – "Gabrielle"
13. Butterfingers – "Figjam"
14. Cog – "My Enemy"
15. Sarah Blasko – "Flame Trees"
16. The Beautiful Girls – "Ashes"
17. Beck – "Girl"
18. The Strokes – "Juicebox"
19. The Living End – "What's on Your Radio"
20. Kisschasy – "Do-Do's and Whoa-oh's"
21. The Herd – "I Was Only 19 (Live)"
**CD 2**
1. Ben Lee – "Catch My Disease"
2. Kanye West feat. Jamie Foxx – "Gold Digger"
3. Datarock – "Computer Camp Love"
4. Kaiser Chiefs – "Everyday I Love You Less and Less"
5. Queens of the Stone Age – "Little Sister"
6. Faker – "Hurricane"
7. The Mountain Goats – "This Year"
8. Clare Bowditch and the Feeding Set – "Divorcee By 23"
9. The Bravery – "An Honest Mistake"
10. System of a Down – "B.Y.O.B."
11. Gyroscope – "Fast Girl"
12. The Cat Empire – "The Car Song"
13. Babyshambles – "Fuck Forever"
14. Bright Eyes – "First Day of My Life"
15. Emiliana Torrini – "Sunnyroad"
16. Architecture in Helsinki – "It's 5!"
17. Bloodhound Gang – "Foxtrot Uniform Charlie Kilo"
18. Foo Fighters – "DOA"
19. The Butterfly Effect – "Phoenix"
20. Wolfmother – "Mind's Eye (Live)"

=== DVD Release ===
1. Bernard Fanning – "Wish You Well"
2. Wolfmother – "Mind's Eye"
3. Gorillaz feat. De La Soul – "Feel Good Inc."
4. Franz Ferdinand – "Do You Want To"
5. End of Fashion – "O Yeah"
6. Bloc Party – "Two More Years"
7. The Chemical Brothers – "Believe"
8. Josh Pyke – "Middle of the Hill"
9. The Dandy Warhols – "All the Money or the Simple Life Honey"
10. After the Fall – "Concrete Boots"
11. Butterfingers – "Figjam"
12. Cog – "My Enemy"
13. The Beautiful Girls – "Ashes"
14. Beck – "Girl"
15. The Strokes – "Juicebox" (Directors Cut)
16. The Living End – "What's on Your Radio"
17. Kisschasy – "Do-Do's and Whoa-oh's"
18. Ben Lee – "Catch My Disease"
19. Datarock – "Computer Camp Love"
20. Kaiser Chiefs – "Everyday I Love You Less and Less"
21. Queens of the Stone Age – "Little Sister"
22. Faker – "Hurricane"
23. The Mountain Goats – "This Year"
24. Clare Bowditch and the Feeding Set – "Divorcee By 23"
25. The Bravery – "An Honest Mistake"
26. System of a Down – "B.Y.O.B."
27. Gyroscope – "Fast Girl"
28. The Cat Empire – "The Car Song"
29. Babyshambles – "Fuck Forever"
30. Bright Eyes – "First Day of My Life"
31. Emiliana Torrini – "Sunnyroad"
32. Architecture in Helsinki – "It's 5!"
33. Bloodhound Gang – "Foxtrot Uniform Charlie Kilo"
34. Foo Fighters – "DOA"
35. The Butterfly Effect – "Phoenix"
36. The Bedroom Philosopher – "I'm So Post Modern"
37. Grinspoon – "Sweet as Sugar"
38. Scissor Sisters – "Filthy/Gorgeous"
39. Karnivool – "Themata"
40. Epicure – "Tightrope Walker"
