= The Chariot (song) =

Single by The Cat Empire

from the album The Cat Empire
- B-side: "The Lost Song"; "The Rhythm"; "Excerpts from Jazz Sessions"; "The Chariot Dub Section"
- Released: May 2004
- Recorded: 2003
- Genre: Ska; jazz; dub
- Length: 5:34 (Album version); 3:59 (Single edit)
- Label: EMI/Virgin
- Songwriter(s): Felix Riebl

The Cat Empire singles chronology
"Days Like These" (2004)	"The Chariot" (2004)	"Sly" (2005)

"The Chariot" is a song by The Cat Empire. It was released in May 2004 as the third single from their 2003 debut album. "The Chariot" peaked at #34 in the Australian singles chart.

A promotional DVD featuring the song's music video was given to members of the official 'Street Team' in 2004.

== Track listing ==
All tracks are written by Felix Riebl, unless otherwise indicated

Australian CD single (Virgin – 5491732)
No.	Title	Writer(s)	Length
1.	"The Chariot" (single edit)		3:59
2.	"The Lost Song" (feat. Julie O'Hara)		6:17
3.	"The Rhythm" (feat. Richard Tedesco and Johnny Tedesco)	Felix Riebl, Harry Angus	6:11
4.	"Excerpts from Jazz Sessions" a) "The Rhythm solo (feat. Carlo Barbaro)" b) "How to Explain? solo section" c) "Nothing (feat. Julie O'Hara)"	Riebl, Angus	5:59
5.	"The Chariot Dub Section" (live at The Troccadero Surfers Paradise)		2:32
Total length:			24:58

- Tracks 2 & 3, Live at The Metro, Sydney.
- Track 4, Live at Bennetts Lane, Melbourne and Moulin Rouge, Sydney.
- Track 5, Live at The Troccadero, Surfers Paradise

== Charts ==
Chart (2004)	Peak position
Australia (ARIA)	34
