= Days Like These (The Cat Empire song) =

Single by the Cat Empire

from the album The Cat Empire
- B-side: "Days Loop"; "Wandering"; "Wanted to Write a Love Song"; "Manifesto"
- Released: February 2004
- Recorded: 2003
- Genre: Ska; alternative rock; reggae
- Length: 4:07 (Album version); 3:49 (Radio edit)
- Label: EMI/Virgin
- Songwriter(s): Felix Riebl, Harry James Angus, Ollie McGill

The Cat Empire singles chronology
"Hello" (2003)	"Days Like These" (2004)	"The Chariot" (2004)

"Days Like These" is a song by the Australian band the Cat Empire from their debut album, The Cat Empire (2003). It was released as a promotional single in Australia in 2003 before being released in February 2004 as the second single from the band's debut album and first commercial single in Australia, "Days Like These" peaked at #37 in the singles chart.

The song polled at number 37 in the Triple J Hottest 100, 2003.

== Track listing ==
All tracks are written by Felix Riebl, unless otherwise indicated

Australian CD (5539762)
No.	Title	Writer(s)	Length
1.	"Days Like These (radio edit)"	Felix Riebl, Harry Angus, Ollie McGill	3:49
2.	"Days Loop"		0:54
3.	"Wandering"		4:35
4.	"Wanted to Write a Love Song"		4:53
5.	"Manifesto / Rhythm Interlude"	Angus / Riebl, McGill	4:31
Total length:			18:42

Australian promo CD single (CDRP694)
No.	Title	Writer(s)	Length
1.	"Days Like These"	Riebl, Angus, McGill	3:44
Total length:			3:44

== Charts ==
Chart (2004)	Peak position
Australia (ARIA)	37
