= The Car Song =

Single by The Cat Empire

from the album Two Shoes
- B-side: "The Mother Place"; "The Return"; "Someday (Car Song Blues)"
- Released: June 2005
- Recorded: 2004
- Studio: EGREM Studios
- Genre: Indie
- Length: 4:20
- Label: EMI/Virgin
- Songwriter(s): Harry James Angus

The Cat Empire singles chronology
"Sly" (2005)	"The Car Song" (2005)	"Two Shoes" (2005)

"The Car Song" is a song by Australian band The Cat Empire. it was released in June 2005 as the second single from the band's second studio album, Two Shoes. The single peaked at #46 in the Australian singles chart.

In the song, Harry James Angus narrates his experiences as a struggling student who everyone insisted was "going to be a lawyer some day". However, rather than study or concentrate on an exam, all he could think about was playing music, playing basketball, or asking a childhood crush out on a date. In the latter part of the song, he meets one of his highschool acquaintances, who has indeed become a lawyer, and is now going out with the same girl. It was rated number 25 on the Triple J Hottest 100 of 2005. It was also featured as the opening and closing theme for 'The Wrong Way Home with Akmal, Cal and Ed' on Nova 100 in 2008.

The Ben Quinn directed music video was nominated for Best Video at the ARIA Music Awards of 2005.

== Music video ==
The music video features the members of the band competing in a basketball match (the "Guilt Resolution Cup") against people from Harry James Angus' "sordid past". Sigmund Freud is the team's coach. At the end of the game, Angus fails to score a critical basket, and the Cat Empire loses the game.

It was filmed at Victoria University's Footscray Park campus, with fans of the band used as extras.

== Track listing ==
Australian CD single (0946 3 32073 2 5)
No.	Title	Writer(s)	Length
1.	"The Car Song"	Harry Angus	04:20
2.	"The Mother Place"	Felix Riebl	04:29
3.	"The Return"	Riebl	04:07
4.	"Someday (Car Song Blues)"	Angus	04:44
Total length:			17:40

== Charts ==
Chart (2005)	Peak position
Australia (ARIA)	46
