= Hello (The Cat Empire song) =

Single by The Cat Empire

from the album The Cat Empire
- B-side: "East"; "The Chariot"
- Released: 2003
- Recorded: 2003
- Genre: Ska; jazz
- Length: 3:44
- Label: EMI/Virgin
- Songwriter: Felix Riebl

The Cat Empire singles chronology
"Hello" (2003)	"Days Like These" (2004)

Music video
- "Hello" on YouTube

"Hello" is a song by The Cat Empire. It was released in New Zealand in 2003 as the lead single from their debut studio album, The Cat Empire. It is credited as exposing the band to a more mainstream audience and allowing them to enhance their following.

The song polled at number 6 in the Triple J Hottest 100, 2003 and in 2025, the song placed 79 on the Triple J Hottest 100 of Australian Songs.

== Track listing ==
All tracks are written by Felix Riebl.

NZ CD single (5539722)
No.	Title	Length
1.	"Hello"	3:44
2.	"East"	3:53
3.	"The Chariot (live version)"	7:41
4.	"Hello (extended version)"	4:44
Total length:		20:02

Australian promo CD single (PR344)
No.	Title	Length
1.	"Hello"	3:44
Total length:		3:44

== Other uses in media ==
- The advertisement for the "Australian Idol" 2026 uses the song with contestants singing it.
- Samples of "Hello" have been used in the promos and advertising of the Network Ten TV program The 7PM Project.
- This is the official theme of "Musa da Beleza Interior" (Muse of Inner Beauty), one current sketch of the Brazilian TV program "Pânico na TV".
- In 2011, Pittsburgh Steelers wide receiver Hines Ward and partner Kym Johnson danced to Hello on Dancing with the Stars.
- The song was used in the 2008 Disney movie Beverly Hills Chihuahua.

== Charts ==
Chart (2003–04)	Peak position
New Zealand (Recorded Music NZ)	12
