= The Cat Empire (album) =

Studio album by the Cat Empire
- Released: 24 October 2003
- Recorded: 2003 (Sing Sing Studios, Melbourne; Metropolis Audio, Melbourne; Byron Bay Nut Farm, Byron Bay)
- Genres: Alternative rock, jazz, ska, reggae
- Length: 55:07
- Label: Virgin
- Producers: Andy Baldwin, The Cat Empire

The Cat Empire chronology
The Cat Empire (2003)	Two Shoes (2005)

Singles from The Cat Empire
- 1. "Hello" Released: October 2003; 2. "Days Like These" Released: 9 February 2004; 3. "The Chariot" Released: 10 May 2004; 4. "One, Four, Five" Released: 2004

The Cat Empire is the debut studio album of Australian jazz and funk band The Cat Empire, which was released on 24 October 2003. It peaked at No. 15 on the ARIA Albums Chart and was certified 2× platinum by ARIA in 2005. Four singles were issued from the album, "Hello" (October 2003), "Days Like These" (February 2004), "The Chariot" (May 2004) and "One, Four, Five" (2004). At the ARIA Music Awards of 2004, the band received six nominations including Best Group, Best Breakthrough Artist – Album and Best Urban Release for The Cat Empire; Engineer of the Year and Producer of the Year for Baldwin's work on the album.

== Recording ==
The Cat Empire recorded their eponymous debut studio album sporadically over seven months during 2003 with Andy Baldwin, co-producing, at studios in Melbourne and at Byron Bay. They recorded material in-between touring Australia, playing at the St Kilda Festival with Kate Ceberano (February 2003) and appearing at the Byron Bay Blues & Roots Festival (April). The band were nominated in two categories at the Australian Jazz Awards. The band successfully applied for an International Pathways grant from the Australia Council for the Arts.

The band were featured in BBC Four coverage of the 2003 WOMAD Festival. Their track "Two Shoes" was placed on high rotation on BBC Radio 1 in August 2003. The band's growing live and critical reputation put them in a great position to approach record companies for a record deal for their self-financed, self-titled debut album in the middle of 2003. The band signed a deal with EMI's Virgin Records subsidiary.

== Chart performance and live success ==
The first single from The Cat Empire, "Hello", was released in October 2003, its music video was Channel V's clip of the week ahead of one by Justin Timberlake. The single peaked at No. 12 on the New Zealand Singles Chart during January 2004. The album was issued on 24 October 2003, which peaked at No. 15 on the ARIA Albums Chart. National radio station, Triple J nominated it as their album of the week in November. The group appeared on Australian TV shows, Rove (Live) with Rove McManus and The Panel on Network Ten, which helped raise the album's profile. It was certified gold in Australia by ARIA by December 2003.

"Days Like These" was issued as the second single in February 2004, reaching the top 40 of the ARIA Singles Chart. Their debut album received platinum accreditation in that year, and was certified 2× platinum in the following year for shipment of 140,000 units. Their third single "The Chariot" debuted in the ARIA top 40 in May 2004.

"Hello" was listed at No. 6 on the Triple J Hottest 100, 2003, one of the biggest music polls in the world, with other singles, "Days Like These" at No. 37 and "The Chariot" at No. 100.

This album was released with the Copy Control protection system in some regions. Its fourth single, "One, Four, Five", appeared late in 2004. It was reviewed in March 2012 by The British Medical Journal's Ray Moynihan who felt the "little known gem" with its title giving "a simple reference to a common progression of chords, but, more deeply, it's a call to celebrate the power of music" had "lyrical musings seem whimsical, but they resonate through a small though growing evidence base."

At the ARIA Music Awards of 2004, the band received six nominations for Best Group, Best Breakthrough Artist – Album and Best Urban Release for The Cat Empire; Engineer of the Year for Andy Baldwin's work on the album, Producer of the Year for Baldwin and the group, and Best Breakthrough Artist – Single for "Days Like These" from this album.

== Track listing ==
All tracks are written by Felix Riebl, unless otherwise indicated

Australian version per Virgin Records
No.	Title	Writer(s)	Length
1.	"How to Explain?"		3:37
2.	"Days Like These"	Felix Riebl; Harry Angus; Ollie McGill	4:07
3.	"The Lost Song"		3:15
4.	"The Chariot"		5:34
5.	"Hello"		3:44
6.	"One, Four, Five"		3:24
7.	"The Rhythm"	Riebl; Angus	3:24
8.	"The Wine Song"	Angus	7:22
9.	"Nothing"		3:39
10.	"Beanni"		2:19
11.	"The Crowd"	Angus	5:13
12.	"Manifesto"	Angus	2:34
13.	"All That Talking"		6:54
Total length:			55:07

All tracks are written by Felix Riebl, unless otherwise indicated

European version per Universal Music Group
No.	Title	Writer(s)	Length
1.	"How to Explain?"		3:37
2.	"Days Like These"	Riebl; Angus; McGill	4:07
3.	"The Lost Song" (incorrectly listed as "The Last Song" on 'PR337' promotional release)		3:15
4.	"Beanni"		2:19
5.	"Hello"		3:44
6.	"One, Four, Five"		3:24
7.	"Feline"		2:36
8.	"The Rhythm"	Riebl; Angus	3:24
9.	"The Wine Song"	Angus	7:22
10.	"Nothing"		3:39
11.	"The Chariot"		5:34
12.	"The Crowd"	Angus	5:13
13.	"Manifesto"	Angus	2:34
14.	"All That Talking"		6:54
Total length:			57:43

== Releases ==
A different version of The Cat Empire was released in some European countries under the Universal Music Group. It adds the rare track, "Feline" (found on their live album, Touring Europe and the UK, 2004), as track 7, thereby renumbering the later tracks. "The Chariot" and "Beanni" trade places.

A promotional advance release of the album also exists (labelled 'PR337', pressed by Virgin Records), called Oct 2003 Album and was sent to reviewers before the album was released. It contains the same track listing as the European version. Another advance release exists, again, pressed by Virgin Records, and labelled 'PR343', which has the same track listing as the 'PR337' release, albeit with correct spelling of track 3 on the disc.

The tracks in the promotional release are all earlier, more 'raw' mixes and have subtle differences, yet they contribute greatly to the depth of each track. A few examples include extra background percussion throughout "How to Explain?", and different voice samples in "Days Like These" (for example, the "one two" sample, and Hull-Brown's Mexican voice).

== Personnel ==
The Cat Empire core members

- Harry James Angus – vocals, trumpet, slide guitar (track 11)
- Will Hull-Brown – drums
- Jamshid Khadiwhala – turntables, percussion
- Ollie McGill – piano, keyboard, electric piano, accordion, recorder (track 5), banjo (track 9)
- Ryan Monro – double bass, bass guitar
- Felix Riebl – lead vocals, percussion, panpipes (track 4)

The Empire Horns (auxiliary members)

- Carlo Barbaro – tenor saxophone (tracks 1, 4–6, 8, 11, 13)
- Kieran Conrau – trombone (tracks 1, 4–6, 8, 11, 13)
- Ross Irwin – trumpet (tracks 1, 4–6, 8, 11, 13)

Additional musicians

- Jan Skubiszewski – guitar (track 2)
- Clarence DaFunk – guitar (track 4)
- Sergio Ercole – guitar (track 7)
- Nasrine Rahmani – percussion (track 3)
- Luke Farrugia – tuba (track 8)
- Andy Baldwin – violin (track 8)
- Cezary Skubiszewski – vocals (track 6)
- Karishma Sadhai – vocals (track 11)

Recording details

- Engineer – Andy Baldwin
- Mastering – John Roberto
- Mixing – Andy Baldwin
  - Assistant mixer – Jimi Maroudas
- Producer – Andy Baldwin, The Cat Empire
- Recording – Andy Baldwin, Shae Mete, Carl Schubert, Jan Skubiszewski

== Charts ==
Chart (2003–05)	Peak position
Australian Albums (ARIA)	15

== Certifications ==
Region	Certification	Certified units/sales
Australia (ARIA)	3× Platinum	210,000^{^}
^{^} Shipments figures based on certification alone.
