= No Longer There =

Single by The Cat Empire

from the album So Many Nights
- B-side: "Africa Luck Song"; "Won't Be Afraid"; "No Longer There (Andy Bionic and Norman Pow! Remix)"
- Released: September 8, 2007
- Recorded: 2007
- Genre: Pop
- Length: 3:57 (Album version); 3:45 (Radio edit)
- Label: EMI/Virgin
- Songwriter(s): Felix Riebl

The Cat Empire singles chronology
"Down at the 303 (Live)" (2007)	"No Longer There" (2007)	"So Many Nights" (2007)

"No Longer There" is a song by Australian band, The Cat Empire, released in September 2007 as the lead single from the band's fourth album, So Many Nights. The single peaked at number 12 in the Australian singles chart.

The B-side "Africa Luck Song" is an instrumental of "Song for the Day" on the band's preceding album, Cities.

== Music video ==
Shot in various landscapes, it starts off with the band performing on a boat on a river; the band members are filmed from different angles whilst performing. Following a time lapse sequence (implying passage of time), Felix Riebl (the lead singer) jumps off the boat into a vast sandy desert. Initially, from a long camera shot, the large boat in the background for several seconds is seen, followed by the band members relaxing in a canoe lying on sand, with Harry James Angus playing trumpet whilst Riebl walks by. The next sequence shows Riebl commence singing as he continues to walk, passing by the other band members as they relax on a couch with bassist Ryan Monro resting on the sand next to the couch. In the last scene of the song, all the band members are performing once again, this time on the sand. In the last seconds of the song, the camera pans out and displays a barren planet Earth (devoid of water), with the (former) coastline of Australia clearly visible.

== Track listing ==
No.	Title	Writer(s)	Length
1.	"No Longer There"	Felix Riebl	3:47
2.	"Africa Luck Song"	Riebl, Ollie McGill	4:08
3.	"Won't Be Afraid"	Riebl, Harry Angus, McGill, Will Hull-Brown, Ryan Monro, Jamshid Khadiwala	4:11
4.	"No Longer There" (Andy Bionic & Norman Pow! Remix)	Riebl	4:10
Total length:			16:16

== Charts ==
Chart (2007)	Peak position
Australia (ARIA)	12
