= Two Shoes (song) =

Single by The Cat Empire

from the album Two Shoes
- B-side: "Rhyme & Reason"; "Sol y Sombra"
- Released: 2005
- Recorded: 2004
- Studio: EGREM Studios
- Genre: Ska; jazz
- Length: 5:13 (Album version); 3:50 (Radio edit)
- Label: EMI/Virgin
- Songwriter(s): Felix Riebl
- Producer(s): Jerry Boys

The Cat Empire singles chronology
"The Car Song" (2005)	"Two Shoes" (2005)	"Down at the 303 (Live)" (2007)

"Two Shoes" is a song by Australian band The Cat Empire. it was released in 2005 as the third and final single from the band's second studio album, Two Shoes.

== Music video ==
The video was shot in the city of Melbourne over a period of three days. The video clip starts off with Felix Riebl walking down a pathway, followed by snippets of video on other people.

== Track listing ==
All tracks are written by Felix Riebl, unless otherwise indicated

Australian CD single
No.	Title	Writer(s)	Length
1.	"Two Shoes" (radio edit)		3:50
2.	"Rhyme and Reason"		5:33
3.	"Sol y Sombra" (extended)	Felix Riebl, Harry Angus, Ollie McGill, Ryan Monro	9:08
Total length:			18:31

== Charts ==
Chart (2005)	Peak position
ARIA Albums Chart	77
