= Two Shoes =

Studio album by the Cat Empire
- Released: 19 April 2005
- Recorded: November–December 2004
- Studio: EGREM Studios
- Genre: Latin; ska; jazz
- Length: 58:50
- Label: Virgin
- Producer: Jerry Boys; Felix Riebl; The Cat Empire

The Cat Empire chronology
The Cat Empire (2003)	Two Shoes (2005)	Cities (2006)

Singles from Two Shoes
- 1. "Sly" Released: 28 March 2005; 2. "The Car Song" Released: 20 June 2005; 3. "Two Shoes" Released: 28 August 2005

Two Shoes is the second studio album by Australian ska-jazz band the Cat Empire, which was issued on 19 April 2005. It is the follow-up to their successful self-titled debut album. It was recorded in November to December 2004 in Havana, Cuba. It débuted at the top of the ARIA Albums Chart and is the band's first number 1 album.

== Background ==
Australian ska-jazz group, the Cat Empire, released their second album, Two Shoes, on 19 April 2005. It was recorded in Havana, Cuba, at Egrem Studios, late in the previous year, with production by the Cat Empire, Felix Riebl (percussion and vocals) and United Kingdom-based producer, Jerry Boys. It débuted at the top of the ARIA Albums Chart and is the band's first number 1 album, the second being Rising with the Sun. The tracks were more Latin in flavour, with a higher proportion written by Harry James Angus (trumpet and vocals) than on their self-titled debut album. The Australian version contains a hidden track, called "1001", which is coupled with the track, "The Night That Never End". Some later versions included songs that appeared on their debut album. The lead single, "Sly", was issued ahead of the album on 28 March, which reached the top 30. It appeared on EA Sports' FIFA 08 soundtrack. "The Car Song", written by Angus, was released as the second single in July, and peaked in the top 50.

== Reception ==
Professional ratings
Review scores
Source	Rating
Allmusic	3.5/5 stars
FasterLouder	(positive)
The Music Box	3/5 stars
IGN	8.6/10 stars

AllMusic's Jeff Tamarkin wrote, "Skipping merrily from alt-rock crunch to hip-hop beats, landing on reggae/ska, Latin jazz, and points in between, Two Shoes is clever and brainy, danceable and absorbing". Faster Louder described it as "an album that captures the band’s contagious energy and party spirit", and "fun, sexy and moving at the same time".

John Metzger of the Music Box stated that, while the album "lyrically [...] falters as the Cat Empire attempt to straddle the line between lighthearted and serious concepts, [...] its youthful ruminations matter little as the Cat Empire’s exuberant energy and giddily resplendent music are enough to make Two Shoes a captivating endeavor that surely will defeat even the worst cases of the winter blues."

On Rolling Stone's 2022 and 2023 lists of the 200 Greatest Australian Albums of All Time, Two Shoes came in at No. 150. Britanny Jenke dubbed the album an "instant classic that felt representative of experiencing the group on the live stage" in her review, and stated that it proves "the Cat Empire hadn’t lucked out with their debut, they were just a music-making machine who had only begun to hit their stride".

== Track listing ==
All tracks are written by Felix Riebl, unless otherwise indicated.

Australian version
No.	Title	Writer(s)	Length
1.	"Sly"		3:47
2.	"In My Pocket"	Harry Angus	5:04
3.	"Lullaby"		5:35
4.	"The Car Song"	Angus	4:19
5.	"Two Shoes"		5:13
6.	"Miserere"		6:39
7.	"Sol y Sombra"	Riebl; Angus; Ollie McGill; Ryan Monro	6:02
8.	"Party Started"	Riebl; Angus; McGill	3:46
9.	"Protons, Neutrons, Electrons"	Angus	4:44
10.	"Saltwater"	Angus	4:06
11.	"The Night That Never End"	Riebl; McGill	5:35
12.	"1001" (Hidden track - starts at 5:35 of "The Night That Never End")		4:00
Total length:			58:50

Special Edition Bonus DVD

1. Documentary - "Estudio 101: The Making of Two Shoes"
2. Live at The Forum - "Lullaby" and "The Car Song"
3. Music Videos - "Sly", "The Car Song" and "Two Shoes"
4. The Making of "Two Shoes" Music Video.

Indica Records special edition
No.	Title	Writer(s)	Length
1.	"Sly"		3:47
2.	"In My Pocket"	Angus	5:04
3.	"Lullaby"		5:35
4.	"The Car Song"	Angus	4:19
5.	"Two Shoes"		5:13
6.	"The Chariot" (Havana version)		5:07
7.	"Sol y Sombra"	Riebl; Angus; McGill; Monro	6:02
8.	"Party Started"	Riebl; Angus; McGill	3:46
9.	"Protons, Neutrons, Electrons"	Angus	4:44
10.	"Hello"		3:44
11.	"How to Explain?"		3:37
12.	"The Lost Song"		3:15
13.	"Days Like These"	Riebl; Angus; McGill	4:07
14.	"The Rhythm"	Riebl; Angus	3:24
15.	"The Wine Song"	Angus	7:22
Total length:			69:06

Indica Records Bonus DVD

1. Live at The Forum - "Lullaby" and "The Car Song"
2. Woodford Folk Festival - "Sly" and "How to Explain?"
3. From On the Attack - "The Lost Song", "The Rhythm", and DVD 'encore' videos - "Dancers" and "L'Hotel de Californie".
4. Music videos - "Hello", "The Chariot", "The Car Song" and "Two Shoes".

International version
No.	Title	Writer(s)	Length
1.	"How to Explain"		3:37
2.	"Hello"		3:51
3.	"The Lost Song"		3:20
4.	"Days Like These"	Riebl; Angus; McGill	4:09
5.	"The Rhythm"	Riebl; Angus	3:26
6.	"Sly"		3:54
7.	"In My Pocket"	Angus	5:07
8.	"Lullaby"		5:02
9.	"The Car Song"	Angus	4:22
10.	"Two Shoes"		5:17
11.	"The Chariot"		5:07
12.	"Sol y Sombra"	Riebl; Angus; McGill; Monro	6:05
13.	"Party Started"	Riebl; Angus; McGill	3:48
14.	"Protons, Neutrons, Electrons"	Angus	4:47
15.	"The Wine Song"	Angus	7:22
Total length:			69:06

== Personnel ==
The Cat Empire core members

- Harry James Angus – vocals, trumpet, recorder, resonator
- Will Hull-Brown – drums, shouts
- Jamshid Khadiwhala – turntables, tambourine, clave, shouts
- Ollie McGill – piano, keyboard, recorder, tubular bells, backing vocals
- Ryan Monro – double bass, bass guitar, backing vocals
- Felix Riebl – lead vocals, percussion

The Empire Horns (auxiliary members)

- Kieran Conrau – trombone (track 6)
- Ross Irwin – trumpet (track 6)

Additional musicians

- Jesús "Aguaje" Ramos – trombone (tracks 1–5, 7–8)
- Yaure Muniz – trumpet (tracks 1–5, 7)
- Javier R Zalba Suarez – baritone saxophone (tracks 1–4, 7)
- Georgina Cameron – violin (track 6)
- Alyssa Conrau – violin (track 6)
- Kristy Conrau – cello (track 6)
- Max Riebl – soprano vocals (track 6), solo trumpet (track 6)
- Jorge Yoandi Moline – congas (track 7)
- Arnado Valdes Perez – timbales (track 7)
- Maritza Montero – backing vocals (tracks 2, 6, 11)
- Idania Valdes – backing vocals (tracks 2, 6)
- Virgilio Valdes – backing vocals (track 6)

Recording details

- Produced by – Jerry Boys, Felix Riebl, The Cat Empire
- Recording – Jerry Boys, Adam Rhodes (strings and brass on Miserere, 1001 only)
- Editing – John Mallison, Donald Clarke
- Assistant engineering – John Mallison, Donald Clarke
- Studio assistant – Isel Martinez
- Mixing – Jerry Boys, Rafe McKenna, Adam Rhodes (Miserere, 1001 only)
  - Assistant mixer – Luke Postil, Leigh C Williams
- Mastered by – Tom Leader

== Charts ==
Chart (2005)	Peak position
Australian Albums (ARIA)	1

== Certifications ==
Region	Certification	Certified units/sales
Australia (ARIA)	Platinum	70,000^{^}
^{^} Shipments figures based on certification alone.
