= Sly (The Cat Empire song) =

2005 single by the Cat Empire

Single by the Cat Empire

from the album Two Shoes
- B-side: "1001"; "No Sense"; "Swing Sly"
- Released: 28 March 2005
- Studio: EGREM
- Length: 3:47
- Label: EMI
- Songwriter: Felix Riebl
- Producers: The Cat Empire; Jerry Boys; Felix Riebl

The Cat Empire singles chronology
"The Chariot" (2004)	"Sly" (2005)	"The Car Song" (2005)

"Sly" is a song by Australian rock band the Cat Empire that was the first single released from their 2005 album, Two Shoes. The song peaked at number 23 on the Australian Singles Chart and placed at number 38 in the Triple J Hottest 100, 2005.

== Track listing ==
All tracks are written by Felix Riebl, except where noted.

Australian CD single
No.	Title	Writer(s)	Length
1.	"Sly" (radio edit)		3:47
2.	"1001"	Ryan Monro, Felix Riebl, Oliver McGill	5:11
3.	"No Sense"		6:46
4.	"Swing Sly"		4:39
Total length:			20:23

== Charts ==
Chart (2005–2007)	Peak position
Australia (ARIA)	23
US Adult Alternative Airplay (Billboard)	18
