= ABC Kinglake Ranges =

Temporary radio station in Kinglake, Victoria

Temporary radio station in Kinglake, Victoria

Kinglake, Victoria; Australia
- Broadcast area: Shire of Murrindindi
- Frequency: 97.1 MHz FM
- Branding: 97.1 ABC Kinglake Ranges

Programming
- Format: Local news, talk and music
- Affiliations: ABC Local Radio

Ownership
- Owner: Australian Broadcasting Corporation

History
- First air date: 9 March 2009
- Last air date: July 2009

Technical information
- Translator: 97.3 MHz FM Flowerdale

Links
- Website: www.abc.net.au

ABC Kinglake Ranges was a temporary radio service broadcasting from Kinglake, Victoria, Australia, to areas in the Shire of Murrindindi affected by the Black Saturday bushfires of 2009. The station was first broadcast on 9 March 2009, initially from a makeshift transmitter on 97.1FM. Coverage extended to the towns of Flowerdale and Hazeldene through the local repeater of the Wodonga-based ABC Goulburn Murray service.

The station broadcast a local breakfast program, presented from the studios of 774 ABC Melbourne by Louise Fitzroy. A mornings program was presented from temporary studios in Kinglake by Simon Rogers, with additional community-focused programming and simulcasts of national programming from ABC Local Radio.

In July 2009, the service ceased broadcasting after five months on air. Alexandra-based UGFM commenced operation of a permanent community radio station on 94.5FM in Kinglake from 6 September 2009.

== See also ==
- Reactions to the Black Saturday bushfire crisis
- Community radio
