= Reactions to the Black Saturday bushfire crisis =

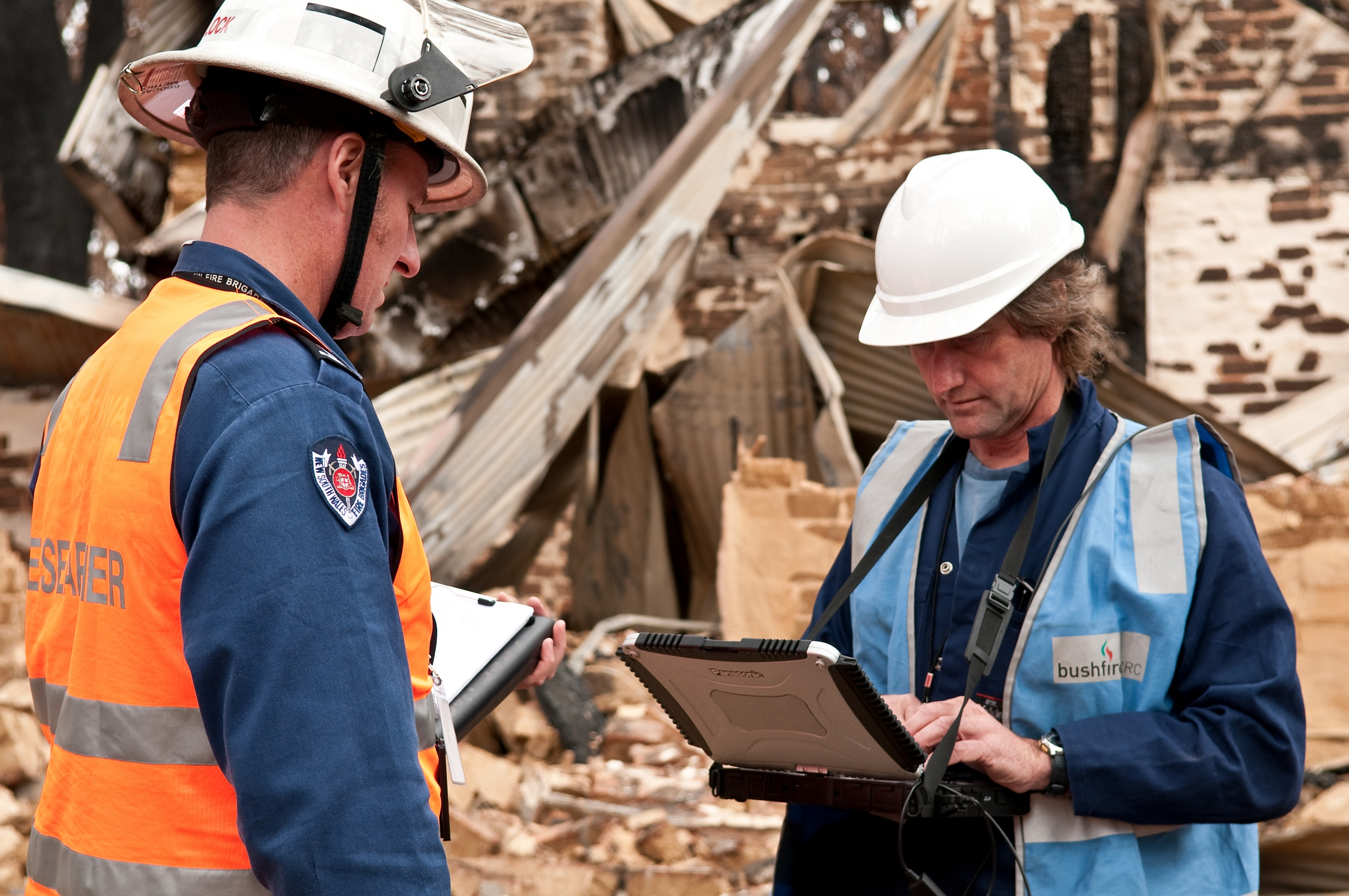
CSIRO conducting bushfire research at Kinglake after the Black Saturday bushfires

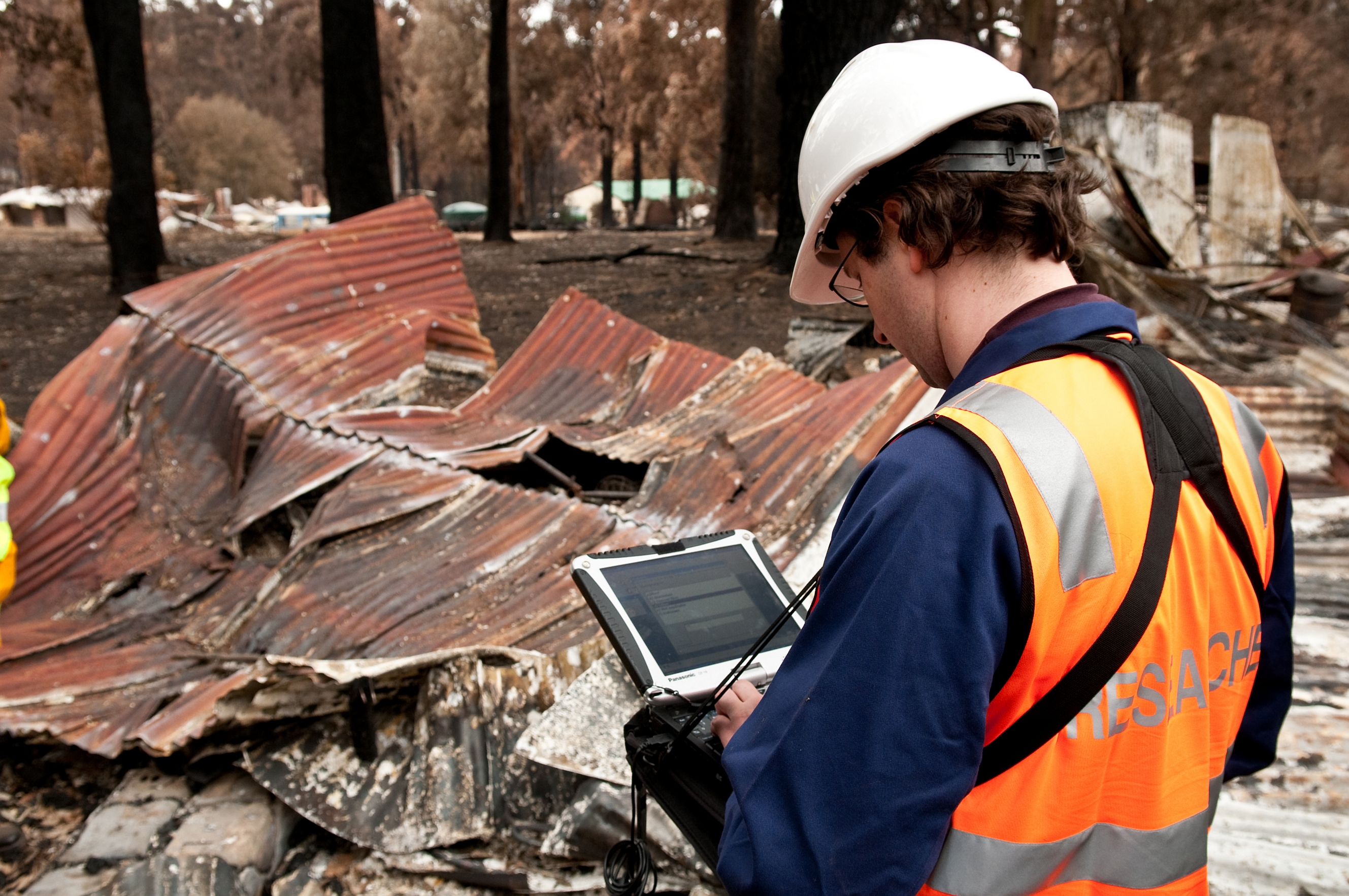
CSIRO conducting bushfire research at Kinglake after the Black Saturday bushfires

The Black Saturday bushfires were a series of fires that ignited across the Australian state of Victoria during extreme weather conditions on 7 February 2009. Burning around 450,000 ha for over a month, the fires destroyed over 2,100 homes, destroyed several regional towns and were fought by over 5,000 firefighting personnel. The Fires devastated many.

Responses to the Black Saturday bushfires included immediate community response, donations, and, later, international aid efforts, Government inquiries (including a Royal Commission), and recommendations and discussions from a wide variety of bodies, organisations, authorities and communities.

== Government ==
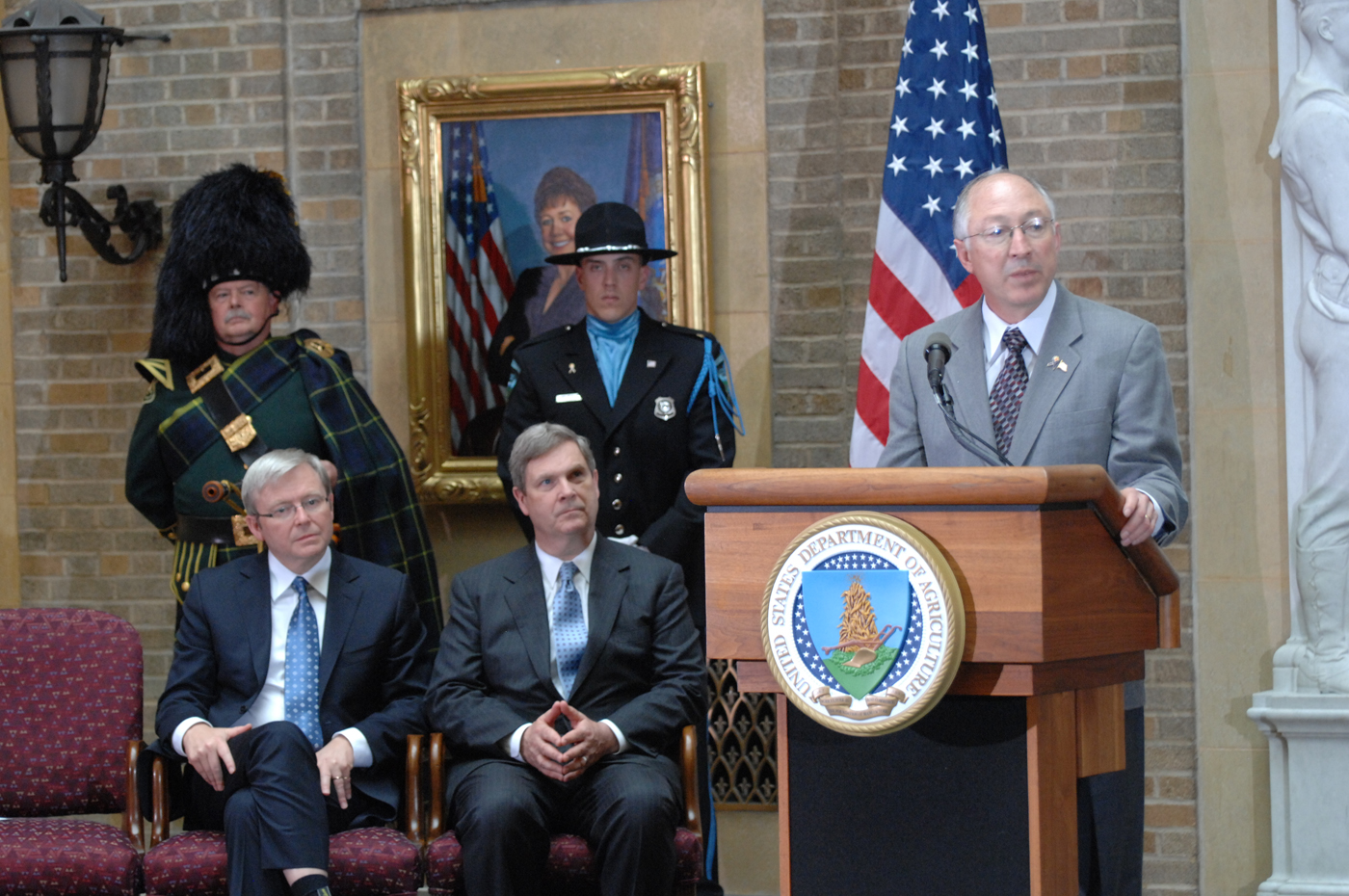
United States Secretary of the Interior Ken Salazar joined United States Secretary of Agriculture Tom Vilsack at a ceremony where Australian Prime Minister Kevin Rudd thanked United States wildland firefighters for their assistance

Federal parliament was suspended due to the emergency. The Premier of Victoria, John Brumby, accepted an offer from the Prime Minister, Kevin Rudd, to dispatch members of the Australian Defence Force to provide assistance in that state. Rudd described the bushfires as an "appalling tragedy for Victoria," saying "Hell and all its fury has visited the good people of Victoria in the last 24 hours."

Queen Elizabeth II made a donation to the Australian Red Cross Victorian Bushfire Fund, and stated that she "was shocked and saddened to learn of the terrible toll being exacted by the fires this weekend," and sent "heartfelt condolences to the families of all those who have died and... deep sympathy to the many that have lost their homes in this disaster," as well as expressing admiration for the firefighters and other emergency personnel. Similarly, Prince Charles, stated at a reception he hosted for the Royal Flying Doctor Service of Australia: "Both my wife and I were so horrified along with so many other people in this country by the extent of the bush fires because I know every year Australia suffers from dreadful events, but this year somehow it's even more dreadful... We just wanted people to know how deeply we feel for all those families who have suffered so terribly... The sheer extent of the horrors is hard to comprehend I think to people who don't live in Australia or know Australia." It was then announced on 18 February that Princess Anne would represent the Queen at a memorial service to be held in the Rod Laver Arena in Melbourne, and to tour some of the areas affected by the fires.

The Greens leader Bob Brown told Sky News, that "[the fires] are a sobering reminder of the need for [Australia] and the whole world to act and put at a priority the need to tackle climate change," and Chief Commissioner of the Victoria Police, Christine Nixon, who was due to retire in March 2009, announced on 10 February that she would be stepping down early in order to lead a state government committee charged with rebuilding the fire-affected areas.

== Firefighting ==
More than 4,000 firefighters from the Country Fire Authority (CFA) – which is primarily responsible for fires on private property – and the Department of Sustainability and Environment (DSE) – primarily responsible for fires on public land – have worked to battle the fires. These groups were assisted by the military aid offered by the Commonwealth Governor-in-Council, and the firefighters sent not only by the states of NSW, South Australia, ACT, Tasmania, and Western Australia, but also from firefighting personnel from New Zealand, the latter being limited in number by the extreme fire risk that was concurrent in parts of New Zealand.

Seventy-four firefighters from agencies in the United States travelled to Victoria and assisted in firefighting efforts.

The Metropolitan Fire Brigade (MFB) who are primarily responsible for fires and other emergencies in the Melbourne metropolitan area, also sent firefighters and support staff to aid in the effort.

== Aid efforts ==
Humanitarian responses to the fires came quickly from government, businesses, individuals and aid agencies, including direct relief efforts as well as fundraising.

The Victorian Government's Department of Human Services offered immediate assistance of up to $1,067 for affected people. The federal government announced a $10 million package of emergency assistance, available from 9 February, providing $1,000 per adult and $400 per child for those who had been hospitalised with injuries or who had lost their homes.

The bushfire appeal raised more than $372 million in total. The appeal by the Australian Red Cross raised over $315 million. The Red Cross Blood Service received 6,000 offers of blood donations on the morning of 9 February alone. The Salvation Army appeal raised $17.5 million.

Major banks National Australia Bank, ANZ, the Commonwealth Bank and Westpac each announced $1 million in donations for fire victims. Telstra, Australia's largest telecommunications company, donated $500,000 and pledged to match employee donations to the value of $250,000, bringing the total to over $1 million. Telstra also provided free telephone diversions to those affected and offered free local and mobile calls on selected public phone boxes in bushfire areas. Tabcorp donated $2 million.

BP donated $635,000 to the Red Cross Bushfire Appeal, along with donations from employees to be matched from the BP Foundation. BP has offered free food and drinks to emergency service personnel. Caltex donated $200,000 to be distributed as either cash or fuel. Caltex also stated that they will match dollar for dollar, all contributions to the Red Cross Bushfire Appeal made by Caltex employees.

The Woolworths conglomerate donated $1 million. Wesfarmers donated $500,000. Their supermarket division, Coles, donated profits from all stores on Friday 13 February while Kmart, their discount department store chain, donated $100,000 to The Salvation Army.

Cricket Australia used a match scheduled for 10 February between Australia and New Zealand to raise money for fire victims. Sydney Cricket Ground Trust and Cricket NSW raised money from a Twenty20 Cricket match at the SCG between the Waugh XI and the Taylor XI. The Australian Football League moved the NAB Cup match on 13 February between Essendon Bombers and Western Bulldogs from Darwin to Melbourne as a bushfire appeal match. V8 Supercars Australia donated $100,000 and the use of their main transporter as a communications centre and command post for the duration of the crisis. Football Federation Australia donated $100,000 to the Red Cross Bushfire Appeal and will provide replacement football (soccer) equipment to Victorian schools and junior clubs affected by the disaster.

On 12 February, the Nine Network held a telethon to benefit the victims of the bushfires, through the Australian Red Cross. Titled Australia Unites: The Victorian Bushfire Appeal, the event was hosted by Nine Network personality Eddie McGuire, and accompanied by many celebrities, athletes and entertainers, raising about A$20.5 million.

On 14 March, a charity concert Sound Relief was held simultaneously in Melbourne and Sydney with ticket sales exceeding $8.8 million. Some funds also went to aid those affected by floods in Queensland.

Some victims of the Queensland floods that had occurred around the same time (the worst floods in the history of north Queensland) who had received government support donated their grants to the Victorian bushfire appeal, saying that "we're not as bad off as the poor people of Victoria".

=== Aid for injured wildlife ===
As a result of the bushfires, many hundreds of burnt animals required care in wildlife centres across Victoria. Additionally, six wildlife care centres were destroyed by the bushfires. requested help to treat and feed the animals through the Bushfire Appeal. Wildlife Victoria and the National Parks and Wildlife Service also requested donations be made for burnt and injured wildlife.

=== Aid for local business ===
CFA Australia has provided over 120 accountants to assist with business recovery efforts. Working through Small Business Victoria, they will help to reconstruct lost financial records and re-establish businesses in communities affected by the bushfires.

== Media and community action ==
Australian national flags were lowered to half-mast in remembrance of the victims, and members of the Australian parliament gave speeches and observed a moment of silence, while Roman Catholic Archbishop Philip Wilson of Adelaide pledged that Saint Vincent de Paul and other Catholic aid organisations would offer assistance, and offered prayers and condolences on behalf of the Australian Catholic conference of bishops. Pope Benedict XVI, through his Cardinal Secretary of State, Tarcisio Bertone, offered assistance and assurance of prayers and spiritual support to the Governor General.

During the night of 7 February, the Nine Network showed a 15-minute bulletin at 9pm just on the fire situation and the Seven Network interrupted programming to produce a special news bulletin. From 7 February onwards, all major Australian television channels increased their nightly bulletin times to cover the fires more extensively. ABC Local Radio in Victoria postponed programs to relay up to the minute news of the fires from 7 February, and in March established the temporary station ABC Kinglake Ranges to provide local news and information to the surrounding areas affected by the fires.

The Australian Broadcasting Corporation set up a message board where people could offer or request help, which was inundated with replies. Similarly, several organisations and individuals used the microblogging service Twitter to post updates on the developing situation, using a conversion of the Country Fire Authority's RSS stream and the local emergency radio station.

The Yellow Ribbon has become a symbol of support for the emergency services involved in the disaster.

On 2 March, in anticipation and to create awareness of the extreme bushfire weather conditions predicted for the following days, many residents around Victoria received a text message that read: Msg from Vic Police:Extreme weather in Vic expected Mon night & Tues.High wind & fire risk. Listen to local ABC Radio for emergency updates. Do not reply to this. The message was sent to around 5 million phones throughout Victoria and Tasmania.

== International reaction ==
Following the Black Saturday bushfires, the Australian government received offers of assistance and condolences from a number of foreign heads of state, heads of government, and other leaders. The following is a summary of the response from various countries:

Country	Response
Bulgaria	The Prime Minister of Bulgaria, Sergei Stanishev, sent a letter to his Australian counterpart, Kevin Rudd, expressing his country's sympathies, and added that Bulgaria was ready to send humanitarian aid to Australia "in these difficult times for the Australian people."
Canada	Lawrence Cannon, the Canadian Minister of Foreign Affairs, issued a statement expressing the Canadian government's sympathies to those affected by the bushfires, and nine wildfire specialists from British Columbia were sent to Victoria to help.
China	Chancellor of China Wen Jiabao sent a message of condolences to his Australian counterpart, Kevin Rudd.
Cyprus	President of Cyprus Demetris Christofias signed a book of condolences at the Australian mission in Nicosia, to "express our condolences, sorrow and our solidarity for the loss of so many people and of course for the suffering caused by these large fires."
East Timor	"On behalf of the Timorese people, I would like to extend my deep condolences to our brothers and sisters of Australia, especially to those who have lost their loved ones and properties in this tragedy," said East Timorese President José Ramos-Horta in a statement, after delaying his official visit to Australia.
France	In a letter to Prime Minister Kevin Rudd, President Nicolas Sarkozy expressed his country's sympathy, and offered assistance from French resources in New Caledonia.
Germany	The Chancellor of Germany, Angela Merkel, sent a personal letter to Prime Minister Kevin Rudd, offering aid and support.
India	External Affairs Minister for India Pranab Mukherjee telephoned Australian Foreign Minister Stephen Smith to convey his "deep condolences and sympathies to the families of the deceased and victims of the bushfires in the State of Victoria," and offered to provide any necessary disaster relief.
Indonesia	President of Indonesia Susilo Bambang Yudhoyono sent a letter to Prime Minister Kevin Rudd expressing deep sympathy: "In the spirit of the Australia-Indonesia partnership, Australia's success is also Indonesia's success, and its misery is also Indonesia's misery." The President said he would send a police forensic team to help identify bushfire victims, and would also contribute US$1 million for the reconstruction of schools.
Iran	Iranian Foreign Minister Manouchehr Mottaki rang Stephen Smith to express "deep grief" over the fires.
Israel	Outgoing Israeli Prime Minister Ehud Olmert sent a letter to Kevin Rudd, stating: "I have been following with horror and disbelief the deadly wildfires raging in the Australian state of Victoria over the past few days, which claimed the lives of hundreds of innocent people and left thousands homeless and destitute."
Japan	Hirofumi Nakasone, the Japanese Foreign Minister, offered "any cooperation" necessary from the Japanese, in a letter to Foreign Minister Stephen Smith.
Lithuania	President of Lithuania Valdas Adamkus sent a condolence message to Australia's Governor-General, Quentin Bryce. "Today our thoughts are with the Australian firefighters, rescue teams, and all those who are battling the fires, risking their lives to save others."
New Zealand	John Key, Prime Minister of New Zealand, stated that "our relationship is like no other. At this time we stand shoulder to shoulder with you as you battle the blaze that will be marked forever in the history of your great nation"; he offered fire-fighting and police personnel and equipment. A specialist New Zealand firefighting helicopter and victim identification police specialists were sent to Australia, along with 100 firefighters, and the New Zealand government donated NZ$500,000 to victims of the disaster.
Norway	King Harald V of Norway sent condolences to Australia's Governor-General, Quentin Bryce. "I am deeply saddened by the news of the terrible wildfires that has ravaged parts of Australia, resulting in the tragic loss of so many lives and causing such widespread damage. On behalf of myself and the Norwegian people I send you my condolences, and ask you to convey my deepest sympathies to those bereaved and to others afflicted by this tragic disaster."
Papua New Guinea	The government of Papua New Guinea decided to donate A$2 million to assist disaster victims in the bushfires in Victoria and those who've been affected by flooding in north Queensland.
Portugal	President of Portugal Aníbal Cavaco Silva sent his condolences to Australia's Governor-General. "It was with profound grief that I took awareness of the devastating consequences of the fires in the South of Australia and in particular, the loss of human lives it caused." Cavaco then proceeded by adding: "In this hour of suffering, I wish to express to you, and to the families of the victims, in my own name and of the Portuguese people, our heartfelt mourning and our most sincere condolences."
Russia	President of Russia Dmitry Medvedev sent a telegram to Governor-General Quentin Bryce, expressing condolences. In October 2009, at the Royal Commission, the Russian Ambassador to Australia said that the Russian Government had offered the Australian Government two advanced Ilyushin Il-76 waterbombers to help put out the bushfires. The offer was forwarded to the Victorian authorities, but the DSE declined it due to the aircraft not being suitable for the conditions in Victoria and the time it would have taken for approval from aviation authorities. Ilyushin Il-76 waterbombers have the capacity to drop 42,000 litres of water in a single pass.
Singapore	Prime Minister of Singapore Lee Hsien Loong offered the use of a fleet of Super Puma Helicopters that were stationed in Oakey, Queensland.
Turkey	Turkish Prime Minister Recep Tayyip Erdoğan sent condolences, and Environment and Forestry Minister Veysel Eroğlu offered assistance.
United Kingdom	The Prime Minister of the United Kingdom, Gordon Brown, telephoned Prime Minister Kevin Rudd to offer sympathy and assistance in dealing with the bushfires.
United States	Barack Obama, President of the United States, telephoned Prime Minister Kevin Rudd to offer his condolences over the Victorian bushfires. More than 30 US Department of the Interior and US Forest Service wildland firefighters were deployed to Victoria, and the US has also offered the expertise of aviation managers, planning section chiefs, and specialists in emergency land rehabilitation.
Vatican City	Pope Benedict XVI sent his condolences, relayed by the Vatican Secretary of State, Cardinal Tarcisio Bertone, stating the Pope was "deeply saddened to learn of the tragic consequences of recent fires in the state of Victoria."

Other nations including Andorra, Brazil, Cuba, Ireland, Nauru, Solomon Islands, South Africa, Sweden, Ukraine and Uganda have sent messages of support, as have European Commission President José Manuel Barroso, and United Nations Secretary General Ban Ki-moon.

== Other emergency organisations' responses ==
=== St John Ambulance ===
St John Ambulance Australia were involved from two weeks before and many weeks after 'Black Saturday' providing emergency medical and first aid services to other emergency service personnel involved and local residents. St John Ambulance Australia also assisted with the injured from the fires.

St John volunteers were also sent by their various state commands to join the Victorian volunteers who were already assisting. These included:

- Over 50 members and two emergency management teams from South Australia
- Over 50 members including emergency management teams from NSW
- Five members to assist in manning the Victorian Headquarters from the Northern Territory

Multiple sites were set up across the bushfire-affected areas, mainly at fire-staging grounds where services could be provided to CFA firefighters and other personnel involved.

By 8 February, St John were operating 16 first aid posts and were represented at the Integrated Fire Coordination Centre and three Incident Control Centres. Around 300 Victorian members were deployed. It was also the largest national deployment to a disaster in Australia by St John Ambulance. By the end of the event, more than 600 volunteer St John members had provided service during the bushfire disaster

=== Amateur radio ===
Amateur radio operators from the Victorian branch of the Wireless Institute Civil and Emergency Network (WICEN) were activated for the emergency and the aftermath until 10 March 2009, with assistance from other WICEN jurisdictions (NSW, ACT, SA), providing communications on amateur radio frequencies and also acting as radio operators for other agencies.
