= The Cat Empire =

Australian band

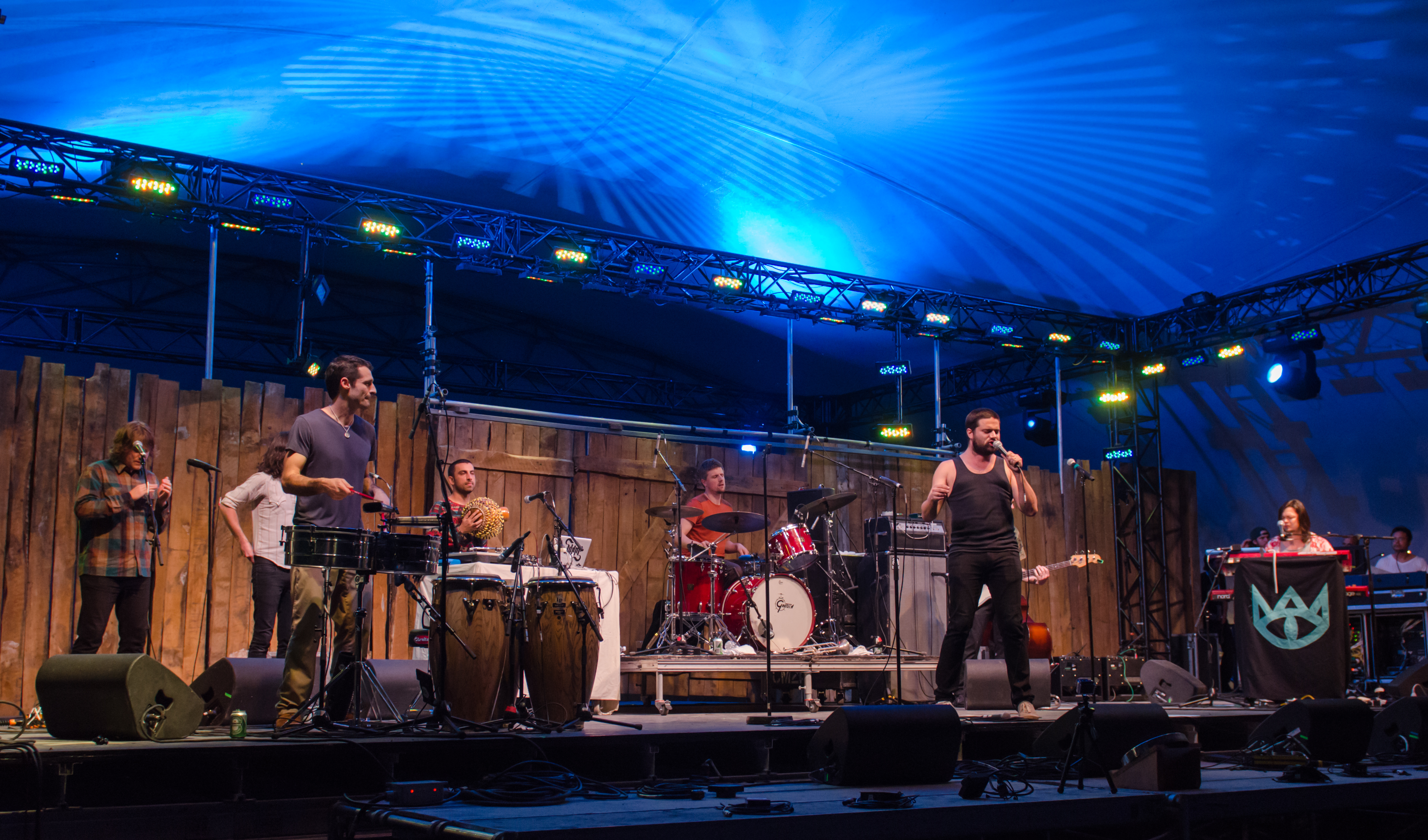
- The Cat Empire performing at the 2013 Winnipeg Folk Festival

Background information
- Origin: Melbourne, Victoria, Australia
- Genres: Latin; jazz; funk; ska; reggae; alternative rock
- Works: The Cat Empire discography
- Years active: 1999–present
- Labels: Two Shoes; EMI; Virgin; Indica; Velour; UMG
- Spinoffs: The Conglomerate; Jackson Jackson; The Genie
- Spinoff of: Jazz Cat
- Members: Ollie McGill; Felix Riebl; Roscoe James Irwin; Kieran Conrau; Grace Barbé; Daniel Farrugia; Lazaro Numa; Neda Rahmani
- Past members: Harry James Angus; Will Hull-Brown; Jamshid Khadiwhala; Ryan Monro
- Website: thecatempire.com

The Cat Empire is an Australian jazz and funk band, formed in Melbourne, Victoria, in 1999. For most of the band's duration, the core members were Felix Riebl (lead vocals, percussion), Harry James Angus (trumpet, vocals), Will Hull-Brown (drums), Jamshid "Jumps" Khadiwhala (turntables, percussion), Ollie McGill (keyboards, backing vocals) and Ryan Monro (bass, backing vocals). Monro retired from the band in March 2021, while Angus, Hull-Brown and Khadiwhala all left in April 2022. They are often supplemented by The Empire Horns, a brass duo composed of Ross Irwin (trumpet) and Kieran Conrau (trombone), among others. Their sound is a fusion of jazz, funk, ska, and rock with heavy Latin influences.

== History ==
=== 1999–2003: Beginnings ===
The Cat Empire's origins are traced back to Jazz Cat, a Melbourne-based band, led by Steve Sedergreen in 1999. Jazz Cat was a nine-piece group of players from different schools and backgrounds which debuted at the Manly Jazz Festival in Sydney. They gigged around Melbourne's jazz club scene, including at Dizzy's, where Sedergreen was a part-owner. Late that year, Jazz Cat spawned the Cat Empire, originally as a three-piece, with Ollie McGill on keyboards, Felix Riebl on percussion and vocals and Ryan Monro on double bass. The band's name was taken from the title of a drawing by Riebl's younger brother, Max, and its distinctive cat's eye icon, known as "Pablo", was created by Ian McGill, Ollie McGill's father. For a few months, both groups performed on alternate Thursdays at Dizzy's. They started playing a variety of gigs at other clubs, including Bennett's Lane. The band expanded in July 2001 by adding Harry James Angus on trumpet, Will Hull-Brown (ex-Jazz Cat) on drums and Jamshid "Jumps" Khadiwala as a DJ on turntables (later also on percussion).

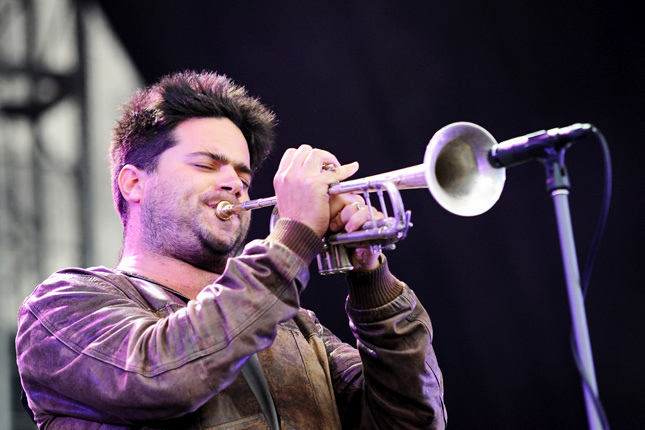
Harry James Angus, West Coast Blues & Roots Festival, April 2011

In late 2001, the band appeared in the Spiegeltent at the Melbourne Festival. By year's end, they had released an independent single, "Feline", in October, and a live six-track extended play, Live @ Adelphia, in December. In early 2002, the group played gigs at the Adelaide Festival of Arts, and in March, they headlined the Melbourne International Comedy Festival and St Kilda Film Festival. The ensemble commenced its first overseas tour on the West Coast of the United States, playing at The Matrix in San Francisco and at the Napa Valley Wine Auction in June. The band received a Music for the Future grant to fund the recording of a live album, The Sun, at Melbourne's Adelphia Studios. At the Edinburgh Festival, they played sixteen successive shows in the Late 'n' Live slot between 3 A.M. and 5 A.M. They performed at the 2002 Melbourne Festival and a series of local gigs; Kate Ceberano appeared as a guest vocalist at their final show for the year.

=== 2003–2005: Debut album ===
The Cat Empire recorded their debut studio album, The Cat Empire, in seven months during 2003 with producer Andy Baldwin in Melbourne. Between recording sessions they toured Australia, including appearing at the St Kilda Festival with Ceberano, and at the East Coast Blues & Roots Music Festival in April. The ensemble was nominated in two categories at the Australian Jazz Bell Awards. They successfully applied for an International Pathways grant from the Australia Council for the Arts. The band was featured on BBC Four performing at the 2003 WOMAD festival. The lead single, "Hello", was placed on high rotation on BBC Radio 1 in August. The group's growing live and critical reputation enabled them to approach record companies for a deal to issue the album in August. They signed with EMI and Virgin Records, and, in the UK, with an independent label.

=== 2005–2006: Two Shoes ===
The Cat Empire released their second album, Two Shoes, on 19 April 2005. It was recorded in Havana, Cuba, at Egrem Studios, late in 2004, with production by the Cat Empire, Riebl and Jerry Boys. It debuted at number 1 and until 2016 was their only album to reach the number-one position. The tracks were more Latin in flavour, with a higher proportion written by Angus than on the first album. AllMusic's Jeff Tamarkin wrote "Skipping merrily from alt-rock crunch to hip-hop beats, landing on reggae/ska, Latin jazz, and points in between, Two Shoes is clever and brainy, danceable and absorbing". The Australian version contains a hidden track, called "1001", which is coupled with the track, "The Night That Never End". The lead single, "Sly", was issued ahead of the album on 28 March and reached the top 30. The song appeared on EA Sports' FIFA 08 soundtrack. "The Car Song", written by Angus, was released as the second single in July, and peaked in the top 50.

In July, the band played two sets at the Cambridge Folk Festival. Later in the month, they performed a set on Sunday evening of Sheep Music. In October, Two Shoes Deluxe Edition DVD was released, which contained live footage of "Lullaby" and "The Car Song", a documentary on the making of the album in Cuba, the original video clips created for the album, and behind-the-scenes footage. The ensemble also featured on a Triple J CD entitled Like a Version, featuring cover versions of songs performed by artists on Mel Bampton's show, Mel in the Morning. Their track was a version of "Hotel California" (originally by the Eagles), sung in French by Angus. By the end of 2005, The Cat Empire achieved double platinum certificate and Two Shoes achieved platinum status.

=== 2006–2010: Cities to So Many Nights ===
In March 2006, the Cat Empire participated in the opening ceremony of the Melbourne Commonwealth Games, playing their own compositions for approximately an hour as the Games' athletes entered the stadium, introducing the group to an estimated worldwide audience of one billion. The band signed an American record deal with Velour Recordings, who released a modified version of the second Australian album, Two Shoes, which included some songs previously released on their debut.

On 1 April 2006, the group issued their third studio album, Cities (aka Cities: The Cat Empire Project) in Australia, which peaked at number 11. Described by the group as "between a tribute to our own city and an experiment in sounds that we've found abroad", a limited edition of 10,000 individually numbered copies were made available. At the ARIA Music Awards of 2006, they won the Best World Music Album category, and received a nomination for Engineer of the Year for Adam Rhodes' work on the album.

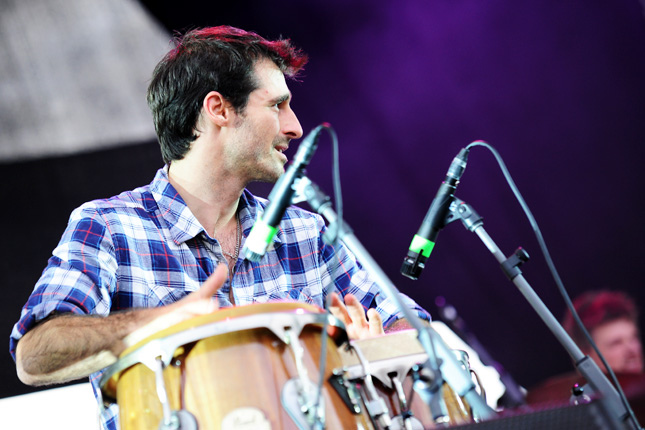
Felix Riebl, West Coast Blues & Roots Festival, April 2011

The band toured extensively over the year, visiting Asia, America and Europe and playing over 45 gigs in 12 countries.

The ensemble started 2007 with a busy touring schedule and US TV appearances, including the Late Show with David Letterman in February, followed by The Late Late Show with Craig Ferguson in March. Angus' side project, Jackson Jackson, released their first album, The Fire Is on the Bird, that month. In May, the Cat Empire performed on The Tonight Show with Jay Leno. In June, on the group's European tour, they appeared on the Avalon Stage at the Glastonbury Festival, where the mud was so deep that Riebl and Khadiwhala performed the "gumboot shuffle".

The Cat Empire released their fourth album, So Many Nights in Australia on 22 September 2007, it was produced by John Porter and reached number two. The lead single, "No Longer There", was issued two weeks earlier and peaked at number 12. "So Many Nights" was listed at number 50 on the Triple J Hottest 100 for 2007, while "No Longer There" finished at number 62.

In February 2008, the band concluded their Outdoor Australian Tour, with performances in Sydney, Melbourne, Perth, Newcastle, Canberra, Geelong, Townsville and Launceston. The group later played at an Australian Grand Prix event, sharing the stage with Kiss. In March, the band headlined on the Sunday night at the East Coast Blues & Roots Music Festival in Byron Bay. After this show, Angus quit the band, prompting the band to stop performing for 9 months until reuniting for a small European tour in December.

In January 2009, the ensemble opened the Sydney Festival 2009 at The Domain. In early February, they performed at Hisense Arena as part of the Australian Open for A Day on the Baseline. Also in February, the group issued Live on Earth – a live album featuring 22 songs recorded around the world – and a DVD Live at the Bowl of their Sidney Myer Music Bowl performance, with other shows and on-the-road videos. They issued a box set which was limited to 2000 copies. It contained the Live on Earth CD and DVD as well as a tour diary written by Monro, and band memorabilia. On 28 February, the band played two free shows at Bondi Beach and Circular Quay, welcoming donations, in an effort to raise funds to be put towards the Victorian Bushfire Appeal. In March, the band appeared live on ABC Radio National's The Music Show.

In March, the group played at the annual Bassinthegrass festival in Darwin to a crowd of 5000. They returned to the WOMADelaide festival for a second time. After touring Australia, the ensemble completed a tour of the UK with Balkan support act, Paprika Balkanicus. The tour started in July at O2 Academy Oxford. The band then performed a range of shows in Melbourne, Brisbane and the Northern Territory, before heading off to Canada for a short tour.

=== 2010–2012: Cinema ===
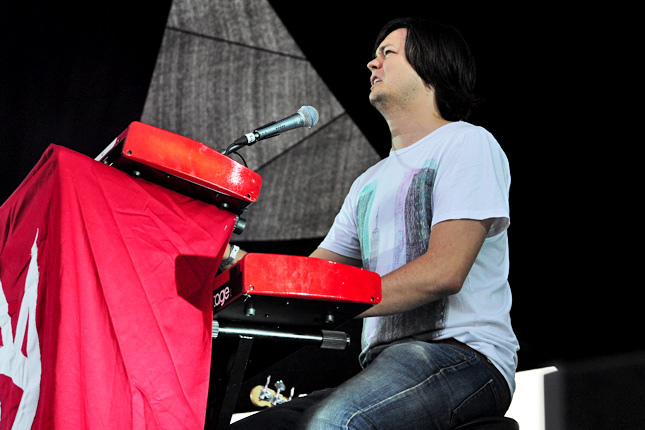
Ollie McGill, West Coast Blues & Roots Festival, April 2011

The Cat Empire's fifth studio album, Cinema, was issued on 25 June 2010 in Australia, followed by releases in Canada, the US, and then Europe. It was produced by Steve Schram and reached number three. The track, "Beyond All", was featured on Triple J's New Music with Richard Kingsmill in April. However, the lead single, "Feeling's Gone", was released in May.

A promotional copy of Cinema had been leaked to eBay about three weeks before its due date and sold for $200; EMI provided a statement regarding the leak. In October 2011, the ensemble played their 800th show at the O2 Academy Bournemouth in front of a sell out crowd. In April 2011, they performed at the West Coast Blues & Roots Festival in Fremantle.

=== 2012–2015: Steal the Light ===
In December 2012, the Cat Empire returned to Melbourne to commence the recording of a new album after touring extensively throughout 2012. The album, produced by Jan Skubiszewski, was scheduled for a May 2013 release, but the band embarked on a March 2013 "warm-up" tour, on which they played intimate shows in Melbourne and Sydney, as well as bigger stages at the Fremantle Arts Centre in Western Australia and WOMADelaide in South Australia.

"Brighter Than Gold", the first single from their sixth album, Steal the Light, was released on 22 February 2013 on the Two Shoes music label. A music video for the song was directed by Nicholas Verso for Asphodel Films. Brighter Than Gold received high rotation on Australian and European radio.

Steal The Light was released on 17 May 2013 and a worldwide "Steal the Light Tour" was announced shortly afterwards. The band performed nine US shows in July 2013, supported by Blackalicious and, for some of the American dates, were joined by fellow Australians Tinpan Orange. They played nine UK dates throughout October, then embarked on a European tour. Support was provided by fellow Australians FLAP!, and the tour eventually consisted of a total of 70 shows on four continents. The most notable of these performances was in Sydney, September 2013, where they performed in the Enmore Theatre. The show attracted more than 1500 people from Sydney, including Riebl's old schoolmate who designed the band's posters, Arthur Brammall.

In February 2014, the Romanian B’ESTFEST Summer Camp announced that the Cat Empire was the first band to confirm their position on the event's musical lineup. The festival was scheduled for 31 July and 1–2 August 2014, on the Mogoşoaia Palace estate, approximately 10 minutes from Bucharest.

On 16 January 2015, the Cat Empire performed at Triple J's 40th anniversary "Beat The Drum" celebration concert at the Domain in Sydney, along with other Australian musicians, including Hilltop Hoods, The Presets, You Am I, Daniel Johns, Vance Joy, The Preatures, Ball Park Music, Sarah Blasko and Gotye. During their set, the Cat Empire collaborated with special guests Remi and Owl Eyes. With the latter, they performed a cover of Kylie Minogue's "Confide in Me".

They were in Romania again the following year, at the Electric Castle festival in Transylvania, on 28 July 2015.

=== 2015–2018: Rising with the Sun ===
In early 2016, the Cat Empire announced their second fully independent album, Rising with the Sun, produced by Jan Skubiszewski. The album was made available worldwide on 4 March. On the week of release, the band performed a series of secret 'pop up busking' events around Melbourne, with locations given to fans via clues shared on social media. The locations performed at were Federation Square, Circus Oz Spiegeltent and South Melbourne market.

The album debuted at #1 on the ARIA and AIR charts in Australia, staying in the AIR top 20 for an impressive 21 weeks to date to date since release. Internationally successful, the album achieved Top 10 debut in 7 countries, and Top 20 debuts in 16 countries: #1 Australia, #1 Romania, #4 Hungary, #7 Sweden, # 8 Canada, #9 Czech Republic, #10 Switzerland, #13 Malaysia, #13 New Zealand, #14 Netherlands, #17 Germany, #18 Denmark, #18 South Africa, #19 United Kingdom, #20 Portugal, #20 Spain.

Supported by lead singles Que Sera Ahora, Wolves (#79 in Triple J Hottest 100) and Bulls, the band has performed live on triple J, Terry Wogan Show on BBC2 and Breakfast TV Toronto, as well as achieving extensive media coverage in all of their major markets globally.

Rising With the Sun was supported by an extensive global tour, with close to 100 shows booked across Australia, Europe, America, and Asia for 2016. Major festivals the band were booked for in 2016 were Sula Festival (India) WOMADelaide (Australia) Bluesfest Byron Bay (Australia) Osheaga (Canada) Edmonton Folk Festival (Canada) Regina Folk Festival (Canada) Rock The Shores (Canada) Pleasure Garden (Australia) and Southbound Festival (Australia), among others.

=== 2018–2020: Stolen Diamonds ===
In early 2018, the Cat Empire recorded their third fully independent album, Stolen Diamonds, at Red Moon Studios (Gisbourne, Victoria), also their third to be produced by Jan Skubiszewski. The album was drip fed to the band's global audience via their release strategy of releasing one new track on the 1st day of each month, where each song was also complemented with the release of a 360 VR video clip. The videos were filmed at The Mission To Seafarers Dome in Melbourne, Victoria, and regularly featured on YouTube's dedicated VR channel The album debuted at #1 AIR charts in Australia, and #4 on the ARIA charts – their 6th release to debut in the top 10 of this chart.

2018 saw the Cat Empire awarded two People's Choice Awards at the Australian National Live Music Awards: Best Live Act of the Year and Best Live Voice of the Year for Angus.

Melbourne magazine Beat rated the album 7 out of 10, stating: "The album barely takes a break from its upbeat tempo, and flows seamlessly between funk, reggae, and ska...". They went on to say that the album "...sees the Cat Empire take one step closer towards legend status."

Double J presented Stolen Diamonds as its feature album, and was also very positive in its review, saying: "The worst thing about Stolen Diamonds is that you're gonna need to clear some space around you if you're planning on listening to it. Because this is very much a record that inspires movement."

The band's St Kilda Festival set was recorded for Double J's Live at the Wireless segment, and they performed a live performance on The Morning Show, as well as achieving extensive media coverage in all of their major markets globally.

With a history of putting fans in the spotlight, lead singers Riebl and Angus hand-delivered copies of the album to fans on release day, and also gave them opportunities to put their own spin on the music with a Karaoke competition for the track Oscar Wilde, and a Busking competition that included an entry from long time friends of the band, Pierce Brothers.

Stolen Diamonds was supported by an extensive global tour, with shows booked across Australia, Europe and America throughout both the single release and album release years 2018/2019. The band were the first band to sell out two consecutive shows at London's prestigious Roundhouse (UK), and hold the record for the band to have sold out the most shows at the O2 Academy Bristol (UK) with 10 shows. Major festivals the band were booked for in 2019 included opening night of The Commonwealth Games (Australia), Woodford Folk Festival (Australia), St Kilda Festival (Australia), Doctor Music (Spain), Larmer Tree Festival (UK), Bristol Sounds (UK), Bands in the Sands (UK), Blue Balls Festival (Switzerland), BosPop (Netherlands), among others.

The band released a live single, "Oscar Wilde" featuring Grace Barbé (Live at the Odeon), on 20 December 2019.

=== 2020–2022: Lockdown and classic line-up disbanding ===
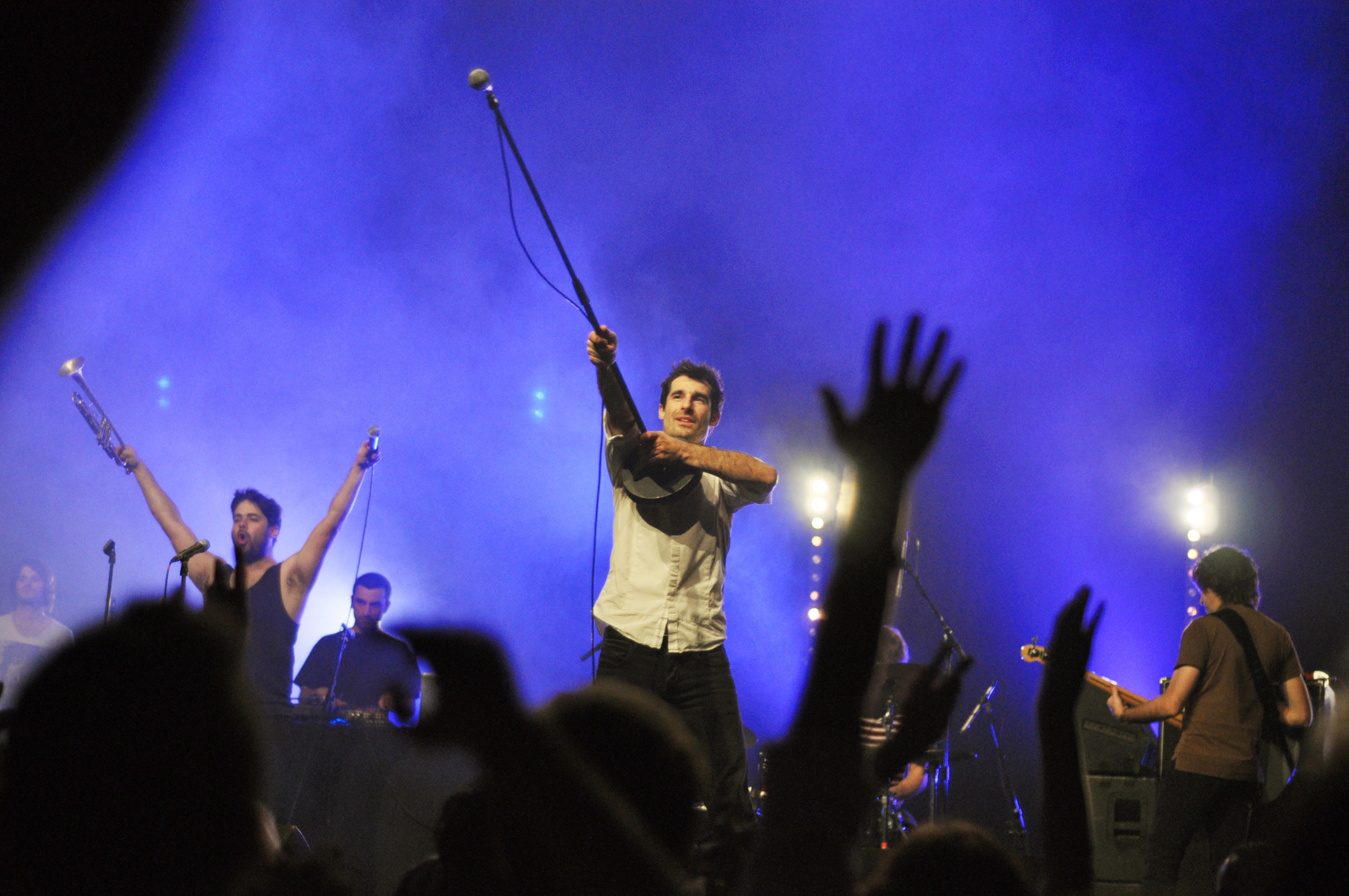
The Cat Empire performing live

In March 2020, the band embarked on a UK and Spain tour, of which the band played 4 shows before it was abruptly cancelled due to the COVID-19 pandemic. After returning to Australia, the band began to work on new material. During this time, they launched a social media initiative, #lockdowngetdown, encouraging listeners to make playlists using their favourite music and share them with others, in an effort to support artists who had lost their source of income due to the impact of the pandemic.

It was announced in March 2021 that founding member and bass player Ryan Monro was retiring from the band. He played his last show at the Sidney Myer Music Bowl on 6 March 2021.

In April 2021, the band announced via their Facebook page that they had entered the recording studio to work on a new album, with Yuri Pavlinov of The Bamboos filling in on bass.

On 9 July 2021, the band released two new singles, Going to Live and Great Beauty. According to Felix, Going to Live was written as a response to being forced to cancel their tour of Spain in 2020 due to COVID-19, and was inspired by people in Spain singing on the rooftops during lockdown. A further two songs, Coming to Meet You and The Scream, were released on 6 August 2021.

On 16 September 2021, the band announced via their Facebook page that core members Hull-Brown, Angus, Khadiwala and the band's career-long manager Correne Wilkie would be leaving the band following a run of shows in Australia. However, Riebl and McGill would continue the band in a new form. On 1 October 2021, the band released the final two songs recorded by the original lineup, Sparrow and Into the Night.

The band started their farewell tour with two shows at the Sidney Meyer Music Bowl in December 2021, for which they were rejoined by former bassist Ryan Monro. They played their final show with the original lineup on 14 April 2022 at Bluesfest Byron Bay.

=== 2022–2024: New line-up and Where the Angels Fall ===
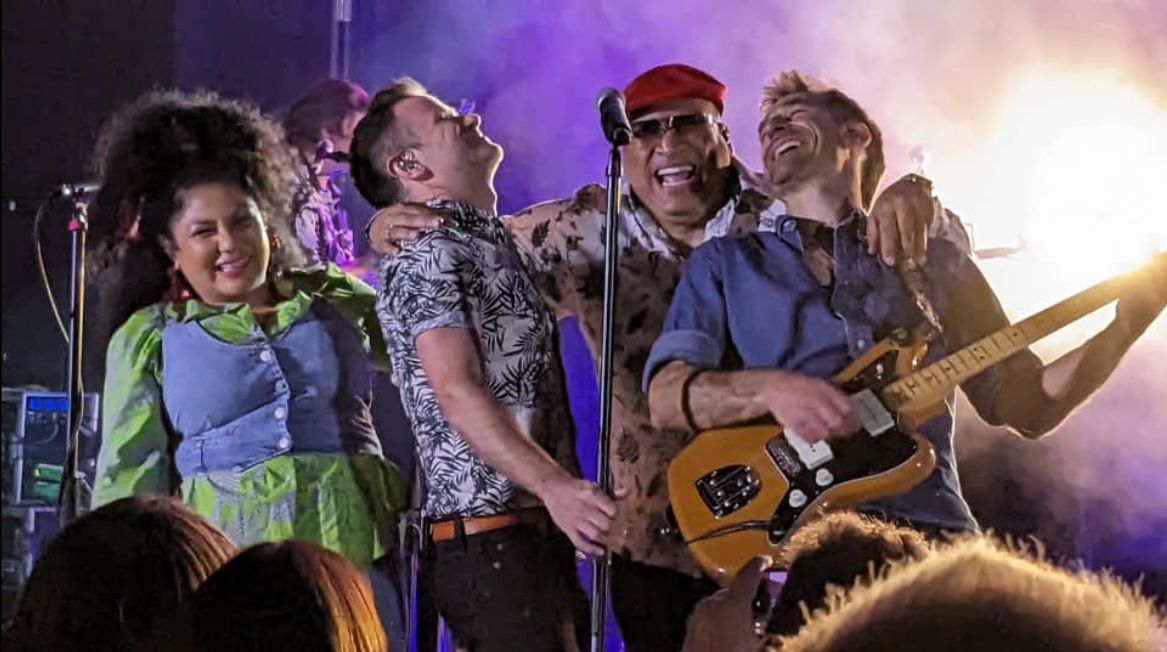
Rahmani, Irwin, Numa and Riebl performing live at the Greenfield Lake Amphitheater, October 2023.

In August 2022, the band began to announce the first shows with a new lineup via their Facebook page, as well as teasing new music, with new band members being announced starting in September. New members announced include Grace Barbé on bass and vocals, Neda Rahmani on percussion, former touring member Daniel Farrugia on drums, and Lazaro Numa joining The Empire Horns on trumpet and percussion.

In May 2023, the Cat Empire announced the release of Where the Angels Fall, scheduled for release on 25 August 2023. The album will include original members Felix Riebl and Ollie McGill, and their new ensemble including Seychelles singer Grace Barbe, Cuban-born trumpeter Lazaro Numa, and Neda Rahmani.

=== 2024-present: Orchestral tour and Bird in Paradise ===
On 25 March 2024, the band announced shows in collaboration with the Melbourne Symphony Orchestra and the Sydney Symphony Orchestra, as well as flamenco group and long-time collaborators Arte Kanela. This was later expanded into a national tour with symphony orchestras from Queensland, Tasmania, Adelaide and Western Australia. On 16 August 2024, it was announced that the Melbourne leg of the tour was indefinitely postponed in solidarity with pianist Jayson Gillham's performances being cancelled due to differing political views. Two intimate shows across Melbourne were scheduled as a replacement. Their concert at the Sydney Opera House on 6 September 2024 was live streamed globally.

During the first half of 2024, the band toured across Europe and North America, including their fourth appearance at Glastonbury Festival, and their first performance in Alaska.

On 30 August 2024, the Cat Empire announced their next album Bird In Paradise, scheduled for release on 7 March 2025.

On 31 January 2025, the Cat Empire released an EP titled Devil.

== Activism ==
In response to the proposed dumping of around 3 million cubic metres of dredged seabed onto the Great Barrier Reef, a legal fighting team was formed by World Wide Fund for Nature (WWF)-Australia and the Australian Marine Conservation Society (AMCS) in late 2013/early 2014. The legal team received further support in April 2014, following the release of the "Sounds for the Reef" musical fundraising project. Produced by Straightup, the digital album features the Cat Empire, in addition to artists such as John Butler, The Herd, Sietta, Missy Higgins, Fat Freddys Drop, The Bamboos (featuring Kylie Auldist) and Resin Dogs. Released on 7 April 2014, the album's 21 songs—including the Cat Empire's song "Steal The Light"—were sold on the Bandcamp website.

The band have been official ambassadors for Melbourne organization Asylum Seeker Resource Centre since 2011, actively participating in events and running fundraising initiatives to support the work of the centre, including their 2016 Telethon, band member run donation drives and raffling off rare memorabilia.

== Band members ==
Current members

- Felix Riebl – lead vocals, percussion, Cuban tres (1999–present)
- Ollie McGill – piano, keyboards, tubular bells, backing vocals, melodica (1999–present)
- Grace Barbé – bass, backing and lead vocals (2022–present)
- Daniel Farrugia – drums (2022–present; touring 2018)
- Neda Rahmani – percussion, backing and lead vocals (2022–present)

The Empire Horns

- Kieran Conrau – trombone, bass trombone, cornet, backing vocals (2002–present)
- Roscoe James Irwin – trumpet, flugelhorn, backing vocals, arrangements, musical direction (2002–present)
- Lazaro Ernesto Numa Pompa – trumpet, percussion, backing and lead vocals (2022–present)

Former members

- Ryan Monro – bass, backing vocals (1999–2021)
- Harry James Angus – trumpet, backing and lead vocals, recorder, guitar (2001–2022)
- Will Hull-Brown – drums (2001–2022)
- Jamshid "DJ Jumps" Khadiwhala – turntables, percussion (2001–2022)

Former touring musicians and substitutes

- Carlo Barbaro – tenor saxophone (2002–2007, Empire Horns)
- Ben Hendry – drums (2013; substitute for Will Hull-Brown)
- Hugh Harvey – drums (2019; substitute for Will Hull-Brown)
- Yuri Pavlinov – bass (2021–2022)
- Dave Symes – bass (2021)
- Darryn Farrugia – drums (2023; substitute for Daniel Farrugia)

Empire Horns substitutes

- Greg Spence – trumpet, backing vocals
- Nick Wilkins – trumpet, backing vocals
- Jordan Murray – trombone, backing vocals
- Phil Noy – tenor saxophone

Empirical Strings

- Kristy Conrau – cello
- Alyssa Conrau – violin

2008 string section

- Jonny Ng – violin
- Adam Cadell – violin
- Neil Thompson – viola
- Dale Rickert – cello
- Fran Haysey – triangle
- Paul Cashmere – tubular bells

The Empire Dancers

- Fai Khadiwhala
- Anthony (Bboy Lamaroc)
- Carlos (Bboy Pepito)
- DJ Rude Bouy
- Benny 'BJ' Riley
- John Hurle
- Lenard Trae (Enigma Boogie)
- Andre Widjaja (Jazzy Dre)
- Arthur Brammall

== Discography ==
Studio albums

- The Cat Empire (2003)
- Two Shoes (2005)
- Cities: The Cat Empire Project (2006)
- So Many Nights (2007)
- Cinema (2010)
- Steal the Light (2013)
- Rising with the Sun (2016)
- Stolen Diamonds (2019)
- Where the Angels Fall (2023)
- Bird in Paradise (2025)
- Bells of Midnight (2027)

== Awards and nominations ==
=== AIR Awards ===
The Australian Independent Record Awards (commonly known informally as AIR Awards) is an annual awards night to recognise, promote and celebrate the success of Australia's Independent Music sector.

Year	Nominee / work	Award	Result	Ref.
2026	Bird in Paradise	Best Independent Jazz Album or EP	Nominated	

=== APRA Awards ===
The APRA Awards are presented annually from 1982 by the Australasian Performing Right Association (APRA), "honouring composers and songwriters". They commenced in 1982.

Year	Nominee / work	Award	Result	Ref.
2014	"Steal the Light" (Harry Angus, Felix Riebl)	Song of the Year	Shortlisted	
2026	"Bird in Paradise" (Grace Barb'e, Ross Irwin, Oliver McGill, Lazaro Numa, Felix Riebl, Richard Tedesco)	Song of the Year	Shortlisted	

=== ARIA Music Awards ===
The ARIA Music Awards is an annual awards ceremony that recognises excellence, innovation, and achievement across all genres of Australian music. They commenced in 1987. The Cat Empire has won one award.

Year	Nominee / work	Award	Result	Ref.
2004	The Cat Empire	Best Group	Nominated	
2004	The Cat Empire	Breakthrough Artist - Album	Nominated	
2004	The Cat Empire	Best Urban Album	Nominated	
2004	"Days Like These"	Breakthrough Artist - Single	Nominated	
2004	Andy Baldwin and The Cat Empire for The Cat Empire The Cat Empire	Producer of the Year	Nominated	
2004	Andy Baldwin for The Cat Empire The Cat Empire	Engineer of the Year	Nominated	
2005	Two Shoes	Best Rock Album	Nominated	
2005	Ben Quinn for The Cat Empire "The Car Song"	Best Video	Nominated	
2006	Adam Rhodes for The Cat Empire Cities: The Cat Empire Project	Engineer of the Year	Nominated	
2006	Cities: The Cat Empire Project	Best World Music Album	Won	
2009	Live at the Bowl	Best Music DVD	Nominated	
2010	Cinema	Best Adult Alternative Album	Nominated	
2025	Bird in Paradise	Best World Music Album	Nominated	
2025	Giulia McGauran for Bird in Paradise	Best Cover Art	Nominated	
2026	Live at Sydney Opera House	Best World Music Album	Nominated	

=== Music Victoria Awards ===
The Music Victoria Awards are an annual awards night celebrating Victorian music. They commenced in 2006.

Year	Nominee / work	Award	Result	Ref.
2024	The Cat Empire	Best Pop Work	Nominated	

=== National Live Music Awards ===
The National Live Music Awards (NLMAs) are a broad recognition of Australia's diverse live industry, celebrating the success of the Australian live scene. The awards commenced in 2016.

Year	Nominee / work	Award	Result	Ref.
2018	The Cat Empire	Best Live Act of the Year - People's Choice	Won	
2018	Harry James Angus (The Cat Empire)	Best Live Voice of the Year - People's Choice	Won	
2019	The Cat Empire	Live Blues and Roots Act of the Year	Nominated	
